= Boston Red Sox =

Major League Baseball franchise

- 2026 Boston Red Sox season

Logo	Cap insignia
- Established in 1901

Major league affiliations
- American League (1901–present); East Division (1969–present)

Current uniform
- Retired numbers: 1; 4; 6; 8; 9; 14; 26; 27; 34; 45; 42

Colors
- Red, navy blue, white (Note: The team's colors are officially red and navy blue, according to the team's mascot (Wally the Green Monster)'s official website.)

Name
- Boston Red Sox (1908–present); Boston Americans (1901–1907)

Nicknames
- The Sox; The BoSox; The Olde Towne Team

Ballpark
- Fenway Park (1912–present); Huntington Avenue Grounds (1901–1911)

Major league titles
- World Series titles (9): 1903; 1912; 1915; 1916; 1918; 2004; 2007; 2013; 2018
- AL pennants (14): 1903; 1904; 1912; 1915; 1916; 1918; 1946; 1967; 1975; 1986; 2004; 2007; 2013; 2018
- AL East division titles (10): 1975; 1986; 1988; 1990; 1995; 2007; 2013; 2016; 2017; 2018
- Wild card berths (10): 1998; 1999; 2003; 2004; 2005; 2008; 2009; 2021; 2025; 2026

Front office
- Principal owner: Fenway Sports Group (John Henry)
- President: Sam Kennedy (President and CEO)
- President of baseball operations: Craig Breslow (Chief Baseball Officer)
- Manager: Chad Tracy
- Website: mlb.com/redsox

The Boston Red Sox are an American professional baseball team based in Boston. The Red Sox compete in Major League Baseball (MLB) as a member club of the American League (AL) East Division. Founded in 1901 as one of the American League's eight charter franchises, the team's home ballpark has been Fenway Park since 1912. The "Red Sox" name was chosen by the team owner, John I. Taylor, c. 1908, following the lead of previous teams that had been known as the "Boston Red Stockings", including the Boston Braves (now the Atlanta Braves). The team has won nine World Series championships, tied for the third-most of any MLB team, and has played in thirteen World Series. Their most recent World Series appearance and win was in 2018. In addition, they won the 1904 American League pennant, but were not able to defend their 1903 World Series championship when the New York Giants refused to participate in the 1904 World Series.

The Red Sox were a dominant team in the new league, defeating the Pittsburgh Pirates in the first World Series in 1903 and winning four more championships by 1918. However, they then went into one of the longest championship droughts in baseball history, dubbed the "Curse of the Bambino" after its alleged inception due to the Red Sox' sale of star player Babe Ruth to the rival New York Yankees two years after their World Series championship in 1918. The Sox endured an 86-year wait before the team's sixth World Series championship in 2004. The team's history during that period was punctuated with some of the most memorable moments in World Series history, including Enos Slaughter's "mad dash" in 1946, the "Impossible Dream" of 1967, Carlton Fisk's home run in 1975, and Bill Buckner's error in 1986. Following their victory in the 2018 World Series, they became the first team to win four World Series trophies in the 21st century, with championships in 2004, 2007, 2013 and 2018. The team's history has also been marked by its intense rivalry with the New York Yankees, arguably the fiercest and most historic in North American professional sports.

The Red Sox are owned by Fenway Sports Group, which also owns Liverpool of the Premier League in England, the National Hockey League's Pittsburgh Penguins and partially owns RFK Racing of the NASCAR Cup Series. They are consistently one of the top MLB teams in average road attendance, while the small capacity of Fenway Park prevents them from leading in overall attendance. From May 15, 2003, to April 10, 2013, the Red Sox sold out every home game—a total of 820 games (794 regular season) for a major professional sports record. Both Neil Diamond's "Sweet Caroline" and the Standells' "Dirty Water" have become anthems for the Red Sox.

As of the end of the 2025 season, the franchise's all-time regular-season record is 10,044–9,336–83 (.518).

== Nickname ==
The name Red Sox, chosen by owner John I. Taylor after the 1907 season, refers to the red hose in the team uniform beginning in 1908. Sox had been previously adopted for the Chicago White Sox by newspapers needing a headline-friendly form of Stockings, as "Stockings Win!" in large type did not fit in a column. The team name "Red Sox" had previously been used as early as 1888 by a "colored" team from Norfolk, Virginia. The Spanish language media sometimes refers to the team as Medias Rojas, a translation of "red socks". The official Spanish site uses the variant "Los Red Sox".

The Red Stockings nickname was previously used by the Cincinnati Red Stockings, who were members of the pioneering National Association of Base Ball Players. Managed by Harry Wright, Cincinnati adopted a uniform with white knickers and red stockings and earned the famous nickname, a year or two before hiring the first fully professional team in 1869. When the club folded after the 1870 season, Wright was hired by Boston businessman Ivers Whitney Adams to organize a new team in Boston, and he brought three teammates and the "Red Stockings" nickname along. (Most nicknames were then unofficial—neither club names nor registered trademarks—so the migration was informal.) The Boston Red Stockings won four championships in the five seasons of the new National Association, the first professional league.

When a new Cincinnati club was formed as a charter member of the National League in 1876, the "Red Stockings" nickname was commonly reserved for them once again, and the Boston team was referred to as the "Red Caps". Other names were sometimes used before Boston officially adopted the nickname "Braves" in 1912; the club eventually left Boston for Milwaukee and is now playing in Atlanta.

The Red Sox logo worn on uniforms in 1908, announcing the team's first official nickname

In 1901, the upstart American League established a competing club in Boston. (Originally, a team was supposed to be started in Buffalo, but league ownership at the last minute removed that city from their plans in favor of the expansion Boston franchise.) For seven seasons, the AL team wore dark blue stockings and had no official nickname. They were simply "Boston", "Bostonians" or "the Bostons"; or the "Americans" or "Boston Americans" as in "American Leaguers", Boston being a two-team city. Their 1901–1907 jerseys, both home, and road, just read "Boston", except for 1902 when they sported large letters "B" and "A" denoting "Boston" and "American". Newspaper writers of the time used other nicknames for the club, including "Somersets" (for owner Charles Somers), "Plymouth Rocks", "Beaneaters", the "Collinsites" (for manager Jimmy Collins), and "Pilgrims".

For years many sources have listed "Pilgrims" as the early Boston AL team's official nickname, but researcher Bill Nowlin has demonstrated that the name was barely used, if at all, during the team's early years. The origin of the nickname appears to be a poem entitled "The Pilgrims At Home" written by Edwin Fitzwilliam that was sung at the 1907 home opener ("Rory O'More" melody). This nickname was commonly used during that season, perhaps because the team had a new manager and several rookie players. John I. Taylor had said in December 1907 that the Pilgrims "sounded too much like homeless wanderers."

The National League club in Boston, though seldom called the "Red Stockings" anymore, still wore red trim. In 1907, the National League club adopted an all-white uniform, and the American League team saw an opportunity. On December 18, 1907, Taylor announced that the club had officially adopted red as its new team color. The 1908 uniforms featured a large icon of a red stocking angling across the shirt front. For 1908, the National League club returned to wearing red trim, but the American League team finally had an official nickname and remained the "Red Sox" for good.

The name is often shortened to "Bosox" or "BoSox", a combination of "Boston" and "Sox" (similar to the "ChiSox" in Chicago or the minor league "WooSox" of Worcester, a minor league affiliate of Boston). Sportswriters sometimes refer to the Red Sox as the Crimson Hose and the Olde Towne Team. Recently, media have begun to call them the "Sawx" casually, reflecting how the word is pronounced with a New England accent. However, most fans simply refer to the team as the "Sox" when the context is understood to mean Red Sox.

The formal name of the entity which owns the team is "Boston Red Sox Baseball Club Limited Partnership". The name shown on a door near the main entrance to Fenway Park, "Boston American League Baseball Company", was used prior to the team's reorganization as a limited partnership on May 26, 1978.

== History ==
=== 1901–1919: The golden era ===
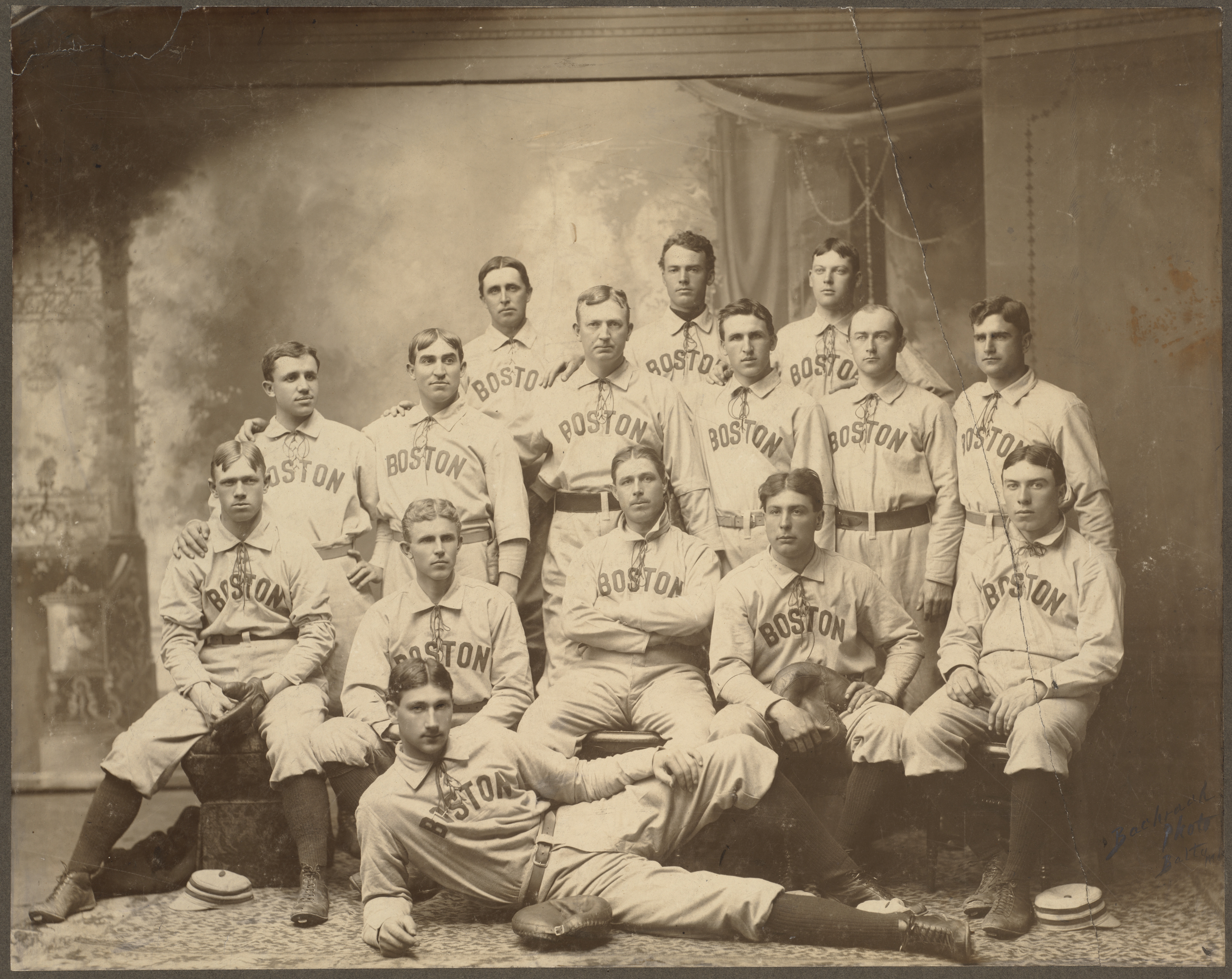
The 1901 Boston Americans team photograph

In 1901, the minor Western League, led by Ban Johnson, declared itself to be equal to the National League, then the only major league in baseball. Johnson had changed the name of the league to the American League prior to the 1900 season. In 1901, the league created a franchise in Boston, called the "Boston Americans", to compete with the National League team there.

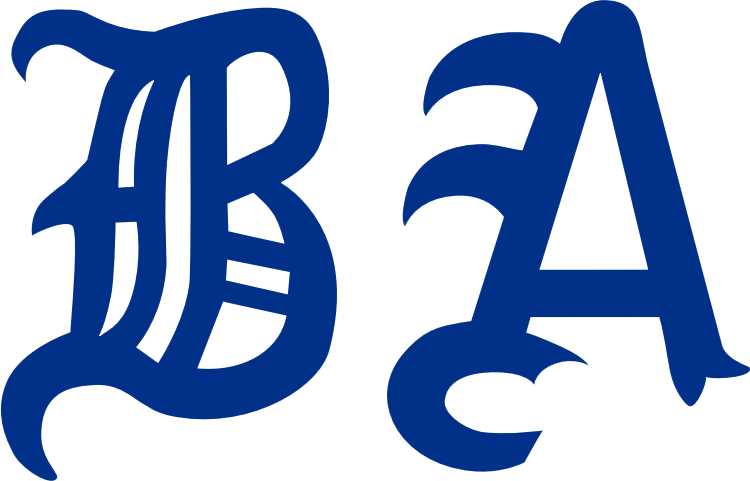
The Americans logo, 1901–1907

Playing their home games at Huntington Avenue Grounds, the Boston franchise finished second in the league in 1901 and third in 1902. The team was originally owned by C.W. Somers. In January 1902, he sold all but one share of the team to Henry Killilea.

The early teams were led by manager and star third baseman Jimmy Collins, outfielders Chick Stahl, Buck Freeman, and Patsy Dougherty, and pitcher Cy Young, who in 1901 won the pitching Triple Crown with 33 wins (41.8% of the team's 79 wins), 1.62 ERA and 158 strikeouts.

In 1903, the team won their first American League pennant and, as a result, Boston participated in the first modern World Series, going up against the Pittsburgh Pirates. Aided by the modified chants of "Tessie" by the Royal Rooters fan club and by its stronger pitching staff, the Americans won the best-of-nine series five games to three.

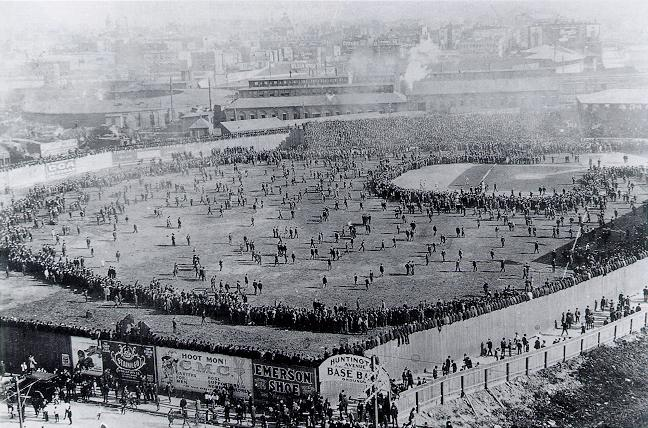
Iconic photo of the Huntington Avenue Grounds before the first modern World Series game

In April 1904, the team was purchased by John I. Taylor of Boston. The 1904 team found itself in a pennant race against the New York Highlanders. A predecessor to what became a storied rivalry, this race featured the trade of Patsy Dougherty to the Highlanders for Bob Unglaub. In order to win the pennant, the Highlanders needed to win both games of their final doubleheader with the Americans at the Highlanders' home stadium, Hilltop Park. With Jack Chesbro on the mound, and the score tied 2–2 with a man on third in the top of the ninth, a spitball got away from Chesbro and Lou Criger scored the go-ahead run and the Americans won their second pennant. However, the NL champion New York Giants declined to play any postseason series, but a sharp public reaction led the two leagues to make the World Series a permanent championship, starting in 1905.

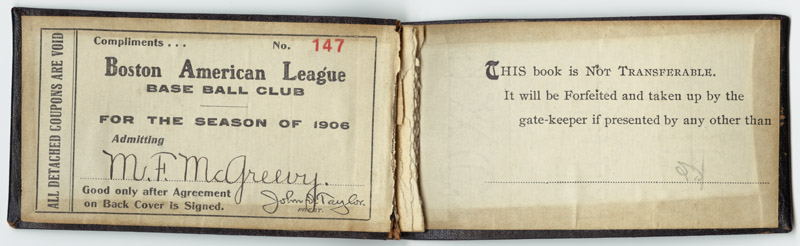
A season pass for the 1906 season

In 1906, Boston lost 105 games and finished last in the league. In December 1907, Taylor proposed that the Boston Americans name change to the Boston Red Sox.

By 1909, center fielder Tris Speaker had become a fixture in the Boston outfield, and the team finished the season in third place. In 1912, the Red Sox won 105 games and the pennant. The 105 wins stood as the club record until the 2018 club won 108. Anchored by an outfield including Tris Speaker, Harry Hooper and Duffy Lewis, and pitcher Smoky Joe Wood, the Red Sox beat the New York Giants 4–3–1 in the 1912 World Series best known for Snodgrass's Muff.

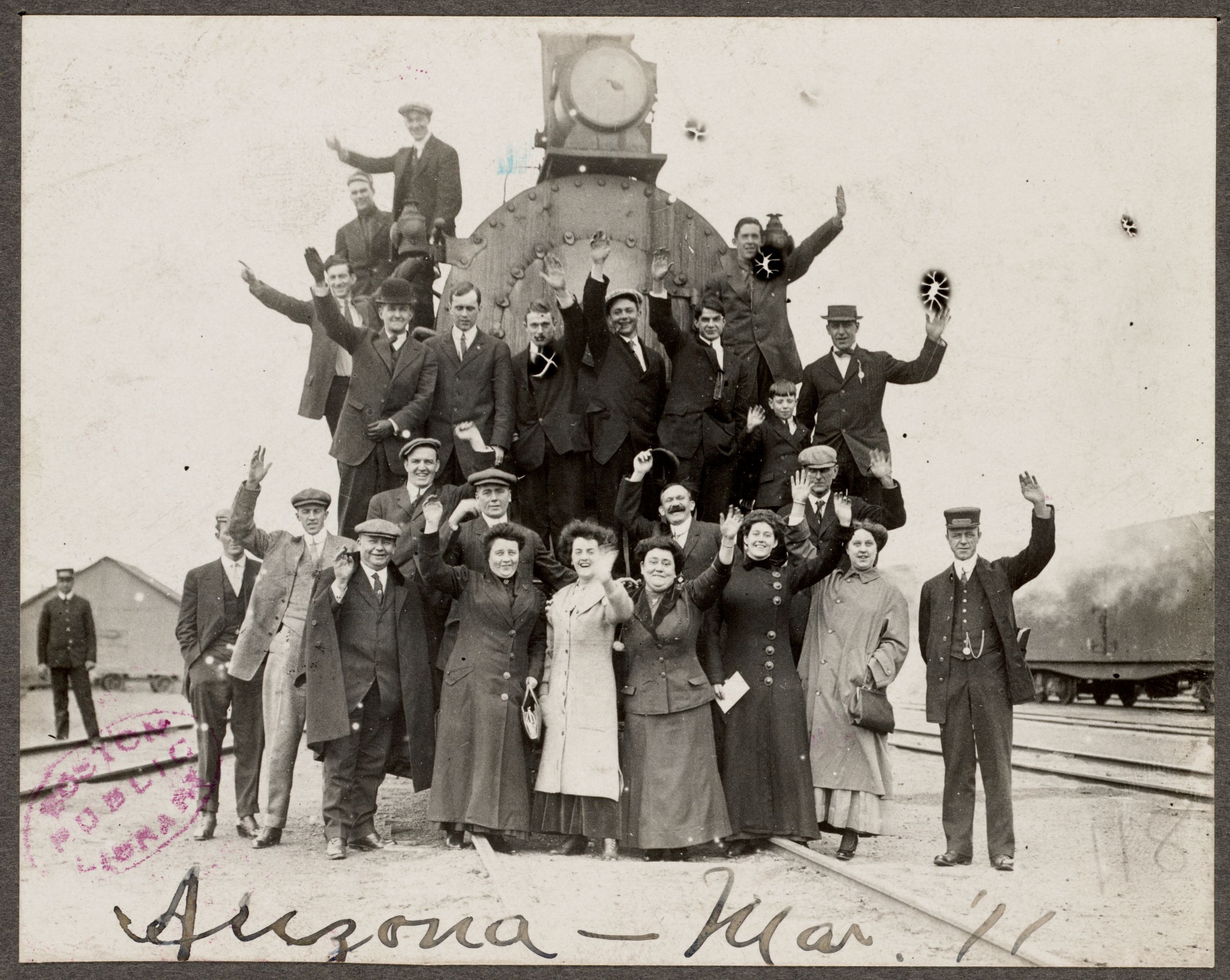
Boston Red Sox at Spring Training, Arizona. Michael T. "Nuf Ced" McGreevy Collection, Boston Public Library

From 1913 to 1916, the Red Sox were owned by Joseph Lannin. In 1914, Lannin signed a young up-and-coming pitcher named Babe Ruth from the Baltimore Orioles of the International League. In 1915, the team won 101 games and went on to the 1915 World Series, where they beat the Philadelphia Phillies four games to one. Following the 1915 season, Tris Speaker was traded to the Cleveland Indians. The Red Sox went on to win the 1916 World Series, defeating the Brooklyn Robins.

Harry Frazee bought the Red Sox from Joseph Lannin in 1916 for about $675,000. In 1918, Babe Ruth led the team to another World Series championship over the Chicago Cubs.

=== 1920–1938: Sale of Babe Ruth and aftermath ===
Prior to the sale of Babe Ruth, multiple trades occurred between the Red Sox and the Yankees. On December 18, 1918, outfielder Duffy Lewis, pitcher Dutch Leonard and pitcher Ernie Shore were traded to the Yankees for pitcher Ray Caldwell, Slim Love, Roxy Walters, Frank Gilhooley and $15,000. In July 1919, pitcher Carl Mays quit the team and then was traded to the Yankees for Bob McGraw, Allan Russell and $40,000.

After Mays was traded, league president Ban Johnson suspended him due to his breaking of his contract with the Red Sox. The Yankees went to court after Johnson suspended Mays. After the Yankees were able to play Mays, the American League split into two factions: the Yankees, Red Sox and White Sox, known as the "Insurrectos", versus Johnson and the remaining five clubs, a.k.a. the "Loyal Five".

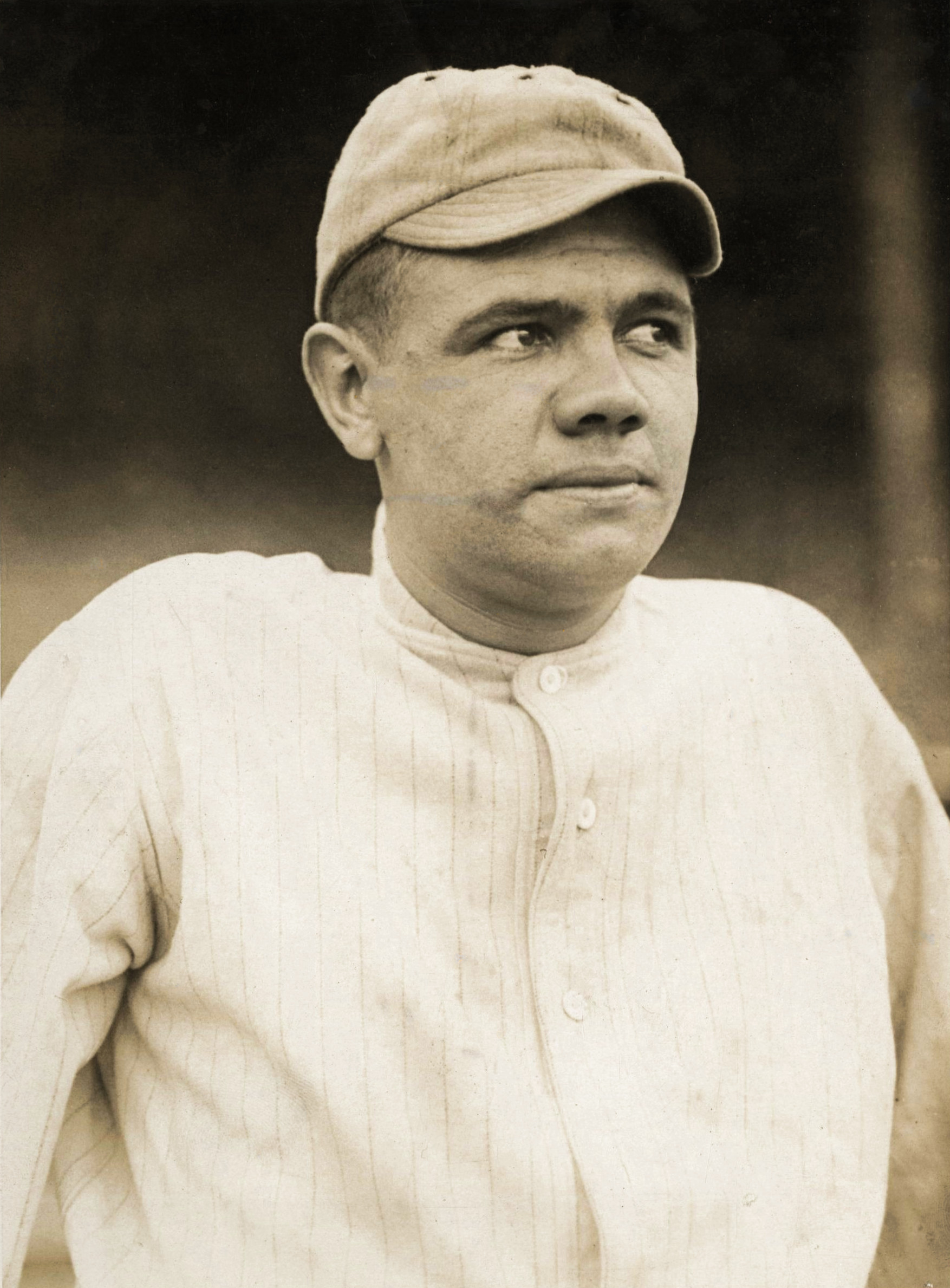
Babe Ruth in 1915

On December 26, 1919, the team sold Babe Ruth, who had played the previous six seasons for the Red Sox, to the rival New York Yankees. The sale was announced on January 6, 1920. In 1919, Ruth had broken the single-season home run record, hitting 29 home runs. It was believed that Frazee sold Ruth to finance the Broadway musical No, No, Nanette. While No, No, Nanette did not open on Broadway until 1925, Leigh Montville's book, The Big Bam: The Life and Times of Babe Ruth, reports that No, No, Nanette had originated as a non-musical stage play called My Lady Friends, which opened on Broadway in December 1919. According to the book, My Lady Friends had been financed by Ruth's sale to the Yankees. The sale of Babe Ruth came to be viewed as the beginning of the Red Sox–Yankees rivalry, considered the "best rivalry" by American sports journalists.

In the December 1920, Wally Schang, Waite Hoyt, Harry Harper and Mike McNally were traded to the Yankees for Del Pratt, Muddy Ruel, Hank Thormahlen, Sammy Vick. The following winter, shortstop Everett Scott, and pitchers Bullet Joe Bush and Sad Sam Jones were traded to the Yankees for Roger Peckinpaugh, who was immediately traded to the Washington Senators, Jack Quinn, Rip Collins, Bill Piercy.

On July 23, 1922, Joe Dugan and Elmer Smith were traded to the Yankees for Elmer Miller, Chick Fewster, Johnny Mitchell, and Lefty O'Doul. Acquiring Dugan helped the Yankees edge the St. Louis Browns in a tight pennant race. After late trades in 1922, a June 15 trading deadline went into effect. In 1923, Herb Pennock was traded by the Red Sox to the Yankees for Camp Skinner, Norm McMillan, and George Murray.

The loss of several top players sent the Red Sox into free fall. During the 1920s and early 1930s, the Red Sox were fixtures in the second division, never finishing closer than 20 games out of first. The losses increased after Frazee sold the team to Bob Quinn in 1923. The team bottomed out in 1932 with a record of 43–111, still the worst record in franchise history. However, in 1931, Earl Webb set the all-time mark for most doubles in a season with 67.

In 1933, Tom Yawkey bought the team. Yawkey acquired pitchers Wes Ferrell and Lefty Grove, Joe Cronin, a shortstop and manager, and first baseman Jimmie Foxx. In 1938, Foxx hit 50 home runs, which stood as a club record for 68 years. That year Foxx also set a club-record of 175 runs.

=== 1939–1960: The Ted Williams era ===
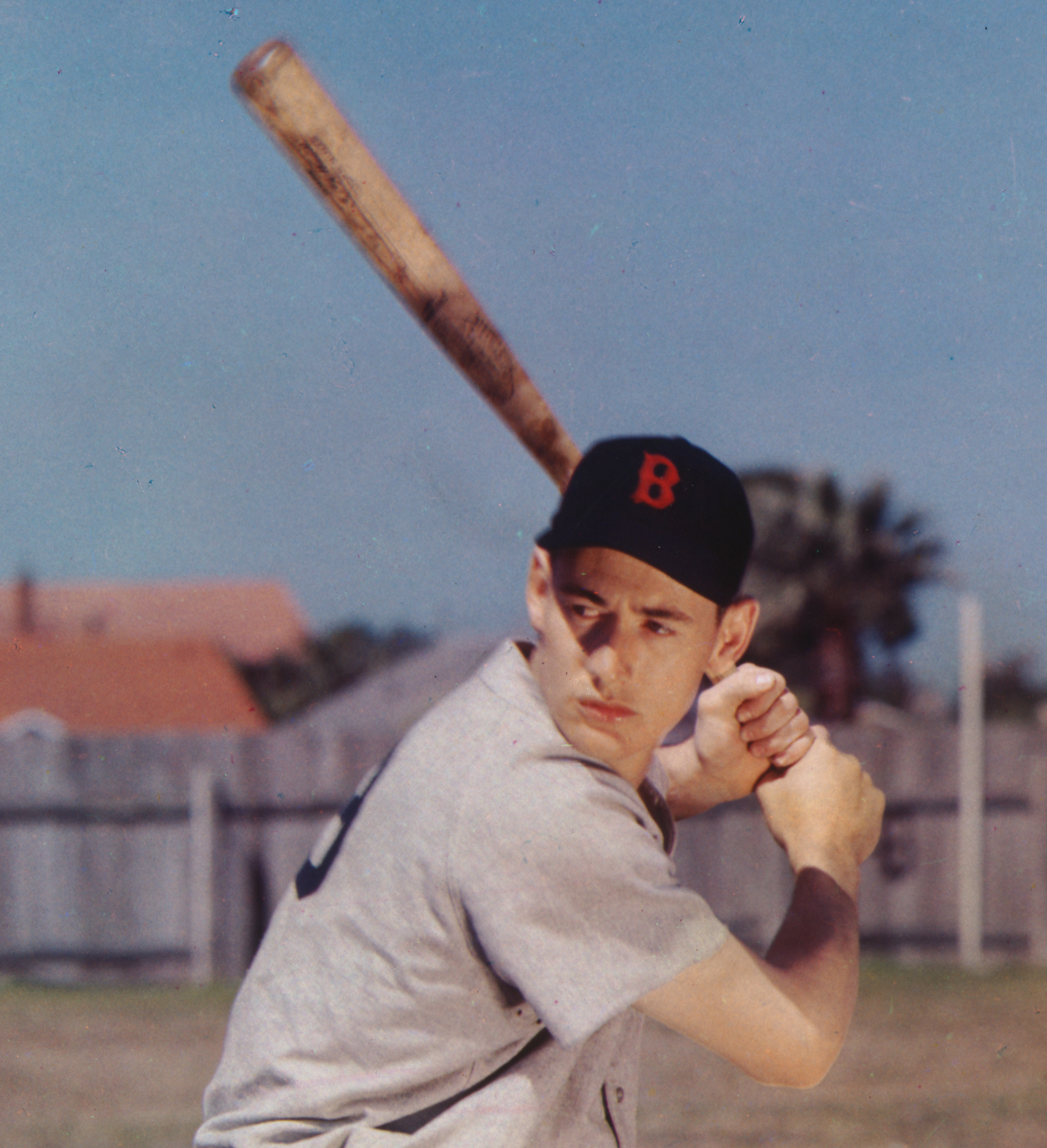
Ted Williams in 1940

In 1939, the Red Sox purchased the contract of outfielder Ted Williams from the minor league San Diego Padres of the Pacific Coast League, ushering in an era of the team sometimes called the "Ted Sox". Williams consistently hit for both high power and high average, and is generally considered one of the greatest hitters of all time. The right-field bullpens in Fenway were built in part for Williams' left-handed swing, and are sometimes called "Williamsburg". Before this addition, it was over 400 feet (120 m) to right field. He served two stints in the United States Marine Corps as a pilot and saw active duty in both World War II and the Korean War, missing at least five full seasons of baseball. His book The Science of Hitting is widely read by students of baseball. He is currently the last player to hit over.400 for a full season, batting.406 in 1941. Williams feuded with sports writers his whole career, calling them "The Knights of the Keyboard", and his relationship with the fans was often rocky as he was seen spitting towards the stands on more than one occasion.

With Williams, the Red Sox reached the 1946 World Series but lost to the St. Louis Cardinals in seven games in part because of the use of the "Williams Shift", a defensive tactic in which the shortstop moves to the right side of the infield to make it harder for the left-handed-hitting Williams to hit to that side of the field. Some have claimed that he was too proud to hit to the other side of the field, not wanting to let the Cardinals take away his game. His performance may have also been affected by a pitch he took in the elbow in an exhibition game a few days earlier. Either way, in his only World Series, Williams gathered just five singles in 25 at-bats for a.200 average.

The Cardinals won the 1946 Series when Enos Slaughter scored the go-ahead run all the way from first base on a base hit to left field. The throw from Leon Culberson was cut off by shortstop Johnny Pesky, who relayed the ball to the plate just a hair too late. Some say Pesky hesitated or "held the ball" before he turned to throw the ball, but this has been disputed.

Along with Williams and Pesky, the Red Sox featured several other star players during the 1940s, including second baseman Bobby Doerr and center fielder Dom DiMaggio (the younger brother of Joe DiMaggio).

The Red Sox narrowly lost the AL pennant in 1948 and 1949. In 1948, Boston finished in a tie with Cleveland, and their loss to Cleveland in a one-game playoff ended hopes of an all-Boston World Series. Curiously, manager Joseph McCarthy chose journeyman Denny Galehouse to start the playoff game when the young lefty phenom Mel Parnell was available to pitch. In 1949, the Red Sox were one game ahead of the New York Yankees, with the only two games left for both teams being against each other, and they lost both of those games.

The 1950s were viewed as a time of tribulation for the Red Sox. After Williams returned from the Korean War in 1953, many of the best players from the late 1940s had retired or been traded. The stark contrast in the team led critics to call the Red Sox' daily lineup "Ted Williams and the Seven Dwarfs". Jackie Robinson was even worked out by the team at Fenway Park, however, owner Tom Yawkey did not want an African American player on his team. Willie Mays also tried out for Boston and was highly praised by team scouts. In 1955, Frank Malzone debuted at third base and Ted Williams hit.388 at the age of 38 in 1957, but there was little else for Boston fans to root for. Williams retired at the end of the 1960 season, famously hitting a home run in his final at-bat as memorialized in the John Updike story "Hub fans bid Kid adieu." The Red Sox finally became the last Major League team to field an African American player when they promoted infielder Pumpsie Green from their AAA farm team in 1959.

=== 1960s: Yaz and the Impossible Dream ===
The 1960s also started poorly for the Red Sox, though 1961 saw the debut of Carl "Yaz" Yastrzemski, Williams' replacement in left field, who developed into one of the better hitters of a pitching-rich decade.

Red Sox fans know 1967 as the season of the "Impossible Dream". The slogan refers to the hit song from the popular musical play "Man of La Mancha". 1967 saw one of the great pennant races in baseball history with four teams in the AL pennant race until almost the last game. The BoSox had finished the 1966 season in ninth place, but they found new life with Yastrzemski as the team won the pennant to reach the 1967 World Series. Yastrzemski won the American League Triple Crown (the most recent player to accomplish such a feat until Miguel Cabrera did so in 2012), hitting.326 with 44 home runs and 121 runs batted in. He was named the league's Most Valuable Player, just one vote shy of a unanimous selection as a Minnesota sportswriter placed Twins center fielder César Tovar first on his ballot. But the Red Sox lost the series to the St. Louis Cardinals in seven games. Cardinals pitcher Bob Gibson stymied the Red Sox, winning three games.

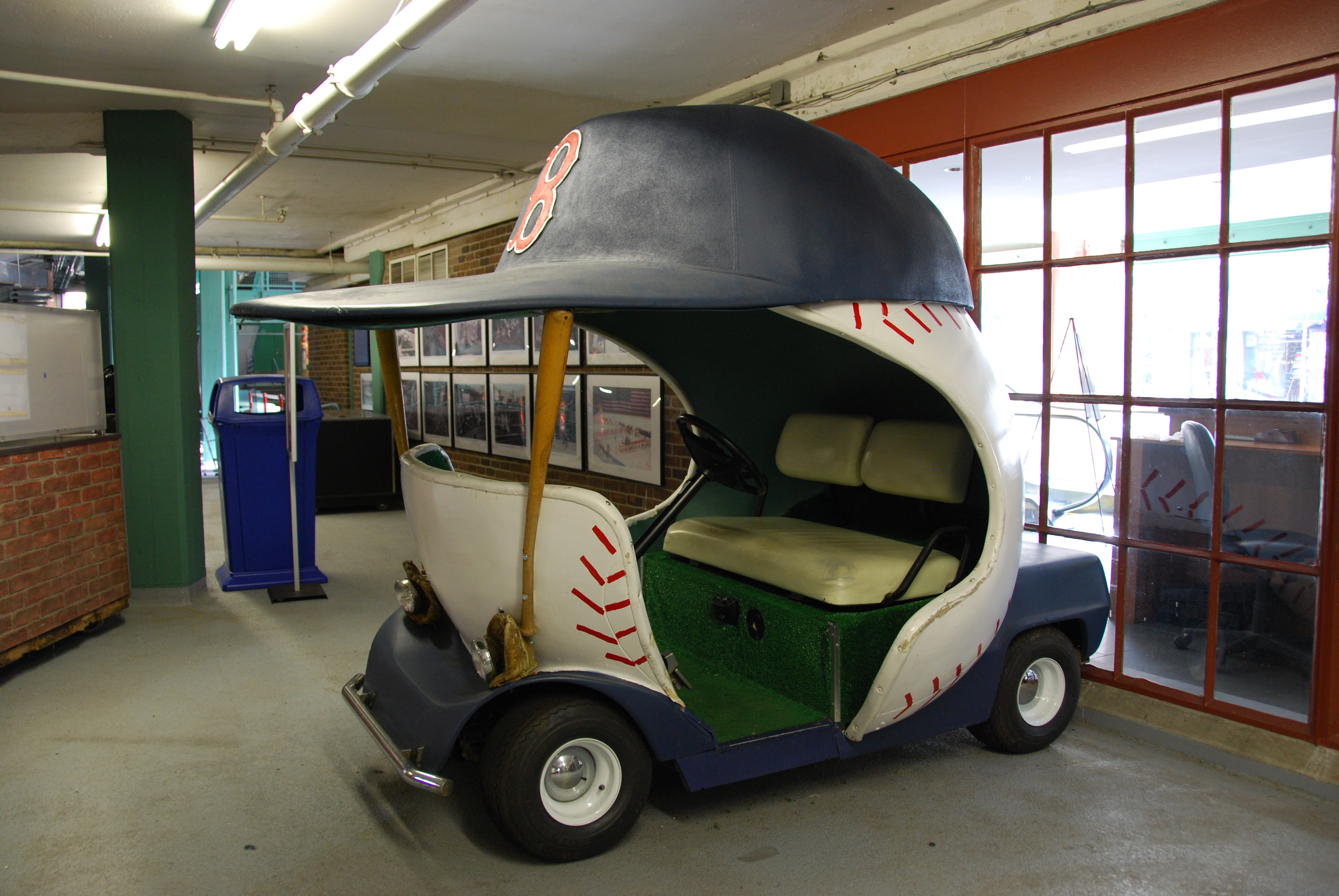
The bullpen car used by the Red Sox

An 18-year-old Bostonian rookie named Tony Conigliaro slugged 24 home runs in 1964. "Tony C" became the youngest player in Major League Baseball to hit his 100th home run, a record that stands today. He was struck just above the left cheek bone by a fastball thrown by Jack Hamilton of the California Angels on Friday, August 18, 1967, and sat out the entire next season with headaches and blurred vision. Although he did have a productive season in 1970, he was never the same.

=== 1970s: The Red Hat era ===
Although the Red Sox were competitive for much of the late 1960s and early 1970s, they never finished higher than second place in their division. The closest they came to a divisional title was 1972 when they lost by a half-game to the Detroit Tigers. The start of the season was delayed by a players' strike, and the Red Sox had lost one more game to the strike than the Tigers had. Games lost to the strike were not made up. The Red Sox went to Detroit with a half-game lead for the final series of the season, but lost the first two of those three and were eliminated from the pennant race.

==== 1975 ====
The Red Sox won the AL pennant in 1975. The 1975 Red Sox were as colorful as they were talented, with Yastrzemski and rookie outfielders Jim Rice and Fred Lynn, veteran outfielder Dwight Evans, catcher Carlton Fisk, and pitchers Luis Tiant and eccentric junkballer Bill "The Spaceman" Lee. Fred Lynn won both the American League Rookie of the Year award and the Most Valuable Player award, a feat which had never previously been accomplished, and was not duplicated until Ichiro Suzuki did it in 2001. In the 1975 American League Championship Series, the Red Sox swept the Oakland A's.

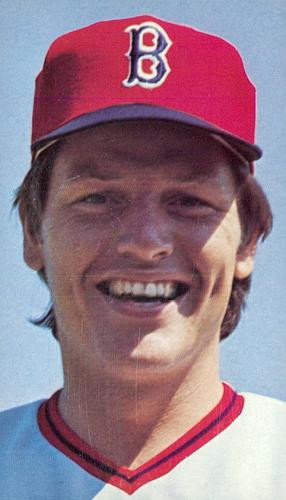
Carlton Fisk, best known for his "waving fair" home run in Game 6 of the 1975 World Series

In the 1975 World Series, they faced the heavily favored Cincinnati Reds, also known as The Big Red Machine. Luis Tiant won games 1 and 4 of the World Series but after five games, the Red Sox trailed the series 3 games to 2. Game 6 at Fenway Park is considered among the greatest games in postseason history. Down 6–3 in the bottom of the eighth inning, Red Sox pinch hitter Bernie Carbo hit a three-run homer into the center field bleachers off Reds fireman Rawly Eastwick to tie the game. In the top of the 11th inning, right fielder Dwight Evans made a spectacular catch of a Joe Morgan line drive and doubled off Ken Griffey at first base to preserve the tie. In the bottom of the 12th inning, Carlton Fisk hit a deep fly ball that sliced towards the left-field foul pole above the Green Monster. As the ball sailed into the night, Fisk waved his arms frantically towards fair territory, seemingly pleading with the ball not to go foul. The ball complied, and bedlam ensued at Fenway as Fisk rounded the bases to win the game for the Red Sox 7–6.

The Red Sox lost game 7, 4–3 even though they had an early 3–0 lead. Starting pitcher Bill Lee threw a slow looping curve which he called a "Leephus pitch" or "space ball" to Reds first baseman Tony Pérez who hit the ball over the Green Monster and across the street. The Reds scored the winning run in the 9th inning. Carlton Fisk said famously about the 1975 World Series, "We won that thing 3 games to 4."

==== 1978 pennant race ====
In 1978, the Red Sox and the Yankees were involved in a tight pennant race. The Yankees were 14 1/2 games behind the Red Sox in July, and on September 10, after completing a 4-game sweep of the Red Sox (known as "The Boston Massacre"), the Yankees tied for the divisional lead.

On September 16 the Yankees held a 3 1/2 game lead over the Red Sox, but the Sox won 11 of their next 13 games and by the final day of the season, the Yankees' magic number to win the division was one—with a win over Cleveland or a Boston loss to the Toronto Blue Jays clinching the division. However, New York lost 9–2 and Boston won 5–0, forcing a one-game playoff to be held at Fenway Park on Monday, October 2.

The most remembered moment from the game was Bucky Dent's 7th inning three-run home run in off Mike Torrez just over the Green Monster, giving the Yankees their first lead. The dejected Boston manager, Don Zimmer, gave Mr. Dent a new middle name which lives on in Boston sports lore to this day, uttering three words as the ball sailed over the left-field wall: "Bucky Fucking Dent!" Reggie Jackson provided a solo home run in the 8th that proved to be the difference in the Yankees' 5–4 win, which ended with Yastrzemski popping out to Graig Nettles in foul territory with Rick Burleson representing the tying run at third. Although Dent became a Red Sox demon, the Red Sox got retribution in 1990 when the Yankees fired Dent as their manager during a series at Fenway Park.

=== 1986 World Series and Game Six ===
Carl Yastrzemski retired after the 1983 season, during which the Red Sox finished sixth in the seven-team AL East, posting their worst record since 1966.

However, in 1986, it appeared that the team's fortunes were about to change. The offense had remained strong with Jim Rice, Dwight Evans, Don Baylor and Wade Boggs. Roger Clemens led the pitching staff, going 24–4 with a 2.48 ERA, and had a 20-strikeout game to win both the American League Cy Young and Most Valuable Player awards. Clemens became the first starting pitcher to win both awards since Vida Blue in 1971. Despite spending a month and a half on the disabled list in the middle of the season, left-hander Bruce Hurst went 13–8, striking out 167 and pitching four shutout games. Boston sportswriters that season compared Clemens and Hurst to Don Drysdale and Sandy Koufax from the 1960s Los Angeles Dodgers.

The Red Sox won the AL East for the first time in 11 seasons, and faced the California Angels in the ALCS. The teams split the first two games in Boston, but the Angels won the next two home games, taking a 3–1 lead in the series. With the Angels poised to win the series, the Red Sox trailed 5–2 heading into the ninth inning of Game 5. A two-run homer by Baylor cut the lead to one. With two outs and a runner on, and one strike away from elimination, Dave Henderson homered off Donnie Moore to put Boston up 6–5. Although the Angels tied the game in the bottom of the ninth, the Red Sox won in the eleventh on a Henderson sacrifice fly off Moore. The Red Sox then found themselves with six- and seven-run wins at Fenway Park in Games 6 and 7 to win the American League title.

The Red Sox faced a heavily favored New York Mets team that had won 108 games in the regular season in the 1986 World Series. Boston won the first two games in Shea Stadium but lost the next two at Fenway, knotting the series at two games apiece. After Bruce Hurst recorded his second victory of the series in Game 5, the Red Sox returned to Shea Stadium looking to garner their first championship in 68 years. However, Game 6 became one of the most devastating losses in club history. After pitching seven strong innings, Clemens was lifted from the game with a 3–2 lead. Years later, Manager John McNamara said Clemens was suffering from a blister and asked to be taken out of the game, a claim Clemens denied. The Mets then scored a run off reliever and former Met Calvin Schiraldi to tie the score 3–3. The game went to extra innings, where the Red Sox took a 5–3 lead in the top of the 10th on a solo home run by Henderson, a double by Boggs and an RBI single by second baseman Marty Barrett.

After recording two outs in the bottom of the 10th, a graphic appeared on the NBC telecast hailing Barrett as the Player of the Game and Bruce Hurst as Most Valuable Player of the World Series. A message even appeared briefly on the Shea Stadium scoreboard congratulating the Red Sox as World Series champions. After so many years of abject frustration, Red Sox fans around the world could taste victory. With the count at two balls and one strike, Mets catcher Gary Carter hit a single. It was followed by singles by Kevin Mitchell and Ray Knight. With Mookie Wilson batting, a wild pitch by Bob Stanley tied the game at 5. Wilson then hit a slow ground ball to first; the ball rolled through Bill Buckner's legs, allowing Knight to score the winning run from second.

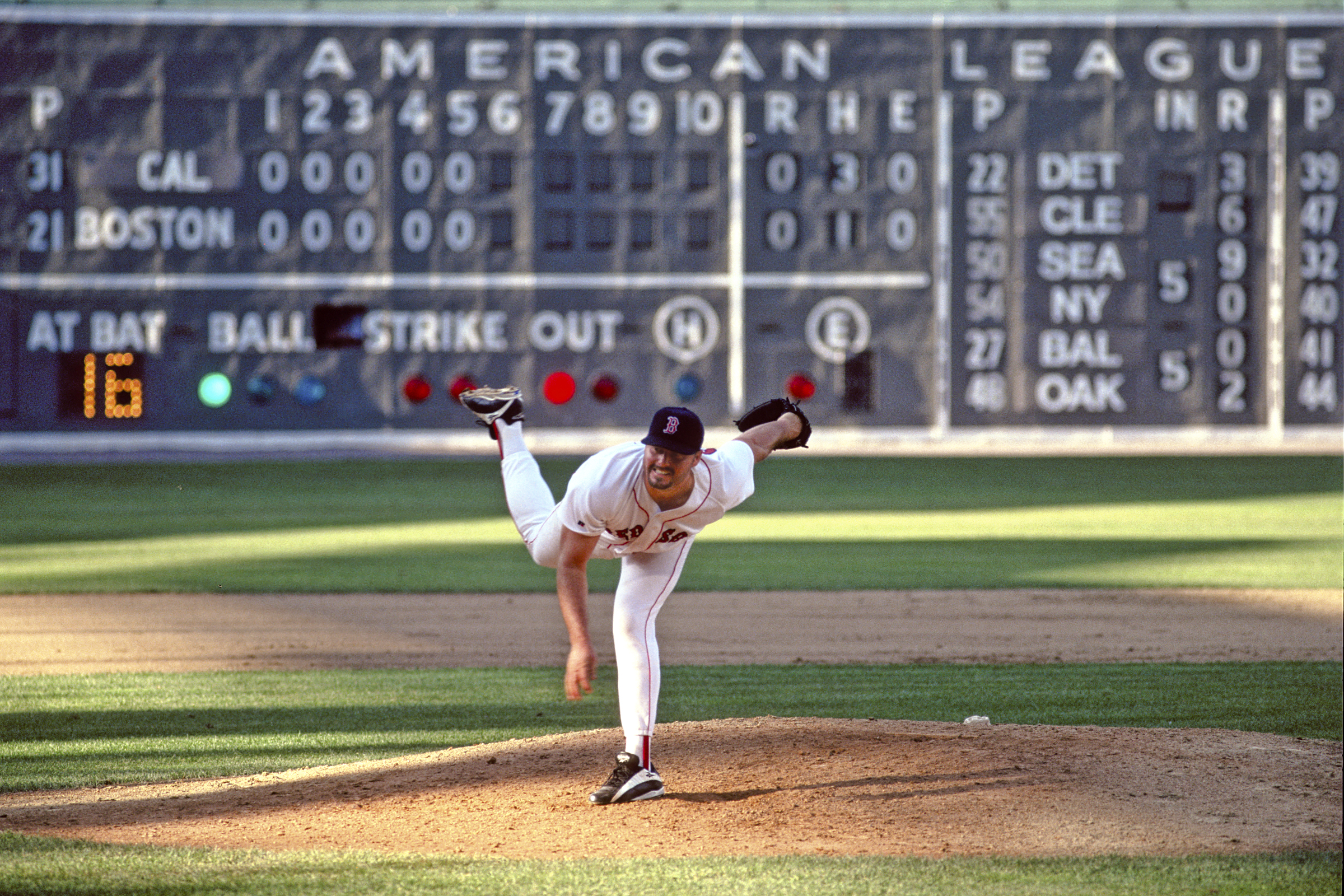
Roger Clemens is the club's all-time strikeout (2,590), wins (192), and shutouts (38) leader.

While Buckner was singled out as responsible for the loss, many observers—as well as both Wilson and Buckner—have noted that even if Buckner had fielded the ball cleanly, the speedy Wilson probably would have still been safe, leaving the game-winning run at third with two out.

Many observers questioned why Buckner was in the game at that point considering he had bad knees and that Dave Stapleton had come in as a late-inning defensive replacement in prior series games. It appeared as though McNamara was trying to reward Buckner for his long and illustrious career by leaving him in the game. After falling behind 3–0, the Mets then won Game 7, concluding the devastating collapse and feeding the myth that the Red Sox were "cursed".

This World Series loss had a strange twist: Red Sox General Manager Lou Gorman was vice-president, player personnel, of the Mets from 1980 to 1983. Working under Mets' GM Frank Cashen, with whom Gorman served with the Orioles, he helped lay the foundation for the Mets' championship.

=== 1988–1991: Morgan Magic ===
The Red Sox returned to the postseason in 1988. With the club in fourth place midway through the 1988 season at the All-Star break, manager John McNamara was fired and replaced by Walpole resident and longtime minor-league manager Joe Morgan on July 15. The club immediately won 12 games in a row, and 19 of 20 overall, to surge to the AL East title in what was called Morgan Magic. But the magic was short-lived, as the team was swept by the Oakland Athletics in the ALCS. The Most Valuable Player of that Series was former Red Sox pitcher and Baseball Hall of Fame player Dennis Eckersley, who saved all four wins for Oakland. Two years later, in 1990, the Red Sox again won the division and face the Athletics in the ALCS. However, the outcome was the same, with the A's sweeping the ALCS in four straight.

In 1990, Yankees fans started to chant "1918!" to taunt the Red Sox. The demeaning chant echoed at Yankee Stadium each time the Red Sox were there. Also, Fenway Park became the scene of Bucky Dent's worst moment as a manager, although it was where he had his greatest triumph. In June, when the Red Sox swept the Yankees during a four-game series at Fenway Park, the Yankees fired Dent as their manager. Red Sox fans felt retribution to Dent being fired on their field, but the Yankees used him as a scapegoat. However, Dan Shaughnessy of The Boston Globe severely criticized Yankees owner George Steinbrenner for firing Dent—his 18th managerial change in as many years since becoming owner—in Boston and said he should "have waited until the Yankees got to Baltimore" to fire Dent. He said that "if Dent had been fired in Seattle or Milwaukee, this would have been just another event in an endless line of George's jettisons. But it happened in Boston and the nightly news had its hook." "The firing was only special because ... it's the first time a Yankee manager—who was also a Red Sox demon—was purged on the ancient Indian burial grounds of the Back Bay." However, Bill Pennington called the firing of Dent "merciless".

=== 1992–2001: Mixed results ===
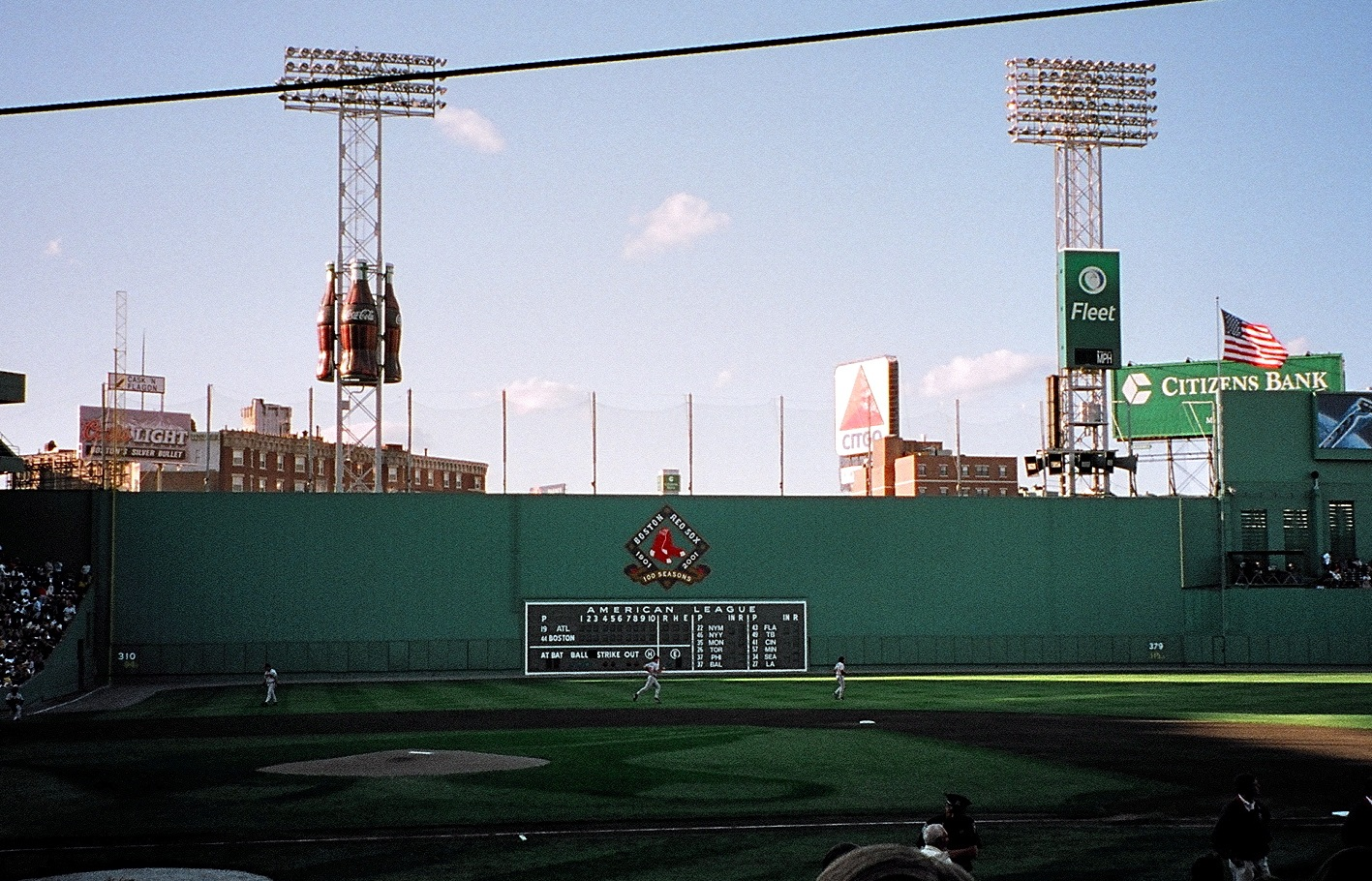
The Red Sox hosting a home game against the Atlanta Braves in July 2001

Tom Yawkey died in 1976, and his wife Jean R. Yawkey took control of the team until her death in 1992. Their initials are shown in two stripes on the left field wall in Morse code. Upon Jean's death, control of the team passed to the Yawkey Trust, led by John Harrington. The trust sold the team in 2002, concluding 70 years of Yawkey ownership.

In 1994, General Manager Lou Gorman was replaced by Dan Duquette, a Massachusetts native who had worked for the Montreal Expos. Duquette revived the team's farm system, which during his tenure produced players such as Nomar Garciaparra, Carl Pavano and David Eckstein. Duquette also spent money on free agents, notably an 8-year, $160 million deal for Manny Ramírez after the 2000 season.

The Red Sox won the newly realigned American League East in 1995, finishing seven games ahead of the Yankees. However, they were swept in three games in the ALDS by the Cleveland Indians. Their postseason losing streak reached 13 straight games, dating back to the 1986 World Series.

Roger Clemens tied his major league record by fanning 20 Detroit Tigers on September 18, 1996, in one of his final appearances in a Red Sox uniform. After Clemens had turned 30 and then had four seasons, 1993–96, which were by his standards mediocre at best, Duquette said the pitcher was entering "the twilight of his career". Clemens went on to pitch well for another ten years and win four more Cy Young Awards.

Out of contention in 1997, the team traded closer Heathcliff Slocumb to Seattle for catching prospect Jason Varitek and right-handed pitcher Derek Lowe. Prior to the start of the 1998 season, the Red Sox dealt pitchers Tony Armas Jr. and Carl Pavano to the Montreal Expos for pitcher Pedro Martínez. Martínez became the anchor of the team's pitching staff and turned in several outstanding seasons. In 1998, the team won the American League Wild Card but again lost the American League Division Series to the Indians.

In 1999, Duquette called Fenway Park "economically obsolete" and, along with Red Sox ownership, led a push for a new stadium.

On the field, the 1999 Red Sox were finally able to overturn their fortunes against the Indians in the American League Division Series. Cleveland took a 2–0 series lead, but Boston won the next three games behind strong pitching by Derek Lowe, Pedro Martínez and his brother Ramón Martínez. Game 4's 23–7 win by the Red Sox was the highest-scoring playoff game in major league history. Game 5 began with the Indians taking a 5–2 lead after two innings, but Pedro Martínez, nursing a shoulder injury, came on in the fourth inning and pitched six innings without allowing a hit while the team's offense rallied for a 12–8 win behind two home runs and seven runs batted in from outfielder Troy O'Leary. After the ALDS victory, the Red Sox lost the American League Championship Series to the Yankees, four games to one. The one bright spot was a lopsided win for the Red Sox in the much-hyped Martinez-Clemens game.

=== 2002–present: John Henry era ===
==== 2002–2003 ====
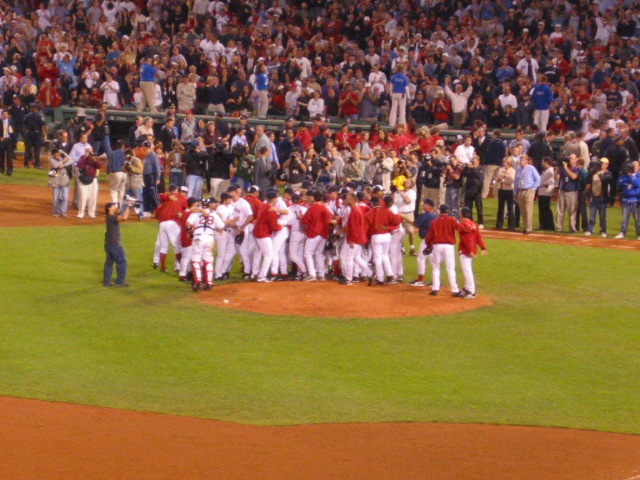
The Red Sox celebrate their clinching of the 2003 AL Wild Card with a victory over the Baltimore Orioles

In 2002, the Red Sox were sold by Yawkey trustee and president Harrington to New England Sports Ventures, a consortium headed by principal owner John Henry. Tom Werner served as executive chairman, Larry Lucchino served as president and CEO, and serving as vice-chairman was Les Otten. Dan Duquette was fired as GM of the club on February 28, with former Angels GM Mike Port taking the helm for the 2002 season. A week later, manager Joe Kerrigan was fired and was replaced by Grady Little.

While nearly all offseason moves were made under Duquette, such as signing outfielder Johnny Damon away from the Oakland Athletics, the new ownership made additions such as outfielder Cliff Floyd and relief pitcher Alan Embree. Nomar Garciaparra, Manny Ramírez, and Floyd all hit well, while Pedro Martínez put up his usual outstanding numbers. Derek Lowe, newly converted into a starter, won 20 games—becoming the first player to save 20 games and win 20 games in back-to-back seasons.

After failing to reach the playoffs, Port was replaced by Yale University graduate Theo Epstein. Epstein, raised in Brookline, Massachusetts, and just 28 at the time of his hiring, became the youngest general manager in MLB history.

The 2003 team was known as the "Cowboy Up" team, a nickname derived from first baseman Kevin Millar's challenge to his teammates to show more determination. In the 2003 American League Division Series, the Red Sox rallied from a 0–2 series deficit against the Athletics to win the best-of-five series. Derek Lowe returned to his former relief pitching role to save Game 5, a 4–3 victory. The team then faced the Yankees in the 2003 American League Championship Series. In Game 7, Boston led 5–2 in the eighth inning, but Pedro Martínez allowed three runs to tie the game. The Red Sox could not score off Mariano Rivera over the last three innings and eventually lost the game 6–5 when Yankee third baseman Aaron Boone hit a solo home run off Tim Wakefield. Some placed the blame for the loss on manager Grady Little for failing to remove starting pitcher Martínez in the 8th inning after some observers believe he began to show signs of tiring. It was stated by Epstein that the decision to not renew Little's contract was "made on a body of work after careful contemplation of the big picture...did not depend on any one decision in any one postseason game." Boston would hire former Philadelphia Phillies manager Terry Francona to manage the 2004 season.

==== "The Idiots": 2004 World Series Championship ====
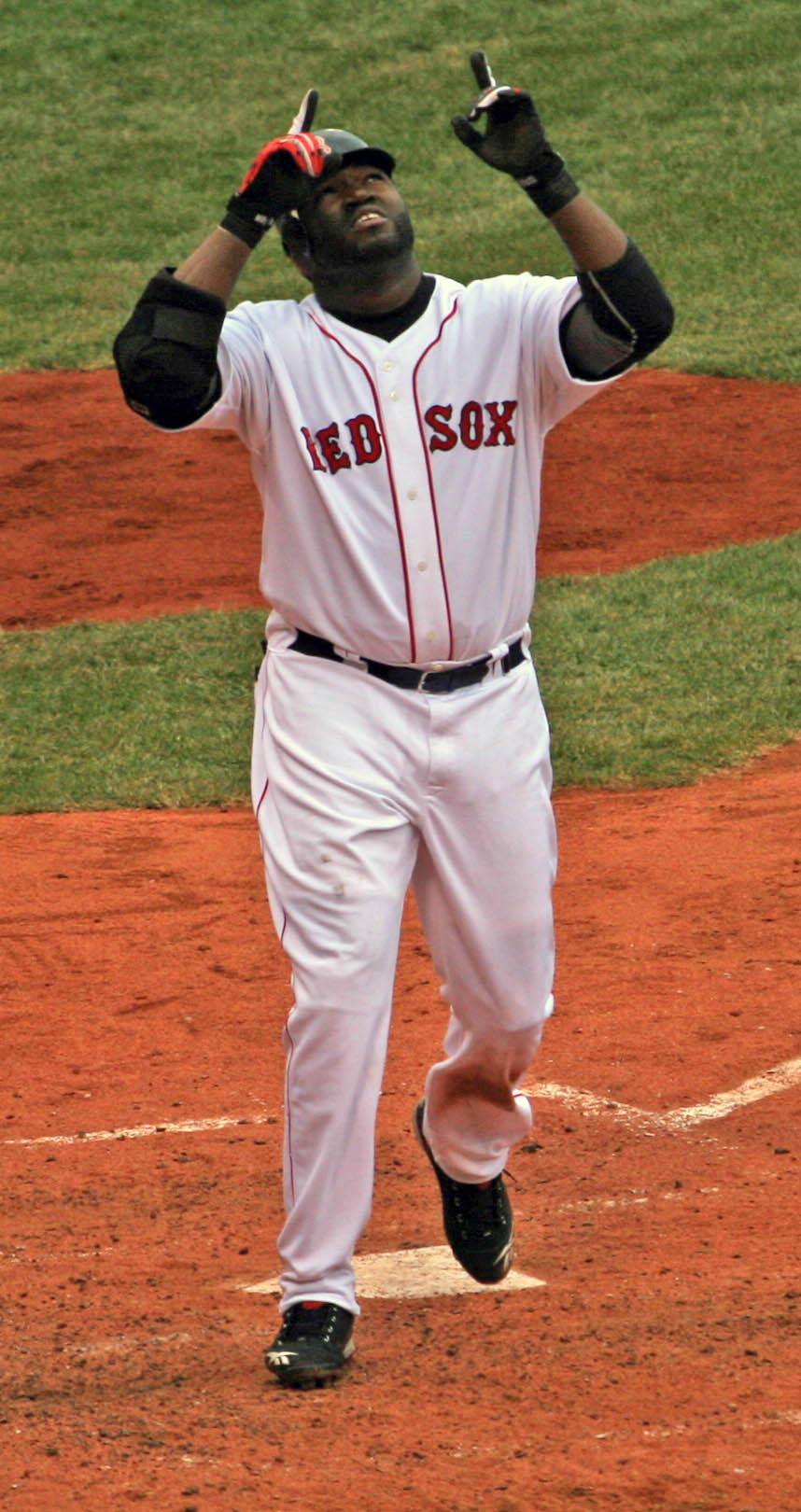
David Ortiz was named 2004 ALCS MVP and 2013 World Series MVP. His #34 was retired by the club in 2017.

During the 2003–04 offseason, the Red Sox acquired another ace pitcher, Curt Schilling, and a closer, Keith Foulke. Due to some midseason struggles with injuries, management shook up the team at the July 31 trading deadline as part of a four-team trade. The Red Sox traded the team's popular, yet oft-injured, shortstop Nomar Garciaparra and outfielder Matt Murton to the Chicago Cubs, and received first baseman Doug Mientkiewicz from the Minnesota Twins, and shortstop Orlando Cabrera from the Montreal Expos. In a separate transaction, the Red Sox acquired center fielder Dave Roberts from the Los Angeles Dodgers. Following the trades, the club won 22 out of 25 games and qualified for the playoffs as the AL Wild Card. Players and fans affectionately referred to the players as "the Idiots", a term coined by Damon and Millar during the playoff push to describe the team's eclectic roster and devil-may-care attitude toward their supposed "curse".

Boston began the postseason by sweeping the AL West champion Anaheim Angels in the ALDS. In the third game of the series, David Ortiz hit a walk-off two-run homer in the 10th inning to win the game and the series to advance to a rematch of the previous year's ALCS in the ALCS against the Yankees. The ALCS started very poorly for the Red Sox, as they lost the first three games (including a crushing 19–8 home loss in game 3). In Game 4, the Red Sox found themselves facing elimination, trailing 4–3 in the ninth with Mariano Rivera in to close for the Yankees. After Rivera issued a walk to Millar, Roberts came on to pinch run and promptly stole second base. He then scored on an RBI single by Bill Mueller, sending the game into extra innings. The Red Sox went on to win the game 6–4 on a two-run home run by Ortiz in the 12th inning. The odds were still very much against the Sox in the series, but Ortiz also made the walk-off hit in the 14th inning of Game 5. The comeback continued with a victory from an injured Schilling in Game 6. Three sutures being used to stabilize the tendon in Schilling's right ankle bled throughout the game, famously making his sock appear bloody red. With it, Boston became the first team in MLB history to force a series-deciding Game 7 after trailing 3–0 in games. The Red Sox completed their historic comeback in Game 7 with a 10–3 victory over the Yankees. Ortiz began the scoring with a two-run homer. Along with his game-winning runs batted in during games 4 and 5, he was named ALCS Most Valuable Player. The Red Sox joined the 1942 Toronto Maple Leafs and the 1975 New York Islanders as the only North American professional sports teams in history at the time to win a best-of-seven games series after being down 3–0. (The 2010 Philadelphia Flyers and the 2014 Los Angeles Kings would later accomplish the feat).

The Red Sox swept the St. Louis Cardinals in the 2004 World Series. The Red Sox never trailed throughout the series; Mark Bellhorn hit a game-winning home run off Pesky's Pole in game 1, and Schilling pitched another bloodied-sock victory in game 2, followed by similarly masterful pitching performances by Martinez and Derek Lowe. It was the Red Sox' first championship in 86 years. Manny Ramírez was named World Series MVP. To add a final, surreal touch to Boston's championship season, on the night of Game 4 a total lunar eclipse colored the moon red over Busch Stadium. The Red Sox earned many accolades from the sports media and throughout the nation for their season, such as in December, when Sports Illustrated named the Boston Red Sox the 2004 Sportsmen of the Year.

==== 2007: World Series Championship ====
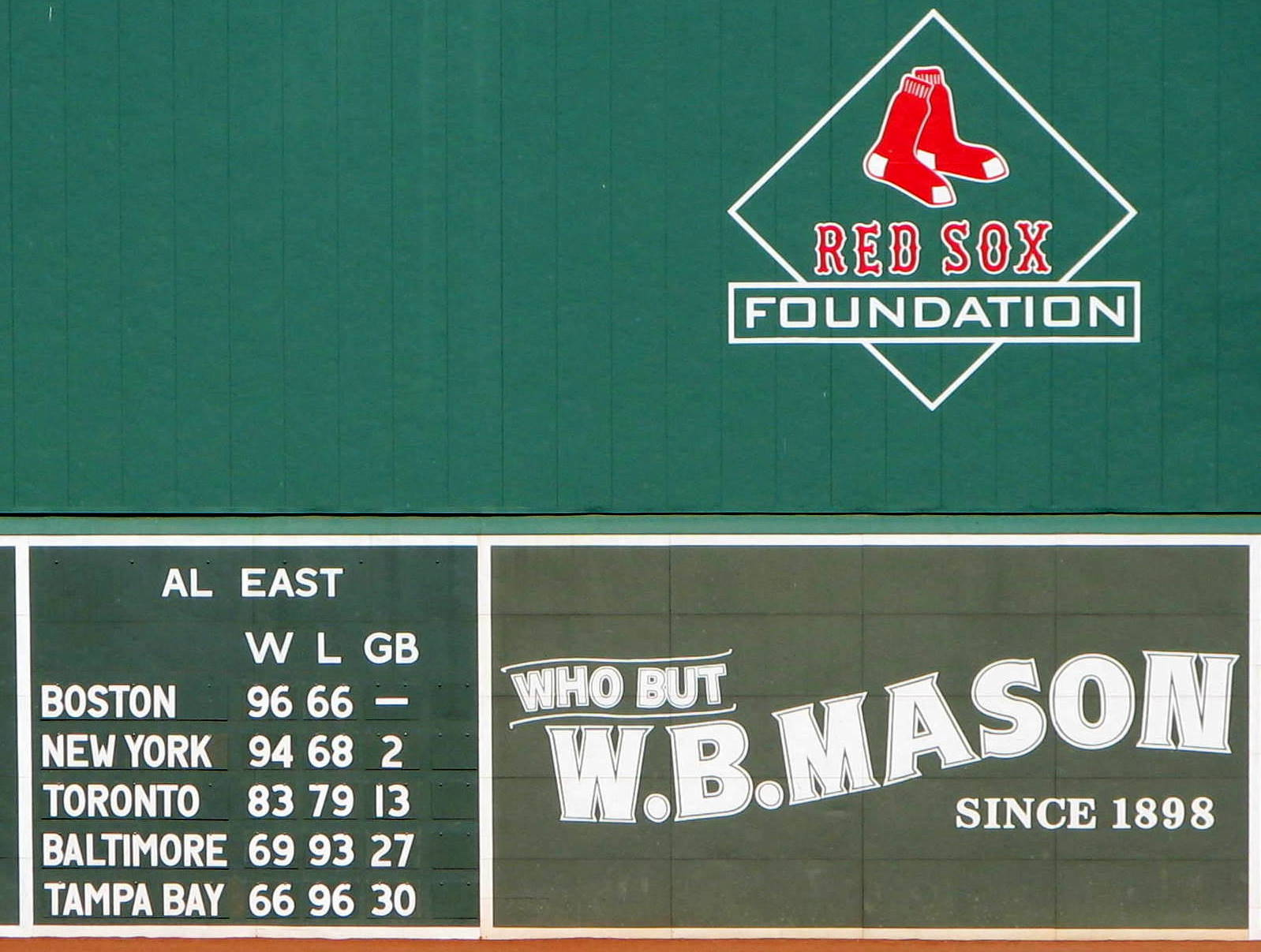
2007 season final standing

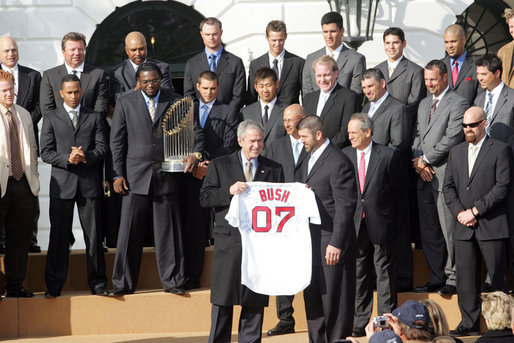
Victorious Red Sox players being honored at the White House by President George W. Bush

The 2005 AL East was decided on the last weekend of the season, with the Yankees coming to Fenway Park with a one-game lead in the standings. The Red Sox won two of the three games to finish the season with the same record as the Yankees, 95–67. However, a playoff was not needed, as the loser of such a playoff would still make the playoffs as a wild card team. As the Yankees had won the season series, they were awarded the division title, and the Red Sox competed in the playoffs as the wild card team. Boston failed to defend their championship, and was swept in three games by the eventual 2005 World Series champion Chicago White Sox in the first round of the playoffs. In 2006 David Ortiz broke Jimmie Foxx's single-season Red Sox home run record by hitting 54 homers. However, Boston failed to make the playoffs after compiling a 9–21 record in the month of August due to several injuries in the club's roster.

Theo Epstein's first step toward restocking the team for 2007 was to pursue one of the most anticipated acquisitions in baseball history. On November 14, MLB announced that Boston had won the bid for the rights to negotiate a contract with Japanese Nippon Professional Baseball superstar pitcher Daisuke Matsuzaka. Boston placed a bid of $51.1 million to negotiate with Matsuzaka and completed a 6-year, $52 million contract after they were announced as the winning bid.

The Red Sox moved into first place in the AL East by mid-April and never relinquished their division lead. Initially, rookie second baseman Dustin Pedroia under-performed, hitting below.200 in April. Manager Terry Francona refused to bench him and his patience paid off as Pedroia eventually won the AL Rookie of the Year Award for his performance that season, which included 165 hits and a.317 batting average. On the mound, Josh Beckett emerged as the ace of the staff with his first 20-win season, as fellow starting pitchers Schilling, Matsuzaka, Wakefield and Julián Tavárez all struggled at times. Relief pitcher Hideki Okajima, another recent arrival from the NPB, posted an ERA of 0.88 through the first half and was selected for the All-Star Game. Okajima finished the season with a 2.22 ERA and 5 saves, emerging as one of baseball's top relievers. Minor league call-up Clay Buchholz provided a spark on September 1 by pitching a no-hitter in his second career start. The Red Sox captured their first AL East title since 1995.

The Red Sox swept the Angels in the ALDS. Facing the Cleveland Indians in the ALCS, the Red Sox fell in games 2, 3, and 4 before Beckett picked up his second victory of the series in game 5, starting a comeback. The Red Sox captured their twelfth American League pennant by outscoring the Indians 30–5 over the final three games. The Red Sox faced the Colorado Rockies in the 2007 World Series, and swept the Rockies in four games. In Game 4, Wakefield gave up his spot in the rotation to a recovered Jon Lester, who gave the Red Sox an impressive start, pitching 5 2/3 shutout innings. Key home runs late in the game by third baseman Mike Lowell and pinch-hitter Bobby Kielty secured the Red Sox' second title in four years, as Lowell was named Most Valuable Player in the World Series.

==== 2008–2012: Injuries and collapses ====
The Red Sox began their season by participating in the third opening day game in MLB history to be played in Japan, where they defeated the Oakland A's in the Tokyo Dome. On May 19, Jon Lester threw the 18th no-hitter in team history, defeating the Kansas City Royals 7–0. Down the stretch, outfielder Manny Ramirez became embroiled in controversy surrounding public incidents with fellow players and other team employees, as well as criticism of ownership and not playing, which some claimed was due to laziness and nonexistent injuries. The front office decided to move the disgruntled outfielder at the July 31 trade deadline, shipping him to the Dodgers in a three-way deal with the Pittsburgh Pirates that landed them Jason Bay to replace him in left field. With Ramirez gone, and Bay providing a new spark in the lineup, the Red Sox improved vastly and made the playoffs as the AL Wild Card. The Red Sox defeated the Angels in the 2008 ALDS three games to one. The Red Sox then took on their AL East rivals the Tampa Bay Rays in the ALCS. Down three games to one in the 5th game of the ALCS, Boston mounted a comeback from trailing 7–0 in the 7th inning to win 8–7. They tied the series at three games apiece with a Game 6 victory before losing Game 7, 3–1, thus becoming the eighth team in a row since 2000 to fail to repeat as World Series champions.

The Red Sox returned to postseason play in 2009 but were swept in the ALDS by the Los Angeles Angels. In 2010, they placed third in the division and failed to make the playoffs. In 2011, the Red Sox collapsed, becoming the first team in MLB history to blow a 9-game lead in the division heading into September, going 7–20 in the final month and failing again to make the playoffs. In December 2011, Bobby Valentine was hired as a new manager. The 2012 season marked the centennial of Fenway Park, and on April 20, past and present Red Sox players and coaches assembled to celebrate the park's anniversary. However, the collapse that they endured in September 2011 carried over into the season. The Red Sox struggled throughout the season due to injuries, inconsistent play, and off-field news. They finished 69–93 for their first losing season since 1997 and their worst season since 1965.

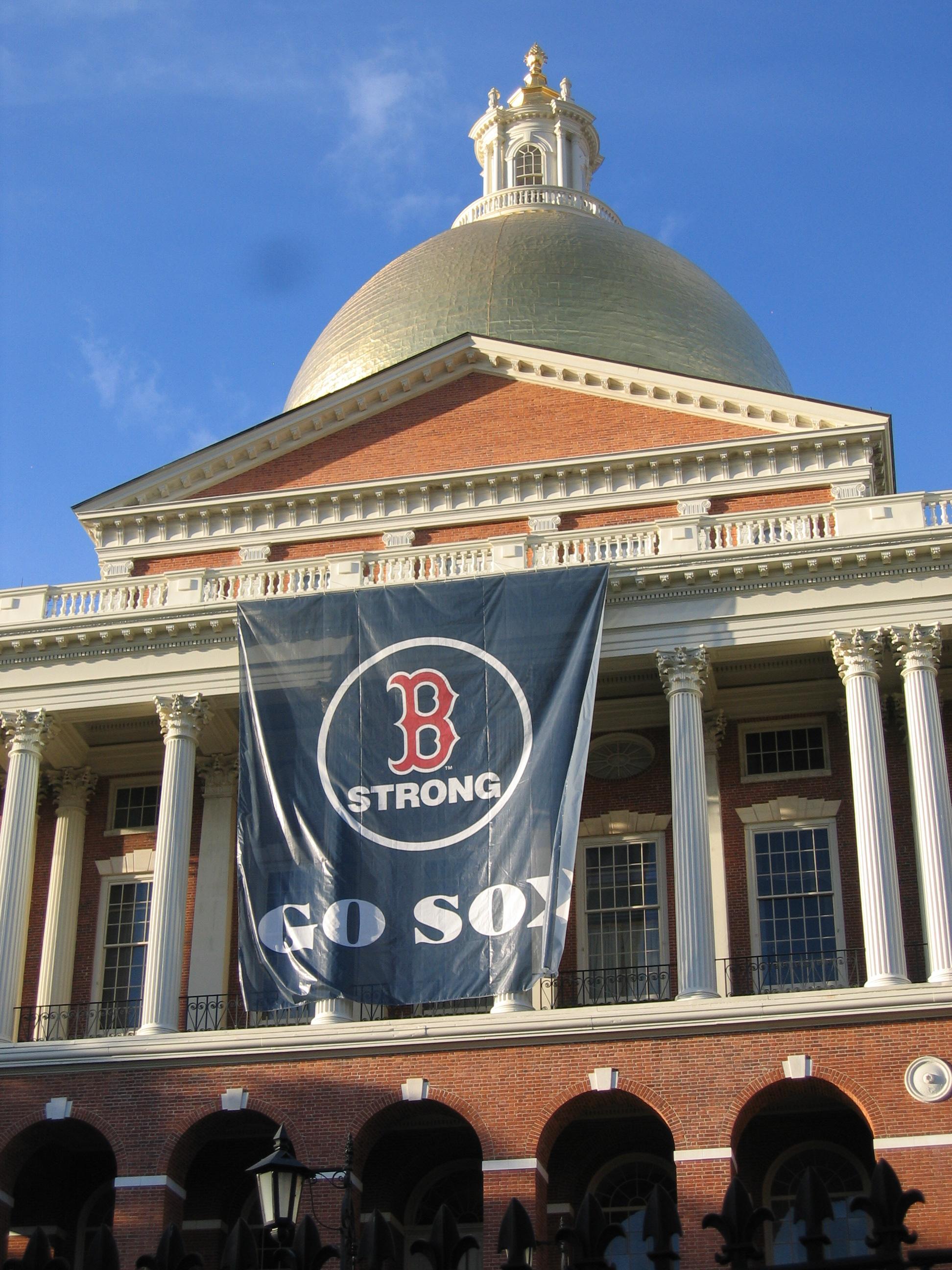
The Massachusetts State House displaying a banner in honor of the Red Sox's 2013 World Series appearance. "B Strong" was a patch worn by the Red Sox in memory of Boston Marathon bombing victims.

==== Boston Strong: 2013 World Series Champions ====
Boston, which finished last in the American League East with a 69–93 record in 2012 (26 games behind the Yankees), became the 11th team in major league history to go from worst in the division to first the next season when it clinched the A.L. East division title on September 20, 2013. Many credit the team's turnaround with the hiring of manager John Farrell, the former Red Sox pitching coach under Terry Francona from 2007 to 2010. As a former member of the staff, he had the respect of influential players such as Lester, Pedroia, and Ortiz. But there were other moves made in the offseason by general manager Ben Cherington who targeted "character" players to fill the team's needs. These acquisitions included veteran catcher David Ross, Jonny Gomes, Mike Napoli and Shane Victorino. While some questioned these players as "re-treads", it was clear that Cherington was trying to move past 2011–2012 by bringing in "clubhouse players". Essential to the turnaround, however, was the pitching staff. With ace veteran John Lackey coming off Tommy John surgery and both Jon Lester and Clay Buchholz returning to their prior form, this allowed the team to rely less on their bullpen. Everything seemed in danger of collapsing, however, when both closers, Joel Hanrahan and Andrew Bailey, went down early with season-ending injuries. Farrell gave the closing job to Koji Uehara on June 21 who delivered with a 1.09 ERA and an MLB record 0.565 WHIP. On September 11, the 37-year-old right-hander set a new Red Sox record when he retired 33 straight batters. Other reasons include the trade deadline acquisition of pitcher Jake Peavy when the Red Sox were in second place in the AL East, the depth of the bench with players such as Mike Carp and rookies Jackie Bradley Jr. and Xander Bogaerts, and the re-emergence of players such as Will Middlebrooks and Daniel Nava. On September 28, 2013, the team secured home field advantage throughout the American League playoffs when their closest competition, the Oakland Athletics, lost. The next day, the team finished the season going 97–65, the best record in the American League and tied with the St. Louis Cardinals for the best record in baseball. They proceeded to defeat the St. Louis Cardinals in the 2013 World Series, four games to two. The Red Sox became the first team since the 1991 Minnesota Twins to win the World Series a year after finishing in last place, and the second overall. The 2012 Red Sox's.426 winning percentage was the lowest for a team in a season prior to a World Series championship.

Throughout the season, the Red Sox players and organization formed a close association with the city of Boston and its people in relation to the Boston Marathon bombing that occurred on April 15, 2013. On April 20, the day after the alleged bombers were captured, David Ortiz gave a pre-game speech following a ceremony honoring the victims and the local law enforcement, in which he stated, "This is our fucking city! And nobody is going to dictate our freedom! Stay strong!" For the entirety of the season, the team wore an additional arm patch that exhibited the Red Sox "B" logo and the word "Strong" within a blue circle. The team also hung up in the dugout a custom jersey that read "Boston Strong" with the number 617, representing the city of Boston's area code. On many occasions during the season, victims of the attack and law enforcement involved were given the honor of throwing the ceremonial first pitch. Following their victory in the 2013 World Series, the first one clinched at home in Fenway Park since 1918, Red Sox players Jonny Gomes and Jarrod Saltalamacchia performed a ceremony during the team's traditional duck boat victory parade, in which they placed the World Series trophy and the custom 617 jersey on the Boston Marathon finish line on Boylston Street, followed by a moment of silence and the singing of "God Bless America". This ceremony helped the city "reclaim" its spirit that was lost after the bombing. Overall, the Red Sox team and organization played a role in the healing process after the tragedy, owing to the team's unifying effect on the city.

==== 2014–2017 ====
Following the 2013 championship, the team finished last in the AL East during 2014 with a record of 71–91, and again in 2015 with a record of 78–84. On September 12, 2015, David Ortiz hit his 500th career home run off Matt Moore in Tropicana Field becoming the 27th player in MLB history to achieve that prestigious milestone; in November 2015, Ortiz announced that the 2016 season was to be his last.

The Red Sox had a record of 93–69 and won their division in 2016, with six American League All-Stars, the AL Cy Young Award winner in Rick Porcello, and the runner-up for the AL Most Valuable Player Award, Mookie Betts. Rookie Andrew Benintendi established himself in the Red Sox outfield, and Steven Wright emerged as one of the year's biggest surprises. The Red Sox grabbed the lead in the AL East early and held on to it throughout the year, which included many teams honoring Ortiz throughout the season. Despite the success, the team lost five of their last six games of the regular season and were swept in the ALDS by the eventual American League Champion Cleveland Indians. The Red Sox once again finished with a record of 93–69 in 2017 and repeated as division champions. The team went 5–5 in their last ten regular-season games and were eliminated by the Houston Astros in the ALDS in four games. The Red Sox subsequently fired their manager, John Farrell, and hired Alex Cora, signing him to a three-year deal.

==== "Damage done": 2018 World Series Championship ====
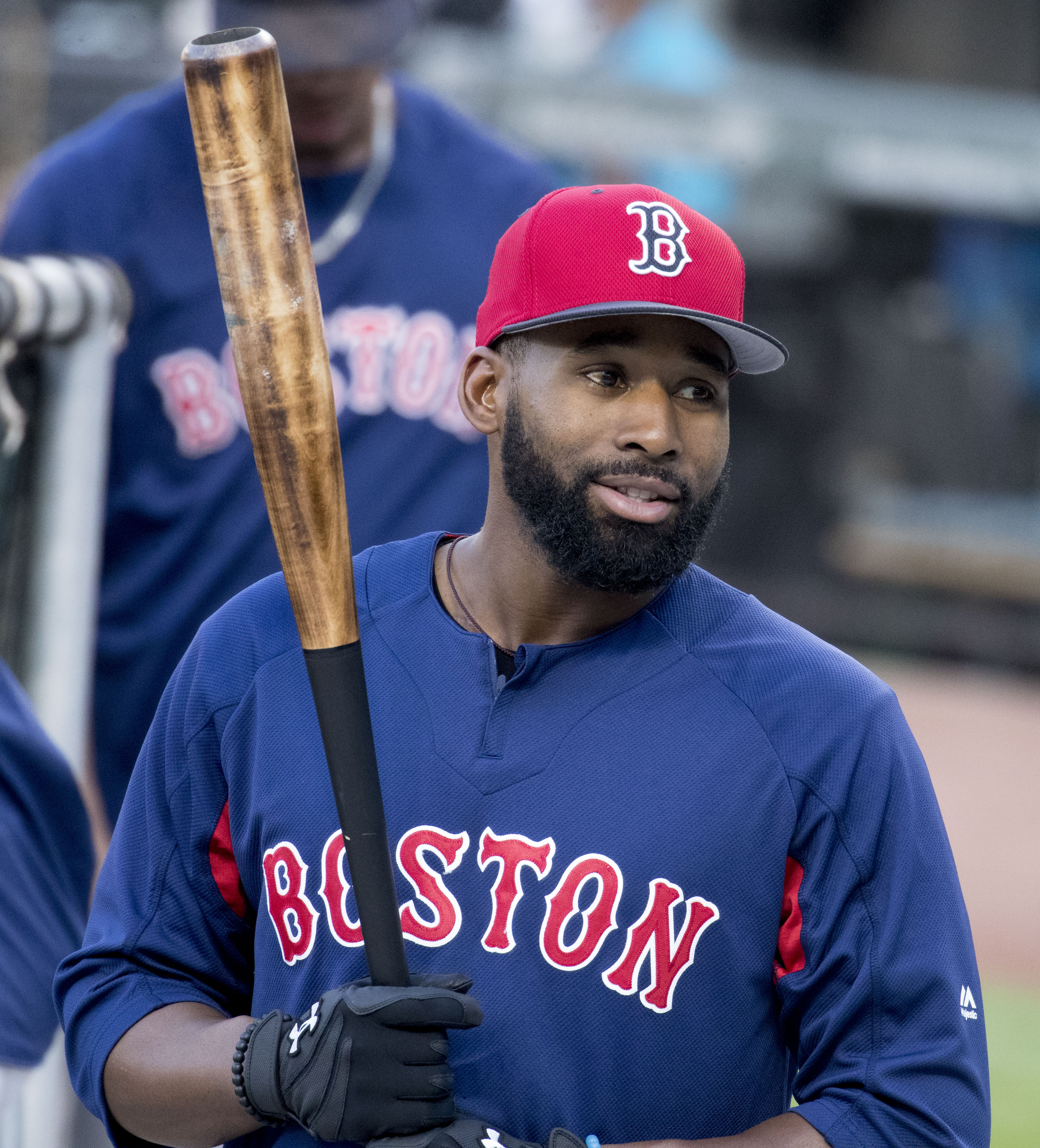
2018 ALCS MVP – Jackie Bradley Jr.

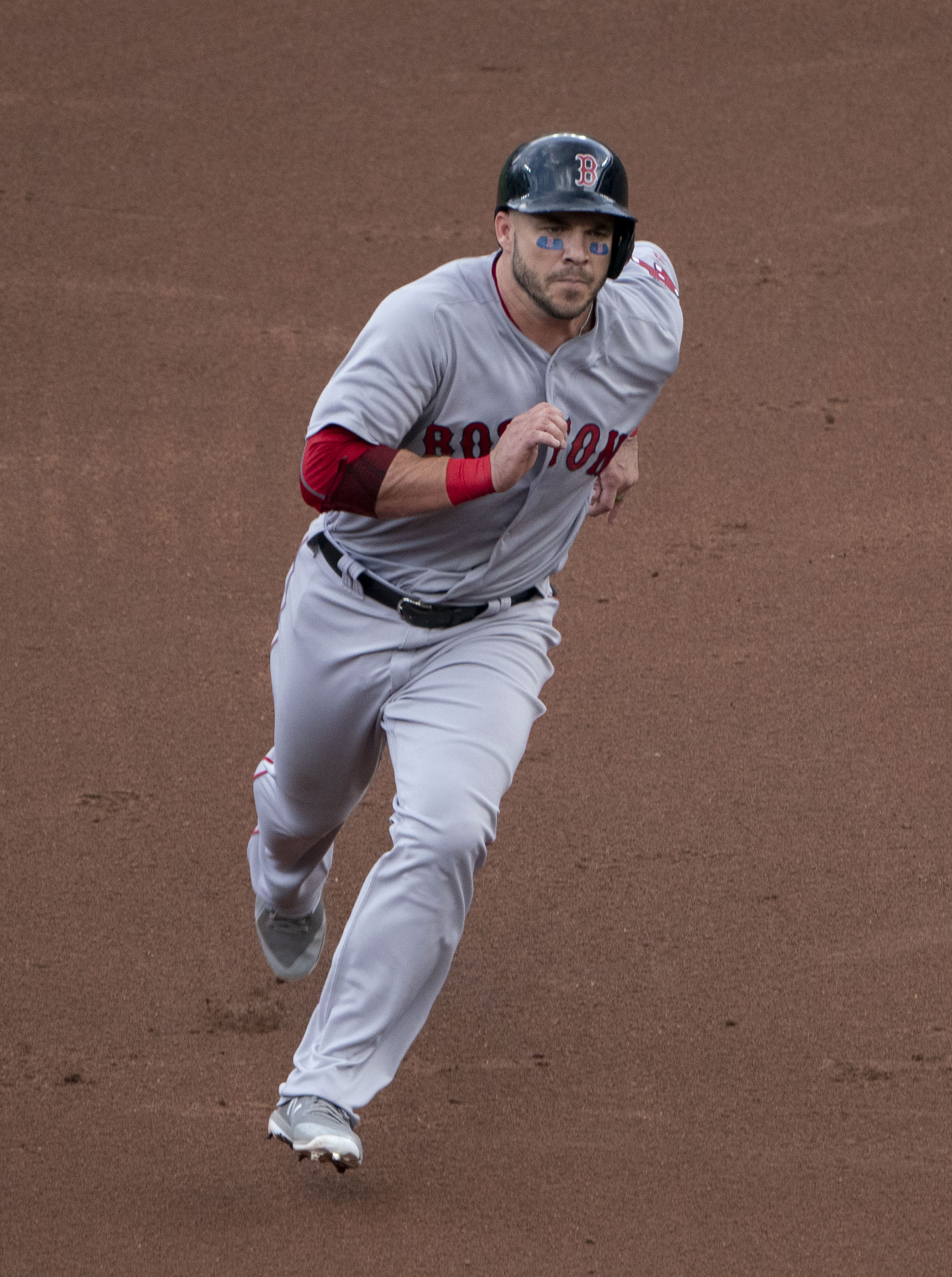
2018 World Series MVP – Steve Pearce

The Red Sox finished with a 108–54 (.667) record, winning the American League East division title for the third consecutive season, eight games ahead of the second-place New York Yankees, and were the first team to clinch a berth in the 2018 postseason. The Red Sox surpassed the 100-win mark for the first time since 1946, broke the franchise record of 105 wins that had been set in 1912, and won the most games of any MLB team since the 2001 Seattle Mariners won 116. The 2018 Red Sox were led by All-Stars Mookie Betts, J. D. Martinez, Chris Sale, and Craig Kimbrel. Betts led baseball in batting average and slugging percentage, while Martinez led in runs batted in. Sale tossed only 158 innings due to a shoulder injury late in the year, but was otherwise superb, posting a 2.11 earned run average to go along with 237 strikeouts. Kimbrel saved 42 games and struck out 96 batters.

The Red Sox entered the postseason as the top seed in the American League, and defeated the New York Yankees (100–62) in four games in the Division Series. Next, they defeated the defending champion Houston Astros (103–59) in five games in the League Championship Series. Boston then defeated the Los Angeles Dodgers (92–71) in five games in the World Series, for the team's fourth championship in 15 years and ninth in franchise history. The team's motto during the season, "do damage", became "damage done" upon their victory.

Based on these exploits, the team is considered the best MLB team of the 2010s, one of the best Red Sox teams ever, and one of the best baseball teams since the 1998 New York Yankees.

==== 2019–present: Decline and mixed results ====
Despite retaining most players from the 2018 championship team, the 2019 Red Sox won 24 fewer games, finishing third in the division and missing the playoffs for the first time since 2015. President of Baseball Operations Dave Dombrowski was dismissed following a September loss to the Yankees. On October 28, the Red Sox hired Chaim Bloom as his replacement on a five-year contract, with the title of Chief Baseball Officer.

On January 7, 2020, it was reported in The Athletic that the Red Sox had used their video replay room to steal signs during their 2018 season. On January 15, the Red Sox and manager Alex Cora agreed to mutually part ways after he was named in the MLB's report about the Houston Astros sign stealing scandal, which occurred during his tenure as bench coach with the 2017 Astros. Ron Roenicke was subsequently named Boston's interim manager. On February 10, a trade of Mookie Betts and David Price to the Los Angeles Dodgers was made official, in a move seen as a salary dump by analysts, although denied by Red Sox executives. In March, the start of the MLB season was indefinitely postponed, due to the COVID-19 pandemic. In April, the MLB's investigation into 2018 sign-stealing resulted in a finding of improper actions by the team's replay operator, who as a result was suspended for the 2020 season, and the team forfeited their second-round selection in the 2020 MLB draft. The "interim" tag was subsequently removed from Roenicke's title. The team struggled throughout their abbreviated 60-game regular season, contested July 24 through September 27, finishing in last place in the AL East division, with a record of 24–36. Prior to the final regular season game, management announced that Roenicke would not return as manager for the 2021 season.

Alex Cora returned as manager for the 2021 season, with the team finishing at 92–70 and qualifying for the postseason as the fourth seed in the AL. The Red Sox defeated the Yankees in the AL Wild Card Game, and defeated the Rays in the Division Series, but were eliminated by the Astros in the League Championship Series. The 2022 season was much less successful, with the team finishing in last place within their division with a 78–84 record, the first losing record for the team in a 162-game season since 2015. In 2023, the Red Sox once again finished in last place in their division with a 78–84 record.

Bloom was fired on September 14, 2023. His replacement, Craig Breslow, an executive with the Chicago Cubs and former pitcher for the Red Sox, was hired on October 25, 2023.

Expectations were not high going into Breslow's first year at the helm. Many analysts and fans throughout the game believed that the Red Sox hadn't done enough throughout the 2024 offseason to improve their roster, especially after chairman Tom Werner claimed the team would go "full throttle". The frustration even reached the players, with star player Rafael Devers publicly voicing out his frustration with the team for not doing enough. This led to much speculation around baseball believing that John Henry's interest in the team had waned, especially due to his ventures into other sports. However, despite a mediocre 81–81 2024 season where the Red Sox once again missed the playoffs, there was some upside, with major prospects Kristian Campbell, Marcelo Mayer, and Roman Anthony making national headlines, and center fielder Jarren Duran winning the All-Star Game MVP.

Entering the 2024–25 offseason, Red Sox fans were hoping to push forward and make more improvements than the prior offseason. Although the offseason started off slow, the Red Sox made two major moves to improve their team, trading for Chicago White Sox ace Garrett Crochet and signing free-agent third baseman Alex Bregman. The Red Sox flipped the script, and entered the 2025 season as contenders for the American League title. The team finished third in the AL East and went on to lose to the Yankees in the AL Wild Card Series. In the offseason, Bregman opted out of his contract and subsequently signed with the Chicago Cubs.

The 2026 season began with eight losses in the team's first 10 games. After the team struggled to a 10–17 record, manager Alex Cora and multiple coaches were let go on April 25, with Worcester Red Sox manager Chad Tracy named as the team's interim manager. After a disappointing start, the Red Sox turned their season around in July with a 15-game winning streak, tying a franchise record set in 1946. They went 21–4 that month, and their .840 winning percentage was the best for any calendar month in franchise history. They finished the season 87–75 and lost to the Yankees in the AL Wild Card Series for a second consecutive year.

== Roster ==
Boston Red Sox 2027 spring training roster
40-man roster		Non-roster invitees	Coaches / other
Pitchers: 66 Brayan Bello; 64 Jake Bennett; 44 Aroldis Chapman; 50 Kutter Crawford; 35 Garrett Crochet; 68 Alec Gamboa; 41 Tyron Guerrero; 89 Tanner Houck; 67 Erik Miller; 47 Jovani Morán; 75 Wyatt Olds; 29 Johan Oviedo; 65 Jedixson Páez; 78 Tyler Samaniego; 63 Justin Slaten; 55 Ranger Suárez; 70 Payton Tolle; 57 Greg Weissert; 22 Garrett Whitlock	Catchers: -- Nick Fortes; 31 Adley Rutschman; Infielders: 18 Jake Bauers; 36 Triston Casas; 40 Willson Contreras; 5 Caleb Durbin; 11 Curtis Mead; 32 Andruw Monasterio; 48 Anthony Seigler; 20 Nick Sogard; 10 Trevor Story; Outfielders: 52 Wilyer Abreu; 19 Roman Anthony; 28 Kristian Campbell; 16 Jarren Duran; 3 Ceddanne Rafaela; 38 Eli White; Designated hitters: 30 Mickey Gasper; 23 Romy González; 37 Jahmai Jones; 7 Masataka Yoshida	Pitchers: -- Miguel Arias; Catchers: -- Riley Adams; Outfielders: -- Duke Ellis	Manager: 17 Chad Tracy; Coaches: 53 Andrew Bailey (pitching); 83 Pablo Cabrera (first base/outfield, interim); 81 Chad Epperson (third base, interim); 58 José David Flores (bench, interim); 86 Parker Guinn (bullpen catcher/catching instructor); 84 Collin Hetzler (interim hitting); 59 Chris Holt (bullpen); 88 Nelson Paulino (hitting, interim); 82 Devin Rose (pitching strategist); 92 Jack Simonetty (interim hitting assistant); 85 John Soteropulos (hitting); 40 active, 0 inactive, 3 non-roster invitees; 7-, 10-, or 15-day injured list; * Not on active roster; ^{†} Suspended list; Roster, coaches, and NRIs updated November 20, 2026; Transactions • Depth chart; → All MLB rosters

== Ballpark ==
The Red Sox have played their home games at Fenway Park since 1912, making the ballpark the oldest active ballpark in Major League Baseball, as well as the oldest active venue across the four major North American sports leagues (MLB, NBA, NFL, and NHL). Previously, the team played at the Huntington Avenue Grounds from its inception in 1901 through 1911.

=== Regular season home attendance ===
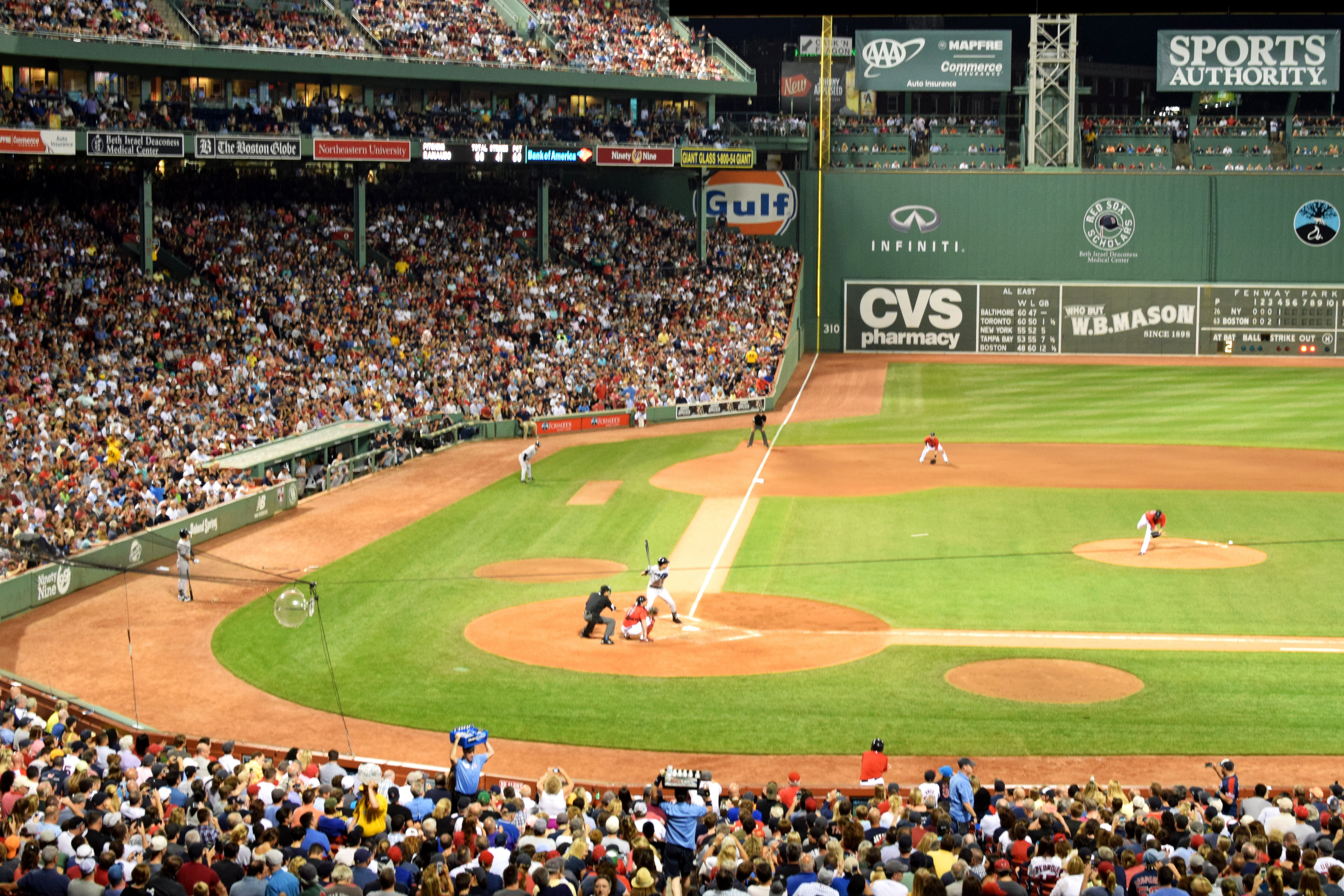
Left field grandstands during a 2014 game

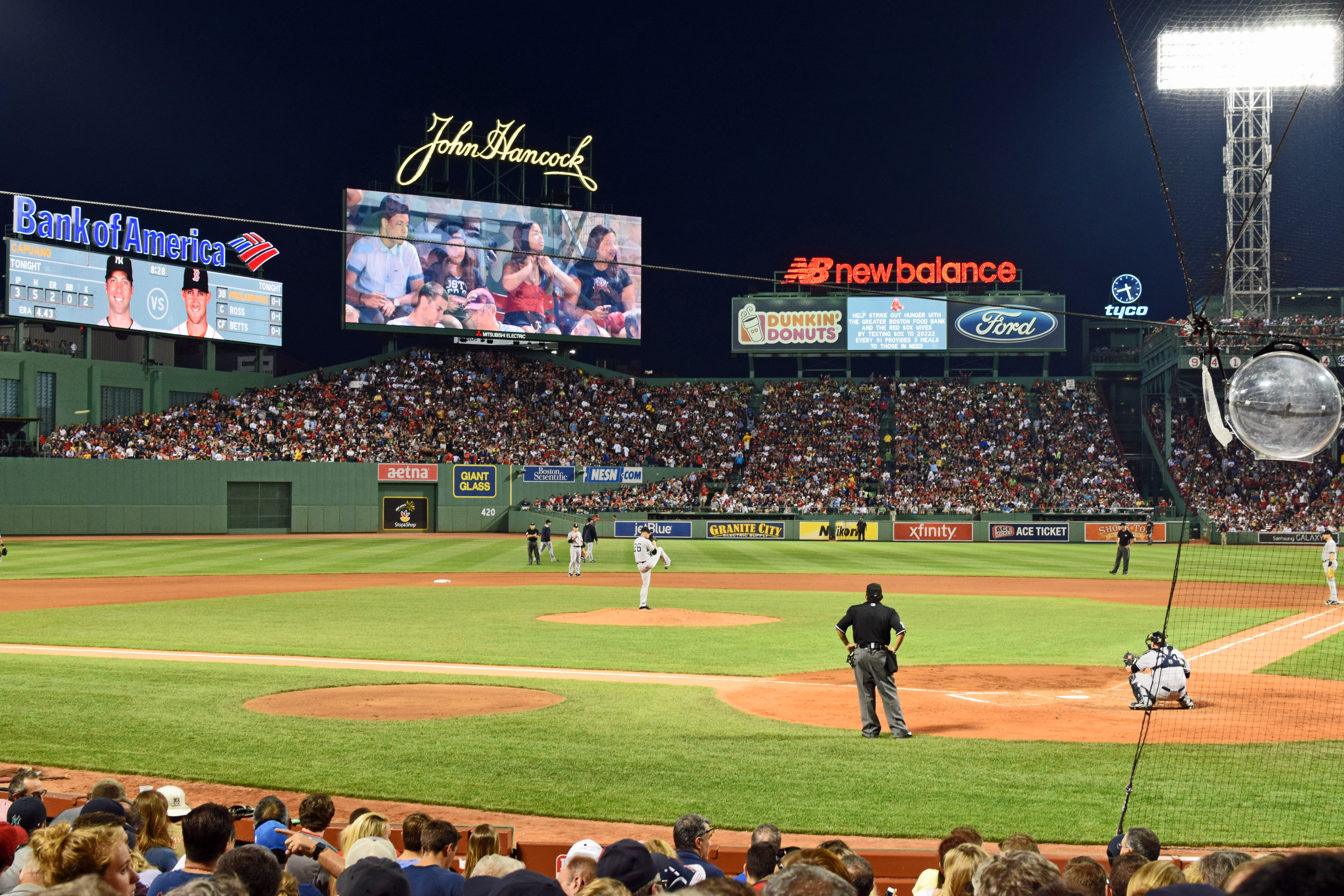
Center field bleachers during a 2014 game

Between May 15, 2003, and April 10, 2013, the Red Sox sold out every home game at Fenway park. The 820-game streak is a record for all major American sports, narrowly passing the Portland Trail Blazers record of 814 between 1977 and 1995. The previous major league baseball record had been held by the Cleveland Indians, who sold out 455 games between June 12, 1995, and April 2, 2001.

Home attendance at Fenway Park
Year	Total attendance	Game average	League rank
2000	2,585,895	31,925	6th
2001	2,625,333	32,412	6th
2002	2,650,862	32,727	4th
2003	2,724,165	33,632	4th
2004	2,837,294	35,028	4th
2005	2,847,888	35,159	3rd
2006	2,930,588	36,180	4th
2007	2,970,755	36,676	4th
2008	3,048,250	37,633	4th
2009	3,062,699	37,811	3rd
2010	3,046,445	37,610	4th
2011	3,054,001	37,704	4th
2012	3,043,003	37,568	4th
2013	2,833,333	34,979	5th
2014	2,956,089	36,495	3rd
2015	2,880,694	35,564	3rd
2016	2,955,434	36,487	4th
2017	2,917,678	36,021	4th
2018	2,895,575	35,748	4th
2019	2,915,502	35,994	3rd
2020†	—	—	—
2021†	1,725,323	21,300	4th
2022	2,625,089	32,409	4th
2023	2,672,130	32,989	5th
2024	2,659,949	32,839	4th

† Due to the COVID-19 pandemic, the 2020 season was contested behind closed doors, and some 2021 games were contested with limited attendance per local ordinances.

== Spring training ==
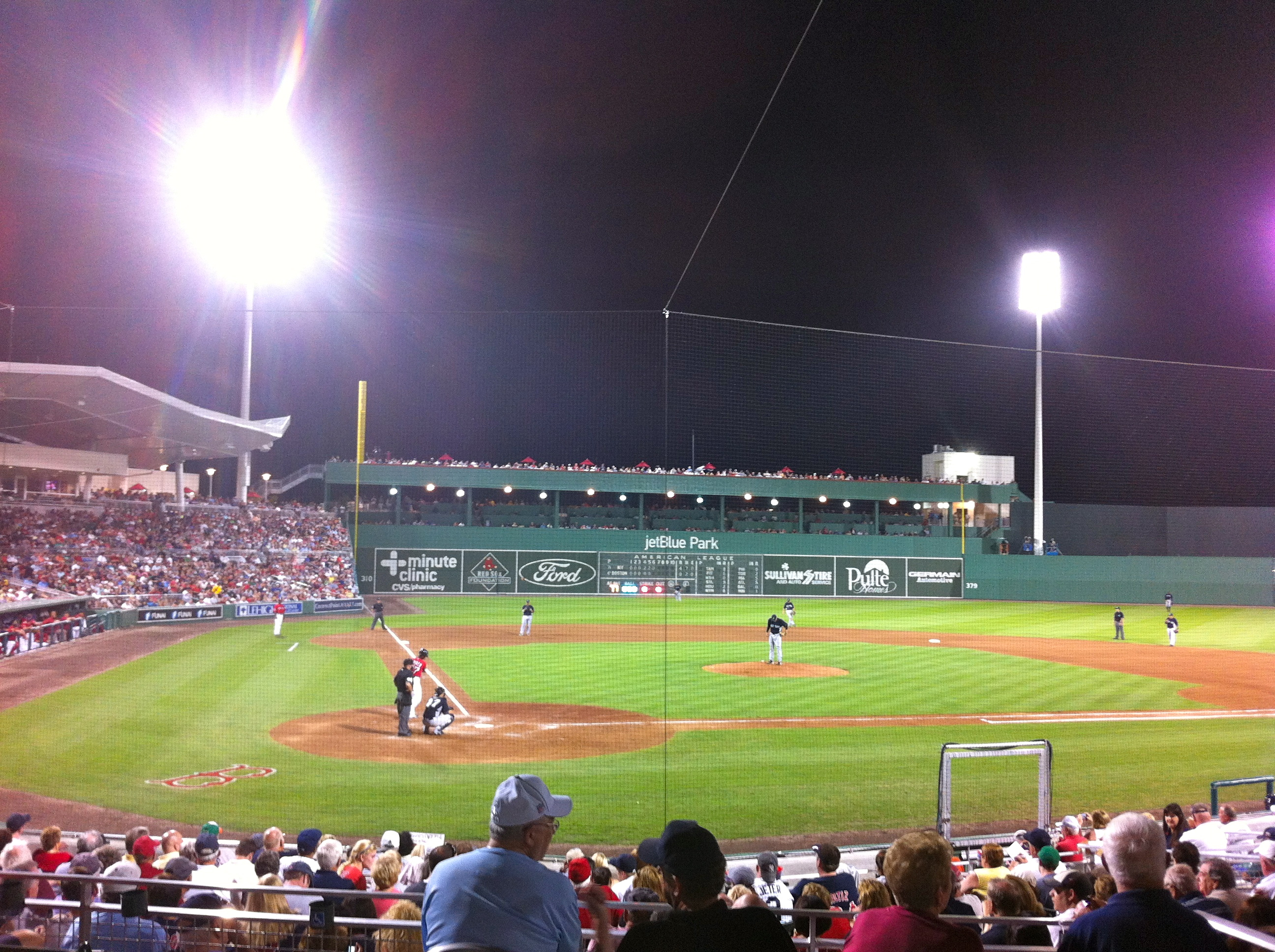
A spring training game at JetBlue Park

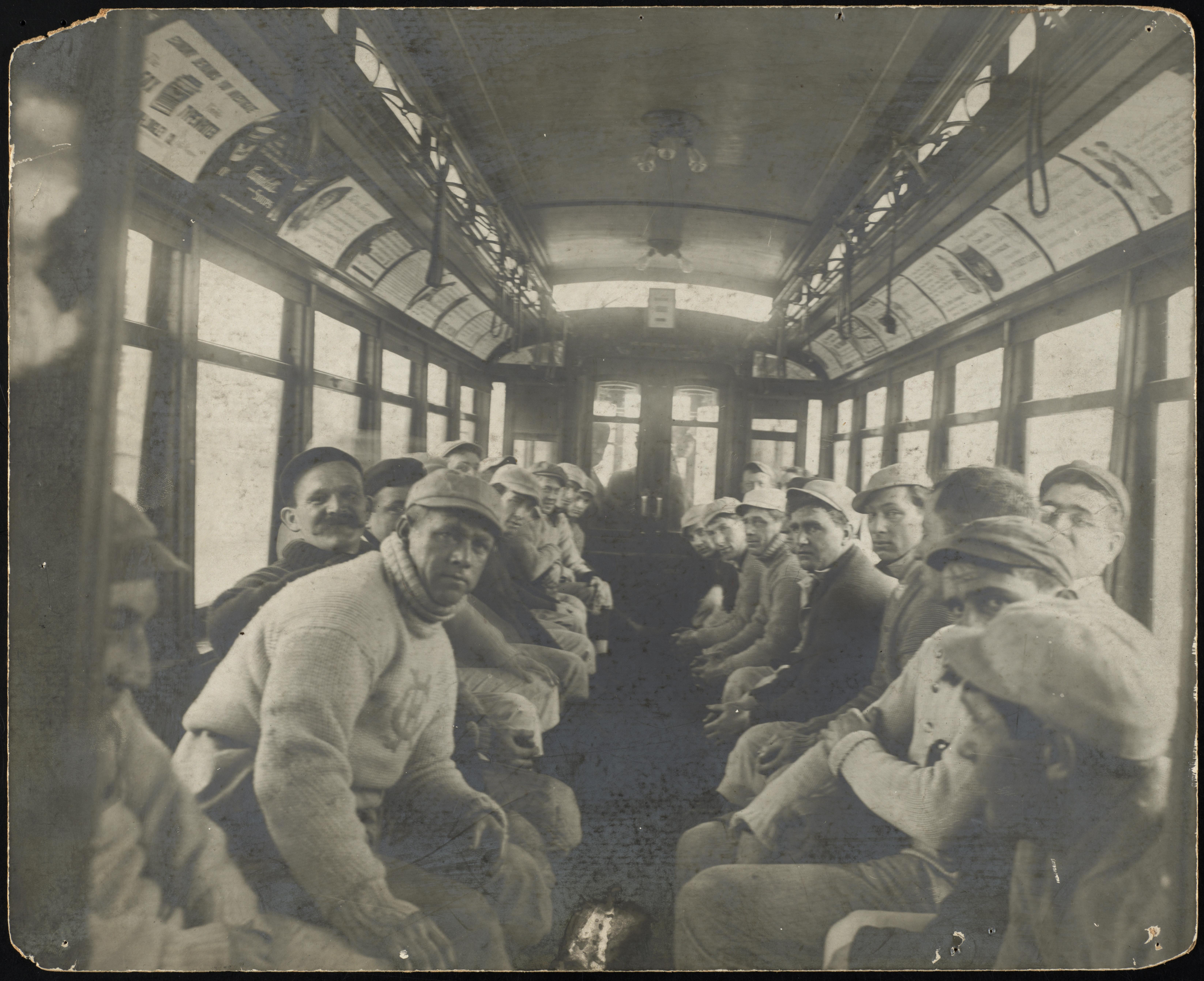
1907: Boston players leaving their hotel in Little Rock for a spring training game (photo courtesy of the Boston Public Library)

The franchise's first spring training was held in Charlottesville, Virginia, in 1901, when the team was known as the Boston Americans. Since 1993, the city of Fort Myers, Florida, has hosted Boston's spring training, first at City of Palms Park, and since 2012 at JetBlue Park at Fenway South.

=== JetBlue Park ===
In October 2008, the Lee County, Florida, Board of Commissioners approved an agreement with the Red Sox to build a new spring training facility for the team. In November 2008, the Red Sox signed an agreement with Lee County intended to keep their spring training home in the Fort Myers area for 30 more years. In April 2009, the Red Sox announced that the new stadium would be located on a 126-acre (51 ha) lot north of Southwest Florida International Airport. In March 2011, the team and JetBlue Airways officials announced that the new field would be named JetBlue Park at Fenway South.

JetBlue Park opened in March 2012. Many characteristics of the stadium have been taken from Fenway Park, including a 37-foot (11 m) Green Monster wall in left field. Included in the wall is a restored version of the manual scoreboard that was housed at Fenway for almost 30 years, beginning in the 1970s. The field dimensions are identical to those at Fenway.

=== Truck Day ===
The unofficial beginning of the spring training season for the Red Sox is Truck Day, the day a tractor-trailer filled with equipment leaves Fenway Park bound for the team's spring training facility in Florida. 2021's Truck Day was February 8.

== Rivalries ==
=== New York Yankees ===
The Red Sox and New York Yankees have been rivals for more than 100 years. The rivalry is often considered one of the oldest, fiercest and most famous rivalries in professional sports.

The rivalry is often a heated subject of conversation in the Northeastern United States. Since the 1995 inception of the wild card team and an added Division Series, every postseason except for 2014 and 2023 has featured one or both of the American League East rivals. The two teams have squared off in the American League Championship Series (ALCS) three times, with the Yankees winning in 1999 and 2003 and the Sox winning in 2004. The teams have faced off in one American League Division Series (ALDS); 2018, won by the Red Sox in four games. The teams have played one American League Wild Card Game on October 5, 2021, which the Red Sox won as well.

The teams have twice met in the last regular-season series to decide the league title, in 1904 (which the Red Sox won) and 1949 (which the Yankees won). The teams also finished tied for first in 1978, when the Yankees won a high-profile one-game playoff for the division title. The 1978 division race is memorable for the Red Sox having held a 14-game lead over the Yankees more than halfway through the season. In 2003, The Red Sox lost in Game 7 of the ALCS on Aaron Boone's walk-off home run. Similarly, the 2004 ALCS is notable for the Yankees leading 3 games to 0 and ultimately losing the best-of-seven series. The Red Sox comeback was the first time in major league history that a team came back from an 0–3 deficit to win a series.

The rivalry is often termed "the best" and "greatest rivalry in all of sports." Games between the two teams often generate a great deal of interest and get extensive media coverage, including being broadcast on national television.

=== Tampa Bay Rays ===
The rivalry between Boston and the Tampa Bay Rays developed in the late 2000s, after the two clubs had their first postseason meeting in the 2008 ALCS. Since then, both teams have won the American League East division a combined seven times. While the rivalry is more recent than Sox' rivalry with the Yankees, it has been called one of the most competitive in modern baseball.

The teams have met three times in the MLB postseason, with the Rays winning the 2008 ALCS and the Red Sox winning the 2013 ALDS and 2021 ALDS.

== Media ==
=== Radio and television ===
The flagship radio station of the Red Sox is WEEI-FM 93.7. Joe Castiglione has broadcast Red Sox games since 1983 (initially assisting Ken Coleman) and has been the lead play-by-play announcer since 1993. Tim Neverett worked with him from 2016 through 2018, but in 2019, WEEI opted for a more conversational format with a variety of commentators (see the above link) alongside Castiglione. Former Red Sox player Lou Merloni has provided color commentary since 2013. Castiglione's predecessors include Curt Gowdy and Ned Martin. He has also worked with play-by-play veterans Bob Starr and Jerry Trupiano. Many stations throughout New England and beyond carry the broadcasts. On August 26, 2024, Rylee Pay and Emma Tiedemann became the first pair of women to call a Red Sox game.

All Red Sox telecasts not shown nationally are available on New England Sports Network (NESN), with Dave O'Brien calling play-by-play, and Kevin Youkilis, Kevin Millar and Will Middlebrooks splitting color commentary duties. Jerry Remy, a former Red Sox second baseman, served as color analyst from 1988 up until his death in 2021. Remy had lung cancer, and would at times step away from broadcasting duties to focus on his health. Former Red Sox pitcher Dennis Eckersley worked as a color commentator for NESN until his retirement following the 2022 season. Several local television stations, including the original WHDH-TV, WNAC-TV (now the current WHDH), WBZ-TV, WSBK-TV, WLVI, WABU, and WFXT, broadcast Red Sox games prior to 2006, when NESN became the exclusive home of the team.

=== Music ===
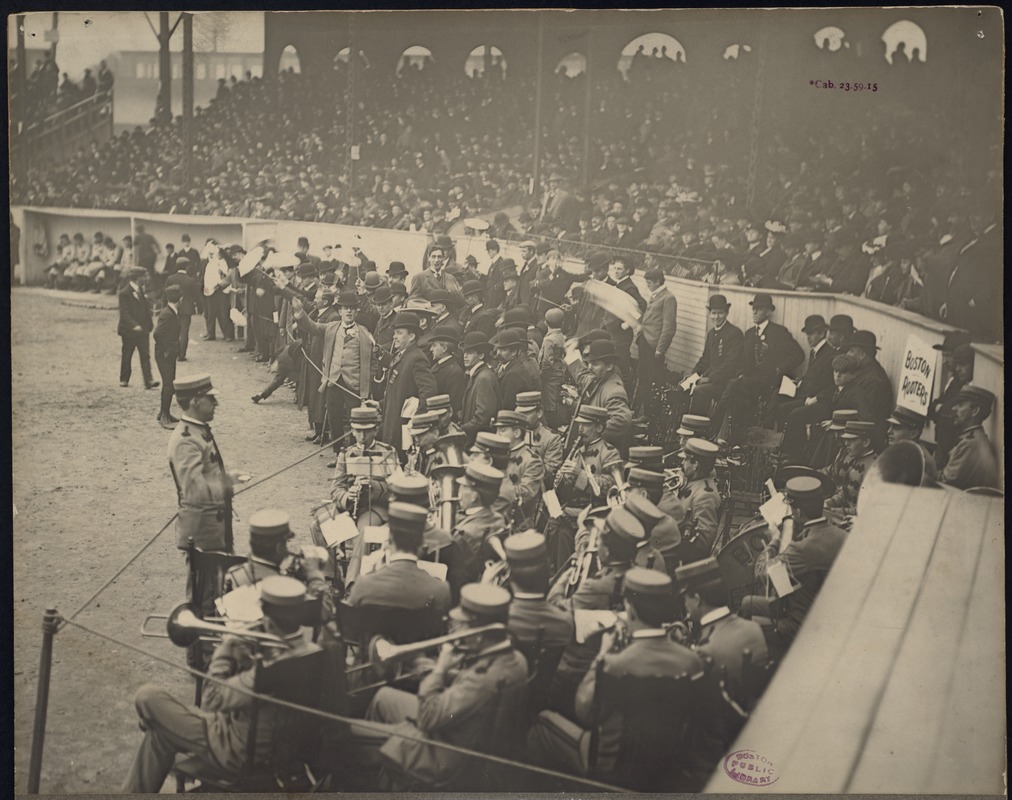
Boston's Royal Rooters singing Tessie during the 1903 World Series

The integration of music into the culture of the Red Sox dates back to the Americans era, which saw the first use of the popular 1902 showtune Tessie as a rallying cry by fans. The tune saw a resurgence in popularity when a new version by Boston area band The Dropkick Murphys was featured in the 2005 film Fever Pitch, which tells the story of an obsessive Red Sox fan. The song is frequently played after home wins and inspired the name of Red Sox mascot Wally the Green Monster's "sister" Tessie. Their song "I'm Shipping Up to Boston" was used to signify the entrance of Boston's closing pitcher.

"Dirty Water" by The Standells is played immediately after the final play of each Red Sox home win, followed by the Dropkick Murphys' "Tessie"

Another song associated with the team and its fan base is Neil Diamond's 1969 single "Sweet Caroline". The song was first introduced to Fenway Park in 1997. By 2002, its play had been established as a nightly occurrence. It continues to be played at every home game during the 8th inning, sung along to by those in attendance. In 2007, Diamond revealed that the song was written for Caroline Kennedy, American diplomat and daughter of Boston icon President John F. Kennedy. Caroline Kennedy's great-grandfather, John F. Fitzgerald, threw Fenway Park's first-ever ceremonial opening pitch on April 20, 1912. When Diamond was named a Kennedy Center Honors recipient in 2011, Red Sox executive assistant Claire Durant arranged for 80 Red Sox fans to travel to Washington for the ceremony, which culminated in them singing the song behind Smokey Robinson onstage.

== Honors and achievements ==
=== Awards ===
For major MLB awards, voted by the Baseball Writers' Association of America (BBWAA), Red Sox players have won the MVP Award 12 times, most recently by Mookie Betts in 2018; the Cy Young Award seven times, most recently by Rick Porcello in 2016; Rookie of the Year six times, most recently by Dustin Pedroia in 2007; and Manager of the Year twice, most recently by Jimy Williams in 1999.

=== Retired numbers ===
Bobby
Doerr
2B
Coach
Retired May 21, 1988
Joe
Cronin
SS
Mgr, GM
Retired May 29, 1984
Johnny
Pesky
SS, 3B
Mgr, Coach
Retired September 23, 2008
Carl
Yastrzemski
LF, 1B, DH

Retired August 6, 1989
Ted
Williams
LF

Retired May 29, 1984
Jim
Rice
LF, DH
Coach
Retired July 28, 2009
Wade
Boggs
3B

Retired May 26, 2016
Carlton
Fisk
C

Retired September 4, 2000
David
Ortiz
DH, 1B

Retired June 23, 2017
Pedro
Martínez
RHP

Retired July 28, 2015
Jackie
Robinson
All MLB

Honored
April 15, 1997

Previously, the Red Sox published three official requirements for a player to have his number retired on their website and in their annual media guides. The requirements were as follows:

1. Election to the National Baseball Hall of Fame
2. At least 10 years played with the Red Sox
3. Finished his career with the club.

These requirements were reconsidered after the election of Carlton Fisk to the Hall of Fame in 2000; who met the first two requirements but played the second half of his career with the Chicago White Sox. As a means of meeting the criteria, then-GM Dan Duquette hired Fisk for one day as a special assistant, which allowed Fisk to technically finish his career with the Red Sox.

In 2008, the Red Sox made an "exception" by retiring number 6 for Johnny Pesky. Pesky neither spent ten years as a player nor was elected to the Baseball Hall of Fame; however, Red Sox ownership cited "... his versatility of his contributions—on the field, off the field, [and] in the dugout ...", including as a manager, scout, and special instructor and decided that the honor had been well-earned. Pesky spent 57 years with the Red Sox organization; as a minor league player (1940–1941), major league player (1942, 1946–1952), minor league manager (1961–1962, 1990), major league manager (1963–1964, 1980), broadcaster (1969–1974), major league coach (1975–1984), and as a special instructor and assistant general manager (1985–2012). Following Pesky's death in 2012, all Red Sox uniformed personnel wore the number 6 for a game against the on August 21.

In 2015, the Red Sox chose to forgo the official criteria and retire Pedro Martínez's number 45. Martínez only spent seven of his 18 seasons in Boston. In justifying the number's retirement, Red Sox principal owner John Henry stated, "To be elected into the Baseball Hall of Fame upon his first year of eligibility speaks volumes regarding Pedro's outstanding career, and is a testament to the respect and admiration so many in baseball have for him." After announcing Martínez's number retirement, the official criteria no longer appeared on the team website nor future media guides. The following year, Wade Boggs' number 26 was retired; Boggs had played 11 seasons with the Red Sox and had been elected to the Hall of Fame in his first year of eligibility 11 years prior, but spent the final seven seasons of his career with the rival New York Yankees and Tampa Bay Devil Rays, and was thus previously ineligible for number retirement under the requirements. The number 26 had been reissued 13 times after Boggs left the club, with infielder Brock Holt switching from 26 to 12 ahead of the 2016 season to accommodate the number retirement.

In 2017, less than eight months after he played the final game of his career, David Ortiz had his number 34 retired by the Red Sox. Ortiz was elected to the Hall of Fame in his first year of eligibility in 2022. To date, Ortiz is the only Red Sox player to have been on the active playoff roster of three World Series championship teams (2004, 2007, 2013) since the issuance of jersey numbers starting in 1931.

The number 42 was officially retired by Major League Baseball in 1997, but Mo Vaughn was one of a handful of players allowed to continue wearing number 42 due to a grandfather clause. He last wore it for the team in 1998. In commemoration of Jackie Robinson Day, MLB invited players to wear the number 42 for games played on April 15, which Coco Crisp (CF), David Ortiz (DH), and DeMarlo Hale (Coach) did in 2007 and again in 2008. Starting in 2009, MLB has had all uniformed personnel for all teams wear number 42 for Jackie Robinson Day.

While not officially retired, the Red Sox have not issued several numbers since the departure of prominent figures who wore them, specifically:

- **15** – Dustin Pedroia 2B (MLB 2006–2019; all with Boston)
- **21** – Roger Clemens RHP (MLB 1984–2007; Boston 1984–1996) (Note: Red Sox catcher Christian Vázquez joined other Puerto Rican MLB players in wearing number 21 on September 10, 2020, to honor Roberto Clemente.)
- **33** – Jason Varitek C (MLB 1997–2011; all with Boston). Varitek reclaimed his #33 while a coach from 2021-2026.
- **49** – Tim Wakefield RHP (MLB 1992–1993, 1995–2011; Boston 1995–2011)

Although not specifically stated why by the team, number 24 has not been issued since the end of the 2018 season when David Price gave up the number "out of respect" for Dwight Evans, whom Price believes will be elected to the Hall of Fame and eventually get his number retired.

There has also been debate in Boston media circles and among fans about the potential retiring of Tony Conigliaro's number 25. Nonetheless, since Conigliaro's last full season in Boston, 1970, the number has never been taken out of circulation and issued to multiple players—notably Troy O'Leary from 1995 to 2001—along with coach Dwight Evans in 2002 and manager Bobby Valentine in 2012.

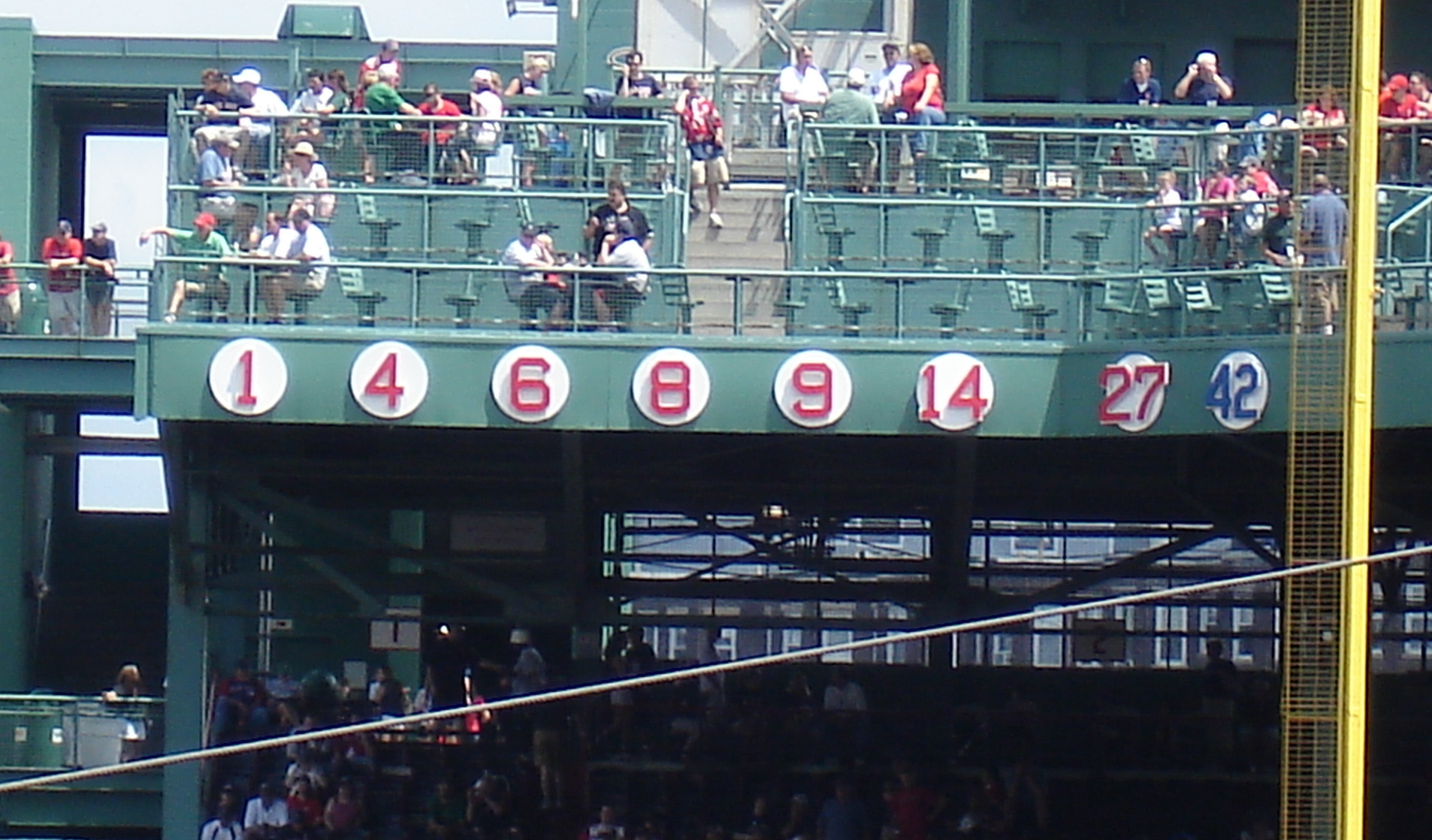
Red Sox retired numbers as of 2009 on the right field facade, displayed in numerical order

Until the late 1990s, the numbers originally hung on the right-field facade in the order in which they were retired: 9–4–1–8. It was pointed out that the numbers, when read as a date (9/4/18), marked the eve of the first game of the 1918 World Series, the last championship series that the Red Sox won before 2004. After the facade was repainted, the numbers were rearranged in numerical order. In 2012, the numbers were rearranged again in chronological order of retirement (9, 4, 1, 8, 27, 6, 14) followed by Robinson's 42. As additional numbers were retired, Robinson's 42 was moved to the right so it remains the right-most number hanging.

=== Baseball Hall of Famers ===
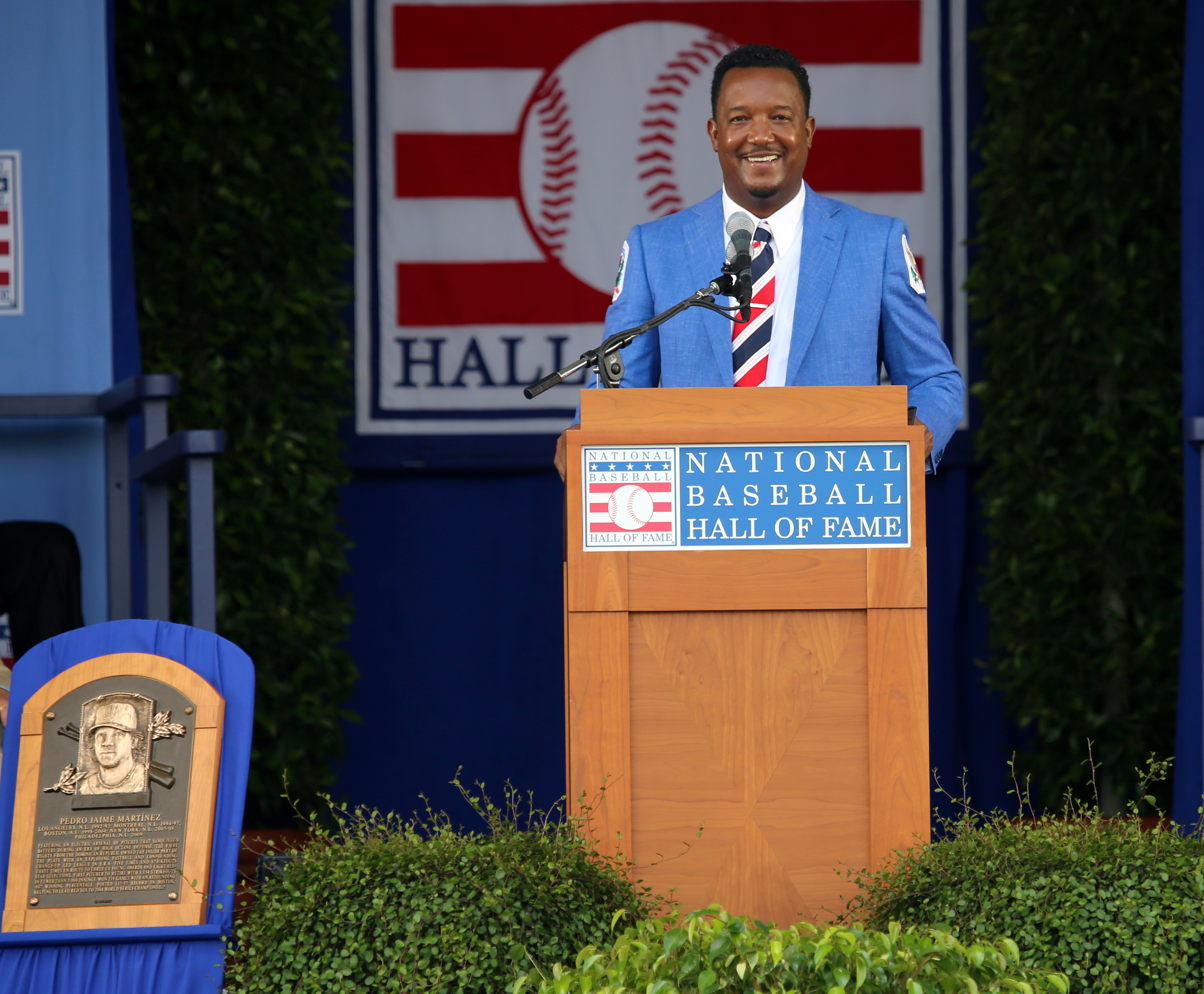
Pedro Martínez was inducted to the National Baseball Hall of Fame in 2015.

Boston Red Sox Hall of Famers
Affiliation according to the National Baseball Hall of Fame and Museum

Luis Aparicio
Adrián Beltré
**Wade Boggs** *
Lou Boudreau
Jesse Burkett
Orlando Cepeda
Jack Chesbro
Jimmy Collins *

**Joe Cronin** *
Andre Dawson
**Bobby Doerr** *
Dennis Eckersley
**Rick Ferrell** *
**Carlton Fisk**
**Jimmie Foxx**
**Lefty Grove**
Rickey Henderson

Harry Hooper*
Waite Hoyt
Ferguson Jenkins
George Kell
Heinie Manush
Juan Marichal
**Pedro Martínez** *
Joe McCarthy

**David Ortiz** *
**Herb Pennock**
Tony Pérez
**Jim Rice** *
Red Ruffing
Babe Ruth
Tom Seaver
Al Simmons
Lee Smith

John Smoltz
Tris Speaker
Billy Wagner
Dick Williams
**Ted Williams** *
**Carl Yastrzemski** *
Tom Yawkey *
Cy Young

- Players and managers listed in **bold** are depicted on their Hall of Fame plaques wearing a Red Sox cap insignia.
- * Boston Red Sox listed as primary team according to the Hall of Fame

==== Ford C. Frick Award recipients ====
Boston Red Sox Ford C. Frick Award recipients
Affiliation according to the National Baseball Hall of Fame and Museum

**Joe Castiglione**

**Curt Gowdy**

Bob Murphy

Ken Harrelson

- **Names in bold** received the award based primarily on their work as broadcasters for the Red Sox.

==== BBWAA Career Excellence Award recipients ====
Several baseball writers, professionally based in Boston while writing about the Red Sox, have been recipients of the BBWAA Career Excellence Award (formerly the J. G. Taylor Spink Award), given for "meritorious contributions to baseball writing". Each of these writers spent at least part of their career with The Boston Globe.

Boston Red Sox BBWAA Career Excellence Award recipients
**Affiliation according to the National Baseball Hall of Fame and Museum**

**Nick Cafardo**; **Peter Gammons**	**Harold Kaese**; **Tim Murnane**	**Dan Shaughnessy**; **Larry Whiteside**

**Names in bold** received the award based primarily on their work covering the Red Sox.

=== Boston Red Sox Hall of Fame ===
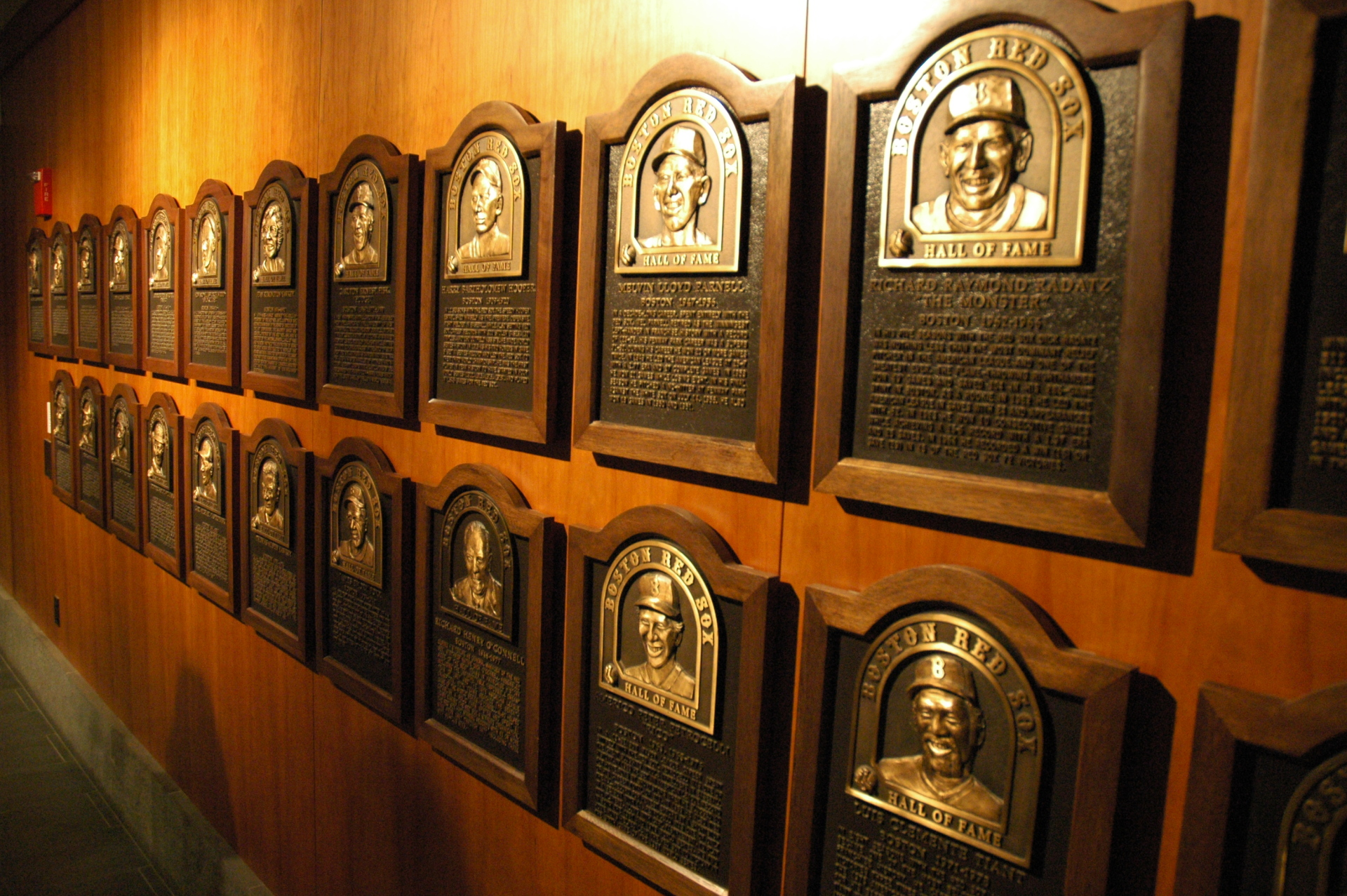
Boston Red Sox Hall of Fame at Fenway Park

Since 1995, the team has maintained its own hall of fame, recognizing distinguished careers of former uniformed and non-uniformed team personnel. Red Sox personnel inducted to the National Baseball Hall of Fame are automatically inducted to the team's hall of fame. Other honorees are chosen via a 15-member selection committee.

=== Notable records and achievements ===
- David Ortiz set the franchise record for home runs in a season with 54 in 2006, surpassing Jimmie Foxx's record of 50 home runs set in 1938.
- On April 22, 2007, Manny Ramírez, J. D. Drew, Mike Lowell, and Jason Varitek hit four consecutive home runs in the 3rd inning off 10 pitches from Chase Wright of the New York Yankees. This was the fifth time in Major League history and the first time in Red Sox history this feat has occurred. Notable is that J. D. Drew had previously contributed to a four consecutive home run sequence on September 18, 2006 (coincidentally also the second batter in the sequence) while with the Los Angeles Dodgers. Additionally, then-Red Sox manager Terry Francona's father, Tito Francona, also was a part of such a four consecutive home run sequence for the Cleveland Indians in 1963.
- On September 22, 2007, with a victory over the Tampa Bay Devil Rays, the Red Sox clinched a spot in the postseason for the fourth time in five years, the first time in club history this has happened. Also, with this postseason berth, manager Terry Francona became the first manager in team history to lead the club to three playoff appearances.
- In 2016, David Ortiz set all-time records for most home runs and runs batted in in a player's final MLB season. Ortiz finished the season with 38 homers, which surpassed Dave Kingman's 35 in 1986, and 127 runs batted in, which surpassed Shoeless Joe Jackson's 123 in 1920.
- The Red Sox set a team record for wins in a regular season with 108 in 2018, surpassing the 106-year-old record of 105 wins set in 1912. Including playoffs, the Red Sox won a total of 119 games, the third most total wins in an MLB season.
- With their victory in the 2018 World Series, the Red Sox became the first team to win four World Series championships in the twenty-first century. They also achieved this with their third (2013) and second (2007) championships in the century respectively, after first winning in 2004.

==== No-hitters ====
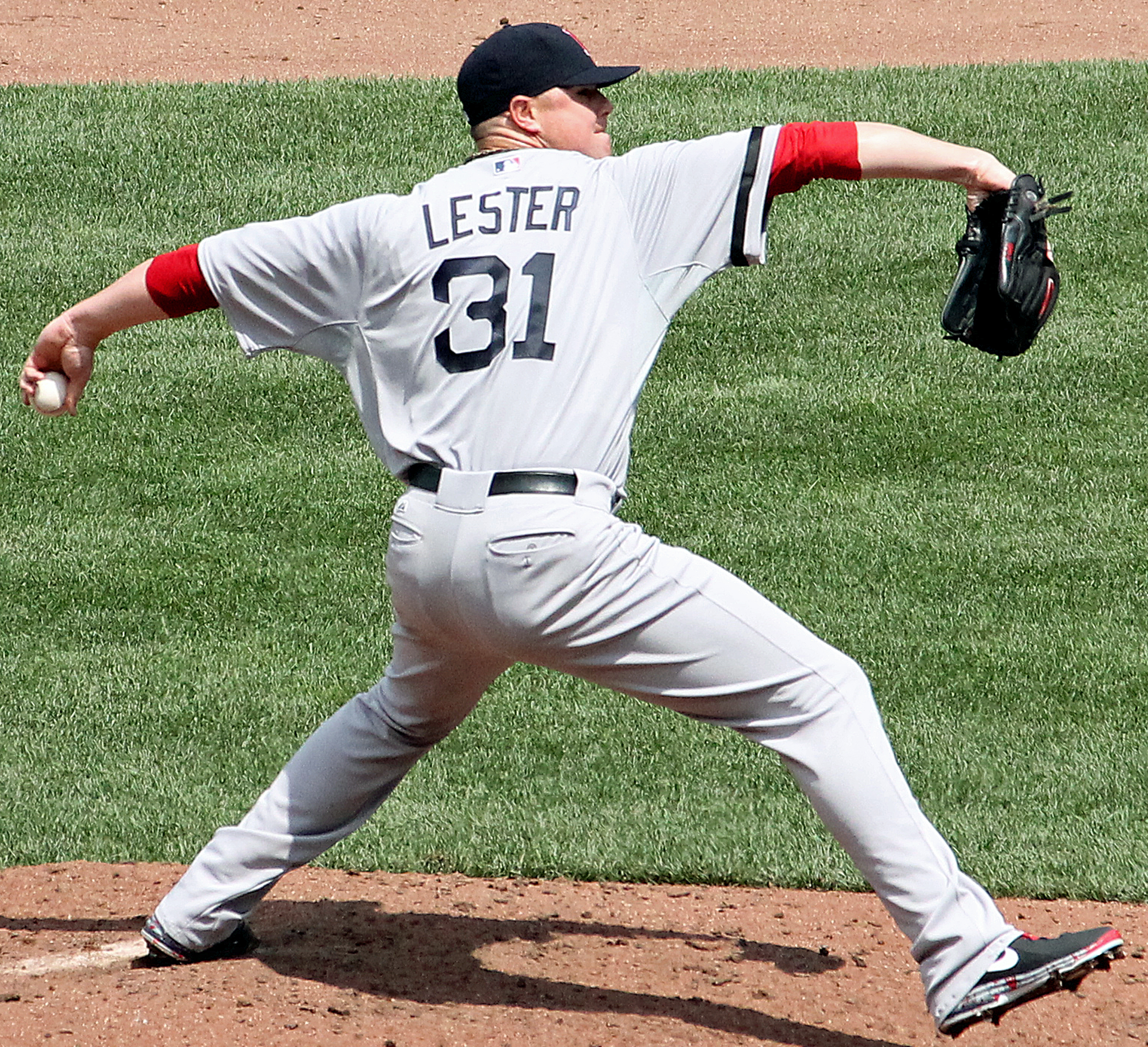
Jon Lester threw the most recent no-hitter for the Red Sox, in 2008.

There have been 18 no-hitters thrown in Red Sox history, most recently by Jon Lester on May 19, 2008, against the Kansas City Royals. The franchise's first no-hitter is also the only perfect game in franchise history so far, thrown by Cy Young on May 5, 1904, against the Philadelphia Athletics.

The first Red Sox rookie to throw a no-hitter was Clay Buchholz, doing so against the Baltimore Orioles on September 1, 2007, in his second Major League start.

==== Hitting for the cycle ====
Red Sox batters have hit for the cycle 23 times in franchise history, tied for second most (with the San Francisco Giants) for all franchises behind the Pittsburgh Pirates, who have hit 24. On October 8, 2018, Brock Holt became the first player in MLB history to hit for the cycle in the postseason, doing so in a 16–1 win over the New York Yankees in Game 3 of the 2018 American League Division Series.

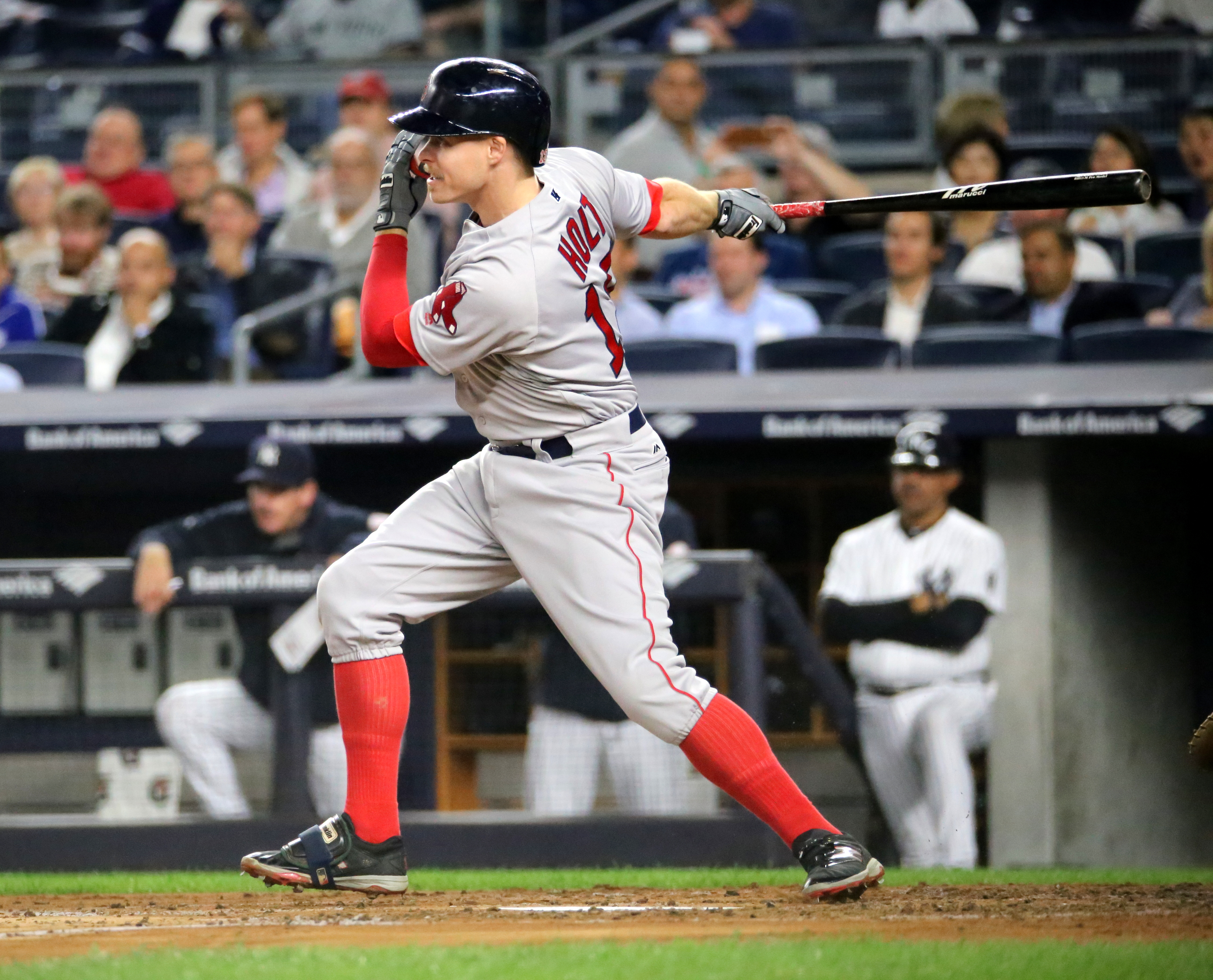
Brock Holt hit for the cycle twice for the Red Sox, including the first in Postseason history.

The following is a list of Boston Red Sox players who have hit for the cycle:

1. Buck Freeman — June 21, 1903
2. Patsy Dougherty — July 29, 1903
3. Tris Speaker — June 9, 1912
4. Roy Carlyle — July 21, 1925
5. Moose Solters — August 19, 1934
6. Joe Cronin — August 2, 1940 (Cronin's second career cycle, he first hit one for the Washington Senators in 1929)
7. Leon Culberson — July 3, 1943 (natural cycle)
8. Bobby Doerr — May 17, 1944
9. Bob Johnson — July 6, 1944
10. Ted Williams — July 21, 1946
11. Bobby Doerr (2) — May 13, 1947
12. Lou Clinton — July 13, 1962
13. Carl Yastrzemski — May 14, 1965
14. Bob Watson — September 15, 1979 (natural cycle; Watson's second career cycle, he first hit one for the Houston Astros in 1977)
15. Fred Lynn — May 13, 1980
16. Dwight Evans — June 28, 1984
17. Rich Gedman — September 18, 1985
18. Mike Greenwell — September 14, 1988
19. Scott Cooper — April 12, 1994
20. John Valentin — June 6, 1996
21. Brock Holt — June 16, 2015
22. Mookie Betts — August 9, 2018
23. Brock Holt (2) — October 8, 2018 (Game 3 of the American League Division Series, first cycle in MLB Postseason history)

== Minor league affiliations ==
Since the 2021 season, Boston's farm system has consisted of six minor league affiliates, fielding seven minor league teams (the Red Sox have two teams in the Dominican Summer League).

Level	Team	League	Location	Distance to Fenway Park
Triple-A	Worcester Red Sox	International League	Worcester, Massachusetts	45 miles (72 km)
Double-A	Portland Sea Dogs	Eastern League	Portland, Maine	107 miles (172 km)
High-A	Greenville Drive	South Atlantic League	Greenville, South Carolina	932 miles (1,500 km)
Single-A	Salem RidgeYaks	Carolina League	Salem, Virginia	677 miles (1,090 km)
Rookie	FCL Red Sox	Florida Complex League	Fort Myers, Florida	1,247 miles (2,007 km)
Rookie	DSL Red Sox Blue	Dominican Summer League	Santo Domingo, Dominican Republic	1,650 miles (2,660 km)
Rookie	DSL Red Sox Red	Dominican Summer League	Santo Domingo, Dominican Republic	1,650 miles (2,660 km)

== See also ==
General information

- History of the Boston Red Sox
- Red Sox Nation
- Tony Conigliaro Award
- The Jimmy Fund
- Sports in Massachusetts
- Sports in Boston

Lists

- Boston Red Sox all-time roster
- List of Boston Red Sox award winners
- List of Boston Red Sox coaches
- List of Boston Red Sox managers
- List of Boston Red Sox seasons
- List of Boston Red Sox team records
- List of Major League Baseball franchise postseason streaks

Media

- Game 6 – a film covering the team's ultimately unsuccessful 1986 World Series championship run
- Red Sox Rule – a 2008 book written by Michael Holley

== Notes ==
Awards and achievements
Preceded by None (first)	World Series champions Boston Americans; 1903	Succeeded by New York Giants; 1905
Preceded by Philadelphia Athletics; 1911	World Series champions Boston Red Sox; 1912	Succeeded by Philadelphia Athletics; 1913
Preceded by Boston Braves; 1914	World Series champions 1915–1916	Succeeded by Chicago White Sox; 1917
Preceded by Chicago White Sox; 1917	World Series champions 1918	Succeeded by Cincinnati Reds; 1919
Preceded by Florida Marlins; 2003	World Series champions 2004	Succeeded by Chicago White Sox; 2005
Preceded by St. Louis Cardinals; 2006	World Series champions 2007	Succeeded by Philadelphia Phillies; 2008
Preceded by San Francisco Giants; 2012	World Series champions 2013	Succeeded by San Francisco Giants; 2014
Preceded by Houston Astros; 2017	World Series champions 2018	Succeeded by Washington Nationals; 2019
Preceded by Philadelphia Athletics; 1902	American League champions 1903–1904	Succeeded by Philadelphia Athletics; 1905
Preceded by Philadelphia Athletics; 1910–1911	American League champions 1912	Succeeded by Philadelphia Athletics; 1913–1914
Preceded by Philadelphia Athletics; 1913–1914	American League champions 1915–1916	Succeeded by Chicago White Sox; 1917
Preceded by Chicago White Sox; 1917	American League champions 1918	Succeeded by Chicago White Sox; 1919
Preceded by Detroit Tigers; 1945	American League champions 1946	Succeeded by New York Yankees; 1947
Preceded by Baltimore Orioles; 1966	American League champions 1967	Succeeded by Detroit Tigers; 1968
Preceded by Oakland Athletics; 1972–1974	American League champions 1975	Succeeded by New York Yankees; 1976–1978
Preceded by Kansas City Royals; 1985	American League champions 1986	Succeeded by Minnesota Twins; 1987
Preceded by New York Yankees; 2003	American League champions 2004	Succeeded by Chicago White Sox; 2005
Preceded by Detroit Tigers; 2006	American League champions 2007	Succeeded by Tampa Bay Rays; 2008
Preceded by Detroit Tigers; 2012	American League champions 2013	Succeeded by Kansas City Royals; 2014
Preceded by Houston Astros; 2017	American League champions 2018	Succeeded by Houston Astros; 2019
