= 1903 Boston Americans season =

Major League Baseball season

1903 Boston Americans
- World Series champions American League champions
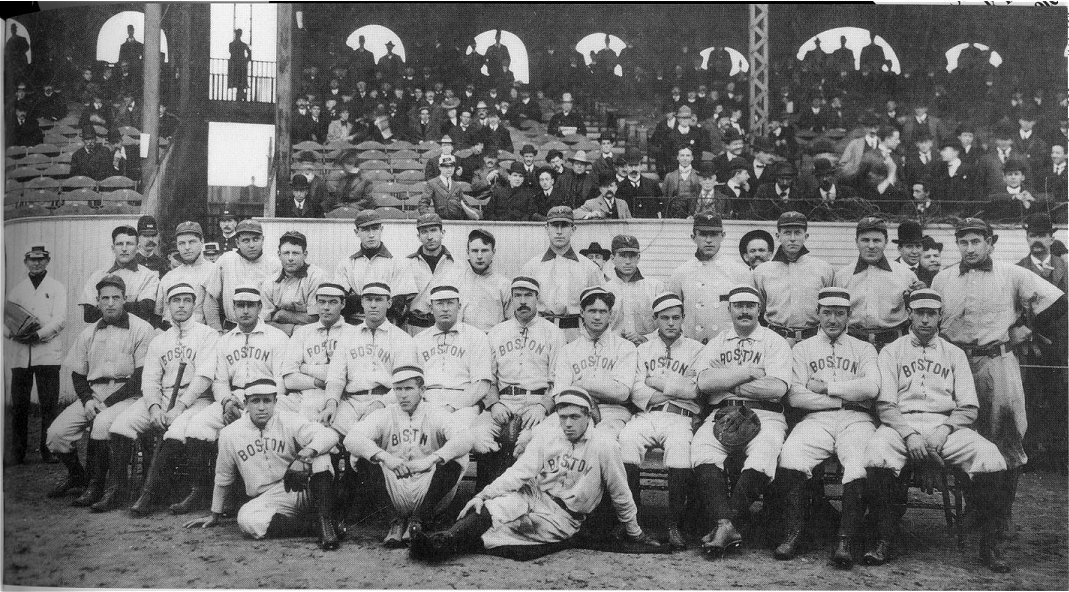
- Boston Americans (sitting) and Pittsburgh Pirates (standing) at the 1903 World Series
- League: American League
- Ballpark: Huntington Avenue Grounds
- City: Boston, Massachusetts
- Record: 91–47 (.659)
- League place: 1st
- Owners: Henry Killilea
- Managers: Jimmy Collins
- Stats: ESPN.com; Baseball Reference

The 1903 Boston Americans season was the third season for the professional baseball franchise that later became known as the Boston Red Sox. The Americans finished first in the American League (AL) with a record of 91 wins and 47 losses, 14 1/2 games ahead of the Philadelphia Athletics. Boston went on to participate in the first World Series held between the AL and National League (NL) champions. The Americans won the 1903 World Series in eight games over the Pittsburgh Pirates. The team was managed by Jimmy Collins and played its home games at Huntington Avenue Grounds.

== Offseason and spring training ==
=== Transactions ===
- October 6, 1902: It is reported that George Stone will play for the Boston Americans.
- October 28, 1902: John McGraw, manager of the New York Giants, announces that Jack Warner of the Boston Americans had signed to play for the Giants. This decision came after weeks of speculation as to the future of Jack Warner. In an interview printed on September 25, 1902, Jimmy Collins stated that he had signed Warner to a two-year contract with the Americans the previous month. On October 13, 1902, Jimmy Collins had gone to New York after hearing reports that Warner had jumped to the New York Giants.
- March 18, 1903: Catcher Charles "Duke" Farrell announces that he has accepted an offer to play for the Boston Americans.

Prior to the regular season, the team held spring training in Macon, Georgia. Cy Young was a coach for the Mercer University baseball team, also based in Macon.

The Boston Americans played an exhibition game against Mercer University (with Cy Young pitching for Mercer) on March 23; the outcome being a 13─2 victory for Boston.

== Regular season overview ==
- May 12: After a slow start to the season, the team has a winning record for the first time, at 10–9, with a 10–5 win over the Cleveland Naps at League Park in Cleveland.
- June 1: With a 20–15 record, Boston moves into first place in the AL, a half-game ahead of the St. Louis Browns.
- June 9: The team's longest winning streak of the season, 11 games between May 28 and June 8, comes to an end with a loss to the visiting Detroit Tigers.
- June 16: With a 28–18 record, Boston falls a game behind Philadelphia in the AL standings.
- June 21: Buck Freeman is the first player in franchise history to hit for the cycle, in a road win at Cleveland.
- June 23: With a 33–20 record, Boston regains the AL lead, which they will not relinquish through the end of the season.
- June 30: Nick Altrock starts and pitches eight innings in a 10–3 road loss to the Chicago White Sox; these are the only innings in the entire season not pitched by members of the five-man rotation, led by Cy Young.
- July 29: Patsy Dougherty hits for the cycle against the visiting New York Highlanders. It is also Boston's highest scoring game of the year, a 15–14 loss.
- September 28: The season ends with a home doubleheader against the Browns, with Boston winning both games; 8–7 and 6–0.

The team's longest losing streak was three games, which occurred twice; April 20–23 and September 22–23. The team's longest game was 12 innings, which occurred three times.

=== Transactions ===
- May 1, 1903: The Boston Americans acquire University of Illinois Athlete Jake Stahl, who agrees to join the team after receiving his diploma in June. Henry Killilea had met with Stahl on April 27, 1903, promising him $500 a month to play catcher for the Boston Americans. Stahl would make his debut with the Americans on June 6.
- July 2: Pitcher Nick Altrock is released by the Boston Americans, and is immediately signed by the Chicago White Sox.

=== Statistical leaders ===
The offense was led by Buck Freeman, who hit 13 home runs and had 104 RBIs, and Patsy Dougherty with a .331 batting average. It was Freeman's third consecutive season with at least 100 RBIs. The pitching staff was led by Cy Young, who made 40 appearances (35 starts) and pitched 34 complete games with a 28–9 record and 2.08 ERA, while striking out 176 in 341 2/3 innings. The team had two other 20-game winners; Bill Dinneen (21–13) and Tom Hughes (20–7).

== Season log ==
Boston Win	Boston Loss	Tie Game

1903 Boston Americans Season Log: 91─47─3
April: 4─6

#	Date	Opponent	Score	Win	Loss	Record	Box Score
1	April 20 (1)	Philadelphia	4─9	Winter (1–0)	Waddell (0–1)	1─0	
2	April 20 (2)	Philadelphia	10─7	Bender (1─0)	Hughes (0─1)	1─1	
3	April 22	@Philadelphia	1─6	Waddell (1─1)	Dinneen (0─1)	1─2	
4	April 23	@Philadelphia	4─7	Henley (1─0)	Winter (1–0)	1─3	
5	April 24	@Philadelphia	1─2	Young (1─0)	Plank (0─1)	2─3	
6	April 25	@Philadelphia	0─4	Hughes (1─1)	Waddell (1–2)	3─3	
7	April 27	@Washington	3─6	Orth (2─0)	Dinneen (0─2)	3─4	
8	April 28	@Washington	11─4	Young (2─0)	Lee (0─2)	4─4	
9	April 29	@Washington	5─9	Patten (2─0)	Gibson (0─1)	4─5	
10	April 30	Philadelphia	12─2	Plank (1─1)	Winter (1─2)	4─6	

May: 15─9

#	Date	Opponent	Score	Win	Loss	Record	Box Score
11	May 1	Philadelphia	2─4	Dinneen (1─2)	Bender (2─1)	5─6	
12	May 2	Philadelphia	3─0	Plank (2─1)	Young (2─1)	5─7	
13	May 4	Washington	4─6	Hughes (2─1)	Patten (2─1)	6─7	
14	May 6	Washington	3─6	Young (3─1)	Lee (0─3)	7─7	
15	May 7	New York	2─6	Dinneen (2─2)	Wiltse (0─1)	8─7	
16	May 8	New York	6─1	Chesbro (4─1)	Winter (1─3)	8─8	
17	May 9	New York	5─12	Young (4─1)	Tannehill (2─2)	9─8	
18	May 11	@Cleveland	5─6	Bernhard (3─1)	Dinneen (2─3)	9─9	
19	May 12	@Cleveland	10─5	Dinneen (3─3)	Wright (0─2)	10─9	
20	May 13	@Cleveland	1─2	Joss (3─2)	Young (4─2)	10─10	
21	May 14	@Cleveland	10─4	Gibson (1─1)	Moore (1─3)	11─10	
22	May 15	@Detroit	6─8	Kitson (1─3)	Hughes (2─2)	11─11	
23	May 16	@Detroit	9─6	Young (5─2)	Jones (0─1)	12─11	
24	May 18	@Detroit	1─12	Donovan (5─1)	Gibson (1─2)	12─12	
25	May 19	@Detroit	3─2	Dinneen (4─3)	Mullin (4─3)	13─12	
26	May 20	@St. Louis	3─4	Sudhoff (4─1)	Young (5─3)	13─13	
27	May 22	@St. Louis	4─6	Siever (2─3)	Winter (1─4)	13─14	
28	May 23	@Chicago	4─1	Dinneen (5─3)	White (3─3)	14─14	
29	May 24	@Chicago	7─0	Young (6─3)	Flaherty (4─5)	15─14	
30	May 26	@Chicago	2─3	Dunkle (2─1)	Hughes (2─3)	15─15	
31	May 28	Washington	4─5	Winter (2─4)	Wilson (1─5)	16─15	
32	May 29	Washington	2─7	Dinneen (6─3)	Lee (1─6)	17─15	
33	May 30 (1)	Washington	2─3	Gibson (2─2)	Orth (3─4)	18─15	
34	May 30 (2)	Washington	0─4	Young (7─3)	Patten (5─4)	19─15	

June: 19─7

#	Date	Opponent	Score	Win	Loss	Record	Box Score
35	June 1	@New York	8─2	Hughes (3─3)	Chesbro (6─5)	20─15	
36	June 2	@New York	9─0	Dinneen (7─3)	Tannehill (6─4)	21─15	
37	June 3	@New York	9─3	Young (8─3)	Griffith (1─5)	22─15	
38	June 4	Chicago	3─10	Winter (3─4)	Dunkle (2─2)	23─15	
39	June 5	Chicago	8─10	Gibson (3─2)	Patterson (6─3)	24─15	
40	June 6	Chicago	2─10	Dinneen (8─3)	Flaherty (5─7)	25─15	
41	June 8	Detroit	1─6	Young (9─3)	Deering (2─2)	26─15	
42	June 9	Detroit	7─3	Mullin (6─5)	Young (9─4)	26─16	
43	June 10	Detroit	5─0	Donovan (7─3)	Dinneen (8─4)	26─17	
44	June 11	St. Louis	0─2	Hughes (4─3)	Sudhoff (7─2)	27─17	
45	June 13	St. Louis	0─7	Young (10─4)	Powell (3─7)	28─17	
46	June 16	Cleveland	7─0	Dorner (2─2)	Dinneen (8─5)	28─18	
47	June 17 (1)	Cleveland	3─1	Moore (7─3)	Gibson (3─3)	28─19	
48	June 17 (2)	Cleveland	1─6	Hughes (5─3)	Joss (6─7)	29─19	
49	June 18	@Cleveland	4─5	Bernhard (8─3)	Winter (3─5)	29─20	
50	June 19	@Cleveland	5─3	Dinneen (9─5)	Wright (3─5)	30─20	
51	June 20	@Cleveland	5─4	Gibson (4─3)	Moore (7─4)	31─20	
52	June 21	@Cleveland	12─7	Hughes (6─3)	Dorner (2─3)	32─20	
53	June 23	@Detroit	1─0	Young (11─4)	Donovan (7─5)	33─20	
54	June 24	@Detroit	1─2	Deering (3─3)	Dinneen (9─6)	33─21	
55	June 25	@St. Louis	7─1	Winter (4─5)	Siever (4─4)	34─21	
56	June 27	@St. Louis	6─0	Norwood (5─3)	Sudhoff (8─4)	35─21	
57	June 28 (1)	@St. Louis	1─0	Young (12─4)	Donahue (8─6)	36─21	
58	June 28 (2)	@St. Louis	3─0	Hughes (7─3)	Powell (5─8)	37─21	
59	June 29	@Chicago	7─2	Dinneen (10─6)	Dunkle (3─3)	38─21	
60	June 30	@Chicago	3─10	White (7─7)	Altrock (0─1)	38─22	

July: 16─9─1

#	Date	Opponent	Score	Win	Loss	Record	Box Score
61	July 1	@Chicago	1─0	Young (13─4)	Flaherty (8─9)	39─22	
62	July 2	@Chicago	2─6	Owen (3─3)	Gibson (5─4)	39─23	
63	July 4 (1)	St. Louis	1─4	Hughes (8─3)	Siever (4─5)	40─23	
64	July 4 (2)	St. Louis	0─2	Dinneen (11─6)	Sudhoff (8─6)	41─23	
65	July 6	St. Louis	6─8	Young (14─4)	Terry (0─1)	42─23	
66	July 7	St. Louis	3─2	Sudhoff (9─6)	Gibson (5─5)	42─24	
67	July 8	Chicago	1─6	Winter (5─5)	Altrock (0─2)	43─24	
68	July 9	Chicago	3─5	Dinneen (12─6)	Flaherty (8─11)	44─24	
69	July 10	Chicago	8─4	White (9─8)	Hughes (8─4)	44─25	
70	July 11	Chicago	5─8	Young (15─4)	Dunkle (3─4)	45─25	
71	July 14	Cleveland	4─3	Moore (10─6)	Dinneen (12─7)	45─26	
72	July 15 (1)	Cleveland	3─4	Young (16─4)	Joss (9─10)	46─26	
73	July 15 (2)	Cleveland	4─2	Bernhard (13─4)	Winter (5─6)	46─27	
74	July 16	Cleveland	4─11	Hughes (9─4)	Dorner (3─5)	47─27	
75	July 17	Detroit	0─1	Gibson (6─5)	Donovan (12─6)	48─27	
76	July 18	Detroit	3─5	Young (17─4)	Mullin (11─9)	49─27	
77	July 20	Detroit	3─2	Kisinger (2─1)	Winter (5─7)	49─28	
78	July 23 (1)	@New York	6─1	Young (18─4)	Chesbro (11─12)	50─28	
79	July 23 (2)	@New York	2─4	Deering (4─4)	Hughes (9─5)	50─29	
80	July 24	@Yankees	8─2	Gibson (7─5)	Griffith (8─2)	51─29	
81	July 25	@New York	7─5	Winter (6─7)	Tannehill (10─9)	52─29	
82	July 27	New York	0─5	Dinneen (13─7)	Deering (4─5)	53─29	
83	July 28	New York	0─3	Hughes (10─5)	Griffith (8─9)	54─29	
84	July 29	New York	15─14	Howell (4─1)	Young (18─5)	54─30	
85	July 30	New York	12─1	Deering (5─5)	Gibson (7─6)	54─31	
86	July 31	@Washington	4─4	─	─	54─31─1	

August: 18─9─1

#	Date	Opponent	Score	Win	Loss	Record	Box Score
87	August 1 (1)	@Washington	0─1	Wilson (6─10)	Young (18─6)	54─32─1	
88	August 1 (2)	@Washington	5─1	Hughes (11─5)	Dunkle (5─7)	55─32─1	
89	August 3	@Washington	2─5	Orth (8─14)	Gibson (7─7)	55─33─1	
90	August 5	@Philadelphia	3─0	Dinneen (14─7)	Waddell (19─12)	56─33─1	
91	August 6	@Philadelphia	3─4	Bender (13─9)	Young (18─7)	56─34─1	
92	August 7	@Philadelphia	11─3	Hughes (12─5)	Plank (15─9)	57─34─1	
93	August 8	Philadelphia	6─11	Dinneen (15─7)	Henley (6─7)	58─34─1	
94	August 10	Philadelphia	2─7	Young (19─7)	Plank (15─10)	59─34─1	
95	August 11	Philadelphia	1─5	Hughes (13─5)	Waddell (19─13)	60─34─1	
96	August 13 (1)	@Detroit	3─1	Dinneen (16─7)	Mullin (12─11)	61─34─1	
97	August 13 (2)	@Detroit	1─10	Kitson (11─10)	Gibson (7─8)	61─35─1	
98	August 14	@Detroit	6─3	Young (20─7)	Donovan (15─9)	62─35─1	
99	August 15	@Detroit	6─3	Hughes (14─5)	Skopec (0─1)	63─35─1	
100	August 17	@Cleveland	3─9	Joss (15─13)	Dinneen (16─8)	63─36─1	
101	August 18	@Cleveland	10─2	Young (21─7)	Donahue (10─10)	64─36─1	
102	August 19	@Chicago	4─3	Dinneen (17─8)	White (15─12)	65─36─1	
103	August 20	@Chicago	5─9	Altrock (2─3)	Hughes (14─6)	65─37─1	
104	August 21	@Chicago	11─3	Young (22─7)	Patterson (11─10)	66─37─1	
105	August 22	@St. Louis	1─2	Pelty (1─0)	Dinneen (17─9)	66─38─1	
106	August 23 (1)	@St. Louis	5─3	Hughes (15─6)	Siever (8─12)	67─38─1	
107	August 23 (2)	@St. Louis	4─2	Young (23─7)	Sudhoff (19─10)	68─38─1	
108	August 24	@St. Louis	1─5	Powell (10─16)	Gibson (7─9)	68─39─1	
109	August 26	@Philadelphia	3─0	Dinneen (18─9)	Bender (14─13)	69─39─1	
110	August 27	@Philadelphia	4─2	Hughes (16─6)	Plank (17─13)	70─39─1	
111	August 29 (1)	@Philadelphia	3─2	Young (24─7)	Lee (6─8)	71─39─1	
112	August 29 (2)	@Philadelphia	1─1	─	─	71─39─2	
113	August 31 (1)	@Washington	1─2	Patten (9─18)	Dinneen (18─10)	71─40─2	
114	August 31 (2)	@Washington	5─2	Gibson (8─9)	Dunkle (7─10)	72─40─2	

September: 19─7─1

#	Date	Opponent	Score	Win	Loss	Record	Box Score
115	September 1	@Washington	2─1	Hughes (17─6)	Orth (9─19)	73─40─2	
116	September 3	Philadelphia	5─6	Young (25─7)	Henley (7─8)	74─40─2	
117	September 5	Philadelphia	1─12	Dinneen (19─10)	Coakley (0─3)	75─40─2	
118	September 7 (1)	@New York	4─0	Hughes (18─6)	Chesbro (17─15)	76─40─2	
119	September 7 (2)	@New York	0─5	Tannehill (15─12)	Young (25─8)	76─41─2	
120	September 8	@New York	0─1	Deering (6─6)	Dinneen (19─11)	76─42─2	
121	September 9 (1)	Washington	4─9	Hughes (19─6)	Patten (10─19)	77─42─2	
122	September 9 (2)	Washington	2─3	Winter (7─7)	Lee (6─10)	78─42─2	
123	September 10	Washington	0─3	Young (26─8)	Orth (9─21)	79─42─2	
124	September 11	Washington	1─2	Gibson (9─9)	Dunkle (7─12)	80─42─2	
125	September 12	New York	1─10	Hughes (20─6)	Deering (6─7)	81─42─2	
126	September 14	New York	4─2	Chesbro (19─15)	Dinneen (19─12)	81─43─2	
127	September 15	New York	3─12	Young (27─8)	Tannehill (15─14)	82─43─2	
128	September 16	Cleveland	7─14	Gibson (10─9)	Donahue (14─14)	83─43─2	
129	September 17	Cleveland	3─14	Winter (8─7)	Rhoads (6─10)	84─43─2	
130	September 18	Cleveland	6─7	Dinneen (20─12)	Killian (3─3)	85─43─2	
131	September 19	Chicago	3─13	Young (28─8)	Flaherty (11─24)	86─43─2	
132	September 21	Chicago	3─4	Gibson (11─9)	Patterson (14─14)	87─43─2	
133	September 22	Chicago	7─0	Altrock (3─3)	Hughes (20─7)	87─44─2	
134	September 23 (1)	Detroit	5─4	Donovan (17─16)	Dinneen (20─13)	87─45─2	
135	September 23 (2)	Detroit	8─2	Mullin (18─15)	Winter (8─8)	87─46─2	
136	September 24	Detroit	2─8	Gibson (12─9)	Kisinger (7─9)	88─46─2	
137	September 25	Detroit	6─6	─	─	88─46─3	
138	September 26 (1)	St. Louis	6─2	Siever (13─14)	Young (28─9)	88─47─3	
139	September 26 (2)	St. Louis	2─8	Winter (9─8)	Wright (6─15)	89─47─3	
140	September 28 (1)	St. Louis	7─8	Gibson (13─9)	Powell (15─19)	90─47─3	
141	September 28 (2)	St. Louis	0─6	Dinneen (21─13)	Sudhoff (21─15)	91─47─3	

== Statistics ==
American League
Team	W	L	Pct.	GB	Home	Road
Boston Americans	91	47	.659	—	49‍–‍20	42‍–‍27
Philadelphia Athletics	75	60	.556	14½	44‍–‍21	31‍–‍39
Cleveland Naps	77	63	.550	15	49‍–‍25	28‍–‍38
New York Highlanders	72	62	.537	17	41‍–‍26	31‍–‍36
Detroit Tigers	65	71	.478	25	37‍–‍28	28‍–‍43
St. Louis Browns	65	74	.468	26½	38‍–‍32	27‍–‍42
Chicago White Stockings	60	77	.438	30½	41‍–‍28	19‍–‍49
Washington Senators	43	94	.314	47½	29‍–‍40	14‍–‍54

The team had three games end in a tie; July 31 at Washington, August 29 at Washington, and September 25 vs. Detroit. Tie games are not counted in league standings, but player statistics during tie games are counted.

=== Record vs. opponents ===
1903 American League record Sources:
Team	BOS	CWS	CLE	DET	NYH	PHA	SLB	WSH
Boston	—	14–6	12–8	10–9–1	13–7	13–6	14–6	15–5–2
Chicago	6–14	—	10–10	10–9	7–11–1	6–14	9–11	12–8
Cleveland	8–12	10–10	—	9–11	14–6	9–11	11–9	16–4
Detroit	9–10–1	9–10	11–9	—	10–9	11–9	6–14	9–10
New York	7–13	11–7–1	6–14	9–10	—	10–8–1	15–5	14–5
Philadelphia	6–13	14–6	11–9	9–11	8–10–1	—	11–8	16–3–1
St. Louis	6–14	11–9	9–11	14–6	5–15	8–11	—	12–8
Washington	5–15–2	8–12	4–16	10–9	5–14	3–16–1	8–12	—

=== Opening Day lineup ===
Patsy Dougherty	LF
Jimmy Collins	3B
Chick Stahl	CF
Buck Freeman	RF
Freddy Parent	SS
Candy LaChance	1B
Hobe Ferris	2B
Duke Farrell	C
George Winter	P

=== Roster ===
1903 Boston Americans
Roster
Pitchers: Nick Altrock; Bill Dinneen; Norwood Gibson; Tom Hughes; George Winter; Cy Young	Catchers: Lou Criger; Duke Farrell; Aleck Smith; Jake Stahl; Infielders: Jimmy Collins; Hobe Ferris; Harry Gleason; Candy LaChance; Freddy Parent	Outfielders: Patsy Dougherty; Buck Freeman; Jack O'Brien; Chick Stahl; Other batters: George Stone	Manager: Jimmy Collins

=== Red Sox debuts ===
Name	Position	Date	Game	Source
Duke Farrell	Catcher	4/20/1903	Vs. Philadelphia	
George Stone	Pinch Hitter	4/20/1903	Vs. Philadelphia	
Jack O'Brien	Pinch Hitter	4/23/1903	@ Philadelphia	
Norwood Gibson	Pitcher	4/29/1903	@ Washington	
Aleck Smith	Catcher	5/12/1903	@ Cleveland	
Jake Stahl	Catcher	6/6/1903	Vs. Chicago	

== Player stats ==
=== Batting ===
Note: Pos = Position; G = Games Played; AB = At Bats; R = Runs; H = Hits; 2B = Doubles; 3B = Triples; HR = Home Runs; RBI = Runs Batted In; AVG = Batting Average; OPB = On Base Percentage; SLG = Slugging Percentage.

==== Starters by position ====
Pos	Player	G	AB	R	H	2B	3B	HR	RBI	AVG	OBP	SLG	Reference
C	Lou Criger	96	316	41	61	7	10	3	31	.193	.259	.307	
1B	Candy LaChance	141	523	60	134	22	6	1	53	.256	.302	.327	
2B	Hobe Ferris	141	524	69	132	19	7	9	69	.252	.285	.366	
SS	Freddy Parent	139	560	83	170	31	17	4	80	.304	.323	.441	
3B	Jimmy Collins	130	540	88	160	33	17	5	71	.295	.327	.446	
OF	Buck Freeman	141	566	74	163	39	20	13	106	.288	.331	.496	
OF	Patsy Dougherty	139	589	107	195	19	12	4	59	.331	.377	.424	
OF	Chick Stahl	77	298	60	82	12	6	2	43	.275	.341	.376	

==== Other batters ====
Note: G = Games Played; AB = At Bats; R = Runs; H = Hits; 2B = Doubles; 3B = Triples; HR = Home Runs; RBI = Runs Batted In; AVG = Batting Average; OPB = On Base Percentage; SLG = Slugging Percentage.

Player	G	AB	R	H	2B	3B	HR	RBI	AVG	OBP	SLG	Reference
Jack O'Brien	96	339	44	71	14	4	3	38	.209	.262	.301	
Jake Stahl	40	92	14	22	3	5	2	8	.239	.278	.446	
Duke Farrell	17	52	5	21	5	1	0	8	.404	.475	.538	
Aleck Smith	11	33	4	10	2	0	0	4	.303	.303	.333	
Harry Gleason	6	13	3	2	1	0	0	2	.154	.154	.231	
George Stone	2	2	0	0	0	0	0	0	.000	.000	.000	

==== Pitchers ====
Note: G = Games Played; AB = At Bats; R = Runs; H = Hits; 2B = Doubles; 3B = Triples; HR = Home Runs; RBI = Runs Batted In; AVG. = Batting Average; OPB = On Base Percentage; SLG = Slugging Percentage.

Player	G	AB	R	H	2B	3B	HR	RBI	AVG	OBP	SLG	Reference
Cy Young	41	137	21	44	6	3	1	14	.321	.331	.431	
Bill Dinneen	37	107	6	17	2	1	0	8	.159	.237	.196	
Tom Hughes	33	92	14	26	4	2	1	13	.283	.313	.402	
Norwood Gibson	25	64	8	17	2	2	0	4	.266	.319	.359	
George Winter	24	66	7	7	2	0	0	1	.106	.119	.136	
Nick Altrock	1	3	0	2	0	0	0	0	.667	.750	.667	

=== Pitching ===
Note: G=Games Played; GS=Games Started; IP=Innings Pitched; H=Hits; BB=Walks; R=Runs; ER=Earned Runs; SO=Strikeouts; W=Wins; L=Losses; SV=Saves; ERA=Earned Run Average

==== Starting pitchers ====
Player	G	GS	IP	H	BB	R	ER	SO	W	L	ERA	Reference
Cy Young	40	35	341 2/3	294	37	115	79	176	28	9	2.08	
Bill Dinneen	37	34	299	255	66	98	75	148	21	13	2.26	
Tom Hughes	33	31	244 2/3	232	60	95	70	112	20	7	2.57	
Norwood Gibson	24	21	183 1/3	166	65	95	65	76	13	9	3.19	
George Winter	24	19	178 1/3	182	37	92	61	64	9	8	3.08	
Nick Altrock	1	1	8	13	4	10	8	3	0	1	9.00	

=== League leaders ===
==== Hitting ====
===== Buck Freeman =====
- MLB Home Run Leader (13).
- MLB RBI Leader (104).
- MLB Games Played Leader (141).

===== Candy LaChance =====
- MLB Games Played Leader (141).

==== Pitching ====
===== Cy Young =====
- MLB Shutout Leader (7).
- AL Wins Leader (28).
- AL Complete Game Leader (34).

== World Series ==
Boston had an 11-game winning streak from May 28 through June 8, to put themselves in the AL lead. While they briefly fell into second place in mid-June, behind Philadelphia, Boston then won 9-of-10 to recapture the lead, which they held through the end of the season. The Americans met the Pittsburgh Pirates in the first modern World Series, an agreement between the AL and the NL as a post-season tournament. The "Amerks" won the best-of-nine series in eight games; after falling behind, 3–1, they won four games in a row, clinching the championship at their home field, the Huntington Avenue Grounds, in Boston.

The first championship of what is now 9 for the long-running club, the series would be immortalized in the 2004 remake of the team's fight song Tessie by The Dropkick Murphys, honoring the victory over the Pirates in Game 5, helped in part by that song which was adopted as an anthem by a group of team supporters, the Royal Rooters, under saloon owner Michael T. McGreevy.

=== Summary ===
Boston won the series, 5–3.

Game	Date	Score	Location	Time	Attendance
1	October 1	Pittsburgh Pirates – 7, Boston Americans – 3	Huntington Avenue Grounds	1:55	16,242
2	October 2	Pittsburgh Pirates – 0, Boston Americans – 3	Huntington Avenue Grounds	1:47	9,415
3	October 3	Pittsburgh Pirates – 4, Boston Americans – 2	Huntington Avenue Grounds	1:50	18,801
4	October 6	Boston Americans – 4, Pittsburgh Pirates – 5	Exposition Park	1:30	7,600
5	October 7	Boston Americans – 11, Pittsburgh Pirates – 2	Exposition Park	2:00	12,322
6	October 8	Boston Americans – 6, Pittsburgh Pirates – 3	Exposition Park	2:02	11,556
7	October 10	Boston Americans – 7, Pittsburgh Pirates – 3	Exposition Park	1:45	17,038
8	October 13	Pittsburgh Pirates – 0, Boston Americans – 3	Huntington Avenue Grounds	1:35	7,455

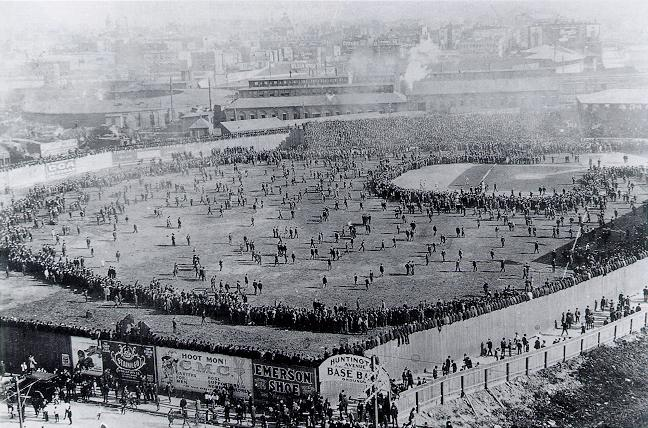
Huntington Avenue Grounds before the first modern World Series game, Pittsburgh at Boston

== See also ==
- List of Boston Red Sox team records
