= 1903 St. Louis Browns season =

Major League Baseball season

1903 St. Louis Browns
- League: American League
- Ballpark: Sportsman's Park
- City: St. Louis, Missouri
- Record: 65–74 (.468)
- League place: 6th
- Owners: Robert Hedges
- Managers: Jimmy McAleer

The 1903 St. Louis Browns season was a season in American baseball. The team finished sixth in the American League with a record of 65 wins and 74 losses, 26½ games behind the Boston Americans.

== Regular season ==
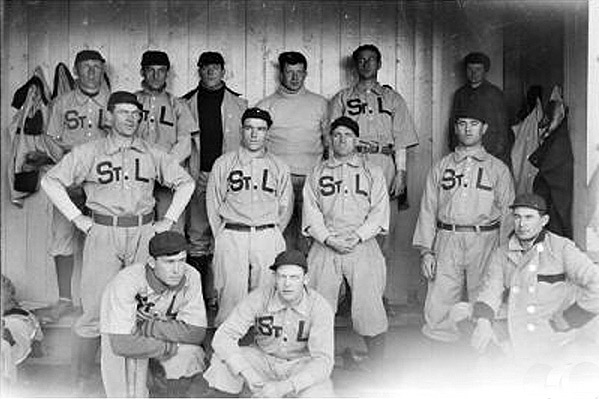
The 1903 St. Louis Browns

=== Season standings ===
American League
Team	W	L	Pct.	GB	Home	Road
Boston Americans	91	47	.659	—	49‍–‍20	42‍–‍27
Philadelphia Athletics	75	60	.556	14½	44‍–‍21	31‍–‍39
Cleveland Naps	77	63	.550	15	49‍–‍25	28‍–‍38
New York Highlanders	72	62	.537	17	41‍–‍26	31‍–‍36
Detroit Tigers	65	71	.478	25	37‍–‍28	28‍–‍43
St. Louis Browns	65	74	.468	26½	38‍–‍32	27‍–‍42
Chicago White Stockings	60	77	.438	30½	41‍–‍28	19‍–‍49
Washington Senators	43	94	.314	47½	29‍–‍40	14‍–‍54

=== Record vs. opponents ===
1903 American League record Sources:
Team	BOS	CWS	CLE	DET	NYH	PHA	SLB	WSH
Boston	—	14–6	12–8	10–9–1	13–7	13–6	14–6	15–5–2
Chicago	6–14	—	10–10	10–9	7–11–1	6–14	9–11	12–8
Cleveland	8–12	10–10	—	9–11	14–6	9–11	11–9	16–4
Detroit	9–10–1	9–10	11–9	—	10–9	11–9	6–14	9–10
New York	7–13	11–7–1	6–14	9–10	—	10–8–1	15–5	14–5
Philadelphia	6–13	14–6	11–9	9–11	8–10–1	—	11–8	16–3–1
St. Louis	6–14	11–9	9–11	14–6	5–15	8–11	—	12–8
Washington	5–15–2	8–12	4–16	10–9	5–14	3–16–1	8–12	—

=== Roster ===
1903 St. Louis Browns
Roster
Pitchers: Red Donahue; Roy Evans; Cy Morgan; Barney Pelty; Jack Powell; Bill Reidy; Ed Siever; Willie Sudhoff; John Terry; Gene Wright	Catchers: Mike Kahoe; Owen Shannon; Joe Sugden; Infielders: John Anderson; Benny Bowcock; Bill Friel; Claude Gouzzie; Hunter Hill; Barry McCormick; Dick Padden; Bobby Wallace	Outfielders: Jesse Burkett; Emmet Heidrick; Charlie Hemphill; Joe Martin; Pinky Swander	Manager: Jimmy McAleer

== Player stats ==
=== Batting ===
==== Starters by position ====
Note: Pos = Position; G = Games played; AB = At bats; H = Hits; Avg. = Batting average; HR = Home runs; RBI = Runs batted in

Pos	Player	G	AB	H	Avg.	HR	RBI
C	Mike Kahoe	77	244	46	.189	0	23
1B	John Anderson	138	550	156	.284	2	78
2B	Bill Friel	97	351	80	.228	0	25
SS	Bobby Wallace	135	511	136	.266	1	54
3B	Hunter Hill	86	317	77	.243	0	25
OF	Jesse Burkett	132	515	151	.293	3	40
OF	Emmet Heidrick	120	461	129	.280	1	42
OF	Charlie Hemphill	105	383	94	.245	3	29

==== Other batters ====
Note: G = Games played; AB = At bats; H = Hits; Avg. = Batting average; HR = Home runs; RBI = Runs batted in

Player	G	AB	H	Avg.	HR	RBI
Joe Sugden	79	241	51	.212	0	22
Barry McCormick	61	207	45	.217	1	16
Joe Martin	44	173	37	.214	0	7
Dick Padden	29	94	19	.202	0	6
Pinky Swander	14	51	14	.275	0	6
Benny Bowcock	14	50	16	.320	1	10
Owen Shannon	9	28	6	.214	0	3
Claude Gouzzie	1	1	0	.000	0	0

=== Pitching ===
==== Starting pitchers ====
Note: G = Games pitched; IP = Innings pitched; W = Wins; L = Losses; ERA = Earned run average; SO = Strikeouts

Player	G	IP	W	L	ERA	SO
Jack Powell	38	306.1	15	19	2.91	169
Willie Sudhoff	38	293.2	21	15	2.27	104
Ed Siever	31	254.0	13	14	2.48	90
Red Donahue	16	131.0	8	7	2.75	51
Gene Wright	8	61.0	3	5	3.69	37
Roy Evans	7	54.0	0	4	4.17	24
Barney Pelty	7	48.2	3	3	2.40	20
Bill Reidy	5	43.0	1	4	3.98	8

==== Other pitchers ====
Note: G = Games pitched; IP = Innings pitched; W = Wins; L = Losses; ERA = Earned run average; SO = Strikeouts

Player	G	IP	W	L	ERA	SO
John Terry	3	17.2	1	1	2.55	2
Cy Morgan	2	13.0	0	2	4.15	6
