= 1903 Cleveland Naps season =

1903 Cleveland Naps
- League: American League
- Ballpark: League Park
- City: Cleveland, Ohio
- Record: 77–63 (.550)
- League place: 3rd
- Owners: Charles Somers
- Managers: Bill Armour

The 1903 Cleveland Naps season was the third Major League Baseball season for the Cleveland American League team. After two seasons as the Bluebirds or Blues and also being called the Bronchos (or Broncos) in 1902, beginning with the 1903 season, the team was called the Naps in honor of star second baseman Nap Lajoie. The team finished third in the league with a record of 77–63, 15 games behind the Boston Americans.

== Offseason ==
- February 1903: Ollie Pickering was purchased from the Naps by the Philadelphia Athletics.

== Regular season ==
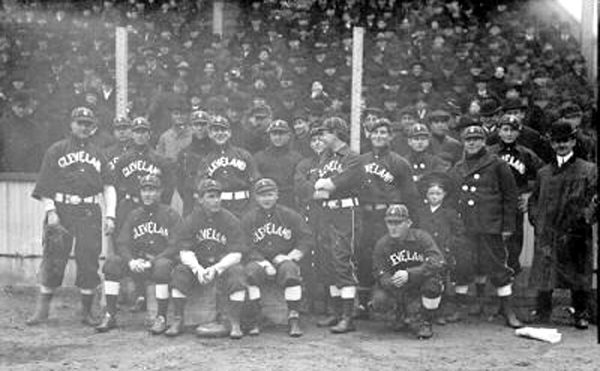
The 1903 Cleveland Naps

=== Season standings ===
American League
Team	W	L	Pct.	GB	Home	Road
Boston Americans	91	47	.659	—	49‍–‍20	42‍–‍27
Philadelphia Athletics	75	60	.556	14½	44‍–‍21	31‍–‍39
Cleveland Naps	77	63	.550	15	49‍–‍25	28‍–‍38
New York Highlanders	72	62	.537	17	41‍–‍26	31‍–‍36
Detroit Tigers	65	71	.478	25	37‍–‍28	28‍–‍43
St. Louis Browns	65	74	.468	26½	38‍–‍32	27‍–‍42
Chicago White Stockings	60	77	.438	30½	41‍–‍28	19‍–‍49
Washington Senators	43	94	.314	47½	29‍–‍40	14‍–‍54

=== Record vs. opponents ===
1903 American League record Sources:
Team	BOS	CWS	CLE	DET	NYH	PHA	SLB	WSH
Boston	—	14–6	12–8	10–9–1	13–7	13–6	14–6	15–5–2
Chicago	6–14	—	10–10	10–9	7–11–1	6–14	9–11	12–8
Cleveland	8–12	10–10	—	9–11	14–6	9–11	11–9	16–4
Detroit	9–10–1	9–10	11–9	—	10–9	11–9	6–14	9–10
New York	7–13	11–7–1	6–14	9–10	—	10–8–1	15–5	14–5
Philadelphia	6–13	14–6	11–9	9–11	8–10–1	—	11–8	16–3–1
St. Louis	6–14	11–9	9–11	14–6	5–15	8–11	—	12–8
Washington	5–15–2	8–12	4–16	10–9	5–14	3–16–1	8–12	—

=== Roster ===
1903 Cleveland Naps
Roster
Pitchers: Bill Bernhard; Red Donahue; Gus Dorner; Martin Glendon; Addie Joss; Ed Killian; Earl Moore; Alex Pearson; Bill Pounds; Bob Rhoads; Jesse Stovall; Ed Walker; Gene Wright	Catchers: Fred Abbott; Harry Bemis; Infielders: Bill Bradley; Billy Clingman; John Gochnaur; Charlie Hickman; Nap Lajoie; Jack Slattery	Outfielders: Harry Bay; Elmer Flick; Jack Hardy; Hugh Hill; Happy Iott; Jack McCarthy; Jack Thoney	Manager: Bill Armour

== Player stats ==
=== Batting ===
==== Starters by position ====
Note: Pos = Position; G = Games played; AB = At bats; H = Hits; Avg. = Batting average; HR = Home runs; RBI = Runs batted in

Pos	Player	G	AB	H	Avg.	HR	RBI
C	Fred Abbott	77	255	60	.235	1	25
1B	Charlie Hickman	131	522	154	.295	12	97
2B	Nap Lajoie	125	485	167	.344	7	93
SS	John Gochnaur	134	438	81	.185	0	48
3B	Bill Bradley	136	536	168	.313	6	68
OF	Elmer Flick	140	523	155	.296	2	51
OF	Jack McCarthy	108	415	110	.265	0	43
OF	Harry Bay	140	579	169	.292	1	35

==== Other batters ====
Note: G = Games played; AB = At bats; H = Hits; Avg. = Batting average; HR = Home runs; RBI = Runs batted in

Player	G	AB	H	Avg.	HR	RBI
Harry Bemis	92	314	82	.261	1	41
Jack Thoney	32	122	25	.205	1	9
Billy Clingman	21	64	18	.281	0	7
Jack Hardy	5	19	3	.158	0	1
Jack Slattery	4	11	0	.000	0	0
Happy Iott	3	10	2	.200	0	0
Hugh Hill	1	1	0	.000	0	0

=== Pitching ===
==== Starting pitchers ====
Note: G = Games pitched; IP = Innings pitched; W = Wins; L = Losses; ERA = Earned run average; SO = Strikeouts

Player	G	IP	W	L	ERA	SO
Addie Joss	32	283.2	18	13	2.19	120
Earl Moore	29	247.2	20	8	1.74	148
Bill Bernhard	20	165.2	14	6	2.12	60
Red Donahue	16	136.2	7	9	2.44	45
Gene Wright	15	101.2	3	10	5.75	42
Ed Killian	9	61.2	3	4	2.48	18
Jesse Stovall	6	57.0	5	1	2.05	12
Bob Rhoads	5	41.0	2	3	5.27	21
Martin Glendon	3	27.2	1	2	0.98	9
Ed Walker	3	12.0	0	1	5.25	4

==== Other pitchers ====
Note: G = Games pitched; IP = Innings pitched; W = Wins; L = Losses; ERA = Earned run average; SO = Strikeouts

Player	G	IP	W	L	ERA	SO
Gus Dorner	12	73.2	3	5	4.52	28
Alex Pearson	4	30.1	1	2	3.56	12

==== Relief pitchers ====
Note: G = Games pitched; W = Wins; L = Losses; SV = Saves; ERA = Earned run average; SO = Strikeouts

Player	G	W	L	SV	ERA	SO
Bill Pounds	1	0	0	0	10.80	2
