= 1903 Chicago White Stockings season =

1903 Chicago White Stockings
- League: American League
- Ballpark: South Side Park
- City: Chicago
- Record: 60–77 (.438)
- League place: 7th
- Owners: Charles Comiskey
- Managers: Nixey Callahan

The 1903 Chicago White Stockings Season 3rd season of franchise's Chicago White Stockings

== Regular season ==
=== Season standings ===
American League
Team	W	L	Pct.	GB	Home	Road
Boston Americans	91	47	.659	—	49‍–‍20	42‍–‍27
Philadelphia Athletics	75	60	.556	14½	44‍–‍21	31‍–‍39
Cleveland Naps	77	63	.550	15	49‍–‍25	28‍–‍38
New York Highlanders	72	62	.537	17	41‍–‍26	31‍–‍36
Detroit Tigers	65	71	.478	25	37‍–‍28	28‍–‍43
St. Louis Browns	65	74	.468	26½	38‍–‍32	27‍–‍42
Chicago White Stockings	60	77	.438	30½	41‍–‍28	19‍–‍49
Washington Senators	43	94	.314	47½	29‍–‍40	14‍–‍54

=== Record vs. opponents ===
1903 American League record Sources:
Team	BOS	CWS	CLE	DET	NYH	PHA	SLB	WSH
Boston	—	14–6	12–8	10–9–1	13–7	13–6	14–6	15–5–2
Chicago	6–14	—	10–10	10–9	7–11–1	6–14	9–11	12–8
Cleveland	8–12	10–10	—	9–11	14–6	9–11	11–9	16–4
Detroit	9–10–1	9–10	11–9	—	10–9	11–9	6–14	9–10
New York	7–13	11–7–1	6–14	9–10	—	10–8–1	15–5	14–5
Philadelphia	6–13	14–6	11–9	9–11	8–10–1	—	11–8	16–3–1
St. Louis	6–14	11–9	9–11	14–6	5–15	8–11	—	12–8
Washington	5–15–2	8–12	4–16	10–9	5–14	3–16–1	8–12	—

=== Notable transactions ===
- June 13, 1903: The White Stockings traded a player to be named later to the Washington Senators for Ducky Holmes. The White Stockings completed the deal by sending Davey Dunkle to the Senators on July 20.

=== Roster ===
1903 Chicago White Stockings
Roster
Pitchers: Nick Altrock; Davey Dunkle; Patsy Flaherty; Frank Owen; Roy Patterson; Doc White	Catchers: Ed McFarland; Jack Slattery; Billy Sullivan; Infielders: Nixey Callahan; Pep Clark; Tom Daly; Cozy Dolan; Frank Isbell; George Magoon; Lee Tannehill	Outfielders: Danny Green; Bill Hallman; Ducky Holmes; Fielder Jones	Manager: Nixey Callahan

== Player stats ==
=== Batting ===
==== Starters by position ====
Note: Pos = Position; G = Games played; AB = At bats; H = Hits; Avg. = Batting average; HR = Home runs; RBI = Runs batted in

Pos	Player	G	AB	H	Avg.	HR	RBI
C	Ed McFarland	61	201	42	.209	1	19
1B	Frank Isbell	138	546	132	.242	2	59
2B	George Magoon	94	334	76	.228	0	25
SS	Lee Tannehill	138	503	113	.225	2	50
3B	Nixey Callahan	118	439	128	.292	2	56
OF	Fielder Jones	136	530	152	.287	0	45
OF	Danny Green	135	499	154	.309	6	62
OF	Ducky Holmes	86	344	96	.279	0	18

==== Other batters ====
Note: G = Games played; AB = At bats; H = Hits; Avg. = Batting average; HR = Home runs; RBI = Runs batted in

Player	G	AB	H	Avg.	HR	RBI
Jack Slattery	63	211	46	.218	0	20
Bill Hallman	63	207	43	.208	0	18
Tom Daly	43	150	31	.207	0	19
Billy Sullivan	32	111	21	.189	1	7
Cozy Dolan	27	104	27	.260	0	7
Pep Clark	15	65	20	.308	0	9

=== Pitching ===
==== Starting pitchers ====
Note: G = Games pitched; IP = Innings pitched; W = Wins; L = Losses; ERA = Earned run average; SO = Strikeouts

Player	G	IP	W	L	ERA	SO
Doc White	37	300.0	17	16	2.13	114
Patsy Flaherty	40	293.2	11	25	3.74	65
Roy Patterson	34	293.0	15	15	2.70	89
Frank Owen	26	167.1	8	12	3.50	66
Nixey Callahan	3	28.0	1	2	4.50	12

==== Other pitchers ====
Note: G = Games pitched; IP = Innings pitched; W = Wins; L = Losses; ERA = Earned run average; SO = Strikeouts

Player	G	IP	W	L	ERA	SO
Davey Dunkle	12	82.0	4	4	4.06	26
Nick Altrock	12	71.0	4	3	2.15	19
