= 1903 Washington Senators season =

1903 Washington Senators
- League: American League
- Ballpark: American League Park I
- City: Washington, D.C.
- Record: 43–94 (.314)
- League place: 8th
- Owners: Ban Johnson and Fred Postal
- Managers: Tom Loftus

The 1903 Washington Senators won 43 games, lost 94, and finished in eighth place in the American League. They were managed by Tom Loftus and played home games at the American League Park I.

Washington had finished in sixth place in each of the previous two seasons (the first two seasons of the American League's existence). However, they fell to eighth and last in 1903. Their only star player, Big Ed Delahanty, got drunk and fell off a bridge into Niagara Falls midway through the season.

The Senators' pitching had always been bad, and indeed, they would allow the most runs in the AL, but without Delahanty the offense sputtered to a halt. Their collective batting average was .231, bad even for the dead-ball era, and no one drove in more than 49 runs.

== Regular season ==
=== Season standings ===
American League
Team	W	L	Pct.	GB	Home	Road
Boston Americans	91	47	.659	—	49‍–‍20	42‍–‍27
Philadelphia Athletics	75	60	.556	14½	44‍–‍21	31‍–‍39
Cleveland Naps	77	63	.550	15	49‍–‍25	28‍–‍38
New York Highlanders	72	62	.537	17	41‍–‍26	31‍–‍36
Detroit Tigers	65	71	.478	25	37‍–‍28	28‍–‍43
St. Louis Browns	65	74	.468	26½	38‍–‍32	27‍–‍42
Chicago White Stockings	60	77	.438	30½	41‍–‍28	19‍–‍49
Washington Senators	43	94	.314	47½	29‍–‍40	14‍–‍54

=== Record vs. opponents ===
1903 American League record Sources:
Team	BOS	CWS	CLE	DET	NYH	PHA	SLB	WSH
Boston	—	14–6	12–8	10–9–1	13–7	13–6	14–6	15–5–2
Chicago	6–14	—	10–10	10–9	7–11–1	6–14	9–11	12–8
Cleveland	8–12	10–10	—	9–11	14–6	9–11	11–9	16–4
Detroit	9–10–1	9–10	11–9	—	10–9	11–9	6–14	9–10
New York	7–13	11–7–1	6–14	9–10	—	10–8–1	15–5	14–5
Philadelphia	6–13	14–6	11–9	9–11	8–10–1	—	11–8	16–3–1
St. Louis	6–14	11–9	9–11	14–6	5–15	8–11	—	12–8
Washington	5–15–2	8–12	4–16	10–9	5–14	3–16–1	8–12	—

=== Notable transactions ===
- June 13, 1903: The Senators traded Ducky Holmes to the Chicago White Stockings for a player to be named later. The White Stockings completed the deal by sending Davey Dunkle to the Senators on July 20.

=== Roster ===
1903 Washington Senators
Roster
Pitchers: Davey Dunkle; Al Orth; Casey Patten; Happy Townsend; Highball Wilson; Catchers: Lew Drill; Malachi Kittridge	Infielders: Scoops Carey; Boileryard Clarke; Bill Coughlin; Gene DeMontreville; Joe Martin; Barry McCormick; Charles Moran; Champ Osteen; Rabbit Robinson	Outfielders: Ed Delahanty; Jack Hendricks; Ducky Holmes; Watty Lee; Jimmy Ryan; Kip Selbach	Manager: Tom Loftus

== Player stats ==
=== Batting ===
==== Starters by position ====
Note: Pos = Position; G = Games played; AB = At bats; H = Hits; Avg. = Batting average; HR = Home runs; RBI = Runs batted in

Pos	Player	G	AB	H	Avg.	HR	RBI
C	Malachi Kittridge	60	192	41	.214	0	16
1B	Boileryard Clarke	126	465	111	.239	2	38
2B	Barry McCormick	63	219	47	.215	0	23
3B	Bill Coughlin	125	473	116	.245	1	31
SS	Charles Moran	98	373	84	.225	1	24
OF	Watty Lee	75	231	48	.208	0	13
OF	Jimmy Ryan	114	437	109	.249	7	46
OF	Kip Selbach	140	533	134	.251	3	49

==== Other batters ====
Note: G = Games played; AB = At bats; H = Hits; Avg. = Batting average; HR = Home runs; RBI = Runs batted in

Player	G	AB	H	Avg.	HR	RBI
Rabbit Robinson	103	373	79	.212	1	20
Scoops Carey	48	183	37	.202	0	23
Ed Delahanty	42	156	52	.333	1	21
Lew Drill	51	154	39	.253	0	23
Joe Martin	35	119	27	.227	0	27
Jack Hendricks	32	112	20	.179	0	4
Ducky Holmes	21	71	16	.225	1	8
Gene DeMontreville	12	44	12	.273	0	3
Champ Osteen	10	40	8	.200	0	4

=== Pitching ===
==== Starting pitchers ====
Note: G = Games pitched; IP = Innings pitched; W = Wins; L = Losses; ERA = Earned run average; SO = Strikeouts

Player	G	IP	W	L	ERA	SO
Casey Patten	36	300.0	11	22	3.60	133
Al Orth	36	279.2	10	22	4.34	88
Highball Wilson	30	242.1	7	18	3.31	56
Watty Lee	22	166.2	8	12	3.08	70
Davey Dunkle	14	108.1	5	9	4.24	51

==== Other pitchers ====
Note: G = Games pitched; IP = Innings pitched; W = Wins; L = Losses; ERA = Earned run average; SO = Strikeouts

Player	G	IP	W	L	ERA	SO
Happy Townsend	20	126.2	2	11	4.76	54

== Awards and honors ==
=== League top five finishers ===
Al Orth

- AL leader in earned runs allowed (135)
- #2 in AL in losses (22)
- #2 in AL in hits allowed (326)

Casey Patten

- AL leader in home runs allowed (11)
- #2 in AL in losses (22)
- #3 in AL in earned runs allowed (120)
- #4 in AL in hits allowed (313)
- #4 in AL in walks allowed (80)
