= 1903 Philadelphia Athletics season =

1903 Philadelphia Athletics
- League: American League
- Ballpark: Columbia Park
- City: Philadelphia
- Record: 75–60 (.556)
- League place: 2nd
- Owners: Benjamin Shibe, Tom Shibe, John Shibe, Connie Mack, Sam Jones, Frank Hough
- Managers: Connie Mack

The 1903 Philadelphia Athletics season was a season in American baseball. The team finished second in the American League with a record of 75 wins and 60 losses, 14½ games behind the Boston Americans.

== Offseason ==
- February 1903: Ollie Pickering's contract was purchased by the Athletics from the Cleveland Naps.

== Preseason ==
=== 1903 Philadelphia City Series ===
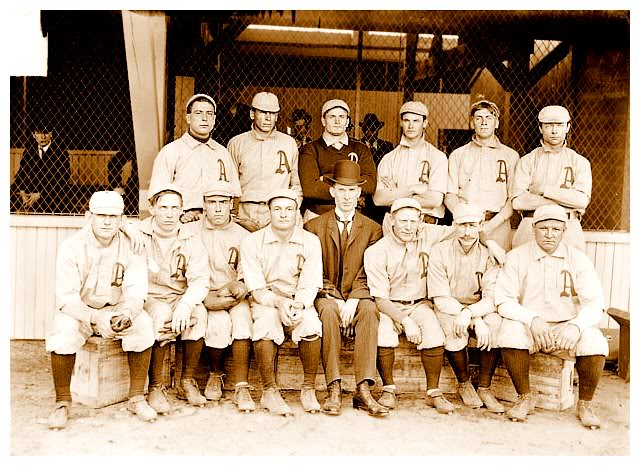
The 1903 Philadelphia Athletics

The A's had begun play in 1901 but National League and American League teams did not play each other in 1901 or 1902 as the leagues battled to expand their markets and customers.

After the leagues made peace after 1902, the Phillies and Athletics scheduled a preseason series for the local championship. The Player League’s Philadelphia Athletics and American Association Athletics had contested the local championship with the Phillies between 1883 and 1890.

Prior to the start of the series, the Athletics players threatened not to play unless they were paid a percentage of the gate receipts. Connie Mack refused his players on the grounds that while their contracts stipulated they receive gate receipts from mid-season exhibition games, the games against the Phillies would occur prior to the start of the official season and would be unpaid exhibition games as much as any preseason contest.

The Phillies and Athletics played five of nine scheduled games; the Phillies defeated the Athletics, 4 games to 1.

The series was scheduled to begin on April 4, 1903 at the Phillies’ Philadelphia Ball Park but was called off due to rain. Games scheduled for April 7, 1903 at the Phillies’ park and April 8, 1903 at the Athletics’ Columbia Park were also canceled due to rain and wet grounds, along with the final scheduled game of the series on April 14, 1903 at the Phillies’ park.

AL Philadelphia Athletics (1) vs. NL Philadelphia Phillies (4)

Game	Date	Score	Location	Time	Attendance
1	April 6, 1903	Philadelphia Phillies – 2, Philadelphia Athletics – 0 (10)	Columbia Park	1:55	6,543
2	April 9, 1903	Philadelphia Athletics – 5, Philadelphia Phillies – 6 (10)	Philadelphia Ball Park	2:10	6,640
3	April 10, 1903	Philadelphia Phillies – 6, Philadelphia Athletics – 3	Columbia Park	1:40	8,771
4	April 11, 1903	Philadelphia Athletics – 7, Philadelphia Phillies – 1	Philadelphia Ball Park	1:38	13,050
5	April 13, 1903	Philadelphia Phillies – 2, Philadelphia Athletics – 1 (10)	Columbia Park	1:40	5,843

== Regular season ==
=== Season standings ===
American League
Team	W	L	Pct.	GB	Home	Road
Boston Americans	91	47	.659	—	49‍–‍20	42‍–‍27
Philadelphia Athletics	75	60	.556	14½	44‍–‍21	31‍–‍39
Cleveland Naps	77	63	.550	15	49‍–‍25	28‍–‍38
New York Highlanders	72	62	.537	17	41‍–‍26	31‍–‍36
Detroit Tigers	65	71	.478	25	37‍–‍28	28‍–‍43
St. Louis Browns	65	74	.468	26½	38‍–‍32	27‍–‍42
Chicago White Stockings	60	77	.438	30½	41‍–‍28	19‍–‍49
Washington Senators	43	94	.314	47½	29‍–‍40	14‍–‍54

=== Record vs. opponents ===
1903 American League record Sources:
Team	BOS	CWS	CLE	DET	NYH	PHA	SLB	WSH
Boston	—	14–6	12–8	10–9–1	13–7	13–6	14–6	15–5–2
Chicago	6–14	—	10–10	10–9	7–11–1	6–14	9–11	12–8
Cleveland	8–12	10–10	—	9–11	14–6	9–11	11–9	16–4
Detroit	9–10–1	9–10	11–9	—	10–9	11–9	6–14	9–10
New York	7–13	11–7–1	6–14	9–10	—	10–8–1	15–5	14–5
Philadelphia	6–13	14–6	11–9	9–11	8–10–1	—	11–8	16–3–1
St. Louis	6–14	11–9	9–11	14–6	5–15	8–11	—	12–8
Washington	5–15–2	8–12	4–16	10–9	5–14	3–16–1	8–12	—

=== Roster ===
1903 Philadelphia Athletics
Roster
Pitchers: Chief Bender; Andy Coakley; Jim Fairbank; Weldon Henley; Connie McGeehan; Ed Pinnance; Eddie Plank; Tad Quinn; Rube Waddell	Catchers: John Callahan; Doc Powers; Ossee Schreckengost; Infielders: Lave Cross; Monte Cross; Bert Daly; Harry Davis; Ed Hilley; Danny Murphy	Outfielders: Topsy Hartsel; Danny Hoffman; Ollie Pickering; Socks Seybold	Manager: Connie Mack

== Postseason ==
=== 1903 Philadelphia City Series (Fall) ===
The Philadelphia Phillies and Athletics played a postseason series for the local championship in addition to the preseason series played in April. The teams played seven of ten games scheduled; games scheduled for October 8, 1903; October 9, 1903; and October 10, 1903 were canceled due to rain. The Athletics won the series, 4 games to 3.

All of the series games were played at the Athletics’ Columbia Park with each team alternating as the home team. The Phillies’ Philadelphia Ball Park’s had collapsed on August 8 1903 leaving four dead, and closing the ballpark for the balance of the season.

AL Philadelphia Athletics (4) vs. NL Philadelphia Phillies (3)

Game	Date	Score	Location	Time	Attendance
1	September 30, 1903	Philadelphia Phillies – 3, Philadelphia Athletics – 7	Columbia Park	1:35	2,008
2	October 1, 1903	Philadelphia Athletics – 6, Philadelphia Phillies – 0	Columbia Park	1:45	2,439
3	October 2, 1903	Philadelphia Phillies – 5, Philadelphia Athletics – 1	Columbia Park	1:40	1,438
4	October 3, 1903	Philadelphia Athletics – 5, Philadelphia Phillies – 0	Columbia Park	1:35	3,896
5	October 5, 1903	Philadelphia Phillies – 1, Philadelphia Athletics – 6	Columbia Park	1:40	-
6	October 6, 1903	Philadelphia Athletics – 2, Philadelphia Phillies – 14 (8)	Columbia Park	1:50	1,084
7	October 7, 1903	Philadelphia Phillies – 13, Philadelphia Athletics – 3	Columbia Park	2:00	992

After the 1903 season, the Phillies had won 7 and the Athletics had won 5 of the 12 total games played in the city series.

== Player stats ==
=== Batting ===
==== Starters by position ====
Note: Pos = Position; G = Games played; AB = At bats; H = Hits; Avg. = Batting average; HR = Home runs; RBI = Runs batted in

Pos	Player	G	AB	H	Avg.	HR	RBI
C	Ossee Schrecongost	92	306	78	.255	3	30
1B	Harry Davis	106	420	125	.298	6	55
2B	Danny Murphy	133	513	140	.273	1	60
SS	Monte Cross	137	470	116	.247	3	45
3B	Lave Cross	137	559	163	.292	2	90
OF	Topsy Hartsel	98	373	116	.311	5	26
OF	Ollie Pickering	137	512	144	.281	1	36
OF	Socks Seybold	137	522	156	.299	8	84

==== Other batters ====
Note: G = Games played; AB = At bats; H = Hits; Avg. = Batting average; HR = Home runs; RBI = Runs batted in

Player	G	AB	H	Avg.	HR	RBI
Danny Hoffman	74	248	61	.246	2	22
Doc Powers	75	247	56	.227	0	23
Bert Daly	10	21	4	.190	0	4
John Callahan	1	5	0	.000	0	0
Ed Hilley	1	3	1	.333	0	0

=== Pitching ===
==== Starting pitchers ====
Note: G = Games pitched; IP = Innings pitched; W = Wins; L = Losses; ERA = Earned run average; SO = Strikeouts

Player	G	IP	W	L	ERA	SO
Eddie Plank	43	336.0	23	16	2.38	176
Rube Waddell	39	324.0	21	16	2.44	302
Chief Bender	36	270.0	17	14	3.07	127
Weldon Henley	29	186.1	12	10	3.91	86

==== Other pitchers ====
Note: G = Games pitched; IP = Innings pitched; W = Wins; L = Losses; ERA = Earned run average; SO = Strikeouts

Player	G	IP	W	L	ERA	SO
Andy Coakley	6	37.2	0	3	5.50	20
Jim Fairbank	4	24.0	1	1	4.88	10
Ed Pinnance	2	7.0	0	0	2.57	2

==== Relief pitchers ====
Note: G = Games pitched; W = Wins; L = Losses; SV = Saves; ERA = Earned run average; SO = Strikeouts

Player	G	W	L	SV	ERA	SO
Connie McGeehan	3	1	0	0	4.50	4
Tad Quinn	2	0	0	0	5.00	1
Danny Hoffman	1	0	0	0	3.00	0
