= George Winter (baseball) =

American baseball player (1878–1951)

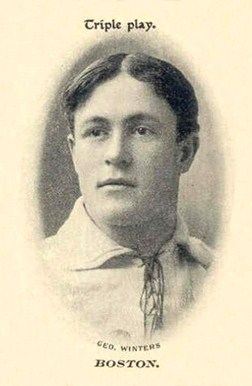
- Pitcher
- Born: April 27, 1878; New Providence, Pennsylvania, U.S.
- Died: May 26, 1951 (aged 73); Franklin Lakes, New Jersey, U.S.
- Batted: Right Threw: Right

MLB debut
- June 15, 1901, for the Boston Americans

Last MLB appearance
- September 18, 1908, for the Detroit Tigers

MLB statistics
- Win–loss record: 83–102
- Earned run average: 2.87
- Strikeouts: 568
- Stats at Baseball Reference

Teams
- Boston Americans/Red Sox (1901–1908); Detroit Tigers (1908)

Career highlights and awards
- World Series champion (1903)

George Lovington Winter, nicknamed "Sassafrass" (April 27, 1878 – May 26, 1951) was an American professional baseball pitcher. Winter played eight seasons in Major League Baseball, from 1901 through 1908, for the Boston Americans/Red Sox (1901–08) and the Detroit Tigers (1908). Listed at 5 ft 8 in (1.73 m) and 155 pounds, Winter batted and threw right-handed.

== Playing career ==
=== Amateur career ===
Winter attended Gettysburg College, where he was a teammate of future Hall of Famer Eddie Plank.

=== Professional career ===
Winter was a member of the original Boston American League team, which joined the league in 1901 when it became a major league. The Philadelphia Athletics passed on signing him because their owner and manager, Connie Mack, believed he was too small to pitch in the major leagues. For the second-place Americans in his first season, he won 16 games. The following year, he won 11 games. Late in the season he became seriously ill with typhoid fever, which was nearly fatal.

Winter was chosen to start on Opening Day of the 1903 season, defeating Rube Waddell and the Philadelphia Athletics, 9–4, at Huntington Avenue Grounds. He also wound up pitching in the game in which the Americans clinched the pennant, although he did not play in the 1903 World Series as Boston used only Cy Young, Bill Dinneen and Long Tom Hughes. Winter worked as a ticket taker during the series. He was intermittently effective during the 1903 season, which the 1904 Reach Guide attributed to not being fully recovered from his illness.

In 1904, Winter slipped down to the Americans' fifth starter behind Young, Dinneen, Jesse Tannehill and Norwood Gibson. He appeared in 20 games, going 8–4. In 1905, he equaled his career high, winning 16 games while losing 17. He had perhaps the best game of his career that year in a losing effort. Against the Washington Senators, he pitched a one-hitter but lost the game, 1–0.

In 1906, Winter's record slipped to 6–18 for the last-place Americans, with a career-worst 4.12 earned run average. He bounced back in 1907 to win 12 games and have a career-best 2.07 ERA. In 1908, Winter was the only member of the 1901 team to remain with the team, which was now known as the "Red Sox". However, he would not last the season in Boston, as he was claimed off waivers by the Tigers on July 26. After not appearing in the 1903 World Series, Winter made his last major league appearance in 1908 with Detroit, when he pitched one scoreless inning of relief in Game Four. The Tigers lost to the Chicago Cubs, four games to one.

Winter played two seasons of minor league baseball with the Montreal Royals before retiring after the 1910 season.

=== Overview ===
In an eight-season career, Winter posted an 83–102 record with 568 strikeouts and a 2.87 ERA in 220 appearances, including 182 starts, 146 complete games, nine shutouts, 36 games finished, four saves, and 1656 innings pitched. He helped himself with the bat, hitting .193 with one home run and 20 RBI. He pitched 200 or more innings five times.

In 2007, Winter was ranked at #94 in a list of the Top 100 Red Sox by a group of Red Sox bloggers.

== Death ==
Winter died in Franklin Lakes, New Jersey at age 73 and was interred at Riverview Cemetery in Wilmington, Delaware.
