= Dick Padden =

American baseball player (1870–1922)

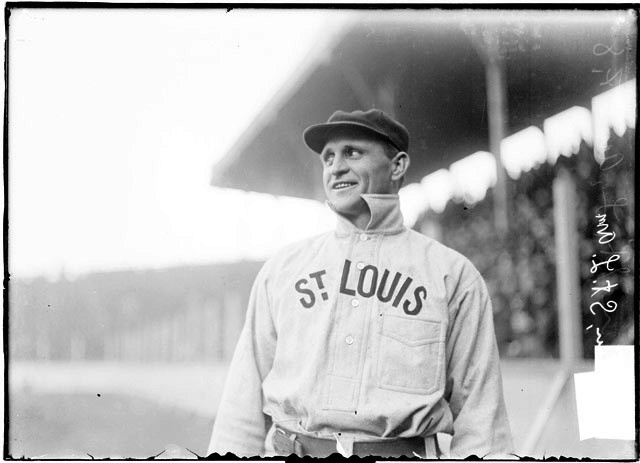
- Padden in South Side Park, Chicago in 1905
- Second baseman
- Born: September 17, 1870; Wheeling, West Virginia, U.S.
- Died: October 31, 1922 (aged 52); Martins Ferry, Ohio, U.S.
- Batted: Right Threw: Right

MLB debut
- July 15, 1896, for the Pittsburgh Pirates

Last MLB appearance
- May 2, 1905, for the St. Louis Browns

MLB statistics
- Batting average: .258
- Home runs: 11
- Runs batted in: 334
- Stats at Baseball Reference

Teams
- Pittsburgh Pirates (1896–1898); Washington Senators (1899); St. Louis Cardinals (1901); St. Louis Browns (1902–1905)

Richard Joseph Padden (September 17, 1870 – October 31, 1922), nicknamed "Brains", was an American professional baseball player, born in Wheeling, West Virginia, who played mainly as a second baseman in Major League Baseball for nine seasons from 1896 to 1905.

After playing a season and a half in the minor leagues, the right-handed infielder began his major league career for the Pittsburgh Pirates. He played three seasons in Pittsburgh, from 1896 to 1898, before playing one season for the Washington Senators in 1899. He returned to the minor leagues for the 1900 season, where he was the player-manager for the Chicago White Sox, then a minor league team. When the Chicago club entered the American League, a major league, the following season, he moved on to play one season for the St. Louis Cardinals, before becoming Captain of the St. Louis Browns from 1902 and 1905. In total, Padden played in 874 games, and collected 814 hits in 3545 at bats, for a lifetime batting average of .258. He finished in the league's top-ten finishers in being hit by pitches six times, including a league-leading 18 in 1904.

Padden's post-career activities included duties as a talent scout for the St. Louis Browns and the Washington Senators, as well a lengthy career in the flint glass industry in Ohio. After retiring, he attempted to gain the Democratic Party nomination for the 1912 mayoral race in his hometown of Martin's Ferry, Ohio. He died there, in 1922, at the age of 52 of apoplexy.

== Career ==
=== Pittsburgh ===
Padden began his professional career with the Roanoke Magicians, a minor league club in the Virginia State League in 1895, where he played with and managed the team to a 52–74 win–loss record. During the 1896 season, the Pittsburgh Pirates manager, Connie Mack, was seeking a replacement for Harry Truby, his second baseman, who was not performing well, when Padden caught his attention. Padden was playing for the Toronto Canadiens in the Eastern League, and had a reputation of being a smart and quick player with good instincts, as well as a "careful, timely batsman". Based on his need to upgrade his second base position, and Padden's good reputation, Mack traded Truby for him. He began his major league career shortly thereafter on July 15, one day after Truby's final game in the majors. When Padden did not bat well to start the season, Mack and Pittsburgh's president and part owner, William Kerr, began to feud over the decision, with Kerr questioning Mack over whether they should have traded Truby. However, his hitting improved and he completed the season with a .242 batting average in 61 games played.

In 1897, with the Pirates, he led all National League second basemen with 134 games played, and 369 putouts. Besides games played, he established career highs in several batting categories that season, including; 517 at bats, 84 runs scored, 146 hits, 10 triples, and tied his career high in home runs with two. He made 128 appearances in 1898, again as their starting second baseman. His statistical output dropped from his previous season; his batting average lowered to .257, and scored 61 runs in 463 at bats.

=== Washington ===
On December 14, 1898, after the season was completed, Padden was traded, along with Jack O'Brien and Jimmy Slagle, to the Washington Senators in exchange for Heinie Reitz. He played the 1899 season in Washington, and appeared in 134 games as their starting shortstop. He had a batting average of .277, established his career high in stolen bases (27), and was ejected from the game by the umpire three times, which led the league.

=== Chicago ===
Following the 1899 season, the Senators franchise ceased operations, which resulted in Padden's sale, along with O'Brien, to the Detroit Tigers of the American League, which was a minor league at the time. However, before the 1900 season began, he joined the Chicago White Sox, also a minor league team, as their player-manager instead. On May 16, he was involved in a physical altercation with Ducky Holmes and another Detroit player. While playing a doubleheader on September 16, against Connie Mack and his Milwaukee team, Padden suggested to Mack that the second game be shortened to five innings due to the fact that the first game lasted just over three hours, and they might not finish the second game before darkness. Mack, who estimated that he could get five more good innings from his game one starting pitcher, Rube Waddell, quickly agreed. Padden's suggestion backfired, and turned into a successful strategy for Mack, whose team, with Waddell pitching, won the game. Despite that incident, Padden and his leadership skills led the White Sox to the American League championship that season.

=== St. Louis ===
The White Sox stayed with the American League as they became a major league in 1901, but Padden moved on to play for the St. Louis Cardinals of the National League. He was the team's starting second baseman, and played in a total of 123 games. He had a batting average of .256 that season, and again led the league in ejections, with five; however, he stole 26 bases, he had 62 RBIs, his highest single season total.

After his lone season with the Cardinals, Padden, along with many of his teammates deserted to the newly created St. Louis Browns franchise, which was scheduled to begin playing in 1902 in the American League. Padden was Captain of the Browns during his time on the team. In both 1902 and 1904, he was the Browns' starting second baseman, and were the only two of his four seasons with the club in which he played in more than 29 games. He led the league in hit by a pitches with 18 in 1904, the only time in which he led the league in this category, although he did finish in the league's top-ten five times previously. On May 19, 1905, after 16 games, Padden was released by the Browns, and his major league career came to an end.

== Post-major league career ==
Padden was the player-manager for the minor league team St. Paul Saints of the American Association for the 1906 season. He had a batting average of .288 that year, and hit three home runs. He stayed with the Saints for the 1907 season, but as a player only. After 52 games played, his season ended when he sprained his ankle. After his injury, he and his Saints manager, Mr. Ashenbach attempted to buy the Daytona Beach team of the Eastern League, but were unsuccessful. He had hoped that his ankle would heal, so that he could be ready for the next season, but he never appeared as a player after the injury.

Following his retirement as a player, Padden returned to his old team and became a talent scout for the Browns in 1909. He also became a talent scout for the Senators and worked in the flint glass industry in Ohio. Alfred Henry Spink described him as "one of the real foxy fellows of the baseball world. He could field beautifully and was never better than when being hard driven." Padden retired to Martins Ferry, Ohio where in 1912, he tried to secure the Democratic Party nomination for the mayoral race. He died in Martins Ferry of apoplexy on October 31, 1922 at the age of 52, and is interred at St. Marys Cemetery.
