= 1903 New York Highlanders season =

Baseball team season

1903 New York Highlanders
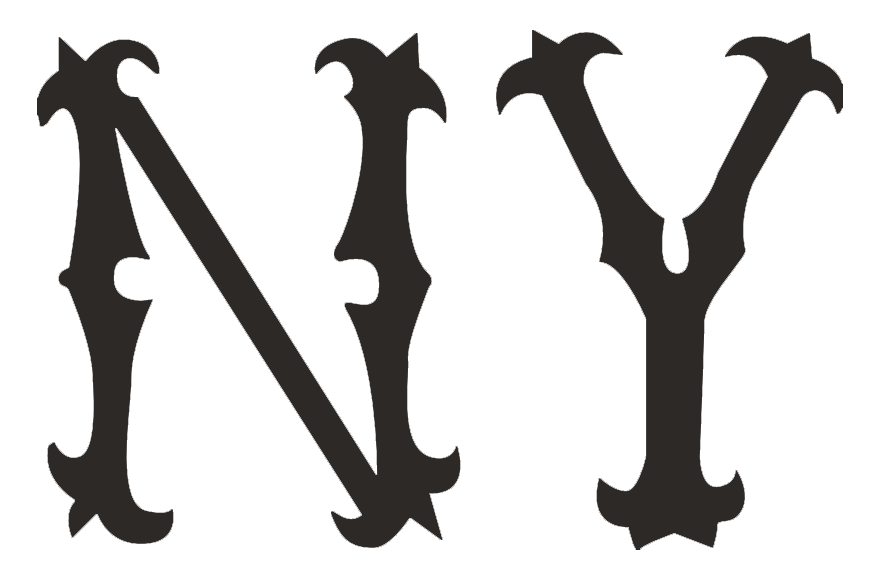
- League: American League
- Ballpark: Hilltop Park
- City: New York City
- Record: 72–62 (.537)
- League place: 4th
- Owners: William Devery and Frank Farrell
- Managers: Clark Griffith

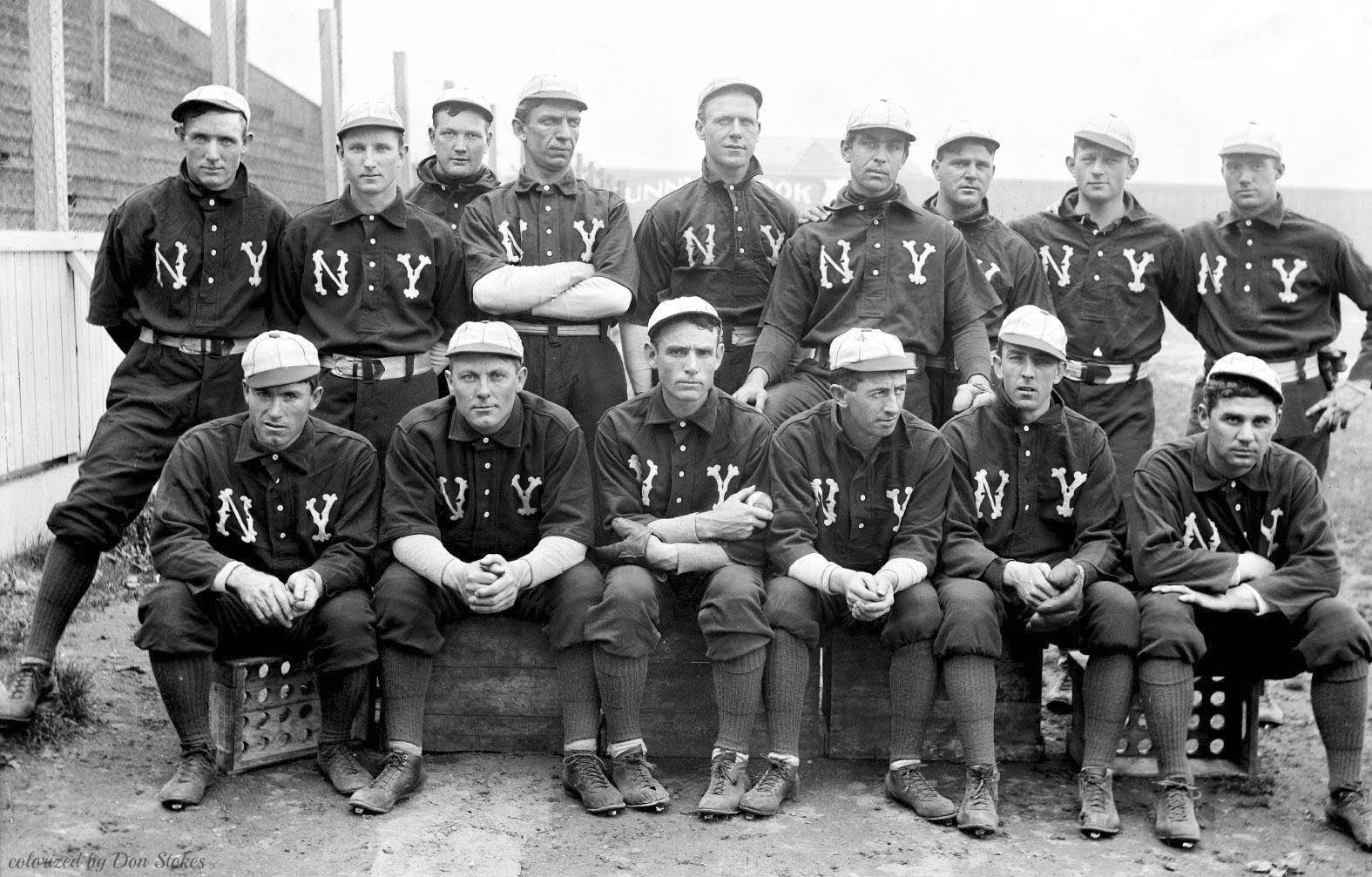
The team

The New York Highlanders' 1903 season was the team's first. The team was founded as a replacement in the American League for the defunct Baltimore Orioles, was managed by Clark Griffith and played its home games at Hilltop Park (formally "American League Park"). The club was at first officially the "Greater New York" baseball club, in deference to the established New York Giants, which were based in the Polo Grounds. This was the first season for the franchise that would be later known as the now-storied New York Yankees. They finished in 4th place in the AL with a record of 72–62.

== Team name ==
The media dubbed the team as "Highlanders", due in part to playing at one of the highest points on Manhattan ("The Hilltop"), which was somewhat higher in altitude than the bulk of Manhattan and was considerably "uphill" from the Polo Grounds, the Giants' established home, which sat in the bottomland in Coogan's Hollow, a few blocks east and south of the Hilltop.

"Highlanders" was also originally short for "Gordon's Highlanders", a play on the name of the team President during 1903–1906, Joseph Gordon, along with the noted British military unit called The Gordon Highlanders. The club was also derisively called "Invaders" in 1903, presumably by writers favorable to the Giants.

The New York press was creative with analogous nicknames for teams. In addition to "Highlanders", the team would soon acquire the alternate nickname "Yankees", the name that would soon become official and more famous among baseball fans in the coming decades. That word is a synonym for "American" in general, and short for American Leaguers or "Americans" in this case. Given the media's penchant for citing popular culture, that nickname was also possibly influenced by the then-current and hugely popular America-centric George M. Cohan Broadway play, "Little Johnny Jones", and its centerpiece song, "Yankee Doodle Dandy". New York writers had similarly coined both the established nickname Brooklyn "[Trolley] Dodgers" and the nickname "Superbas" that the denizens of Flatbush carried for a while. As with the Highlanders, the latter was based on something unrelated, namely a circus act called "Hanlon's Superbas"; the Dodgers were managed by Ned Hanlon at that time.

== Offseason ==
- Prior to 1903 season: Jack O'Connor jumped to the Highlanders from the Pittsburgh Pirates.

== Regular season ==
=== Season standings ===
American League
Team	W	L	Pct.	GB	Home	Road
Boston Americans	91	47	.659	—	49‍–‍20	42‍–‍27
Philadelphia Athletics	75	60	.556	14½	44‍–‍21	31‍–‍39
Cleveland Naps	77	63	.550	15	49‍–‍25	28‍–‍38
New York Highlanders	72	62	.537	17	41‍–‍26	31‍–‍36
Detroit Tigers	65	71	.478	25	37‍–‍28	28‍–‍43
St. Louis Browns	65	74	.468	26½	38‍–‍32	27‍–‍42
Chicago White Stockings	60	77	.438	30½	41‍–‍28	19‍–‍49
Washington Senators	43	94	.314	47½	29‍–‍40	14‍–‍54

=== Record vs. opponents ===
1903 American League record Sources:
Team	BOS	CWS	CLE	DET	NYH	PHA	SLB	WSH
Boston	—	14–6	12–8	10–9–1	13–7	13–6	14–6	15–5–2
Chicago	6–14	—	10–10	10–9	7–11–1	6–14	9–11	12–8
Cleveland	8–12	10–10	—	9–11	14–6	9–11	11–9	16–4
Detroit	9–10–1	9–10	11–9	—	10–9	11–9	6–14	9–10
New York	7–13	11–7–1	6–14	9–10	—	10–8–1	15–5	14–5
Philadelphia	6–13	14–6	11–9	9–11	8–10–1	—	11–8	16–3–1
St. Louis	6–14	11–9	9–11	14–6	5–15	8–11	—	12–8
Washington	5–15–2	8–12	4–16	10–9	5–14	3–16–1	8–12	—

=== Roster ===
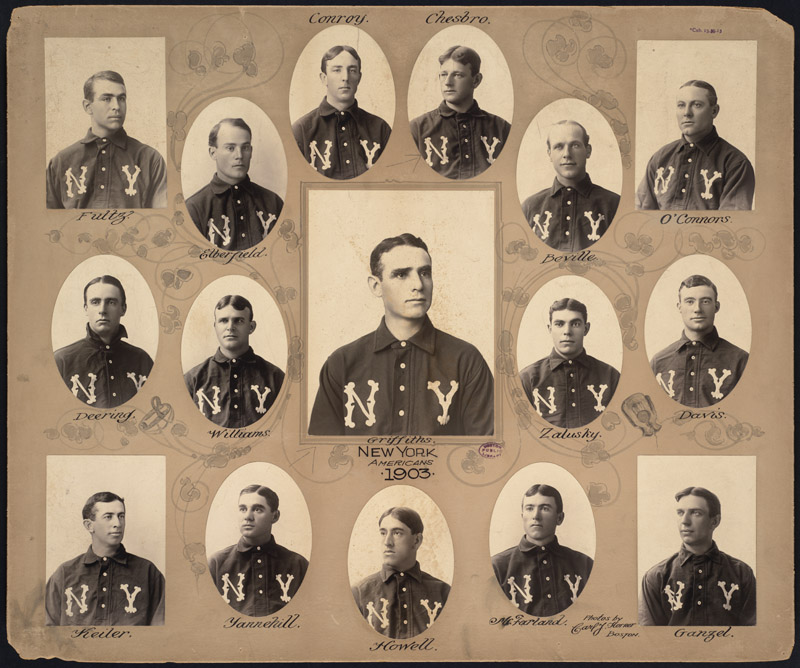
The 1903 New York Highlanders

1903 New York Highlanders
Roster
Pitchers: Doc Adkins; Elmer Bliss; Jack Chesbro; John Deering; Clark Griffith; Harry Howell; Ambrose Puttmann; Eddie Quick; Jesse Tannehill; Snake Wiltse; Barney Wolfe	Catchers: Monte Beville; Pat McCauley; Jack O'Connor; Jack Zalusky; Infielders: Wid Conroy; Ernie Courtney; Kid Elberfeld; John Ganzel; Paddy Greene; Fred Holmes; Tim Jordan; Herman Long; Jimmy Williams	Outfielders: Lefty Davis; Dave Fultz; Herm McFarland; Willie Keeler	Manager: Clark Griffith

== Player stats ==
=== Batting ===
==== Starters by position ====
Note: Pos = Position; G = Games played; AB = At bats; H = Hits; Avg. = Batting average; HR = Home runs; RBI = Runs batted in

Pos	Player	G	AB	H	Avg.	HR	RBI
C	Monte Beville	82	258	50	.194	0	29
1B	John Ganzel	129	476	132	.277	3	71
2B	Jimmy Williams	132	502	134	.267	3	82
3B	Wid Conroy	126	503	137	.272	1	45
SS	Kid Elberfeld	90	349	100	.287	0	45
OF	Willie Keeler	132	512	160	.313	0	32
OF	Herm McFarland	103	362	88	.243	5	45
OF	Lefty Davis	104	372	88	.237	0	25

==== Other batters ====
Note: G = Games played; AB = At bats; H = Hits; Avg. = Batting average; HR = Home runs; RBI = Runs batted in

Player	G	AB	H	Avg.	HR	RBI
Dave Fultz	79	295	66	.224	0	25
Jack O'Connor	64	212	43	.203	0	12
Herman Long	22	80	15	.188	0	8
Ernie Courtney	25	79	21	.266	1	8
Pat McCauley	6	19	1	.053	0	1
Jack Zalusky	7	16	5	.313	0	1
Paddy Greene	4	13	4	.308	0	0
Tim Jordan	2	8	1	.125	0	0
Fred Holmes	1	0	0	----	0	0

=== Pitching ===
==== Starting pitchers ====
Note: G = Games pitched; IP = Innings pitched; W = Wins; L = Losses; ERA = Earned run average; SO = Strikeouts

Player	G	IP	W	L	ERA	SO
Jack Chesbro	40	324.2	21	15	2.77	147
Jesse Tannehill	32	239.2	15	15	3.27	106
Clark Griffith	25	213.0	14	11	2.70	69
Barney Wolfe	20	148.1	6	9	2.97	48
John Deering	9	60.0	4	3	3.75	14
Snake Wiltse	4	25.0	0	3	5.40	6
Eddie Quick	1	2.0	0	0	9.00	0

==== Other pitchers ====
Note: G = Games pitched; IP = Innings pitched; W = Wins; L = Losses; ERA = Earned run average; SO = Strikeouts

Player	G	IP	W	L	ERA	SO
Harry Howell	25	155.2	9	6	3.53	62
Ambrose Puttmann	3	19.0	2	0	0.95	8
Doc Adkins	2	7.0	0	0	7.71	0

==== Relief pitchers ====
Note: G = Games pitched; W = Wins; L = Losses; SV = Saves; ERA = Earned run average; SO = Strikeouts

Player	G	W	L	SV	ERA	SO
Elmer Bliss	1	1	0	0	0.00	3
