= 1903 Detroit Tigers season =

Major League Baseball season

1903 Detroit Tigers
- League: American League
- Ballpark: Bennett Park
- City: Detroit, Michigan
- Record: 65–71 (.478)
- League place: 5th
- Owners: Samuel F. Angus
- Managers: Ed Barrow

1903 was the third year for the Detroit Tigers in the still-new American League. The team finished in fifth place with a record or 65–71 (.478), 25 games behind the Boston Americans. The 1903 Tigers outscored their opponents 567 to 539. The team's attendance at Bennett Park was 224,523, sixth out of the eight teams in the AL.

== Regular season ==
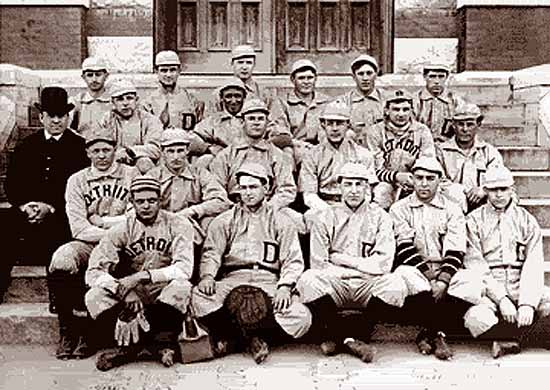
The 1903 Detroit Tigers

=== Season standings ===
American League
Team	W	L	Pct.	GB	Home	Road
Boston Americans	91	47	.659	—	49‍–‍20	42‍–‍27
Philadelphia Athletics	75	60	.556	14½	44‍–‍21	31‍–‍39
Cleveland Naps	77	63	.550	15	49‍–‍25	28‍–‍38
New York Highlanders	72	62	.537	17	41‍–‍26	31‍–‍36
Detroit Tigers	65	71	.478	25	37‍–‍28	28‍–‍43
St. Louis Browns	65	74	.468	26½	38‍–‍32	27‍–‍42
Chicago White Stockings	60	77	.438	30½	41‍–‍28	19‍–‍49
Washington Senators	43	94	.314	47½	29‍–‍40	14‍–‍54

=== Record vs. opponents ===
1903 American League record Sources:
Team	BOS	CWS	CLE	DET	NYH	PHA	SLB	WSH
Boston	—	14–6	12–8	10–9–1	13–7	13–6	14–6	15–5–2
Chicago	6–14	—	10–10	10–9	7–11–1	6–14	9–11	12–8
Cleveland	8–12	10–10	—	9–11	14–6	9–11	11–9	16–4
Detroit	9–10–1	9–10	11–9	—	10–9	11–9	6–14	9–10
New York	7–13	11–7–1	6–14	9–10	—	10–8–1	15–5	14–5
Philadelphia	6–13	14–6	11–9	9–11	8–10–1	—	11–8	16–3–1
St. Louis	6–14	11–9	9–11	14–6	5–15	8–11	—	12–8
Washington	5–15–2	8–12	4–16	10–9	5–14	3–16–1	8–12	—

=== Roster ===
1903 Detroit Tigers
Roster
Pitchers: John Deering; Bill Donovan; Mal Eason; Alex Jones; Harry Kane; Rube Kisinger; Frank Kitson; George Mullin; John Skopec	Catchers: Fritz Buelow; Deacon McGuire; Infielders: Jack Burns; Charlie Carr; Ernie Courtney; Kid Elberfeld; Paddy Greene; Herman Long; Sport McAllister; John Murphy; Simon Nicholls; Heinie Smith; Joe Yeager	Outfielders: Jimmy Barrett; Sam Crawford; Doc Gessler; Billy Lush	Manager: Ed Barrow

== Player stats ==
=== Batting ===
==== Starters by position ====
Note: Pos = Position; G = Games played; AB = At bats; H = Hits; Avg. = Batting average; HR = Home runs; RBI = Runs batted in

Pos	Player	G	AB	H	Avg.	HR	RBI
C	Deacon McGuire	72	248	62	.250	0	21
1B	Charlie Carr	135	548	154	.281	2	79
2B	Heinie Smith	93	336	75	.223	1	22
3B	Joe Yeager	109	402	103	.256	0	43
SS	Sport McAllister	78	265	69	.260	0	22
OF	Sam Crawford	137	550	184	.335	4	89
OF	Jimmy Barrett	136	517	163	.315	2	31
OF	Billy Lush	119	423	116	.274	1	33

==== Other batters ====
Note: G = Games played; AB = At bats; H = Hits; Avg. = Batting average; HR = Home runs; RBI = Runs batted in

Player	G	AB	H	Avg.	HR	RBI
Herman Long	69	239	53	.222	0	23
Fritz Buelow	63	192	41	.214	1	13
Kid Elberfeld	35	132	45	.341	0	19
Doc Gessler	29	105	25	.238	0	12
Ernie Courtney	23	74	17	.230	0	6
Jack Burns	11	37	10	.270	0	3
John Murphy	5	22	4	.182	0	1
Simon Nicholls	2	8	3	.375	0	0
Paddy Greene	1	3	0	.000	0	0

Note: pitchers' batting statistics not included

=== Pitching ===
==== Starting pitchers ====
Note: G = Games pitched; IP = Innings pitched; W = Wins; L = Losses; ERA = Earned run average; SO = Strikeouts

Player	G	IP	W	L	ERA	SO
George Mullin	41	320.2	19	15	2.25	170
Bill Donovan	35	307.0	17	16	2.29	187
Frank Kitson	31	257.2	15	162	2.58	102
Rube Kisinger	16	118.2	7	9	2.96	33
John Deering	10	60.2	3	4	3.86	14
Mal Eason	7	56.1	2	5	3.36	21
John Skopec	6	39.1	2	2	3.43	14
Harry Kane	3	18.0	0	2	8.50	10
Joe Yeager	1	9.0	0	1	4.00	1
Alex Jones	2	8.2	0	1	12.46	2

== Awards and honors ==
=== League top five finishers ===
Jimmy Barrett

- AL leader in on-base percentage (.407)
- AL leader in bases on balls (74)
- AL leader in times on base (243)
- #4 in AL in batting average (.315)
- #3 in AL in runs scored (95)
- #3 in AL in plate appearances (615)
- #4 in AL in singles (138)

Sam Crawford

- AL leader in runs created (98)
- MLB leader in triples (25)
- #2 in AL in batting average (.335)
- #2 in AL in hits (184)
- #2 in AL in total bases (269)
- #3 in AL in OPS (.855)
- #3 in AL in times on base (211)
- #4 in AL in slugging percentage (.489)
- #4 in AL in sacrifice hits (25)
- #5 in AL in RBIs (89)

Bill Donovan

- #2 in AL in strikeouts (187)
- #2 in MLB in hits allowed per 9 innings pitched (7.24)
- #2 in AL in strikeouts per 9 innings pitched (5.48)
- #2 in AL in bases on balls allowed (95)
- #5 in AL in wild pitches (7)

Harry "Candy" Kane

- 2nd youngest player in AL (19)

Frank Kitson

- #4 in AL in home runs allowed (8)

Billy Lush

- MLB leader in sacrifice hits (34)
- #2 in AL in bases on balls (70)
- #3 in on-base percentage (.379)

Deacon McGuire

- 2nd oldest player in the AL (39)

George Mullin

- AL leader in saves (2)
- AL leader in bases on balls allowed (106)
- #2 in AL in shutouts (6)
- #2 in games (41)
- #3 in AL in batters faced (1345)
- #5 in AL in strikeouts per 9 innings pitched (4.77)
- #5 in AL in strikeouts (170)
- #6 in AL in ERA (2.26)

Joe Yeager

- #4 in AL in times hit by pitch (9)
