= John Callahan =

John Callahan may refer to:

- John Callahan (actor) (1953–2020), American actor; best known from the soap opera All My Children
- John Callahan (cartoonist) (1951–2010), cartoonist

- John Callahan's Quads!, a 2001 animated television series

- John Callahan (Wisconsin politician) (1865–1956), Wisconsin Superintendent of Public Instruction
- John B. Callahan (born 1969), mayor of Bethlehem, Pennsylvania and Democratic nominee for the U.S. House of Representatives
- John F. Callahan, writer and editor of numerous volumes related to African-American literature
- John H. Callahan (1845–1914), American Civil War soldier and Medal of Honor recipient
- John M. Callahan, chairman of the Democratic Party of Wisconsin
- John Ross Callahan (1853–1918), American dentist
- John Callahan (catcher) (1878–1952), American baseball player
- John Callahan (pitcher) (1874–1954), baseball player
- John Callahan (skier) (born 1962), American Olympic skier
- John Callahan (wrestler) (born 1964), American professional wrestler
- John Callahan (outlaw) (1866–1936), American outlaw and bank robber

== See also ==
- John Callaghan (disambiguation)
- Jack Callahan (disambiguation)
