= Jack Callahan =

Jack Callahan may refer to:

- Jack Callahan (cartoonist) (1888–1954)
- Jack Callahan (Neighbours), fictional character on the Australian soap opera Neighbours
- Jack Callahan (coach), head coach of Old Dominion Monarchs baseball and basketball (1947–1948)
- Jack Callahan (musician)

== See also ==
- Jack O'Callahan, retired American hockey player
- John Callahan (disambiguation)
