= Ed Hughes (baseball) =

American baseball player (1880–1927)

- Pitcher
- Born: October 5, 1880; Chicago
- Died: October 11, 1927 (aged 47); McHenry, Illinois
- Batted: Right Threw: Right

MLB debut
- August 29, 1902, for the Chicago White Sox

Last MLB appearance
- May 31, 1906, for the Boston Americans

MLB statistics
- Win–loss record: 3–2
- Earned run average: 4.78
- Strikeouts: 12
- Stats at Baseball Reference

Teams
- Chicago White Sox (1902); Boston Americans (1905–1906)

Edward J. Hughes (October 5, 1880 – October 11, 1927) was an American Major League Baseball player for the Chicago White Sox (1902) and Boston Red Sox (1905–06). Hughes batted and threw right-handed. He was born in Chicago.

Hughes started his majors career as a catcher with the Chicago National League team. Converted to a pitcher, he jumped to the American League with Boston. He was the first player to ever be on both Sox teams.

As a pitcher, Hughes posted a 3–2 record with 12 strikeouts and a 4.78 ERA in 43 and a third innings pitched, including two complete games. He was a .190 hitter (4-for-21) with two runs and two RBI in nine games played.

Hughes died in McHenry, Illinois at age 47.

His older brother, Long Tom Hughes, also pitched for Chicago (NL) and Boston (AL). They were the first set of brothers to play for the Red Sox.
