= John O'Callaghan =

John O'Callaghan may refer to:

- John O'Callaghan (Medal of Honor) (1850–1899), American soldier and Medal of Honor recipient
- John O'Callaghan (politician) (died 1913), secretary of the United Irish League
- John O'Callaghan (musician), Irish musician and DJ
- Liam McCarthy and John D. O'Callaghan, BT Young Scientists of the Year and EU Young Scientists of the Year, 2009
- John Cornelius O'Callaghan (1805–1883), Irish historian and writer
- John Joseph O'Callaghan (1838–1905), Irish architect
- John O'Callaghan (singer), vocalist and guitarist of The Maine
- John O'Callaghan (American football) (born 1964), American football player in the 1987 Seattle Seahawks season

== See also ==
- John Callaghan (disambiguation)
