= John Callaghan =

John Callaghan may refer to:

- John Callaghan (physician) (1923–2004), Canadian cardiac surgeon
- John Callaghan (Galway), Irish murder victim
- John Callaghan (musician) (born 1969), British musician
- John Callaghan (screenwriter), see List of Republic of Doyle episodes
- John Callaghan (footballer), see List of Sheffield Wednesday F.C. players

== See also ==
- John Callahan (disambiguation)
- John O'Callaghan (disambiguation)
