= Norwood Gibson =

American baseball player (1877-1959)

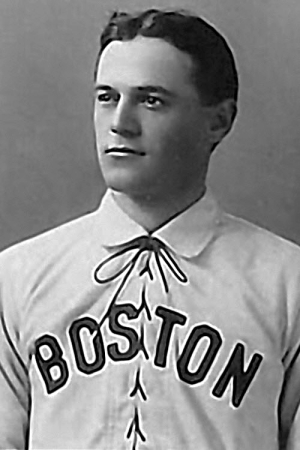
- Pitcher
- Born: March 11, 1877; Peoria, Illinois, U.S.
- Died: July 7, 1959 (aged 82); Peoria, Illinois, U.S.
- Batted: Right Threw: Right

MLB debut
- April 29, 1903, for the Boston Americans

Last MLB appearance
- May 18, 1906, for the Boston Americans

MLB statistics
- Win–loss record: 34–32
- Earned run average: 2.93
- Strikeouts: 258
- Stats at Baseball Reference

Teams
- Boston Americans (1903–1906)

Career highlights and awards
- World Series champion (1903)

Norwood Ringold Gibson [Gibby] (March 11, 1877 – July 7, 1959) was a starting pitcher in Major League Baseball who played his entire career for the Boston Americans between 1903 and 1906. Listed at 5 ft 10 in (1.78 m), 165 lb., Gibson batted and threw right-handed. A native of Peoria, Illinois, he went to college at the University of Notre Dame.

After college, he played for several minor league baseball teams and coached the Bradley Polytechnic Institute baseball team in 1901. During that time he was signed by the Cincinnati Reds but never got an opportunity to play an official game for the Reds. According to Sporting Life magazine, he did pitch an exhibition game for the Reds. In 1902 he pitched for the Kansas City Blue Stockings, managed by former Boston Beaneaters star pitcher Kid Nichols. He pitched two no-hitters for the Blue Stockings that season. After the season, apparently on Nichols' recommendation, Gibson was signed to a Major League contract by the Americans for $3000.

During his rookie 1903 season, Gibson was the fourth man of a Boston rotation that included Cy Young, Bill Dinneen, Long Tom Hughes, George Winter and Nick Altrock. He responded with a 13–9 mark, 76 strikeouts, and a 3.19 in 183 1/3 innings pitched. He thus won a World Series ring as a member of the Americans that won the first World Series that season, although Gibson did not play as Collins used only three pitchers, Young, Dineen and Hughes, for the entire series. His second season was much better, when he recorded 17 wins, 112 strikeouts, a 2.21 ERA and 273.0 innings, all career-highs, as his .592 winning percentage ranked him seventh between American League pitchers. The next two years, his playing time was limited by arm injuries. He retired after the 1906 season.

In a four-season career, Gibson posted a 34–32 record with 258 strikeouts and a 2.93 ERA in 85 appearances, including 72 starts, 56 complete games, three shutouts, 12 games finished, and 609.0 innings of work.

Gibson died in his homeland of Peoria, Illinois, at the age of 82.
