= Benny Bowcock =

American baseball player (1879-1961)

- Second baseman
- Born: October 28, 1879; Fall River, Massachusetts, U.S.
- Died: June 16, 1961 (aged 81); Taunton, Massachusetts, U.S.
- Batted: Right Threw: Right

MLB debut
- September 18, 1903, for the St. Louis Browns

Last MLB appearance
- September 28, 1903, for the St. Louis Browns

MLB statistics
- Batting average: .320
- Home runs: 1
- Runs batted in: 10
- Stats at Baseball Reference

Teams
- St. Louis Browns (1903)

Benjamin James Bowcock (October 28, 1879 – June 16, 1961) was an American Major League Baseball second baseman. He started the last fourteen games of the 1903 season for the St. Louis Browns, who were 65–74 and finished sixth in the American League. The 23-year-old rookie was a native of Fall River, Massachusetts.

All fourteen of Bowcock's games were played on the road. He made his major league debut in a September 18 doubleheader against the Philadelphia Athletics at Columbia Park. His last appearance was on September 28 against the Boston Americans at Huntington Avenue Grounds. The Browns won 5 and lost 9 while Bowcock was in the lineup, and he faced three Hall of Fame pitchers during that time: Chief Bender, Jack Chesbro, and Cy Young.

During his brief time in the big leagues he showed a strong bat and a weak glove. He was 16-for-50 (.320) with a slugging percentage of .480. He had 1 home run, 10 runs batted in, and 7 runs scored. At second base he made 7 errors in 61 total chances for a fielding percentage of .885, far below the league average of .943.
