= Ed Walker (baseball) =

English baseball player (1874-1947)

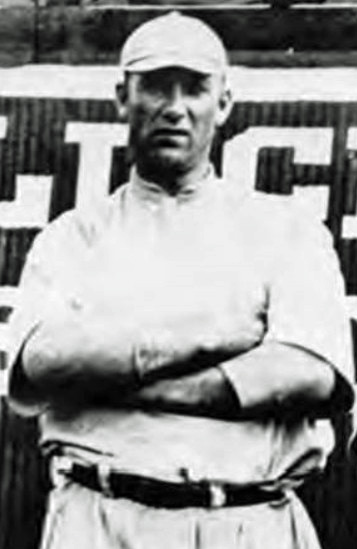
- Walker in 1910
- Pitcher
- Born: August 11, 1874; Cambois, England
- Died: September 29, 1947 (aged 73); Akron, Ohio, U.S.
- Batted: Left Threw: Left

MLB debut
- September 26, 1902, for the Cleveland Bronchos

Last MLB appearance
- June 21, 1903, for the Cleveland Naps

MLB statistics
- Win–loss record: 0–2
- Earned run average: 4.50
- Strikeouts: 5
- Stats at Baseball Reference

Teams
- Cleveland Bronchos/Naps (1902–1903)

Edward Harrison Walker (August 11, 1874 – September 29, 1947) was an English born Major League Baseball pitcher who played for two seasons. Born in Cambois, England, he played for the Cleveland Bronchos/Cleveland Naps during the 1902 Cleveland Bronchos season and the 1903 Cleveland Naps season, playing in four career games.
