= Ed Hilley =

American baseball player (1879–1956)

- Third baseman
- Born: June 17, 1879; Cleveland, Ohio, U.S.
- Died: November 14, 1956 (aged 77); Cleveland, Ohio, U.S.
- Batted: Right Threw: Right

MLB debut
- September 29, 1903, for the Philadelphia Athletics

Last MLB appearance
- September 29, 1903, for the Philadelphia Athletics

MLB statistics
- Batting average: .333
- Hits: 1
- Runs batted in: 0
- Stats at Baseball Reference

Teams
- Philadelphia Athletics (1903)

Edward Garfield Hilley (June 17, 1879 – November 14, 1956), nicknamed "Whitey", was an American Major League Baseball third baseman. He played for the Philadelphia Athletics during the 1903 season.
