= Claude Gouzzie =

French baseball player (1873–1907)

- Second baseman
- Born: 1873; France
- Died: September 21, 1907 (aged 33–34); Denver, Colorado
- Batted: Right Threw: Right

MLB debut
- July 22, 1903, for the St. Louis Browns

Last MLB appearance
- July 22, 1903, for the St. Louis Browns

MLB statistics
- Batting average: .000
- Home runs: 0
- Runs batted in: 0
- Stats at Baseball Reference

Teams
- St. Louis Browns (1903)

Claude Gouzzie (1873–1907) was a French second baseman in Major League Baseball. He played in one game for the St. Louis Browns of the American League on July 22, 1903. He was the first non-American citizen born in France to play major league baseball.
