= Pep Clark =

American baseball player (1883–1965)

- Third baseman
- Born: March 20, 1883; Union City, Ohio, U.S.
- Died: June 8, 1965 (aged 82); Milwaukee, Wisconsin, U.S.
- Batted: Right Threw: Right

MLB debut
- September 11, 1903, for the Chicago White Sox

Last MLB appearance
- September 28, 1903, for the Chicago White Sox

MLB statistics
- Batting average: .308
- Hits: 20
- Runs batted in: 9
- Stats at Baseball Reference

Teams
- Chicago White Sox (1903)

Harry "Pep" Clark (March 20, 1883 – June 8, 1965) was an American Major League Baseball third baseman. Clark played for the Chicago White Sox in 1903. In 15 career games, he had 20 hits in 65 at-bats. He batted and threw right-handed.

Clark was born in Union City, Ohio and died in Milwaukee, Wisconsin.
