= Willie Sudhoff =

American baseball player (1874–1917)

- Pitcher
- Born: September 17, 1874; St. Louis, Missouri, U.S.
- Died: May 25, 1917 (aged 42); St. Louis, Missouri, U.S.
- Batted: Right Threw: Right

MLB debut
- August 20, 1897, for the St. Louis Browns

Last MLB appearance
- June 16, 1906, for the Washington Senators

MLB statistics
- Win–loss record: 102–135
- Earned run average: 3.60
- Strikeouts: 516

Teams
- St. Louis Browns (1897–1898); Cleveland Spiders (1899); St. Louis Perfectos/Cardinals (1899–1901); St. Louis Browns (1902–1905); Washington Senators (1906)

John William (Wee Willie) Sudhoff (September 17, 1874 – May 25, 1917) was a starting pitcher in Major League Baseball who played in the National League for the St. Louis Browns (1897–1898), Cleveland Spiders (1899), St. Louis Perfectos (1899) and St. Louis Cardinals (1900–1901), and with the St. Louis Browns (1902–1905) and Washington Senators (1906) of the American League. Sudhoff batted and threw right-handed. He was born in St. Louis, Missouri.

Predictably, Sudhoff created a controversy when he jumped from the National League Cardinals to the American League Browns, becoming the first to play for all St. Louis clubs. At 5 ft 7 in (1.70 m), 165 lb he was a consistent pitcher who averaged 247 innings and 24 complete games in eight full seasons, with career-highs of 315 and 35 in 1898. He was at his best in 1903, going 21–15 with a 2.27 earned run average and five shutouts. His highlights include a pitching duel with Chief Bender of the Philadelphia Athletics in 1904, during ten innings, without either team scoring. The game ended in a scoreless tie after being suspended by poor light conditions.

In his ten-season career, Sudhoff had a 103–135 record with 520 strikeouts and a 3.56 ERA in 2086.1 innings.

After being in the St. Louis city sanitarium since August 1, 1913, Sudhoff died of paralysis on May 25, 1917.

== See also ==
- List of St. Louis Cardinals team records
- List of Major League Baseball career hit batsmen leaders
