= Jack O'Brien (outfielder) =

American baseball player (1873–1933)

- Outfielder
- Born: February 5, 1873; Watervliet, New York, U.S.
- Died: June 10, 1933 (aged 60); Watervliet, New York, U.S.
- Batted: Left Threw: Right

MLB debut
- April 14, 1899, for the Washington Senators

Last MLB appearance
- September 28, 1903, for the Boston Americans

MLB statistics
- Batting average: .259
- Home runs: 9
- Runs batted in: 133
- Stats at Baseball Reference

Teams
- Washington Senators (NL) (1899); Washington Senators (AL) (1901); Cleveland Blues (AL) (1901); Boston Americans (AL) (1903)

Career highlights and awards
- World Series champion (1903)

John Joseph O'Brien (February 5, 1873 – June 10, 1933) was an American outfielder in Major League Baseball. Between 1899 and 1903, O'Brien played with the Washington Senators in the National League (1899), and for the Washington Senators (1901), Cleveland Blues (1901), and Boston Americans (1903) of the American League. A native of Watervliet, New York, he batted left-handed and threw right-handed.

O'Brien spent part of two seasons with the Washington teams and Cleveland before moving to Boston. His most productive season came in 1899 as a rookie, he posted hit .282 and reached career-highs in home runs (6), RBI (51), runs (68), stolen bases (17) and games played (127). But he is best remembered as the first player to pinch-hit in a World Series game, when he struck out for Boston catcher Lou Criger in the 9th inning of Game One of the 1903 series against Pittsburgh. He was a .259 hitter in 326 games, including nine home runs with 133 RBI and 171 runs.

O'Brien died his homeland of Watervliet at the age of 60.
