= John Terry (baseball) =

American baseball player (1877–1958)

- Pitcher
- Born: September 4, 1877; Fairfax, Iowa
- Died: January 10, 1958 (aged 80); Cedar Rapids, Iowa
- Batted: Unknown Threw: Unknown

MLB debut
- September 17, 1902, for the Detroit Tigers

Last MLB appearance
- July 31, 1903, for the St. Louis Browns

MLB statistics
- Win–loss record: 1–2
- Earned run average: 2.78
- Strikeouts: 2
- Stats at Baseball Reference

Teams
- Detroit Tigers (1902); St. Louis Browns (1903)

John Baxter Terry (September 4, 1877 – January 10, 1958) was an American baseball pitcher and businessman.

Terry was born in 1877 on a farm in Fairfax, Iowa. He moved as a child to Cedar Rapids, Iowa, where he attended Washington High School.

He played Major League Baseball for the Detroit Tigers in 1902 and for the St. Louis Browns (1903). He appeared in four games (two as a starter), compiling a record of 1–2 in 22-2/3 innings pitched with an earned run average of 2.78. He died in 1958 in Cedar Rapids, Iowa.

In 1906, Terry founded an electrical supply company called J.B. Terry Company. The company became the Terry-Durin Company in 1909. He served as the company's president until his retirement in 1951.

Terry was married to Ada Alice Burnett in 1900. He died in Cedar Rapids at age 80 in 1958. He was buried at Cedar Memorial Park in Cedar Rapids.
