= Patsy Flaherty =

American baseball player (1876–1968)

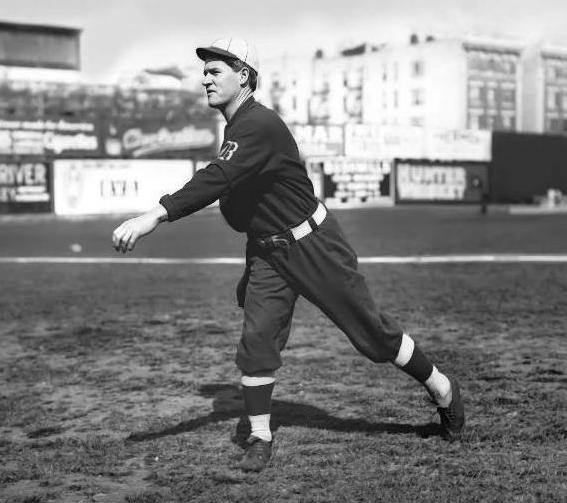
- Pitcher
- Born: June 29, 1876; Mansfield, Pennsylvania, U.S.
- Died: January 23, 1968 (aged 91); Alexandria, Louisiana, U.S.
- Batted: Left Threw: Left

MLB debut
- September 8, 1899, for the Louisville Colonels

Last MLB appearance
- September 14, 1911, for the Boston Rustlers

MLB statistics
- Win–loss record: 67–84
- Earned run average: 3.10
- Strikeouts: 271
- Stats at Baseball Reference

Teams
- Louisville Colonels (1899); Pittsburgh Pirates (1900); Chicago White Sox (1903–1904); Pittsburgh Pirates (1904–1905); Boston Doves (1907–1908); Philadelphia Phillies (1910); Boston Rustlers (1911)

Patrick Joseph Flaherty (June 29, 1876 – January 23, 1968), born in Mansfield (now Carnegie), Pennsylvania, was an American pitcher for the Louisville Colonels (1899), Pittsburgh Pirates (1900 and 1904–05), Chicago White Sox (1903–1904), Boston Doves (1907–08), Philadelphia Phillies (1910) and Boston Rustlers (1911), who specialized in his spitball.

He led the American League in hits allowed (338) and losses (25) in 1903. He led the National League in earned runs allowed (88) in 1908.

In 9 years Flaherty had a win–loss record of 67–84, 173 games, 150 games started, 125 complete games, 7 shutouts, 18 games finished, 2 saves, 1,302 2/3 innings pitched, 1,292 hits allowed, 616 runs allowed, 449 earned runs allowed, 25 home runs allowed, 331 walks allowed, 271 strikeouts, 56 hit batsmen, 25 wild pitches, 5,156 batters faced, 2 balks and a 3.10 ERA.

He died in Alexandria, Louisiana, at the age of 91 and is buried at Alexandria National Cemetery in Pineville, Louisiana.
