= Gus Dorner =

American baseball player (1876–1956)

- Pitcher
- Born: August 18, 1876; Chambersburg, Pennsylvania, U.S.
- Died: May 4, 1956 (aged 79); Chambersburg, Pennsylvania, U.S.
- Batted: Right Threw: Right

MLB debut
- September 17, 1902, for the Cleveland Bronchos

Last MLB appearance
- May 17, 1909, for the Boston Doves

MLB statistics
- Win–loss record: 35–69
- Earned run average: 3.37
- Strikeouts: 275
- Stats at Baseball Reference

Teams
- Cleveland Bronchos/Naps (1902–1903); Cincinnati Reds (1906); Boston Beaneaters/Doves (1906–1909)

Augustus Dorner (August 18, 1876 – May 4, 1956) was an American professional baseball player who played pitcher in the Major Leagues from 1902-1909. He played for the Boston Beaneaters, Cincinnati Reds, and Cleveland Naps.
