= John Callahan (catcher) =

American baseball player (1878–1952)

- Catcher
- Born: September 30, 1878; Philadelphia
- Died: June 20, 1952 (aged 73); Philadelphia
- Batted: Right Threw: Right

MLB debut
- September 29, 1903, for the Philadelphia Athletics

Last MLB appearance
- September 29, 1903, for the Philadelphia Athletics

MLB statistics
- Batting average: .000
- Games played: 1
- At bats: 5
- Stats at Baseball Reference

Teams
- Philadelphia Athletics (1903)

John Joseph Callahan (September 30, 1878 – June 20, 1952) was an American professional baseball catcher. He played in one game for the Philadelphia Athletics of Major League Baseball during the 1903 season. He went hitless in five at bats. He batted and threw right-handed.

== Life ==
Born in Philadelphia, Pennsylvania on September 30, 1878, Callahan became a catcher for the Major League Baseball team known as the Philadelphia Athletics, but played in just one game during the 1903 season. He died in Philadelphia on June 20, 1952, and was interred at the Holy Cross Cemetery in Yeadon, Pennsylvania.
