= Earl Moore =

American baseball player (1879–1961)

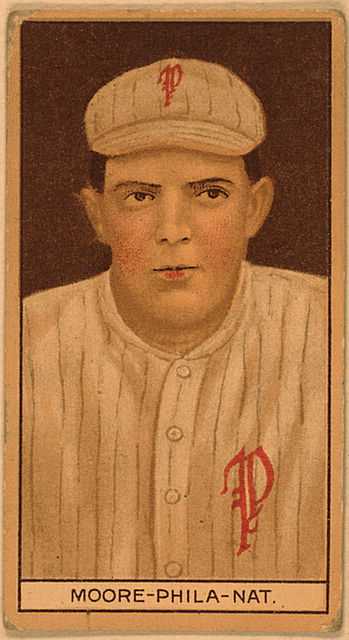
- Pitcher
- Born: July 29, 1877; Pickerington, Ohio, U.S.
- Died: November 28, 1961 (aged 84); Columbus, Ohio, U.S.
- Batted: Right Threw: Right

MLB debut
- April 25, 1901, for the Cleveland Blues

Last MLB appearance
- October 10, 1914, for the Buffalo Buffeds

MLB statistics
- Win–loss record: 162–154
- Earned run average: 2.78
- Strikeouts: 1,108
- Stats at Baseball Reference

Teams
- Cleveland Blues/Bronchos/Naps (1901–1907); New York Highlanders (1907); Philadelphia Phillies (1908–1913); Chicago Cubs (1913); Buffalo Buffeds (1914)

Career highlights and awards
- AL ERA leader (1903); NL strikeout leader (1910)

Earl Alonzo Moore (July 29, 1879 – November 28, 1961) was an American professional baseball pitcher who had a 14-year career in Major League Baseball.

== Biography ==
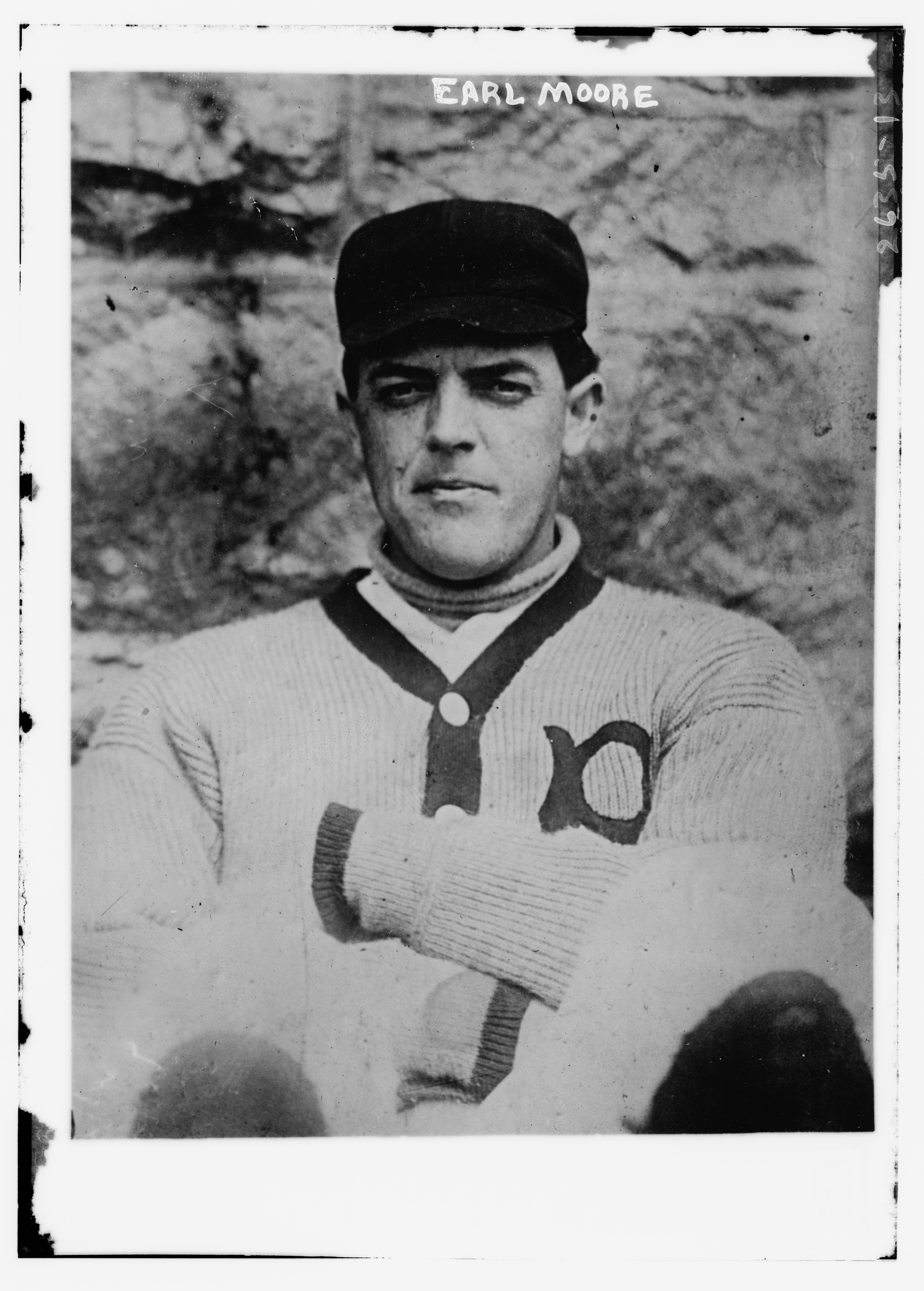
Moore in 1911

Moore's sidearm throwing style earned him the nickname "Crossfire". His contract was purchased by the Cleveland Blues from Dayton, Ohio, for $1000. On May 9, 1901, he pitched the American League's first no-hitter, only to lose the game in the tenth inning. He was also the first pitcher in the 20th century to lose a no-hit game. In 1903, he led the league with a 1.77 ERA, going 19–9.

He was traded to the New York Highlanders in 1907, and then to the Philadelphia Phillies in 1908. In 1908, he pitched 26 innings and did not allow an earned run. As of 2026, no other pitcher has thrown more than 25 innings in a season without allowing an earned run.

He won a career-high 22 games for the Phillies in 1910, leading the league in strikeouts. He lost 19 games the following year. In 1913, he was traded to the Chicago Cubs.

His career record was 161–154 with a 2.78 ERA. He pitched 230 complete games.

== See also ==
- List of Major League Baseball annual ERA leaders
- List of Major League Baseball annual strikeout leaders
- List of Major League Baseball career hit batsmen leaders
