= Weldon Henley =

American baseball player

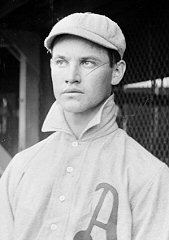
- Pitcher
- Born: October 25, 1880; Jasper, Georgia, U.S.
- Died: November 16, 1960 (aged 80); Palatka, Florida, U.S.
- Batted: Right Threw: Right

MLB debut
- April 23, 1903, for the Philadelphia Athletics

Last MLB appearance
- June 28, 1907, for the Brooklyn Dodgers

MLB statistics
- Win–loss record: 32-43
- Earned run average: 2.94
- Strikeouts: 309
- Stats at Baseball Reference

Teams
- Philadelphia Athletics (1903–1905); Brooklyn Superbas (1907)

Career highlights and awards
- Pitched a no-hitter on July 22, 1905

Weldon Henley (October 25, 1880 – November 16, 1960) was an American Major League Baseball pitcher from 1903 to 1907. He played for the Philadelphia Athletics and Brooklyn Dodgers.

Henley made his major league debut on April 23, 1903. He pitched a no-hitter against the St. Louis Browns in the first game of a doubleheader on July 22, 1905.

Henley was the first Georgia Tech alumnus to play in the Majors. His fraternity was Sigma Nu.

Preceded by Christy Mathewson	No-hitter pitcher July 22, 1905	Succeeded by Frank Smith
