= Joe Martin (outfielder) =

American baseball player (1876-1964)

- Outfielder/Infielder
- Born: January 1, 1876; Hollidaysburg, Pennsylvania, U.S.
- Died: May 25, 1964 (aged 88); Altoona, Pennsylvania, U.S.
- Batted: Left Threw: Right

MLB debut
- April 28, 1903, for the Washington Senators

Last MLB appearance
- August 31, 1903, for the St. Louis Browns

MLB statistics
- Batting average: .219
- Home runs: 0
- Runs batted in: 14
- Stats at Baseball Reference

Teams
- Washington Senators (1903); St. Louis Browns (1903)

Joseph Samuel Martin (January 1, 1876 – May 25, 1964) was an American outfielder who played in Major League Baseball.
