= Tom Hughes (pitcher, born 1878) =

American baseball player (1878–1956)

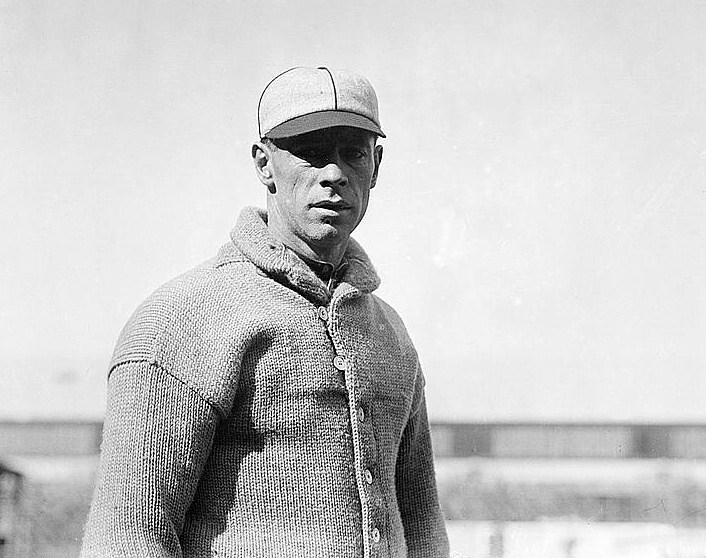
- Pitcher
- Born: November 29, 1878; Chicago, Illinois, U.S.
- Died: February 8, 1956 (aged 77); Chicago, Illinois, U.S.
- Batted: Right Threw: Right

MLB debut
- September 7, 1900, for the Chicago Orphans

Last MLB appearance
- October 3, 1913, for the Washington Senators

MLB statistics
- Win–loss record: 132–174
- Earned run average: 3.09
- Strikeouts: 1,368
- Stats at Baseball Reference

Teams
- Chicago Orphans (1900–1901); Baltimore Orioles (1902); Boston Americans (1902–1903); New York Highlanders (1904); Washington Senators (1904–1909, 1911–1913)

Career highlights and awards
- World Series champion (1903)

Thomas James Hughes (November 29, 1878 – February 8, 1956) was an American right-handed starting pitcher in Major League Baseball. From 1900 through 1913, Hughes played for the Chicago Orphans (1900–01), Baltimore Orioles (1902), Boston Americans (1902–03), New York Highlanders (1904) and Washington Senators (1904–09, 1911–13). He debuted on September 7, 1900, and played his final game on October 3, 1913. A native of Chicago, Hughes was nicknamed "Long Tom" for his height, a then-impressive 6 ft 1 in (1.85 m). His younger brother, Ed Hughes, also played for Chicago (NL) and Boston (AL), making them the first set of brothers to play for the Red Sox.

== Career ==
In 1901, Hughes completed 32 of his 35 starts for Chicago, including 308 1/3 innings pitched. Despite his 10–23 mark, in part due to low run support, he recorded a 3.24 earned run average while striking out 225 opponents, the third-best ever for a National League rookie. He jumped to the American League the following season, while dividing his playing time between Baltimore and Boston. In 1903, he became the third starter in the Boston rotation, behind Cy Young and Bill Dinneen. Hughes responded with a 20–7 mark and a 2.57 ERA, helping his team to clinch the AL title. He pitched in the inaugural World Series, losing Game Three.

Before the 1904 season, Hughes was sent to the Highlanders in exchange for Jesse Tannehill, an unpopular trade in Boston. Hughes came up short in New York and was traded to the Senators during the midseason. Again, he suffered low run support in 1905, when he went 17–20 with a 2.35 ERA. The next three seasons he averaged a 2.89 ERA, with a career-best 2.21 in 1908, and an 18–15 mark the same year.

On August 3, 1906, Hughes became the first pitcher in the modern era (1901 and later) to pitch a shutout and hit a home run that accounted for the only run in the game, when he hit a solo shot in the 10th inning off St. Louis Browns pitcher Fred Glade, at Sportsman's Park II, to give Washington a 1–0 victory. Since then, the feat has been matched only by Gene Packard (1915) in the Federal League, Red Ruffing (1932), Spud Chandler (1938) and Early Wynn (1959) in the American League, and Jim Bunning (1965), Juan Pizarro (1971), Bob Welch (1983), and Noah Syndergaard (2019) in the National League.

Hughes was sent to the Minneapolis Millers of the American Association in the 1909 midseason. In 1910, he topped the league with 31 wins (against 12 losses), a .721 winning percentage, and 222 strikeouts while pitching 326 innings. The next year he returned to Washington for his last three major league seasons.

In a 13-season career, Hughes posted a 132–174 record with 1368 strikeouts and a 3.09 ERA in 2644 innings, including 25 shutouts and 227 complete games.

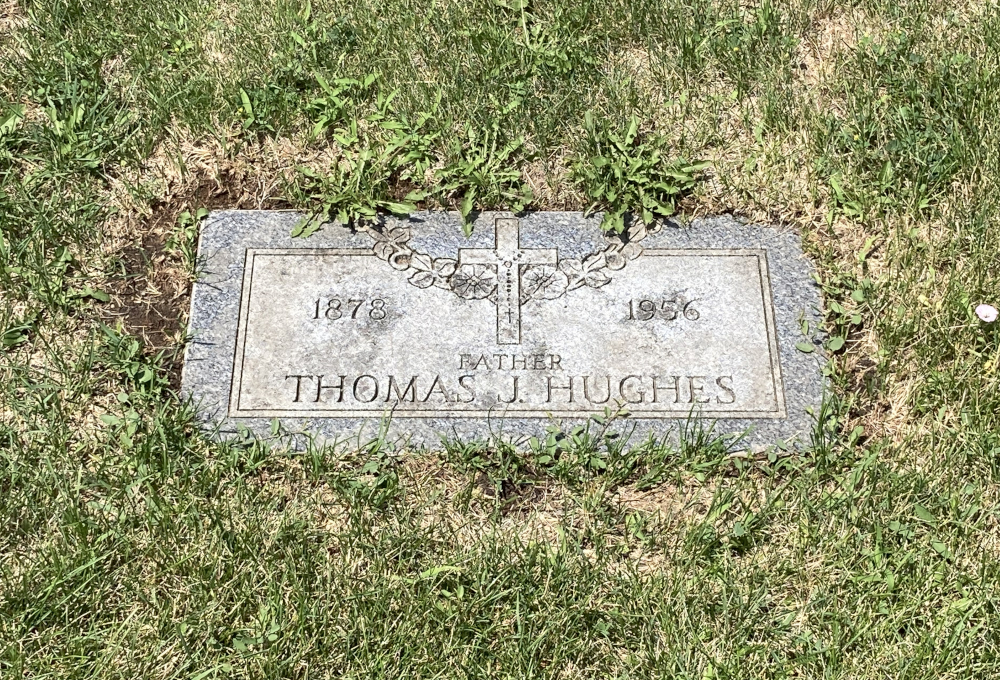
Hughes' grave at St. Joseph Cemetery

As a hitter, Hughes posted a .198 batting average (190-for-958) with 89 runs, 28 doubles, 15 triples, 6 home runs, 79 RBI, 8 stolen bases and 39 bases on balls.

Hughes retired from baseball in 1918. He died of pneumonia in Chicago in 1956, aged 77. He was buried at St. Joseph Cemetery in River Grove, Illinois.

== Career stats ==
G	GS	W	L	W-L%	ERA	CG	SHO	SV	IP	H	R	ER	BB	SO
399	313	132	174	.431	3.09	227	25	15	2644	2610	1292	902	853	1368

== See also ==
- List of Major League Baseball annual saves leaders
- List of Major League Baseball career hit batsmen leaders
