= Huntington Avenue Grounds =

Baseball stadium in Boston, Massachusetts, USA (1901-12)

Huntington Avenue American League Baseball Grounds
- Huntington Avenue Grounds
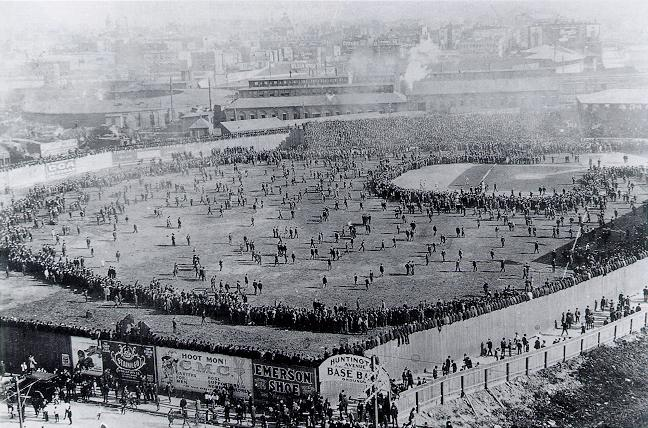
- Interactive map of Huntington Avenue American League Baseball Grounds
- Location: Boston, Massachusetts
- Coordinates: 42°20′20″N 71°5′20″W
- Owner: Boston Red Sox
- Capacity: 11,500
- Field size: Left Field – 350 feet (110 m); Left-Center – 440 feet (130 m); Center Field – 530 feet (160 m) (1901), 635 feet (194 m) (1908); Right Field – 280 feet (85 m) (1901), 320 feet (98 m) (1908); Backstop – 60 feet (18 m)

Construction
- Groundbreaking: March 9, 1901
- Opened: May 8, 1901
- Closed: After 1911 season
- Demolished: 1912

Tenant
- Boston Red Sox (MLB) (1901–1911)

Huntington Avenue Grounds was a baseball stadium in Boston, Massachusetts, and the first home field for the Boston Red Sox, known as the "Boston Americans" before 1908, from 1901 to 1911. The stadium, built for $35,000 (equivalent to $1.35 million in 2025), was on what is now Northeastern University, at the time across the New York, New Haven and Hartford Railroad tracks from the South End Grounds, home of the Boston Braves. The stadium was the site of the first World Series game between the modern American and National Leagues in 1903, and also saw the first perfect game in the modern era, thrown by Cy Young on May 5, 1904. The playing field was built on a former circus lot and was extremely large by modern standards - 530 feet (160 m) to center field, later expanded to 635 feet (194 m) in 1908. It had many quirks not seen in modern baseball stadiums, including patches of sand in the outfield where grass would not grow, and a tool shed in deep center field that was in play. The park was built on a large plot of land bounded by Huntington Avenue (northwest, left field); Rogers (now Forsyth) Street (southwest, third base); railroad tracks (southeast, first base); and various buildings to the east (right field).

The Huntington Avenue Grounds was demolished after the Red Sox left at the beginning of the 1912 season to play at Fenway Park. The Cabot Center, an indoor athletic venue belonging to Northeastern University, has stood on the Huntington Grounds' footprint since 1954. A plaque and a statue of Cy Young were erected in 1993 where the pitchers mound used to be, commemorating the history of this ballpark in what is now called World Series Way. Meanwhile, a plaque on the side of the Cabot Center (1956) marks the former location of the left field foul pole.

The Cabot facility itself was barely over a quarter mile away to the southwest from another Boston area sports facility of that era, Matthews Arena (built in 1910, demolished in 2026), the original home of the NHL's Boston Bruins when they started play in 1924.

== Gallery ==
An early diagram of the grounds

Plan of the grounds

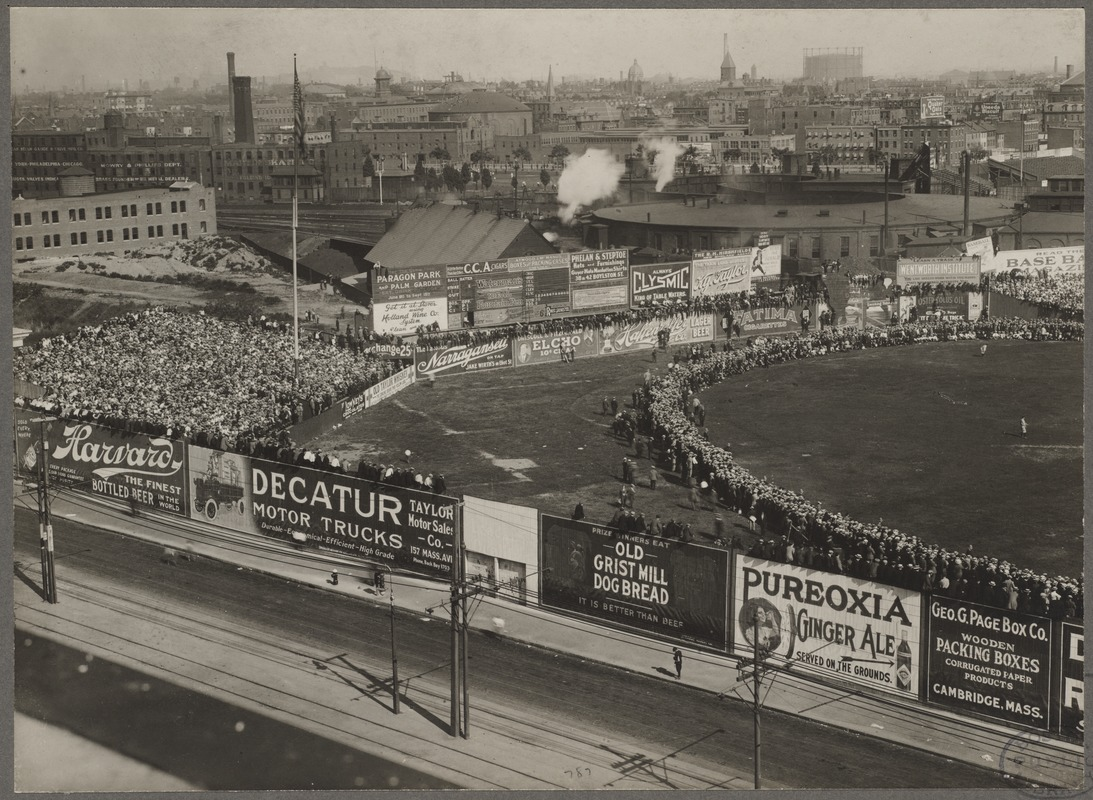
Huntington Avenue Grounds (left), August 5, 1911. Michael T. "Nuf Ced" McGreevy Collection, Boston Public Library

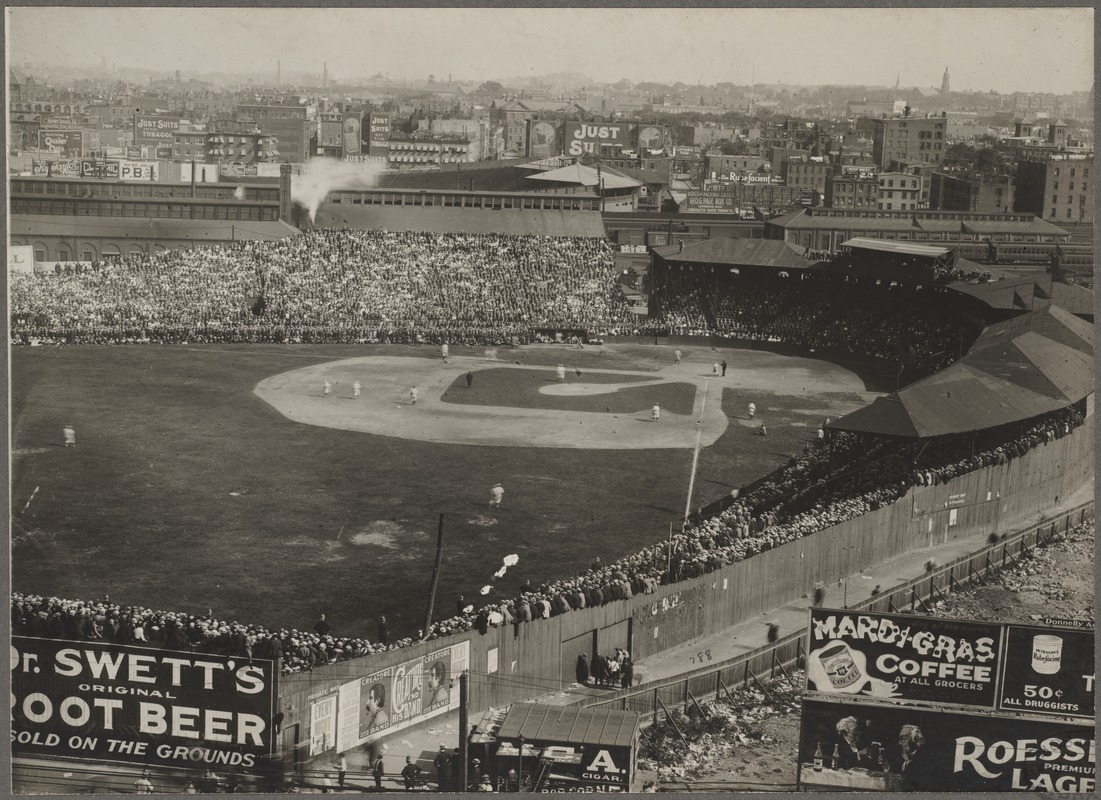
Huntington Avenue Grounds (right), August 5, 1911. Michael T. "Nuf Ced" McGreevy Collection, Boston Public Library

== See also ==
Preceded by first stadium	Home of the Boston Red Sox; 1901–1911	Succeeded by Fenway Park
