= Davey Dunkle =

American baseball player (1872–1941)

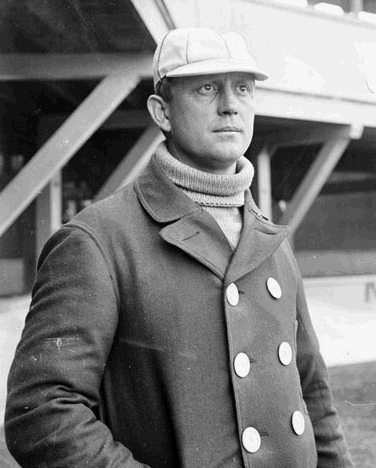
- Pitcher
- Born: August 30, 1872; Philipsburg, Pennsylvania, U.S.
- Died: November 19, 1941 (aged 69); Lock Haven, Pennsylvania, U.S.
- Batted: Switch Threw: Right

MLB debut
- August 28, 1897, for the Philadelphia Phillies

Last MLB appearance
- July 19, 1904, for the Washington Senators

MLB statistics
- Win–loss record: 17–30
- Earned run average: 5.02
- Strikeouts: 139
- Stats at Baseball Reference

Teams
- Philadelphia Phillies (1897–1898); Washington Senators (NL) (1899); Chicago White Sox (1903); Washington Senators (AL) (1903–1904)

Edward Perks "Davey" Dunkle (August 30, 1872 – November 19, 1941) was an American pitcher in Major League Baseball. He played all or parts of five seasons in the majors between 1897 and 1904, for the Philadelphia Phillies, National League's Washington Senators, Chicago White Sox, and American League's Washington Senators. Dunkle was 6 ft 2 in (1.88 m) tall and weighed 220 lbs.

== Career ==
Dunkle was born in Philipsburg, Pennsylvania. He started his professional baseball career in 1894 in the Pennsylvania State League. He then had short stints in the Virginia State League, Atlantic League, and Central Pennsylvania League before joining the Philadelphia Phillies in 1897. Dunkle made his major league debut on August 28. Over the last two months of the season, he started seven games for the Phillies, completed all seven, and went 5–2 with a 3.48 earned run average. It was the only MLB campaign in which he finished over .500; writer Bob Carroll later claimed that he "lost his effectiveness" after that year.

In 1898, Dunkle started the season 1–4 and then returned to the minors. He went 7–2 in the Eastern League during August and September. The following season, he split time between the National League's Senators and the Eastern League's Providence Grays, and he stayed with the Grays in 1900 and 1901. In 1901, Dunkle went 26–13 to lead the Eastern League in wins. He moved to the American Association's Louisville Colonels for 1902 and had another big year, pitching a total of 373 innings and going 30–10. He led the AA in wins, winning percentage, and innings.

Dunkle got another shot in the majors in 1903. He started the season with the American League's Chicago White Sox. After going 4–4, he was traded to the Washington Senators on July 20 and went 5–9 for them to finish out the year. In 1904, Dunkle won just 2 out of his 11 decisions, and he was sold back to the Louisville Colonels. He won 17 games in 1905 and 16 games in 1906 before retiring from professional baseball.

Dunkle returned to Pennsylvania after his playing days were over. He died in Lock Haven in 1941.
