= John Deering (baseball) =

American baseball player (1879–1943)

- Pitcher
- Born: June 25, 1879; Lynn, Massachusetts, U.S.
- Died: February 15, 1943 (aged 63); Beverly, Massachusetts, U.S.
- Batted: Right Threw: Right

MLB debut
- May 12, 1903, for the Detroit Tigers

Last MLB appearance
- September 25, 1903, for the New York Highlanders

MLB statistics
- Win–loss record: 7–7
- Earned run average: 3.80
- Strikeouts: 28
- Stats at Baseball Reference

Teams
- Detroit Tigers (1903); New York Highlanders (1903)

John Thomas Deering (June 25, 1879 – February 15, 1943) was an American Major League Baseball pitcher who played in 1903 with the Detroit Tigers and the New York Highlanders. He batted and threw right-handed.

He was born in Lynn, Massachusetts. After retiring from baseball, Deering became an employee of the Pope Lumber Company in Beverly, Massachusetts. He died on February 15, 1943 at the age of 62. He was buried at St. Mary's Cemetery in Beverly.
