= Ducky Holmes =

American baseball player (1869–1932)

- Image from Chicago Daily News negatives collection, Chicago History Museum.
- Outfielder
- Born: January 28, 1869; Des Moines, Iowa, U.S.
- Died: August 6, 1932 (aged 63); Truro, Iowa, U.S.
- Batted: Left Threw: Right

MLB debut
- August 8, 1895, for the Louisville Colonels

Last MLB appearance
- September 29, 1905, for the Chicago White Sox

MLB statistics
- Batting average: .282
- Home runs: 17
- Runs batted in: 375
- Stolen bases: 236
- Stats at Baseball Reference

Teams
- Louisville Colonels (1895–1897); New York Giants (1897); St. Louis Browns (1898); Baltimore Orioles (1898–1899); Detroit Tigers (1901–1902); Washington Senators (1903); Chicago White Sox (1903–1905)

James William "Ducky" Holmes (January 28, 1869 – August 6, 1932) was an American outfielder in Major League Baseball. He played ten seasons in the National League and American League with the Louisville Colonels (1895–97), New York Giants (1897), St. Louis Browns (1898), Baltimore Orioles (1898–99), Detroit Tigers (1901–02), Washington Senators (1903), and Chicago White Sox (1903–05). His minor league career included stops in Lincoln (1906–07) as player manager, Sioux City as player manager (1908–09), and as manager in Toledo (1910), Mobile (1911), Nebraska City (1912), Sioux City again (1912–13), Butte (1914), Lincoln (1916–17), Sioux City (1918), Beatrice (1922), and Fort Smith (1922). He was the player manager of the Western League Sioux City Packers playing alongside one time White Sox teammate Danny Green. Born in Des Moines, Iowa, he batted left-handed and threw right-handed.

Holmes spent his first two seasons with the Colonels and played the next two seasons with four clubs. After a season's absence, he returned to play in the American League's inaugural season in 1901. In 932 career games, Holmes batted .282 with 236 stolen bases and 1,014 hits.

== See also ==
- List of Major League Baseball career stolen bases leaders
