= Gene Wright (baseball) =

American baseball player (1878-1930)

- Pitcher
- Born: December 11, 1878; Cleveland, Ohio, U.S.
- Died: October 29, 1930 (aged 51); Barberton, Ohio, U.S.
- Batted: Right Threw: Right

MLB debut
- October 5, 1901, for the Brooklyn Superbas

Last MLB appearance
- April 18, 1904, for the St. Louis Browns

MLB statistics
- Win–loss record: 14–26
- Earned run average: 4.50
- Strikeouts: 140
- Stats at Baseball Reference

Teams
- Brooklyn Superbas (1901); Cleveland Bronchos/Naps (1902–1903); St. Louis Browns (1903–1904)

Clarence Eugene Wright (December 11, 1878 – October 29, 1930) was an American professional baseball pitcher. He played all or part of four seasons in Major League Baseball from 1901 to 1904.
