= Red Donahue =

American baseball player (1873–1913)

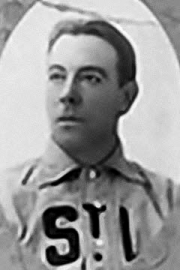
- Pitcher
- Born: January 23, 1873; Waterbury, Connecticut, U.S.
- Died: August 25, 1913 (aged 40); Philadelphia, Pennsylvania, U.S.
- Batted: Right Threw: Right

MLB debut
- May 6, 1893, for the New York Giants

Last MLB appearance
- September 28, 1906, for the Detroit Tigers

MLB statistics
- Win–loss record: 164–175
- Earned run average: 3.61
- Strikeouts: 787
- Stats at Baseball Reference

Teams
- New York Giants (1893); St. Louis Browns (NL) (1895–1897); Philadelphia Phillies (1898–1901); St. Louis Browns (1902–1903); Cleveland Naps (1903–1905); Detroit Tigers (1906)

Career highlights and awards
- Pitched a no-hitter on July 8, 1898

Francis Rostell "Red" Donahue (January 23, 1873 – August 25, 1913) was an American Major League Baseball pitcher from Waterbury, Connecticut, who played for 13 seasons both in the National League and the American League from 1893 through 1906.

== Career ==
Red broke into the Majors with the New York Giants in 1893, while still attending Villanova University. After finishing college in 1895, he appeared with the St. Louis Browns near the end of the season. On July 8, 1898, pitching for the Philadelphia Phillies, he no-hit the Boston Beaneaters at Philadelphia's National League Park. He lost 35 games during the 1897 season, still an MLB record.

== Post-career ==
Red died in Philadelphia at the age of 40, after succumbing to the effects of paralysis, and was interred at St. Joseph Cemetery in Waterbury, Connecticut.

== See also ==
- List of Major League Baseball career hit batsmen leaders
- List of Major League Baseball no-hitters
- List of St. Louis Cardinals team records

Achievements
Preceded by Jay Hughes	No-hitter pitcher July 8, 1898	Succeeded by Walter Thornton
