= 1904 Washington Senators season =

1904 Washington Senators
- League: American League
- Ballpark: National Park
- City: Washington, D.C.
- Record: 33–113 (.226)
- League place: 8th
- Owners: Thomas C. Noyes
- Managers: Malachi Kittridge and Patsy Donovan

The 1904 Washington Senators won 38 games, lost 113, and finished in eighth place in the American League. They were managed by Malachi Kittridge and Patsy Donovan and played home games at National Park. Their winning percentage of .252 is fourth worst for any MLB team since 1900.

== Regular season ==
=== Season standings ===
American League
Team	W	L	Pct.	GB	Home	Road
Boston Americans	95	59	.617	—	49‍–‍30	46‍–‍29
New York Highlanders	92	59	.609	1½	46‍–‍29	46‍–‍30
Chicago White Sox	89	65	.578	6	50‍–‍27	39‍–‍38
Cleveland Naps	86	65	.570	7½	44‍–‍31	42‍–‍34
Philadelphia Athletics	81	70	.536	12½	47‍–‍31	34‍–‍39
St. Louis Browns	65	87	.428	29	32‍–‍43	33‍–‍44
Detroit Tigers	62	90	.408	32	34‍–‍40	28‍–‍50
Washington Senators	38	113	.252	55½	23‍–‍52	15‍–‍61

=== Record vs. opponents ===
1904 American League record Sources:
Team	BOS	CWS	CLE	DET	NYH	PHA	SLB	WSH
Boston	—	13–9	9–13	16–6	12–10–2	13–9–1	12–10	20–2
Chicago	9–13	—	14–8	14–8–1	12–10–1	8–14	14–8	18–4
Cleveland	13–9	8–14	—	14–8–2	9–11–1	11–10	13–9	18–4
Detroit	6–16	8–14–1	8–14–2	—	7–15	10–12–1	11–11–2	12–8–4
New York	10–12–2	10–12–1	11–9–1	15–7	—	12–9	16–6	18–4
Philadelphia	9–13–1	14–8	10–11	12–10–1	9–12	—	11–10–1	16–6–1
St. Louis	10–12	8–14	9–13	11–11–2	6–16	10–11–1	—	11–10–1
Washington	2–20	4–18	4–18	8–12–4	4–18	6–16–1	10–11–1	—

=== Notable transactions ===
- July 20, 1904: Davey Dunkle was purchased from the Senators by the Louisville Colonels.

=== Roster ===
1904 Washington Senators
Roster
Pitchers: Davey Dunkle; Tom Hughes; Beany Jacobson; Del Mason; Casey Patten; Happy Townsend; Highball Wilson; Barney Wolfe; Catchers: Boileryard Clarke; Lew Drill; Malachi Kittridge	Infielders: Joe Cassidy; Bill Coughlin; Lefty Herring; Hunter Hill; Barry McCormick; Charles Moran; Jim Mullen; Rabbit Nill; Jake Stahl	Outfielders: Patsy Donovan; Izzy Hoffman; Frank Huelsman; Bill O'Neill; Al Orth; Kip Selbach; Jack Thoney	Manager: Malachi Kittridge; Patsy Donovan

== Player stats ==
=== Batting ===
==== Starters by position ====
Note: Pos = Position; G = Games played; AB = At bats; H = Hits; Avg. = Batting average; HR = Home runs; RBI = Runs batted in

Pos	Player	G	AB	H	Avg.	HR	RBI
C	Malachi Kittridge	81	265	64	.242	0	24
1B	Jake Stahl	142	520	136	.262	3	50
2B	Barry McCormick	113	404	88	.218	0	39
SS	Joe Cassidy	152	581	140	.241	1	33
3B	Hunter Hill	77	290	57	.197	0	17
OF	Frank Huelsman	84	303	75	.248	2	30
OF	Bill O'Neill	95	365	89	.244	1	16
OF	Patsy Donovan	125	436	100	.229	0	19

==== Other batters ====
Note: G = Games played; AB = At bats; H = Hits; Avg. = Batting average; HR = Home runs; RBI = Runs batted in

Player	G	AB	H	Avg.	HR	RBI
Boileryard Clarke	85	275	58	.211	0	17
Bill Coughlin	65	265	73	.275	0	17
Charles Moran	62	243	54	.222	0	7
Kip Selbach	48	178	49	.275	0	14
Lew Drill	46	142	38	.268	1	11
Jim Mullen	27	102	19	.186	0	4
Al Orth	31	102	22	.216	0	11
Jack Thoney	17	70	21	.300	0	6
Rabbit Nill	15	48	8	.167	0	3
Lefty Herring	15	46	8	.174	0	2
Izzy Hoffman	10	30	3	.100	0	1

=== Pitching ===
==== Starting pitchers ====
Note: G = Games pitched; IP = Innings pitched; W = Wins; L = Losses; ERA = Earned run average; SO = Strikeouts

Player	G	IP	W	L	ERA	SO
Casey Patten	45	357.2	14	23	3.07	150
Happy Townsend	36	291.1	5	26	3.58	143
Beany Jacobson	33	253.2	6	23	3.55	75
Barney Wolfe	17	126.2	6	10	3.27	44
Tom Hughes	16	124.1	2	13	3.47	48
Davey Dunkle	12	74.1	2	9	4.96	23
Highball Wilson	3	25.0	0	3	4.68	11

==== Other pitchers ====
Note: G = Games pitched; IP = Innings pitched; W = Wins; L = Losses; ERA = Earned run average; SO = Strikeouts

Player	G	IP	W	L	ERA	SO
Al Orth	10	73.2	3	4	4.76	23
Del Mason	5	33.0	0	3	6.00	16

== See also ==
- List of worst Major League Baseball season records
