= 1904 New York Highlanders season =

Baseball team season

1904 New York Highlanders
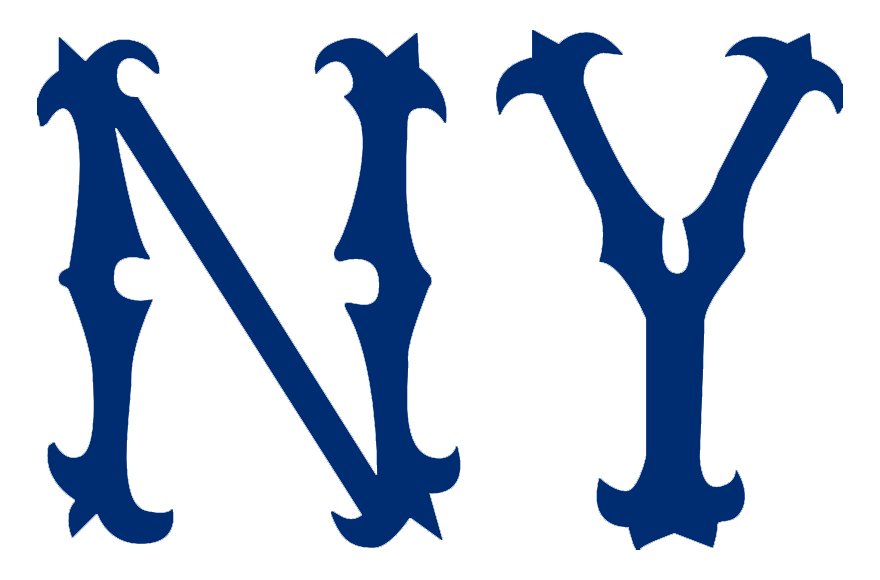
- League: American League
- Ballpark: Hilltop Park
- City: New York, New York
- Record: 92–59 (.609)
- League place: 2nd
- Owners: William Devery and Frank Farrell
- Managers: Clark Griffith

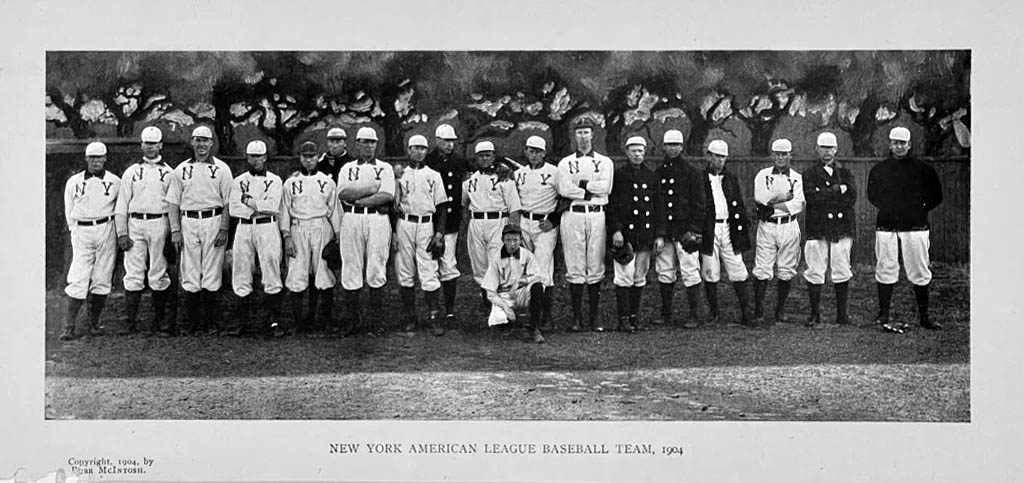
The team

The 1904 New York Highlanders season, the team's second, finished with the team in second place in the American League with a record of 92–59. The team was managed by Clark Griffith and played home games at Hilltop Park.

== Offseason ==
- October 6, 1903: Jack O'Connor was traded by the Highlanders to the St. Louis Browns for John Anderson.
- January 5, 1904: Eddie Quick and Jack Zalusky were traded by the Highlanders to the Toledo Mud Hens for Red Kleinow.

== Regular season ==
=== The name ===
The first verified use of the alternate nickname "Yankees" (a synonym for "Americans", the team being American Leaguers) occurred on April 7, 1904, when a spring training story from Richmond, Virginia carried the headline "Yankees Will Start Home From South To-Day." The New York Evening Journal screamed: "YANKEES BEAT BOSTON". The casual use of that nickname suggests it was already in the popular lexicon, although "Highlanders" would continue to be the primary (and equally unofficial) nickname for several more years.

=== Season summary ===
The Highlanders were in the thick of the American League pennant race throughout the season, leading by two games as late as September 20. This led to the New York Giants announcement that they would not play in the World Series, since they considered the Highlanders to be only a "minor league" team.

On the final day of the season at Hilltop Park, New York pitcher Jack Chesbro threw a wild pitch in the ninth inning, giving the Boston Americans the win, and the 1904 AL pennant. Even though it was Boston who stole the pennant on the final day, the Giants stuck to their word and their refusal prevented the World Series from being played.

It would be a century later, in 2004, the next time Boston directly eliminated the Yankees from title contention, when they did so in the final game of the 2004 ALCS, a hundred years later in a repeat of sorts of the events of that year, the beginning of a long rivalry between the two clubs.

=== Season standings ===
American League
Team	W	L	Pct.	GB	Home	Road
Boston Americans	95	59	.617	—	49‍–‍30	46‍–‍29
New York Highlanders	92	59	.609	1½	46‍–‍29	46‍–‍30
Chicago White Sox	89	65	.578	6	50‍–‍27	39‍–‍38
Cleveland Naps	86	65	.570	7½	44‍–‍31	42‍–‍34
Philadelphia Athletics	81	70	.536	12½	47‍–‍31	34‍–‍39
St. Louis Browns	65	87	.428	29	32‍–‍43	33‍–‍44
Detroit Tigers	62	90	.408	32	34‍–‍40	28‍–‍50
Washington Senators	38	113	.252	55½	23‍–‍52	15‍–‍61

=== Record vs. opponents ===
1904 American League record Sources:
Team	BOS	CWS	CLE	DET	NYH	PHA	SLB	WSH
Boston	—	13–9	9–13	16–6	12–10–2	13–9–1	12–10	20–2
Chicago	9–13	—	14–8	14–8–1	12–10–1	8–14	14–8	18–4
Cleveland	13–9	8–14	—	14–8–2	9–11–1	11–10	13–9	18–4
Detroit	6–16	8–14–1	8–14–2	—	7–15	10–12–1	11–11–2	12–8–4
New York	10–12–2	10–12–1	11–9–1	15–7	—	12–9	16–6	18–4
Philadelphia	9–13–1	14–8	10–11	12–10–1	9–12	—	11–10–1	16–6–1
St. Louis	10–12	8–14	9–13	11–11–2	6–16	10–11–1	—	11–10–1
Washington	2–20	4–18	4–18	8–12–4	4–18	6–16–1	10–11–1	—

=== Roster ===
1904 New York Highlanders
Roster
Pitchers: Jack Chesbro; Walter Clarkson; Ned Garvin; Clark Griffith; Tom Hughes; Al Orth; Jack Powell; Ambrose Puttmann; Barney Wolfe	Catchers: Red Kleinow; Deacon McGuire; Frank McManus; Infielders: Monte Beville; Wid Conroy; Kid Elberfeld; John Ganzel; Champ Osteen; Jack Thoney; Bob Unglaub; Jimmy Williams	Outfielders: John Anderson; Elmer Bliss; Orth Collins; Patsy Dougherty; Dave Fultz; Willie Keeler	Manager: Clark Griffith

== Player stats ==
=== Batting ===
==== Starters by position ====
Note: Pos = Position; G = Games played; AB = At bats; H = Hits; Avg. = Batting average; HR = Home runs; RBI = Runs batted in

Pos	Player	G	AB	H	Avg.	HR	RBI
C	Deacon McGuire	101	322	67	.208	0	20
1B	John Ganzel	130	465	121	.260	6	48
2B	Jimmy Williams	146	559	147	.263	2	74
3B	Wid Conroy	140	489	119	.243	1	52
SS	Kid Elberfeld	122	445	117	.263	2	46
OF	Willie Keeler	143	543	186	.343	2	40
OF	John Anderson	143	558	155	.278	3	82
OF	Patsy Dougherty	106	452	128	.283	6	22

==== Other batters ====
Note: G = Games played; AB = At bats; H = Hits; Avg. = Batting average; HR = Home runs; RBI = Runs batted in

Player	G	AB	H	Avg.	HR	RBI
Dave Fultz	97	339	93	.274	2	32
Red Kleinow	58	209	43	.206	0	16
Jack Thoney	36	128	24	.188	0	12
Champ Osteen	28	107	21	.196	2	9
Monte Beville	9	22	6	.273	0	2
Bob Unglaub	6	19	4	.211	0	2
Orth Collins	5	17	6	.353	0	1
Frank McManus	4	7	0	.000	0	0
Elmer Bliss	1	1	0	.000	0	0

=== Pitching ===
==== Starting pitchers ====
Note: G = Games pitched; IP = Innings pitched; W = Wins; L = Losses; ERA = Earned run average; SO = Strikeouts

Player	G	IP	W	L	ERA	SO
Jack Chesbro	55	454.2	41	12	1.82	239
Jack Powell	47	390.1	23	19	2.44	202
Al Orth	20	137.2	11	6	2.68	37
Tom Hughes	19	136.1	7	11	3.70	75
Clark Griffith	16	100.1	7	5	2.87	36
Ned Garvin	2	12.0	0	1	2.25	8

==== Other pitchers ====
Note: G = Games pitched; IP = Innings pitched; W = Wins; L = Losses; ERA = Earned run average; SO = Strikeouts

Player	G	IP	W	L	ERA	SO
Walter Clarkson	13	66.1	1	2	5.02	43
Ambrose Puttmann	9	49.1	2	0	2.74	26
Barney Wolfe	7	33.2	0	3	3.21	8

== Awards and honors ==
=== Records ===
- Jack Chesbro and Jack Powell, American League record, combined victories by two teammate pitchers (64)

==== Franchise records ====
- Jack Chesbro, Yankees single season record, most wins in a season (41)
