= 1904 St. Louis Browns season =

Major League Baseball season

1904 St. Louis Browns
- League: American League
- Ballpark: Sportsman's Park
- City: St. Louis, Missouri
- Record: 65–87 (.428)
- League place: 6th
- Owners: Robert Hedges
- Managers: Jimmy McAleer

The 1904 St. Louis Browns season was a season in American baseball. It was their third season based in St. Louis after their move from Milwaukee in 1901. The team finished sixth in the American League with a record of 65 wins and 87 losses, 29 games behind the Boston Americans.

== Offseason ==
- October 6, 1903: John Anderson was traded by the Browns to the New York Highlanders for Jack O'Connor.

== Regular season ==
=== Season standings ===
American League
Team	W	L	Pct.	GB	Home	Road
Boston Americans	95	59	.617	—	49‍–‍30	46‍–‍29
New York Highlanders	92	59	.609	1½	46‍–‍29	46‍–‍30
Chicago White Sox	89	65	.578	6	50‍–‍27	39‍–‍38
Cleveland Naps	86	65	.570	7½	44‍–‍31	42‍–‍34
Philadelphia Athletics	81	70	.536	12½	47‍–‍31	34‍–‍39
St. Louis Browns	65	87	.428	29	32‍–‍43	33‍–‍44
Detroit Tigers	62	90	.408	32	34‍–‍40	28‍–‍50
Washington Senators	38	113	.252	55½	23‍–‍52	15‍–‍61

=== Record vs. opponents ===
1904 American League record Sources:
Team	BOS	CWS	CLE	DET	NYH	PHA	SLB	WSH
Boston	—	13–9	9–13	16–6	12–10–2	13–9–1	12–10	20–2
Chicago	9–13	—	14–8	14–8–1	12–10–1	8–14	14–8	18–4
Cleveland	13–9	8–14	—	14–8–2	9–11–1	11–10	13–9	18–4
Detroit	6–16	8–14–1	8–14–2	—	7–15	10–12–1	11–11–2	12–8–4
New York	10–12–2	10–12–1	11–9–1	15–7	—	12–9	16–6	18–4
Philadelphia	9–13–1	14–8	10–11	12–10–1	9–12	—	11–10–1	16–6–1
St. Louis	10–12	8–14	9–13	11–11–2	6–16	10–11–1	—	11–10–1
Washington	2–20	4–18	4–18	8–12–4	4–18	6–16–1	10–11–1	—

=== Roster ===
1904 St. Louis Browns
Roster
Pitchers: Fred Glade; Harry Howell; Cy Morgan; Barney Pelty; Ed Siever; Willie Sudhoff; Gene Wright	Catchers: Mike Kahoe; Jack O'Connor; Joe Sugden; Infielders: Gene DeMontreville; Harry Gleason; Hunter Hill; Tom Jones; Charles Moran; Dick Padden; Bobby Wallace	Outfielders: Art Bader; Jesse Burkett; Emmet Heidrick; Charlie Hemphill; Frank Huelsman; Pat Hynes; Other batters: Pinky Swander; Harry Vahrenhorst	Manager: Jimmy McAleer

== Player stats ==
=== Batting ===
==== Starters by position ====
Note: Pos = Position; G = Games played; AB = At bats; H = Hits; Avg. = Batting average; HR = Home runs; RBI = Runs batted in

Pos	Player	G	AB	H	Avg.	HR	RBI
C	Joe Sugden	105	348	93	.267	0	30
1B	Tom Jones	156	625	152	.243	2	68
2B	Dick Padden	132	453	108	.238	0	36
3B	Charles Moran	82	272	47	.173	0	14
SS	Bobby Wallace	139	541	149	.275	2	69
OF	Jesse Burkett	147	575	156	.271	2	27
OF	Emmet Heidrick	133	538	147	.273	1	36
OF	Charlie Hemphill	114	438	112	.256	2	45

==== Other batters ====
Note: G = Games played; AB = At bats; H = Hits; Avg. = Batting average; HR = Home runs; RBI = Runs batted in

Player	G	AB	H	Avg.	HR	RBI
Pat Hynes	66	254	60	.236	0	15
Mike Kahoe	72	236	51	.216	0	12
Hunter Hill	58	219	47	.215	0	14
Harry Gleason	46	155	33	.213	0	6
Frank Huelsman	20	68	15	.221	0	1
Jack O'Connor	14	47	10	.213	0	2
Gene DeMontreville	4	9	1	.111	0	0
Art Bader	2	3	0	.000	0	0
Pinky Swander	1	1	0	.000	0	0
Harry Vahrenhorst	1	1	0	.000	0	0

=== Pitching ===
==== Starting pitchers ====
Note: G = Games pitched; IP = Innings pitched; W = Wins; L = Losses; ERA = Earned run average; SO = Strikeouts

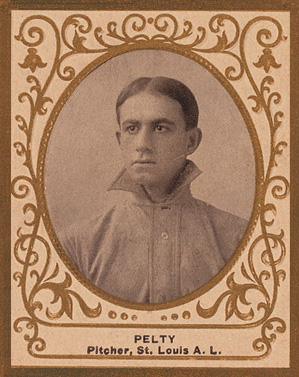
Barney Pelty

Player	G	IP	W	L	ERA	SO
Barney Pelty	39	301.0	15	18	2.84	126
Harry Howell	34	299.2	13	21	2.19	122
Fred Glade	35	289.0	18	15	2.27	156
Willie Sudhoff	27	222.1	8	15	3.76	63
Ed Siever	29	217.0	10	15	2.65	77

==== Other pitchers ====
Note: G = Games pitched; IP = Innings pitched; W = Wins; L = Losses; ERA = Earned run average; SO = Strikeouts

Player	G	IP	W	L	ERA	SO
Cy Morgan	8	51.0	0	2	3.71	24
Pat Hynes	5	26.0	1	0	6.23	6

==== Relief pitchers ====
Note: G = Games pitched; W = Wins; L = Losses; SV = Saves; ERA = Earned run average; SO = Strikeouts

Player	G	W	L	SV	ERA	SO
Gene Wright	1	0	1	0	13.50	3
