= 1904 Detroit Tigers season =

Major League Baseball season

1904 Detroit Tigers
- League: American League
- Ballpark: Bennett Park
- City: Detroit, Michigan
- Record: 62–90 (.408)
- League place: 7th
- Owners: William H. Yawkey
- Managers: Ed Barrow and Bobby Lowe

1904 was the fourth year for the Detroit Tigers in the American League. The team finished in seventh place with a record of 62–90 (.408), 32 games behind the Boston Americans. They played ten tie games, which is the major league record. The 1904 Tigers were outscored by their opponents 627 to 505. The team's attendance at Bennett Park was 177,796, seventh out of the eight teams in the AL. In the year before Ty Cobb's arrival, pitcher George Mullin had a higher batting average than any of the team's regulars at .290.

== Regular season ==
=== Season standings ===
American League
Team	W	L	Pct.	GB	Home	Road
Boston Americans	95	59	.617	—	49‍–‍30	46‍–‍29
New York Highlanders	92	59	.609	1½	46‍–‍29	46‍–‍30
Chicago White Sox	89	65	.578	6	50‍–‍27	39‍–‍38
Cleveland Naps	86	65	.570	7½	44‍–‍31	42‍–‍34
Philadelphia Athletics	81	70	.536	12½	47‍–‍31	34‍–‍39
St. Louis Browns	65	87	.428	29	32‍–‍43	33‍–‍44
Detroit Tigers	62	90	.408	32	34‍–‍40	28‍–‍50
Washington Senators	38	113	.252	55½	23‍–‍52	15‍–‍61

=== Record vs. opponents ===
1904 American League record Sources:
Team	BOS	CWS	CLE	DET	NYH	PHA	SLB	WSH
Boston	—	13–9	9–13	16–6	12–10–2	13–9–1	12–10	20–2
Chicago	9–13	—	14–8	14–8–1	12–10–1	8–14	14–8	18–4
Cleveland	13–9	8–14	—	14–8–2	9–11–1	11–10	13–9	18–4
Detroit	6–16	8–14–1	8–14–2	—	7–15	10–12–1	11–11–2	12–8–4
New York	10–12–2	10–12–1	11–9–1	15–7	—	12–9	16–6	18–4
Philadelphia	9–13–1	14–8	10–11	12–10–1	9–12	—	11–10–1	16–6–1
St. Louis	10–12	8–14	9–13	11–11–2	6–16	10–11–1	—	11–10–1
Washington	2–20	4–18	4–18	8–12–4	4–18	6–16–1	10–11–1	—

=== Roster ===
1904 Detroit Tigers
Roster
Pitchers: Bill Donovan; Cy Ferry; Charlie Jaeger; Ed Killian; Frank Kitson; George Mullin; Bugs Raymond; Jesse Stovall	Catchers: Monte Beville; Fritz Buelow; Lew Drill; Frank McManus; Bob Wood; Infielders: Jack Burns; Charlie Carr; Bill Coughlin; Ed Gremminger; Charlie Hickman; Bobby Lowe; Charley O'Leary; Rabbit Robinson	Outfielders: Jimmy Barrett; Sam Crawford; Frank Huelsman; Matty McIntyre	Manager: Ed Barrow; Bobby Lowe

== Player stats ==
=== Batting ===
==== Starters by position ====
Note: Pos = Position; G = Games played; AB = At bats; H = Hits; Avg. = Batting average; HR = Home runs; RBI = Runs batted in

Pos	Player	G	AB	H	Avg.	HR	RBI
C	Lew Drill	51	160	39	.244	0	13
1B	Charlie Carr	92	360	77	.214	0	40
2B	Bobby Lowe	140	506	105	.208	0	40
3B	Ed Gremminger	83	309	66	.214	1	28
SS	Charley O'Leary	135	456	97	.213	1	16
OF	Matty McIntyre	152	578	146	.253	2	46
OF	Jimmy Barrett	162	624	167	.268	0	31
OF	Sam Crawford	150	562	143	.254	2	73

==== Other batters ====
Note: G = Games played; AB = At bats; H = Hits; Avg. = Batting average; HR = Home runs; RBI = Runs batted in

Player	G	AB	H	Avg.	HR	RBI
Rabbit Robinson	101	320	77	.241	0	37
Bill Coughlin	56	206	47	.228	0	17
Bob Wood	49	175	43	.246	1	17
Monte Beville	54	174	36	.207	0	13
Charlie Hickman	42	144	35	.243	2	22
Fritz Buelow	42	136	15	.110	0	5
Frank Huelsman	4	18	6	.333	0	4
Jack Burns	4	16	2	.125	0	1
Frank McManus	1	0	0	----	0	0

Note: pitchers' batting statistics not included

=== Pitching ===
==== Starting pitchers ====
Note: G = Games pitched; IP = Innings pitched; W = Wins; L = Losses; ERA = Earned run average; SO = Strikeouts

Player	G	IP	W	L	ERA	SO
George Mullin	45	382.1	17	23	2.40	161
Bill Donovan	34	293.0	17	16	2.46	137
Ed Killian	40	257.2	14	20	2.44	124
Frank Kitson	26	199.2	8	13	3.07	38
Jesse Stovall	22	60.2	3	12	4.42	41
Charlie Jaeger	8	49.0	3	3	2.57	13

==== Other pitchers ====
Note: G = Games pitched; IP = Innings pitched; W = Wins; L = Losses; ERA = Earned run average; SO = Strikeouts

Player	G	IP	W	L	ERA	SO
Bugs Raymond	5	14.2	0	1	3.07	7
Cy Ferry	3	13.0	0	1	6.23	4

== Awards and honors ==
=== League top five finishers ===
Jimmy Barrett

- AL leader in bases on balls (79)
- AL leader in times on base (249)
- AL leader in games (162)
- AL leader in plate appearances (714)
- #2 in AL in singles (152)
- #4 in AL in at bats (624)
- #5 in AL in outs (465)

Bill Donovan

- #3 in AL in bases on balls allowed (94)
- #5 in AL in wild pitches (11)

Ed Killian

- #4 in AL in bases on balls allowed (93)
- #4 in AL in games finished (6)
- #5 in AL in hit batsmen (17)

Frank Kitson

- #5 in AL in home runs allowed (7)

Bobby Lowe

- 3rd oldest player in the AL (38)

Matty McIntyre

- #3 in AL in sacrifice hits (28)

George Mullin

- AL leader in bases on balls allowed (131)
- #2 in AL in complete games (42)
- #2 in AL in hits allowed (345)
- #2 in AL in batters faced (1597)
- #3 in AL in shutouts (7)
- #3 in AL in losses (23)
- #4 in AL in games (45)
- #4 in AL in innings pitched (382.1)
- #4 in AL in games started (44)
- #5 in AL in earned runs allowed (102)

Bob Wood

- 4th oldest player in the AL (38)
