= 1904 Boston Americans season =

Major League Baseball season

1904 Boston Americans
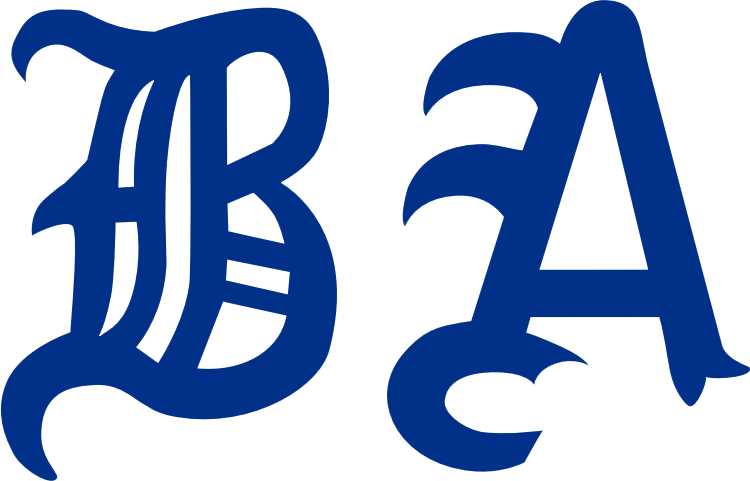
- League: American League
- Ballpark: Huntington Avenue Grounds
- City: Boston, Massachusetts
- Record: 95–59 (.617)
- League place: 1st
- Owners: Henry Killilea
- Managers: Jimmy Collins
- Stats: ESPN.com; Baseball Reference

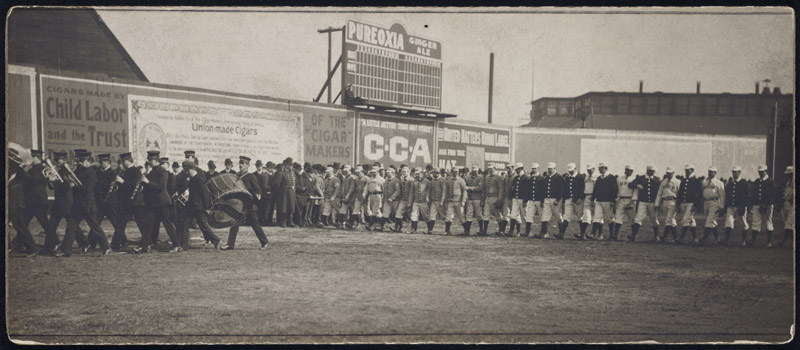
Opening day ceremonies at the Huntington Avenue Grounds in celebration of the 1903 World Series championship by the Americans.

The 1904 Boston Americans season was the fourth season for the professional baseball franchise that later became known as the Boston Red Sox. The Americans finished first in the American League (AL) with a record of 95 wins and 59 losses, 1 1/2 games ahead of the New York Highlanders. The team was managed by Jimmy Collins and played its home games at Huntington Avenue Grounds. The Americans were set to play the National League (NL) champion New York Giants in the 1904 World Series; however, the Giants refused to play.

== Offseason ==
=== Transactions ===
- December 7, 1903: It is reported that the Boston Americans will trade catcher Jake Stahl to the Washington Senators.
- December 23, 1903: The Boston Americans trade pitcher Tom Hughes to the New York Highlanders for pitcher Jesse Tannehill.

Prior to the regular season, the team held spring training in Macon, Georgia.

== Regular season ==
- April 14: The regular season opens with an 8–2 loss to the New York Highlanders at Hilltop Park in New York City.
- April 18: In the home opener, the Americans defeat the visiting Washington Senators, 5–0.
- May 5: Cy Young throws the first no-hitter in franchise history; it was also a perfect game. The Americans beat the Philadelphia Athletics by a score of 3–0 in Boston.
- June 12: In their longest game of the season, the Americans defeat the St. Louis Browns, 2–1 in 16 innings, at Sportsman's Park in St. Louis.
- June 18: The team's highest scoring game of the season ends as a 13–10 win in 11 innings, on the road against the Chicago White Sox.
- August 17: Jesse Tannehill throws a no-hitter against the White Sox at South Side Park in Chicago.
- October 10: The regular season ends with a doubleheader on the road against the Highlanders; Boston won the first game, 3–2, while New York won the second game, 1–0 in 10 innings.

=== Statistical leaders ===
The offense was led by Buck Freeman, who hit 7 home runs and had 84 RBIs, and Freddy Parent with a .291 batting average. The pitching staff was led by Cy Young, who made 43 appearances (41 starts) and pitched 40 complete games with a 26–16 record and 1.97 ERA, while striking out 200 in 380 innings. The team had two other 20-game winners; Bill Dinneen (23–14) and Jesse Tannehill (21–11).

=== Season standings ===
American League
Team	W	L	Pct.	GB	Home	Road
Boston Americans	95	59	.617	—	49‍–‍30	46‍–‍29
New York Highlanders	92	59	.609	1½	46‍–‍29	46‍–‍30
Chicago White Sox	89	65	.578	6	50‍–‍27	39‍–‍38
Cleveland Naps	86	65	.570	7½	44‍–‍31	42‍–‍34
Philadelphia Athletics	81	70	.536	12½	47‍–‍31	34‍–‍39
St. Louis Browns	65	87	.428	29	32‍–‍43	33‍–‍44
Detroit Tigers	62	90	.408	32	34‍–‍40	28‍–‍50
Washington Senators	38	113	.252	55½	23‍–‍52	15‍–‍61

The team had three games end in a tie; September 13 at Philadelphia, September 14 vs. New York, and September 15 vs. New York. Both ties against New York were the second games of doubleheaders. Tie games are not counted in league standings, but player statistics during tie games are counted.

=== Record vs. opponents ===
1904 American League record Sources:
Team	BOS	CWS	CLE	DET	NYH	PHA	SLB	WSH
Boston	—	13–9	9–13	16–6	12–10–2	13–9–1	12–10	20–2
Chicago	9–13	—	14–8	14–8–1	12–10–1	8–14	14–8	18–4
Cleveland	13–9	8–14	—	14–8–2	9–11–1	11–10	13–9	18–4
Detroit	6–16	8–14–1	8–14–2	—	7–15	10–12–1	11–11–2	12–8–4
New York	10–12–2	10–12–1	11–9–1	15–7	—	12–9	16–6	18–4
Philadelphia	9–13–1	14–8	10–11	12–10–1	9–12	—	11–10–1	16–6–1
St. Louis	10–12	8–14	9–13	11–11–2	6–16	10–11–1	—	11–10–1
Washington	2–20	4–18	4–18	8–12–4	4–18	6–16–1	10–11–1	—

=== Opening Day lineup ===
Patsy Dougherty	LF
Jimmy Collins	3B
Chick Stahl	CF
Buck Freeman	RF
Freddy Parent	SS
Candy LaChance	1B
Hobe Ferris	2B
Lou Criger	C
Cy Young	P

=== Roster ===
1904 Boston Americans
Roster
Pitchers: Bill Dinneen; Norwood Gibson; Jesse Tannehill; George Winter; Cy Young	Catchers: Lou Criger; Tom Doran; Duke Farrell; Infielders: Jimmy Collins; Hobe Ferris; Candy LaChance; Freddy Parent; Bob Unglaub	Outfielders: Patsy Dougherty; Buck Freeman; Bill O'Neill; Kip Selbach; Chick Stahl	Manager: Jimmy Collins

== Player stats ==
=== Batting ===
Note: Stats in brackets are derived from Retrosheet which differ from the stats found on MLB.com.

==== Starters by position ====
Note: Pos=Position; GP=Games played; AB=At bats; R=Runs; H=Hits; 2B=Doubles; 3B=Triples; HR=Home runs; RBI=Runs batted in; BB=Walks; AVG=Batting average; OBP=On base percentage; SLG=Slugging percentage

Pos	Player	GP	AB	R	H	2B	3B	HR	RBI	BB	AVG	OBP	SLG	Reference
C	Lou Criger	98	299	34	63	10	5	2	34	27 (28)	.211	.283 (.285)	.298	
1B	Candy LaChance	157	573 (572)	55	130	19	5	1	47	23	.227	.265 (.267)	.283	
2B	Hobe Ferris	156	563 (566)	50	120	23	10	3	63	23 (21)	.213 (.212)	.245 (.241)	.306 (.304)	
SS	Freddy Parent	155	591 (593)	85	172 (173)	22	9	6	77	28 (26)	.291 (.292)	.330 (.328)	.389 (.390)	
3B	Jimmy Collins	156	631 (632)	85	171	33	13	3	67	27	.271	.306	.379 (.378)	
RF	Buck Freeman	157	597 (599)	64	167	20	19	7	84	32 (31)	.280 (.279)	.329 (.327)	.412 (.411)	
LF	Kip Selbach	98	376	50	97	19	8	0	30	49	.258	.348	.351	
CF	Chick Stahl	157	588	83	170	27	19	3	67	65	.289	.367	.415	

==== Other batters ====
Note: Pos=Position; GP=Games played; AB=At bats; R=Runs; H=Hits; 2B=Doubles; 3B=Triples; HR=Home runs; RBI=Runs batted in; BB=Walks; AVG=Batting average; OBP=On base percentage; SLG=Slugging percentage

Pos	Player	GP	AB	R	H	2B	3B	HR	RBI	BB	AVG	OBP	SLG	Reference
C	Duke Farrell	68	198	11	42	9	2	0	15	14	.212	.278	.278	
LF	Patsy Dougherty	49	195	33	53	5	4	0	4	25	.272	.357	.338	
IF/OF	Bill O'Neill	17	52	7	10	1	0	0	5	1	.192	.208	.212	
C	Tom Doran	12	32	1	4	0	1	0	0	4	.125	.243	.188	
IF	Bob Unglaub	9	13	1	2	1	0	0	2	1	.154	.214	.231	

==== Pitchers ====
Note: GP=Games played; AB=At bats; R=Runs; H=Hits; 2B=Doubles; 3B=Triples; HR=Home runs; RBI=Runs batted in; BB=Walks; AVG=Batting average; OBP=On base percentage; SLG=Slugging percentage

Player	GP	AB	R	H	2B	3B	HR	RBI	BB	AVG	OBP	SLG	Reference
Cy Young	43	148	14	33	3	3	1	10	0	.223	.223	.304	
Jesse Tannehill	45	122	14	24	2	6	0	6	10	.197	.258	.311	
Bill Dinneen	37	120	9	25	0	1	0	9	5	.208	.252	.225	
Norwood Gibson	33	92	5	6	0	0	0	2	9	.065	.149	.065	
George Winter	24	44	7	5	0	0	0	0	5	.114	.204	.114	

=== Pitching ===
==== Starting pitchers ====
Note: GP=Games Played; GS=Games Started; IP=Innings Pitched; H=Hits; BB=Walks; R=Runs; ER=Earned Runs; SO=Strikeouts; W=Wins; L=Losses; SV=Saves; ERA=Earned Run Average

Player	GP	GS	IP	H	BB	R	ER	SO	W	L	SV	ERA	Reference
Cy Young	43	41	380	327	29	104	83	200	26	16	1	1.97	
Bill Dinneen	37	37	335 2/3	283	66	115	82	153	23	14	0	2.20	
Jesse Tannehill	33	31	281 2/3	256	33	89	64	116	21	11	0	2.04	
Norwood Gibson	33	32	273	216	81	111	67	112	17	14	0	2.21	
George Winter	20	16	135 2/3	126	27	47	35	3	8	4	0	2.32	
