= 1904 Philadelphia Athletics season =

1904 Philadelphia Athletics
- League: American League
- Ballpark: Columbia Park
- City: Philadelphia
- Record: 81–70 (.536)
- League place: 5th
- Owners: Benjamin Shibe, Tom Shibe, John Shibe, Connie Mack, Sam Jones, Frank Hough
- Managers: Connie Mack

The 1904 Philadelphia Athletics season involved the Athletics finishing fifth in the American League with a record of 81 wins and 70 losses.

== Preseason ==
=== 1904 Philadelphia City Series ===
The Athletics played eight games against the Philadelphia Phillies for the local championship in the pre-season city series. The Athletics defeated the Phillies, 5 games to 3.

The series was to have opened on April 2, 1904 at the Phillies’ Philadelphia Ball Park but was called off due to wet grounds. The game scheduled for April 9, 1904 at the Phillies’ park was canceled due to rain.

AL Philadelphia Athletics (5) vs. NL Philadelphia Phillies (3)

Game	Date	Score	Location	Time	Attendance
1	April 4, 1904	Philadelphia Phillies – 1, Philadelphia Athletics – 0	Columbia Park	1:25	8,641
2	April 5, 1904	Philadelphia Phillies – 2, Philadelphia Athletics – 4	Columbia Park	1:38	3,701
3	April 6, 1904	Philadelphia Phillies – 6, Philadelphia Athletics – 14	Columbia Park	-	2,643
4	April 7, 1904	Philadelphia Athletics – 4, Philadelphia Phillies – 6	Philadelphia Ball Park	-	3,142
5	April 8, 1904	Philadelphia Athletics – 2, Philadelphia Phillies – 4	Philadelphia Ball Park	1:35	2,311
6	April 11, 1904	Philadelphia Phillies – 0, Philadelphia Athletics – 2	Columbia Park	1:25	1,046
7	April 12, 1904	Philadelphia Athletics – 4, Philadelphia Phillies – 3	Philadelphia Ball Park	1:40	1,379
8	April 13, 1904	Philadelphia Phillies – 8, Philadelphia Athletics – 3	Columbia Park	1:30	714

Following the 1904 series, the Athletics and Phillies had each won 10 of the twenty games played in the local championship in 1903 and 1904,

== Regular season ==
- May 5, 1904: Cy Young threw the first no hitter in the history of the American League's Boston franchise against the Athletics. It was also a perfect game. The Americans beat the Athletics by a score of 3–0.

=== Season standings ===
American League
Team	W	L	Pct.	GB	Home	Road
Boston Americans	95	59	.617	—	49‍–‍30	46‍–‍29
New York Highlanders	92	59	.609	1½	46‍–‍29	46‍–‍30
Chicago White Sox	89	65	.578	6	50‍–‍27	39‍–‍38
Cleveland Naps	86	65	.570	7½	44‍–‍31	42‍–‍34
Philadelphia Athletics	81	70	.536	12½	47‍–‍31	34‍–‍39
St. Louis Browns	65	87	.428	29	32‍–‍43	33‍–‍44
Detroit Tigers	62	90	.408	32	34‍–‍40	28‍–‍50
Washington Senators	38	113	.252	55½	23‍–‍52	15‍–‍61

=== Record vs. opponents ===
1904 American League record Sources:
Team	BOS	CWS	CLE	DET	NYH	PHA	SLB	WSH
Boston	—	13–9	9–13	16–6	12–10–2	13–9–1	12–10	20–2
Chicago	9–13	—	14–8	14–8–1	12–10–1	8–14	14–8	18–4
Cleveland	13–9	8–14	—	14–8–2	9–11–1	11–10	13–9	18–4
Detroit	6–16	8–14–1	8–14–2	—	7–15	10–12–1	11–11–2	12–8–4
New York	10–12–2	10–12–1	11–9–1	15–7	—	12–9	16–6	18–4
Philadelphia	9–13–1	14–8	10–11	12–10–1	9–12	—	11–10–1	16–6–1
St. Louis	10–12	8–14	9–13	11–11–2	6–16	10–11–1	—	11–10–1
Washington	2–20	4–18	4–18	8–12–4	4–18	6–16–1	10–11–1	—

=== Roster ===
1904 Philadelphia Athletics
Roster
Pitchers: Fred Applegate; John Barthold; Chief Bender; Andy Coakley; Jim Fairbank; Weldon Henley; Eddie Plank; Rube Waddell	Catchers: Pete Noonan; Doc Powers; Ossee Schreckengost; Infielders: Lave Cross; Monte Cross; Harry Davis; Jim Mullen; Danny Murphy	Outfielders: Lou Bruce; Topsy Hartsel; Danny Hoffman; Ollie Pickering; Socks Seybold	Manager: Connie Mack

== Player stats ==
=== Batting ===
==== Starters by position ====
Note: Pos = Position; G = Games played; AB = At bats; H = Hits; Avg. = Batting average; HR = Home runs; RBI = Runs batted in

Pos	Player	G	AB	H	Avg.	HR	RBI
C	Ossee Schreckengost	95	311	58	.186	1	21
1B	Harry Davis	102	404	125	.309	10	62
2B	Danny Murphy	150	557	160	.287	7	77
SS	Monte Cross	153	503	95	.189	1	38
3B	Lave Cross	155	607	176	.290	1	71
OF	Topsy Hartsel	147	534	135	.253	2	25
OF	Ollie Pickering	124	455	103	.226	0	30
OF	Socks Seybold	143	510	149	.292	3	64

==== Other batters ====
Note: G = Games played; AB = At bats; H = Hits; Avg. = Batting average; HR = Home runs; RBI = Runs batted in

Player	G	AB	H	Avg.	HR	RBI
Danny Hoffman	53	204	61	.299	3	24
Doc Powers	57	184	35	.190	0	11
Pete Noonan	39	114	23	.202	2	13
Jim Mullen	41	110	24	.218	1	9
Lou Bruce	30	101	27	.267	0	8

=== Pitching ===
==== Starting pitchers ====
Note: G = Games pitched; IP = Innings pitched; W = Wins; L = Losses; ERA = Earned run average; SO = Strikeouts

Player	G	IP	W	L	ERA	SO
Rube Waddell	46	383.0	25	19	1.62	349
Eddie Plank	44	357.1	26	17	2.17	201
Weldon Henley	36	295.2	15	17	2.53	130
Chief Bender	29	203.2	10	11	2.87	149
Andy Coakley	8	62.0	4	3	1.89	33
Fred Applegate	3	21.0	1	2	6.43	12

==== Other pitchers ====
Note: G = Games pitched; IP = Innings pitched; W = Wins; L = Losses; ERA = Earned run average; SO = Strikeouts

Player	G	IP	W	L	ERA	SO
Jim Fairbank	3	17.0	0	1	6.35	6

==== Relief pitchers ====
Note: G = Games pitched; W = Wins; L = Losses; SV = Saves; ERA = Earned run average; SO = Strikeouts

Player	G	W	L	SV	ERA	SO
John Barthold	4	0	0	0	5.06	5
Lou Bruce	2	0	0	0	4.91	2
