= Pinky Swander =

American baseball player (1880-1944)

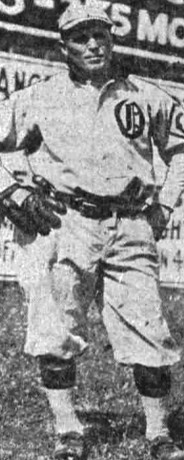
- Right fielder
- Born: July 4, 1880; Portsmouth, Ohio, U.S.
- Died: October 24, 1944 (aged 64); Springfield, Massachusetts, U.S.
- Batted: Left Threw: Left

MLB debut
- September 18, 1903, for the St. Louis Browns

Last MLB appearance
- April 14, 1904, for the St. Louis Browns

MLB statistics
- Batting average: .269
- Home runs: 0
- Runs batted in: 6
- Stats at Baseball Reference

Teams
- St. Louis Browns (1903–1904)

Edward Ottis "Pinky" Swander (July 4, 1880 – October 24, 1944) was an American Major League Baseball outfielder. He played parts of two seasons in the majors for the St. Louis Browns. He played 14 games as a right fielder in 1903, then made one appearance as a pinch hitter in 1904. His minor league baseball career spanned fifteen seasons, from 1901 until 1915.

== Sources ==
- Career statistics from Baseball Reference · Baseball Reference (Minors) · Retrosheet · Baseball Almanac
