= Art Bader =

American baseball player (1886-1957)

- Outfielder
- Born: September 21, 1886; St. Louis, Missouri, U.S.
- Died: April 5, 1957 (aged 70); St. Louis, Missouri, U.S.
- Batted: Right Threw: Right

MLB debut
- August 2, 1904, for the St. Louis Browns

Last MLB appearance
- August 3, 1904, for the St. Louis Browns

MLB statistics
- Games played: 2
- At bats: 3
- Hits: 0
- Stats at Baseball Reference

Teams
- St. Louis Browns (1904)

Arthur Herman Bader (September 21, 1886 – April 15, 1957) was an American Major League Baseball player. Bader played for the St. Louis Browns in the 1904 season. In two games, he had no hits in three at-bats, playing the outfield. He batted and threw right-handed.

Bader was born and died in St. Louis, Missouri.
