= 1904 in baseball =

The following are the baseball events of the year 1904 throughout the world.

== Champions ==
- American League: Boston Americans
- National League: New York Giants

World Series: New York (NL) declined challenge by Boston (AL)

== Statistical leaders ==
	American League		National League	
Stat	Player	Total	Player	Total
AVG	Nap Lajoie (CLE)	.376	Honus Wagner (PIT)	.349
HR	Harry Davis (PHA)	10	Harry Lumley (BRO)	9
RBI	Nap Lajoie (CLE)	102	Bill Dahlen (NYG)	80
W	Jack Chesbro^{1} (NYH)	41	Joe McGinnity (NYG)	35
ERA	Addie Joss (CLE)	1.59	Joe McGinnity (NYG)	1.61
K	Rube Waddell (PHA)	349	Christy Mathewson (NYG)	212

^{1} Modern (1901–present) single-season wins record

== Major league baseball final standings ==
=== American League final standings ===
American League
Team	W	L	Pct.	GB	Home	Road
Boston Americans	95	59	.617	—	49‍–‍30	46‍–‍29
New York Highlanders	92	59	.609	1½	46‍–‍29	46‍–‍30
Chicago White Sox	89	65	.578	6	50‍–‍27	39‍–‍38
Cleveland Naps	86	65	.570	7½	44‍–‍31	42‍–‍34
Philadelphia Athletics	81	70	.536	12½	47‍–‍31	34‍–‍39
St. Louis Browns	65	87	.428	29	32‍–‍43	33‍–‍44
Detroit Tigers	62	90	.408	32	34‍–‍40	28‍–‍50
Washington Senators	38	113	.252	55½	23‍–‍52	15‍–‍61

Locations of teams for the 1904–1907 American League seasons
American League

=== National League final standings ===
National League
Team	W	L	Pct.	GB	Home	Road
New York Giants	106	47	.693	—	56‍–‍26	50‍–‍21
Chicago Cubs	93	60	.608	13	49‍–‍27	44‍–‍33
Cincinnati Reds	88	65	.575	18	49‍–‍27	39‍–‍38
Pittsburgh Pirates	87	66	.569	19	48‍–‍30	39‍–‍36
St. Louis Cardinals	75	79	.487	31½	39‍–‍36	36‍–‍43
Brooklyn Superbas	56	97	.366	50	31‍–‍44	25‍–‍53
Boston Beaneaters	55	98	.359	51	34‍–‍45	21‍–‍53
Philadelphia Phillies	52	100	.342	53½	28‍–‍43	24‍–‍57

Locations of teams for the 1903–1906 National League seasons
National League

== Events ==
=== January ===
- January 4 – The New York Highlanders of the American League announce plans to play on Sundays at Ridgewood Park in Queens, NY, but the National League Brooklyn Superbas object the proposal. By the time Sunday's games are legal only in the cities of Detroit, St. Louis, Chicago and Cincinnati.

=== February ===
- February 29 – Pepper Martin is born in Temple, Oklahoma. Amazingly, with more than 19,000 different Major League Baseball players in the sport's history, between 1836 and 2018, only 11 have been born on a Leap Day. Dubbed as the Wild Horse of the Osage because of his daring and aggressive baserunning abilities, Martin played as a third baseman and an outfielder for the St. Louis Cardinals in a span of 13 seasons between 1928 and 1944, earning two World Series titles, four All-Star Game selections and four National League stolen bases titles. But Martin is probably best known for his heroics in the 1931 World Series, when he led the Cardinals in average (.500), hits (12), doubles (4), runs (5), RBI (5), stolen bases (5) and added one home run in the seven-game triumph over the highly favored Philadelphia Athletics, making also a running catch to cut a ninth-inning rally by the Athletics in the decisive Game 7.

=== March ===
- March 16 – Buddy Myer is born in Ellisville, Mississippi. A two-time All-Star and American League champion bat, Myer was the second baseman of the Washington Senators club when they won their last AL pennant in 1933. He posted a .330/.389/.406 slash line with 2,131 hits in 1,923 games. Notably, Myer walked more than twice as many times as he struck out (965-to-428) during 17 seasons from 1925 through 1941, including a stint with the Boston Red Sox in 1927 and 1928. Myer was often cited as one of the few Jewish baseball stars and was chosen for the International Jewish Sports Hall of Fame, but he was a member of the Baptist church.

=== May ===
- May 5 – Cy Young pitches a perfect game, as the Boston Americans defeat the Philadelphia Athletics, 3–0, at Huntington Avenue Grounds. This is considered the first perfect game in the modern era.
- May 11 – Following his perfect game against the Philadelphia Athletics six days before, Cy Young of the Boston Americans pitched another six hitless innings against the Detroit Tigers, until Sam Crawford stroked a single to end the string. Before his perfection start, Young had already pitched eighth consecutive innings without allowing a base hit. On April 25, he pitched two innings at Philadelphia, then he hurled six innings in relief against the Washington Senators. As a result, the record books credited Young with 23 consecutive hitless innings based on these four games, which is considered a record in Major League Baseball history. No one has ever equaled that mark.
- May 21 – Boston Americans shortstop Bill O'Neill made history when he committed six errors in a 13-inning, 5–3 loss to the St. Louis Browns at Huntington Avenue Grounds, to set a 20th-century single-game record.
- May 27 – New York Giants first baseman Dan McGann set a Major League Baseball record with five stolen bases in a single-game, a feat not matched until Davey Lopes did it for the Los Angeles Dodgers in 1974, and not surpassed until Atlanta Braves' Otis Nixon stole six bases in 1991.
- May 30 – Frank Chance of the Chicago Cubs is hit by a pitch five times in a doubleheader against the Cincinnati Reds, by Jack Harper and Win Kellum.

=== June ===
- June 11 – Chicago Cubs pitcher Bob Wicker pitches nine innings without allowing a hit. He surrenders a hit in the 10th inning, but it would be the only hit he allows in the game. The Cubs would go on the beat the New York Giants, 1–0, in 12 innings.
- June 20 – Duff Cooley of the Boston Beaneaters hits for the cycle in the second game of a doubleheader against the Philadelphia Phillies in a 9–0 Boston victory.
- June 23 – Kip Selbach of the Washington Senators ties a record by committing 3 errors from the outfield in one inning.

=== July ===
- July 16 – New York Highlanders right-handed starter Jack Chesbro steals home plate in the bottom of the 10th inning, scoring a walk-off run while winning his own game against the Detroit Tigers, 9–8, at Hilltop Park. Chesbro, who entered the game in relief duties, led off the inning with a single, moved to third base on a pair of outs, then achieved this rare feat. Chesbro, a notorious spitballer, set a Major League pitching record with 41 wins in 1904.

=== August ===
- August 17 – Boston Americans pitcher Jesse Tannehill tosses a no-hitter against the Chicago White Sox in a 6–0 win at South Side Park.
- August 24 – New York Highlanders left fielder Willie Keeler collects two home runs against the visiting St. Louis Browns in a 9–1 win at Hilltop Park. Both drives are inside-the-park.

=== September ===
- September 1 – The New York Giants selected Moonlight Graham in the Rule five draft. This is the same Moonlight Graham that is fictionalized in the movie Field of Dreams.
- September 5 – At the Polo Grounds, the New York Giants swept a doubleheader from the Boston Beaneaters in front of 37,000 fans. Christy Mathewson won a pitching duel with Kaiser Wilhelm in the opener, 1–0, when Jim Delahanty scored on a triple by Tom Needham in the bottom of the ninth inning. The second game of the Labor Day twin-bill was won on a Sam Mertes single in the bottom of the ninth that brought Red Ames with the winning run. The climax to the successful day inspired a group of fans to carry Giants manager John McGraw off the field on their shoulders; McGraw was dropped during the excitement and suffered a sprained ankle.

=== October ===
- October 3 – Christy Mathewson of the New York Giants strikes out 16 in a 3–1 victory over the St. Louis Cardinals at Polo Grounds. His 16 strikeouts set a new record in the major leagues as he finishes the game in one hour and 15 minutes.
- October 4 – New York Giants outfielder Sam Mertes hits for the cycle in a 7–3 loss to the St. Louis Cardinals at Polo Grounds.
- October 7 – George Stovall hit a home run off his brother Jesse Stovall. That particular feat was a Major League first and an event that remained unduplicated until Rick Ferrell hit a homer off Wes Ferrell in 1933; later, Joe Niekro went deep against Phil Niekro in 1976.
- October 8 – Jack Chesbro earned his 41st victory of the season as the New York Highlanders defeated the Boston Americans, 3–2. The 41 wins by a pitcher in a season are a modern record in Major League history. Previously, the future Hall of Famer won his 14th consecutive game on August 10 (a record at the time), pitched 30 consecutive complete games at a time, and would complete 48 of his 51 starts of the season.
- October 10 – The regular season ends with a doubleheader at Hilltop Park in New York City. The Boston Americans clinched the American League pennant in the opener with a 3–2 victory over the New York Highlanders, while New York won the second game, 1–0, in 10 innings. It would also be the last time for a full century that the Boston AL team, who would later formally become the Boston Red Sox in 1908, would beat the New York AL team in a pennant-deciding game.

==== Postseason ====
- The World Series was cancelled due to a business rivalry between the two leagues. During spring training, New York Giants owner John T. Brush said that there will never be a series between two clubs based in the same city, in response to a preseason offer from New York Highlanders co-owner Frank J. Farrell. Nevertheless, the Boston Americans pennant victory over the Highlanders had historical significance in several ways. Although Boston had won instead, Brush and team's manager John McGraw refused to face the Americans in what would've been the second World Series. Brush announced, "There is nothing in the constitution or playing rules of the National League which requires its victorious club to submit its championship honors to a contest with a victorious club in a minor league," according to his biography at SABR. The resulting backlash by the press caused Brush to take a stance and lead the committee to formalize the rules governing the future World Series. This would be the last time for 90 years that a World Series was not played, when it was canceled on September 14 of 1994 due to an MLB Players Association strike. It would also be the last time for 100 years that the Boston AL team, who would later formally become the Boston Red Sox in 1908, would beat the New York AL team in a pennant-deciding game until the 2004 American League Championship Series.

== Births ==
=== January ===
- January 1 – Ethan Allen
- January 3 – Bill Cissell
- January 7 – Clay Roe
- January 10 – Lou Dials
- January 13 – Bunny Hearn
- January 16 – Jo-Jo Morrissey
- January 18 – Len Koenecke
- January 19 – Jimmy Boyle
- January 20 – Denny Sothern
- January 22 – John Milligan
- January 24 – Neal Finn
- January 26 – George Blaeholder
- January 28 – Dutch Hoffman
- January 29 – Ray Hayworth

=== February ===
- February 7 – Andy Reese
- February 9 – Roy Mahaffey
- February 10 – Hal Anderson
- February 13 – Cecil Bolton
- February 13 – Charlie Fitzberger
- February 15 – Oscar Estrada
- February 27 – Chick Fullis
- February 27 – Bud Teachout
- February 29 – Pepper Martin

=== March ===
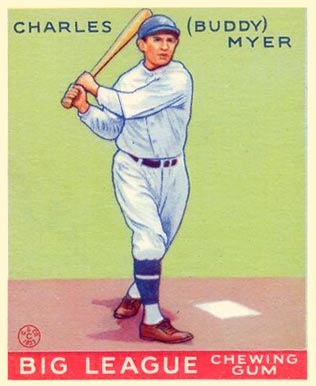
All Star Buddy Myer

- March 5 – Lou Rosenberg
- March 16 – Buddy Myer
- March 21 – Frank Sigafoos
- March 21 – Red Rollings
- March 22 – Bob Elson
- March 30 – Ripper Collins
- March 31 – Sam Dailey
- March 31 – Red Rollings

=== April ===
- April 1 – Jack Cummings
- April 9 – Guy Cantrell
- April 9 – Fred Frankhouse
- April 11 – Dutch Ussat
- April 30 – Neal Baker
- April 30 – Tony Murray

=== May ===
- May 9 – Paul Hinson
- May 9 – Brad Springer
- May 16 – Abe White
- May 18 – Red Smith
- May 20 – Pete Appleton
- May 22 – Ed Morgan
- May 25 – Buz Phillips
- May 26 – Frank Ragland
- May 26 – Bill Shores

=== June ===
- June 4 – Lefty Atkinson
- June 7 – Dusty Boggess
- June 12 – Bill Foster
- June 13 – John O'Connell
- June 15 – Ed Pipgras
- June 15 – Pid Purdy
- June 15 – Hank Winston
- June 24 – Bobby Reeves

=== July ===
- July 2 – Pete Susko
- July 3 – Luke Hamlin
- July 4 – Ed Cotter
- July 4 – Mel Ingram
- July 5 – Bump Hadley
- July 9 – Art Daney
- July 14 – Max West
- July 15 – Ray Wolf
- July 18 – Marty Karow
- July 19 – Mark Koenig
- July 26 – Bill Dreesen

=== August ===
- August 5 – Vic Frazier
- August 6 – Herb Cobb
- August 14 – Les Cox
- August 17 – Augie Walsh

=== September ===
- September 4 – Bud Morse
- September 6 – Willie Underhill
- September 10 – Arlie Tarbert
- September 16 – Edgar Barnhart
- September 25 – Paul Hopkins
- September 26 – Jess Cortazzo
- September 30 – Johnny Allen

=== October ===
- October 2 – Tom Angley
- October 5 – Sam West
- October 7 – Chuck Klein
- October 9 – Gordon Slade
- October 13 – Howie Carter
- October 15 – Bill Lewis
- October 16 – Boom-Boom Beck
- October 24 – Harry Smythe
- October 25 – Andy Cohen
- October 26 – Monk Sherlock
- October 27 – Frank Bennett
- October 28 – Liz Funk
- October 28 – Joe O'Rourke
- October 31 – Allyn Stout

=== November ===
- November 1 – Johnny Burnett
- November 4 – Earl Mattingly
- November 5 – Ollie Sax
- November 15 – George Cox
- November 16 – Mike Smith
- November 19 – Elmer Tutwiler
- November 24 – Billy Rogell

=== December ===
- December 5 – Ray Fitzgerald
- December 12 – Ray Boggs
- December 13 – Bill Windle
- December 16 – Joe Berry
- December 20 – Spud Davis
- December 23 – Howie Williamson
- December 25 – Bill Akers
- December 25 – Lloyd Brown
- December 27 – John Shea
- December 29 – Bill Sweeney

== Deaths ==
=== January–March ===
- January 1 – George Radbourn, 47, pitcher who played briefly for the 1883 Detroit Wolverines.
- January 31 – Dan Mahoney, 39, catcher and first baseman for the 1892 Cincinnati Reds and 1894 Washington Senators.
- March 22 – Art McCoy, 39, second baseman who played in two games with the 1889 Washington Nationals.
- March 25 – Harry Arundel, 49, pitcher who played with the Brooklyn Atlantics (1875), Pittsburgh Alleghenys (1892) and Providence Grays (1884).
- March 28 – George Seward, 53 [?], outfielder who played in part of three seasons for the St. Louis Brown Stockings (1875, 1882) and New York Mutuals (1876).
- March 31 – Nathan Menderson, 83, executive with the Cincinnati Red Stockings of the American Association

=== April–June ===
- April 11 – Shorty Fuller, 36, shortstop for the Washington Nationals, St. Louis Brown Stockings and New York Giants from 1888 to 1896, who scored more than 100 runs in the 1890 and 1891 seasons.
- April 18 – Charlie Ziegler, 29, infielder for the 1889 Cleveland Spiders and 1900 Philadelphia Phillies.
- April 20 – John Galvin, 61, second baseman for the 1872 Brooklyn Atlantics.
- April 20 – Gus McGinnis, 33, pitcher and outfielder who played with the Chicago Colts and Philadelphia Phillies in 1he 1893 season.
- April 27 – Bobby Cargo, 33, shortstop for the 1892 Pittsburgh Pirates.
- May 4 – Frank Quinlan, 35, catcher and outfielder who appeared in two games for the 1891 Boston Reds.
- May 25 – John Hayes, 49, outfielder who hit .143 in five games for the 1876 New York Mutuals.
- June 3 – Bill Pfann, 41 [?], pitcher for the 1884 Cincinnati Reds.
- June 6 – Chippy McGarr, 41, third baseman who hit .269 in 827 games for several teams over the course of 10 seasons from 1884 to 1896.
- June 19 – Marshall Quinton, 52, catcher who played from 1884 to 1885 for the Richmond Virginians and Philadelphia Athletics teams of the American Association.

=== July–September ===
- July 24 – Ernie Mason, 34 [?], pitcher and outfielder for the 1894 St. Louis Browns of the National League.
- August 22 – Charlie Dewald, 36, pitcher for the 1890 Cleveland Infants.
- September 20 – Jack Neagle, 46, pitcher for the Cincinnati Reds, Philadelphia Quakers, Baltimore Orioles and Pittsburgh Alleghenys from 1879 to 1884.

=== October–December ===
- October 16 – Mike Slattery, 37, center fielder who hit .251 in five seasons and was a member of the New York Giants World Champion teams of 1888 and 1889.
- October 25 – Cornelius Van Cott, 66, owner of the New York Giants from January 1893 to January 1895.
- October 28 – Sam Field, 56, catcher who hit .146 for three different teams between 1875 and 1876.
- November 2 – Henry Austin, 60, outfielder and a .243 batter in 23 games for the 1873 Elizabeth Resolutes.
- November 4 – Charlie Reilley, 47 [?], catcher who hit .210 from 1879 through 1884 for the Troy Trojans, Cincinnati Reds, Detroit Wolverines, Worcester Ruby Legs and Boston Reds.
- November 4 – Jim Shanley, 50, outfielder who played two games for the 1876 New York Mutuals.
- November 7 – Fred Carroll, 40, catcher and outfielder from 1884 to 1891, who hit a career .284 average in 754 games with the Columbus Buckeyes and for the Pittsburgh teams Alleghenys/Pirates and Burghers.
- November 20 – Dell Darling, 42, catcher and a career .240 hitter for three teams of three different leagues from 1887 to 1891.
- December 13 – Bob Murphy, 37, pitcher who posted a 4–9 record for the New York Giants and Brooklyn Gladiators during the 1890 season.
- December 18 – John Clapp, 53, catcher and manager for several teams from 1872 through 1883, who hit a career .283 average in 588 games, including three .300 seasons.
