= Jim Fairbank =

American baseball player (1881-1955)

- Pitcher
- Born: March 17, 1881; Deansboro, New York, U.S.
- Died: December 27, 1955 (aged 74); Utica, New York, U.S.
- Batted: Right Threw: Right

MLB debut
- September 18, 1903, for the Philadelphia Athletics

Last MLB appearance
- October 8, 1904, for the Philadelphia Athletics

MLB statistics
- Win–loss record: 1–2
- Earned run average: 5.49
- Strikeouts: 16
- Stats at Baseball Reference

Teams
- Philadelphia Athletics (1903–1904)

James Lee Fairbank (March 17, 1881 – December 27, 1955) was an American pitcher in Major League Baseball. He played for the Philadelphia Athletics during the 1903 and 1904 seasons.
