= Champ Osteen =

American baseball player (1877–1962)

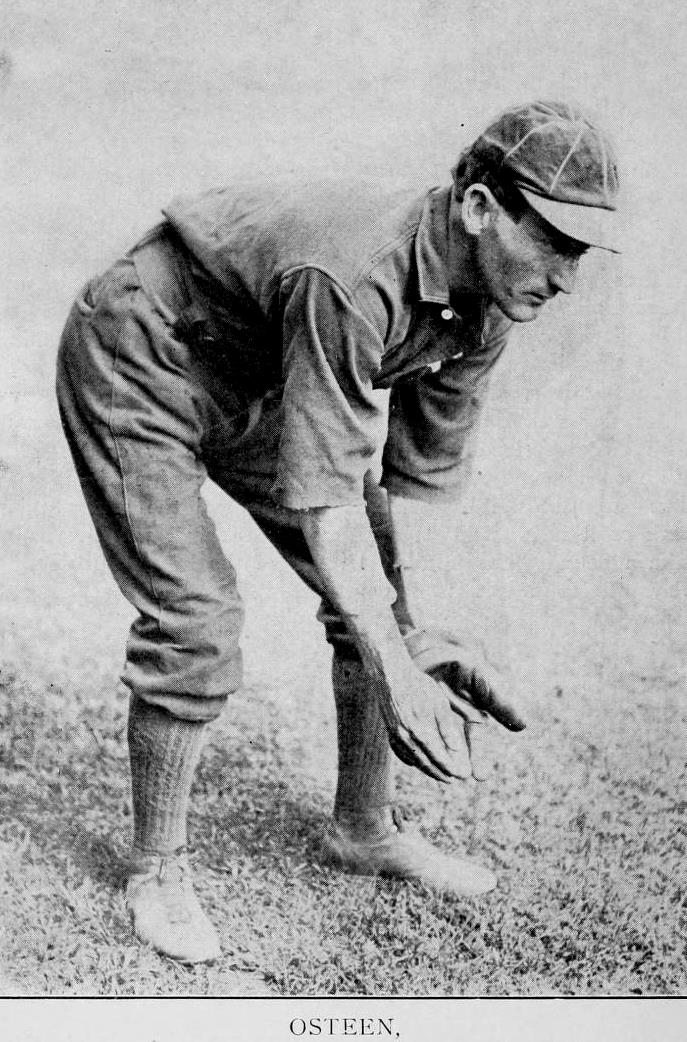
- Infielder
- Born: February 24, 1877; Hendersonville, North Carolina, U.S.
- Died: December 14, 1962 (aged 85); Piedmont, South Carolina, U.S.
- Batted: Left Threw: Right

MLB debut
- September 18, 1903, for the Washington Senators

Last MLB appearance
- May 3, 1909, for the St. Louis Cardinals

MLB statistics
- Batting average: .197
- Home runs: 2
- Runs batted in: 31
- Stats at Baseball Reference

Teams
- Washington Senators (1903); New York Highlanders (1904); St. Louis Cardinals (1908–1909)

James Champlin "Champ" Osteen (February 24, 1877 – December 14, 1962) was an American professional baseball player. He played all or part of four seasons in Major League Baseball for the Washington Senators, New York Highlanders and the St. Louis Cardinals in 1903, 1904, 1908 and 1909, primarily as a shortstop. He batted left and threw right-handed. In 83 career games, he had 60 hits in 304 at bats.

Osteen was born in Hendersonville, North Carolina and attended Erskine College. After baseball, Osteen served as a welder and blacksmith for the city of Greenville, South Carolina from 1935 until his retirement in 1957 due to his eyesight diminishing. Osteen suffered from partial blindness and other maladies until his death on December 14, 1962 at his son's house in Piedmont, South Carolina.
