= 1904 Cleveland Naps season =

1904 Cleveland Naps
- League: American League
- Ballpark: League Park
- City: Cleveland
- Record: 86–65 (.570)
- League place: 4th
- Owners: Charles Somers
- Managers: Bill Armour

The 1904 Cleveland Naps season was a season in American baseball. The team finished fourth in the American League with a record of 86–65, 7½ games behind the Boston Americans.

== Regular season ==
=== Season standings ===
American League
Team	W	L	Pct.	GB	Home	Road
Boston Americans	95	59	.617	—	49‍–‍30	46‍–‍29
New York Highlanders	92	59	.609	1½	46‍–‍29	46‍–‍30
Chicago White Sox	89	65	.578	6	50‍–‍27	39‍–‍38
Cleveland Naps	86	65	.570	7½	44‍–‍31	42‍–‍34
Philadelphia Athletics	81	70	.536	12½	47‍–‍31	34‍–‍39
St. Louis Browns	65	87	.428	29	32‍–‍43	33‍–‍44
Detroit Tigers	62	90	.408	32	34‍–‍40	28‍–‍50
Washington Senators	38	113	.252	55½	23‍–‍52	15‍–‍61

=== Record vs. opponents ===
1904 American League record Sources:
Team	BOS	CWS	CLE	DET	NYH	PHA	SLB	WSH
Boston	—	13–9	9–13	16–6	12–10–2	13–9–1	12–10	20–2
Chicago	9–13	—	14–8	14–8–1	12–10–1	8–14	14–8	18–4
Cleveland	13–9	8–14	—	14–8–2	9–11–1	11–10	13–9	18–4
Detroit	6–16	8–14–1	8–14–2	—	7–15	10–12–1	11–11–2	12–8–4
New York	10–12–2	10–12–1	11–9–1	15–7	—	12–9	16–6	18–4
Philadelphia	9–13–1	14–8	10–11	12–10–1	9–12	—	11–10–1	16–6–1
St. Louis	10–12	8–14	9–13	11–11–2	6–16	10–11–1	—	11–10–1
Washington	2–20	4–18	4–18	8–12–4	4–18	6–16–1	10–11–1	—

=== Notable transactions ===
- August 18, 1904: Nick Kahl was purchased by the Naps from the Colorado Springs Millionaires.

=== Roster ===
1904 Cleveland Naps
Roster
Pitchers: Bill Bernhard; Red Donahue; Otto Hess; Jack Hickey; Addie Joss; Earl Moore; Bob Rhoads	Catchers: Fred Abbott; Harry Bemis; Fritz Buelow; Harry Ostdiek; Infielders: Bill Bradley; Charlie Carr; Mike Donovan; Charlie Hickman; Nap Lajoie; Bill Schwartz; George Stovall; Terry Turner	Outfielders: Harry Bay; Elmer Flick; Billy Lush; Claude Rossman; Rube Vinson	Manager: Bill Armour

== Player stats ==
=== Batting ===
==== Starters by position ====
Note: Pos = Position; G = Games played; AB = At bats; H = Hits; Avg. = Batting average; HR = Home runs; RBI = Runs batted in

Pos	Player	G	AB	H	Avg.	HR	RBI
C	Harry Bemis	97	336	76	.226	0	25
1B	Charlie Hickman	86	337	97	.288	4	45
2B	Nap Lajoie	140	553	208	.376	5	102
SS	Terry Turner	111	404	95	.235	1	45
3B	Bill Bradley	154	609	183	.300	6	83
OF	Elmer Flick	150	579	177	.306	6	56
OF	Billy Lush	138	477	123	.258	1	50
OF	Harry Bay	132	506	122	.241	3	36

==== Other batters ====
Note: G = Games played; AB = At bats; H = Hits; Avg. = Batting average; HR = Home runs; RBI = Runs batted in

Player	G	AB	H	Avg.	HR	RBI
George Stovall	52	181	54	.298	1	31
Fred Abbott	41	130	22	.169	0	12
Charlie Carr	32	120	27	.225	0	7
Fritz Buelow	42	119	21	.176	0	5
Bill Schwartz	24	86	13	.151	0	0
Claude Rossman	18	62	13	.210	0	6
Rube Vinson	15	49	15	.306	0	2
Harry Ostdiek	7	18	3	.167	0	3
Mike Donovan	2	2	0	.000	0	0

=== Pitching ===
==== Starting pitchers ====
Note: G = Games pitched; IP = Innings pitched; W = Wins; L = Losses; ERA = Earned run average; SO = Strikeouts

Player	G	IP	W	L	ERA	SO
Bill Bernhard	38	320.2	23	13	2.13	137
Red Donahue	35	277.0	19	14	2.40	127
Earl Moore	26	227.2	12	11	2.25	139
Addie Joss	25	192.1	14	10	1.59	83
Bob Rhoads	22	175.1	10	9	2.87	72
Otto Hess	21	151.2	8	7	1.67	64
Jack Hickey	2	12.1	0	1	7.30	5
