= Harry Vahrenhorst =

American baseball player (1885-1943)

- Born: February 13, 1885; St. Louis, Missouri
- Died: October 10, 1943 (aged 58); St. Louis, Missouri
- Batted: Right Threw: Right

MLB debut
- September 21, 1904, for the St. Louis Browns

Last MLB appearance
- September 21, 1904, for the St. Louis Browns

MLB statistics
- Games played: 1
- At bats: 1
- Hits: 0
- Stats at Baseball Reference

Teams
- St. Louis Browns (1904)

Harry Henry Vahrenhorst (February 13, 1885 to October 10, 1943) was a Major League Baseball player who played in 1904 with the St. Louis Browns.

He died in St. Louis, Missouri in 1943 of pulmonary tuberculosis.
