= Jack Zalusky =

American baseball player (1879-1935)

John Zalusky
- Catcher
- Born: June 22, 1879; Minneapolis, Minnesota, U.S.
- Died: August 11, 1935 (aged 56); Minneapolis, Minnesota, U.S.
- Batted: Right Threw: Right

MLB debut
- September 4, 1903, for the New York Highlanders

Last MLB appearance
- September 29, 1903, for the New York Highlanders

MLB statistics
- Batting average: .313
- Home runs: 0
- Runs batted in: 1
- Stats at Baseball Reference

Teams
- New York Highlanders (1903)

John Francis Zalusky (June 22, 1879 – August 11, 1935) was an American professional baseball catcher. He played part of one season of Major League Baseball with the New York Highlanders, now known as the New York Yankees, playing in seven games during the 1903 season.

Zalusky played college baseball at Minnesota before joining the professional ranks with the Louisville Colonels in 1901. He performed well enough that, following the 1901 season, his contract was purchased by the Chicago Orphans of the National League. However, he was injured before the season began and was therefore unlikely to make the roster over several other veteran catchers including Frank Chance, Mike Kahoe and Johnny Kling. He requested and was granted a release by Frank Selee. He began the 1902 season with the Minneapolis club of then-unrecognized American Association but was persuaded by Walt Wilmot to come west to join the Tacoma club of the Pacific Northwest League.
