= Al Orth =

American baseball player, coach, and umpire (1872–1948)

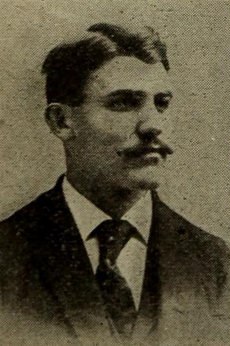
- Orth c. 1915–1916
- Pitcher
- Born: September 5, 1872; Sedalia, Missouri, U.S.
- Died: October 8, 1948 (aged 76); Lynchburg, Virginia, U.S.
- Batted: Left Threw: Right

MLB debut
- August 15, 1895, for the Philadelphia Phillies

Last MLB appearance
- September 20, 1909, for the New York Highlanders

MLB statistics
- Win–loss record: 204–189
- Earned run average: 3.37
- Strikeouts: 948
- Stats at Baseball Reference

Teams
- Philadelphia Phillies (1895–1901); Washington Senators (1902–1904); New York Highlanders (1904–1909)

Career highlights and awards
- MLB wins leader (1906)

Albert Lewis Orth (September 5, 1872 – October 8, 1948) was an American right-handed pitcher in Major League Baseball. He later served as a major league umpire and college baseball coach.

== Early life ==
Orth was born in Sedalia, Missouri and attended DePauw University.

== Playing career ==
As a young pitcher with the Lynchburg minor league team in the Virginia League in 1895, Orth won 28 games. He was called up to the Philadelphia Phillies and won his first eight starts for them. He finished the year with an 8–1 record and a 3.89 ERA in 11 games, with nine complete games and one save in a total of 88 innings. He had 25 strikeouts and 22 walks. Batting wise, he had a .356 batting average due to having 16 hits in 45 at-bats with a home run and 13 RBIs. The following year, Orth went 15–10 with a 4.41 ERA in 25 games and 196 innings of work. He had 23 strikeouts and 46 walks while having 19 complete games. In 25 games, he batted .256 while having 13 RBIs and a home run. Before the 1902 season, Orth and several other Phillies left for the American League; Orth joined the Washington Senators. When Orth was traded to the New York Highlanders in 1904 after struggling the year before, he picked up the spitball from Jack Chesbro and had his best year in 1906, going 27–17 and leading the American League in wins. During that season, Orth threw 36 complete games in 39 starts.

Known as The Curveless Wonder, Orth never relied on the breaking ball. Instead, his pitching success centered on his control and his ability to change pitch speeds. His pitch was once described in a poem by W.A. Phelon as a "glistening ball... but little speed, and scarce a curve at all." Orth twice finished with the fewest walks in his league. He is one of a handful of pitchers to earn 100 wins in both the National League and the American League. After Orth earned his 199th win in 1907, it took nine attempts to earn number 200; this still represents the greatest difficulty any pitcher has had in reaching the milestone.

Orth was also known for his hitting skills, finishing seventh all-time among pitchers in hits, with a lifetime total of 464. He posted a .273 batting average with 12 home runs and 184 RBI. Orth would frequently hit above .300. The left-handed hitter was used as a pinch hitter 78 times and even played the field on a few occasions, including fifty-five games as an outfielder and eight at shortstop during his time with the Washington Senators.

== Umpiring and coaching days ==
After knee injuries and a sore arm ended his career, he managed for Lynchburg in the Virginia League. He debuted as a National League umpire in the summer of 1912. He was the umpire on May 2, 1917, when Fred Toney and Hippo Vaughn each pitched 9 innings of no-hit baseball, the only time in regulation when neither team got a hit. After umpiring for several seasons, knee problems forced him to stop. He later coached at Washington and Lee University as well as the Virginia Military Institute.

In the years before the National League provided for two umpires per game, it was not unusual for both teams in a baseball game to choose one of their players to alternate umpiring duties if the regular umpire failed to appear for the game, and Orth sometimes served that role. On August 20, 1901, Orth had the distinction of playing and umpiring in the same game, when manager Bill Shettsline sent him in as a pinch hitter in the ninth inning. Orth hit a single in the Phillies' 3–2 loss to the Brooklyn Dodgers.

== Death ==
Orth died at age 76 at his Lynchburg, Virginia, home on October 8, 1948. He was survived by his wife and two sons.

== See also ==
- List of Major League Baseball umpires (disambiguation)
- List of Major League Baseball career wins leaders
- List of Major League Baseball annual saves leaders
- List of Major League Baseball annual wins leaders
