= Del Mason =

American baseball player (1883–1962)

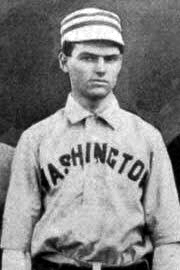
- Mason with the Senators in 1904
- Pitcher
- Born: October 29, 1883; Newfane, New York, U.S.
- Died: December 31, 1962 (aged 79); Winter Park, Florida, U.S.
- Batted: Right Threw: Right

MLB debut
- April 23, 1904, for the Washington Senators

Last MLB appearance
- August 16, 1907, for the Cincinnati Reds

MLB statistics
- Games played: 32
- ERA: 3.72
- Wins: 5
- Losses: 16
- W–L %: .238
- Shutouts: 1
- Stats at Baseball Reference

Teams
- Washington Senators (1904); Cincinnati Reds (1906–1907)

Adelbert William Mason (October 29, 1883 – December 31, 1962) was a Major League Baseball player for the Washington Senators and the Cincinnati Reds. Prior to his professional debut, Mason, a pitcher, played at the college level for Rollins College. The school's baseball program started in 1895 and Mason was their first player to play at the major league level.

Mason would later go on to marry Dorothy Temple, who was the daughter of Pittsburgh Pirates' part-owner, William Chase Temple, and granddaughter of former major league pitcher, Jimmy Wood.
