= Pat Hynes =

American baseball player (1884–1907)

- Outfielder
- Born: March 12, 1884; St. Louis, Missouri
- Died: March 12, 1907 (aged 23); St. Louis, Missouri
- Batted: Unknown Threw: Left

MLB debut
- September 27, 1903, for the St. Louis Cardinals

Last MLB appearance
- October 9, 1904, for the St. Louis Browns

MLB statistics
- Batting average: .233
- Home runs: 0
- Runs batted in: 15

Teams
- St. Louis Cardinals (1904); St. Louis Browns (1904)

Patrick J. Hynes (March 12, 1884 – March 12, 1907) was an outfielder in Major League Baseball.

== Biography ==
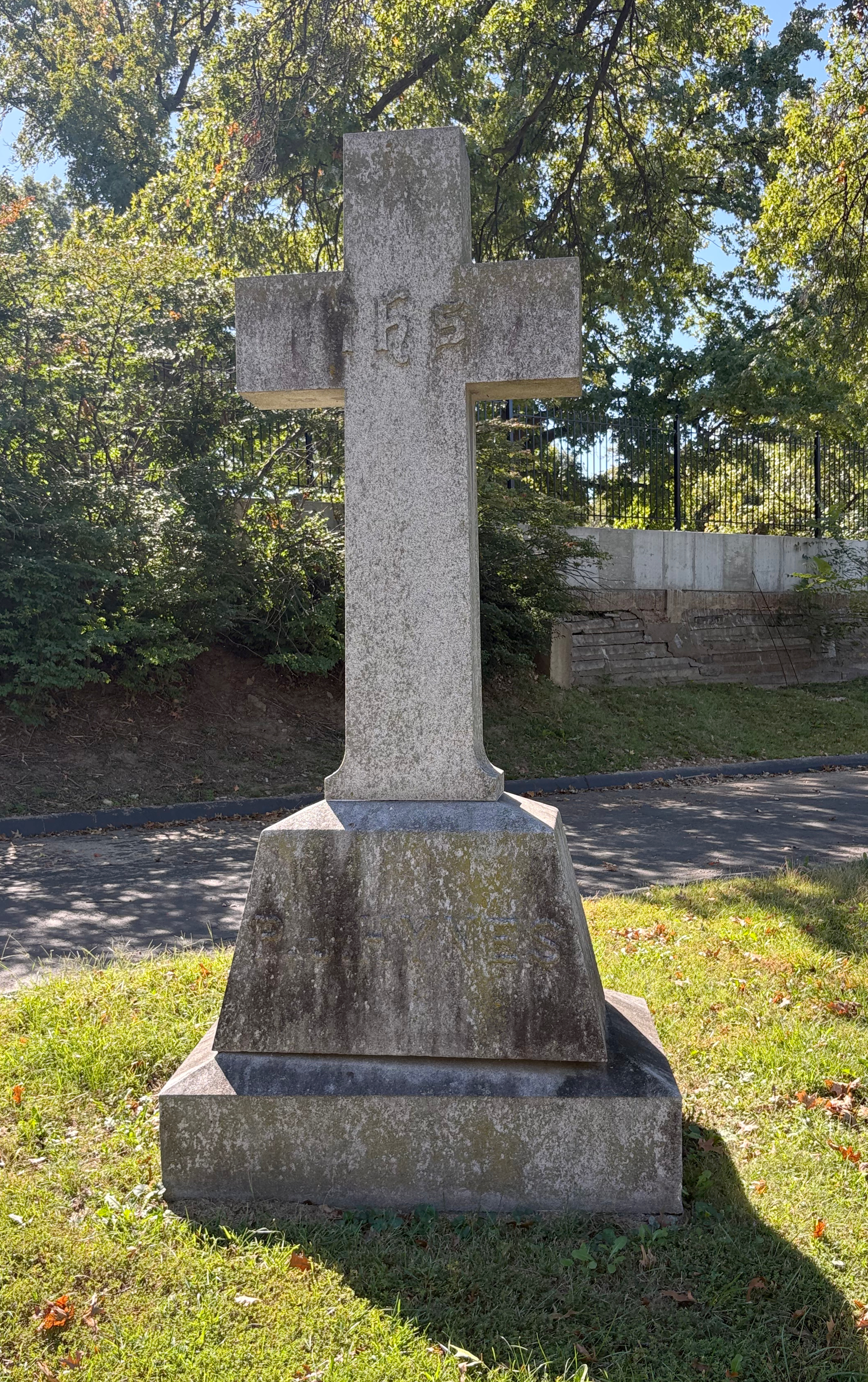
Hynes's grave at Calvary Cemetery

After sitting on the St. Louis Browns bench for most of the 1904 season, Hynes went down to the minor leagues in 1905 and 1906. In March 1907, on his 23rd birthday, he was shot by a bartender over a credit dispute.

He was buried at Calvary Cemetery in St. Louis.
