= Jack Hickey (baseball) =

American baseball player (1881-1941)

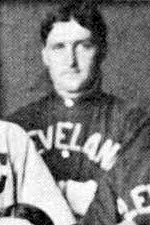
- Pitcher
- Born: November 3, 1881; Minneapolis, Minnesota
- Died: December 28, 1941 (aged 60); Seattle, Washington
- Batted: Right Threw: Left

MLB debut
- April 16, 1904, for the Cleveland Blues

Last MLB appearance
- May 4, 1904, for the Cleveland Naps

MLB statistics
- Pitching Record: 0-1
- Earned run average: 7.30
- Strikeouts: 5
- Stats at Baseball Reference

Teams
- Cleveland Naps (1904)

John William Hickey (November 3, 1881 – December 28, 1941) was a Major League Baseball pitcher who played for one season. He pitched two games for the Cleveland Naps during the 1904 season, starting both.
