= 1904 Chicago White Sox season =

1904 Chicago White Sox
- League: American League
- Ballpark: South Side Park
- City: Chicago, Illinois
- Record: 89–65 (.578)
- League place: 3rd
- Owners: Charles Comiskey
- Managers: Nixey Callahan, Fielder Jones

== Regular season ==
=== Season standings ===
American League
Team	W	L	Pct.	GB	Home	Road
Boston Americans	95	59	.617	—	49‍–‍30	46‍–‍29
New York Highlanders	92	59	.609	1½	46‍–‍29	46‍–‍30
Chicago White Sox	89	65	.578	6	50‍–‍27	39‍–‍38
Cleveland Naps	86	65	.570	7½	44‍–‍31	42‍–‍34
Philadelphia Athletics	81	70	.536	12½	47‍–‍31	34‍–‍39
St. Louis Browns	65	87	.428	29	32‍–‍43	33‍–‍44
Detroit Tigers	62	90	.408	32	34‍–‍40	28‍–‍50
Washington Senators	38	113	.252	55½	23‍–‍52	15‍–‍61

=== Record vs. opponents ===
1904 American League record Sources:
Team	BOS	CWS	CLE	DET	NYH	PHA	SLB	WSH
Boston	—	13–9	9–13	16–6	12–10–2	13–9–1	12–10	20–2
Chicago	9–13	—	14–8	14–8–1	12–10–1	8–14	14–8	18–4
Cleveland	13–9	8–14	—	14–8–2	9–11–1	11–10	13–9	18–4
Detroit	6–16	8–14–1	8–14–2	—	7–15	10–12–1	11–11–2	12–8–4
New York	10–12–2	10–12–1	11–9–1	15–7	—	12–9	16–6	18–4
Philadelphia	9–13–1	14–8	10–11	12–10–1	9–12	—	11–10–1	16–6–1
St. Louis	10–12	8–14	9–13	11–11–2	6–16	10–11–1	—	11–10–1
Washington	2–20	4–18	4–18	8–12–4	4–18	6–16–1	10–11–1	—

=== Roster ===
1904 Chicago White Sox
Roster
Pitchers: Nick Altrock; Tom Dougherty; Patsy Flaherty; Frank Owen; Roy Patterson; Frank Smith; Elmer Stricklett; Ed Walsh; Doc White	Catchers: Claude Berry; Mike Heydon; Ed McFarland; Billy Sullivan; Infielders: George Davis; Jiggs Donahue; Gus Dundon; Frank Isbell; Lee Tannehill	Outfielders: Nixey Callahan; Danny Green; Ducky Holmes; Frank Huelsman; Charlie Jones; Fielder Jones	Manager: Nixey Callahan; Fielder Jones

== Player stats ==
=== Batting ===
==== Starters by position ====
Note: Pos = Position; G = Games played; AB = At bats; H = Hits; Avg. = Batting average; HR = Home runs; RBI = Runs batted in

Pos	Player	G	AB	H	Avg.	HR	RBI
C	Billy Sullivan	108	371	85	.229	1	44
1B	Jiggs Donahue	102	367	91	.248	1	48
2B	Gus Dundon	108	373	85	.228	0	36
SS	George Davis	152	563	142	.252	1	69
3B	Lee Tannehill	153	547	125	.229	0	61
OF	Fielder Jones	149	547	133	.243	3	32
OF	Nixey Callahan	132	482	126	.261	0	54
OF	Danny Green	147	536	142	.265	2	62

==== Other batters ====
Note: G = Games played; AB = At bats; H = Hits; Avg. = Batting average; HR = Home runs; RBI = Runs batted in

Player	G	AB	H	Avg.	HR	RBI
Frank Isbell	96	314	66	.210	1	34
Ducky Holmes	68	251	78	.311	1	19
Ed McFarland	50	160	44	.275	0	20
Charlie Jones	5	17	4	.235	0	1
Mike Heydon	4	10	1	.100	0	1
Frank Huelsman	4	7	1	.143	0	0
Claude Berry	3	1	0	.000	0	0

=== Pitching ===
==== Starting pitchers ====
Note: G = Games pitched; IP = Innings pitched; W = Wins; L = Losses; ERA = Earned run average; SO = Strikeouts

Player	G	IP	W	L	ERA	SO
Frank Owen	37	315.0	21	15	1.94	103
Nick Altrock	38	307.0	19	14	2.96	87
Doc White	30	228.0	16	12	1.78	115
Frank Smith	26	203.1	16	9	2.08	107
Roy Patterson	22	165.0	9	9	2.29	64
Patsy Flaherty	5	43.0	1	2	2.09	14
Elmer Stricklett	1	6.0	0	1	12.00	3

==== Other pitchers ====
Note: G = Games pitched; IP = Innings pitched; W = Wins; L = Losses; ERA = Earned run average; SO = Strikeouts

Player	G	IP	W	L	ERA	SO
Ed Walsh	18	110.2	6	3	2.60	57

==== Relief pitchers ====
Note: G = Games pitched; W = Wins; L = Losses; SV = Saves; ERA = Earned run average; SO = Strikeouts

Player	G	W	L	SV	ERA	SO
Tom Dougherty	1	1	0	0	0.00	0
