= John Barthold =

American baseball player (1882-1946)

- Pitcher
- Born: April 14, 1882; Philadelphia, Pennsylvania, U.S.
- Died: November 4, 1946 (aged 64); Fairview Village, Pennsylvania, U.S.
- Batted: Switch Threw: Right

MLB debut
- May 17, 1904, for the Philadelphia Athletics

Last MLB appearance
- June 8, 1904, for the Philadelphia Athletics

MLB statistics
- Win–loss record: 0–0
- Earned run average: 5.06
- Strikeouts: 5
- Stats at Baseball Reference

Teams
- Philadelphia Athletics (1904)

John Francis Barthold (April 14, 1882 – November 4, 1946), nicknamed "Hans", was an American Major League Baseball pitcher. He played for the Philadelphia Athletics for one season.
