= Frank McManus (baseball) =

American baseball player (1875–1923)

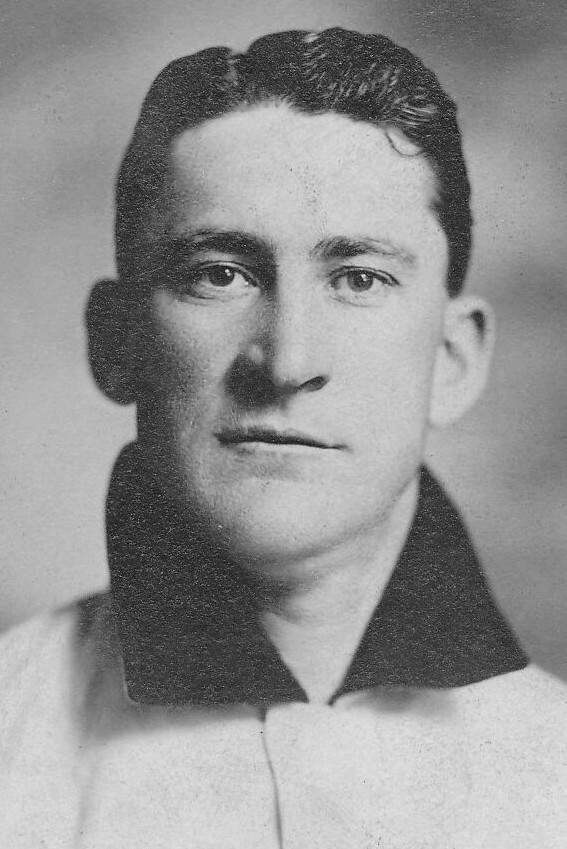
- Catcher
- Born: September 23, 1875; Lawrence, Massachusetts, U.S.
- Died: September 1, 1923 (aged 48); Syracuse, New York, U.S.
- Batted: Unknown Threw: Right

MLB debut
- September 14, 1899, for the Washington Senators

Last MLB appearance
- October 8, 1904, for the New York Highlanders

MLB statistics
- Batting average: .229
- Home runs: 0
- Runs batted in: 2
- Stats at Baseball Reference

Teams
- Washington Senators (1899); Brooklyn Superbas (1903); Detroit Tigers (1904); New York Highlanders (1904)

Francis E. McManus (September 21, 1875 – September 1, 1923) was an American professional baseball player who played catcher from 1899 to 1904.

McManus was found dead in an inn in Syracuse in September 1923. The proprietor, bartender and janitor were detained for questioning in connection with the death which police were investigating as a murder. The proprietor and janitor reportedly told police that McManus claimed to have been poisoned by a woman. However, an autopsy revealed that he had suffered a fractured skull.
