= Bill O'Neill (baseball) =

Canadian baseball player (1880–1920)

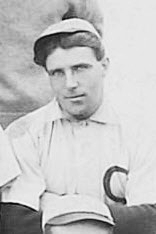
- Outfielder
- Born: January 22, 1880; Saint John, New Brunswick, Canada
- Died: July 20, 1920 (aged 40); Woodhaven, New York, U.S.
- Batted: Switch Threw: Right

MLB debut
- May 7, 1904, for the Boston Americans

Last MLB appearance
- October 7, 1906, for the Chicago White Sox

MLB statistics
- Batting average: .243
- Home runs: 2
- Runs batted in: 42
- Stats at Baseball Reference

Teams
- Boston Americans (1904); Washington Senators (1904); Chicago White Sox (1906)

Career highlights and awards
- World Series champion (1906)

William John O'Neill (January 22, 1880 – July 20, 1920) was a Canadian outfielder in Major League Baseball who played for the Boston Americans (1904), Washington Senators (1904) and Chicago White Sox (1906). O'Neill was a switch-hitter and threw right-handed. He was born in Saint John, New Brunswick, Canada.

Playing at shortstop in his 1904 rookie season for the Red Sox, O'Neill committed six errors during a 13-inning 5–3 loss to the St Louis Browns on May 21 to become the only 20th-century Major League player to record six errors in a game. In the midseason he was traded to Washington in the same transaction that brought Kip Selbach to Boston. In 1906 O'Neill was a member of the Chicago White Sox team that won the World Championship over the Chicago Cubs in six games.

In a two-season career, O'Neill was a .243 hitter with two home runs and 42 RBI in 206 games played.

O'Neill died in Woodhaven, New York, at the age of 40.

== See also ==
- List of Major League Baseball players from Canada
