= Monte Beville =

American baseball player (1875–1955)

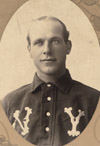
- Catcher
- Born: February 24, 1875; Dublin, Indiana, U.S.
- Died: January 24, 1955 (aged 79); Grand Rapids, Minnesota, U.S.
- Batted: Left Threw: Right

MLB debut
- April 24, 1903, for the New York Highlanders

Last MLB appearance
- October 8, 1904, for the Detroit Tigers

MLB statistics
- Batting average: .203
- Home runs: 0
- Runs batted in: 44
- Stats at Baseball Reference

Teams
- New York Highlanders (1903–1904); Detroit Tigers (1904)

Henry Monte Beville (February 24, 1875 – January 24, 1955) was an American Major League Baseball (MLB) catcher and first basemen who played in 1903 and 1904. He played for the New York Highlanders and the Detroit Tigers. He had a .203 career batting average.
