= Charlie Carr =

American baseball player and manager (1875–1932)

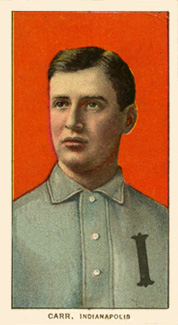
- First baseman
- Born: December 27, 1875; Coatesville, Pennsylvania, U.S.
- Died: November 25, 1932 (aged 56); Memphis, Tennessee, U.S.
- Batted: Right Threw: Right

MLB debut
- September 15, 1898, for the Washington Senators

Last MLB appearance
- October 8, 1914, for the Indianapolis Hoosiers

MLB statistics
- Batting average: .252
- Home runs: 6
- Runs batted in: 240
- Stats at Baseball Reference

Teams
- Washington Senators (1898); Philadelphia Athletics (1901); Detroit Tigers (1903–1904); Cleveland Naps (1904–1905); Cincinnati Reds (1906); Indianapolis Hoosiers (1914)

Charles Carbitt Carr (December 27, 1875 – November 25, 1932) was an American professional baseball first baseman and manager. He played from 1894 to 1919, including seven years in Major League Baseball with the Washington Senators (1898), Philadelphia Athletics (1901), Detroit Tigers (1903–1904), Cleveland Naps (1904–1905), Cincinnati Reds (1906), and Indianapolis Hoosiers (1914). Over his seven-year major league career, Carr had a .252 batting average with 493 hits, 106 extra base hits, and 240 runs batted in (RBIs).

He also served as a player-manager in the minor leagues for the Indianapolis Indians (1906–1910), Utica Utes (1911), and Kansas City Blues (1912–1913). He concluded his professional baseball career in 1919 as a player for the Providence Grays. He was also a principal of the Bradley & Carr sporting goods company.

== Early years ==
Carr was born in 1876 in Coatesville, Pennsylvania. He attended elementary and high school in Coatesville and then enrolled at Lehigh University.

== Professional baseball ==
=== 1895 to 1902 seasons ===
Carr began playing professional baseball in 1895 in the Interstate League. He next played in 1897 for the Rochester club in the Eastern League. He had been a catcher up to that point, but he later recalled that his "throwing arm was dead", and he then became a first baseman.

In 1898, he played for the Taunton Herrings in the New England League and compiled a .302 batting average. In September of that year, Carr made his major league debut with the Washington Senators of the National League. He appeared in 20 games late in the season and compiled a .192 batting average in 73 at bats.

Carr returned to the minor leagues in 1899, playing for Worcester in the Eastern League, hitting .322 in 94 games. He next played for the Toronto club in the Eastern League, compiling a .327 average in 1900 and .304 in 1901.

Carr had his second shot at the majors in 1901, appearing in two games for the Philadelphia Athletics in the American League. He had one hit in eight at bats for Philadelphia. He suffered from an illness that slowed him down while with the Athletics.

Carr then spent the 1902 season playing for the Jersey City Skeeters of the Eastern League. He compiled a career-high .335 batting average in 100 games with Jersey City.

=== Detroit Tigers (1903–04) ===
In January 1903, Carr signed with the Detroit Tigers. During the 1903 season, Carr was the Tigers' starting first baseman, appearing in 135 games. He hit .281 and ranked among the American League leaders with 111 assists at first base (first), 25 errors at first base (third), 1,276 putouts at first base (fifth), .982 fielding percentage (fifth), 60 double plays turned at first base (fifth), 548 at bats (eighth), and 79 RBIs (ninth).

Carr holds the Detroit Tigers team record for fewest base on balls in a season by a player with at least 500 plate appearances. In 1903, he walked only 10 times in 573 plate appearances, a rate of one walk in every 57 at-bats.

Carr returned to the Tigers as the starting first baseman in 1904. He suffered a broken nose when he was hit by a fastball between his nose and left eye during a spring game in Nashville. He appeared in 92 games for the 1904 Tigers, but his batting average fell by 67 points to .214. Interviewed in November 1905, Carr attributed his decline at the plate to the incident in which his nose was broken in Nashville: "There is no doubt that that bump I got in the nose down south two years ago had something to do with my falling off with the stick. I know I pulled away from the plate the rest of that year."

=== Cleveland Naps (1904–05) ===
On August 7, 1904, the Tigers traded Carr to the Cleveland Naps for Charlie Hickman. Carr appeared in 32 games for the Naps in 1904 as a backup to first baseman Charlie Hickman. Carr hit .224 in 120 at bats in 1904. In 1905, he became the Naps' starting first baseman, appearing in 89 games and compiling a .235 batting average in 306 at bats.

=== Cincinnati Reds (1906) ===
On November 23, 1905, the Cincinnati Reds purchased Carr from Cleveland. He was initially slated to be Cincinnati's manager, but the team instead hired Ned Hanlon as manager. At the time of Hanlon's hiring, Carr said: "While I feel sure that I could have made good as manager in Cincinnati, I think that Hermann has secured a splendid man in Hanlon."

He appeared in only 22 games and hit .191. Carr later recalled his experience in Cincinnati as follows: "In 1906, with the understanding that I would serve as manager, I went to Cincinnati, but I didn't hit it off with an influential sports writer on the Enquirer, so I was forced to hunt a job elsewhere after starting that season with the Reds."

=== Indianapolis Indians (1906–10) ===
Carr served as a player-manager for the Indianapolis Indians of the American Association from 1906 to 1910. On July 27, 1906, Carr entered the crowd during a game in Indianapolis and struck a spectator three or four times in the head, knocking him down and causing him to sprain his wrist. He was tried for assault in August but acquitted due to a jurisdictional technicality. His 1908 Indianapolis team won the American Association pennant with a 92–61 record. Carr hit .301 in 522 at bats in 1908. Other key players on the 1908 team included Rube Marquard, Donie Bush, and Ed Siever. The Indians drew 500,000 spectators in 1908. Jack Hayden, who led the 1908 team with a .316 average, credited Carr with the team's success: "We have played under a leader who sympathizes with us. He always had courage and instilled courage in the team. We have been a happy family and it is with a great deal of regret that we part."

=== Utica and Kansas City (1911–13) ===
In 1911, he became player-manager for the Utica Utes of the New York State League. He served in the same capacity for the Kansas City Blues of the American Association in 1912 and 1913.

=== Indianapolis Hoosiers (1914) ===
When the Federal League formed a third major league, Carr made a comeback and won a starting spot for the Indianapolis Hoosiers. At age 37, Carr hit .295 for the Hoosiers and collected 11 doubles, 10 triples, 19 stolen bases, and 69 RBIs. After the 1914 season, Carr retired as a player to focus his efforts on a business he had established in Cleveland manufacturing athletic equipment. Carr moved his business from Cleveland to Indianapolis in 1908.

=== Providence Grays (1919) ===
In 1919, Carr returned as a player for one final season, playing for the Providence Grays in the Eastern League. At age 42, he appeared in 101 games, principally at third base, and hit for a .213 batting average.

== Later years ==
After his playing career ended, Carr operated a successful sporting goods manufacturing business, Bradley & Carr, which supplied baseballs to several minor leagues.

In 1932, Carr died suddenly in a hospital in Memphis, Tennessee. He was visiting Memphis on a business trip. He was buried at Crown Hill Cemetery (Section 74, Lot 96) in Indianapolis.
