= Rabbit Nill =

American baseball player (1881–1962)

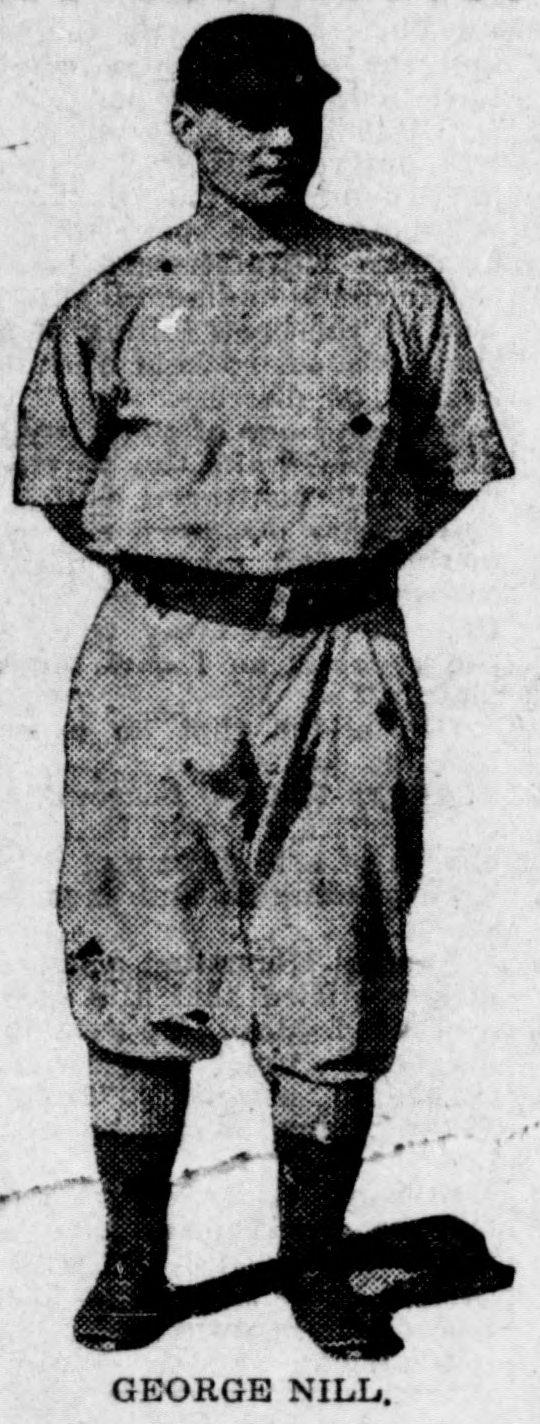
- Second baseman
- Born: July 14, 1881; Fort Wayne, Indiana, U.S.
- Died: May 24, 1962 (aged 80); Fort Wayne, Indiana, U.S.
- Batted: Right Threw: Right

MLB debut
- September 27, 1904, for the Washington Senators

Last MLB appearance
- June 22, 1908, for the Cleveland Naps

MLB statistics
- Batting average: .212
- Home runs: 3
- Runs batted in: 77
- Stats at Baseball Reference

Teams
- Washington Senators (1904–1907); Cleveland Naps (1907–1908)

George Charles "Rabbit" Nill (July 14, 1881 – May 24, 1962) was an American Major League Baseball second baseman who played for five seasons. He played for the Washington Senators from 1904 to 1907 and the Cleveland Naps from 1907 to 1908.
