= 1904 World Series =

Cancelled Major League Baseball championship series

Team (Wins)	Managers	Season
New York Giants (0)	John McGraw (player/manager)	106–47, .693, GA: 13
Boston Americans (0)	Jimmy Collins (player/manager)	95–59, .617, GA: 1 1/2
- Dates: Not played

The 1904 World Series was the scheduled championship series of Major League Baseball's (MLB) 1904 season. However, it was not played. It would have been contested between the champions of the two major leagues—the National League (NL) and the American League (AL)—as had been done in October 1903, the first modern World Series.

The league champions in 1904 were the Boston Americans (now the Boston Red Sox) of the AL and the New York Giants (now the San Francisco Giants) of the NL. Boston had clinched their second consecutive AL pennant, while New York won the 1904 NL pennant by a wide margin, 13 games ahead of the Chicago Cubs. With still no formal arrangement in place between the two leagues regarding the staging of the World Series, the Giants under owner John T. Brush refused to play against a team from what they considered an inferior league. The resulting criticism from fans and writers caused Brush to reverse course during the offseason and lead the effort to formalize the World Series between the two leagues.

== Background ==
=== Lack of a formal World Series agreement ===
In the first modern World Series in 1903, as well as several postseason series between the National League and the American Association in the 1880s (sometimes referred to as "pre-modern World Series"), the rules for a given season's "World's Championship Series" had been whatever the two participating clubs had agreed upon. The World Series was not a compulsory event and was not governed by an authoritative body. Thus, when the Boston Americans defeated the National League champion Pittsburgh Pirates in the 1903 World Series, the contest was arranged directly by the two champion clubs, not by the leagues themselves.

=== New York Giants ===
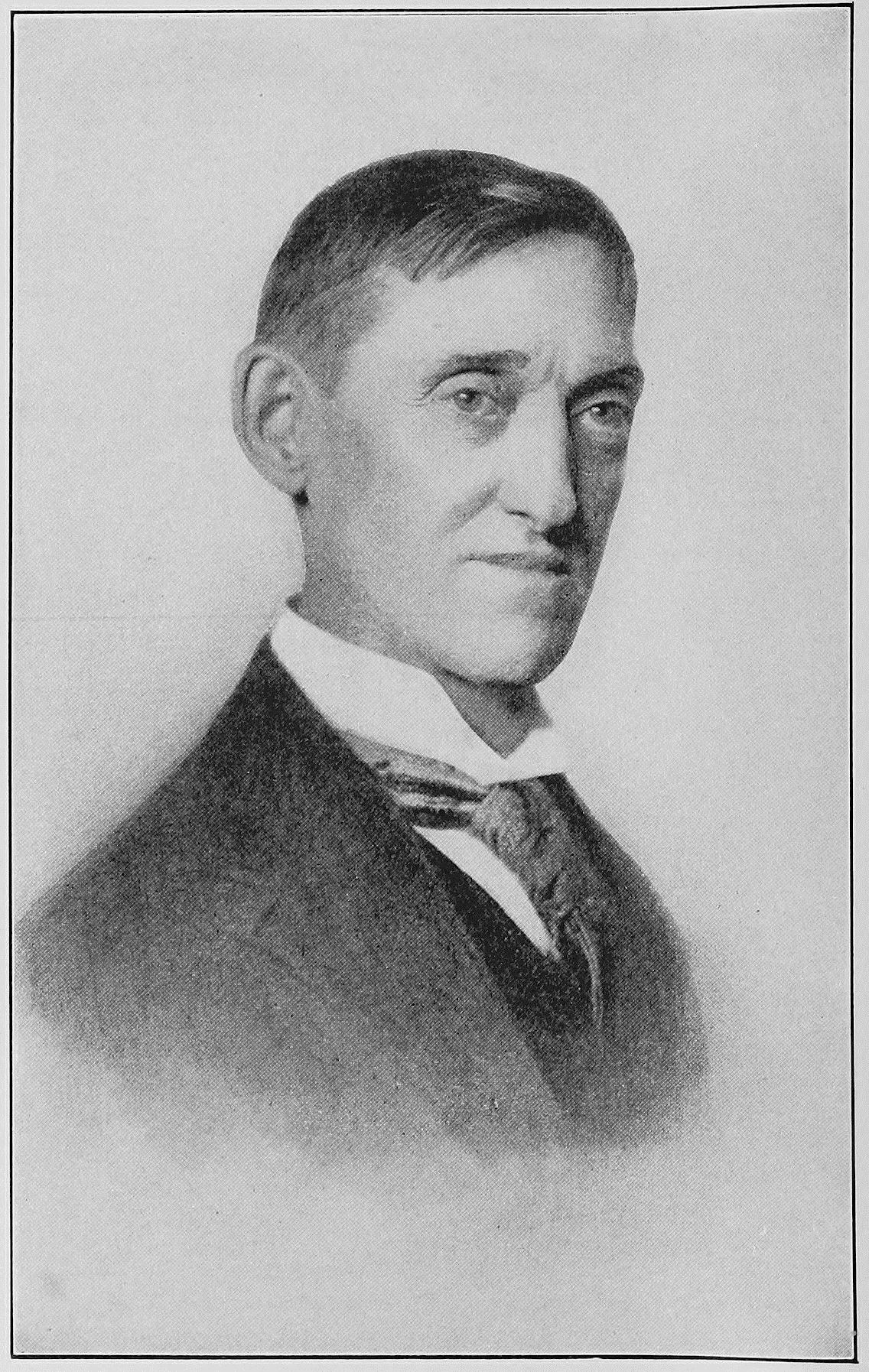
New York Giants owner John T. Brush

During this time, there was an intense business rivalry between the two leagues, especially in New York. During spring training in March 1904, New York Giants owner John T. Brush said "there will never be a series" between the New York-based teams—his Giants of the National League and the American League's New York Highlanders (now the New York Yankees)—in response to a preseason offer from Highlanders co-owner Frank J. Farrell.

In July 1904, as reported in Sporting Life, Brush stated that his NL club would not play the AL club "if each wins the pennant in its respective league", in contradiction of a preseason agreement for a championship series between the leagues.

The Giants won the NL by a wide margin (13 games). The club then stuck to their plan, refusing to play any AL club in the proposed "exhibition" series (as they considered it). Giants manager John McGraw, who had personal animosity with AL president Ban Johnson, said that his team was already the world champions because they were the champions of the "only real major league".

=== Boston Americans ===
The AL race went down to the wire. By July, the Highlanders were just 1 1/2 games behind the Boston Americans. The Highlanders then temporarily took over first place on October 7 when they defeated Boston. But the Americans won three of their four remaining games to clinch the AL pennant, and finished 1 1/2 games ahead of the Highlanders (who lost three of their final four games) in the final standings of October 10.

== Aftermath ==
Stung by criticism from fans and writers, Brush drafted rules that both leagues adopted in mid-February 1905. The rules compelled the two winning clubs to participate and governed the annual determination of sites, dates, ticket prices and division of receipts. These new rules essentially made the World Series the premier annual Major League Baseball event.

Boston slumped in 1905, while New York repeated its NL championship and won the 1905 World Series against the Philadelphia Athletics. The two teams eventually met in the 1912 World Series with the Red Sox winning in eight games (Game 2 was a tie). The Series has been played every year since except 1994, when a 232-day-long players' strike ended the season in mid-August.
