= Charles Moran (baseball) =

American baseball player (1879-1934)

- Infielder
- Born: March 26, 1879; Washington, D.C., U.S.
- Died: April 11, 1934 (aged 55); Washington, D.C., U.S.
- Batted: Unknown Threw: Right

MLB debut
- April 29, 1903, for the Washington Senators

Last MLB appearance
- June 19, 1905, for the St. Louis Browns

MLB statistics
- Batting average: .207
- Home runs: 1
- Runs batted in: 50
- Stats at Baseball Reference

Teams
- Washington Senators (1903–1904); St. Louis Browns (1904–1905)

Charles Vincent Moran (March 26, 1879 – April 11, 1934) was a professional baseball infielder who played in Major League Baseball for the Washington Senators (1903–1904) and the St. Louis Browns (1904–1905). He attended Georgetown University. He was the athletic director at Catholic University in 1915.
