= Hunter Hill (baseball) =

American baseball player (1879-1959)

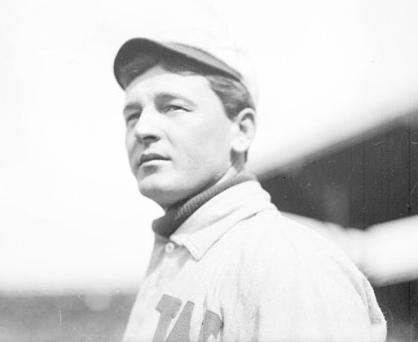
- Third baseman
- Born: June 21, 1879; Austin, Texas, U.S.
- Died: February 21, 1959 (aged 79); Austin, Texas, U.S.
- Batted: Right Threw: Right

MLB debut
- July 1, 1903, for the St. Louis Browns

Last MLB appearance
- September 5, 1905, for the Washington Senators

MLB statistics
- Batting average: .216
- Home runs: 1
- Runs batted in: 80
- Stats at Baseball Reference

Teams
- St. Louis Browns (1903–1904); Washington Senators (1904–1905)

Hunter Benjamin Hill (June 21, 1879 – February 21, 1959) was an American professional baseball third baseman, who played in Major League Baseball (MLB) for the St. Louis Browns and Washington Senators between 1903 and 1905.

In 1913, Hunter Hill, his brother Littlepage, and their father Joe Hill were on trial for the murder of Napoleon Battle who was a tenant on a farm the Hills leased.
