= Barney Wolfe =

American baseball player (1876–1953)

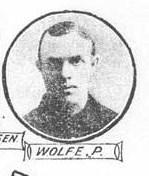
- Pitcher
- Born: June 10, 1876; Independence, Pennsylvania
- Died: February 27, 1953 (aged 77); North Charleroi, Pennsylvania
- Batted: Right Threw: Right

MLB debut
- April 24, 1903, for the New York Highlanders

Last MLB appearance
- May 24, 1906, for the Washington Senators

MLB statistics
- Win–loss record: 21-37
- Earned run average: 2.96
- Strikeouts: 160
- Stats at Baseball Reference

Teams
- New York Highlanders (1903–1904); Washington Senators (1904–1906)

Wilbert Otto "Barney" Wolfe (June 10, 1876 – February 27, 1953) was a professional baseball pitcher. He played four seasons in Major League Baseball for the New York Highlanders and the Washington Senators from 1903 to 1906. In 76 career games, he had 21 wins and 37 losses, with a 2.96 ERA. He batted and threw right-handed.

Wolfe was born in Independence, Pennsylvania, and died in North Charleroi, Pennsylvania.
