= Tom Dougherty (baseball) =

American baseball player (1881–1953)

- Pitcher
- Born: May 30, 1881; Chicago, Illinois
- Died: November 6, 1953 (aged 72); Milwaukee, Wisconsin
- Batted: Left Threw: Right

MLB debut
- April 24, 1904, for the Chicago White Sox

Last MLB appearance
- April 24, 1904, for the Chicago White Sox

MLB statistics
- Win–loss record: 1–0
- Strikeouts: 0
- Earned run average: 0.00

Teams
- Chicago White Sox (1904)

Tom Dougherty (May 30, 1881 – November 6, 1953), nicknamed "Sugar Boy", was a baseball pitcher for the Chicago White Sox in 1904. He is perhaps unique for his 'perfect' 1-0 winning record where he faced 6 batters over 2 innings without giving up any hits, walks or runs in the one game he pitched.

== Notes ==
- Baseball Reference
