= Jim Mullen (baseball) =

American baseball player (1877-1956)

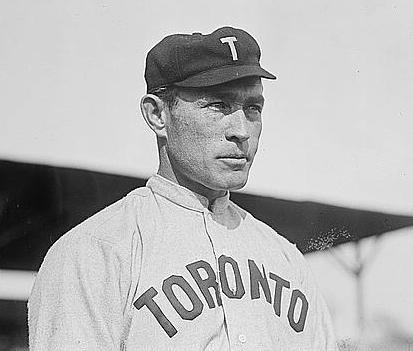
- Second baseman / First baseman
- Born: January 9, 1877; Avoca, Pennsylvania, U.S.
- Died: December 6, 1956 (aged 79); Pittston, Pennsylvania, U.S.
- Batted: Right Threw: Right

MLB debut
- June 1, 1904, for the Philadelphia Athletics

Last MLB appearance
- July 8, 1905, for the Washington Senators

MLB statistics
- Batting average: .197
- Home runs: 1
- Runs batted in: 26
- Stats at Baseball Reference

Teams
- Philadelphia Athletics (1904); Washington Senators (1904–1905)

James Henry Mullen (January 9, 1877 – December 6, 1956) was an American Major League Baseball infielder. He played for the Philadelphia Athletics during the [[1904 World Series|1904 season]] and the Washington Senators during the [[1904 World Series|1904]] and [[1905 World Series|1905 seasons]].
