= Patsy Dougherty =

American baseball player (1876–1940)

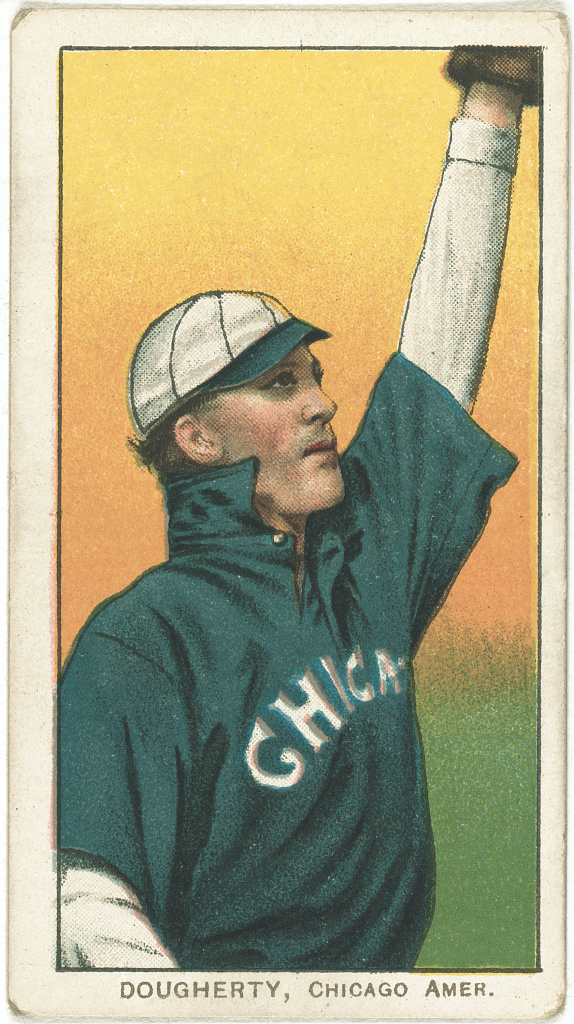
- Outfielder
- Born: October 27, 1876; Andover, New York, U.S.
- Died: April 30, 1940 (aged 63); Bolivar, New York, U.S.
- Batted: Left Threw: Right

MLB debut
- April 19, 1902, for the Boston Americans

Last MLB appearance
- September 22, 1911, for the Chicago White Sox

MLB statistics
- Batting average: .284
- Home runs: 17
- Run batted in: 413
- Stats at Baseball Reference

Teams
- Boston Americans (1902–1904); New York Highlanders (1904–1906); Chicago White Sox (1906–1911)

Career highlights and awards
- 2× World Series champion (1903, 1906); AL stolen base leader (1908)

Patrick Henry Dougherty (October 27, 1876 – April 30, 1940) was an American Major League Baseball outfielder from 1902 to 1911. He played for the Boston Americans (now the Boston Red Sox), the New York Highlanders (now the New York Yankees), and the Chicago White Sox.

On July 29, 1903, Dougherty became the second Red Sox player (then known as the Americans) to hit for the cycle. In Game 2 of the 1903 World Series, the first modern World Series, Dougherty became the first player to accomplish several feats; he became the first Boston player to hit a World Series home run, the first player to hit two home runs in a single World Series game, and the first player to hit a leadoff inside-the-park home run in a World Series game (a feat not matched until the 2015 World Series, by Alcides Escobar of the Kansas City Royals in Game 1).

In a 10-year major league career, covering 1233 games, Dougherty compiled a .284 batting average (1294-for-4558) with 678 runs, 17 home runs, 413 RBI and 261 stolen bases. In his two postseason appearances, in the 1903 and '06 World Series, he batted .185 (10-for-54) with 2 home runs and 6 RBI.

Dougherty died in Bolivar, New York, at the age of 63 and was buried at St. Mary Catholic Cemetery in Bolivar.

== See also ==
- List of Major League Baseball players to hit for the cycle
- List of Major League Baseball career stolen bases leaders
- List of Major League Baseball annual runs scored leaders
- List of Major League Baseball annual stolen base leaders

Achievements
Preceded by Buck Freeman	Hitting for the cycle July 29, 1903	Succeeded by Bill Bradley
