= Jack Thoney =

American baseball player (1879–1948)

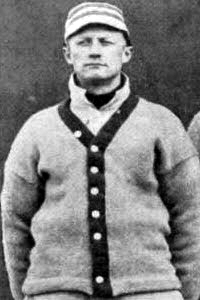
- Outfielder / Infielder
- Born: December 8, 1879; Fort Thomas, Kentucky, U.S.
- Died: October 24, 1948 (aged 68); Covington, Kentucky, U.S.
- Batted: Right Threw: Right

MLB debut
- April 26, 1902, for the Cleveland Bronchos

Last MLB appearance
- August 12, 1911, for the Boston Red Sox

MLB statistics
- Batting average: .237
- Home runs: 3
- Runs batted in: 73
- Stats at Baseball Reference

Teams
- Cleveland Bronchos (1902); Baltimore Orioles (1902); Cleveland Naps (1903); Washington Senators (1904); New York Highlanders (1904); Boston Red Sox (1908–1909, 1911)

John Thoney or John Thoeny [Bullet Jack] (December 8, 1879 – October 24, 1948) was an American reserve outfielder / infielder in Major League Baseball who played from 1902 through 1911 for the Cleveland Bronchos (1902–1903), Baltimore Orioles (1902), Washington Senators (1904), New York Highlanders (1904), and Boston Red Sox (1908–1911). Listed at 5 ft 10 in (1.78 m), 175 lb., Thoney batted and threw right-handed. He was born in Fort Thomas, Kentucky.

In a six-season career, Thoney was a .237 hitter (216-for-912) with three home runs and 73 RBI in 264 games, including 112 runs, 23 doubles, 12 triples and 42 stolen bases. He made 225 appearances at left field (97), center field (52), third base (31), right field (15), second base (19), and shortstop (11).

Thoney was born to a family of German descent. He died at the age of 68 in Covington, Kentucky.
