= Mike Kahoe =

American baseball player (1873–1949)

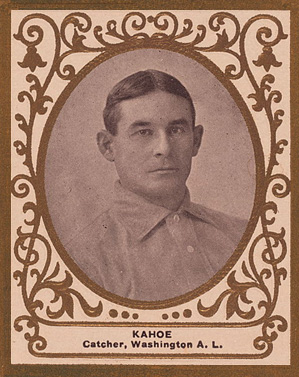
- Mike Kahoe 1909 baseball card
- Catcher
- Born: September 3, 1873; Yellow Springs, Ohio, U.S.
- Died: May 14, 1949 (aged 75); Akron, Ohio, U.S.
- Batted: Right Threw: Right

MLB debut
- September 22, 1895, for the Cincinnati Reds

Last MLB appearance
- August 12, 1909, for the Washington Senators

MLB statistics
- Batting average: .212
- Home runs: 4
- Runs batted in: 105
- Stats at Baseball Reference

Teams
- Cincinnati Reds (1895, 1899–1901); Chicago Orphans (1901–1902); St. Louis Browns (1902–1904); Philadelphia Phillies (1905); Chicago Cubs (1907); Washington Senators (1907–1909)

Michael Joseph Kahoe (September 3, 1873 – May 14, 1949) was an American catcher in Major League Baseball. Kahoe was one of the first catchers to wear shin guards. Kahoe was born on September 3, 1873, in Yellow Springs, Ohio, and made his Major League Baseball debut on September 22, 1895, with the Cincinnati Reds.
