= Happy Townsend =

American baseball player (1879–1963)

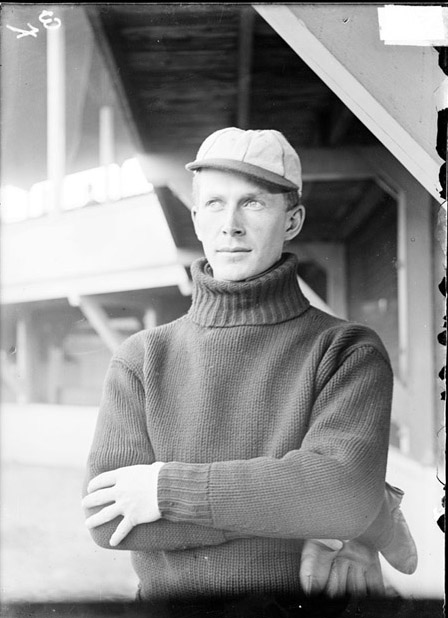
- Pitcher
- Born: April 9, 1879; Townsend, Delaware, U.S.
- Died: December 21, 1963 (aged 84); Wilmington, Delaware, U.S.
- Batted: Right Threw: Right

MLB debut
- April 19, 1901, for the Philadelphia Phillies

Last MLB appearance
- September 21, 1906, for the Cleveland Naps

MLB statistics
- Win–loss record: 34–82
- Earned run average: 3.59
- Strikeouts: 473
- Stats at Baseball Reference

Teams
- Philadelphia Phillies (1901); Washington Senators (1902–1905); Cleveland Naps (1906)

John "Happy" Townsend (April 9, 1879 – December 21, 1963), was a Major League Baseball pitcher from 1901 to 1906. He played for the Philadelphia Phillies, Washington Senators, and Cleveland Naps.

Townsend started his career with the Phillies in 1901, but after the season he jumped to Washington of the new American League. He pitched there for four seasons, finishing with a record of 22–69. In 1904, he led the league in both losses (26) and wild pitches (19).

In 2005, the Delaware Sports Museum and Hall of Fame inducted Townsend.
