= Kip Selbach =

American baseball player (1872–1956)

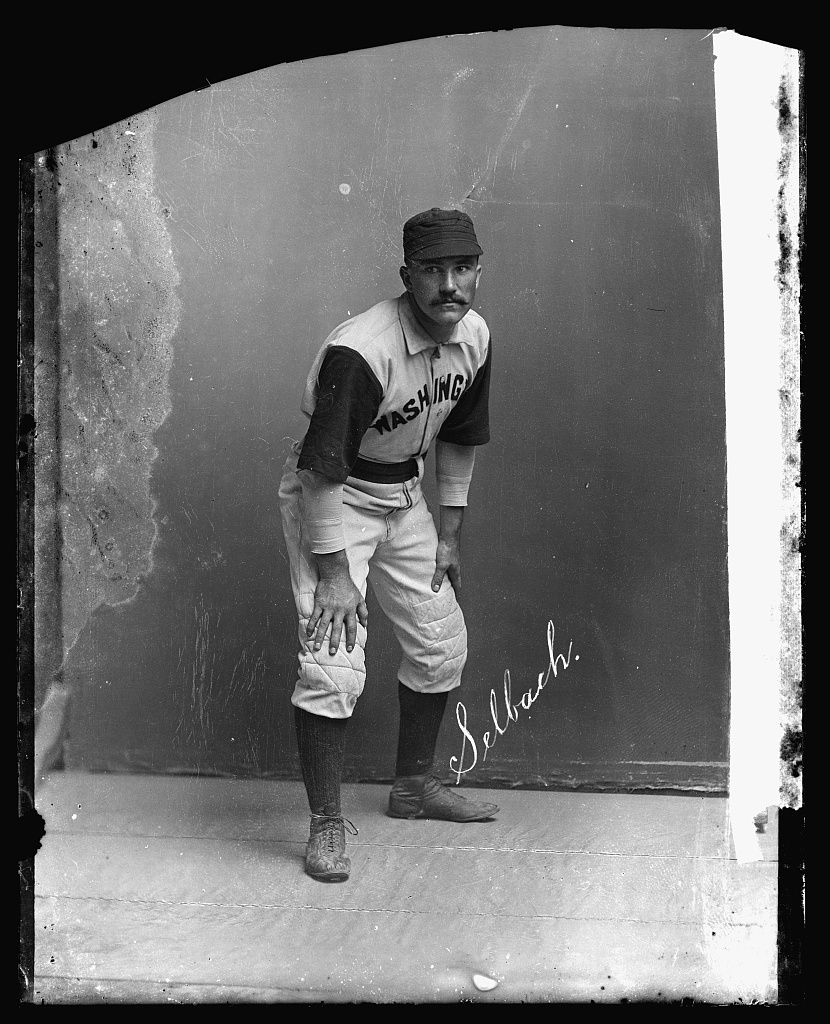
- Outfielder
- Born: March 24, 1872; Columbus, Ohio, U.S.
- Died: February 17, 1956 (aged 83); Columbus, Ohio, U.S.
- Batted: Right Threw: Right

MLB debut
- April 24, 1894, for the Washington Senators

Last MLB appearance
- June 29, 1906, for the Boston Americans

MLB statistics
- Batting average: .293
- Home runs: 44
- Runs batted in: 779
- Stolen bases: 334

Teams
- Washington Senators (NL) (1894–1898); Cincinnati Reds (1899); New York Giants (1900–1901); Baltimore Orioles (1902); Washington Senators (AL) (1903–1904); Boston Americans (1904–1906)

Albert Karl (Kip) Selbach (March 24, 1872 – February 17, 1956) was a left fielder in Major League Baseball. From 1894 through 1906, he played for the Washington Senators (NL), Cincinnati Reds, New York Giants, Baltimore Orioles, Washington Senators (AL) and Boston Americans (1904–1906). Selbach batted and threw right-handed. He was born in Columbus, Ohio.

== Career ==
A strong defensive player and good contact hitter, Selbach made his debut with the Washington Senators of the National League in 1894. He hit over .300 during his first five major league seasons, with a high .322 in 1895, and in 1896 posted career-highs with 115 runs, 100 RBI, 49 stolen bases and 22 triples (a NL lead). Then, in 1897, he scored 113 runs with 25 doubles, 16 triples and 46 steals, while batting .313.

Selbach was sold by Washington to the Cincinnati Reds before the 1899 season. After hit .296 for his new team, he was sold to the New York Giants at the end of the season. With the Giants, Selbach posted career-highs with a .337 average and 176 hits in 1900, while scoring 98 runs with 36 steals.

In 1902 Selbach moved to the new American League, playing for the first Baltimore Orioles team, the new Washington Senators, and the Boston Red Sox. He enjoyed a productive season in first AL year, hitting .320 with the Orioles. After that, he played part of two seasons with Washington and ended his major league career with Boston in 1906.

On August 19, 1902, Selbach tied an MLB record in committing five errors from the outfield in one game.

In a 13-season career, Selbach was a .293 hitter with 44 home runs and 779 RBI in 1612 games played. He added 1066 runs, 1807 hits, 301 doubles, 149 triples and 334 stolen bases.

Selbach died in Columbus, Ohio, at the age of 83.

== See also ==
- List of Major League Baseball annual triples leaders
- List of Major League Baseball career triples leaders
- List of Major League Baseball career runs scored leaders
- List of Major League Baseball career stolen bases leaders
- List of Major League Baseball single-game hits leaders
