= 1904 Major League Baseball season =

1904 MLB season
- League: American League (AL); National League (NL)
- Sport: Baseball
- Duration: April 14 – October 10, 1904 (AL); April 14 – October 9, 1904 (NL)
- Games: 154
- Teams: 16 (8 per league)

Pennant winners
- AL champions: Boston Americans
- AL runners-up: New York Highlanders
- NL champions: New York Giants
- NL runners-up: Chicago Cubs

MLB seasons
- ← 1903 1905 →

Locations of teams for the 1904–1907 American League seasons
American League
Locations of teams for the 1903–1906 National League seasons
National League

The 1904 major league baseball season was contested from April 14 to October 10, 1904. The Boston Americans and New York Giants finished atop the standings for the American League and National League, respectively. There was no postseason: with still no formal arrangement in place between the two leagues, the Giants declined to meet the Americans in the 1904 World Series. Going into the season, the Americans were the defending World Series from the 1903 season.

The St. Louis Browns and Detroit Tigers played 11 consecutive games against each other in September—the first six in Detroit and the final five in St. Louis—the most games played consecutively between two teams in major league history. The Chicago White Stockings shortened their name to the Chicago White Sox.

== Schedule ==
The 1904 schedule consisted of 154 games (an increase from 140 from the previous season) for all teams in the American League and National League, each of which had eight teams. Each team was scheduled to play 22 games against the other seven teams of their respective league. This format was an adjustment to the 140-game, 20-games-each format that had been in place from the 1901 season. This format would last until 1919.

Opening Day took place on April 14 with all but the Pittsburgh Pirates and St. Louis Cardinals playing. The National League and American League would see their final day of the regular season on October 9 & 10, respectively.

== Teams ==
League	Team	City	Ballpark	Capacity	Manager
American League	Boston Americans	Boston, Massachusetts	Huntington Avenue Grounds	11,500	Jimmy Collins
American League	Chicago White Sox	Chicago, Illinois	South Side Park	14,000	Jimmy Callahan
American League	Chicago White Sox	Chicago, Illinois	South Side Park	14,000	Fielder Jones
American League	Cleveland Naps	Cleveland, Ohio	League Park (Cleveland)	9,000	Bill Armour
American League	Detroit Tigers	Detroit, Michigan	Bennett Park	8,500	Ed Barrow
American League	Detroit Tigers	Detroit, Michigan	Bennett Park	8,500	Bobby Lowe
American League	New York Highlanders	New York, New York	Hilltop Park	16,000	Clark Griffith
American League	Philadelphia Athletics	Philadelphia, Pennsylvania	Columbia Park	9,500	Connie Mack
American League	St. Louis Browns	St. Louis, Missouri	Sportsman's Park	8,000	Jimmy McAleer
American League	Washington Senators	Washington, D.C.	American League Park	7,000	Malachi Kittridge
American League	Washington Senators	Washington, D.C.	American League Park	7,000	Patsy Donovan
National League	Boston Beaneaters	Boston, Massachusetts	South End Grounds	6,600	Al Buckenberger
National League	Brooklyn Superbas	New York, New York	Washington Park	12,000	Ned Hanlon
National League	Chicago Cubs	Chicago, Illinois	West Side Park	13,000	Frank Selee
National League	Cincinnati Reds	Cincinnati, Ohio	Palace of the Fans	12,000	Joe Kelley
National League	New York Giants	New York, New York	Polo Grounds	16,000	John McGraw
National League	Philadelphia Phillies	Philadelphia, Pennsylvania	National League Park	18,000	Hugh Duffy
National League	Pittsburgh Pirates	Allegheny, Pennsylvania	Exposition Park	16,000	Fred Clarke
National League	St. Louis Cardinals	St. Louis, Missouri	League Park (St. Louis)	15,200	Kid Nichols

=== Sunday games ===
Blue laws restricted Sunday activities in several localities, causing the New York Highlanders, in a rescheduled game, to play at a ballpark in a different locality.

Team	City	Ballpark	Capacity	Games played
New York Highlanders	Newark, New Jersey	Wiedenmeyer's Park	7,000	1

1. In today's Pittsburgh, Pennsylvania.

== Standings ==
=== American League ===
American League
Team	W	L	Pct.	GB	Home	Road
Boston Americans	95	59	.617	—	49‍–‍30	46‍–‍29
New York Highlanders	92	59	.609	1½	46‍–‍29	46‍–‍30
Chicago White Sox	89	65	.578	6	50‍–‍27	39‍–‍38
Cleveland Naps	86	65	.570	7½	44‍–‍31	42‍–‍34
Philadelphia Athletics	81	70	.536	12½	47‍–‍31	34‍–‍39
St. Louis Browns	65	87	.428	29	32‍–‍43	33‍–‍44
Detroit Tigers	62	90	.408	32	34‍–‍40	28‍–‍50
Washington Senators	38	113	.252	55½	23‍–‍52	15‍–‍61

=== National League ===
National League
Team	W	L	Pct.	GB	Home	Road
New York Giants	106	47	.693	—	56‍–‍26	50‍–‍21
Chicago Cubs	93	60	.608	13	49‍–‍27	44‍–‍33
Cincinnati Reds	88	65	.575	18	49‍–‍27	39‍–‍38
Pittsburgh Pirates	87	66	.569	19	48‍–‍30	39‍–‍36
St. Louis Cardinals	75	79	.487	31½	39‍–‍36	36‍–‍43
Brooklyn Superbas	56	97	.366	50	31‍–‍44	25‍–‍53
Boston Beaneaters	55	98	.359	51	34‍–‍45	21‍–‍53
Philadelphia Phillies	52	100	.342	53½	28‍–‍43	24‍–‍57

=== Tie games ===
29 tie games (18 in AL, 11 in NL), which are not factored into winning percentage or games behind (and were often replayed again), occurred throughout the season.

==== American League ====
- Boston Americans, 3
- Chicago White Sox, 2
- Cleveland Naps, 3
- Detroit Tigers, 10
- New York Highlanders, 4
- Philadelphia Athletics, 4
- St. Louis Browns, 4
- Washington Senators, 6

==== National League ====
- Boston Beaneaters, 2
- Brooklyn Superbas, 1
- Chicago Cubs, 3
- Cincinnati Reds, 4
- New York Giants, 5
- Philadelphia Phillies, 3
- Pittsburgh Pirates, 3
- St. Louis Cardinals, 1

== Postseason ==
No postseason was held this year. With still no formal arrangement in place between the two leagues regarding the staging of the World Series, the New York Giants refused to play against the Boston Americans or any other team from what they considered an inferior league.

== Managerial changes ==
=== Off-season ===
Team	Former Manager	New Manager
Philadelphia Phillies	Chief Zimmer	Hugh Duffy
St. Louis Cardinals	Patsy Donovan	Kid Nichols
Washington Senators	Tom Loftus	Malachi Kittridge

=== In-season ===
Team	Former Manager	New Manager
Chicago White Stockings	Jimmy Callahan	Fielder Jones
Detroit Tigers	Ed Barrow	Bobby Lowe
Washington Senators	Malachi Kittridge	Patsy Donovan

== League leaders ==
Any team shown in small text indicates a previous team a player was on during the season.

=== American League ===
Hitting leaders
Stat	Player	Total
AVG	Nap Lajoie (CLE)	.376
OPS	Nap Lajoie (CLE)	.959
HR	Harry Davis (PHA)	10
RBI	Nap Lajoie (CLE)	102
R	Patsy Dougherty (NYH/BOS)	113
H	Nap Lajoie (CLE)	208
SB	Harry Bay (CLE); Elmer Flick (CLE)	38

Pitching leaders
Stat	Player	Total
W	Jack Chesbro^{1} (NYH)	41
L	Happy Townsend (WSH)	26
ERA	Addie Joss (CLE)	1.59
K	Rube Waddell (PHA)	349
IP	Jack Chesbro (NYH)	454.2
SV	Casey Patten (WSH)	3
WHIP	Cy Young (BOS)	0.937

^{1} Modern (1901–present) single-season wins record

=== National League ===
Hitting leaders
Stat	Player	Total
AVG	Honus Wagner (PIT)	.349
OPS	Honus Wagner (PIT)	.944
HR	Harry Lumley (BRO)	9
RBI	Bill Dahlen (NYG)	80
R	George Browne (PIT)	99
H	Ginger Beaumont (PIT)	185
SB	Honus Wagner (PIT)	53

Pitching leaders
Stat	Player	Total
W	Joe McGinnity (NYG)	35
L	Vic Willis (BSN); Oscar Jones (BRO)	25
ERA	Joe McGinnity (NYG)	1.61
K	Christy Mathewson (NYG)	212
IP	Joe McGinnity (NYG)	408.0
SV	Joe McGinnity (NYG)	5
WHIP	Joe McGinnity (NYG)	0.963

== Milestones ==
=== Batters ===
==== Cycles ====
- Duff Cooley (BSN):
  - Cooley hit for his first cycle and second in franchise history, in game two of a doubleheader on June 20 against the Philadelphia Phillies.
- Sam Mertes (NYG):
  - Mertes hit for his first cycle, the fourth cycle in franchise history, and the third reverse cycle in major league history, in game one of a doubleheader on October 4 against the St. Louis Cardinals.

==== Other batting accomplishments ====
- Frank Chance (CHC):
  - Chance is hit by a pitch five times in a doubleheader against the Cincinnati Reds on May 30, by Jack Harper and Win Kellum.
- George Davis (CWS):
  - Recorded his 500th career stolen base against the St. Louis Browns on July 1. He became the 13th player to reach this mark.

=== Pitchers ===
==== Perfect games ====
- Cy Young (BOS):
  - Young pitched the third perfect game in major league history and the first in franchise history on May 5 against the Philadelphia Athletics. Young struck out eight in the 3–0 victory.

==== No-hitters ====
- Jesse Tannehill (BOS):
  - Tannehill threw his first career no-hitter and the second no-hitter in franchise history, by defeating the Chicago White Sox 6–0 on August 17. Tannehill walked one, hit one by pitch, and struck out four.

==== Other pitching accomplishments ====
- Cy Young (BOS):
  - Became the first member of the 400-win club, defeating the Philadelphia Athletics on September 20, winning 11–1.

== Home field attendance ==
Team name	Wins	%±	Home attendance	%±	Per game
Boston Americans	95	4.4%	623,295	64.3%	7,695
New York Giants	106	26.2%	609,826	5.2%	7,260
Chicago White Stockings	89	48.3%	557,123	94.7%	7,143
Philadelphia Athletics	81	8.0%	512,294	21.3%	6,485
Chicago Cubs	93	13.4%	439,100	13.7%	5,629
New York Highlanders	92	27.8%	438,919	107.2%	5,852
Cincinnati Reds	88	18.9%	391,915	11.4%	4,961
St. Louis Cardinals	75	74.4%	386,750	70.7%	5,089
Pittsburgh Pirates	87	−4.4%	340,615	4.2%	4,367
St. Louis Browns	65	0.0%	318,108	−16.4%	4,078
Cleveland Naps	86	11.7%	264,749	−14.9%	3,394
Brooklyn Superbas	56	−20.0%	214,600	−4.5%	2,824
Detroit Tigers	62	−4.6%	177,796	−20.8%	2,251
Philadelphia Phillies	52	6.1%	140,771	−7.2%	1,928
Boston Beaneaters	55	−5.2%	140,694	−1.7%	1,781
Washington Senators	38	−11.6%	131,744	2.2%	1,689

== Venues ==
The Washington Senators leave American League Park (where they played three seasons) and move into a new American League Park, where they would go on to play seven seasons through 1910.

The New York Highlanders play one game at Wiedenmeyer's Park in Newark, New Jersey on Sunday, July 17, as a makeup between them and the Detroit Tigers and to avoid New York City's blue laws.

== See also ==
- 1904 in baseball (Events, Births, Deaths)
