= Music of Massachusetts =

Massachusetts is a U.S. state in New England. The music of Massachusetts has developed actively since it was first colonized by Britain. The city of Boston is an especially large part of the state's present music scene, which includes several genres of rock, as well as classical, folk, and hip hop music.

== Concert music ==
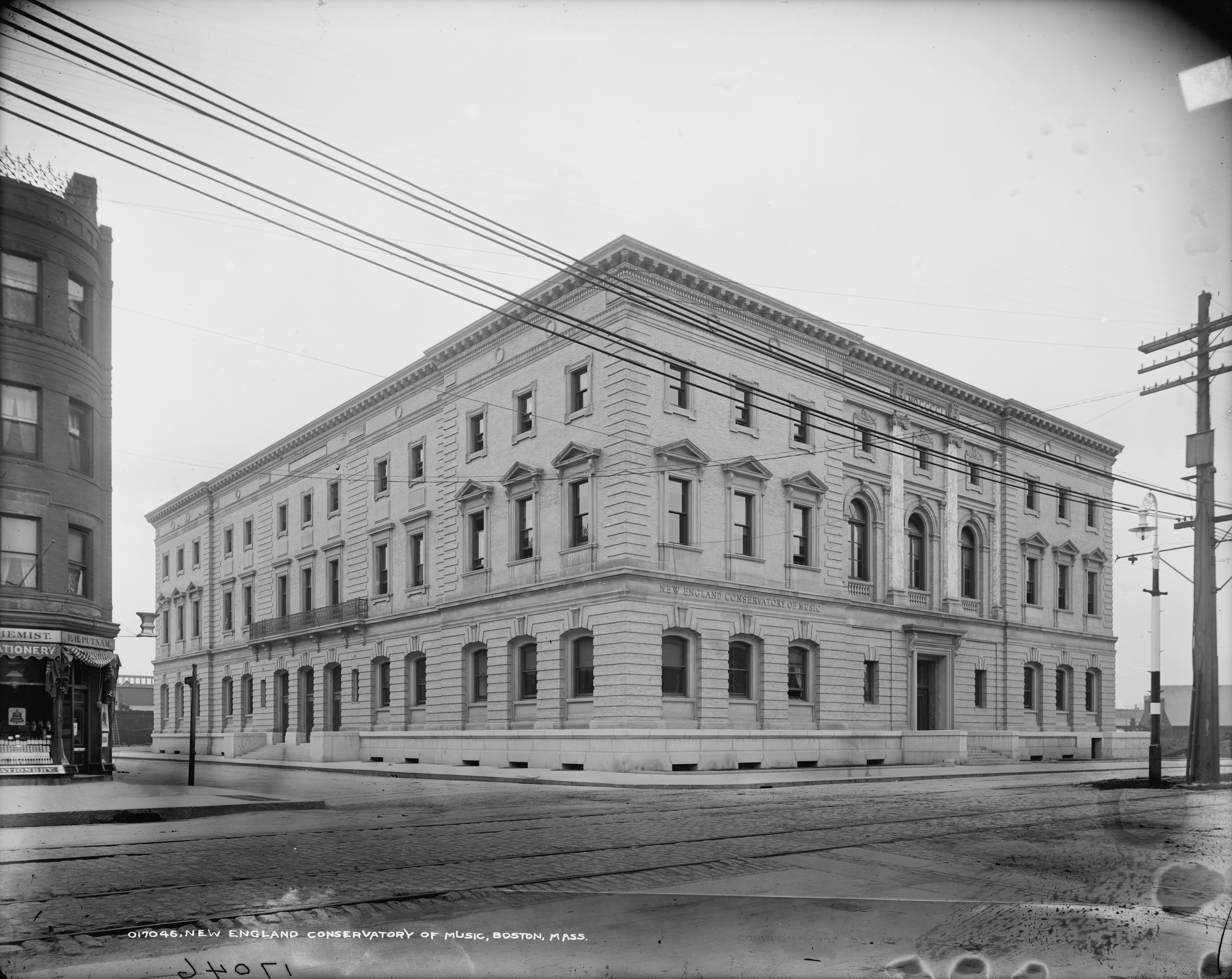
New England Conservatory of Music in Boston.

Perhaps the most influential early composer of the United States was Lowell Mason. A native of Boston, Mason campaigned against the use of shape-note notation, and for the education in standard notation. He worked with local institutions to release collections of hymns and maintain his stature. Opposed to the shape-note tradition, Mason pushed American music towards a European model.

The Bay Psalm Book (The Whole Booke of Psalmes Faithfully Translated into English Metre) was published in Cambridge, Massachusetts, in 1640; it was the first book of any kind printed in the English colonies of North America. It became the standard used by New England churches for many years, though it contained no music itself, merely providing psalms and pointing readers to other prominent publications. The Bay Psalm Book was faithful to its source, but did not produce beautiful singing. In 1651, then, a third edition was created, and became known as the New England Psalm Book; this became the standard for many years. By this point, the evolution from the Ainsworth Psalter to the New England Psalm Book had steadily dwindled the number of tunes in use.

Massachusetts was later home to a number of the most prominent members of the First New England School of itinerant singing masters, including Daniel Read (later of New Haven, Connecticut) and Supply Belcher (later of Farmington, Maine).

Massachusetts is home to several formal ensembles: Boston Symphony Orchestra, Boston Pops Orchestra, Boston Lyric Opera, and Tanglewood Festival Chorus. Formal institutions for the perpetuation of formal music exist in the state as well: Boston Conservatory, Longy School of Music, New England Conservatory, and Berklee College of Music.

Choral music has been a major part of concert life with two of the oldest choral organizations in the United States based in Massachusetts: Stoughton Musical Society, founded in 1786, and Handel and Haydn Society, founded in 1815.

== Sea shanties ==
As Massachusetts has long maintained a great maritime tradition from the early colonial fishermen to its importance in the whaling industry in the nineteenth century, songs of the sea have been prominent in the state's musical heritage. Traditional English sea shanties were brought to New England and preserved by colonial American seamen. A New England version of the sea shanty "Spanish Ladies" changes 'England' to 'New England' or, in some versions, 'Boston' or 'New Bedford', and 'British sailors' to 'Yankee Whalermen'.

== Folk music ==
Folklorists who have collected traditional music of Massachusetts include Eloise Hubbard Linscott, whose field recordings from 1938 and 1941 are in the Library of Congress American Folklife Center.

A number of musicians with ties to the American folk music revival have Massachusetts connections. While a teenager living in Belmont, Joan Baez gave her first concert at the Club 47 in Cambridge. James Taylor was born in Boston, but later moved to North Carolina before once again relocating to Martha's Vineyard. He now lives in the town of Lenox. Paul Clayton from New Bedford, best known for his song "Gotta Travel On", was a minor figure in the folk revival. Both Bill Staines, who grew up in Lexington, and Bonnie Raitt, who attended college in Cambridge, were influenced by the folk revival through the concerts at Club 47.

The diverse contemporary Massachusetts folk music scene includes musicians such as David Coffin, who specializes in early music and sea music; Lui Collins, a folk singer-songwriter; Vance Gilbert, a folk singer with a background in jazz; and Aoife Clancy, formerly of Cherish the Ladies, who sings traditional Irish and contemporary folk songs. It also includes Ellis Paul, a singer-songwriter who came onto the Boston music scene in the late 1980s after arriving at Boston College on a track scholarship. Since then he has been the recipient of 14 Boston Music Awards.

According to the New England Folk Network Web site, Massachusetts hosts more than a dozen annual folk music festivals. Of these, the Lowell Folk Festival claims to be the biggest free folk festival in the United States, while the New England Folk Festival, which began in 1944, may be the longest-running festival in the state. Festivals may include folk music from a wide diversity of cultures. For example, the 2007 New England Folk Festival included Bulgarian, Japanese, and Swedish music, and the 2007 Working Waterfront Festival included Portuguese fado music and Mexican norteño.

== Jazz ==
Jazz musicians born in Massachusetts include pianist and composer Irene Higginbotham, multi-instrumentalist Jaki Byard, multi-instrumentalist Bill Dixon, saxophonist and clarinetist Harry Carney, bassist Teddy Kotick, pianist Barbara Carroll, pianist Ralph Burns, keyboardist Chick Corea, trumpeter Max Kaminsky, tenor saxophonist Paul Gonsalves, alto saxophonists Johnny Hodges and Phil Woods, singer Nnenna Freelon, multi-instrumentalist Teddy Charles, drummer and vibraphonist Johnny Rae, pianist Ran Blake, soprano saxophonist and composer Jane Ira Bloom, drummer Terri Lyne Carrington, and saxophonist Carol Sudhalter.

Pat Metheny, though originally from the midwest, has spent most of his career based in Massachusetts.

== R&B ==
Doo-wop group The G-Clefs were from Roxbury. The Tune Weavers formed in Woburn.

Jonzun Crew was an electro and early funk–hip hop group that was active in the 1980s in Boston.

The R&B group New Edition is from the Roxbury neighborhood of Boston. Masspike Miles is also from Roxbury.

== Hip-hop ==
Massachusetts has produced a number of notable hip-hop artists since the birth of hip-hop, including:

- Bell Biv DeVoe
- Cousin Stizz
- Ed O.G.
- Gang Starr
- Joyner Lucas
- New Edition
- Statik Selektah

== Rock ==
The Remains and The Rockin' Ramrods formed in Boston. The Barbarians formed in Cape Cod and The Shames formed in Ipswich.

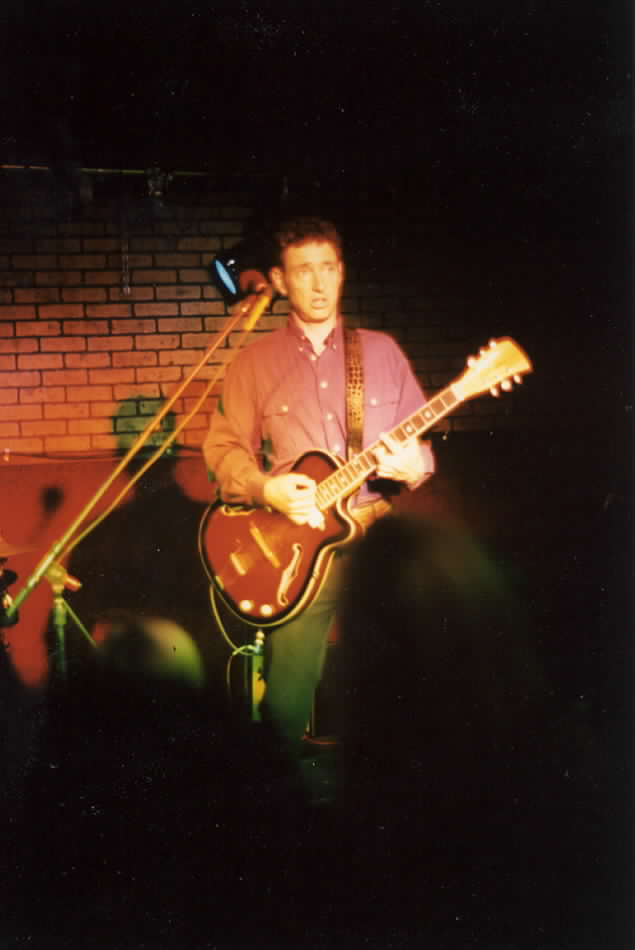
Jonathan Richman

The Modern Lovers, featuring Jonathan Richman, David Robinson (later of The Cars), and (for a short time) Jerry Harrison of Talking Heads, came out of Boston, as did more mainstream acts like Aerosmith, The Cars, and Boston. The J. Geils Band formed at Worcester Polytechnic Institute, before adding Peter Wolf and Stephen Jo Bladd from Boston band The Hallucinations to the lineup.

Paul Pena was born in Hyannis and attended Clark University in Worcester. He played gigs at the Holden experiment with Bonnie Raitt and other Worcester folkies. He went on to play with T. Bone Walker and wrote the 1970s Steve Miller Band hit "Jet Airliner".

The Real Kids formed in 1972. From the North Shore were the Nervous Eaters who formed in 1977. They were managed by The Rathskeller in Kenmore Square and released two 45s on the club's RAT label.

=== Alternative rock ===
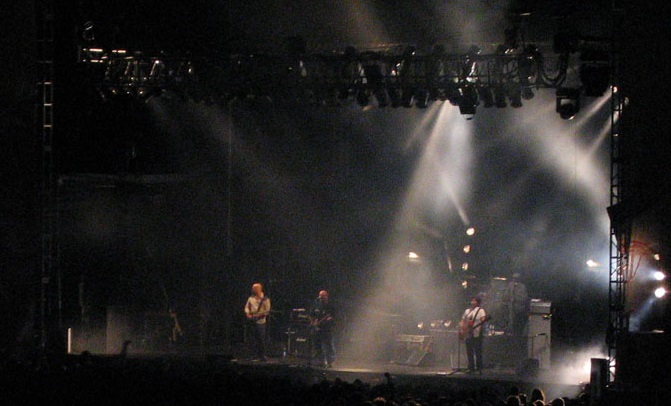
Pixies

The earliest alternative rock bands in Massachusetts hailed from Boston and included Salem 66, The Neighborhoods, The Neats, Uzi, Volcano Suns, Human Sexual Response, La Peste, and Mission of Burma. Later bands from eastern Massachusetts included Pixies, Morphine, Galaxie 500, Swirlies, and the Pernice Brothers. Farther west, in Amherst, the dissolution of the legendary hardcore punk band Deep Wound spurred the foundation of future legends Sebadoh and Dinosaur Jr. from its ashes. Amherst and neighboring Northampton also spawned the Scud Mountain Boys, Buffalo Tom, and Lo Fine.

Other notable rock bands and musicians include:

- Adam Granduciel
- A Loss for Words
- All That Remains
- Aloud
- American Hi-Fi
- Apollo Sunshine
- A Rocket to the Moon
- Bang Camaro
- Belly
- Big D and the Kids Table
- Billy Squier
- Blake Babies
- Tracy Bonham
- Boston
- Boys Like Girls
- Chucklehead
- Come
- Converge
- Cul de Sac
- Dick Dale
- Dispatch
- Dream Theater
- Dropkick Murphys
- Drop Nineteens
- Ed's Redeeming Qualities
- Energy
- Extreme
- Face to Face
- Figures on a Beach
- Four Year Strong
- The Freeze
- Godsmack
- Guster
- Hallelujah the Hills
- Juliana Hatfield
- Helium
- Highly Suspect
- Human Sexual Response
- Ice Nine Kills
- Jaya the Cat
- Jim's Big Ego
- Kicked in the Head
- Killswitch Engage
- Letters to Cleo
- Lo Fine
- Lyres
- Orpheus
- Outpatients
- Amanda Palmer
- Passion Pit
- Piebald
- Powerman 5000
- PVRIS
- Revocation
- Rob Zombie
- Scruffy The Cat
- Shadows Fall
- Speedy Ortiz
- Staind
- State Radio
- Street Dogs
- Sunburned Hand of the Man
- Swirlies
- 'Til Tuesday
- The Blackjacks
- The Click Five
- The Del Fuegos
- The Dogmatics
- The Dresden Dolls
- The Ducky Boys
- The Fools
- The Hotelier
- The Kings of Nuthin'
- The Lemonheads
- The Magnetic Fields
- The Mighty Mighty Bosstones
- The Push Stars
- The Receiving End of Sirens
- The Sheila Divine
- The Stompers
- Therefore I Am
- The Unband
- They Might Be Giants
- Tiberius (band)
- Transit
- Tribe
- Vanna
- The Venetia Fair
- Westbound Train
- Will Dailey
- Willie Alexander

Musicians from Massachusetts with a #1 Billboard Hot 100 hit include: Donna Summer (d.2012) 4 #1 disco hits from '78-'79 (like "Hot Stuff)"; New Kids on the Block 3 #1 hits (like "Step by Step"); Aerosmith ("I Don't Want to Miss a Thing"), Boston ("Amanda"), The J. Geils Band ("Centerfold"), Extreme ("More Than Words"), Bobby Brown ("My Prerogative"), Marky Mark and the Funky Bunch ("Good Vibrations"), and Meghan Trainor ("All About That Bass" in 2014). Aerosmith co-lead guitarist Brad Whitford graduated from the Berklee College of Music in Boston in 1971. 'Til Tuesday lead singer Aimee Mann also attended Berklee. Boston guitarist and founder Tom Scholz graduated from Massachusetts Institute of Technology.

== See also ==
- List of songs about Boston
