= Tessie (disambiguation) =

Tessie is the title of both a circa 1902 song that was an early anthem of the Boston Red Sox, and a 2004 song by the punk rock group Dropkick Murphys.

Tessie may also refer to:

- Tessie (given name), a feminine given name or nickname
- Tessie (EP), a 2004 EP by the Dropkick Murphys
- Tessie (film), a 1925 American silent comedy drama film
- Tahoe Tessie, a mythical creature said to dwell in Lake Tahoe, located in Nevada and California
- Tessie, the brand name of the veterinary anxiolytic drug tasipimidine

== See also ==
- Tessy (disambiguation)
