= List of songs about Boston =

This article lists songs about Boston, Massachusetts, including those set there, named after a location or feature of the city, or about a notable figure associated with the city. It is not intended to include songs where Boston is simply "name-checked" along with various other cities.

- "All Kindsa Girls" by Real Kids
- "An Open Letter to Boston" by Mark Lind & The Unloved
- "As We Walk to Fenway Park in Boston Town" by Jonathan Richman
- "Back Bay Shuffle" by Artie Shaw
- "Back to Boston" by The Rosebuds
- "Bank of Boston Beauty Queen" by The Dresden Dolls
- "Beantown" by John Cena
- "Bigger Things in Mind" by Westbound Train
- "Bill Lee" (Boston Red Sox pitcher, 1969–1978) by Warren Zevon
- "Blue Thunder" by Galaxie 500
- "Billy Ruane" by Varsity Drag (Ben Deily)
- "Boston" by Augustana
- "Boston" by The Byrds
- "Boston" by The Dresden Dolls
- "Boston" by Ed O.G.
- "Boston" by emmet swimming
- "Boston" by Kenny Chesney
- "Boston" by Patty Griffin
- "Boston" by Paulson
- "Boston" by Stella Lefty
- "Boston (Ladies of Cambridge)" by Vampire Weekend
- "Boston and St. John's" by Great Big Sea
- "Boston Asphalt" by the Dropkick Murphys
- "Boston Babies" by G.B.H.
- "Boston Babies" by Slaughter & The Dogs
- "Boston Band" by Jim's Big Ego
- "Boston Belongs To Me" by Death Before Dishonor
- "The Boston Beguine" by Sheldon Harnick
- "Boston Bound" by The Kings of Nuthin'
- "Boston Jail" by Porter Wagoner
- "A Boston Peace" by Say Anything
- "Boston Rag" by Steely Dan
- "Boston Rose" by Liam Reilly
- "Boston Tea Party" by Alex Harvey (and, more recently, by Fish)
- "The Boston Tea Party" by Jimmy Dorsey,(Decca, DLA-456-A)
- "Boston United" by The Unseen
- "Boston, USA" by The Ducky Boys
- "Bostons" by Have Heart
- "Bridges, Squares" by Ted Leo and the Pharmacists
- "Carl Yastrzemski" by Jess Cain
- "The Chosen Few" by the Dropkick Murphys
- "Christmas Time" by the Dogmatics (takes place in Kenmore Square)
- "Crutch" by Buffalo Tom
- "Devils in Boston" by Samantha Crain
- "Dirty Water" by The Standells
- "The End of Radio" by Shellac
- "Etoh" by The Avalanches
- "Fairmount Hill" by the Dropkick Murphys
- "Feelin' Massachusetts" by The Juliana Hatfield Three
- "The Fenway" by Jonathan Richman (Jonathan Richman and the Modern Lovers)
- "The Fix is In" by OK Go
- "Fly Into the Mystery" by Jonathan Richman (The Modern Lovers)
- "For Boston" originally by T.J. Hurley (and, more recently, by the Dropkick Murphys)
- "For Boston" by The Hold Steady
- "Girlfriend" by Jonathan Richman (The Modern Lovers)
- "Going to Boston" (also "Goodbye Girls, I'm Going to Boston"), traditional folksong
- "Going Out in Style" by the Dropkick Murphys
- "Government Center" by Jonathan Richman (The Modern Lovers)
- "Hey Nineteen" by Steely Dan
- "Homecoming King" by Guster
- "I Hate Boston" by Reneé Rapp
- "I Want My City Back" by The Mighty Mighty Bosstones
- "The Ice of Boston" by The Dismemberment Plan
- "I'm Shipping up to Boston" by Woody Guthrie and the Dropkick Murphys from The Warrior's Code 2005, music video filmed in East Boston, (Celtic punk)
- "I'm Yours Boston" by Big D and the Kids Table
- "In Defense of Dorchester" by the Street Dogs
- "Just Like Larry" by Dispatch (subject of the song is former Boston Celtic and Basketball Hall of Famer Larry Bird)
- "Knights of Bostonia" by State Radio
- "L.A." by Couch
- "Land of the Glass Pinecones" by Human Sexual Response
- "Logan to Government Center" by Brand New
- "Lost in Boston" by The Walkmen
- "M.T.A." by The Kingston Trio
- "Mass Ave" by Tanya Donelly
- "Mass Ave" by Willie Alexander
- "Mass Pike" by The Get Up Kids
- "Massachusetts Avenue" by Amanda Palmer & The Grand Theft Orchestra
- "Memory Motel" by The Rolling Stones
- "Mess" by Noah Kahan
- "Midnight Rambler" by The Rolling Stones
- "Modern World" by Jonathan Richman (The Modern Lovers)
- "A More Perfect Union" by Titus Andronicus
- "My Boston" by Big Shug
- "My Hometown" by The Kings of Nuthin'
- "My Sister" by Juliana Hatfield
- "Never Alone" by Dropkick Murphys
- "No Future (Death or Jail)" by Mark Lind
- "Normal Town" by Better Than Ezra
- "Pipe Bomb on Lansdowne Street" by the Dropkick Murphys
- "Please Come to Boston" by Dave Loggins
- "The Rascal King" by The Mighty Mighty Bosstones
- "Revolving Doors" by Gorillaz
- "Ride on Down the Highway" by Jonathan Richman (The Modern Lovers)
- "Riot on Broad Street" by The Mighty Mighty Bosstones
- "Roadrunner" by Jonathan Richman (The Modern Lovers)
- "Rock and Roll Band" by Boston
- "Roslindale" by Birdbrain
- "Savin Hill" by Street Dogs
- "Sharkey's Day" by Laurie Anderson
- "She's From Boston" by Kenny Chesney
- "She's Got a Boyfriend Now" by Boys Like Girls
- "Shining On" by Big D and the Kids Table
- "Shot Heard 'Round the World" by Ween (originally from Schoolhouse Rock)
- "Skinhead on the MBTA" by the Dropkick Murphys
- "Southeast of Boston" by June of 44
- "South End Incident" by The Beacon Street Union
- "The State of Massachusetts" by Dropkick Murphys
- "Steady Riot" by Big D and the Kids Table
- "Street by Street" by Laufey (singer)
- "Subway" by Mary Lou Lord
- "Sweet Baby James" by James Taylor
- "T DJ" by Freezepop
- "Tessie" by Dropkick Murphys
- "There's A Black Hole in the Shadow of The Pru" by American Nightmare
- "They Came To Boston" by The Mighty Mighty Bosstones
- "This Is Boston, Not L.A." by The Freeze
- "The Warrior's Code" by Dropkick Murphys (subject of the song is boxer Micky Ward)
- "Time To Go" by Dropkick Murphys
- "Twilight in Boston" by Jonathan Richman
- "Two Soldiers" by Bob Dylan
- "Walkaways" by Counting Crows
- "Walk Up the Street" by Jonathan Richman (The Modern Lovers)
- "Whoever's in New England" by Reba McEntire
- "Why Do I" by Will Dailey
- "Wicked Little Critta" by They Might Be Giants
- "Winter Afternoon by B.U. in Boston" by Jonathan Richman
- "Young New England" by Transit
