= Tessy =

Tessy may refer to:

== People ==
- Tessy Antony de Nassau (born 1985), Luxembourgish businesswoman and non-profit executive, a former member of the Grand Ducal Family of Luxembourg
- Tessy Bamberg-Schitter (born 1980), Luxembourgish football midfielder
- Tessy María López Goerne (born 1961), Mexican nanotechnologist
- Tessy Ojo (born 1971), British-Nigerian charity executive
- Tessy Okoli (born c. 1966), Nigerian educator
- Tessy Scholtes (born 1981), Luxembourgish karateka and politician
- Tessy van de Ven (born 1983), Dutch former professional tennis player

== Places ==
- Épagny Metz-Tessy, commune in the Haute-Savoie department of southeastern France since 2016
- Metz-Tessy, former commune in the Haute-Savoie department of southeastern France, merged into Épagny Metz-Tessy
- Tessy-Bocage, commune in the Manche department of northwestern France since 2016
- Tessy-sur-Vire, former commune in the Manche department of northwestern France, merged into Tessy-Bocage

== See also ==
- Tess (disambiguation)
- Tessie (disambiguation)
