= Schitter =

Schitter is a German surname. Notable people with the surname include:

- Balthasar Schitter (1793–1868), Austrian Catholic prelate and auxiliary bishop
- Tessy Bamberg-Schitter (born 1980), Luxembourgian footballer
