= L Street Brownies =

Winter swimming club in South Boston, United States

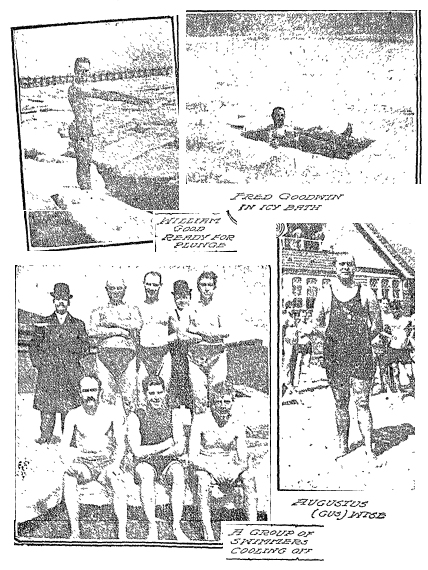
L Street Brownies, 1913.

The L Street Brownies are a polar bear club based in South Boston, Massachusetts. Organized in 1902, it is one of the oldest such clubs in the United States. Although the Brownies swim year round, they are best known for their annual New Year's Day plunge in Dorchester Bay.

== History ==
Winter swimming in South Boston began in the 19th century, by some accounts as early as 1865. The practice was likely introduced by European immigrants, who believed that cold water plunges followed by saunas or steam baths were good for one's health. Swimmers who came regularly to the L Street Bathhouse in South Boston usually swam nude or with minimal clothing, and became known as the "Brownies" because of the deep tans they acquired from daily exposure to the sun. The Brownies claimed that swimming and tanning were beneficial to the heart, skin, and circulation, and credited the practice with miraculous cures. The belief that winter swimming strengthens the immune system has persisted into the 21st century.

=== Founding ===
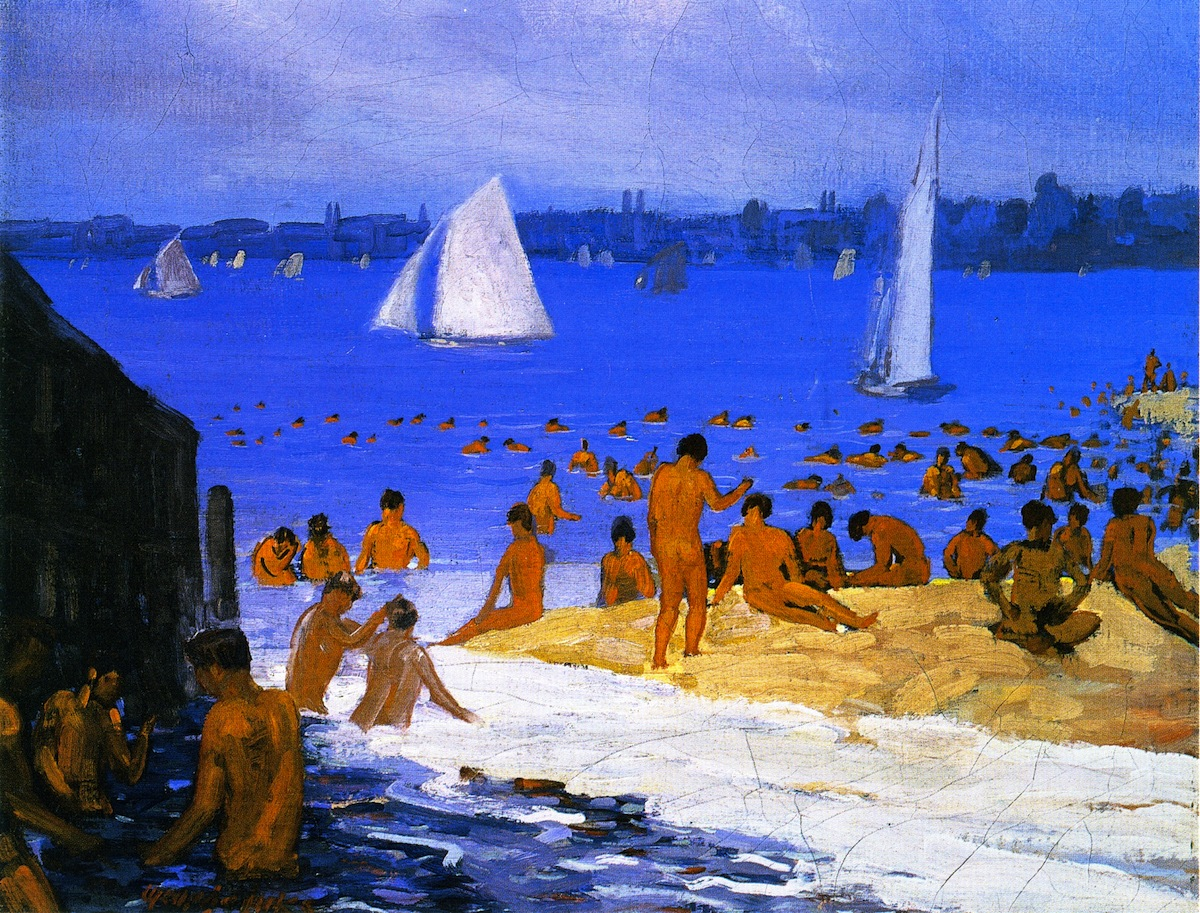
L Street Brownies by George Luks, 1922.

The club was officially organized in 1902, and began accepting women members in 1915. Although the club itself is older than the Coney Island Polar Bear Club, which was founded in 1903, its first documented New Year's Day swim did not take place until 1904, when a photographer took a picture of the event. For this reason, the title of "oldest polar bear club in the United States" is generally given to the Coney Island club.

The New Year's Day swim became an annual tradition that continues to this day. Each year hundreds of people join the L Street Brownies in their New Year's Day swim, accompanied by spectators and reporters. Traditionally, the most dedicated Brownies swam every day of the year, rain or shine. The daily ritual was so important to them that in 1913, according to the Boston Globe, it was "not unusual at L St, after an extremely cold night", when the bay was covered with ice, "to see a naked bather plodding through the snow armed with a hatchet or ax for the purpose of cutting out a space large enough for a dip." One such member, Richard Pinkson, had reportedly been an L Street Brownie for 64 years when he died in 1955.

=== The L Street Bathhouse ===
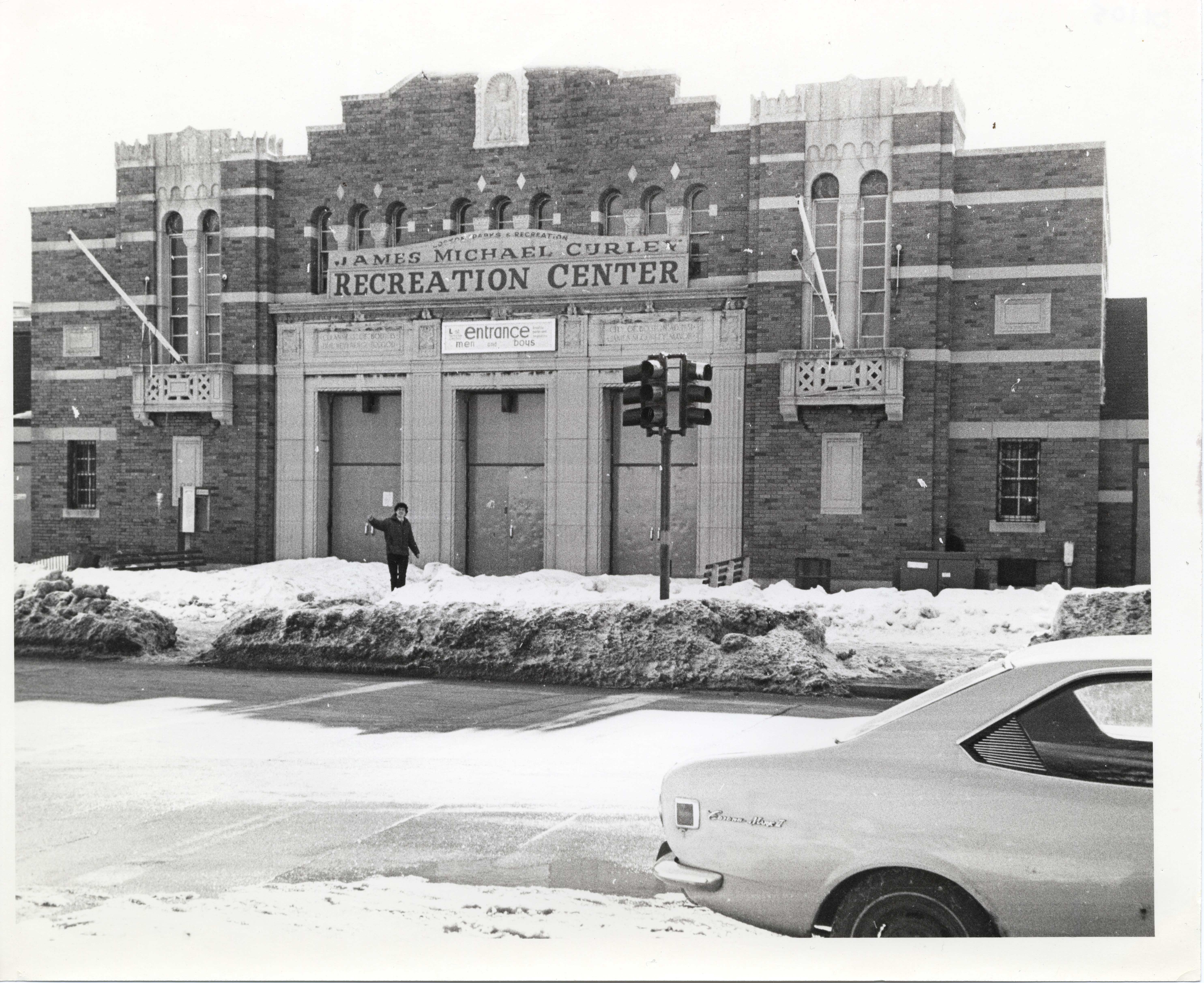
L Street Bathhouse, 1970s

The L Street Bathhouse stands at L Street and Day Boulevard in South Boston, facing Carson Beach (or the L Street Beach, as that part of the beach is sometimes called). The original bathhouse was one of several built by the city in 1866 to enable poor immigrants, who lived in tenements with no indoor plumbing, to bathe regularly. The motto "Cleanliness of Body Is Next to Godliness" was inscribed above the building's entrance. The bathhouse was rebuilt by Mayor Curley in 1931, and is officially known as the Curley Community Center. In the 1970s, during Kevin White's administration, the women's half of the bathhouse was converted into temporary classrooms. Under Mayor Raymond Flynn, the whole building was renovated and turned into a fitness center, and women were once again allowed to join.

=== The Boston Light Swim ===
The L Street Brownies organized many swimming and rowing competitions, including annual swimming races on Christmas Day. The most popular race, however, took place in the summer: a 10-mile swim to Boston Light, a lighthouse on Little Brewster Island in outer Boston Harbor. The original course began at the Charlestown Bridge, ran east of Governor's Island, west of Long Island, west of Georges Island, and finished at the lighthouse. Known as the "Boston Light", the race drew thousands of spectators each year and attracted national publicity until the onset of World War II, when it was discontinued. Since then, the race has been revived several times. The new course starts at Boston Light and ends at the L Street Bathhouse, covering a distance of 8 miles.

Peter S. McNally, a world champion long-distance swimmer, made the first recorded attempt to swim Boston Light in 1898. In 1907, during Old Home Week, three more men attempted the swim: Samuel Richards, Commodore Alfred Brown, and Louis Jacot. Richards and Brown dropped out, making Jacot the first winner of the Boston Light, despite not actually reaching the lighthouse finish line. Richards went on to win the competition in 1911 and 1912, and in 1913 made headlines when he swam from the Charlestown Bridge to Boston Light and back, a distance of approximately 24 miles, in 13 hours and 9 minutes.

In 1909, the Austrian-born Alois Anderlé swam to Boston Light in 5 hours and 38 minutes, completing the last half mile in a severe thunderstorm. He was later disqualified because his navigator had steered him over Nix's Mate, a small island which was barely submerged at the time, forcing him to walk the short distance across it. The following year, 15-year-old Rose Pitonof of Dorchester completed the course in 6 hours and 50 minutes, defeating seven men. Her father and brother navigated her over an irregular course that stretched the distance to 12 or 13 miles through choppy, frigid waters. By the time she finished, cold and fatigue had forced all the other contestants to drop out.

The Bavarian-born Charlie Toth, a waiter at the Westminster Hotel near Copley Square, won the Boston Light in 1914, completing the course in 6 hours and 48 minutes. He won again in 1916 and 1921. In 1915, Toth swam from Charlestown to Graves Light and on to Revere Beach, a distance of about 24 miles, in 12 hours and 49 minutes. Toth held the American endurance record for a time, and famously trained for his English Channel swim in 1923 by towing a rowboat full of passengers. Other notable Boston Light competitors have included James J. Doty (for whom the Doty Memorial Mile Swim is named), Olympic swimmer Marian Gilman, Eva Morrison, and Henry Sullivan.

The Boston Light Swim is now organized and sponsored independently of the L Street Brownies.

== Notable members ==
- Michael T. McGreevy (1865–1943), leader of the Royal Rooters
- Samuel Richards (1875–?), long distance swimmer
- Alexander N. Rossolimo, think tank executive
