= Ciao My Shining Star: The Songs of Mark Mulcahy =

2009 tribute album

Ciao My Shining Star: The Songs of Mark Mulcahy is a tribute album to former Polaris and Miracle Legion front man Mark Mulcahy. It was released on the Shout! Factory label on September 29, 2009.

More than 30 artists recorded exclusive tracks for the album, intended to help Mulcahy continue making music while he was raising his three-year-old twin daughters after his wife Melissa died in 2008. Notable contributors include Michael Stipe, Black Francis (as Frank Black), Thom Yorke, Dinosaur Jr., The National, Mercury Rev, Chris Collingwood of Fountains of Wayne, and David Thomas, whose band Pere Ubu was among those who had worked or performed with Miracle Legion and/or Polaris in the past.

A deluxe edition was also released, including 20 bonus tracks over two additional CDs.

== Track listing ==
1. "All for The Best" (Thom Yorke)
2. "Ashamed of the Story I Told" (The National)
3. "Everything's Coming Undone" (Michael Stipe)
4. "Loves the Only Thing That Shuts Me Up" (David Berkeley)
5. "The Backyard" (Dinosaur Jr.)
6. "Micon the Icon" (Chris Harford & Mr Ray Neal)
7. "Bill Jocko" (Frank Black)
8. "Little Man" (Vic Chesnutt)
9. "Ciao My Shining Star" (Unbelievable Truth)
10. "I Have Patience" (The Butterflies of Love)
11. "Cookie Jar" (Chris Collingwood)
12. "The Quiet One" (Frank Turner)
13. "In Pursuit of Your Happiness" (Rocket from the Tombs)
14. "Wake Up Whispering" (Ben Kweller)
15. "I Woke Up in the Mayflower" (Josh Rouse)
16. "Paradise" (The Autumn Defense)
17. "Happy Birthday Yesterday" (Hayden)
18. "We're Not in Charleston Anymore" (Juliana Hatfield)
19. "Sailors and Animals" (Mercury Rev)
20. "She Watches Over Me" (Elvis Perkins)
21. "A World Away from This One" (Sean Watkins)

== Deluxe Edition bonus track listings ==
=== CD 1 ===
1. "Gigantic Transatlantic Trunk Call" (A.C. Newman)
2. "Butterflies" (Buffalo Tom)
3. "Mr. Mingo" (Laura Veirs)
4. "Resolution #1" (Joe Purdy)
5. "Hey Self Defeater" (Syd Straw)
6. "Tempted" (The Pressure Room)
7. "Apartment Murders" (Dumptruck)
8. "4:04" (The Parkway Charlies)
9. "And Then?" (Winterpills)
10. "Be Sure" (Biet Simkin)

=== CD 2 ===
1. "Closer To The Wall" (The Gravel Pit)
2. "Country Boy" (The 'Mericans )
3. "Even Better" (The Autumn Defense)
4. "Everywhere" (Lo Fine)
5. "I Hate To Needy Need You" (TW Walsh)
6. "I Just Shot Myself in the Foot Again" (School for the Dead)
7. "Nothing But a Silver Medal" (The Slugos)
8. "Pasadena Love Story" (Spouse)
9. "The Way That She Really Is" (Senator)
10. "You're The One Lee" (The Late B.P. Helium)
