= The Meanest of Times =

Studio album by Dropkick Murphys
- Released: September 18, 2007
- Recorded: April – June 2007
- Studio: The Outpost (Stoughton)
- Genre: Celtic punk
- Length: 46:27
- Label: Born & Bred
- Producer: Dropkick Murphys

Dropkick Murphys chronology
The Warrior's Code (2005)	The Meanest of Times (2007)	Live on Lansdowne, Boston MA (2010)

Alternative cover
- Limited edition cover

Singles from The Meanest of Times
- 1. "The State of Massachusetts" Released: February 4, 2008; 2. "Johnny, I Hardly Knew Ya" Released: 2008

The Meanest of Times is the sixth studio album by American celtic punk band Dropkick Murphys. It was released on September 18, 2007, through their vanity label, Born & Bred Records, a division of Cooking Vinyl Records. The album was their first to not be released through Hellcat Records and their last to feature guitarist Marc Orrell, who left the band following the tour in support of the album. The picture on the album's cover was taken at Saint Brendan School in Dorchester, Massachusetts, close to Quincy, Massachusetts whence the band hails. The limited edition DVD includes 7 music videos and a fundraiser breakfast with Dropkick Murphys.

== Songs ==
The songs "(F)lannigan's Ball", "Fairmount Hill" and "Johnny, I Hardly Knew Ya" are based on traditional Irish tunes. The lyrics of both "(F)lannigan's Ball" (based on "Lanigan's Ball") and "Fairmount Hill" (based on "Spancil Hill") were altered. They include multiple references to places in the Boston region and people associated with the band.

"(F)lannigan's Ball" was partially recorded in the Westland Studios in Dublin and features guest vocals by Ronnie Drew from The Dubliners and Spider Stacy from The Pogues, two of the most iconic figures in the history of Irish folk music and Folk punk, respectively. The song is dedicated to Drew's wife Deirdre, who had died one month before it was recorded. It was also the last song Ronnie Drew made a contribution to before he died on 16 August 2008 at the age of 73, following a long illness.

The band shot a promotional music video in 2008 for the song, "Tomorrow's Industry" which supported the United Healthcare Workers East and hospitals of Massachusetts who were fighting for free and fair union elections so their voice could be heard in the workplace and would provide a better future for their families and communities.

== Release ==
The first songs from the album were heard through the band's MySpace page starting in August 2007. The first track to appear was "(F)lannigan's Ball", which was actually a different version than what is featured on the album, as it featured vocals by Al Barr and Ken Casey rather than Ronnie Drew and Spider Stacy.

Multiple versions of the album were released, across different mediums and regions. All versions feature the same initial 15 tracks, but have different bonus tracks. The European version includes a cover of the Thin Lizzy song "Jailbreak". A deluxe vinyl edition, which features the album spread out over two 12" records, includes two bonus tracks, "Promised Land" and a cover of The Who song "Baba O'Riley". The vinyl release also includes the album on CD, but the CD only includes the first 15 tracks. The deluxe edition of the iTunes Store release includes three bonus tracks, "Forever" (acoustic version), "The Thick Skin of Defiance" and "Breakdown". The bonus tracks from the iTunes release are also available on "The State of Massachusetts" EP that was released in the UK in February 2008.

A limited-edition version of the album was released on March 11, 2008. It includes 5 bonus tracks (including the European bonus track, all three iTunes bonus tracks as well as the original version of "(F)lannigan's Ball" as well as a DVD featuring the music video for "The State of Massachusetts" along with the making of the video, clips of the band's St. Patrick's Day performance along with other behind the scene footage.

"The State of Massachusetts" is available for download in a special indie rock pack on Guitar Hero II. "Famous for Nothing", "(F)Lanningan's Ball", and "Johnny, I Hardly Knew Ya" were available as a three-song track pack on Guitar Hero III: Legends of Rock to celebrate Saint Patrick's Day but is no longer available for download.

== Reception ==
Professional ratings
Review scores
Source	Rating
Allmusic	4/5 stars
Entertainment Weekly	B+
SPIN	4/5 stars
MusicOMH	4/5 stars
AbsolutePunk.net	78%
Boston Globe	Favorable

The Meanest of Times generally received positive reviews. Allmusic said that the album was the "tightest and most developed set of songs yet" from the band, and while the Boston Globe said that it fell short of The Warrior's Code, The Meanest of Times was still "everything you want in a Murphys record." AbsolutePunk's review also said that The Meanest of Times was "not nearly the best they've ever done," but that it was still "well above-average."

On the U.S. Billboard 200 chart, the album debuted at number 20, selling about 28,000 copies in its first week. This album was #49 on Rolling Stone's list of the Top 50 Albums of 2007. The album's first single, "The State of Massachusetts", became one of the 100-most-played songs on US modern rock radio in October 2007. Also in October, the song had been added to the playlists of 18 US alternative rock stations. By January 2008, the song had become one of the 60-most-played alternative rock songs in the United States. This song was #83 on Rolling Stone's list of the 100 Best Songs of 2007.

It was awarded a silver certification from the Independent Music Companies Association which indicated sales of at least 30,000 copies throughout Europe.

== Track listing ==
All tracks are written by Dropkick Murphys, except where noted.

No.	Title	Writer(s)	Length
1.	"Famous for Nothing"		2:47
2.	"God Willing"		3:16
3.	"The State of Massachusetts"		3:52
4.	"Tomorrow's Industry"		2:19
5.	"Echoes on "A". Street"		3:17
6.	"Vices and Virtues"		2:11
7.	"Surrender"		3:15
8.	"(F)lannigan's Ball" (featuring Ronnie Drew & Spider Stacy)	Traditional, Dropkick Murphys	3:39
9.	"I'll Begin Again"		2:38
10.	"Fairmount Hill"	Traditional, Dropkick Murphys	3:58
11.	"Loyal to No One"		2:25
12.	"Shattered"		2:47
13.	"Rude Awakenings"		3:23
14.	"Johnny, I Hardly Knew Ya"	Traditional, Dropkick Murphys	3:54
15.	"Never Forget"		2:51
Total length:			46:27

Limited Edition
No.	Title	Writer(s)	Length
16.	"Jailbreak"	Phil Lynott	3:54
17.	"The Thick Skin of Defiance"		2:47
18.	"Forever 2007"		3:47
19.	"Breakdown"		2:28
20.	"(F)lannigan's Ball" (Original Version)	Traditional, Dropkick Murphys	3:39
Total length:			63:17

European Edition
No.	Title	Writer(s)	Length
16.	"Jailbreak"	Phil Lynott	3:54
Total length:			50:36

iTunes Deluxe Edition
No.	Title	Length
16.	"Forever" (Acoustic Version)	3:45
17.	"The Thick Skin of Defiance"	2:46
18.	"Breakdown"	2:27
Total length:		55:40

Australian Edition
No.	Title	Writer(s)	Length
16.	"Jailbreak"	Phil Lynott	3:54
17.	"Promise Land"		1:59
Total length:			52:35

Deluxe Vinyl Edition
No.	Title	Writer(s)	Length
16.	"Baba O'Riley"	Pete Townshend	4:20
17.	"Promise Land"		1:59
Total length:			53:01

== DVD Listing ==
1. The State of Massachusetts (Music Video)
2. Making The State of Massachusetts
3. (F)lannigans Ball (Music Video)
4. The Wild Rover (Charity Breakfast)
5. Forever (Charity Breakfast)
6. Boys on the Dock (Charity Breakfast)
7. Johnny, I Hardly knew Ya (Music Video)
8. Credits

== Personnel ==
=== Dropkick Murphys ===
- Al Barr – vocals
- Tim Brennan – mandolin, tin whistle, acoustic guitar
- Ken Casey – bass, vocals
- Matt Kelly – drums, bodhrán, vocals
- James Lynch – guitar, vocals
- Marc Orrell – guitar, accordion, vocals
- Josh "Scruffy" Wallace – bagpipes

=== Additional personnel ===
- Spider Stacy – vocals on "(F)lannigan's Ball"
- Ronnie Drew – vocals on "(F)lannigan's Ball"
- Rick Barton – additional guitar on "The State of Massachusetts"
- John Kingsley – Violin
- Kenny Tallent – Bagpipes
- Halley Feaster – Cello, String Arrangements
- Jeni Magaña – Double bass

== Charts ==
Chart performance
Chart (2007)	Peak position
Australian Albums (ARIA)	85
Belgian Albums (Ultratop Flanders)	92
Canadian Albums (Nielsen SoundScan)	88
Dutch Albums (Album Top 100)	76
Dutch Alternative Albums (Alternative Top 30)	28
German Albums (Offizielle Top 100)	38
Irish Albums (IRMA)	98
Swedish Albums (Sverigetopplistan)	18
Swedish Hard Rock Albums (Sverigetopplistan)	2
UK Albums (Official Charts)	165
UK Independent Albums (Official Charts)	10
US Billboard 200	20
US Independent Albums (Billboard)	2
US Indie Store Album Sales (Billboard)	3
US Top Alternative Albums (Billboard)	7
US Top Hard Rock Albums (Billboard)	3
US Top Rock Albums (Billboard)	7
