= The Light Divides =

Studio album by Winterpills
- Released: February 27, 2007
- Recorded: 2007
- Studios: Sackamusic, Conway, Massachusetts
- Genre: Indie rock
- Label: Signature Sounds
- Producers: Dave Chalfant, Winterpills

Winterpills chronology
Winterpills (2005)	The Light Divides (2007)	Central Chambers (2008)

Professional ratings
Review scores
Source	Rating
Music Box	3/5 stars
PopMatters	7/10

The Light Divides is the second studio album by the indie rock band Winterpills, released on February 27, 2007.

== Track listing ==
No.	Title	Length
1.	"Lay Your Heartbreak"	3:06
2.	"Hide Me"	4:04
3.	"Handkerchiefs"	3:38
4.	"Broken Arm"	2:44
5.	"Shameful"	2:31
6.	"Eclipse"	3:37
7.	"July"	5:02
8.	"A Ransom"	3:05
9.	"I Bear Witness"	5:20
10.	"June Eyes"	4:02
11.	"Angels Fall"	2:28
12.	"You Don't Live Long Enough"	3:21
13.	"A Folded Cloth"	3:32
14.	"Untitled"	4:58
15.	"Broken Arm (Reprise)" (Hidden track)	2:46
Total length:		54:14

The 14th track is an untitled track of nearly 5 minutes of silence, which precedes the final hidden track.

== Personnel ==
Winterpills

- Philip Price – vocals, acoustic guitar, keyboards
- Flora Reed – vocals, keyboards, tambourine
- Brian Akey – bass
- Dave Hower – drums, xylophone, shaker
- Dennis Crommett – electric guitar, backing vocals

Technical personnel

- Jose Ayerve – engineer, bass, snare
- Franck Juery – photography
- Ana Price-Eckles – photography
- Produced by Dave Chalfant, Winterpills
- Mastered by Roger Seibel
- Recorded and mixed by Dave Chalfant at Sackamusic, Conway, MA
