= Winterpills (album) =

Studio album by Winterpills
- Released: (United States) 8 November 2005 (Germany) 28 April 2006
- Recorded: February 2005 at Boomerang Ranch, Hadley, Massachusetts; 2005 at Sackamusic, Conway, Massachusetts
- Genre: Indie rock
- Length: 38:46
- Label: Signature Sounds
- Producer: José Ayerve, Dave Chalfant

Winterpills chronology
Winterpills (2005)	The Light Divides (2007)

Professional ratings
Review scores
Source	Rating
AllMusic	3.5/5 stars
Music Box	4/5 stars
Stylus	C+

Winterpills is the eponymous debut studio album by the Northampton, Massachusetts indie rock band Winterpills, released on November 8, 2005. The album brought the band some critical and fan acclaim, landing in the Top 100 for both iTunes and Amazon.com and a feature on NPR's Weekend Edition.

== Track listing ==
No.	Title	Length
1.	"A Benediction"	3:34
2.	"Laughing"	4:09
3.	"Cranky"	2:55
4.	"Threshing Machine"	3:36
5.	"Want The Want"	5:04
6.	"Pills For Sara"	4:01
7.	"Found Weekend"	3:14
8.	"Portrait"	5:36
9.	"Letter To A Friend In Jail"	3:48
10.	"Looking Down"	2:49

== Personnel ==
Winterpills

- Philip Price – vocals, acoustic guitar, keyboards
- Flora Reed – vocals
- José Ayerve – bass
- Dave Hower – drums, percussion
- Dennis Crommett – electric guitar, backing vocals

Technical personnel

- Henning Ohlenbusch – photography
- Ana Price-Eckles – photography
- Mastered by Rick Fisher
- Mixed by José Ayerve and David Chalfant
- Produced by José Ayerve and recorded at Boomerang Ranch, Hadley, Massachusetts, except for "Looking Down", which was produced by David Chalfant and recorded at Sackamusic, Conway, Massachusetts
