= José Ayerve =

- Born: April 28, 1974 (age 52); Bogotá, Colombia
- Genres: Indie rock
- Instruments: Guitar, vocals
- Label: Pigeon Records

José Ayerve (born April 28, 1974) is a recording artist/singer and songwriter and the front man for northeast-based indie rock groups Spouse and Nuclear Waste Management Club. He has released a number of singles and albums on vinyl and CD and is a frequent collaborator with a number of musicians and bands.

In addition, Ayerve is a recording engineer and producer for not only his own projects, but also for artists that include Winterpills, Lo Fine, Sometymes Why, Pernice Brothers, Katie Sawicki Dennis Crommett, New Radiant Storm King, Michael Merenda, and Kristen Gass.

He has also helped co-write the single "Pega Luna Manny" along with Joe Pernice of the Pernice Brothers, a song about former Boston Red Sox player Manny Ramírez. which enjoyed moderate success when the Boston Red Sox won the world series that year, for the first time in 86 years. It was included in the credit roll at the end of the 2005 film, Fever Pitch.

== Biography ==
José Ayerve was born in Bogotá, Colombia on April 28, 1974, though his family soon relocated first to Springfield, Massachusetts, then Quito, Ecuador before again returning to Springfield.

Ayerve began studying music at the age of nine. He transitioned from piano to guitar at 13, and became a multi-instrumentalist by the time he reached college in 1992. After 1992 he relocated to Portland, Maine and would eventually join the Portland-based group Bullyclub in 1999. His main pursuit since 1995 has been the schizophrenic, indie-pop group, Spouse.

== Discography ==
=== Albums ===
- Cinco Pesos (as José Ignacio Ayerve, released: 01/02, Pigeon Records)
- Nozomi (with Spouse) released: 09/00, Pigeon Records)
- Love Can't Save This Love (with Spouse released: 02/02, Pigeon Records)
- Catch 22 (with Spouse released: 01/04, Pigeon Records)
- Are You Gonna Kiss or Wave Goodbye? (with Spouse, released: 09/2004, Pigeon Records)
- Relocation Tactics (with Spouse, released 3/07, Pigeon Records)
- The Nuclear Waste Management Club (as José Ayerve, released: 11/08, Pigeon Records)

=== Singles ===
- Marvel to DC (7" vinyl single, released: 04/99, Pigeon Records)
  - Wonder Woman
  - X-Man (I Want To Be an...)
  - Superman)
- Focus 7" vinyl single, released: 04/99, Pigeon Records)
  - Focus
  - Harry Crooker, FLA
  - Marbles

=== With other artists ===
==== Sometymes Why ====
- Your Heart is a Glorious Machine (released: 03/10/2009, Signature Sounds)
  - produced by José Ayerve, engineered by Max Feldman

==== Haunt ====
- The Deep North (10/2008, Nine Mile Records)
  - J.Ayerve: producer, bass, electric guitars, sk-5, backing vocals

==== Katie Sawicki ====
- Time Spent Lost (05/2008, self-release)
  - J.Ayerve: producer, bass, backing vocals, sk-5

==== Bullyclub ====
- Like Songs (released: 06/2001, Pigeon Records)
- Tender Hooks (released: 02/2003, Pigeon Records)

==== Chappaquiddick Skyline ====
- Chappaquiddick Skyline, released: 2000
  - J.Ayerve: b.vocals on "Knights of the Night, Vol III"

==== Lo Fine ====
- Slow To a Crawl (released: 11/2002, Pigeon Records)
  - recorded & produced by José Ayerve, Kevin O'Rourke, & Bruce Tull
  - J. Ayerve: bass, sk-5, charango
- Not For Us Two (released 4/2008, Pigeon Records)
  - recorded & produced by Kevin O'Rourke and Mark Alan Miller.
  - J. Ayerve: b.vocals on "Damage Twins", "Over My Shoulder", "My Favorite Illusion (Not For Us Two)".

==== New Radiant Storm King ====
- Winters Kill (released: 04/2002, Rainbow Quartz)
  - recorded by Thom Monahan, Mark Alan Miller, and José Ayerve
  - J. Ayerve: b.vocals on "Golden Parachute", tape manipulations on "Constellation Prize"

==== Winterpills ====
- Winterpills (released: 11/08/2005, Signature Sounds/Soft Alarm)
  - recorded, produced, and mixed by José Ayerve, additional mixing by Dave Chalfant
- The Light Divides (released: 02/27/2007, Signature Sounds/Soft Alarm)
  - J.Ayerve: co-production, bass, backing vocals
