= Samuel Richards (swimmer) =

American swimmer

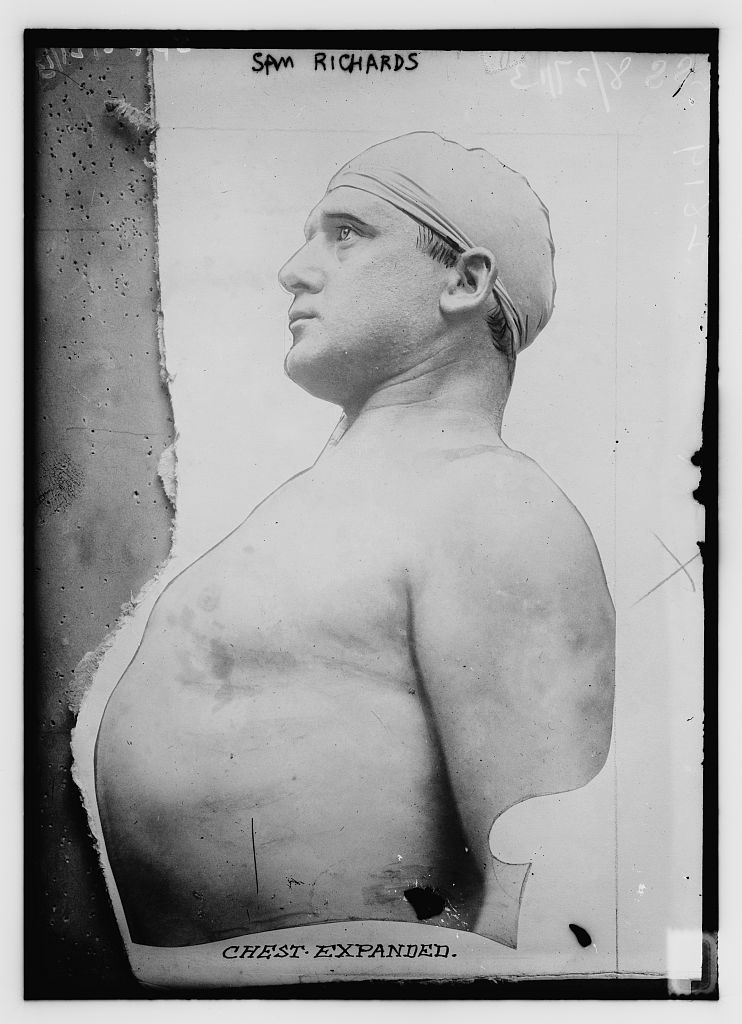

Personal information
- Born: Boston, Massachusetts, United States

Sport
- Sport: Swimming
- Strokes: Long-distance swimming

Samuel Richards of Boston, Massachusetts was a long distance swimmer. He won the Boston Light Swim in 1911 and in 1912. In 1913, he swam from the Charlestown Bridge to the Boston Light and back, a distance of about 24 miles.

Richards was a member of the L Street Brownies, a polar bear club based in South Boston.
