= Couch discography =

Discography of American band Couch

- Studio albums: 1
- EPs: 5
- Singles: 15

The discography of the American band Couch consists of one studio album, five EPs, and 15 singles.

The seven-piece soul-, funk-, and jazz-pop band from Greater Boston, Massachusetts formed in 2018 and have been releasing their music independently ever since. Their debut album Big Talk was released on October 24, 2025.

== Studio albums ==
Title	Details
Big Talk	Released: October 24, 2025; Label: Self-released

== Extended plays ==
Title	Release Date
Couch	February 26, 2021
Sunshower	November 3, 2023
The Sweater Sessions	February 2, 2024
Sunshower - Live in LA	May 3, 2024
The Sweater Sessions II	April 11, 2025

== Singles ==
Title	Year	Album/EP
"I'm Leavin' (The Na-Na song)" (featuring Ella Galvin)	2019	Non-album single
"Conjunction Junction"	2019	Non-album single
"Easy to Love"	2019	Non-album single
"Fall Into Place"	2020	Couch
"Black Bear Lane"	2021	Couch
"Poems"	2022	Non-album single
"Autumn"	2022	Non-album single
"Saturday"	2022	Non-album single
"Alright"	2023	Sunshower
"(I Wanted) Summer With You"	2023	Sunshower
"Sorry (Live in LA)"	2024	Sunshower - Live in LA
"Toxic (The Sweater Sessions II)"	2025	The Sweater Sessions II
"What Were You Thinking"	2025	Big Talk
"On the Wire"	2025	Big Talk
"Slow Burn"	2025	Big Talk
