= Rose Pitonof =

American swimmer

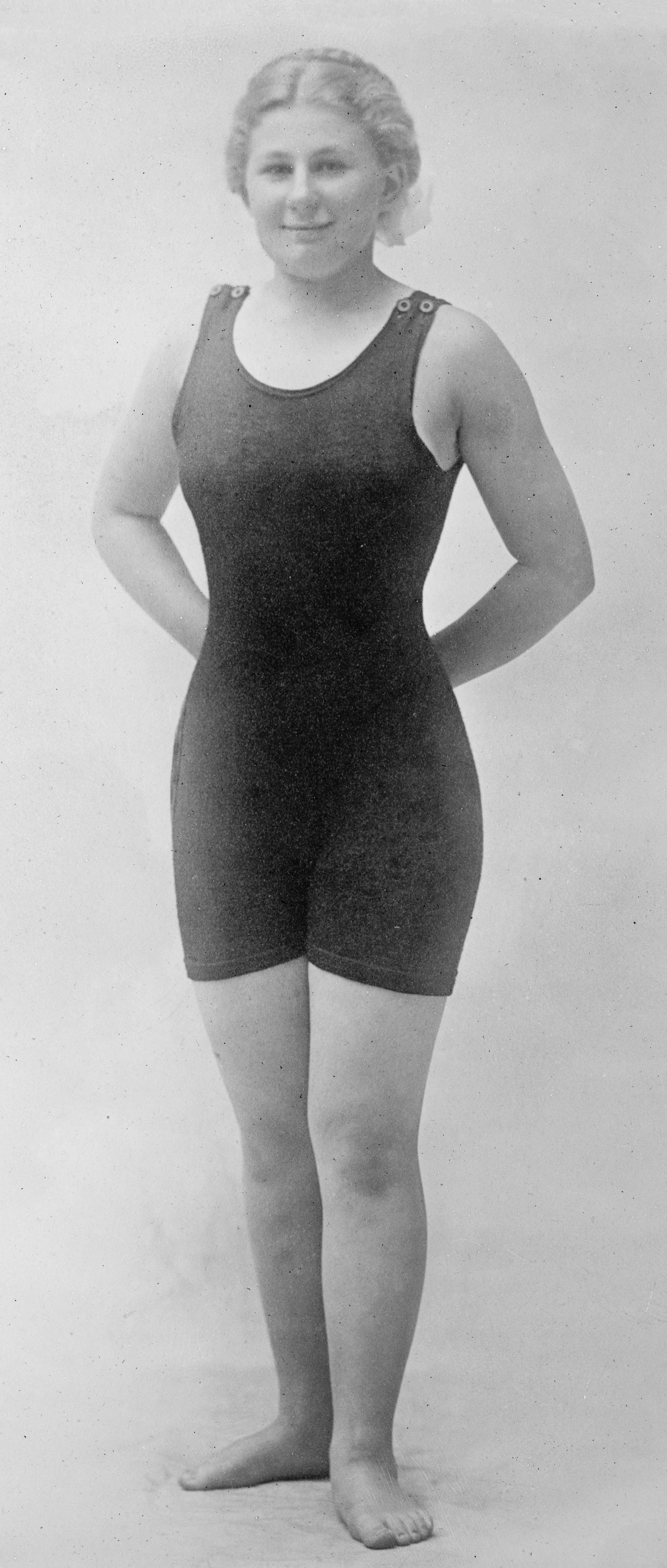

Personal information
- Born: April 19, 1895 Dorchester, Massachusetts
- Died: June 15, 1984 (aged 89)

Sport
- Sport: Swimming

Rose Pitonof Weene (April 19, 1895 – June 15, 1984) was a marathon swimmer from Dorchester, Massachusetts.

== Biography ==
Pitonof was born on April 19, 1895, to Eli Pitonof and Fanny Wolf in Dorchester, Boston. Her parents owned a grocery store together, and Eli served as Rose's manager until his death due to the outbreak of the 1918 flu pandemic after the First World War.

Pitonof was raised with four other siblings, three brothers Adolf, Benny, and Louis, and a sister Ida. Adolf was in the boat with her coach during her successful East 26th Street to Steeplechase Pier swim.

On September 18, 1910, at the age of 15, Pitonof was first woman to have successfully swum a 17-mile stretch around the waters surrounding New York City and was the first person to have completed the course from East Twenty-fourth St., to Coney Island, finishing in four and a half hours without any outside assistance.

Earlier that year, on August 7, 1910, Pitonof won the Boston Light Swim, an eight-mile open water event, in a record time of 6 hours and 50 minutes. Seven men started the competition with her, but none apart from her successfully finished. She was the first woman to ever complete the event. Her record stood for several years, and her unprecedented success in the Boston Light Swim was noted in a 1912 Chicago Tribune article titled, "Is There Anything Women Can't Do?"

After her Boston Light Swim, Pitonof became a Vaudeville performer.

"My act was part of a larger Vaudeville program, but I was the headliner. I know for a good, good many years I held a record for attendance. They built a tank of water on the stage, and I would exhibit some of my strokes and dives," she said.

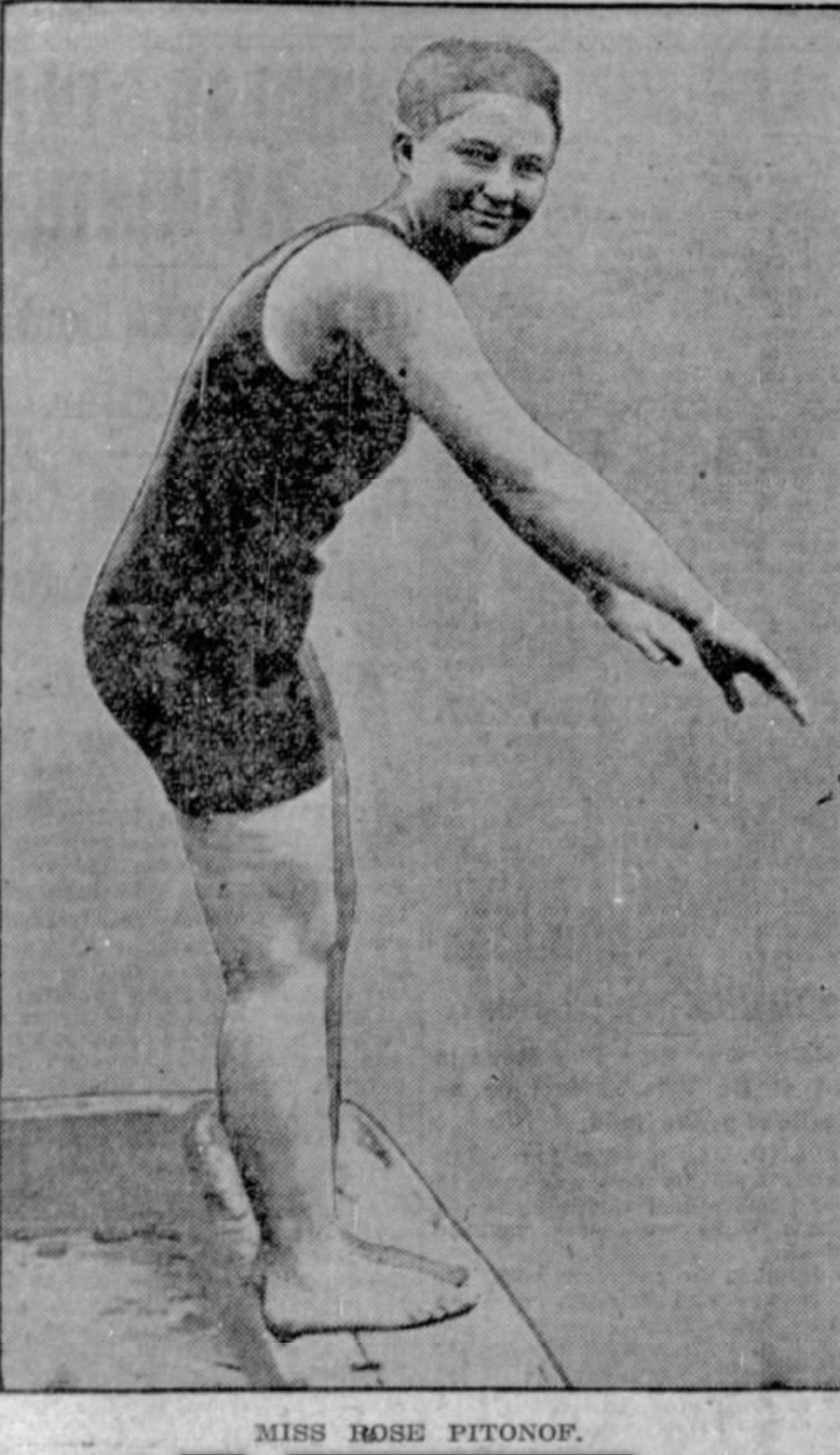

Pitonof's performances were not strictly entertainment based. Her demonstrations also included important life saving skills: "In conjunction to Rose Pitonof's swimming and diving exhibitions, she will demonstrate how to save a person from drowning. Miss Pitonof has, during her young life, saved several from a watery end, and in her performances this afternoon, you will witness an exhibition that will interest and instruct. A crowded house will no doubt greet this little Boston school girl, who has won the title of World's Champion Long Distance Swimmer."

During the early 1900s, many people did not know how to swim, and in many cases learning how to swim was actively discouraged among women.

The General Slocum tragedy of June 15, 1904, in which 1021 passengers died trying to save themselves from a burning boat that was banked in seven feet of water less than 20 feet from shore, was a heartbreaking illustration of this situation. This was the single greatest instance of loss of life in the New York City area until the World Trade Center terrorist attacks on September 11, 2001.

On September 18, 1910, Pitonof swam from East 23rd Street to a half mile away from Steeplechase Pier, winning a race against Mrs. Clara Bouton. On their way to Coney Island, they swam past the East 5th Street pier that the ill-fated General Slocum launched from.

On August 13, 1911, Pitonof swam from East 26th Street to Steeplechase Pier, earning the woman's title of Long Distance Swimming Champion of the World. The distance between the two points is 17 miles. It is estimated that Pitonof covered 21 miles during eight hours and seven minutes in the water. She swam mostly breast stroke, occasionally passing underneath piers. Her nutrition for the day was a chicken sandwich and a cup of coffee before she started her swim. It is estimated that a crowd of 50,000 were cheering for her at Coney Island. The annual Rose Pitonof Swim along the same route commemorates her achievement.

A year later Pitonof headed to England to attempt to swim across English Channel. In August 1912 she was forced to delay her Channel Swim until September due to storms. While she waited for better weather, she swam the Thames River. In September 1912 she was again prevented from attempting the Channel due to heavy winds.

In 1913 Pitonof made a couple of attempts at swimming from the Manhattan Battery to Sandy Hook, New Jersey. On July 20, 1913, the tide was against her, and she was forced to abandon the attempt after two miles. On September 14, 1913, just a quarter of a mile away from her goal, Pitonof was taken into the boat due to an attack of cramps. She had been in the water 12 hours and 35 minutes.

During the First World War, attempts at swimming the English Channel were curtailed. It was not until August 6, 1926, that Gertrude Ederle became the first woman to successfully cross the English Channel.

On June 28, 1916, Pitonof married Doctor Fredric Weene, a Boston dentist. It is rumored that she gave up an opportunity to go to Hollywood in order to marry.

The Weene family was a colorful, social couple who spent time with many of the celebrities of the era that they knew from Pitonof's Vaudeville days. They had a house in Onset on Cape Cod, and Pitonof taught swimming in the area, where they had two daughters named Evelyn and Elinor. Of the two daughters, Elinor Weene became a champion swimmer.

There were three grandchildren: Maxine, Sandy, and Carol. Pitonof's granddaughters Sandy and Carol were swimming at 18 months.

Pitonof and her husband moved to Desert Hot Spring, Arizona, in 1948, moving back to the Boston area in later years.

Pitonof died on June 15, 1984, at the age of 89. She is survived by both daughters, all three grandchildren, and four great-grandchildren.
