= Couch (American band) =

American fusion pop band

- Origin: Boston, Massachusetts, US
- Genres: soul pop; funk-pop; jazz-pop; retro-pop; indie-pop
- Works: Discography
- Years active: 2018–present
- Label: Couch Productions
- Members: Tema Siegel; Zach Blankstein; Jared Gozinsky; Will Griffin; Danny Silverston; Jeffrey Pinsker-Smith; Eric Tarlin
- Website: couchtheband.com

Couch is a seven-piece soul-, funk-, and jazz-pop band from Greater Boston, Massachusetts, formed in 2018. Their sound is described as a blend of pop, R&B, jazz, and rock. On October 24, 2025, they released their debut album, Big Talk, and received five nominations for the Boston Music Awards at the end of the year.

== History ==
All members of Couch except the drummer, Jared Gozinsky, are from Greater Boston, Massachusetts. They knew each other from school and other community activities and formed the band in Boston in the fall of 2018. They worked together virtually for three years while studying in different locations, with each member typically contributing to the songwriting and producing process. Their debut EP Couch was released in February 2021, followed by Sunshower (2023) and The Sweater Sessions (2024).

Couch, managed by their guitarist, Zach Blankstein, has performed at major festivals like Boston Calling and Levitate Music & Arts Festival. They received the Salt Lick Incubator Award, with an advisory board including Charlie Puth, Jon Batiste, and Susan Tedeschi. In April 2025, they headlined The Town and the City Festival in Lowell, MA. The band's self-produced debut studio album Big Talk was released on October 24, 2025. It was mastered by Colin Leonard.

In 2025, Couch received five nominations for the Boston Music Awards, including in the category "Artist of the Year".

== Artistry ==
=== Musical style ===
The sound of Couch is described as a blend of pop, R&B, jazz, and rock, reflecting their members' experiences in jazz, a cappella, and musical theater. Singer Tema Siegel described Couch as a pop band whose members grew up playing jazz and listening to funk and soul. In interviews, the band has expressed an interest in balancing instrumental virtuosity with accessible pop songwriting, giving their music both complexity and wide appeal.

=== Influences ===
In an interview with CBS News, saxophonist Eric Tarlin cites Earth, Wind and Fire and Tower of Power as examples of funk bands from the 1970s that had a strong influence on him. Siegel said in a recent interview that they love artists like Bruno Mars and Lake Street Dive and try to convey the same energy live. When writing new music, she draws inspiration from singer-songwriters Maggie Rogers and Madison Cunningham. According to The Waster, influences from Lake Street Dive, Cory Wong, and Lawrence can be heard throughout the album Big Talk.

== Founding Members ==
- Tema Siegel (lead vocals)
- Zach Blankstein (guitar)
- Jared Gozinsky (drums)
- Will Griffin (bass)
- Danny Silverston (keyboards)
- Jeffrey Pinsker-Smith (trumpet)
- Eric Tarlin (saxophone)

== Discography ==
=== Studio albums ===
- Big Talk (2025)

=== EPs ===
- Couch (2021)
- Sunshower (2023)
- The Sweater Sessions (2024)
- Sunshower - Live in LA (2024)
- The Sweater Sessions II (2025)

== Tours ==
- Sunshower Tour, with special guest Alisa Amador (October 2023 – July 2024)
- Big Talk Tour (November 6, 2025 – March 22, 2026)

== See also ==
- List of songs about Boston
