= Alexander N. Rossolimo =

American executive and entrepreneur

Alexander N. Rossolimo is an American think tank executive, entrepreneur, and corporate director.

== Early life and education ==
Rossolimo was born in Paris, France. His parents were Nicolas Rossolimo, an International Grandmaster of chess, and Véra (née Boudakovitch). His maternal grandfather, Anatole Pavlovich Boudakovitch, was a Russian-Polish count and colonel in the Imperial Russian Army, who died in battle near Warsaw during World War I. He was awarded the Cross of St. George posthumously in 1917 for his bravery. His great-grandfather, General Nikolay Bornovolokov, also perished during World War I. At age twelve, Rossolimo emigrated with his parents to the United States, settling in New York City, where he attended Stuyvesant High School and the Lycée Français de New York.

Rossolimo graduated with a Bachelor of Electrical Engineering degree from the City College of New York, where he was awarded the Belden gold medal in mathematics and the Blonder Tongue Award in electronics, and was elected to the national engineering honor societies Tau Beta Pi and Eta Kappa Nu. He attended graduate school at Harvard University, where he had a National Science Foundation Graduate Fellowship, and received an M.A. in applied mathematics and in 1973 a Ph.D. in applied physics under the supervision of Professor David Turnbull. That same year, he received a Master's degree in management (M.B.A.) from the MIT Sloan School of Management. During 1991–93, he was a Visiting Fellow in Slavic Languages and Literatures at Harvard University.

== Career ==
Rossolimo started his business career as a financial analyst at Pechiney SA in Paris. He then worked in brand management at the Clorox Company in Oakland. Then he joined Boston Consulting Group (BCG) as a management consultant and project leader. Rossolimo is listed among 62 notable and famous BCG alumni out of a total of over 30,000 alumni worldwide. He then worked as director of planning and financial analysis at United Brands Company in Boston, New York, and Chicago. In 1980, he joined Digital Equipment Corporation in Maynard, MA, where he conducted projects in the Office of the President – who was then the legendary computer pioneer Ken Olsen – in the areas of management research, business strategy, corporate venturing, and security. In 1999, he co-founded Intellect Exchange Inc., a high-tech startup in knowledge management, where he served as acting Chief Executive Officer. In 2006, he became regional director of a strategic consulting firm conducting due diligence for private equity and venture capital firms.

Fluent in several languages, Rossolimo has spoken at conferences in the US and abroad, and at international meetings in London, Paris, Moscow, and Casablanca He is a former president and chairman of the Boston Chapter of the Association for Corporate Growth (ACG), the national organization of professionals in corporate growth and M&A. In 1995, he won first prize in the ACG Dealmaker Challenge. He has served on the board of directors of ACG Global, and on the board of advisors of Radia Technologies Corporation. He is a member of the Boston Security Analysts Society (BSAS), the System Dynamics Society, and the National Association of Corporate Directors (NACD), New England Chapter. He is a member of the Harvard Club of Boston, and in 2015 was elected President of the Harvard Club of Cape Cod. During 2014–17, he was appointed Harvard Alumni Association director for Southeastern New England. A physical fitness enthusiast, he is a member of the L Street Brownies Swim Club. He is also a member of the Royal United Services Institute for Defence and Security Studies (RUSI).

Rossolimo is the chairman of the Center for Security and Social Progress Inc (CSSP). a think tank focused on policy, global security, sustainable economic growth and overall social progress, which he co-founded with the writer Robin Moore, author of the best sellers "The Green Berets" and "The French Connection". Rossolimo's articles have appeared in a number of leading publications. Rossolimo has rendered "important technical assistance" for Robin Moore's book, The Moscow Connection." CSSP's Advisory Board has included former US Secretary of State Alexander Haig, former Deputy Secretary of State and chairman of Goldman Sachs John C. Whitehead, the best-seller writer Robin Moore, the technology leader David Packard, co-founder of the Hewlett-Packard Company, the actor and diplomat Douglas Fairbanks Jr., and the businessman and philanthropist Albert Hamilton Gordon. Paul A. Samuelson, Nobel Memorial Prize in Economic Sciences Laureate, wrote to Rossolimo about his CSSP work: "Your CSSP effort has certainly been prescient!"
