= Tessie (given name) =

Tessie is a feminine given name or nickname, often of Teresa or Theresa, which may refer to:

- Tessie Agana (born 1942), Filipina former child actress
- Tessie Aquino-Oreta (1944–2020), Filipino politician
- Tessie Camilleri (1901–1930), first female graduate at the University of Malta
- Tessie Eria Lambourne (born 1971), Kiribati civil servant, diplomat and politician
- Tessie Mobley (1906–1990), American operatic soprano
- Tessie Oelrichs (1871–1926), American socialite
- Tessie O'Shea (1913–1995), Welsh entertainer and actress
- Tessie Reynolds (1876–1954), British cyclist
- Tessie Santiago (born 1975), American actress
- Tessie Savelkouls (born 1992), Dutch retired judoka
- Tessie Soi (born c. 1960), Papua New Guinean social worker
- Tessie Thompson, fictional character in the British soap opera Hollyoaks
- Tessie Tomas (born 1945), Filipina actress, comedian, and a former advertising executive
- Tessie Wall (1869–1932), American madam and brothel owner

== See also ==
- Tess (given name)
- Tessie (disambiguation)
- Lucille Ball (1911–1989), American actress, comedian, model, film studio executive and producer nicknamed "Technicolor Tessie"
