= Michael T. McGreevy =

American businessman and baseball fanatic

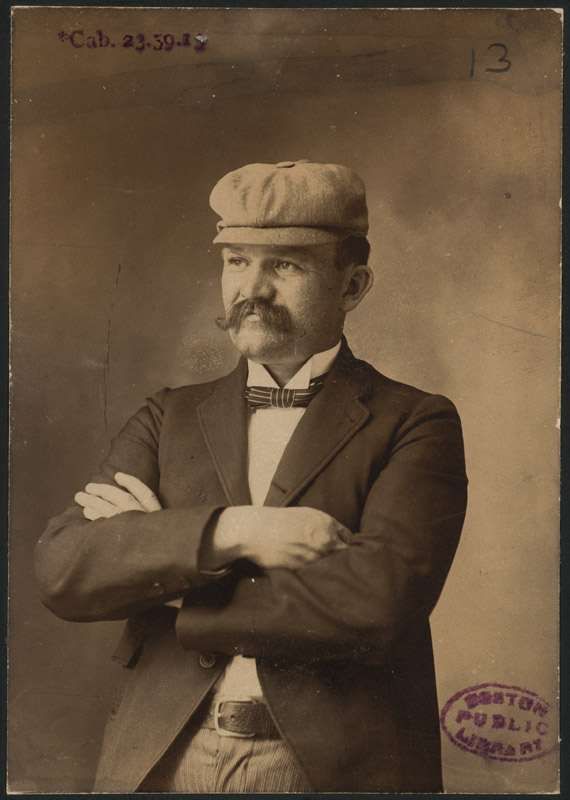
- McGreevy in 1903
- Born: June 16, 1865; Roxbury, Massachusetts, U.S.
- Died: February 2, 1943 (aged 77); Roxbury, Massachusetts, U.S.
- Resting place: Mount Calvary Cemetery in Roslindale, Massachusetts
- Other name: Nuf Ced
- Known for: Leader of the Royal Rooters; Owner of the Third Base Saloon

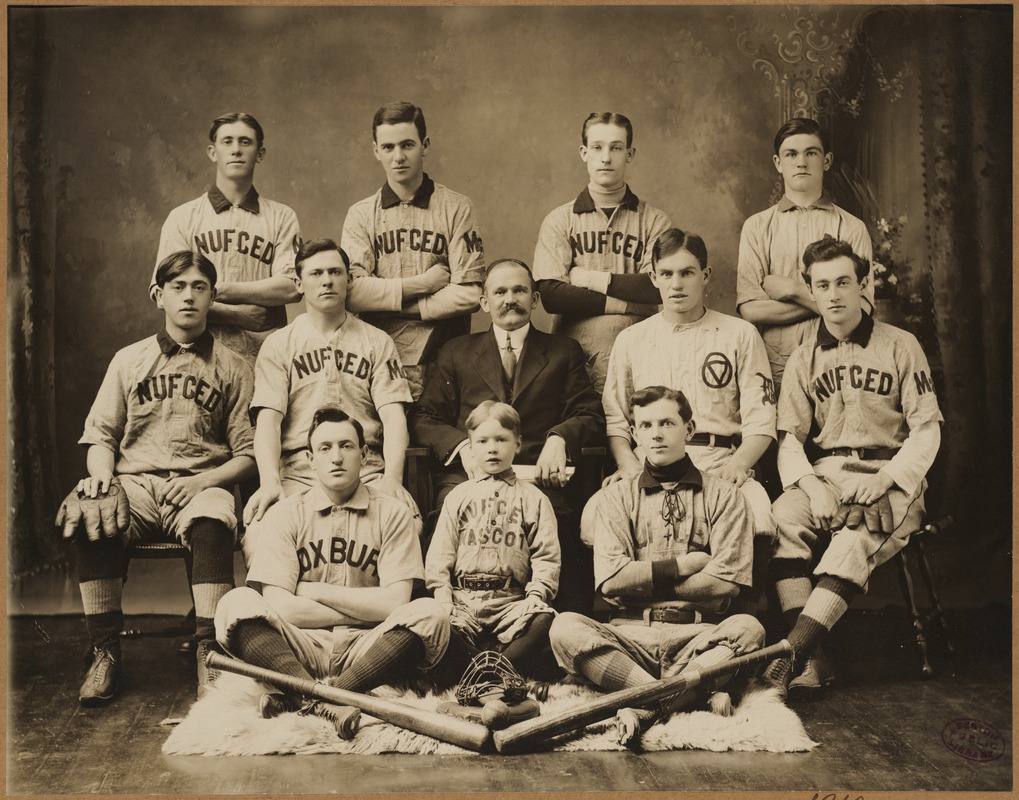
McGreevy with his Nuf Ced team, 1910. Michael T. "Nuf Ced" McGreevy Collection, Boston Public Library

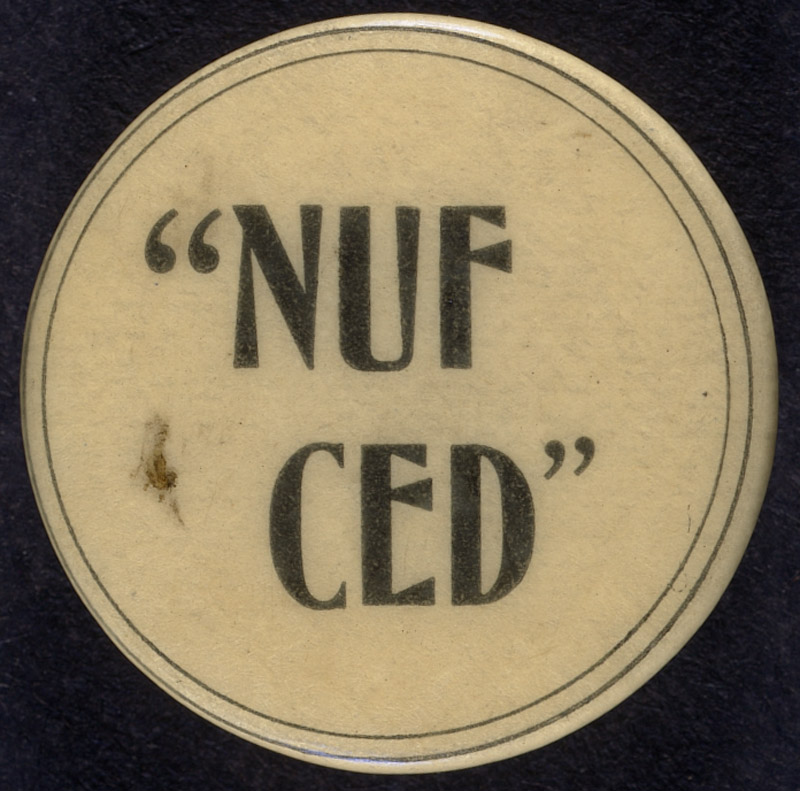
This pin featuring McGreevy's nickname, "Nuf Ced", was produced by McGreevy around the time of the 1903 World Series; it was added to the Boston Public Library's collection in 1923.

Michael T. "Nuf Ced" McGreevy (June 16, 1865 – February 2, 1943) was an American businessman and baseball fanatic. He was the leader of the most vocal fans of the Boston Americans (now the Boston Red Sox), known as the "Royal Rooters", and owner of a Boston bar called the Third Base Saloon.

== Biography ==
McGreevy's bar got its name because, like third base, it was the last stop before home. His saloon was Boston's original sports bar—it was decorated in a baseball theme, with pictures of the players, and a scoreboard on the outside wall. His nickname, "Nuf Ced", was given to him because that was what he usually shouted to end barroom disputes, usually about the Boston Americans and the Boston Braves. He was an avid member of the L Street Brownies, one of the oldest polar bear swim clubs in the country.

McGreevy amassed a rich collection of photographs, clippings, and other baseball memorabilia. When Prohibition forced McGreevy to close Third Base, he donated his collection to the Boston Public Library. Author Glenn Stout (A Red Sox Century) helped popularize the collection when he worked at the library.

The theme song of the Royal Rooters was "Tessie" from the Broadway musical "The Silver Slipper". McGreevy was mentioned in a 2004 remake of the song by the Irish American punk band Dropkick Murphys—Tessie, Nuff Ced McGreevy shouted, We're not here to mess around. The song was subsequently part of the soundtrack of the 2005 movie Fever Pitch concerning fans of the 2004 Boston Red Sox season.

In 2008, Dropkick Murphys bassist Ken Casey opened an eponymous bar in McGreevy's honor, and added open-air elements for warmer months. There was also a sign on the front of the bar that said "1200 Steps to Fenway Park." This iteration of McGreevy's permanently closed following Massachusetts' March 10, 2020 state of emergency declaration, due to the building's owner, A&S Realty, demanding full rent payments despite the ongoing coronavirus pandemic. It was on Boylston Street across from the Hynes Convention Center located in the Back Bay of Boston.
