= Lanigan's Ball =

Irish folk song

"Lanigan's Ball" (sometimes "Lannigan's Ball") is a popular Irish folk song which has been played throughout the world since at least the 1860s and possibly much longer. Typically performed in a minor key, it generally is played in an upbeat style reminiscent of the party atmosphere in which the story that the lyrics portray unfolds.

In Alfred Perceval Graves' book, Songs of Irish Wit and Humour, published in 1884, "Lanigan's Ball" is attributed to anon. In Folk Songs of the Catskills, edited by Norman Cazden, Herbert Haufrecht and Norman Studer, there is a reference to John Diprose's songster of 1865 attributing "Lanigan's Ball" to D. K. Gavan with music by John Candy. It also mentions that the tune was previously known as "Hurry the Jug". In 1863 William Pond & Company published the song in an arrangement by Charles William Glover, attributing the words to Tony Pastor and the music to Neil Bryant of Bryant's Minstrels.

== Origin and subject ==
"Lanigan's Ball", a tune about a party thrown by the titular Jeremy Lanigan in Athy, County Kildare, is speculated to be inspired by a real party. It falls into the tradition of what is essentially a musical inside joke, and was likely written by a party goer in thanks to the host. The song describes a raucous party thrown by Lanigan after inheriting land from his father, and for the friends and family who helped him while he was living in self-afflicted poverty.

In the town of Athy one Jeremy Lanigan,

Battered away till he hadn't a pound; His father died and made him a man again, Left him a farm and an acre of ground. He gave a grand ball to his friends and relations,

who did not forget him when he went to the wall.

The party moves from a lively party;

They were startin' all sorts of onsensical dances, Turnin' around in a nate [sic] whirligig

Into a chaotic brawl, before the party finally ends.

Oh, boys, there was the ructions-

Myself got a lick from big Phelim Mc Hugh, But I soon replied to his kind introductions, And kicked up a terrible hullabaloo. Old Shamus [sic] the piper had like to be strangled, They squeezed up his pipe, bellows, chanters and all; The girls in their ribbons they got all entangled,

And that was the end to Lanigan's ball.

== Recordings and cover versions ==
This song has been covered by many artists. The Bards had a hit with it in Ireland in 1980. Christy Moore recorded it on his LP The Time Has Come in 1983, re-released on CD in 2007.

A version of this song was recorded by the American celtic punk band Dropkick Murphys on their sixth studio album, The Meanest of Times. The title was changed to "(F)lannigan's Ball", and the lyrics have been significantly altered, although the subject matter of the song remains the same. Jump, Little Children performs another popular version of this song with most of the lyrics retained. The Celtic fusion band Enter the Haggis also recorded this song on their album Aerials with its traditional lyrics. New York rock band the Jim C Experience did a version of the song entitled "Glennigan's Ball". The German band Fiddler's Green recorded it in 1995 for the Album "King Shepherd". LeperKhanz recorded a version of the song on the album 2005 Tiocfaidh Ár Lá. David Kincaid, on his album The Irish American's Song, the second volume of his Irish-American Civil War songs, does a version called "The President's Ball". Without Question, from Rochester, NY, covered the song on their EP Without Question. Johnny Logan covered the song on his 2013 album, The Irish Connection 2

A parody version by Frank Kelly called "Charlie Stepped In" lampooned the Arms Trial and the political instability of 1970s and early 1980s Ireland.

== Bibliography ==
- Alfred Perceval Graves: Songs of Irish Wit and Humour. Chatto & Windus, 1884.
- Norman Cazden, Herbert Haufrecht, Norman Studer (eds.): Folk Songs of the Catskills. SUNY Press, 1982, p. 601.
