= Tessie (EP) =

EP by Dropkick Murphys
- Released: August 24, 2004
- Genre: Celtic punk
- Length: 17:02
- Label: Hellcat Records
- Producer: Tom Catlin, John Carter

Dropkick Murphys chronology
Blackout (2003)	Tessie (2004)	Singles Collection, Volume 2 (2005)

Professional ratings
Review scores
Source	Rating
Allmusic	2.5/5 stars

Tessie is an EP by Dropkick Murphys released in 2004. It features two covers of the official anthem of the Boston Red Sox, "Tessie". Among the songs included on the CD, only "The Burden (live on WBCN)" and "Tessie (Old Timey Baseball Organ Version)" appear exclusively on this release. "Fields of Athenry" was previously released on Blackout, "Nutty", the song most associated with the Boston Bruins ice hockey team, which is also known as "Nutrocker", was released later on Singles Collection, Volume 2, a rarities compilation album and "Tessie" was a bonus track on their next album, The Warrior's Code, which also included a studio recorded version of "The Burden". The music video for "Tessie" is included on the enhanced portion of this EP.

"Tessie" was the first release to feature guitarist Tim Brennan and bagpipe player Scruffy Wallace who had both joined the band in 2003.

== Track listing ==
No.	Title	Length
1.	"Tessie"	4:13
2.	"The Fields of Athenry"	4:26
3.	"Nutty"	1:21
4.	"The Burden" (Live on WBCN)	2:49
5.	"Tessie" (Old Timey Baseball Organ version)	4:13
Total length:		17:02
