= Tessie Reynolds =

Pioneer English female cyclist

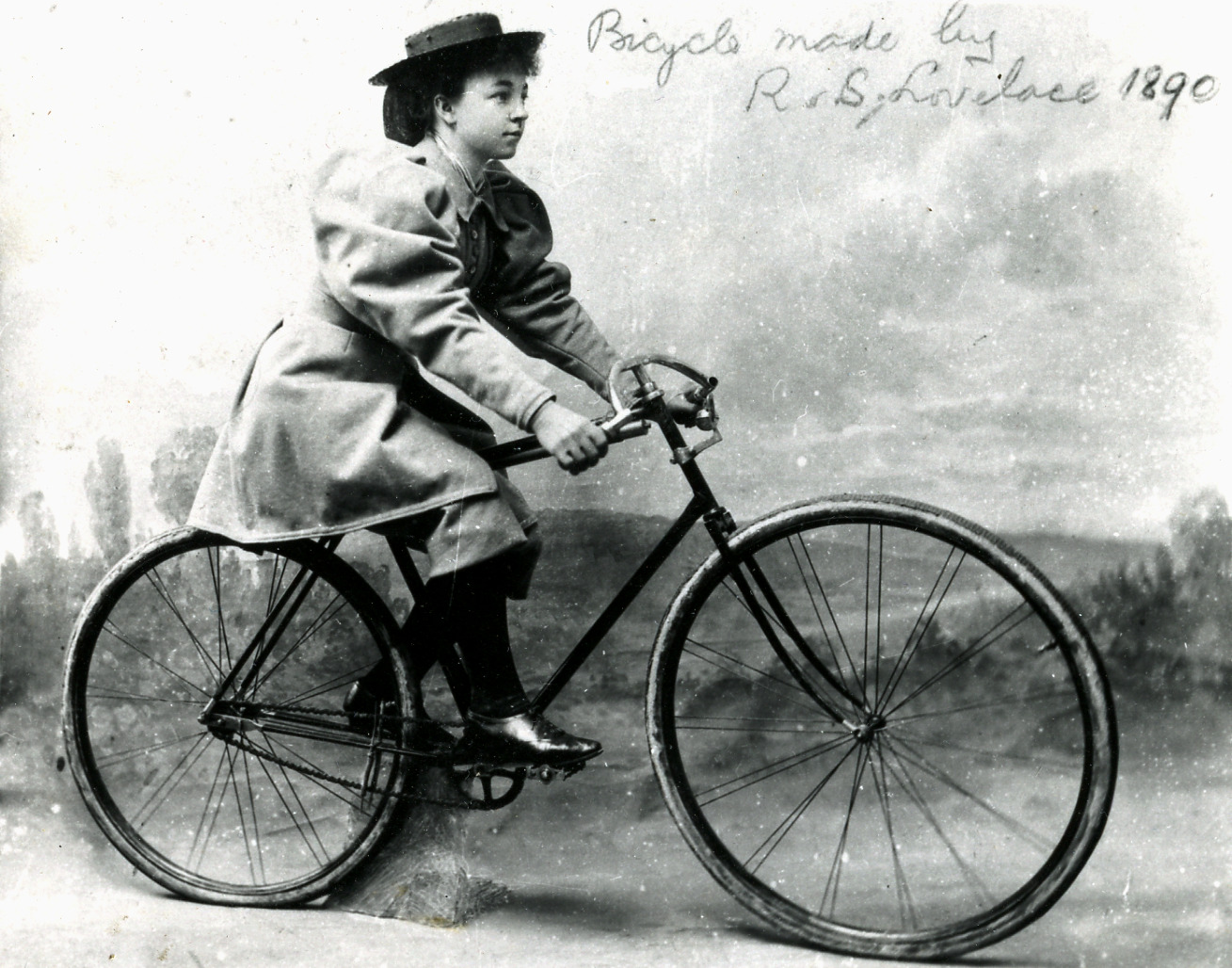
- Born: Teresa Reynolds; 20 August 1877; Newport, Isle of Wight, England
- Died: 13 July 1954 (aged 77); Barnet, Hertfordshire, England
- Occupation: Traffic safety officer
- Known for: London–Brighton cycle ride
- Spouse: Montague Salisbury Main (m. 1908)

Teresa "Tessie" Reynolds (20 August 1877 – 13 July 1954) was an English cyclist who in 1893 set a record for cycling from Brighton to London and back in 8 hours 30 minutes. She was aged sixteen at the time and dressed in "rational" clothing: pantaloons, a shirt, and coat. The outfit, which was likely made for her by her sister, led to significant publicity and her ride came to be regarded as a milestone for women's rights and sports. The record was broken in 1894 and Reynolds went on to be a London traffic safety officer.

== Early life ==
"Every wheelman who has managed to retain a belief in the innate modesty and sense of becomingness in the opposite sex, will hear with real pain, not unmixed with disgust, of what we will call a lamentable incident that took place on the Brighton road early last Sunday"

— Cycling magazine's description of the feat

Tessie Reynolds was born on the Isle of Wight and grew up in Brighton, the eldest of 11 children. Her father, Robert James Reynolds, was a gymnastic instructor and cycle agent, who encouraged sports among his children. He was a member of National Cycling Union and Secretary of a cycling club, as well as umpire for professional races. Her mother, Charlotte, ran a boarding house in Kemptown, which specifically catered for cyclists and which Reynolds helped at.

== Record breaking bike ride ==
In September 1893, when Reynolds was sixteen years old, she rode a man's bike 120 miles (190 km) from Brighton to London (Note: The half way point has been reported as both London Bridge and Hyde Park Corner) and back, in 8 hours 30 minutes, thereby setting a record. Her father acted as the time keeper for the ride.

Women's clothes at the time included long dresses and tight corsets, impractical for cycling; so Reynolds instead wore a "rational" outfit of pantaloons "cropped and cinched below the knee", with a shirt and long coat. It is likely that the outfit was made specifically for Reynolds by her sister, Ada, who was a dress maker. The outfit caused outrage, with suggestions that it was inappropriately masculine and that she was cycling in her knickerbockers. The publicity traveled as far as America, and the outfit was promoted by proponents of Victorian dress reform, as Reynolds clearly intended. She was active in promoting dress reform five years prior to the foundation of the local cycling dress reform club and continued to wear the outfit regularly.

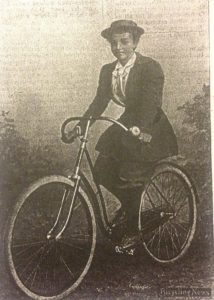
Tessie Reynolds pictured in Bicycling News magazine in 1893

Cycling magazine wrote a scathing report on the "scantiness" of the outfit, complaining of loss of modesty and calling the feat a "lamentable incident". Similarly, the Yorkshire Evening Post pointed out that cycling was not a pleasant sight for a man, but that a woman's "abnormal hips" made it worse. The publicity, despite being negative, helped improve women's rights with the suffragette movement in particular noting it was a big milestone. Further, it helped show that women need not be tied to the street that they grew up in and had a means to travel. Another effect of the publicity was that Reynolds received love letters, including a marriage proposal from a stranger who was apparently significantly older than her. Reynolds and her family took advantage of the celebrity status, with Reynolds promoting a number of female bicycles over the following years, always in rational cycling attire.

The record stood for a year before it was beaten by 42 minutes in September 1894 by E. White from Dover Road Club. Reynold's ride led her to be noted as a key 19th-century cyclist. She was denied the possibility of starting a Brighton branch of the national Female Cycling Association when she was 18, supposedly due to her age and "lack of experience", but more likely due to association with her rational outfit.

== Personal life ==
In 1908, Reynolds married Montague Salisbury Main and moved to Barnet, Hertfordshire (now North London), having three children who all died in childhood. There she became a road safety officer, a role rarely performed by women in London during the 1930s and 1940s. By 1948, her husband died and she focused her work on accident prevention. Reynolds died in 1954, aged 77, with local papers covering her death.

== Legacy ==
In March 2026, Transport for London announced that one of their hire bikes would be named after Tessie Reynolds following public nominations for names of women who have had an impact on making cycling more accessible for women and girls.
