= Lo Fine =

American indie rock band

- Years active: 1998-present
- Labels: Natural Disaster, Pigeon, self-released
- Members: Kevin O'Rourke; Brian Marchese; Thane Thomsen; Bruce Tull; José Ayerve; Peyton Pinkerton; Mark Schwaber; Matt Sutton; Nina Violet; Cara Connolly
- Website: lofine.com

Lo Fine is an indie rock band, and recording project, started in Northampton, Massachusetts by singer/songwriter and multi-instrumentalist Kevin O'Rourke in 1998. Although primarily the work of singer and multi-instrumentalist O'Rourke, his early collaborators (1999-2007) included musicians Brian Marchese (drums), Thane Thomsen (bass), and Mark Schwaber (guitar), as well as Bruce Tull (guitar/pedal steel) of the Scud Mountain Boys, and José Ayerve. They have released three full-length albums, and three EPs, notably incorporating home recordings with studio tracks on their early releases. The music is noted for its slow pace, quiet volume, and poetic lyrics, as well as being described as meditative, gentle, and melancholy.

O'Rourke's vocals and approach have drawn comparisons to Matthew Sweet, Vic Chesnutt, as well as Will Oldham, Mark Kozelek, Built to Spill's Doug Martsch and Centro-Matic's Will Johnson.

== Discography ==
=== EPs ===
- lo fine (self-released, 1999)
- Slow to a Crawl EP (Pigeon, 2002)
- Migraine Errata EP (Unreleased & B-Sides 2001-2006) (West Main Development, 2007)

=== LPs ===
- Nine (Natural Disaster, 2001)
- Not For Us Two (Pigeon, 2007)
- Want is a Great Need (ASR, 2013)

=== Compilations ===
- Ciao My Shining Star: The Songs of Mark Mulcahy (Shout! Factory, 2009)
- Ball of Wax 27 (Ball of Wax Audio Quarterly, Winter 2012)
