= Winterpills =

American indie rock band

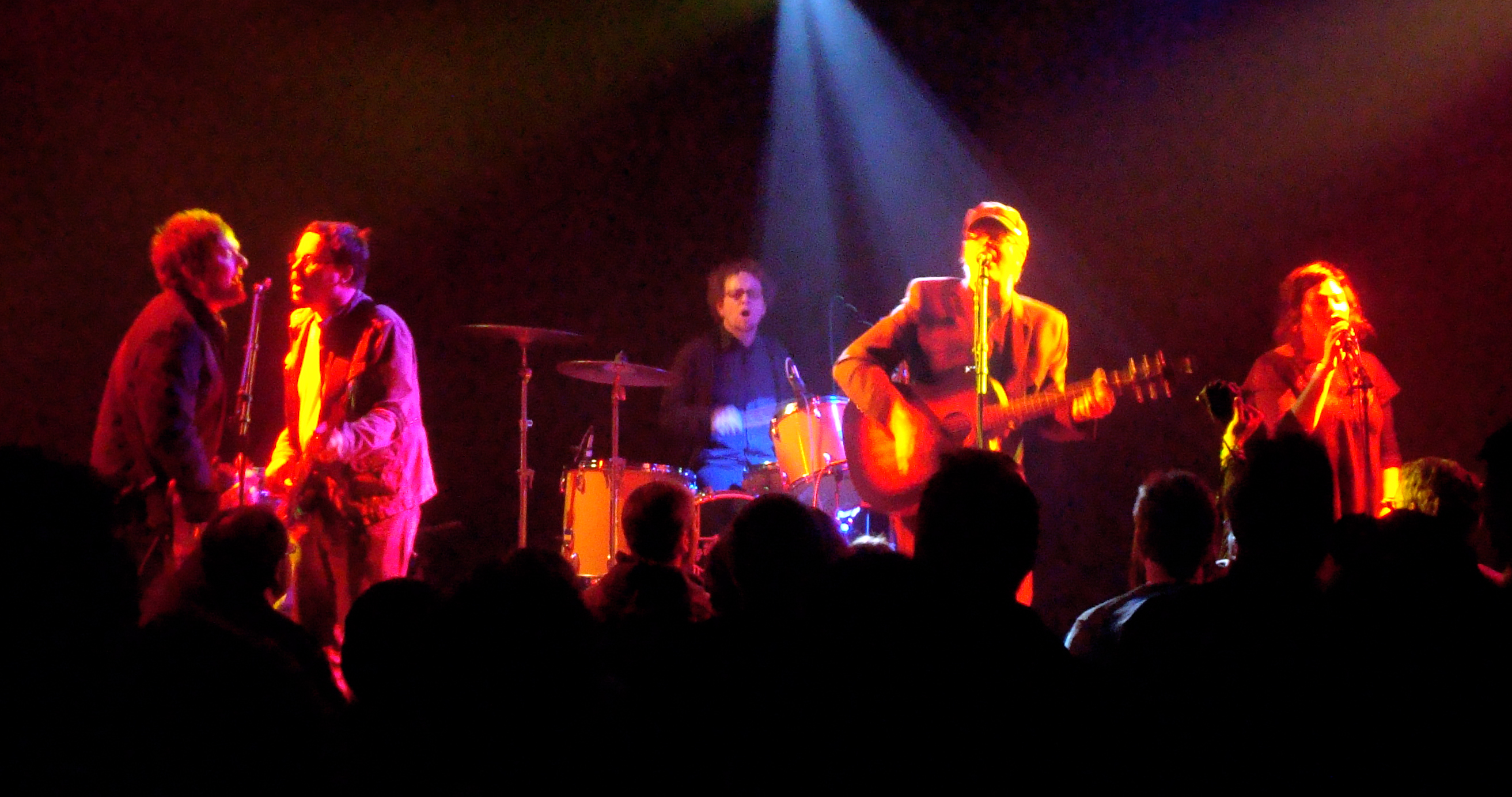
- Winterpills performing at Toad's Place December 11th, 2009

Background information
- Origin: Northampton, MA, U.S.
- Genres: Indie rock
- Years active: 2003–present
- Labels: Signature Sounds
- Members: Philip Price; Flora Reed; Dave Hower; Dennis Crommett; Max Germer
- Website: http://www.winterpills.com/

Winterpills are an American indie rock band from Northampton, Massachusetts, United States. Its members are Philip Price, Flora Reed, Dave Hower, Dennis Crommett and Max Germer, sometimes joined on tour and in studio by Brian Akey, José Ayerve and Henning Ohlenbusch. They released their debut eponymous album in 2005 on Signature Sounds, and their second album on the same label was released in 2007, titled The Light Divides. Their third album, Central Chambers, was released in 2008, also on Signature Sounds, and a vinyl 7" single of "Broken Arm"/"A Folded Cloth" was released in the UK in 2009 on Riot Act Records. A 6-song EP, Tuxedo of Ashes, was released in 2010. All My Lovely Goners was released in 2012, and Love Songs in 2016.

== History ==
As veteran musicians of the Northampton indie music scene, the five members of Winterpills formed from a group of friends "hanging out at Dennis [Crommett]'s house" into a band in the winter of 2003. They began playing out regionally in New England the following spring, and released their eponymous album in 2005. Winterpills was received warmly by critics—garnering comparisons to The Byrds, Simon and Garfunkel, and Elliott Smith—and landed in the Top 100 for both iTunes and Amazon.com. The band carved out a sound characterized by acoustic folk-pop, male-female harmonies, and melancholic songwriting by Price.

Their albums have received high praise by The New York Times, Washington Post, No Depression, The Utne Reader, USA Today, Paste Magazine, Mojo, The Village Voice, and the Boston Globe, among others They have shared the stage with Grant-Lee Phillips, Vampire Weekend, St. Vincent, Cake, Lisa Germano, Syd Straw, Juana Molina, Ladybug Transistor, The Mountain Goats, Crowded House, Erin McKeown, Fountains of Wayne, Alejandro Escovedo, Rainer Maria, Martha Wainwright, Josh Ritter among others. While touring extensively the band played Mountain Stage on NPR, and were featured on NPR's Weekend Edition and World Cafe, and XM Radio's Loft Sessions.

== Members ==
- Philip Price (vocals, guitar)
- Flora Reed (vocals, keyboard)
- Dennis Crommett (guitar, vocals)
- Dave Hower (drums)
- Max Germer (bass)
- Brian Akey (bass)

== Discography ==
=== Albums ===
- Winterpills (2005, Signature Sounds/Soft Alarm)
- The Light Divides (2007, Signature Sounds/Soft Alarm)
- Central Chambers (2008, Signature Sounds/Soft Alarm)
- All My Lovely Goners (2012, Signature Sounds/Soft Alarm)
- Echolalia (2014, Signature Sounds)
- Love Songs (2016, Signature Sounds)
- This Is How We Dance (2025)

=== EPs ===
- Tuxedo of Ashes (2010, Signature Sounds/Soft Alarm)

=== Singles ===
- "Colorblind" (digital single, 2017, Signature Sounds)
- "Take Away the Words" (radio promo, 2009, Signature Sounds)
- "Broken Arm" (7", 2009, Signature Sounds)
