= The Warrior's Code =

Studio album by Dropkick Murphys
- Released: June 21, 2005
- Recorded: 2004–2005
- Studio: Q Division (Somerville)
- Genre: Celtic punk
- Length: 41:04
- Label: Hellcat
- Producers: Ken Casey; David Bianco

Dropkick Murphys chronology
Singles Collection, Volume 2 (2005)	The Warrior's Code (2005)	The Meanest of Times (2007)

Singles from The Warrior's Code
- 1. "Tessie" Released: 2004; 2. "Sunshine Highway" Released: 2005; 3. "The Warrior's Code" Released: 2005; 4. "I'm Shipping Up to Boston" Released: 2006

The Warrior's Code is the fifth studio album by the Celtic punk band Dropkick Murphys. Released in June 2005, it is also their bestselling. It features a dedication to Lowell's own "Irish" Micky Ward who is featured on the album's cover and is the subject of the album's title track. It is also their final record with Hellcat Records before moving to their own vanity label, Born & Bred Records. The album was the first to feature band members Tim Brennan and Scruffy Wallace.

The album features one of the band's biggest and most well known singles, "I'm Shipping Up to Boston", which the band originally released on the "Fields of Athenry" single, although it was re-recorded for The Warrior's Code. The band released the song on their own as a single in 2006. However, it became a hit after being featured in the Oscar-winning movie The Departed and its soundtrack.

The band filmed music videos for the singles of "Sunshine Highway", "The Warrior's Code" and two videos for "I'm Shipping Up to Boston", the second was used featuring footage from The Departed. The album also features the bonus track "Tessie" which was released as its own single and music video in August 2004.

== Songs and composition ==
"Your Spirit's Alive" was written in memory of the band's friend Greg "Chickenman" Riley, who died in a motorcycle accident in 2004. It also references former Boston Bruins player Garnet Bailey and Massachusetts-born hockey player Mark Bavis, who both died during the September 11 attacks.

"The Warrior's Code" is about Lowell, Massachusetts boxing legend Micky Ward, who is also shown on the album's cover. The song would later be used in the 2010 film The Fighter, a biopic about Ward.

"Captain Kelly's Kitchen" is another of the band's traditional arrangements.

"Sunshine Highway" was the first single from this album and has been featured on Royal Caribbean's Sports' Deck, even though the song is about drug rehabilitation.

"The Green Fields of France" is a cover of the anti-war ballad by Eric Bogle.

The lyrics to "I'm Shipping Up to Boston" come from unpublished Woody Guthrie lyrics, consisting of a short rant by a sailor looking for a wooden leg in Boston. It is the band's second adaptation of a Woody Guthrie song, the first being "Gonna Be a Blackout Tonight" on their previous studio album, Blackout.

"Wicked Sensitive Crew" was written in response to accusations that the band's music and image promoted violence. The song includes the lyric "I ain't ashamed I cried when Mickey died in Rocky II", although Mickey actually died of a heart attack after a confrontation with Clubber Lang in Rocky III. The band actually address this in the album credits, stating that "Mickey actually died in Rocky 3 but, hey, sue us, two rhymed better."

"Last Letter Home" is the story of a correspondence between American Sgt. Andrew Farrar and his family before his death in the current Iraq War. With the Farrar family's permission, the band released the song as a single. All of the proceeds went to the family. The band also performed an acoustic version of the song "Fields of Athenry" at his funeral; the recording was included as the B-side for the single.

"Tessie" is a reworking of a Boston Red Sox rally song. The song is listed as a bonus track, as it had been previously released on the Tessie EP in 2004, the same year the Red Sox won their first championship in 86 years.

A second bonus track titled "Hatebomb" can be found on the Japanese release.

== Reception ==
Professional ratings
Review scores
Source	Rating
Allmusic	3.5/5 stars
PopMatters	7/10 stars
Punknews.org	4/5 stars

The album received mostly positive reviews from critics. Allmusic gave the album a rating of 3.5 out of five stars, praising the "alternating lead vocals, a tag team of rage and bravado." PopMatters gave the album a mostly positive review and commented on the band's musical versatility: "They can do straightforward punk rock ("Your Spirit's Alive") or straightforward Irish folk ("The Green Fields of France"). They can mix it up, and write a punk rock song that sounds like an Irish standard, (the title track, which features a healthy mix of bagpipes and mandolin)." Punknews.org had similar praise for the album, stating: "This is a dynamic record that frequently changes gears between faster punk and hardcore tracks and more subtle renditions of traditional material. While they've not departed from their established style, it seems that the Murphys' songwriting is in perfect sync with their ambition."

== Track listing ==
All tracks are written by Dropkick Murphys, except where noted.

No.	Title	Writer(s)	Length
1.	"Your Spirit's Alive"		2:21
2.	"The Warrior's Code"		2:30
3.	"Captain Kelly's Kitchen"	Traditional	2:48
4.	"The Walking Dead"		2:07
5.	"Sunshine Highway"		3:22
6.	"Wicked Sensitive Crew"		2:59
7.	"The Burden"		2:55
8.	"Citizen C.I.A."		1:28
9.	"The Green Fields of France (No Man's Land)"	Eric Bogle	4:46
10.	"Take It and Run"		2:44
11.	"I'm Shipping Up to Boston"	Dropkick Murphys, Woody Guthrie	2:34
12.	"The Auld Triangle"	Brendan Behan	2:41
13.	"Last Letter Home"		3:32
14.	"Tessie" (bonus track)	Will R. Anderson	4:16
Total length:			41:02

Japanese edition bonus track
No.	Title	Length
15.	"Hatebomb"	1:12
Total length:		42:14

== Singles ==
- "Sunshine Highway"
- "The Warrior's Code"
- "I'm Shipping Up to Boston"
- "Tessie" (released in 2004) #89 US Modern Rock Charts

== Citizen I.C.E. ==
On February 4, 2026, the Dropkick Murphys along with hardcore band Haywire released a re-written version of "Citizen C.I.A. re-naming it "Citizen I.C.E.". The song will appear on a split album by the two bands titled New England Forever which will be released on March 17, 2026. “As Americans are being executed in the street, we feel it is our duty to raise consciousness, and be one of the voices speaking against this nightmare. ‘Citizen I.C.E.’ is FOR THE PEOPLE. Stand strong against tyranny. Use it however you want. In Solidarity, with Love, Dropkick Murphys” the band said in a statement.

== Personnel ==
=== Dropkick Murphys ===
- Al Barr – vocals
- Ken Casey – bass, vocals
- Matt Kelly – drums, bodhrán, vocals
- James Lynch – guitar, vocals
- Marc Orrell – guitar, accordion, vocals
- Scruffy Wallace – bagpipes
- Tim Brennan – mandolin, tin whistle, acoustic guitar

=== Additional personnel ===
- Laura Casey – viola, cello
- Marco Urban – vocals
- Josephine Lyons – vocals
- Tom O'Connell – vocals
- Tom Madden – vocals
- Anders Geering – vocals
- Lance Burnett – vocals
- Johnny Damon – backing vocals on "Tessie"
- Bronson Arroyo – backing vocals on "Tessie"
- Lenny DiNardo – backing vocals on "Tessie"
- Jeff Horrigan – backing vocals on "Tessie"
- Bill Janovitz – backing vocals on "Tessie"
- Dr. Charles Stienberg – backing vocals on "Tessie"
- Joe Castiglione – voice sample on "Tessie"

== Charts ==
Chart performance
Chart (2005)	Peak position
Australian Albums (ARIA)	80
Austrian Albums (Ö3 Austria)	72
Belgian Albums (Ultratop Flanders)	59
Belgian Alternative Albums (Ultratop Flanders)	46
Dutch Albums (Album Top 100)	76
Dutch Alternative Albums (Alternative Top 30)	14
French Albums (SNEP)	185
German Albums (Offizielle Top 100)	51
Swedish Albums (Sverigetopplistan)	33
UK Independent Albums (Official Charts)	20
UK Rock & Metal Albums (Official Charts)	19
US Billboard 200	48
US Independent Albums (Billboard)	2

== Certifications ==
Certifications
Region	Certification	Certified units/sales
United States (RIAA)	Gold	500,000^{‡}
^{‡} Sales+streaming figures based on certification alone.
