= Royal Rooters =

American baseball fan club

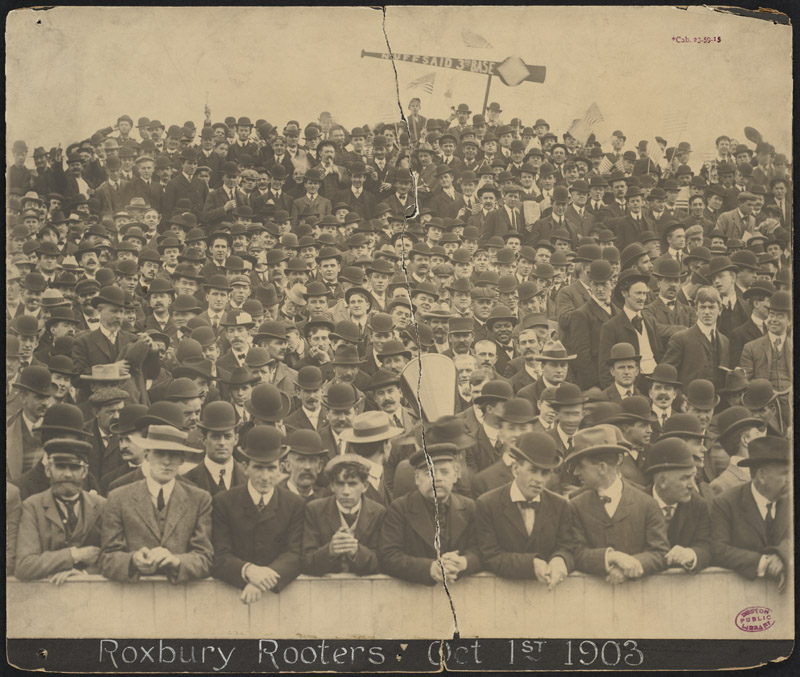
The Royal Rooters in 1903

The Royal Rooters were a fan club for Boston's professional baseball team in the American League in the early 20th century. The team was known as the Boston Americans during the 1901–1907 seasons, and has been known as the Boston Red Sox since the 1908 season.

== History ==
=== Royal Rooters ===
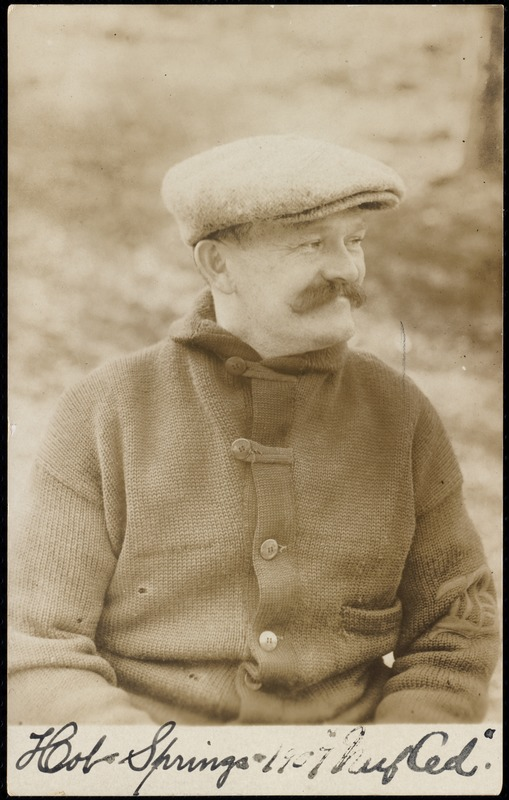
Michael T. McGreevy in 1907

The Royal Rooters were led by Michael T. McGreevy, nicknamed "Nuf Ced", owner of the 3rd Base Saloon in Boston. While McGreevy was certainly the spiritual (in both libations and foundations) leader of the Royal Rooters, Mayor of Boston John F. Fitzgerald, the maternal grandfather of John F. Kennedy, served as chairman for a while, and during that time, M. J. Regan was the secretary. Other members included C. J. Lavis, L. Watson, T. S. Dooley, J. Keenan, and W. Cahill.

On game days the Royal Rooters marched in procession from the 3rd Base Saloon to the Huntington Avenue Grounds, which was the team's home field before Fenway Park opened in 1912. The Rooters had a reserved section of seats along the third base line, close enough to the field to intimidate or distract opposing players with their insults and vicious taunts. The 1912 World Series went down in Rooter history as the Rooters' seats on “Duffy's Cliff” were sold to other fans; the Rooters became angry and mounted police were called in to stop the riot.

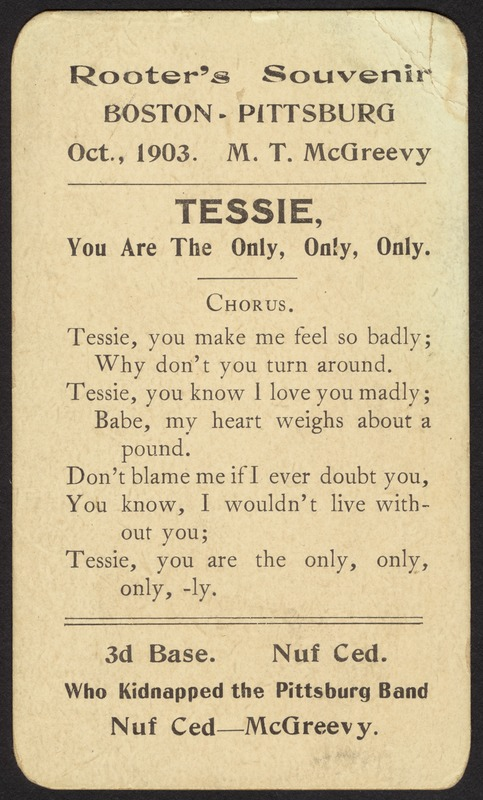
Royal Rooters souvenir card with lyrics to "Tessie"

=== "Tessie" ===
The Royal Rooters' theme song was "Tessie". Made popular by singer Billy Murray, it was from the Broadway musical The Silver Slipper, which ran for less than six months. The Rooters sang "Tessie" at games to encourage their team, while simultaneously distracting and frustrating the opposition. They were especially important in the first World Series, in 1903, when the Americans played the Pittsburgh Pirates. The Royal Rooters went to Pittsburgh and sing "Tessie" to distract the opposing players, especially Honus Wagner. After falling into a three games to one deficit, Boston rallied to win the nine-game Series with four straight victories.

=== McGreevy's 3rd Base Saloon ===
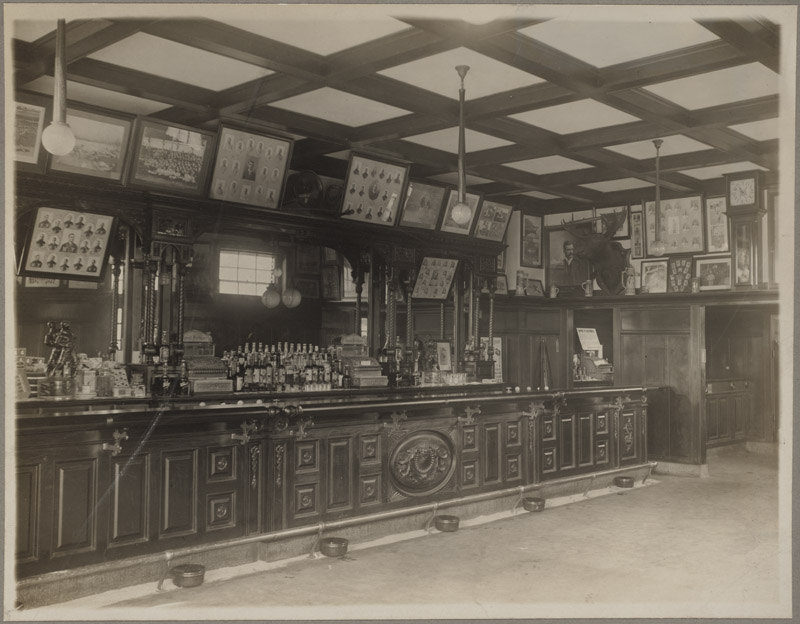
McGreevy's 3rd Base Saloon in 1916

In 1894, McGreevy opened his 3rd Base Saloon. Located in the Roxbury neighborhood of Boston, it was the place to be for ballplayers, politicians, and gamblers, so named for being "the last stop before home." Walls were decorated with historic pictures from McGreevy's own collection and memorabilia he got from friends such as Cy Young. The light fixtures were made from bats used by Red Sox stars and a painted portrait of McGreevy that hung above the bar looked down upon customers. McGreevy's was America's first documented sports-themed bar.

In 1920, the bar was forced to close due to prohibition. McGreevy leased the building to the City of Boston to serve as the Roxbury Crossing branch of the Boston Public Library. In 1923, McGreevy donated a majority of the plethora of memorabilia and famous baseball photography to the Boston Public Library. During 1978–1981, almost 25 percent of the collection was stolen. Approximately 20 photographs have been recovered, but 36 remain unaccounted for.

== Modern revivals ==
=== Royal Rooters ===
The spirit of the Royal Rooters lives on via a group known as the "Royal Rooters of Red Sox Nation". The current Rooters are based in the Boston area and meet informally for Red Sox games as well as for "outings" in various locations around the country. There is a fairly large contingent in New York City, and their base has been the Riviera Café in the West Village. The present-day members of Red Sox Nation kept in touch most often through a dedicated website, redsoxnation.net, which has since gone defunct. The combination message board, fan forum, and blog had several thousand members.

=== "Tessie" ===
The band Dropkick Murphys released a re-working of "Tessie" in 2004. Their version became the official song of the Boston Red Sox 2004 World Series run and the band was able to share in the experience of the Red Sox winning the World Series championship. Their version of "Tessie" is still played at Red Sox games.
