= Tessie =

Two songs associated with the Boston Red Sox

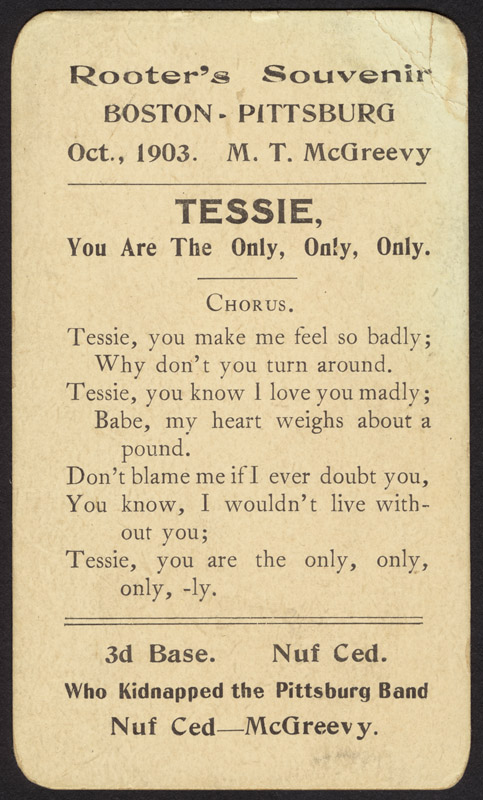
Souvenir card from the 1903 World Series with the lyrics of "Tessie"

"Tessie" is both the longtime anthem of Major League Baseball (MLB)'s Boston Red Sox and a 2004 song by the punk rock group Dropkick Murphys. The original "Tessie" was from the 1902 Broadway musical The Silver Slipper. The newer song, written in 2004, recounts how the singing of the original "Tessie" by the Royal Rooters fan club helped the Boston Americans win the first World Series in 1903. The name Tessie itself is a diminutive form used with several names, including Esther, Tess, and Theresa/Teresa.

== Broadway and Royal Rooters version ==
The original version of "Tessie (You Are the Only, Only, Only)" was written by Will R. Anderson and was featured in the Broadway musical The Silver Slipper, which ran for 160 performances between October 27, 1902, and March 14, 1903. The song was about a woman singing to her beloved parakeet "Tessie".

While a popular tune, the song gained greater fame when it was adopted as a rallying cry by the Royal Rooters, a collection of loyal fans led by Michael T. McGreevy, informally known as "Nuf Ced" McGreevy, owner of the 3rd Base saloon. McGreevy earned his nickname "Nuf Ced" due to the way he kept peace in his bar: when he grew frustrated with arguments over the Boston Americans (who would later be renamed the Red Sox) and the Boston Braves (who would later move to Milwaukee and, eventually, Atlanta), he would pound his hand on the bar and declare "'Nuff [enough] said!". Boston mayor John "Honey Fitz" Fitzgerald, grandfather of President John F. Kennedy, was a member of the Royal Rooters.

After the first four games of the 1903 World Series, Boston was down 1–3 to the Pittsburgh Pirates. (It was a best-of-nine series; five wins were needed to win the series.) The Royal Rooters began rallying their team with every song they could think of; ultimately "Tessie" helped win the day. There are stories that the Royal Rooters actually traveled to Pittsburgh and hired a band to play "Tessie" to annoy the Pirates on their home field. Pittsburgh outfielder Tommy Leach credited at least part of Boston's win to "that damn 'Tessie' song." He continued: "It was a real hum-dinger of a song, but it sort of got on your nerves after a while."

Boston won Game 5 and went on to win Games 6, 7, and 8 to win the Series. The Boston fans remembered "Tessie" fondly through the years; Burt Mustin, who decades later became a prolific "old man" character actor in movies and television, was still regaling audiences with "Tessie" stories while in his nineties.

The chorus to the original "Tessie" goes:

Tessie, you make me feel so badly.
Why don't you turn around?
Tessie, you know I love you madly.
Babe, my heart weighs about a pound.
Don't blame me if I ever doubt you,
You know I wouldn't live without you.
Tessie, you are the only, only, only.

The fans began inventing their own lyrics to taunt the Pittsburgh players, such as:

Honus, why do you hit so badly?
Take a back seat and sit down
Honus, at bat you look so sadly.
Hey, why don't you get out of town?

etc.

The Rooters stopped singing in 1918. The Red Sox won the World Series in 1918 but then endured an 86-year drought before winning again in 2004, the same year a re-release of "Tessie" was issued by the Dropkick Murphys.

In the 2000s a group of Red Sox fans recreated the track with those lyrics and an additional two stanzas in addition to finishing the Wagner stanza.

Honus, why do you hit so badly?
Take a back seat and sit down
Honus, at bat you look so sadly.
Hey, why don't you get out of town?
Go find another team to hit for
Pittsburgh is just the pits and therefore
Honus, you are a phony phony phony

They also wrote a stanza on Yankees slugger Alex Rodriguez:

A-Rod you're overpaid overrated
Why do we hate you so
Your contract should be terminated
Because you don't deserve to be making all that dough (300 Million)
You almost got away with cheatin'
But the Red Sox weren't the team to be beatin'
A-Rod you are a hanky panky Yankee.

Yankee captain Derek Jeter also got a stanza.

== Dropkick Murphys version ==
In 2004, the Boston-area celtic punk group Dropkick Murphys recorded a cover of "Tessie", released on an EP of the same name. In the music video, Tessie the "broom girl," was played by Colleen Reilly. The Dropkicks said it was their intent to "bring back the spirit of the Rooters and to put the Red Sox back on top." The goal of the Dropkicks was realized when later that year the Boston Red Sox won their first World Series in 86 years. The song is also featured as the bonus track on their June 2005 release The Warrior's Code with a lead-in from the WEEI broadcast of the final play in the 2004 World Series: "Swing and a ground ball, stabbed by Foulke. He has it. He underhands to first. And the Boston Red Sox are the World Champions. For the first time in 86 years, the Red Sox have won baseball's world championship. Can you believe it?" -Joe Castiglione

The second "Tessie"—which featured backing vocals from Red Sox players Johnny Damon, Bronson Arroyo, and Lenny DiNardo, Red Sox Vice President of Public Affairs Dr. Charles Steinberg; and Boston Herald sportswriter Jeff Horrigan (who co-wrote the new lyrics with the Dropkick Murphys)—has become a theme song for the Red Sox and tells the story of the Royal Rooters singing the original "Tessie".

The song is featured in the soundtrack to the 2005 movie, Fever Pitch, and is the song used in the closing credits to the VHS and DVD review of the 2004 World Series, a video that was produced by Major League Baseball Productions. The video game MVP Baseball 2005 features the song; while Dropkick Murphys vocalist Ken Casey was unaware of how it appeared in the soundtrack, he appreciated its role in "gaining us some new younger fans around the country that may not have been previously aware of its connection to baseball and the Red Sox."

In addition to "Tessie", the EP includes "Fields of Athenry", "Nut Rocker" (an instrumental rock version of the Boston Bruins theme song), "The Burden" as performed live on WBCN, "Tessie (Old Timey Baseball Version)" in which the song is accompanied primarily by a ballpark organ, as well as a music video for "Tessie." Proceeds from the sale of the EP went to benefit the Red Sox Foundation. ("Nut Rocker" inspired "Nutty" by The Ventures, which was long associated with the Boston Bruins hockey team, as it was the theme song for Bruins telecasts on WSBK-TV.)

"Tessie" is the second of three songs played after every Red Sox win at Fenway Park, the first being "Dirty Water" by The Standells. The third is "Joy to the World" by Three Dog Night.

Trot Nixon used "Tessie" as his at-bat intro music when he played for the Red Sox.

"Tessie" was played at the end of regulation, prior to the start of overtime during the National Hockey League's 2010 Winter Classic at Fenway Park.

A synthesized version of "Tessie" is used by Red Sox ticketing, as the signal a customer has been selected from the team's virtual waiting room to purchase tickets during busy periods.

The Dropkick Murphys tell this version of the story in the liner notes of their album The Warrior's Code:

We recorded this song in June 2004 and after giving it to the Red Sox told anyone that would listen that this song would guarantee a World Series victory. Obviously no one listened to us or took us seriously. We were three outs away from elimination in game 4 at the hands of the Yankees and receiving death threats from friends, family, & strangers telling us to stay away from the Red Sox and any other Boston sports team and get out of town. Luckily for us things turned around for the Red Sox and the rest is history.

== Inspiration for Red Sox mascots ==
In the winter of 2015–16, it was stated that the as-yet "unknown" young sister of the popular Red Sox mascot Wally the Green Monster, aptly named Tessie, was going to join her famous "older brother" at Red Sox games starting in the 2016 MLB season.
