= The State of Massachusetts =

Single by Dropkick Murphys

from the album The Meanest of Times
- A-side: "The State of Massachusetts"; "The Thick Skin of Defiance"
- B-side: "Breakdown"; "Forever"
- Released: February 4, 2008
- Recorded: April – June 2007
- Studio: The Outpost (Stoughton, Massachusetts)
- Genre: Celtic punk
- Length: 3:52
- Label: Born & Bred; Cooking Vinyl
- Songwriter: Dropkick Murphys
- Producer: Dropkick Murphys

Dropkick Murphys singles chronology
"I'm Shipping Up to Boston" (2006)	"The State of Massachusetts" (2008)	"Rose Tattoo" (2012)

"The State of Massachusetts" is a song by American rock band Dropkick Murphys. It was released on February 4, 2008, as the lead single from their sixth studio album, The Meanest of Times. The song is about the effects of drugs on individuals and their families. Although the title is an obvious play on words, as Massachusetts is a state, it is actually one of four states who are officially known as commonwealths. "The State of Massachusetts" was one of the 100-most-played songs on U.S. modern rock radio in October 2007. By January 2008, the song had become one of the 60-most-played alternative rock songs in the United States. The song was #83 on Rolling Stone's list of the 100 Best Songs of 2007. It is the theme song to the MTV show Nitro Circus. The music video was filmed on location in the unused and abandoned Curley Auditorium on the Long Island Health Campus in Boston Harbor. The auditorium is located right next to one of the City of Boston's largest emergency homeless shelters, the Long Island Shelter.

In 2013, six years after its release, the song made its first chart appearance on a Billboard chart when it peaked at number 14 on the Billboard Rock Songs chart following the Boston Marathon bombing.

== Track listing ==
=== 7" vinyl ===
Side A
No.	Title	Length
1.	"The State of Massachusetts"	3:52
2.	"The Thick Skin of Defiance"	2:47

Side B
No.	Title	Length
1.	"Breakdown"	2:27
2.	"Forever"	3:47

== Weekly charts ==
Chart (2013)	Peak position
US Bubbling Under Hot 100 (Billboard)	1
US Hot Rock & Alternative Songs (Billboard)	14
