= Scruffy Wallace =

Canadian bagpipe player

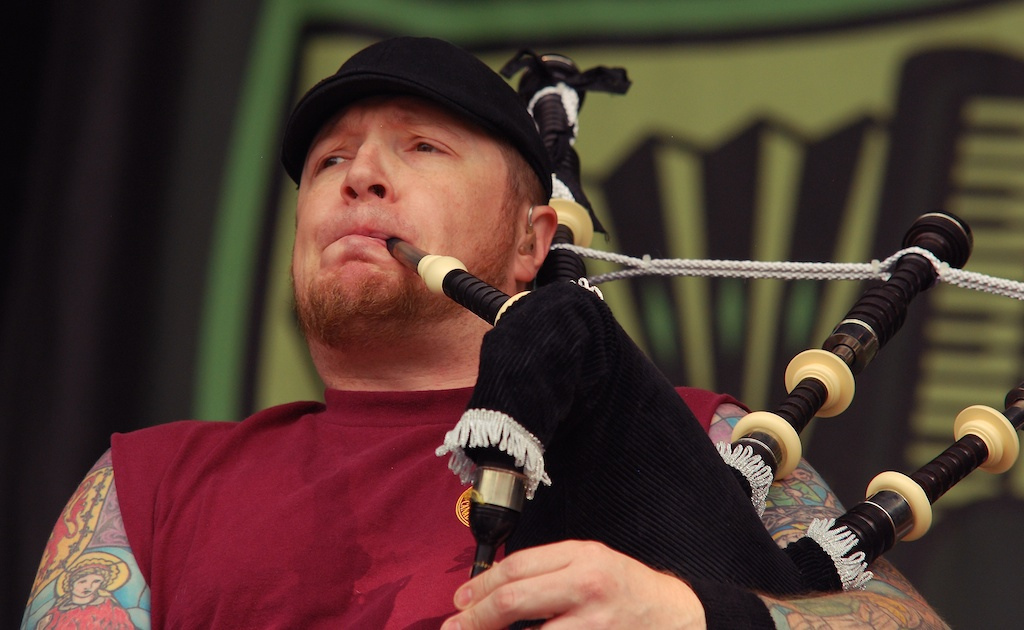
- Wallace performing with Dropkick Murphys in 2011

Background information
- Born: Joshua L. Wallace; United Kingdom
- Genres: Celtic punk
- Occupation: Musician
- Instrument: Bagpipes
- Years active: 2003–present
- Formerly of: Dropkick Murphys, the Mahones

Joshua L. "Scruffy" Wallace is a Canadian bagpipe player best known for his 12-year tenure with the Boston-based Celtic punk group the Dropkick Murphys.

== Early life ==
Wallace was born in the United Kingdom but moved to Canada at a young age. He started playing bagpipes as a teenager and at fifteen joined the 2137 Royal Canadian Army Cadet Corps (The Calgary Highlanders).

== Career ==
Wallace joined the Dropkick Murphys in 2003 and first appeared on their 2005 album The Warrior's Code. He would record four albums with the band before leaving them in June 2015.

Wallace joined the Mahones, another Celtic punk band, in February 2016.

== Personal life ==
Wallace is married with two sons, and the family lives in Dorchester, Massachusetts, a neighborhood of Boston. Speaking on his son possibly learning how to play the bagpipes, Wallace said "I'm not going through what my mother went through. No way. He can be a drummer or something". His favorite drinks are Lagavulin 16-year single malt scotch and Miller High Life. His favorite band is Slayer.
