= Tessy Bamberg-Schitter =

Luxembourgish footballer

Personal information
- Date of birth: 20 June 1980
- Position: Midfielder

Senior career*
| Years | Team | Apps | (Gls) |
- Cebra 01

International career
| 2006–2009 | Luxembourg | 5 | (0) |
- * Club domestic league appearances and goals

Tessy Bamberg-Schitter (born 20 June 1980) is a Luxembourgish football midfielder who has played for the Luxembourg women's national team and FC Cebra 01.
