= 1909 Philadelphia Athletics season =

1909 Philadelphia Athletics
- League: American League
- Ballpark: Shibe Park
- City: Philadelphia
- Record: 95–58 (.621)
- League place: 2nd
- Owners: Benjamin Shibe, Tom Shibe, John Shibe, Connie Mack, Sam Jones, Frank Hough
- Managers: Connie Mack

The 1909 Philadelphia Athletics season involved the A's finishing second in the American League with a record of 95 wins and 58 losses. The A's also moved into the majors' first concrete-and-steel ballpark, Shibe Park.

== Regular season ==
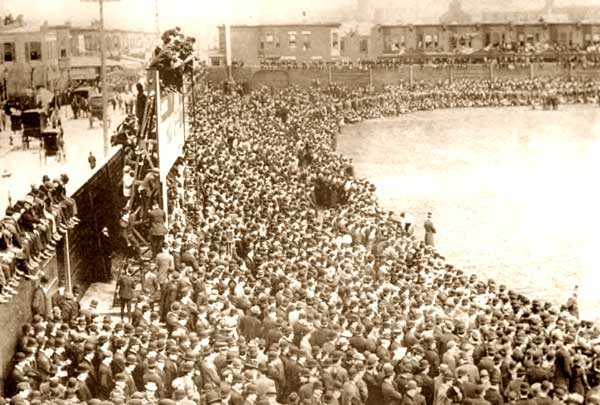
Fans in Shibe Park watching the inaugural game in 1909.

In 1909, the A's were wearing an elephant logo on their sweaters.

=== Season standings ===
American League
Team	W	L	Pct.	GB	Home	Road
Detroit Tigers	98	54	.645	—	57‍–‍19	41‍–‍35
Philadelphia Athletics	95	58	.621	3½	49‍–‍27	46‍–‍31
Boston Red Sox	88	63	.583	9½	47‍–‍28	41‍–‍35
Chicago White Sox	78	74	.513	20	42‍–‍34	36‍–‍40
New York Highlanders	74	77	.490	23½	41‍–‍35	33‍–‍42
Cleveland Naps	71	82	.464	27½	39‍–‍37	32‍–‍45
St. Louis Browns	61	89	.407	36	40‍–‍37	21‍–‍52
Washington Senators	42	110	.276	56	27‍–‍48	15‍–‍62

=== Record vs. opponents ===
1909 American League record Sources:
Team	BOS	CWS	CLE	DET	NYH	PHA	SLB	WSH
Boston	—	13–9–1	14–8	9–13	13–9	10–11	13–7	16–6
Chicago	9–13–1	—	8–13–1	6–15–2	14–8–1	12–10	10–12–1	19–3–1
Cleveland	8–14	13–8–1	—	8–14–1	8–14	9–13	14–8	11–11
Detroit	13–9	15–6–2	14–8–1	—	14–8	8–14	18–3–1	16–6–2
New York	9–13	8–14–1	14–8	8–14	—	8–14	13–8–1	14–6
Philadelphia	11–10	10–12	13–9	14–8	14–8	—	14–8	19–3
St. Louis	7–13	12–10–1	8–14	3–18–1	8–13–1	8–14	—	15–7–1
Washington	6–16	3–19–1	11–11	6–16–2	6–14	3–19	7–15–1	—

=== Roster ===
1909 Philadelphia Athletics
Roster
Pitchers: Tommy Atkins; Chief Bender; Jack Coombs; Jimmy Dygert; Harry Krause; John Kull; Cy Morgan; Eddie Plank; Biff Schlitzer; Rube Vickers	Catchers: Jack Lapp; Ed Larkin; Paddy Livingston; Doc Powers; Ira Thomas; Infielders: Frank Baker; Jack Barry; Eddie Collins; Jim Curry; Harry Davis; Stuffy McInnis; Simon Nicholls; Morrie Rath	Outfielders: Scotty Barr; Bob Ganley; Topsy Hartsel; Heinie Heitmuller; Joe Jackson; Danny Murphy; Rube Oldring; Amos Strunk	Manager: Connie Mack

== Player stats ==
=== Batting ===
==== Starters by position ====
Note: Pos = Position; G = Games played; AB = At bats; H = Hits; Avg. = Batting average; HR = Home runs; RBI = Runs batted in

Pos	Player	G	AB	H	Avg.	HR	RBI
C	Ira Thomas	84	256	57	.223	0	31
1B	Harry Davis	149	530	142	.268	4	75
2B	Eddie Collins	153	571	198	.347	3	56
SS	Jack Barry	124	409	88	.215	1	23
3B	Frank Baker	148	541	165	.305	4	85
OF	Rube Oldring	90	326	75	.230	1	28
OF	Bob Ganley	80	274	54	.197	0	9
OF	Danny Murphy	149	541	152	.281	5	69

==== Other batters ====
Note: G = Games played; AB = At bats; H = Hits; Avg. = Batting average; HR = Home runs; RBI = Runs batted in

Player	G	AB	H	Avg.	HR	RBI
Topsy Hartsel	83	267	72	.270	1	18
Heinie Heitmuller	64	210	60	.286	0	15
Paddy Livingston	64	175	41	.234	0	15
Simon Nicholls	21	71	15	.211	0	3
Jack Lapp	21	56	19	.339	0	10
Scotty Barr	22	51	4	.078	0	1
Stuffy McInnis	19	46	11	.239	1	4
Amos Strunk	11	35	4	.114	0	2
Morrie Rath	7	26	7	.269	0	3
Shoeless Joe Jackson	5	17	3	.176	0	3
Ed Larkin	2	6	1	.167	0	1
Doc Powers	1	4	1	.250	0	0
Jim Curry	1	4	1	.250	0	0

=== Pitching ===
==== Starting pitchers ====
Note: G = Games pitched; IP = Innings pitched; W = Wins; L = Losses; ERA = Earned run average; SO = Strikeouts

Player	G	IP	W	L	ERA	SO
Eddie Plank	34	265.1	19	10	1.76	132
Chief Bender	34	250.0	18	8	1.66	161
Cy Morgan	28	228.2	16	11	1.65	81
Jack Coombs	30	205.2	12	11	2.32	97
Tommy Atkins	1	6.0	0	0	4.50	4

==== Other pitchers ====
Note: G = Games pitched; IP = Innings pitched; W = Wins; L = Losses; ERA = Earned run average; SO = Strikeouts

Player	G	IP	W	L	ERA	SO
Harry Krause	32	213.0	18	8	1.39	139
Jimmy Dygert	32	137.1	9	5	2.42	79
Rube Vickers	18	55.2	2	2	3.40	25
Biff Schlitzer	4	13.1	0	3	5.40	6

==== Relief pitchers ====
Note: G = Games pitched; W = Wins; L = Losses; SV = Saves; ERA = Earned run average; SO = Strikeouts

Player	G	W	L	SV	ERA	SO
John Kull	1	1	0	0	3.00	4
