= 1910 Philadelphia Athletics season =

1910 Philadelphia Athletics
- World Series champions American League champions
- League: American League
- Ballpark: Shibe Park
- City: Philadelphia
- Record: 102–48 (.680)
- League place: 1st
- Owners: Benjamin Shibe, Tom Shibe, John Shibe, Connie Mack, Sam Jones, Frank Hough
- Managers: Connie Mack

The 1910 Philadelphia Athletics season was their tenth as a franchise. The team finished first in the American League with a record of 102 wins and 48 losses, winning the pennant by 14½ games over the New York Highlanders. The A's then defeated the Chicago Cubs in the 1910 World Series 4 games to 1.

== Regular season ==
=== Season standings ===
American League
Team	W	L	Pct.	GB	Home	Road
Philadelphia Athletics	102	48	.680	—	57‍–‍19	45‍–‍29
New York Highlanders	88	63	.583	14½	49‍–‍25	39‍–‍38
Detroit Tigers	86	68	.558	18	46‍–‍31	40‍–‍37
Boston Red Sox	81	72	.529	22½	51‍–‍28	30‍–‍44
Cleveland Naps	71	81	.467	32	39‍–‍36	32‍–‍45
Chicago White Sox	68	85	.444	35½	41‍–‍37	27‍–‍48
Washington Senators	66	85	.437	36½	38‍–‍35	28‍–‍50
St. Louis Browns	47	107	.305	57	26‍–‍51	21‍–‍56

=== Record vs. opponents ===
1910 American League record Sources:
Team	BOS	CWS	CLE	DET	NYH	PHA	SLB	WSH
Boston	—	10–12	14–8–3	12–10	9–13–1	4–18	16–6	16–5–1
Chicago	12–10	—	10–12	9–13	8–13–2	8–14–1	12–10	9–13
Cleveland	8–14–3	12–10	—	9–13	8–13	7–14–4	18–4–1	9–13–1
Detroit	10–12	13–9	13–9	—	13–9	9–13	15–7	13–9–1
New York	13–9–1	13–8–2	13–8	9–13	—	9–12	16–6–1	15–7–1
Philadelphia	18–4	14–8–1	14–7–4	13–9	12–9	—	17–5	14–6
St. Louis	6–16	10–12	4–18–1	7–15	6–16–1	5–17	—	9–13–2
Washington	5–16–1	13–9	13–9–1	9–13–1	7–15–1	6–14	13–9–2	—

=== Roster ===
1910 Philadelphia Athletics
Roster
Pitchers: Tommy Atkins; Chief Bender; Jack Coombs; Jimmy Dygert; Harry Krause; Cy Morgan; Eddie Plank; Lefty Russell	Catchers: Pat Donahue; Jack Lapp; Paddy Livingston; Earle Mack; Ira Thomas; Infielders: Frank Baker; Jack Barry; Eddie Collins; Harry Davis; Claud Derrick; Ben Houser; Stuffy McInnis; Morrie Rath	Outfielders: Topsy Hartsel; Heinie Heitmuller; Bris Lord; Danny Murphy; Rube Oldring; Amos Strunk	Manager: Connie Mack

== Player stats ==
= Indicates team leader

=== Batting ===
==== Starters by position ====
Note: Pos = Position; G = Games played; AB = At bats; H = Hits; Avg. = Batting average; HR = Home runs; RBI = Runs batted in

Pos	Player	G	AB	H	Avg.	HR	RBI
C	Jack Lapp	71	192	45	.234	0	17
1B	Harry Davis	139	492	122	.248	1	41
2B	Eddie Collins	153	581	188	.324	3	81
3B	Frank Baker	146	561	159	.283	2	74
SS	Jack Barry	145	487	126	.259	3	60
OF	Bris Lord	70	279	78	.280	1	20
OF	Rube Oldring	134	546	168	.308	4	57
OF	Danny Murphy	151	560	168	.300	4	64

==== Other batters ====
Note: G = Games played; AB = At bats; H = Hits; Avg. = Batting average; HR = Home runs; RBI = Runs batted in

Player	G	AB	H	Avg.	HR	RBI
Topsy Hartsel	90	285	63	.221	0	22
Ira Thomas	60	180	50	.278	1	19
Paddy Livingston	37	120	25	.208	0	9
Heinie Heitmuller	31	111	27	.243	0	7
Stuffy McInnis	19	73	22	.301	0	12
Ben Houser	34	69	13	.188	0	7
Amos Strunk	16	48	16	.333	0	2
Pat Donahue	15	35	5	.143	0	4
Morrie Rath	18	26	4	.154	0	1
Earle Mack	1	4	2	.500	0	0
Claud Derrick	2	1	0	.000	0	0

=== Pitching ===
==== Starting pitchers ====
Note: G = Games pitched; IP = Innings pitched; W = Wins; L = Losses; ERA = Earned run average; SO = Strikeouts

Player	G	IP	W	L	ERA	SO
Jack Coombs	45	353.0	31	9	1.30	224
Cy Morgan	31	290.2	18	12	1.55	134
Eddie Plank	38	250.1	16	10	2.01	123
Chief Bender	30	250.0	23	5	1.58	155
Harry Krause	16	112.1	6	6	2.88	60

==== Other pitchers ====
Note: G = Games pitched; IP = Innings pitched; W = Wins; L = Losses; ERA = Earned run average; SO = Strikeouts

Player	G	IP	W	L	ERA	SO
Jimmy Dygert	19	99.1	4	4	2.54	59
Tommy Atkins	15	57.0	3	2	2.68	29
Lefty Russell	1	9.0	1	0	0.00	5

== Cuban-American Major League Clubs Series ==
The Athletics, as well as the Detroit Tigers, Habana club and the Almendares club, competed in the second Cuban-American Major League Clubs Series in 1910.

== 1910 World Series ==
AL Philadelphia Athletics (4) vs. NL Chicago Cubs (1)

Game	Score	Date	Location	Attendance
1	Cubs – 1, Athletics – 4	October 17	Shibe Park	26,891
2	Cubs – 3, Athletics – 9	October 18	Shibe Park	24,597
3	Athletics – 12, Cubs – 5	October 20	West Side Park	26,210
4	Athletics – 3, Cubs – 4 (10 innings)	October 22	West Side Park	19,150
5	Athletics – 7, Cubs – 2	October 23	West Side Park	27,374
