= Allen Russell =

American baseball player (1893–1972)

Allan Russell
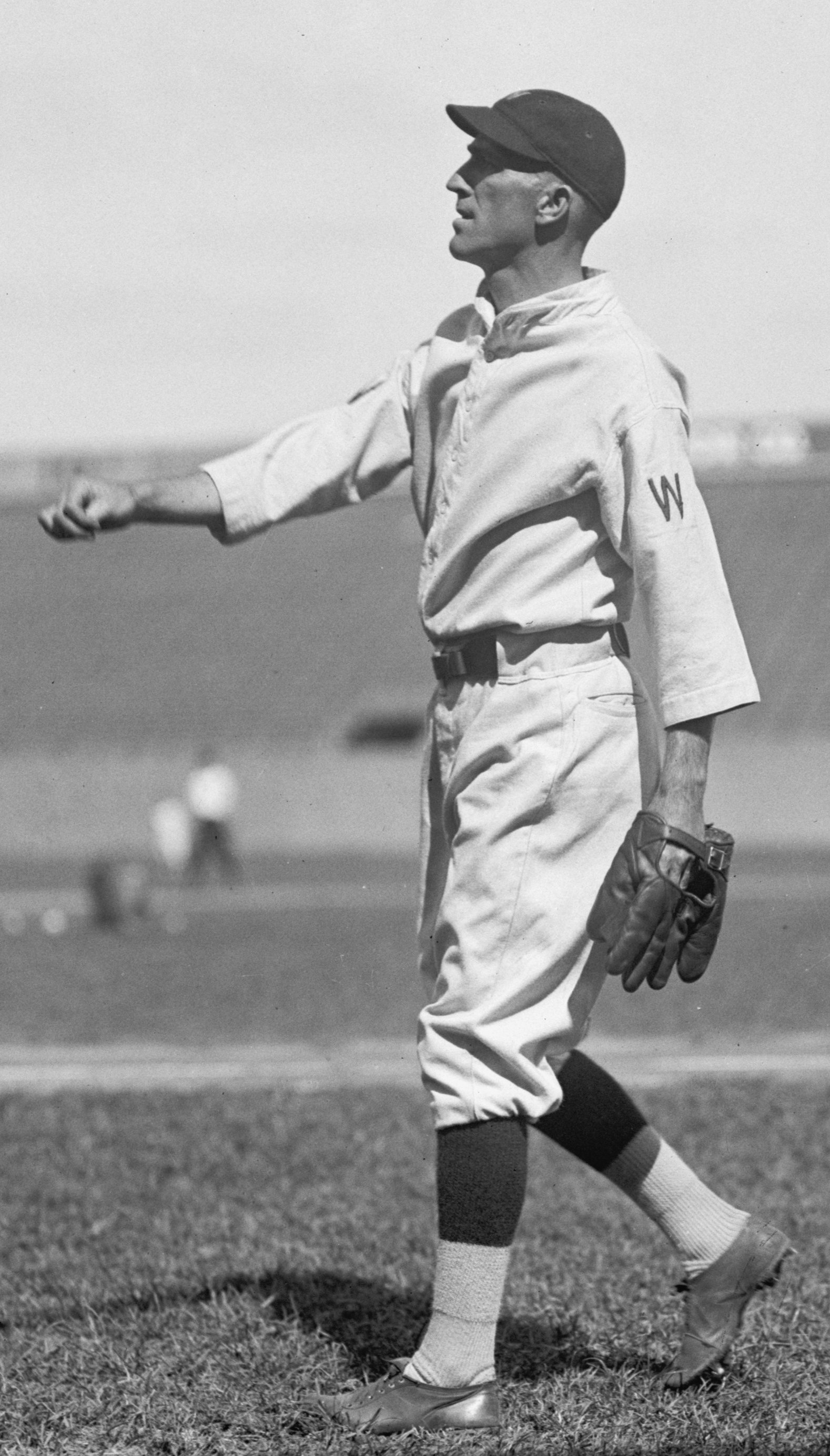
- Russell in 1924
- Pitcher
- Born: July 31, 1893; Baltimore, Maryland, U.S.
- Died: October 20, 1972 (aged 79); Baltimore, Maryland, U.S.
- Batted: Both Threw: Right

MLB debut
- September 13, 1915, for the New York Yankees

Last MLB appearance
- September 19, 1925, for the Washington Senators

MLB statistics
- Win–loss record: 71–76
- Earned run average: 3.52
- Strikeouts: 603
- Stats at Baseball Reference

Teams
- New York Yankees (1915–1919); Boston Red Sox (1919–1922); Washington Senators (1923–1925)

Career highlights and awards
- World Series champion (1924)

Allan E. "Rubberarm" Russell (July 31, 1893 – October 20, 1972) was an American professional baseball player. He was a right-handed pitcher over parts of 11 seasons (1915–1925) with the New York Yankees, Boston Red Sox and Washington Senators. For his career, he compiled a 71–76 record in 345 appearances, with a 3.52 earned run average and 603 strikeouts. Russell played on the 1924 World Series champion Senators, making one appearance in the World Series, giving up one run over three innings of work.

He was a spitball pitcher who was allowed to throw the pitch after it was banned following the 1920 season. He was one of 17 pitchers exempt from the rule change.

Russell died on October 20, 1972 at the age of 79 in Baltimore, Maryland. His brother Lefty Russell also played Major League Baseball.

== See also ==
- List of Major League Baseball annual saves leaders
