= Heinie Heitmuller =

American baseball player (1883-1912)

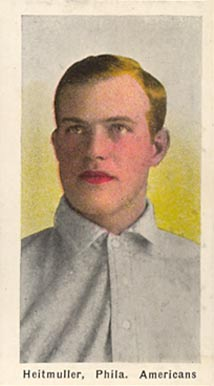
- Outfielder
- Born: May 25, 1883; San Francisco, California, U.S.
- Died: October 8, 1912 (aged 29); Los Angeles, California, U.S.
- Batted: Right Threw: Right

MLB debut
- April 26, 1909, for the Philadelphia Athletics

Last MLB appearance
- July 23, 1910, for the Philadelphia Athletics

MLB statistics
- Batting average: .271
- Home runs: 0
- Runs batted in: 22
- Stats at Baseball Reference

Teams
- Philadelphia Athletics (1909–1910)

Career highlights and awards
- World Series Champion: 1910

William Frederick "Heinie" Heitmuller (May 25, 1883 – October 8, 1912) was an American left fielder in Major League Baseball. He was born in San Francisco, California, and died at age 29 in Los Angeles. He was buried at Olivet Memorial Park in Colma, California.

== Playing career ==
After attending the University of California, Berkeley, Heitmuller played for several years in the Pacific Coast League. He then spent part of two seasons in the outfield for the Philadelphia Athletics. In 1909, he played in 64 games and hit well. However, his averages dropped in 1910, and he lost the left field job to Topsy Hartsel. Overall, Heitmuller played in 95 major league games, 89 as an outfielder and 69 in left field. He had a career batting average of .271 with a .368 on-base percentage.

After being released by the Athletics in July, Heitmuller played in the Eastern League and then returned to the Pacific Coast League (PCL). He played for the Los Angeles Angels in 1911, compiling a .343 batting average and .463 slugging percentage.

In 1912, Heitmuller was playing with the Los Angeles Angels as they competed for the PCL pennant. He was the PCL's leading hitter with a .335 batting average, a .471 slugging percentage and a career-high 15 home runs when he contracted typhoid fever late in the 1912 season. He died from the illness in October 1912.
