= Lefty Russell =

American baseball player (1890-1962)

- Pitcher
- Born: July 8, 1890; Baltimore, Maryland, U.S.
- Died: January 22, 1962 (aged 71); Baltimore, Maryland, U.S.
- Batted: Left Threw: Left

MLB debut
- October 1, 1910, for the Philadelphia Athletics

Last MLB appearance
- May 28, 1912, for the Philadelphia Athletics

MLB statistics
- Win–loss record: 1-5
- Strikeouts: 21
- Earned run average: 6.36
- Stats at Baseball Reference

Teams
- Philadelphia Athletics (1910–1912)

Career highlights and awards
- 2x World Series Champion: 1910, 1911

Clarence Dickson "Lefty" Russell (July 8, 1890 – January 22, 1962) was an American professional baseball player who played three seasons for the Philadelphia Athletics from 1910 through 1912. He was on Athletics teams that won two World Series in 1910 and 1911, although according to the 1912 Reach guide he was "no use at all, owing to a bad arm" in 1911. He was born in Baltimore, Maryland and died there at the age of 71. His brother Allen Russell also played Major League Baseball.
