= Connie Mack =

American baseball manager and owner (1862–1956)

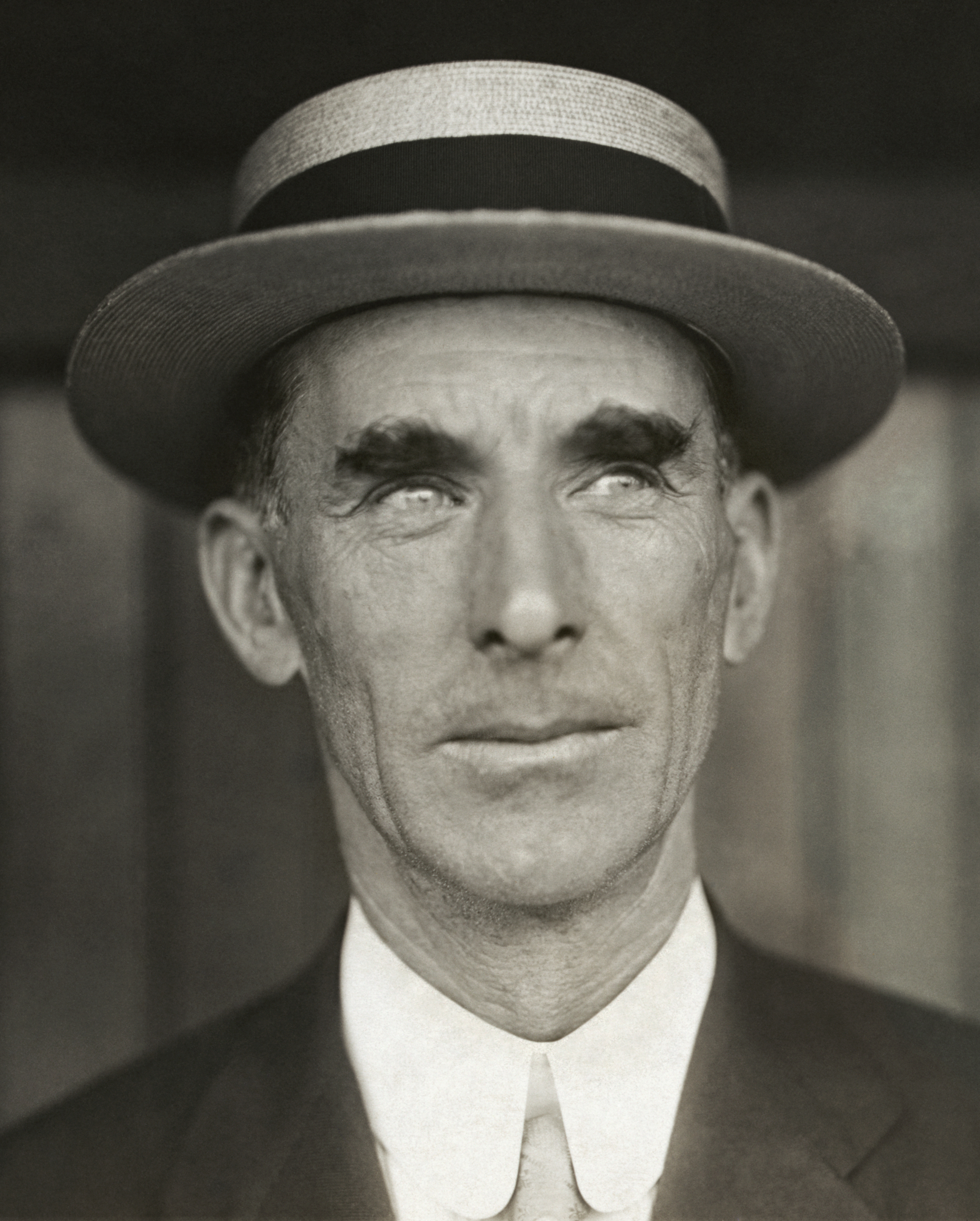
- Mack in 1911
- Catcher / Manager / Owner
- Born: December 22, 1862; East Brookfield, Massachusetts, U.S.
- Died: February 8, 1956 (aged 93); Philadelphia, Pennsylvania, U.S.
- Batted: Right Threw: Right

MLB debut
- September 11, 1886, for the Washington Nationals

Last MLB appearance
- August 29, 1896, for the Pittsburgh Pirates

MLB statistics
- Batting average: .244
- Home runs: 5
- Runs batted in: 265
- Games managed: 7,755
- Managerial record: 3,731–3,948–76
- Winning %: .486
- Stats at Baseball Reference
- Managerial record at Baseball Reference

Teams
- As player: Washington Nationals (1886–1889); Buffalo Bisons (1890); Pittsburgh Pirates (1891–1896); As manager: Pittsburgh Pirates (1894–1896); Philadelphia Athletics (1901–1950)

Career highlights and awards
- 5× World Series champion (1910, 1911, 1913, 1929, 1930); Most managerial wins, losses, games, and seasons managed in MLB history; Philadelphia Baseball Wall of Fame; Athletics Hall of Fame

Member of the National

Baseball Hall of Fame
- Induction: 1937
- Election method: Centennial Commission

Cornelius McGillicuddy (December 22, 1862 – February 8, 1956), better known as Connie Mack, was an American professional baseball catcher, manager, and team owner. Mack holds records for the most wins (3,731), losses (3,948), ties (76), and games managed (7,755) in Major League Baseball (MLB) history. His victory total is 847 more than the second-highest: Tony La Russa's 2,884 wins. Mack's lead in career losses is even greater, with 1,449 more than La Russa's 2,499. Mack also has 17 more ties than the next-closest manager, Clark Griffith, who has 59.

Mack managed the Philadelphia Athletics for its first 50 seasons of play, starting in 1901; was at least part-owner from 1901 to 1954; and retired after the 1950 season at age 87. He was the first American League manager to lead a team to 100 wins, doing so in 1910, 1911, 1929, 1930, and 1931; his five 100-win seasons are second-most in MLB history, with only two other managers surpassing him. He was the first manager to win the World Series three times, and he is the only manager to win consecutive Series on two occasions (1910–11, 1929–30); his five Series titles remain the third-most by any manager, and his nine American League pennants rank second in league history. However, constant financial struggles forced repeated rebuilding of the roster, and Mack's teams also finished in last place 17 times, including ten seasons in which the Athletics lost 100 games.

Mack was elected to the National Baseball Hall of Fame in 1937.

== Early life and education ==
Mack was born Cornelius McGillicuddy on December 22, 1862, in Brookfield, Massachusetts, in what is now East Brookfield. His parents, Michael McGillicuddy and Mary McKillop, were immigrants from Ireland: Michael from Killarney in County Kerry, and Mary from the Catholic section of Belfast. A wheelwright by trade, Michael served with the 51st Massachusetts Volunteer Infantry Regiment during the American Civil War. He suffered from several ailments as the result of his military service; after the war, he was able to work only infrequently and drew a disability pension.

As with many Irish immigrants whose names began with "Mc", the McGillicuddys were often referred to as "Mack", except in official and legal documents. Michael’s father was named Cornelius McGillicuddy, and by tradition, the family named at least one son in each generation Cornelius. "Connie" is a common nickname for Cornelius, so Cornelius McGillicuddy was called "Connie Mack" from an early age. He did not have a middle name, but many accounts erroneously give him the middle name "Alexander"; this error probably arose because his son Cornelius McGillicuddy Jr. took Alexander as his confirmation name. Connie Mack never legally changed his name; on the occasion of his second marriage at age 48, he signed the wedding register as "Cornelius McGillicuddy". His nickname on the baseball field was "Slats", for his height of 6 feet 2 inches and thin build.

Mack was educated in East Brookfield, and began working summers in local cotton mills at age 9 to help support his family. He quit school after completing the eighth grade at age 14, intending to work full-time to contribute to the family's support, as several of his siblings had done. He clerked at a store, worked on local farms, and worked on the production lines of the shoe factories in nearby towns.

Mack was also a good athlete and frequently played baseball and some of its predecessor games with local players in East Brookfield. In 1879 his skills landed him a place on East Brookfield's town team, which played other town teams in the area. Though younger than his teammates by several years, Mack was the team's catcher and de facto captain.

== Professional career ==
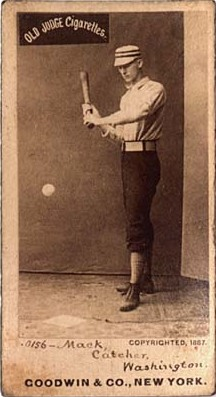
Connie Mack's 1887 baseball card

Beginning in 1886, Mack played 10 seasons in the National League and one in the Players' League, for a total of 11 seasons in the Major Leagues, mainly as a catcher.

=== Minor leagues ===
Beginning in 1884, he played on minor league teams in the Connecticut cities of Meriden and Hartford.

=== Washington Nationals (1886–1889) ===
Mack was sold to the Washington Nationals (sometimes called the Statesmen or the Senators) of the National League in 1886.

=== Buffalo Bisons (1890) ===
In the winter of 1889, he jumped to the Buffalo Bisons of the new Players' League, investing his entire life savings of $500 in shares in the club. But the Players' League went out of business after only a year, and Mack lost his job and his whole investment.

=== Pittsburgh Pirates (1891–1896) ===
In December 1890 Mack signed a contract with the Pittsburgh Pirates of the National League and remained with them for the rest of his career as a full-time player.

As a player, Mack was "a light-hitting catcher with a reputation as a smart player, but didn't do anything particularly well as a player."

Mack was one of the first catchers to position himself directly behind home plate instead of in front of the backstop. According to Wilbert Robinson, "Mack never was mean ... [but] if you had any soft spot, Connie would find it. He could do and say things that got more under your skin than the cuss words used by other catchers."

In addition to verbally needling batters to distract them, he developed skills such as blocking the plate to prevent base runners from scoring and faking the sound of a foul tip. (He was probably responsible for the 1891 rule change requiring that a batter must have two strikes against him in order to be called out if the catcher caught a foul tip.) Besides tipping bats to fake the sound of a foul tip, Mack became adept at tipping bats to throw off the hitter's swing. ("Tipping" a bat is to brush it with the catcher's mitt as the batter swings, either delaying the swing or putting it off course, so that the batter misses the ball or does not hit it solidly. If the umpire is aware that a bat has been tipped, whether intentionally or unintentionally, he calls catcher's interference.) Mack never denied such tricks:

Farmer Weaver was a catcher-outfielder for Louisville. I tipped his bat several times when he had two strikes on him one year, and each time the umpire called him out. He got even, though. One time there were two strikes on him and he swung as the pitch was coming in. But he didn't swing at the ball. He swung right at my wrists. Sometimes I think I can still feel the pain. I'll tell you I didn't tip his bat again. No, sir, not until the last game of the season and Weaver was at bat for the last time. When he had two strikes, I tipped his bat again and got away with it.

== Managerial career ==
=== Pittsburgh Pirates (1894–1896) ===
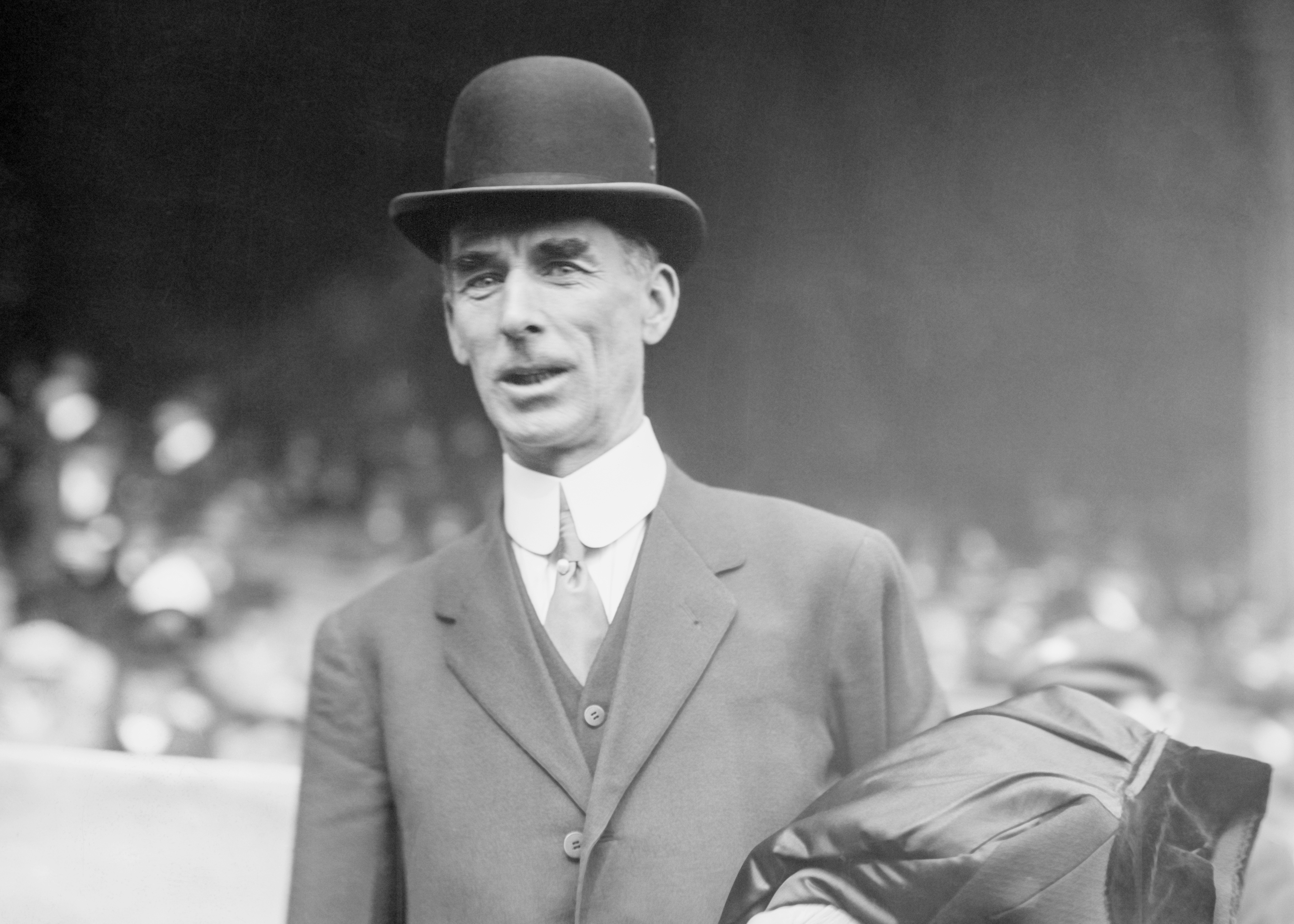
Connie Mack in 1911

Mack's last three seasons in the National League were as a player-manager with the Pittsburgh Pirates from 1894 to 1896, with a 149–134 (.527) record. Mack was fired on September 21, 1896, retiring as a full-time player.

=== Minor leagues ===
Mack accepted a deal from Henry Killilea to act as manager and occasional backup catcher for the minor league Milwaukee Brewers (the modern-day Baltimore Orioles). He agreed to a salary of $3,000 (equivalent to $120,000 in 2025) and 25% of the club. He managed the Brewers for four seasons from 1897 to 1900, their best year coming in 1900, when they finished second, behind the Chicago White Stockings. It was in Milwaukee that he first signed pitcher Rube Waddell, who would follow him to the big leagues.

=== Philadelphia Athletics (1901–1950) ===
On November 8 1900, Mack became manager of the new American League's then unnamed Philadelphia ballclub, which eventually became known as the Athletics. Shortly after, he would be named treasurer and part owner of that said franchise.

Mack managed the Athletics through the 1950 season, compiling a record of 3,582–3,814 (.484) when he retired at 87. Mack won nine pennants and appeared in eight World Series, winning five.

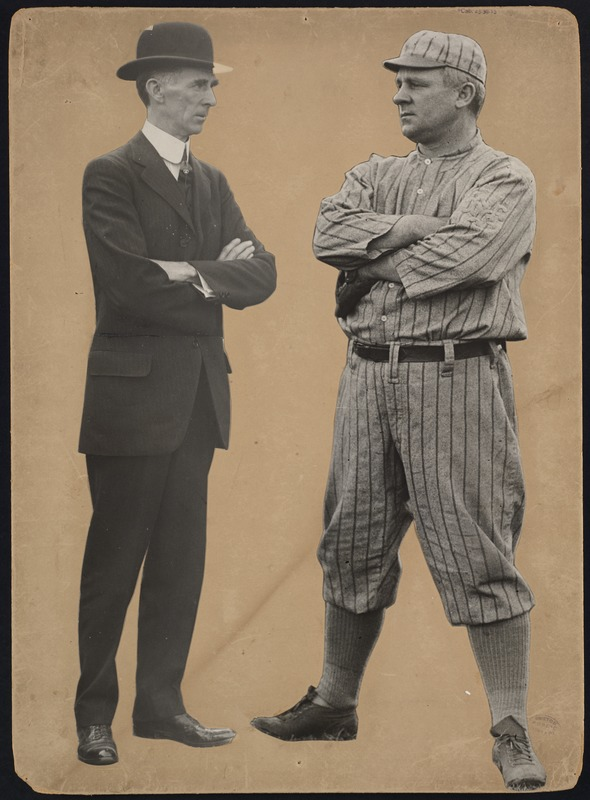
Connie Mack and John McGraw, [ca. 1913]. Michael T. "Nuf Ced" McGreevy Collection, Boston Public Library

Mack's 50-year tenure as Athletics manager is the most ever for a coach or manager with the same team in North American professional sports, and has never been seriously threatened. A few college coaches had longer tenures: John Gagliardi was a head football coach from 1949 to 2012, ending with 60 seasons at Saint John's of Minnesota; Eddie Robinson was head football coach at Grambling State for 57 seasons, from 1941 (when it was known as the Louisiana Negro Normal and Industrial Institute) to 1997; Herb Magee served as head men's basketball coach of the institution now known as Jefferson for 54 years from 1967 to 2022 (the school canceled the 2020-21 season due to COVID-19 concerns). Joe Paterno, with 62 seasons as a college football coach for the Penn State Nittany Lions also surpassed Mack, although Paterno was head coach in only 46 of those years. College football pioneer Amos Alonzo Stagg also surpassed Mack in overall tenure, though not in tenure for a single employer; he was a head coach for 55 seasons in all (1892–1946), with the first 41 at Chicago (1892–1932).

Mack was widely praised in the newspapers for his intelligent and innovative managing, which earned him the nickname "the Tall Tactician". He valued intelligence and "baseball smarts," always looking for educated players. (He traded away Shoeless Joe Jackson despite his talent because of his bad attitude and unintelligent play.) "Better than any other manager, Mack understood and promoted intelligence as an element of excellence." He wanted men who were self-directed, self-disciplined and self-motivated; his ideal player was Eddie Collins. According to baseball historian Bill James, Mack was well ahead of his time in having numerous college players on his teams. Several of his players went on to become well-respected college coaches. Jack Coombs, the ace of Mack's 1910–11 champions, became the longtime coach at Duke. Andy Coakley, who won 20 games for Mack's 1905 pennant winners, coached for over 30 years at Columbia, where he was the college coach for Lou Gehrig. Dick Siebert, longtime coach at Minnesota, played for Mack from 1938 to 1945. James believed that Mack's influence on the game, as great as it was, would have been even greater had the college game been more popular during the 1920s and 1930s, when Mack was at his peak.

According to James, Mack looked for seven things in his players—"physical ability, intelligence, courage, disposition, will power, general alertness and personal habits."

As a result of Mack's striving to have his players become better people as well as baseball players, he created a Code of Conduct following the 1916 season:

- I will always play the game to the best of my ability.
- I will always play to win, but if I lose, I will not look for an excuse to detract from my opponent's victory.
- I will never take an unfair advantage in order to win.
- I will always abide by the rules of the game—on the diamond as well as in my daily life.
- I will always conduct myself as a true sportsman—on and off the playing field.
- I will always strive for the good of the entire team rather than for my own glory.
- I will never gloat in victory or pity myself in defeat.
- I will do my utmost to keep myself clean—physically, mentally, and morally.
- I will always judge a teammate or an opponent as an individual and never on the basis of race or religion.

He also looked for players with quiet and disciplined personal lives, having seen many players in his playing days destroy themselves and their teams through heavy drinking. Mack himself never drank; before the 1910 World Series he asked all his players to "take the pledge" not to drink during the Series. When Topsy Hartsel told Mack he needed a drink the night before the final game, Mack told him to do what he thought best, but in these circumstances "if it was me, I'd die before I took a drink."

In any event, his managerial style was not tyrannical but easygoing. He never imposed curfews or bed checks, and made the best of what he had. Rube Waddell was the best pitcher and biggest gate attraction of Mack's first decade as the A's manager, so he put up with his drinking and general unreliability for years, until it began to bring the team down and the other players asked Mack to get rid of Waddell.

Unlike most other baseball managers, Mack chose to wear a business suit and overcoat in the dugout rather than a team uniform.

Mack's strength as a manager was finding the best players, teaching them well and letting them play. "He did not believe that baseball revolved around managerial strategy." He was "one of the first managers to work on repositioning his fielders" during the game, often directing the outfielders to move left or right, play shallow or deep, by waving his rolled-up scorecard from the bench. After he became well known for doing this, he often passed his instructions to the fielders by way of other players, and simply waved his scorecard as a feint.

James summed up Mack's managerial approach as follows: he favored a set lineup, did not generally platoon hitters; preferred young players to veterans and power hitters to those with high batting averages; did not often pinch-hit, use his bench players or sacrifice much (even so, the A's led the league in sacrifice bunts in 1909, 1911 and 1914); believed in "big-inning" offense rather than small ball; and very rarely issued an intentional walk.

Over the course of his career, he had nine pennant-winning teams spanning three peak periods or "dynasties." His original team, with players such as Rube Waddell, Ossee Schrecongost, and Eddie Plank, won the pennant in 1902 (when there was no World Series) and 1905. They lost the 1905 World Series to the New York Giants (four games to one, all shutouts, with Christy Mathewson hurling three shutouts for a record 27 scoreless innings in one World Series). During that season, Giants manager John McGraw said that Mack had "a big white elephant on his hands" with the Athletics. Mack defiantly adopted the white elephant as the team's logo, which the Athletics still use today.

As that first team aged, Mack acquired a core of young players to form his second great team, which featured Mack's famous "$100,000 infield" of Eddie Collins, Home Run Baker, Jack Barry and Stuffy McInnis. These Athletics, captained by catcher Ira Thomas, won the pennant in 1910, 1911, 1913 and 1914, beating the Cubs in the World Series in 1910 and the Giants in 1911 and 1913, but losing in 1914 in four straight games to the "Miracle" Boston Braves, who had come from last place in late July to win the National League pennant by 6 1/2 games over the Giants.

That team was dispersed due to financial problems, from which Mack did not recover until the 20s, when he built his third great team. The 1927 Athletics featured several future Hall of Fame players including veterans Ty Cobb, Zack Wheat and Eddie Collins as well as young stars like Mickey Cochrane, Lefty Grove, Al Simmons and rookie Jimmie Foxx. That team won the pennant in 1929, 1930 and 1931, beating the Chicago Cubs in the 1929 World Series (when they came from 8–0 behind in Game 4, plating a Series record ten runs in the seventh inning and winning the game, 10–8, and then from two runs down in the bottom of the ninth in Game 5 for a walk-off Series win) and easily defeating the St. Louis Cardinals in 1930. The following year, St. Louis beat the A's in seven games led by Pepper Martin.

That team was dispersed after 1932 when Mack ran into financial difficulty again. By 1934, the A's had fallen into the second division. Although Mack intended to rebuild for a third time, he would never win another pennant. The Athletics' record from 1935 to 1946 was dismal, finishing in the basement of the AL every year except a 5th-place finish in 1944. World War II brought further hardship due to personnel shortages.

In 1938, Mack in his middle seventies successfully battled a blood infection caused when a batted ball injured one of his shinbones. He stopped for treatment at the Medical and Surgical Hospital in San Antonio, Texas, where he was in passage on a train.

In addition, as Mack entered his 80s, his once-keen mind began fading rapidly. Mack would make strange decisions (which his coaches and players usually overruled), make inexplicable outbursts, and call for players from decades earlier to pinch-hit. He spent most games asleep in the dugout, leaving his coaches to run the team most of the time.

According to outfielder Sam Chapman, "He could remember the old-timers, but he had a hard time remembering the names of the current players." Shortstop Eddie Joost said "He wasn't senile, but there were lapses." Despite growing speculation he would step down, Mack brushed it all off and stated simply that he would keep managing as long as he was physically able to do so.

According to Bill James, by the time Mack recovered again financially, he was "old and out of touch with the game, so his career ends with eighteen years of miserable baseball." It was generally agreed that he stayed in the game too long, hurting his legacy. He was unable to handle the post-World War II changes in baseball, including the growing commercialization of the game. His business style was no longer viable in post-World War II America due to various factors, including the increased expense of running a team. For instance, he never installed a telephone line between the bullpen and dugout.

Despite the circumstances, the octogenarian Mack led the team to three winning seasons in 1947–1949 (including a fourth-place finish in 1948). With the A's unexpected resurgence in 1947–1949, there was hope that 1950—Mack's 50th anniversary as the A's manager—would bring a pennant at last. However, the A's never recovered from a dreadful May in which they only won five games. By May 26, the A's were 11–21, 12 games out of first, and it was obvious the season was a lost cause. On that date, his sons Earle, Roy and Connie, Jr. persuaded their father to promote Jimmy Dykes, who had been a coach since 1949, to assistant manager for the remainder of the season. Dykes became the team's main operator in the dugout, and would take over the managerial reins in his own right in 1951. At the same time, Cochrane was named general manager—thus stripping Connie, Sr. of his remaining authority. Six weeks after his mid-season retirement, Mack was honored by baseball when he threw out the ceremonial first pitch of the 1950 All-Star Game.

Red Smith wrote about his managerial style at the end of his career:

Toward the end he was old and sick and saddened, a figure of forlorn dignity bewildered by the bickering around him as the baseball monument that he had built crumbled away.

At the time of his retirement, Mack stated:

I'm not quitting because I'm getting old, I'm quitting because I think people want me to."

=== Managerial record ===
Team	Year	Regular season						Postseason			
Team	Year	Games	Won	Lost	Tied	Win %	Finish	Won	Lost	Win %	Result
PIT	1894	23	12	10	1	.545	7th in NL	–	–	–	
PIT	1895	135	71	61	3	.538	7th in NL	–	–	–	
PIT	1896	131	66	63	2	.512	6th in NL	–	–	–	
PIT total		289	149	134	6	.527		–	–	–	
PHA	1901	137	74	62	1	.544	4th in AL	-	-	-	
PHA	1902	137	83	53	1	.565	1st in AL	–	–	–	Won AL Pennant
PHA	1903	137	75	60	2	.556	2nd in AL	–	–	–	
PHA	1904	155	81	70	4	.414	5th in AL	–	–	–	
PHA	1905	152	92	56	4	.622	1st in AL	1	4	.200	Lost World Series (NYG)
PHA	1906	149	78	67	4	.538	4th in AL	–	–	–	
PHA	1907	150	88	57	2	.607	2nd in AL	–	–	–	
PHA	1908	157	68	85	4	.444	6th in AL	–	–	–	
PHA	1909	157	95	58	0	.621	2nd in AL	–	–	–	
PHA	1910	155	102	48	5	.680	1st in AL	4	1	.800	Won World Series (CHC)
PHA	1911	152	101	50	1	.669	1st in AL	4	2	.667	Won World Series (NYG)
PHA	1912	153	90	62	1	.592	3rd in AL	–	–	–	
PHA	1913	153	96	57	0	.627	1st in AL	4	1	.800	Won World Series (NYG)
PHA	1914	158	99	53	6	.622	1st in AL	0	4	.200	Lost World Series (BOB)
PHA	1915	154	43	109	2	.283	8th in AL	–	–	–	
PHA	1916	154	36	117	1	.235	8th in AL	–	–	–	
PHA	1917	154	55	98	1	.359	8th in AL	–	–	–	
PHA	1918	130	52	76	2	.406	8th in AL	–	–	–	
PHA	1919	140	36	104	0	.257	8th in AL	–	–	–	
PHA	1920	156	48	106	2	.312	8th in AL	–	–	–	
PHA	1921	155	53	100	2	.346	8th in AL	–	–	–	
PHA	1922	155	65	89	1	.422	7th in AL	–	–	–	
PHA	1923	153	69	83	1	.422	6th in AL	–	–	–	
PHA	1924	152	71	81	0	.467	5th in AL	–	–	–	
PHA	1925	153	88	64	1	.579	2nd in AL	–	–	–	
PHA	1926	150	83	67	0	.553	3rd in AL	–	–	–	
PHA	1927	155	91	63	1	.591	2nd in AL	–	–	–	
PHA	1928	153	98	55	0	.641	2nd in AL	–	–	–	
PHA	1929	151	104	46	1	.693	1st in AL	4	1	.800	Won World Series (CHC)
PHA	1930	154	102	52	0	.662	1st in AL	4	2	.667	Won World Series (STL)
PHA	1931	153	107	45	1	.704	1st in AL	3	4	.429	Lost World Series (STL)
PHA	1932	154	94	60	0	.610	2nd in AL	–	–	–	
PHA	1933	152	79	72	1	.523	3rd in AL	–	–	–	
PHA	1934	153	68	82	3	.453	5th in AL	–	–	–	
PHA	1935	149	58	91	0	.389	8th in AL	–	–	–	
PHA	1936	154	53	100	1	.346	8th in AL	–	–	–	
PHA	1937	120	39	80	1	.328	7th in AL	–	–	–	
PHA	1938	154	53	99	2	.349	8th in AL	–	–	–	
PHA	1939	62	25	37	0	.403	7th in AL	–	–	–	
PHA	1940	154	54	100	0	.351	8th in AL	–	–	–	
PHA	1941	154	64	90	0	.416	8th in AL	–	–	–	
PHA	1942	154	55	99	0	.357	8th in AL	–	–	–	
PHA	1943	155	49	105	1	.318	8th in AL	–	–	–	
PHA	1944	155	72	82	1	.468	5th in AL	–	–	–	
PHA	1945	153	52	98	3	.347	8th in AL	–	–	–	
PHA	1946	155	49	105	1	.318	8th in AL	–	–	–	
PHA	1947	156	78	76	2	.506	5th in AL	–	–	–	
PHA	1948	154	84	70	0	.545	4th in AL	–	–	–	
PHA	1949	154	81	73	0	.526	5th in AL	–	–	–	
PHA	1950	154	52	102	0	.338	8th in AL	–	–	–	
PHA total		7,466	3,582	3,814	70	.484		24	19	.558	
Total		7,755	3,731	3,948	76	.486		24	19	.558	

=== Owner ===
The American League's white knight, Charles Somers, provided the seed money to start the Athletics and several other American League teams. However, plans called for local interests to buy out Somers as soon as possible. To that end, Mack persuaded sporting goods manufacturer Ben Shibe, a minority owner of the rival Philadelphia Phillies, to buy a 50 percent stake in the team—an offer sweetened by Mack's promise that Shibe would have the exclusive right to make baseballs for the American League. In return, Mack was allowed to buy a 25 percent stake, and was named secretary and treasurer of the team. Two local sports writers, Frank Hough and Sam Jones, bought the remaining 25 percent, but their involvement was not mentioned in the incorporating papers; in fact, no agreement was put on paper until 1902. Mack and Shibe did business on a handshake.

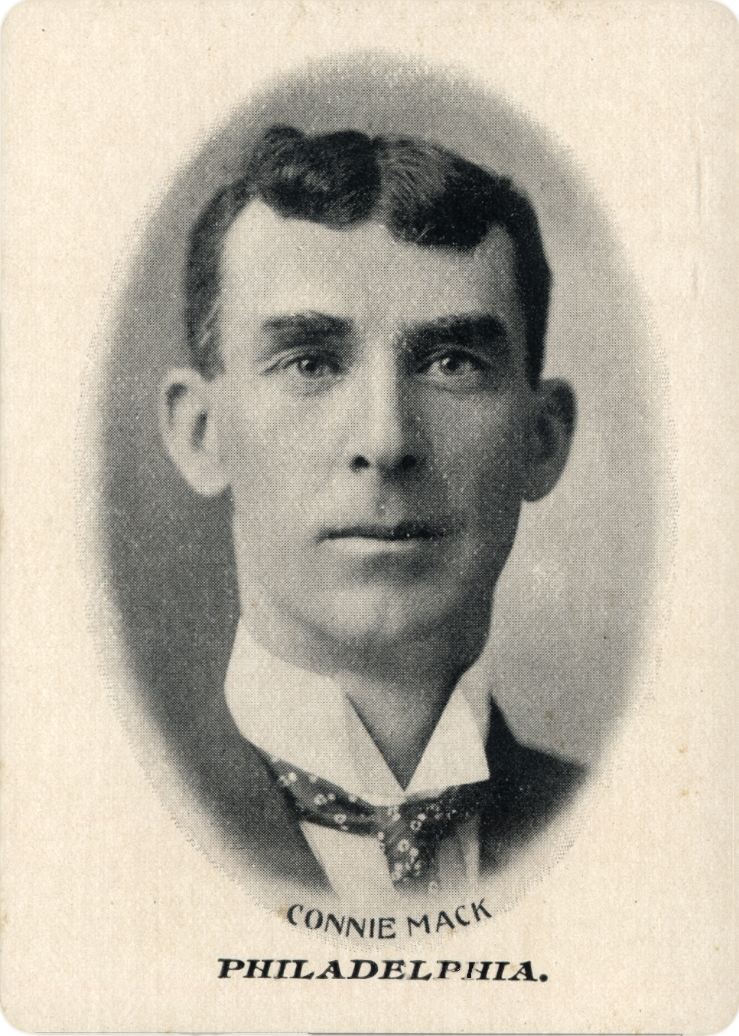
A 1904 Connie Mack card

In 1913, Hough and Jones sold their 25 percent to Mack, making him a full partner in the club with Shibe; Mack actually borrowed the money for the purchase from Shibe. Under their agreement, Mack had full control over baseball matters while Shibe handled the business side. However, Mack had enjoyed more or less a free hand over the baseball side since the team's inception. When Shibe died in 1922, his sons Tom and John took over management of the business side, with Tom as team president and John as vice president. Tom died in 1936, and John resigned shortly thereafter, leaving Mack to take over the presidency. John Shibe died in 1937, and Mack bought 141 shares from his estate, enough to make him majority owner of the A's. However, he had been operating head of the franchise since Ben Shibe's death. Such an arrangement is no longer possible in current times, as major-league rules do not allow a coach or manager to own any financial interest in a club.

Mack had a large network of baseball friends, all of whom acted as scouts and "bird-dogs" for him, finding talented players and alerting Mack; "Mack was better at that game than anybody else in the world. People liked Mack, respected him, and trusted him. ... Mack answered every letter and listened patiently to every sales job, and ... he got players for that reason."

Mack saw baseball as a business, and recognized that economic necessity drove the game. He explained to his cousin, Art Dempsey, that "The best thing for a team financially is to be in the running and finish second. If you win, the players all expect raises." This was one reason he was constantly collecting players, signing almost anyone to a ten-day contract to assess his talent; he was looking ahead to future seasons when his veterans would either retire or hold out for bigger salaries than Mack could give them.

Unlike most baseball owners, Mack had almost no income apart from the A's. Even when he collected rent from the Phillies, he was often in financial difficulties. Money problems—the escalation of his best players' salaries (due both to their success and to competition from a new, well-financed third major league of the Federal League in 1914–1915), combined with a steep drop in attendance due to World War I—led to the gradual dispersal of his second championship team, the 1910–1914 team, whom he sold, traded, or released over the years 1915–1917. The war hurt the team badly, leaving Mack without the resources to sign valuable players. His 1916 team, with a 36–117 record, is often considered the worst team in American League history, and its .235 winning percentage is still the lowest ever for a modern-era (since 1900) major league team. The team's 117 losses set a modern-era record and at the time were the second most losses behind the Cleveland Spiders' 130 in 1899. As of 2024 that record has been topped only three times, all by teams that played 162-game schedules, not 154 like the Athletics: the 1962 New York Mets (120 losses in their inaugural season), the 2003 Detroit Tigers (119 losses), and the 2024 Chicago White Sox (121 losses). All told, the A's finished dead last in the AL seven consecutive seasons (1915 to 1921), and would not reach .500 again until 1925. The rebuilt team won back-to-back championships in 1929–1930 over the Cubs and Cardinals, and then lost a rematch with the latter in 1931. As it turned out, these were the last postseason appearances for the A's not only in Philadelphia, but for another four decades. Unlike with the breakup of his second great team, the A's did not tumble out of contention right away. They remained fairly competitive for most of the first half of the 1930s. However, after 1933, they would only tally four more winning seasons during their stay in Philadelphia—which would be the franchise's only winning seasons for 35 years.

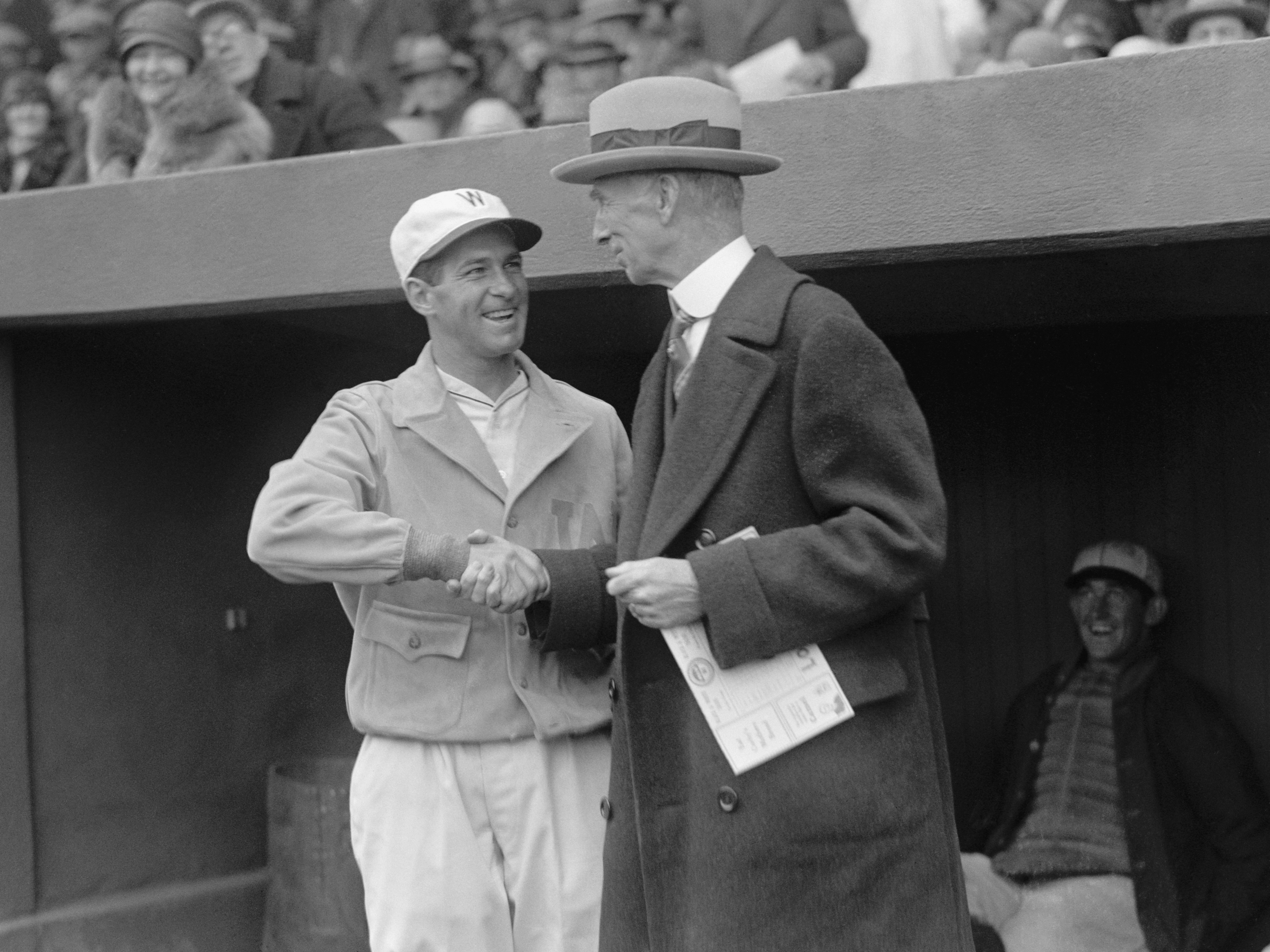
Senators' manager Bucky Harris and Mack, Opening Day, April 13, 1926, Griffith Stadium, D.C.; Senators won in the 9th, 1–0

With the 1929 onset of the Great Depression, Mack struggled financially again, and was forced to sell the best players from his second great championship team, such as Lefty Grove and Jimmie Foxx, to stay in business.

Although Mack wanted to rebuild again and win more championships, he was never able to do so owing to a lack of funds. Even before then, he either did not (or could not) invest in a farm system. Mack celebrated his 70th birthday in 1932, and many began wondering if his best days were behind him. Even as bad as the A's got during the next two decades, he stubbornly retained full control over baseball matters long after most teams had hired a general manager. This continued even after he became majority owner, despite calls both inside and outside Philadelphia to step down. Indeed, one of the few times that Mack considered giving up even some of his duties was in the 1934–35 offseason—when the A's were still not far removed from what would be their last great era. He briefly entertained replacing himself as manager with Babe Ruth, but ruled that idea out, saying that the Babe's wife, Claire, would be running the team inside of a month.

In the early 1940s, Mack gave a minority stake in the team to his three sons, Roy, Earle, and Connie, Jr. Although Roy and Earle had never gotten along with Connie, Jr., who was more than 20 years younger than them, Connie, Sr. intended to have all three of them inherit the team after his death or retirement. This strategy backfired when Roy and Earle refused to consider Connie, Jr.'s demands to end the team's bargain-basement way of doing business. One of the few things on which they agreed was that it was time for their father to step down. Connie, Jr. was only able to force through other minor improvements to the team and the rapidly crumbling Shibe Park through an alliance with the Shibe heirs. When it became apparent that his older brothers were not willing to go further, Connie, Jr. and the Shibes decided to sell the team. However, Roy and Earle countered by buying out their younger brother, persuading their father to support them. In order to pull off the deal, however, they mortgaged the team to the Connecticut General Life Insurance Company (now part of CIGNA). Yearly payments of $200,000 drained the team of badly needed capital, and ended any realistic chance of the A's winning again under the Macks' stewardship.

When Mack resigned as manager, he largely withdrew from active control of the team. Over the next five years, the team crumbled to the bottom of the American League. Although reduced to a figurehead, Mack continued to be treated with awe and reverence by players who considered him living history. His sons handled his correspondence by 1953 as he had become too frail by that point to do it himself.

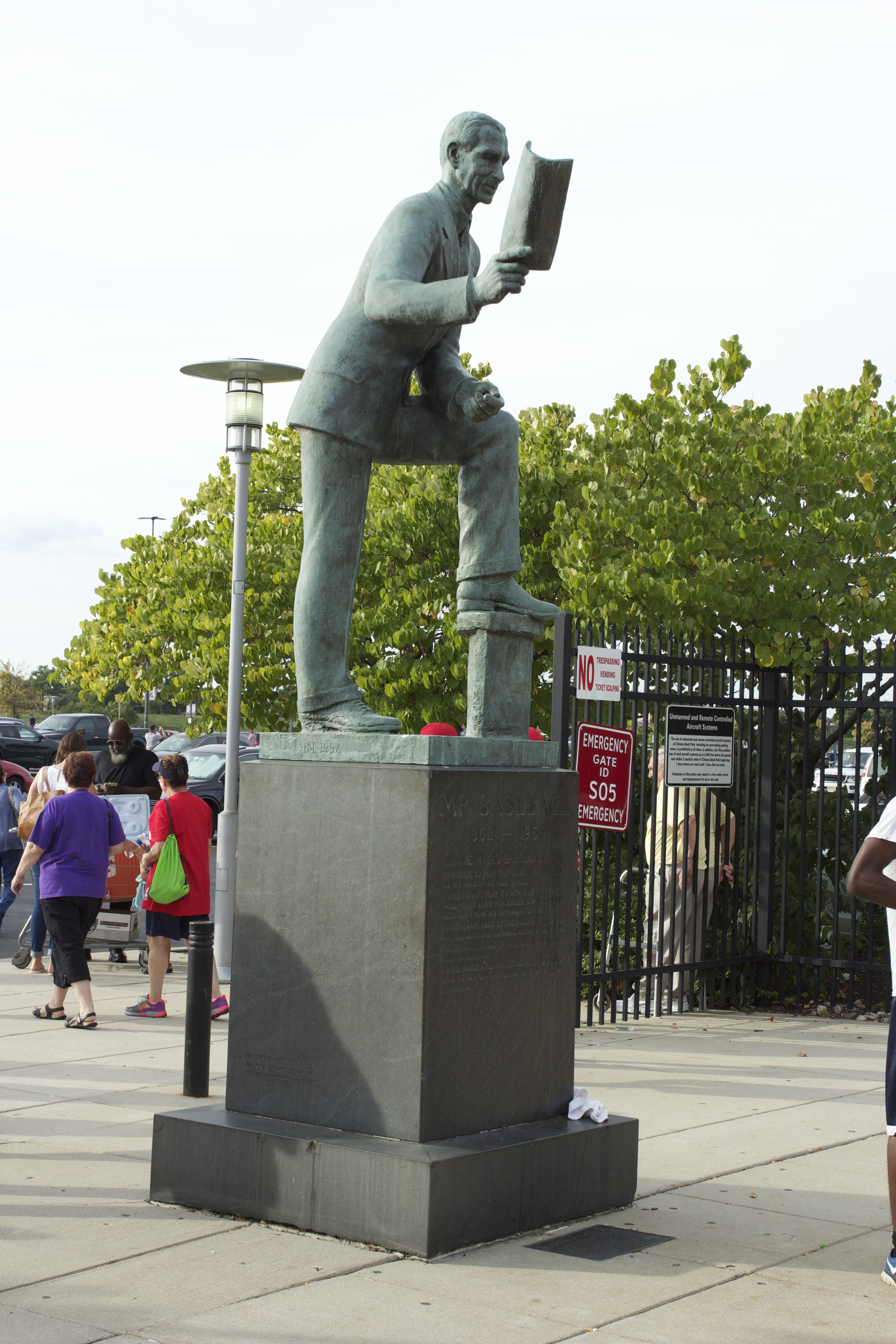
Statue of Mack in South Philadelphia

As that year ended, the A's were dangerously close to bankruptcy. The other American League owners had been concerned for some time about the situation in Philadelphia, since the crowds at Shibe Park had dwindled to the point that visiting teams could not meet their expenses for traveling there. Prior in 1951, Buffalo based businessman and Sportservice owner Louis Jacobs gave Mack a loan of $250,000.00 with no interest to keep the Athletics from having financial difficulty. The 1954 A's attracted only 304,000 people, nowhere near enough to break even. The other owners, as well as league president Will Harridge, wanted the Athletics sold off to a new owner. The Yankees in particular lobbied for it to be Chicago businessman Arnold Johnson (1906–1960), who had recently bought both Yankee Stadium as well as Blues Stadium in Kansas City, home to the Yankees' top Triple AAA farm team in the second American Association. Roy and Earle Mack did not want to move the team, but pressure from the Yankees and blowback from several bad business decisions finally moved their hand and they agreed to the sale. A final attempt to sell the A's to Philadelphia car dealer John Crisconi briefly gained Mack's support, but collapsed at the eleventh hour—reportedly due to behind-the-scenes intrigue by the Yankees. When that deal collapsed, a bitter Mack wrote a letter blasting his fellow owners for sinking the Crisconi deal. However, he admitted that he did not have nearly enough money to run the A's in 1955, and conceded that the Johnson deal was the only one with a chance of approval.

In early November, Mack agreed to sell the A's to Johnson for $1.5 million. The aforementioned Louis Jacobs helped broker the deal between the Mack family and Johnson. When the American League owners met in New York to discuss the sale to Johnson, they voted 5–3 to approve the sale. Johnson immediately requested permission to move to Kansas City, which was granted after Detroit's Spike Briggs switched his vote. Although Mack had long since conceded that his 55 years in the American League were over, his doctor reported that the nonagenarian owner suffered a sudden sharp drop in blood pressure and almost expired upon learning that his team was gone.

The A's sold Shibe Park, now renamed Connie Mack Stadium, to the Phillies. Mack was still chauffeured around to games by his caretaker. He attended the 1954 World Series and the occasional regular season game, but in October 1955, he fell and suffered a hip fracture. Mack underwent surgery on October 5, missing the World Series that week for the first time ever. He required the use of a wheelchair after that point, celebrating his 93rd birthday in November. His death came at his daughter's house on the afternoon of February 8, 1956. According to his doctor, he'd been fine until the 7th when he "just started to fade away". Officially, it was announced that he died of "old age and complications from his hip surgery" Mack's funeral was held in his parish church, St. Bridget's, and he was buried in Holy Sepulchre Cemetery in Cheltenham Township just outside Philadelphia, with Commissioner of Baseball Ford Frick, the AL and NL presidents, and all 16 MLB owners serving as pallbearers.

== Personality ==
Mack was quiet, even-tempered, and gentlemanly, never using profanity. He was generally addressed as "Mr. Mack". He always called his players by their given names. Chief Bender, for instance, was "Albert" to Mack. Perhaps due to his great longevity in the game, he appeared to have a kind of saintly image; his long-time friends objected to the image of him as "the bloodless saint so often painted, a sanctimonious old Puritan patting babies". His friend Red Smith called him "tough and warm and wonderful, kind and stubborn and courtly and unreasonable and generous and calculating and naive and gentle and proud and humorous and demanding and unpredictable".

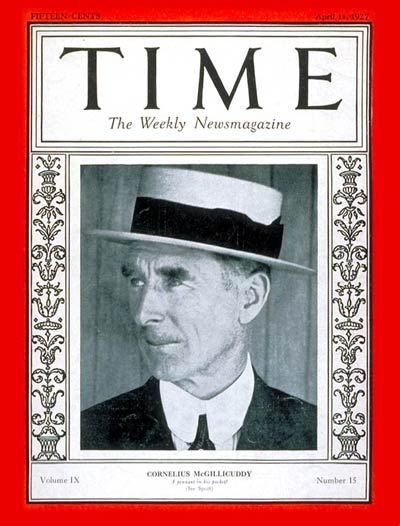
Mack on the cover of the April 11, 1927 edition of Time magazine

Beginning as far back as his first managing job in the 19th century, Mack drew criticism from the newspapers for not spending enough money. Some writers called him an outright miser, accusing him of getting rid of star players so he could "line his own pockets" with the money. However, his biographer Norman Macht strongly defends Mack on this question, contending that Mack's spending decisions were forced on him by his financial circumstances, and that nearly all the money he made went back to the team.

Mack himself was upset by these allegations: when some writers accused him of deliberately losing the second game of the 1913 World Series in order to extend the series and make more money in ticket sales, he uncharacteristically wrote an angry letter to the Saturday Evening Post to deny it, saying "I consider playing for the gate receipts ... nothing short of dishonest." With the Athletics leading the Series three games to one, several New York writers predicted that the Athletics would deliberately lose game five in New York so that Mack would not have to refund the $50,000 in ticket sales for game six in Philadelphia. After reading this, Mack told his players that if they won Game Five he would give them the team's entire share of the Game Five gate receipts—about $34,000. The Athletics won the game and the series, and Mack gave out the money as promised.

Mack supported a large extended family and was generous to players in need, often finding jobs for former players. For instance, he kept Bender on the team payroll as a scout, minor league manager or coach from 1926 until Mack himself retired as owner-manager in 1950. Simmons was a coach for many years after his retirement as a player.

Mack lived through the entire era of racially segregated baseball; the early days of the game in his youth sometimes featured black players, but this ended by the 1890s and the major leagues remained white-only until Jackie Robinson broke down the color barrier in 1947, and even afterwards Mack never displayed any serious interest in signing black players. The Athletics did not have a black player until Bob Trice in 1953, three years after Mack retired as manager.

Bobby Shantz, a former player for both Mack and Casey Stengel, stated that the only difference between the two managers was that "One never said anything and the other never shut up!"

I shall never forget Connie Mack's gentleness and gentility.

— Ty Cobb, The New York Times

== Legacy ==
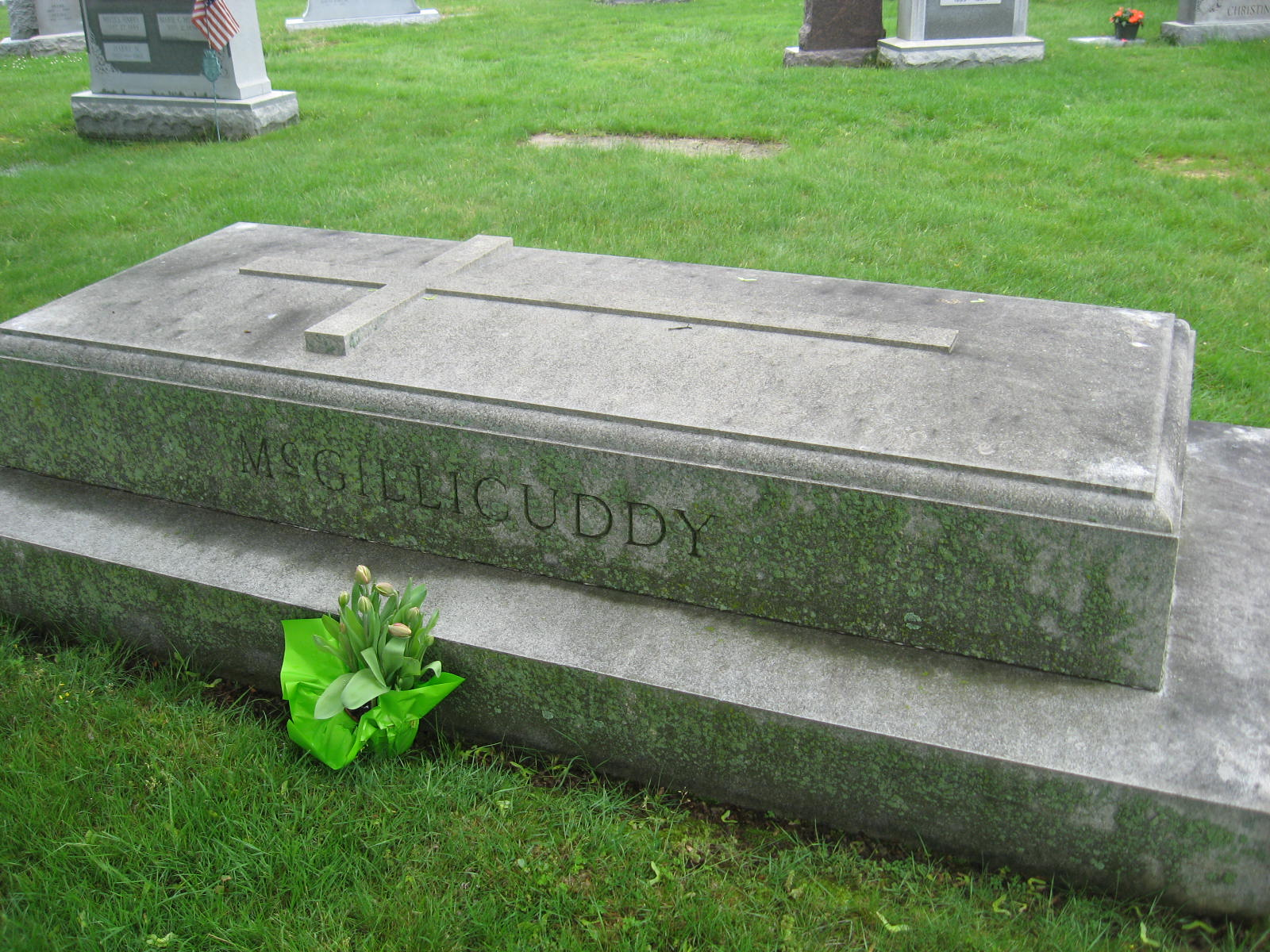
The grave of Connie Mack, located at Holy Sepulchre Cemetery in Glenside, Pennsylvania.

The Philadelphia stadium, originally called Shibe Park, was renamed Connie Mack Stadium in 1953. Starting in 1909, it was home to the Athletics, and starting in 1938, it also was home to the Phillies, then from 1955 to 1970 was home to the Phillies alone, after the Athletics moved to Kansas City.

There is a Connie Mack Street in San Antonio, Texas.

Mack is mentioned in the 1949 poem "Line-Up for Yesterday" by Ogden Nash:

Line-Up for Yesterday

Q is for Don Quixote
Cornelius Mack;
Neither Yankees nor years
Can halt his attack.

— Ogden Nash, Sport magazine (January 1949)

== Family ==
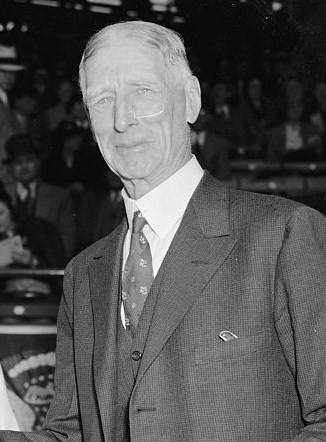
Opening Day, April 18, 1938, Griffith Stadium, Washington, D.C.

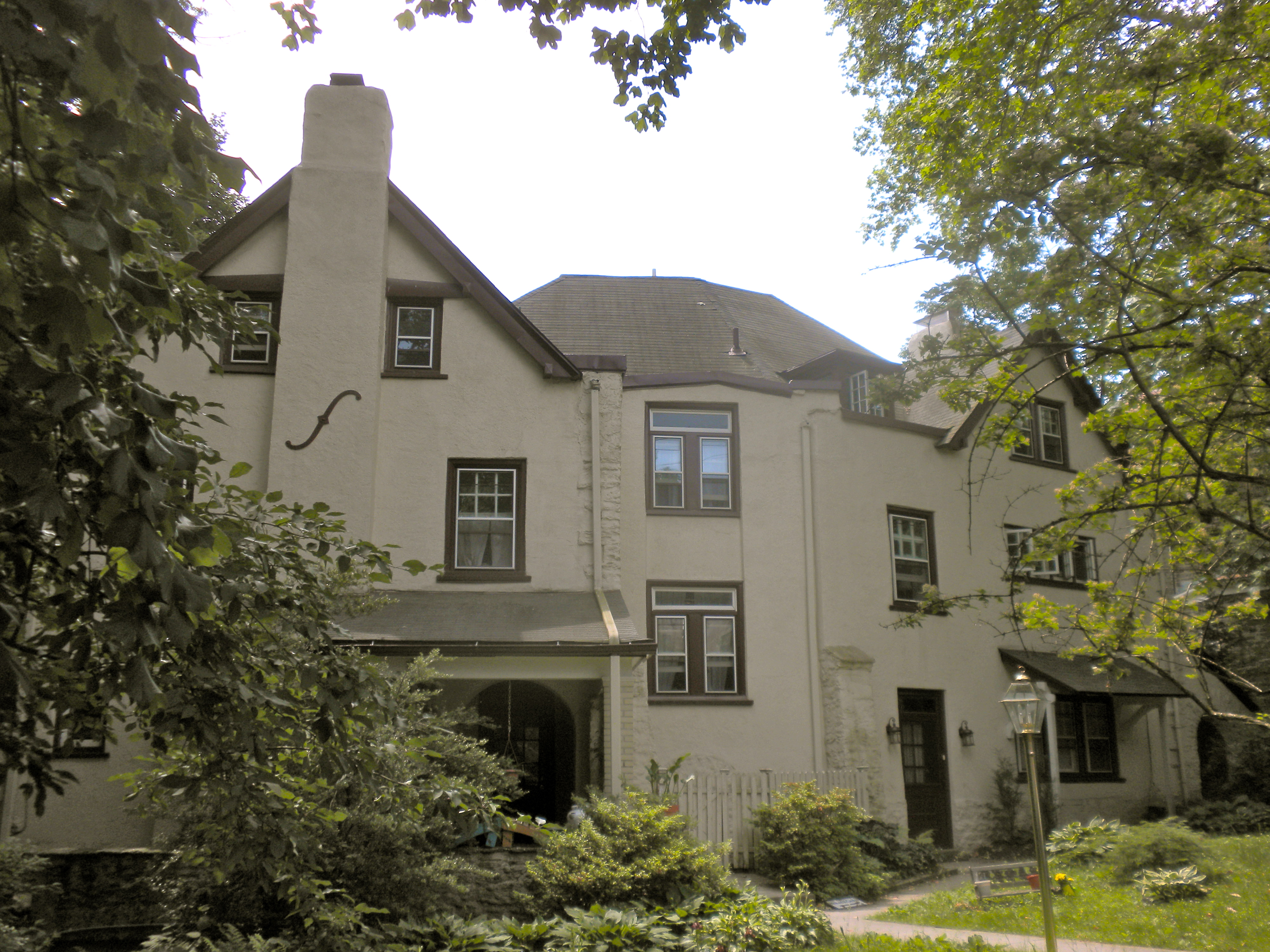
Home of Connie Mack on Cliveden Avenue in Northwest Philadelphia

On November 2, 1887, Mack married Margaret Hogan, whom the Spencer Leader described as having "a sunny and vivacious disposition." They had three children, Earle, Roy, and Marguerite. Margaret died in December 1892 after complications from her third childbirth.

Mack married a second time on October 27, 1910. His second wife was Catherine (or Katharine) Holahan (or Hoolahan) (1879–1966); the census records have various spellings (the wedding register reads "Catarina Hallahan"). The couple had four daughters and a son, Cornelius Jr. A faithful Catholic his entire life, Mack was also a longtime member of the Knights of Columbus (Santa Maria Council 263 in Germantown, which moved to Flourtown, Pennsylvania in the 1980s).

Mack's son Earle Mack played several games for the A's between 1910 and 1914, and also managed the team for parts of the 1937 and 1939 seasons when his father was too ill to do so. In more recent years, his descendants have taken to politics: Mack's grandson Connie Mack III was a member of the U.S. House of Representatives from Florida (1983–89) and the United States Senate (1989–2001); and great-grandson Connie Mack IV served in the U.S. House of Representatives (2005–13), representing Florida's 14th congressional district.

== See also ==
- List of Major League Baseball managerial wins and winning percentage leaders
- List of Major League Baseball player–managers
