= Scotty Barr =

American baseball player

- Outfielder / Infielder
- Born: October 6, 1886; Bristol, Tennessee, U.S.
- Died: December 2, 1934 (aged 48); Ft. Worth, Texas, U.S.
- Batted: Right Threw: Right

MLB debut
- August 22, 1908, for the Philadelphia Athletics

Last MLB appearance
- July 17, 1909, for the Philadelphia Athletics

MLB statistics
- Batting average: .112
- Home runs: 0
- Runs batted in: 2
- Stats at Baseball Reference

Teams
- Philadelphia Athletics (1908–1909)

Hyder Edward "Scotty" Barr (October 6, 1886 – December 2, 1934) was an American Major League Baseball player. Barr played for the Philadelphia Athletics in the 1908 and 1909 seasons. An alumnus of Davidson College, he was born in Bristol, Tennessee and died in Ft. Worth, Texas.
