= John Kull =

American baseball player (1882–1936)

- Pitcher
- Born: June 24, 1882; Shenandoah, Pennsylvania, U.S.
- Died: March 30, 1936 (aged 53); Schuylkill Haven, Pennsylvania, U.S.
- Batted: Left Threw: Left

MLB debut
- October 2, 1909, for the Philadelphia Athletics

Last MLB appearance
- October 2, 1909, for the Philadelphia Athletics

MLB statistics
- Win–loss record: 1–0
- Earned run average: 3.00
- Strikeouts: 4
- Stats at Baseball Reference

Teams
- Philadelphia Athletics (1909)

John A. Kull (born John A. Kolonauski; June 24, 1882 – March 30, 1936) was an American Major League Baseball pitcher. Kull played for the Philadelphia Athletics in 1909. In his one and only career game, he had a 1–0 record, going three innings, and striking out four batters. This give him a career winning percentage of 1.000. He also handed his one fielding chance (an assist) flawlessly, giving him a lifetime fielding percentage of 1.000. He batted and threw left-handed, and singled in his only turn at-bat driving in two runs for an MLB career batting average of 1.000.

Although several dozen pitchers retired with a career winning percentage of 1.000, and numerous batters and fielders retired with career batting and fielding averages of 1.000 (all of whom had very short MLB careers), Kull remains the only MLB player to ever finish his career with a 1.000 mark in all three statistical categories.

Kull was born in Shenandoah, Pennsylvania and died in Schuylkill Haven, Pennsylvania.
