= Amos Strunk =

American baseball player (1889–1979)

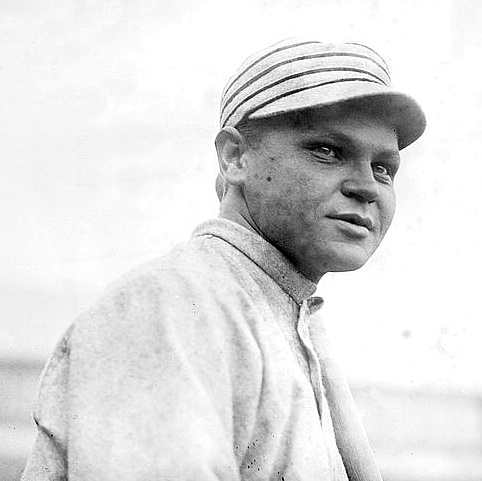
- Center fielder
- Born: January 22, 1889; Philadelphia, Pennsylvania, U.S.
- Died: June 22, 1979 (aged 90); Llanerch, Pennsylvania, U.S.
- Batted: Right Threw: Right

MLB debut
- September 24, 1908, for the Philadelphia Athletics

Last MLB appearance
- June 28, 1924, for the Philadelphia Athletics

MLB statistics
- Batting average: .284
- Home runs: 15
- Runs batted in: 529
- Stats at Baseball Reference

Teams
- Philadelphia Athletics (1908–1917); Boston Red Sox (1918–1919); Philadelphia Athletics (1919–1920); Chicago White Sox (1920–1924); Philadelphia Athletics (1924)

Career highlights and awards
- 4× World Series champion (1910, 1911, 1913, 1918)

Amos Aaron Strunk (January 22, 1889 – July 22, 1979) was an American center fielder who played in Major League Baseball from 1908 through 1924. A member of four World Series champion teams, Strunk batted and threw left-handed. He was born in Philadelphia.

A dependable and speedy player, both on the basepaths and in the field, Strunk was scouted and signed by Philadelphia Athletics' manager Connie Mack, who did not hesitate to call him "the most underrated outfielder in baseball".

Strunk reached the majors in 1908 with the Athletics, spending nine years with them before moving to the Boston Red Sox (1918–19), and played again for Philadelphia (1919–20) and in parts of four seasons with the Chicago White Sox (1920–23). Then, he returned with the Athletics in 1924, his last major league season. Five times he led American League outfielders in fielding percentage, and played in five World Series with the Athletics (1910–11, 1913–14) and Red Sox (1918).

In a 17-season career, Strunk was a .284 hitter (1418-for-4999) with 15 home runs and 529 RBI in 1512 games played, including 696 runs, 213 doubles, 96 triples and 185 stolen bases. His career fielding percentage at all three outfield positions and first base was .980.

Following his baseball career, Strunk spent fifty years in the insurance business. He died in Llanerch, Pennsylvania, at the age of 90.

He was the last surviving member of the 1910, 1911 and 1913 World Champion Philadelphia Athletics.

== See also ==
- List of Major League Baseball career stolen bases leaders
