= Harry Krause =

American baseball player (1888-1940)

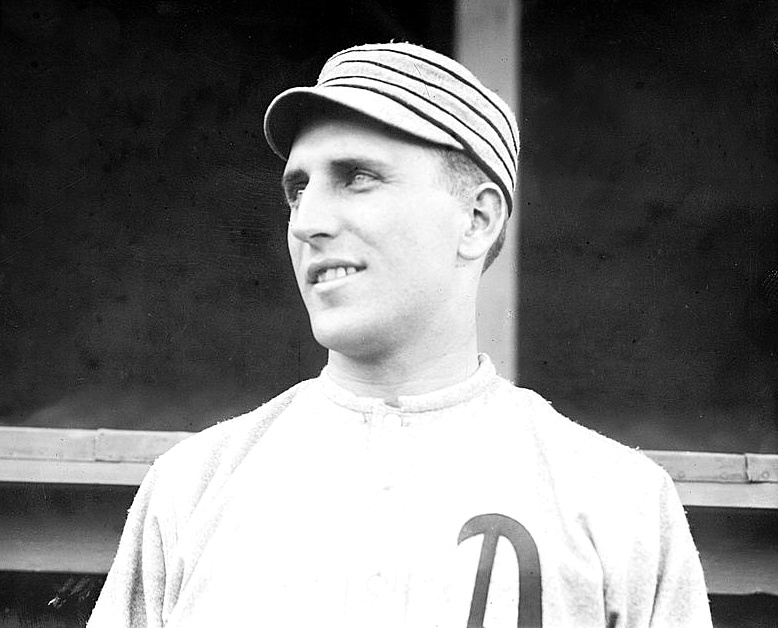
- Pitcher
- Born: July 12, 1888; San Francisco, California, U.S.
- Died: October 23, 1940 (aged 52); San Francisco, California, U.S.
- Batted: Switch Threw: Left

MLB debut
- April 20, 1908, for the Philadelphia Athletics

Last MLB appearance
- July 28, 1912, for the Cleveland Naps

MLB statistics
- Win–loss record: 36–26
- Earned run average: 2.50
- Strikeouts: 298
- Stats at Baseball Reference

Teams
- Philadelphia Athletics (1908–1912); Cleveland Naps (1912)

Career highlights and awards
- AL ERA leader (1909); 2× World Series champion (1910, 1911)

Harry William "Hal" Krause (July 12, 1888 – October 23, 1940) was an American Major League Baseball player. He was a pitcher over parts of five seasons (1908–1912) with the Philadelphia Athletics and Cleveland Naps. He led the American League in earned run average in 1909 while playing for Philadelphia. For his career, he compiled a 36–26 record, with a 2.50 ERA and 289 strikeouts.

== Biography ==
Krause was born in San Francisco, California, and attended Saint Mary's College of California. He started his professional baseball career in 1907, heading East at the age of 19 in 1908. In the Tri-State League he went 17-14, later joining the Athletics.

Krause made an immediate impact in the major leagues. He started out 1909 with a 10-game winning streak, which included six shutouts. He finished the season 18–8 with a league-leading 1.39 ERA. It is the lowest ERA ever for an American League rookie.

Krause didn't pitch as often or as well in 1910 and 1911. He had arm trouble early in 1910 which forced him to miss some time, but pitched well enough in 1911 that he was considered for use in the 1911 World Series, although he wasn't needed. The 1912 Reach Guide credits him with helping carry the pitching burden for the 1911 team while stars Jack Coombs and Chief Bender were less effective than usual early in the season. In 1912, he came down with a sore arm, pitched badly in six games, and then went to the minor league Toledo Mud Hens. He went 13–4 with Toledo. The following season, he returned to the west coast and joined the Portland Beavers of the Pacific Coast League. In 1913 and 1914, Krause won a total of 39 games with ERAs below 2.30. He had an off year in 1915, however, and played in the Western League in 1916. He went back to the PCL in 1917 with the Oakland Oaks.

Krause spent 12 years in Oakland. In his first season there, he set career-highs in wins and innings pitched in the long PCL season, going 28–26 with a 2.35 ERA in 428.2 innings. He continued to pitch well for the Oaks over the next decade, becoming a fixture in the starting rotation and winning over 20 games two more times. In 1928, he joined the Mission Reds, where he finished his playing career. Krause won a total of 249 games in the PCL over 16 seasons. He is also a member of the Pacific Coast League Hall of Fame.

In October 1940, Krause was involved in a car accident. He died eight days later. He was survived by his wife, Marie.

== See also ==
- List of Major League Baseball annual ERA leaders
