= Paddy Livingston =

American baseball player (1880–1977)

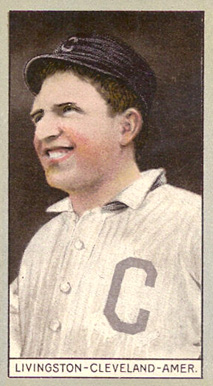
- Catcher
- Born: January 14, 1880; Cleveland, Ohio, U.S.
- Died: September 19, 1977 (aged 97); Cleveland, Ohio, U.S.
- Batted: Right Threw: Right

MLB debut
- September 2, 1901, for the Cleveland Blues

Last MLB appearance
- June 15, 1917, for the St. Louis Cardinals

MLB statistics
- Batting average: .209
- Hits: 120
- Stats at Baseball Reference

Teams
- Cleveland Blues (1901); Cincinnati Reds (1906); Philadelphia Athletics (1909–1911); Cleveland Naps (1912); St. Louis Cardinals (1917)

Career highlights and awards
- 2× World Series champion (1910, 1911)

Patrick Joseph Livingston (January 14, 1880 – September 19, 1977) was an American professional baseball catcher who played in Major League Baseball for seven seasons. He played for the Cleveland Blues in 1901, the Cincinnati Reds in 1906, the Philadelphia Athletics from 1909 to 1911, the Cleveland Naps in 1912, and the St. Louis Cardinals in 1917. Livingston was the last surviving player of the inaugural year for the American League, 1901. At the time of his death, he was the oldest living former major league player.

Records
Preceded by Charlie Emig	Oldest recognized verified living baseball player October 2, 1975 – September 19, 1977	Succeeded by Sam Edmonston
