= Ed Larkin =

American baseball player (1885-1934)

- Catcher
- Born: July 1, 1885; Wyalusing, Pennsylvania
- Died: March 28, 1934 (aged 48); Wyalusing, Pennsylvania
- Batted: Right Threw: Right

MLB debut
- October 2, 1909, for the Philadelphia Athletics

Last MLB appearance
- October 2, 1909, for the Philadelphia Athletics

MLB statistics
- Batting average: .167
- Home runs: 0
- Runs batted in: 1
- Stats at Baseball Reference

Teams
- Philadelphia Athletics (1909)

Edward Francis Larkin (July 1, 1885 – March 28, 1934) was an American Major League Baseball catcher. He played for the Philadelphia Athletics during the 1909 season.
