= Tommy Atkins (baseball) =

American baseball player (1887–1956)

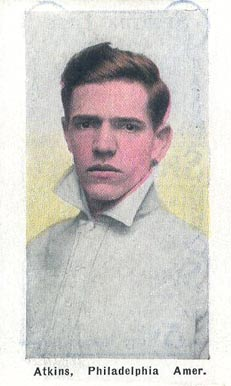
- Pitcher
- Born: December 9, 1887; Ponca, Nebraska, U.S.
- Died: May 7, 1956 (aged 68); Cleveland, Ohio, U.S.
- Batted: Left Threw: Left

MLB debut
- October 2, 1909, for the Philadelphia Athletics

Last MLB appearance
- September 28, 1910, for the Philadelphia Athletics

MLB statistics
- Win–loss record: 3-2
- Earned run average: 2.86
- Strikeouts: 33
- Stats at Baseball Reference

Teams
- Philadelphia Athletics (1909–1910)

Francis Montgomery "Tommy" Atkins (December 9, 1887 – May 7, 1956) was an American pitcher in Major League Baseball. Atkins made one start for the Philadelphia Athletics in 1909 and a further 15 appearances (four starts) during 1910. According to the 1911 Reach Guide, Atkins had a key pitch called the "fingernail fling".
