= Jimmy Dygert =

American baseball player (1884-1936)

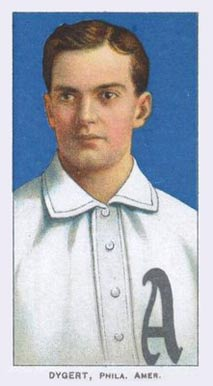
- Pitcher
- Born: July 5, 1884; Utica, New York, U.S.
- Died: February 7, 1936 (aged 51); New Orleans, Louisiana, U.S.
- Batted: Right Threw: Right

MLB debut
- September 8, 1905, for the Philadelphia Athletics

Last MLB appearance
- October 6, 1910, for the Philadelphia Athletics

MLB statistics
- Win–loss record: 57-49
- Earned run average: 2.65
- Strikeouts: 583
- Stats at Baseball Reference

Teams
- Philadelphia Athletics (1905–1910)

James Henry Dygert (July 5, 1884 – February 8, 1936) was an American pitcher in Major League Baseball from 1905 to 1910. He played for the Philadelphia Athletics of the American League.

== Career ==
Dygert, a spitball specialist, started his professional baseball career in 1904 in Poughkeepsie, New York. In 1905, he went 18–4 with the pennant-winning New Orleans Pelicans, and he was purchased by the Athletics in August. He pitched a few games down the stretch but went just 1–4. The next season, he broke into the A's starting rotation and improved his record to 11–13. He pitched a combined no-hitter with Rube Waddell on August 29.

Dygert hit his peak in 1907. On a pitching staff with three Hall of Famers – Chief Bender, Eddie Plank, and Waddell – Dygert was the number three starter. He completed the season with a 21–8 record, 151 strikeouts, and a 2.34 earned run average. In the pennant stretch of October, he pitched three shutouts in four days. The A's finished just 1.5 games out of first place.

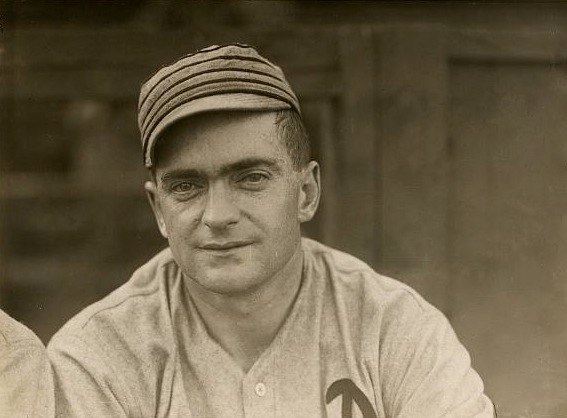
Jimmy Dygert, circa 1911

In 1908, Dygert again struck out a lot of batters (164), but he also led the league in walks with 97. He pitched less in 1909 and 1910. The A's won the pennant in 1910, but Dygert did not pitch in the World Series. In 1911, he moved to the Eastern League's Baltimore Orioles and went 25–15 in a career-high 318.2 innings; he also led the league with 218 strikeouts. However, that was his last season as an effective pitcher. He retired in 1913.

Dygert was very skinny even for his era, weighing about 115 pounds. Bill James listed him as one of the lightest major league players of the 1900–1909 decade. Baseball Digest wrote that he was probably the lightest pitcher of the 20th century. Nonetheless, Dygert was also one of the best spitballers when the pitch was legal and is considered the greatest ever for his weight.

After his baseball days, Dygert became a construction foreman and was married to Clara Castaing. He died of lobar pneumonia on February 7, 1936.
