= Ira Thomas =

American baseball player (1881–1958)

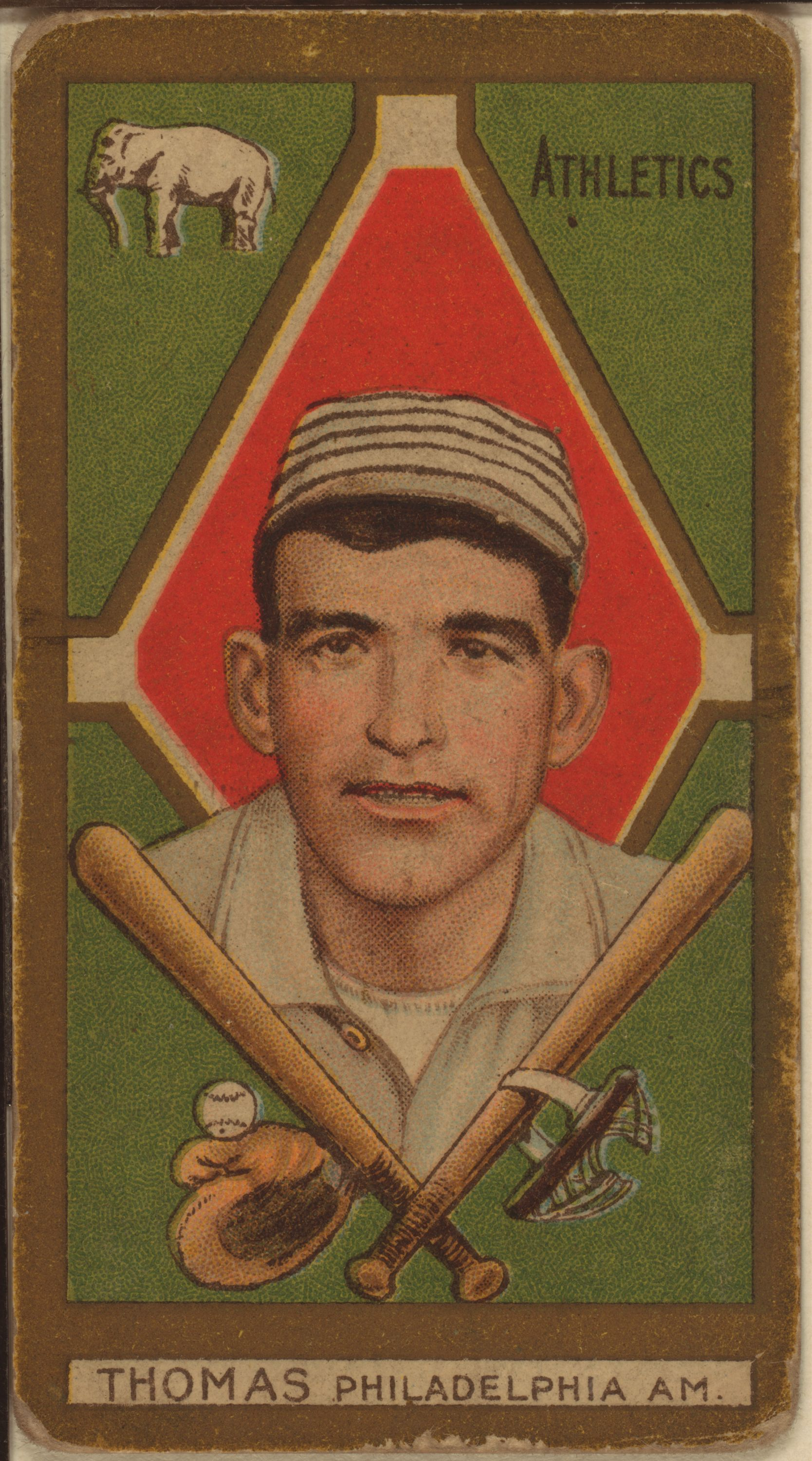
- Catcher
- Born: January 22, 1881; Ballston Spa, New York, U.S.
- Died: October 11, 1958 (aged 77); Philadelphia, Pennsylvania, U.S.
- Batted: Right Threw: Right

MLB debut
- May 18, 1906, for the New York Highlanders

Last MLB appearance
- June 18, 1915, for the Philadelphia Athletics

MLB statistics
- Batting average: .242
- Home runs: 3
- Runs batted in: 155
- Stats at Baseball Reference

Teams
- New York Highlanders (1906–1907); Detroit Tigers (1908); Philadelphia Athletics (1909–1915)

Career highlights and awards
- 3x World Series champion (1910, 1911, 1913)

Ira Felix Thomas (January 22, 1881 – October 11, 1958) was an American professional baseball player. He played all or part of ten seasons of Major League Baseball, all in the American League, with the New York Highlanders (1906–1907), Detroit Tigers (1908), and Philadelphia Athletics (1909–1915), primarily as a catcher.

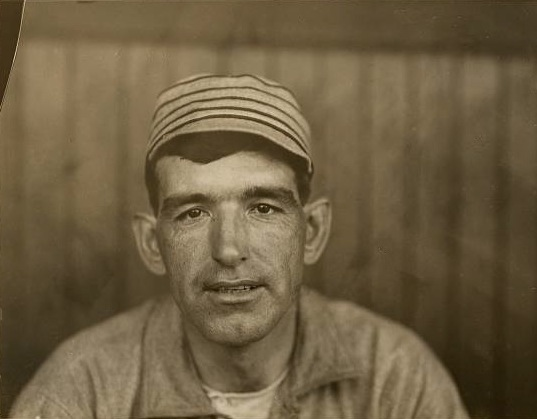
Ira Thomas, circa 1911.

Thomas was born in Ballston Spa, New York, and began his playing career in the minor Connecticut League in 1902. After playing two seasons with the Highlanders in the major leagues, Thomas moved to the Tigers in 1908 and served as backup catcher to Boss Schmidt. In Game 1 of the 1908 World Series, he pinch hit for shortstop Charley O'Leary in the ninth inning and singled for the first pinch base hit in World Series play.

He played six seasons to finish his career with the Athletics. He was the team captain and shared equal catching duty with Jack Lapp as the Athletics won consecutive World Series in 1910 and 1911. The team also won an American League pennant and a World Series, in 1913 and 1914, respectively, although Thomas did not play in either of the latter two World Series. In the 1911 season, Thomas finished eighth in American League MVP voting, with 17 extra base hits and 101 total bases. In 484 career games, he batted .242 with 327 hits and 155 RBI.

In the summer of 1916, Thomas was hired to coach baseball at Williams College. He resigned prior to the 1921 season in order to focus on his business obligations.

In 1918, while the great Influenza hammered Philadelphia, Ira volunteered at great personal risk to drive the sick to hospital for treatment.

Thomas managed the United States national baseball team that participated in the 1941 Amateur World Series, held in Havana, Cuba. The United States team was composed mostly of players of the Pennsylvania Athletic Club of Philadelphia, including future Athletics pitcher Tal Abernathy. The U.S. team finished sixth in the tournament.

After retiring, Thomas was a scout for the Athletics, remaining with the franchise even as it relocated to Kansas City in 1955. Thomas had been hospitalized for five weeks prior to his death in Philadelphia, Pennsylvania on October 11, 1958.
