= Topsy Hartsel =

American baseball player (1874–1944)

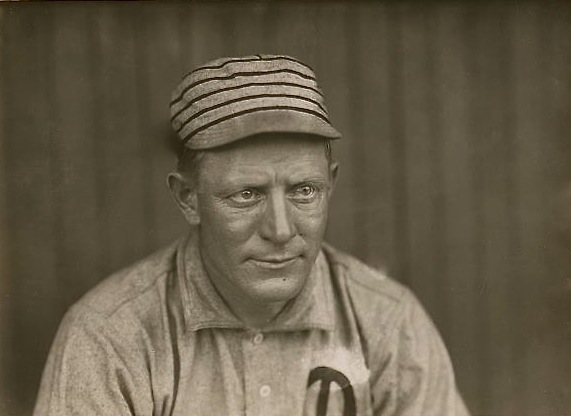
- Topsy Hartsel, circa 1911
- Outfielder
- Born: June 26, 1874; Polk, Ohio, U.S.
- Died: October 14, 1944 (aged 70); Toledo, Ohio, U.S.
- Batted: Left Threw: Left

MLB debut
- September 14, 1898, for the Louisville Colonels

Last MLB appearance
- September 30, 1911, for the Philadelphia Athletics

MLB statistics
- Batting average: .276
- Home runs: 31
- Runs batted in: 341
- Stats at Baseball Reference

Teams
- Louisville Colonels (1898–1899); Cincinnati Reds (1900); Chicago Orphans (1901); Philadelphia Athletics (1902–1911)

Career highlights and awards
- 2× World Series champion (1910, 1911); AL stolen base leader (1902)

Tully Frederick "Topsy" Hartsel (June 26, 1874 – October 14, 1944) was an American outfielder in Major League Baseball. He was born in Polk, Ohio, and played for the Louisville Colonels (1898–99), Cincinnati Reds (1900), Chicago Orphans (1901) and Philadelphia Athletics (1902–11), with whom he won the World Series in 1910.

Hartsel spent the first three years of his professional career as a part-time outfielder for the Colonels and Reds. In 1901, he enjoyed a breakout season with the Orphans, setting career highs in hits (187), runs (111), doubles (25), home runs (7), total bases (265), batting average (.335), and on-base plus slugging (.889). On September 10, 1901, he established the record for putouts by a left fielder in a nine-inning game, with 11 against the Brooklyn Superbas.

In a 14-year, 1,356-game major league career, Hartsel recorded a .276 batting average with 826 runs, 31 home runs, 341 RBI, 247 stolen bases and 837 bases on balls. His career fielding percentage as an outfielder was .956. In the 1905 and 1910 World Series, he hit .227 (5-for-22).

Philadelphia manager Connie Mack looked for players with quiet and disciplined personal lives, having seen many players in his playing days destroy themselves and their teams through heavy drinking. Mack himself never drank; before the 1910 World Series he asked all his players to "take the pledge" not to drink during the Series. When Topsy Hartsel told Mack he needed a drink the night before the final game, Mack told him to do what he thought best, but in these circumstances "if it was me, I'd die before I took a drink."

Hartsel died in Toledo, Ohio, on October 14, 1944.

== See also ==
- List of Major League Baseball annual runs scored leaders
- List of Major League Baseball annual stolen base leaders

== Sources ==
- Career statistics from Baseball Reference · Retrosheet · Baseball Almanac
