= 1910 World Series =

1910 Major League Baseball championship series

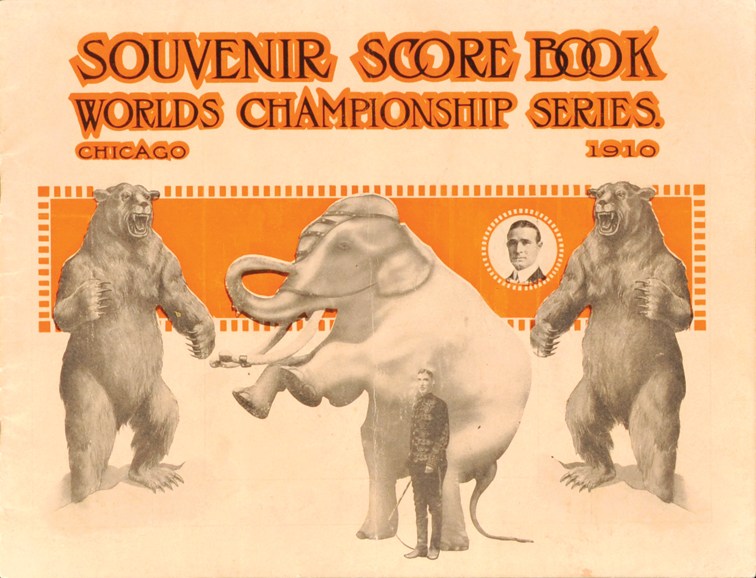
Team (Wins)	Managers	Season
Philadelphia Athletics (4)	Connie Mack	102–48, .680, GA: 14 1/2
Chicago Cubs (1)	Frank Chance (player/manager)	104–50, .675, GA: 13
- Dates: October 17–23
- Venue(s): Shibe Park (Philadelphia); West Side Park (Chicago)
- Umpires: Tommy Connolly (AL), Cy Rigler (NL), Jack Sheridan (AL), Hank O'Day (NL)
- Hall of Famers: Umpires: Tommy Connolly; Hank O'Day; Athletics: Connie Mack (manager); Frank Baker; Chief Bender; Eddie Collins; Eddie Plank (DNP); Cubs: Mordecai Brown; Frank Chance; Johnny Evers (DNP); Joe Tinker

The 1910 World Series was the championship series in Major League Baseball for the 1910 season. The seventh edition of the World Series, it was a best-of-seven playoff between the American League (AL) champion Philadelphia Athletics against the National League (NL) champion Chicago Cubs. The series was played from October 17 to 23. The Athletics won the first three games before Chicago staved off elimination in Game 4 with the first ever occasion of the home team winning on a double in extra innings; in modern terms, it is the first "walkoff hit" in World Series history. Philadelphia finished them off in Game 5 to win the series 4 games to 1, clinching the team's first World Series championship. This was the first major professional sports championship ever won by a Philadelphia-based team.

Jack Coombs of Philadelphia won three games and Eddie Collins supplied timely hitting by batting .429, which led all batters in the Series.

== Background ==
=== Philadelphia Athletics ===
The Athletics were making their second appearance in the World Series. They had lost the 1905 edition four games to one against the New York Giants. They had dominated the American League, leading it since early May, and eventually winning it by 14 1/2 games. Their pitcher Jack Coombs led the American League in wins with a 31–9 record, and the Athletics had the lowest ERA in the league by some margin.

=== Chicago Cubs ===
The Chicago Cubs were a dominant team in the first decade of the 1900s. They had already won two World Series, and been runners-up in another; this was their fourth appearance. The National League was initially closer than the American League, with the Cubs wrestling control of the division from the Pittsburgh Pirates in late May after a long winning streak. They never looked back, only increasing their lead over the course of the season. The Cubs' slugger Frank Schulte led the National League in home runs with 10, while pitcher King Cole had the lowest ERA in the league, 1.80. The Chicago Cubs won the division by 13 games.

=== Series preview ===
Before the series, pundits were split over who the favorites were. The pitching of the Athletics was generally held to be superior to that of the Cubs, as the Cubs pitchers were thought to be merely decent. The Cubs, however, were felt to have a stronger catcher in Johnny Kling, and slightly stronger batters as well. Altogether, Philadelphia had a younger team, while Chicago had an older but experienced group of players. Former coach Ned Hanlon picked the Athletics, as did former pitcher Jack Dunn. However, John McGraw, manager of the New York Giants, held that the Cubs would win the series. Before the series, the Athletics played the All-Stars, featuring Ty Cobb; they played poorly on the Friday before the Series, which lowered confidence in the ability of the Philadelphia team. Second baseman Johnny Evers was out injured for the Cubs, while outfielder and strong batter Rube Oldring was injured for the Athletics.

This World Series featured a new ball, manufactured by the Reach Company. It had a cork center, not a rubber one. The ball was meant to be stronger and hold up better instead of becoming soft and losing its shape after being used for a long period of time.

== Summary ==
Philadelphia won the series, 4–1.

Game	Date	Score	Location	Time	Attendance
1	October 17	Chicago Cubs – 1, Philadelphia Athletics – 4	Shibe Park	1:54	26,892
2	October 18	Chicago Cubs – 3, Philadelphia Athletics – 9	Shibe Park	2:25	24,597
3	October 20	Philadelphia Athletics – 12, Chicago Cubs – 5	West Side Park	2:07	26,210
4	October 22	Philadelphia Athletics – 3, Chicago Cubs – 4 (10)	West Side Park	2:14	19,151
5	October 23	Philadelphia Athletics – 7, Chicago Cubs – 2	West Side Park	2:06	27,374

== Matchups ==
=== Game 1 ===
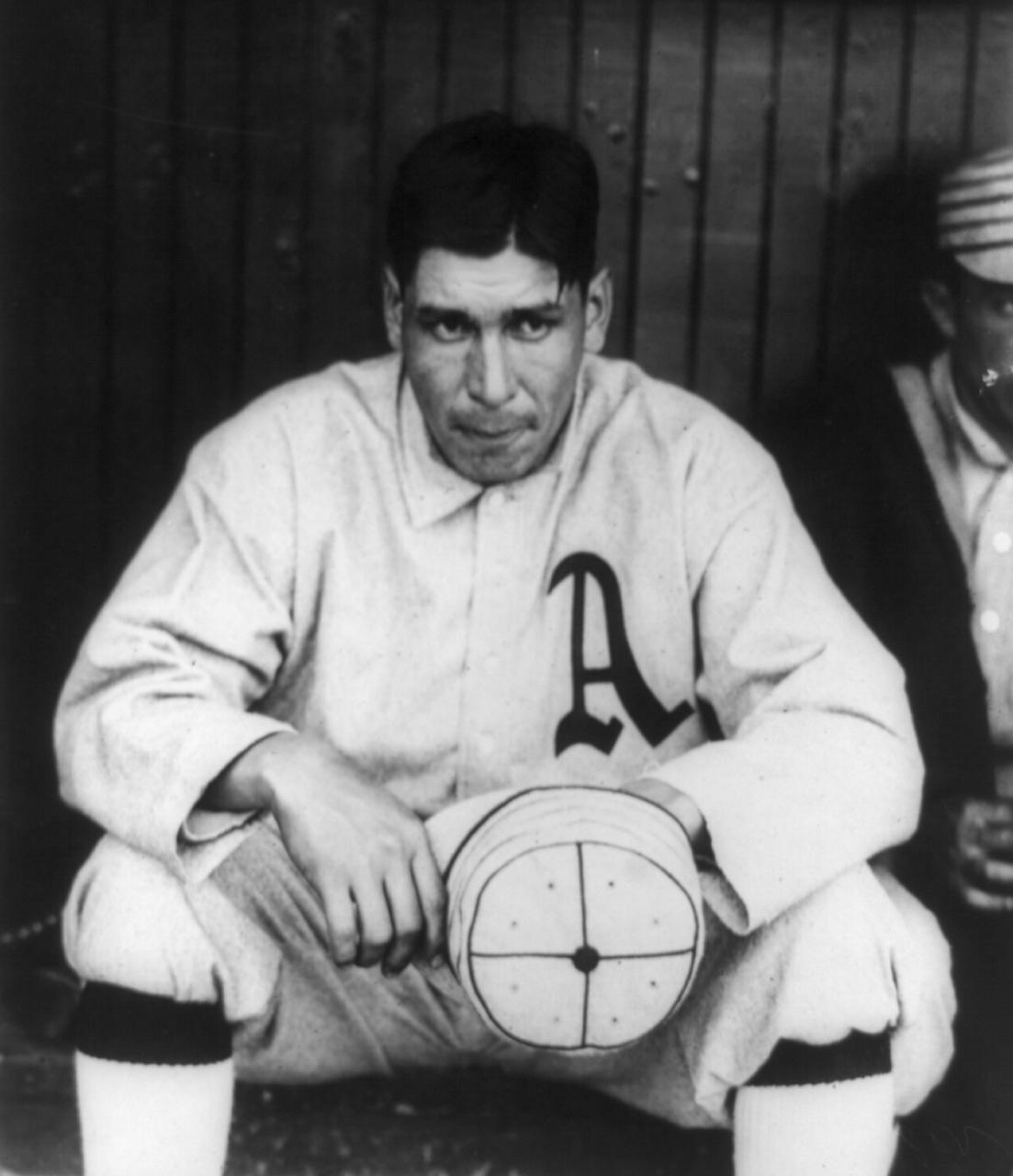
Chief Bender helped Philadelphia to win a low-scoring Game 1.

Monday, October 17, 1910 2:00 pm (ET) at Shibe Park in Philadelphia, Pennsylvania
Team	1	2	3	4	5	6	7	8	9	R	H	E
Chicago	0	0	0	0	0	0	0	0	1	1	3	1
Philadelphia	0	2	1	0	0	0	0	1	X	4	7	2
WP: Chief Bender (1–0) LP: Orval Overall (0–1)

Connie Mack chose Chief Bender to start game 1, while Orval Overall was selected by Frank Chance. The second inning began with a double by Home Run Baker. Harry Davis sacrificed, and Danny Murphy singled to left to send Baker home. Murphy then stole second and advanced to third on Jack Barry's sacrifice. Chief Bender, the pitcher, then came up to bat, and managed to bat in a run. The next inning began with a Bris Lord double and a Eddie Collins sacrifice. Home Run Baker hit a single to shortstop which allowed Lord to score, and the score was 0–3.

With two outs in the eighth inning, Eddie Collins was walked. Collins was a leading base-stealer and McIntire attempted to get him out at first, but his throw to the first baseman was wild and Collins advanced to third. Home Run Baker hit a double to right field and made it 0–4. In the ninth inning, a foul by Joe Tinker was fumbled by Athletics catcher Ira Thomas, and on the next pitch, Tinker hit a double. Johnny Kling then doubled and Tinker scored. Frank Schulte was walked, and it seemed a comeback may be on, but Solly Hofman grounded out, ending the game at 1–4.

Chief Bender allowed the Cubs just three hits and one unearned run. Before the ninth inning, Bender had allowed only one hit and one base on balls. He also registered seven strikeouts, and, unusually for a pitcher, an RBI. Frank Baker had three hits and two RBI for the A's.

=== Game 2 ===
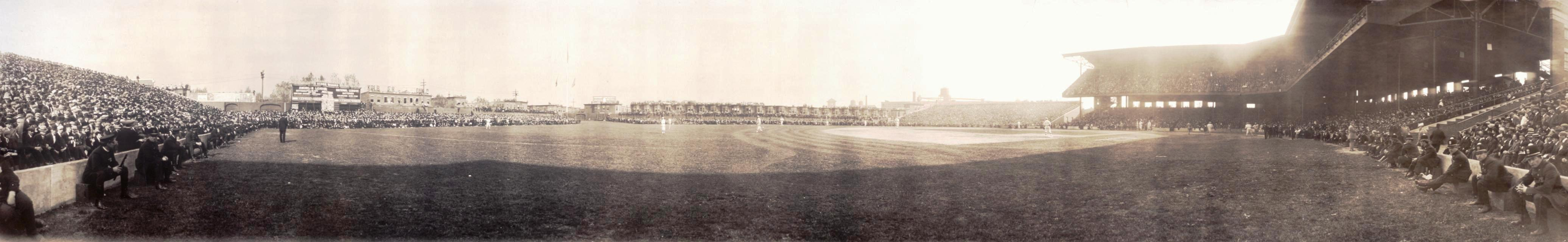
Game 2

Tuesday, October 18, 1910 2:00 pm (ET) at Shibe Park in Philadelphia, Pennsylvania
Team	1	2	3	4	5	6	7	8	9	R	H	E
Chicago	1	0	0	0	0	0	1	0	1	3	8	3
Philadelphia	0	0	2	0	1	0	6	0	X	9	14	4
WP: Jack Coombs (1–0) LP: Mordecai Brown (0–1)

Star pitcher Jack Coombs was the starter for the Athletics, while Mordecai Brown began the game for the Cubs. Before the game, Ty Cobb and Nap Lajoie, winners of the Chalmers Awards, were presented with new cars from Chalmers Motor Company, though Lajoie was not present and a friend accepted the car in his stead.

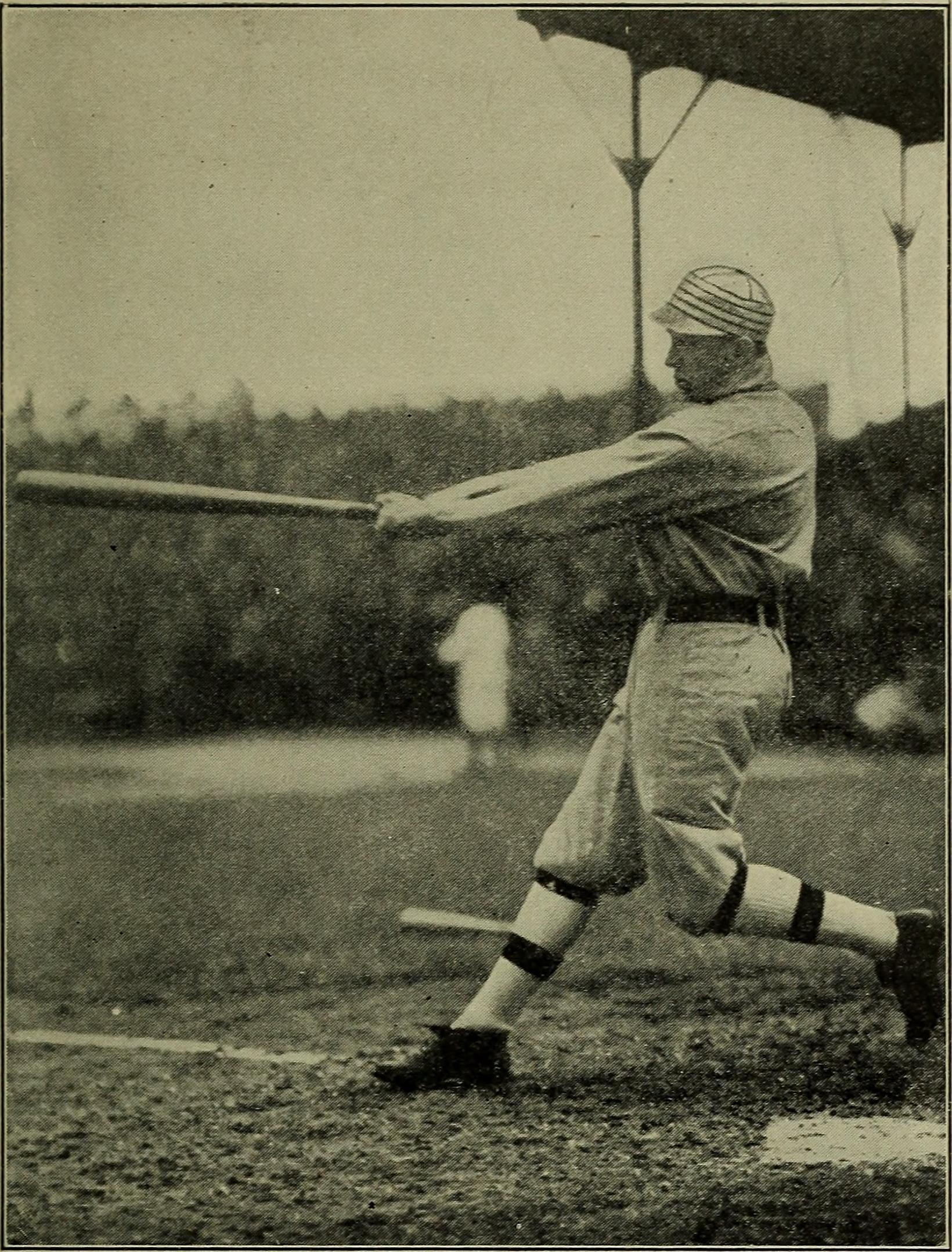
Eddie Collins had a strong game for the Athletics.

Jack Coombs started the game shakily, walking Jimmy Sheckard, who was forced out at second after Frank Schulte grounded and got to first base. Solly Hofman was also walked by Coombs, allowing Frank Chance to single and load the bases. Heinie Zimmerman then hit a sacrifice to score one run for the Cubs. Coombs recovered somewhat and struck Harry Steinfeldt out, ending the inning with a score of 1–0. In the bottom of the third inning, Ira Thomas advanced to first after an error, and Amos Strunk and Bris Lord had base hits, though Strunk was forced out at second base. Eddie Collins hit a double, allowing Thomas and Lord to reach home and make the score 1–2. Although Coombs continued to struggle, and twice fumbled the ball in the fifth inning, good fielding allowed Philadelphia to keep Chicago at one run. Harry Davis singled to left in the bottom of the fifth, allowing Eddie Collins to score from second base, increasing the Athletics' lead to 1–3.

In the seventh inning, the Cubs got one back after Jimmy Sheckard doubled and Frank Chance hit hard to center. Coombs additionally walked Solly Hofman for the third time, and the game no longer looked as though it was firmly in Philadelphia's hands. The bottom of the seventh began with Eddie Collins being walked, and Home Run Baker singled, putting Collins on third. Then Harry Davis and Danny Murphy doubled, bringing home three runs in Collins, Baker, and Davis himself. Murphy went to third after Jack Barry sacrificed, Ira Thomas sent Murphy home. Amos Strunk doubled, and Thomas scored. Bris Lord hit a fly-out, but Jimmy Sheckard dropped the ball, and Strunk came home. Lord finally ended the inning when he was caught stealing second. The six-run rally left the score at 2–9. After the inning, Lew Richie came in for the struggling Mordecai Brown.

Heinie Zimmerman hit a double in the ninth inning, allowing Solly Hofman to score. The game ended 3–9, giving the Athletics a 2–0 lead in the series. The two teams left by train for Chicago that evening, in preparation for game three on Thursday.

Jack Coombs had pitched erratically, allowing eight hits and walking nine, but still picked up the win. The Cubs left 14 men on base, a Series record at that time. The A's combed Mordecai Brown for 13 hits. Eddie Collins was praised for his performance, which involved getting 3 hits out of four at-bats, scoring two runs and batting in another.

=== Game 3 ===
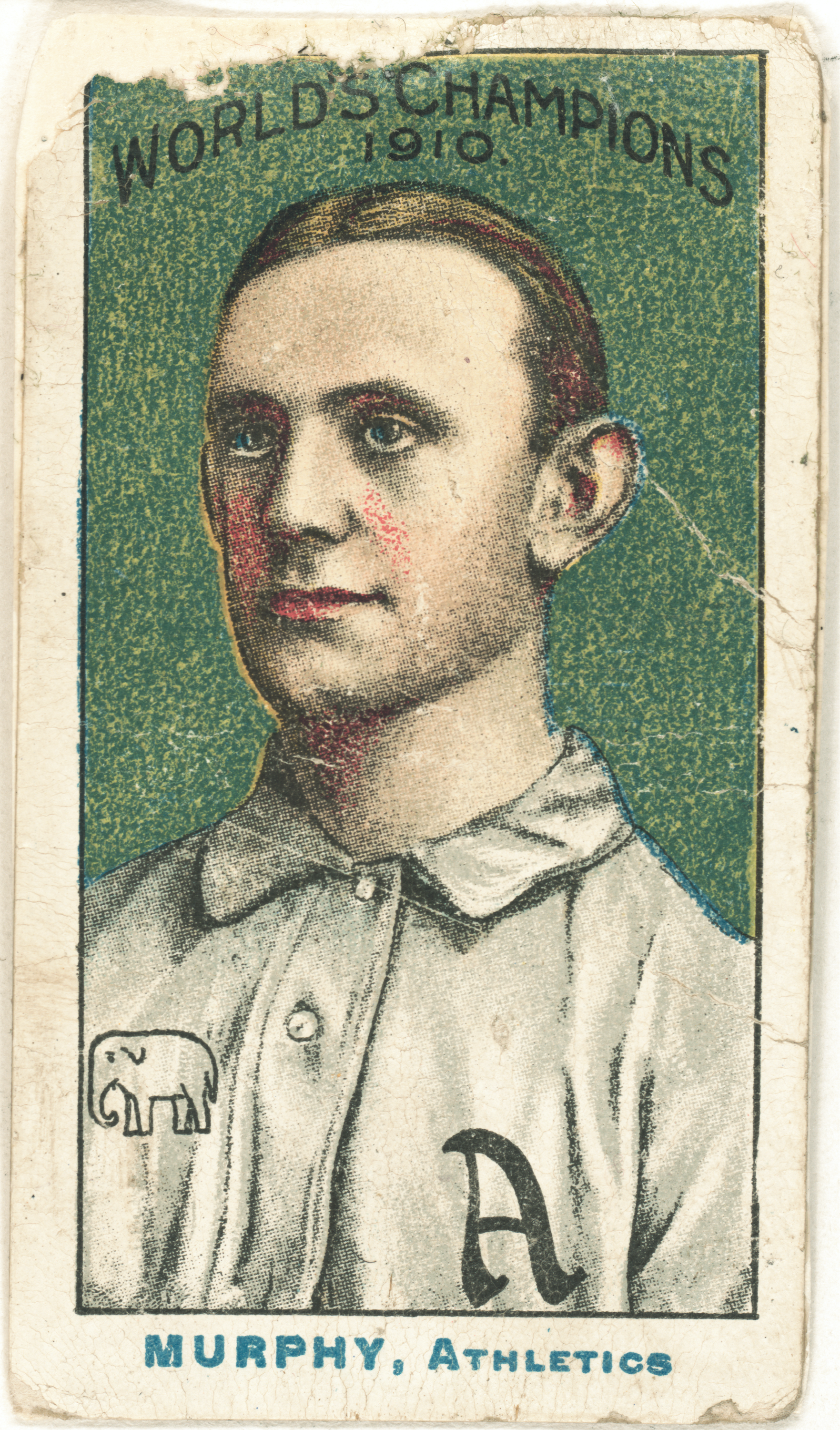
Danny Murphy hit a controversial three-run home run in the third inning.

Thursday, October 20, 1910 2:00 pm (CT) at West Side Park in Chicago, Illinois
Team	1	2	3	4	5	6	7	8	9	R	H	E
Philadelphia	1	2	5	0	0	0	4	0	0	12	16	0
Chicago	1	2	0	0	0	0	0	2	0	5	7	2
WP: Jack Coombs (2–0) LP: Harry McIntire (0–1); Home runs: PHA: Danny Murphy (1); CHC: None

Jack Coombs started again for Philadelphia, while Ed Reulbach was Chicago's starter. The game was played on a cold, cloudy day, and it drizzled during the second half of the match. An attendance of at least 30,000 fans had been expected by Chicago officials, but only 26,210 people showed up, though those who did stayed almost the entire game in spite of the home team's struggles.

The game got off to an exciting and even start. The first batter, Amos Strunk of the Athletics, was walked by starting pitcher Ed Reulbach. Bris Lord sacrificed, and Home Run Baker singled on a low curveball, putting the Athletics up 1–0. However, in Chicago's half of the inning, they matched the Athletics, as Solly Hofman sent Jimmy Sheckard home after Sheckard had advanced to third on Frank Schulte's double. Harry Davis scored for Philadelphia at the beginning of the second inning on a Jack Barry double, and Barry himself scored when pitcher Jack Coombs doubled once more. Chicago quickly matched this as well – Joe Tinker doubled, and Ginger Beaumont and Jimmy Sheckard walked, loading the bases. Frank Schulte doubled again to tie the game at 3.

Before the third inning, Reulbach was taken off, and Harry McIntire assumed his spot on the pitcher's mound for the Cubs. With one out and Eddie Collins on first, Home Run Baker hit a triple and put Philadelphia back in the lead. Harry Davis was hit by a pitch and went to first, and then Danny Murphy hit a three-run home run to right. This caused controversy as the Chicago players protested that the ball had not gone far enough and the hit should have counted as a double. Chicago's player-manager Frank Chance was ejected from the game, the second time in World Series history that a manager was punished in this way. McIntire was then taken off and replaced with Jack Pfiester. However, Pfiester's first pitch was hit for a double by Jack Barry, who scored when Ira Thomas hit to shortstop Joe Tinker. Tinker threw poorly to first base, allowing the Athletics to score their fifth run of the inning. A double play finally stemmed the bleeding, but the inning ended 8–3.

After this, Coombs settled into the form that had gained him a reputation as one of the best pitchers in the league. His breaking balls were unhittable, and Chicago were unable to get back into the game. The next few innings therefore passed uneventfully in the batting department, until the seventh inning. The inning started with two outs, and Harry Steinfeldt had the chance to finish it, but he fumbled Home Run Baker's hit and the Philadelphia player got to first. The bases were filled by Harry Davis and Danny Murphy, and Jack Barry hit his third double of the game to earn the Athletics two runs. The bases were loaded again when Ira Thomas was walked. Jack Coombs then hit a single to score two more runs, giving the pitcher three RBI, and making the score 12–3. Chicago scored twice in the eighth inning as a result of a passed ball. The game ended 12–5.

After Chicago's implosion, blame was assigned to the pitchers, who The Washington Times described as "absolute failures". Frank Chance even acknowledged that "Our pitchers haven't been able to stop the Philadelphia hitters." On the other side of the coin, the Athletics looked unstoppable. Ty Cobb predicted that they would sweep the series, and Connie Mack confidently pronounced that they would defeat the Cubs in game 4.

The Athletics rapped out 16 hits to Chicago's 7. Jack Coombs gave up 5 runs but won his second game of the series.

=== Game 4 ===
Saturday, October 22, 1910 2:00 pm (CT) at West Side Park in Chicago, Illinois
Team	1	2	3	4	5	6	7	8	9	10	R	H	E
Philadelphia	0	0	1	2	0	0	0	0	0	0	3	11	2
Chicago	1	0	0	1	0	0	0	0	1	1	4	10	1
WP: Mordecai Brown (1–1) LP: Chief Bender (1–1)

Chief Bender was chosen to start for Philadelphia, while King Cole was put out for Chicago as the last hope for the Cubs. Additionally, Jimmy Archer started as Chicago's catcher instead of Johnny Kling, as the Cubs believed that the Athletics had figured out Kling's signs. The game was planned to be held on Friday, but was postponed due to rain.

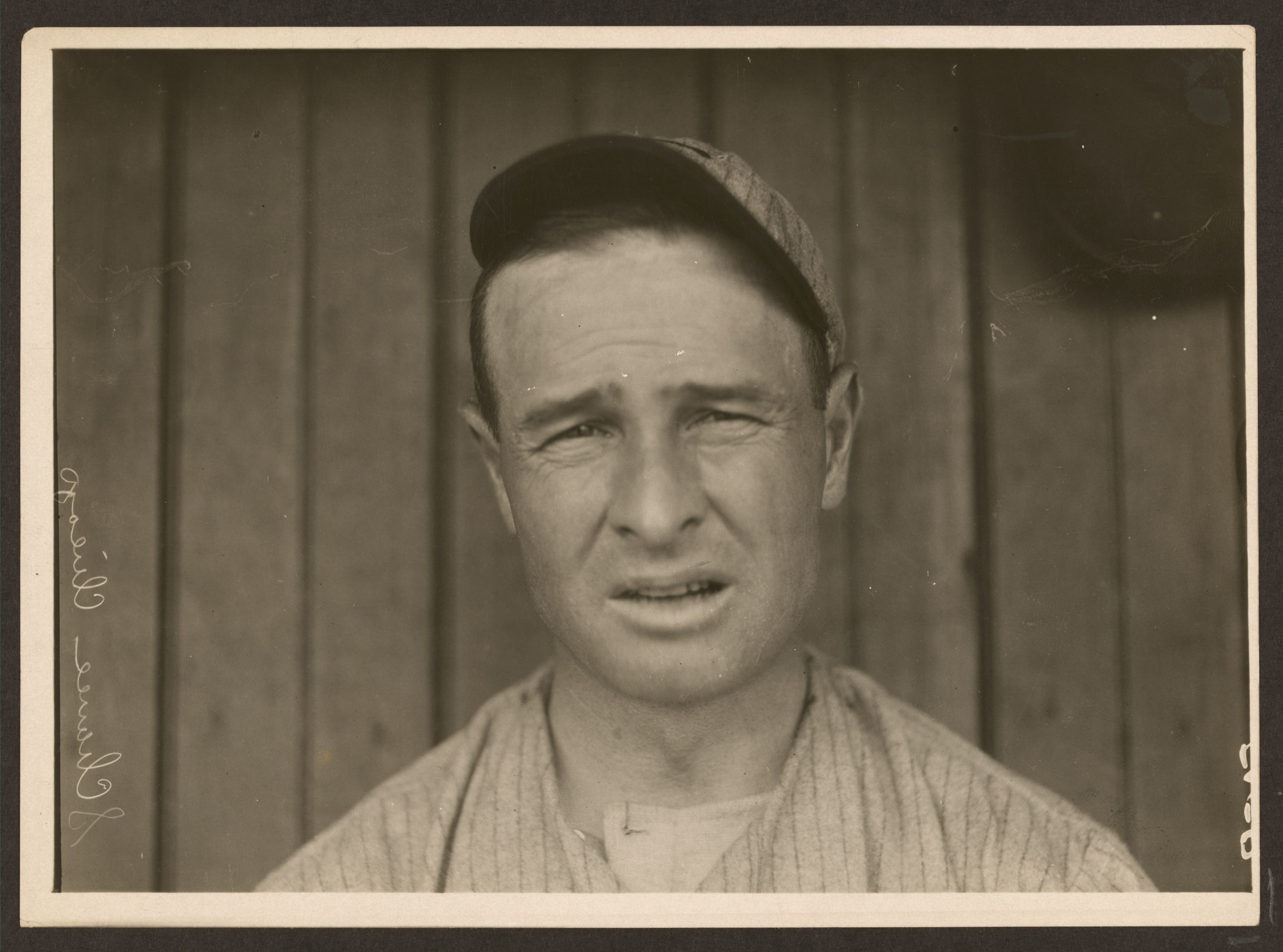
Frank Chance tripled in the bottom of the ninth, batting in the tying run and helping to keep Chicago in contention.

Chicago began the scoring in the bottom of the first. Jimmy Sheckard was walked and stole second, before being brought home by Solly Hofman. However, in the third inning, with two outs, Amos Strunk tripled and Chief Bender, who was on first having been walked, scored. Strunk accidentally slid past third base and was tagged out, but Bender was home before him, tying the game at 1.

In the fourth inning, Philadelphia had Eddie Collins on first when Home Run Baker doubled. Harry Davis struck out, but Danny Murphy doubled again and scored two runs for the Athletics. In the Cubs' half of the inning, Frank Schulte got to third after Solly Hofman's double. Frank Chance singled and Schulte went home, making it 3–2. Chicago had a good chance to re-tie the game, as there were no outs and they had men on first and second, but the Athletics took out Hofman and Heinie Zimmerman on a double play, and Harry Steinfeldt hit a fly ball, ending the fourth.

The next few innings passed with many close chances for the Athletics. In both the sixth and the eighth inning Home Run Baker was out at the plate. Chicago pinch hit Johnny Kling for King Cole in their half of the eighth inning, and put Mordecai Brown on the mound for the ninth.

In the bottom of the ninth, the Cubs were still behind 3–2, in serious danger of being swept. Frank Schulte doubled, and got to third when Hofman was tagged out bunting. Player-manager Frank Chance came up to bat with one out, and was hit by the first pitch on the finger, but the umpire ruled that he had walked into it. Then he tripled to center, tying the game. Although they now had a man on third, the next two Chicago players hit fly outs, and the game went into extra innings.

In the bottom of the tenth inning, with two outs, Jimmy Sheckard came up to bat. Jimmy Archer was on second, having doubled. Sheckard's single to center won the game for Chicago, 4–3; this was the first World Series game in history to end on a game-winning play.

=== Game 5 ===
Sunday, October 23, 1910 2:00 pm (CT) at West Side Park in Chicago, Illinois
Team	1	2	3	4	5	6	7	8	9	R	H	E
Philadelphia	1	0	0	0	1	0	0	5	0	7	9	1
Chicago	0	1	0	0	0	0	0	1	0	2	9	2
WP: Jack Coombs (3–0) LP: Mordecai Brown (1–2)

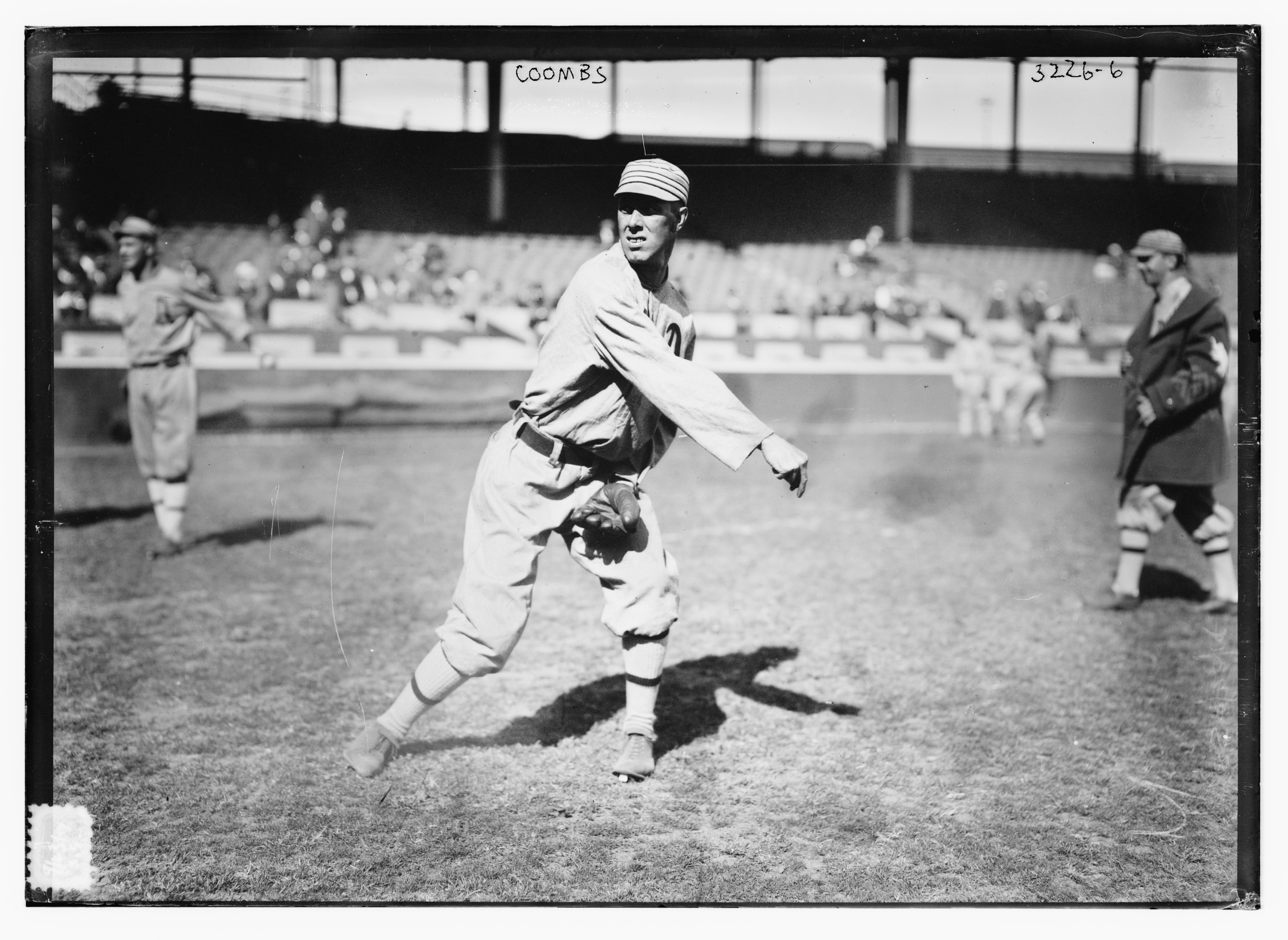
Jack Coombs started and won his third game in the World Series.

Jack Coombs started Game 5 for the Athletics, while Mordecai Brown was tasked with keeping the Cubs in contention. Further, Philadelphia manager Connie Mack opted to start Topsy Hartsel in left field, moving Bris Lord to center rather than Amos Strunk, and also switched catcher Ira Thomas with Jack Lapp. The game was played on a bright, sunny Sunday.

Topsy Hartsel began the game with a single and stole second while Bris Lord struck out. He scored after Eddie Collins hit a single to center. Philadelphia kept this 1–0 lead until the bottom of the second, when Frank Chance doubled. He made it to third base when Heinie Zimmerman bunted, and scored a tying run on Harry Steinfeldt's hit. The Cubs had another chance to score with the bases loaded and one out in the fourth inning, but Coombs struck out two straight Cubs batters. The Athletics capitalized on this, with Jack Lapp's fifth inning single allowing Danny Murphy to score from second base.

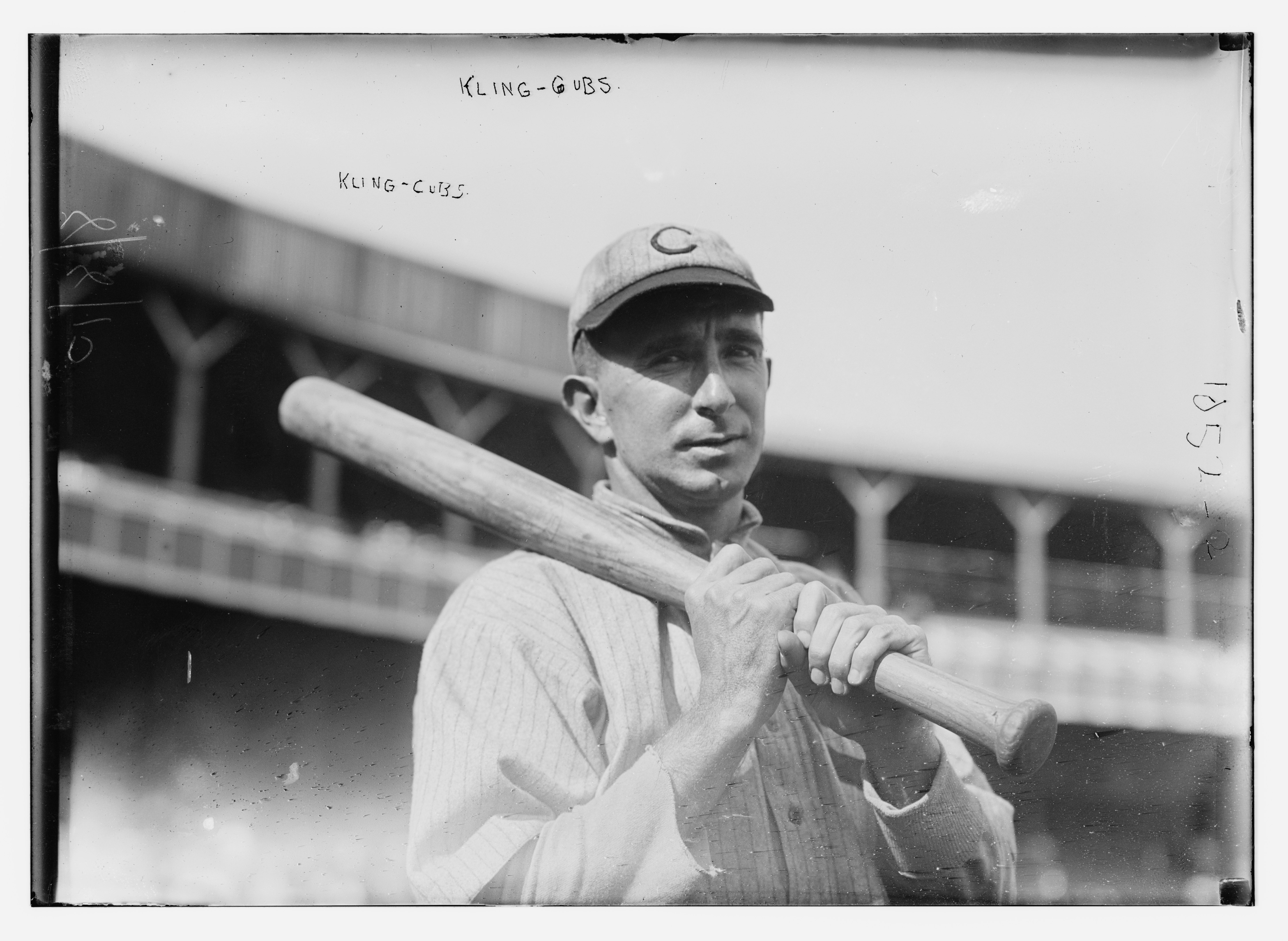
Johnny Kling grounded out to Jack Barry, ending the game.

The score was still 2–1 when the eighth inning began. With one out, Topsy Hartsel stole second, and was controversially called safe. Bris Lord doubled to right, giving the Athletics a run. Lord scored in turn after Eddie Collins doubled. Collins stole third and Home Run Baker singled, but the Cubs defense opted to force Collins out at the plate, allowing Baker to get to first. Harry Davis was walked – Mordecai Brown's first base on balls in Game 5 – and Danny Murphy tripled. His hit had blown past Heinie Zimmerman to center fielder Solly Hofman, scoring Baker, but Hofman's poor throw home allowed Davis to score as well. Murphy scored on a wild pitch. The Cubs scored a run in the bottom of the eighth when Frank Chance singled to send Jimmy Sheckard home. In the ninth inning, Harry Steinfeldt and Joe Tinker flew out. Jimmy Archer singled, and Johnny Kling emerged to pinch hit for the pitcher, as he did in Game 4. Kling grounded to shortstop Jack Barry, who ran to second base to force Archer out. The game ended 7–2.

Jack Coombs became the third pitcher in World Series history to win 3 games without a loss. (Note: Deacon Phillippe and Bill Dinneen both won 3 games at the 1903 World Series, but they both lost at least one game.) Babe Adams did it the year before, but in seven games, and Christy Mathewson accomplished the feat in the 1905 Series. This was the Athletics' first World Series title.

== Composite line score ==
1910 World Series (4–1): Philadelphia Athletics (A.L.) over Chicago Cubs (N.L.)

Team	1	2	3	4	5	6	7	8	9	10	R	H	E
Philadelphia Athletics	2	4	9	2	2	0	10	6	0	0	35	57	9
Chicago Cubs	3	3	0	1	0	0	1	3	3	1	15	37	9
Total attendance: 124,222 Average attendance: 24,844; Winning player's share: $2,063 Losing player's share: $1,375

== Firsts ==
- All nine players in the lineup for Philadelphia got a hit in Game 2, the first time in World Series history.
- Jimmy Archer became the first player in World Series history to appear in a World Series for both the National and American leagues when he took the field in Game 3 for Chicago. Archer played for the Tigers in the 1907 World Series.
- Philadelphia entered the series with ten days off compared to only one for Chicago – the largest disparity of rest days in World Series history.

== Sources ==
=== Bibliography ===
- Cohen, Richard M.; Neft, David S. (1990). The World Series: Complete Play-By-Play of Every Game, 1903–1989. New York: St. Martin's Press. pp. 32–35. ISBN 0-312-03960-3.
- Reichler, Joseph (1982). The Baseball Encyclopedia (5th ed.). Macmillan Publishing. p. 2118. ISBN 0-02-579010-2.
