= 1937 Baseball Hall of Fame balloting =

Elections to the Baseball Hall of Fame

National Baseball

Hall of Fame and Museum
- New inductees: 8
- via BBWAA: 3
- via Centennial Commission: 5
- Total inductees: 13
- Induction date: June 12, 1939

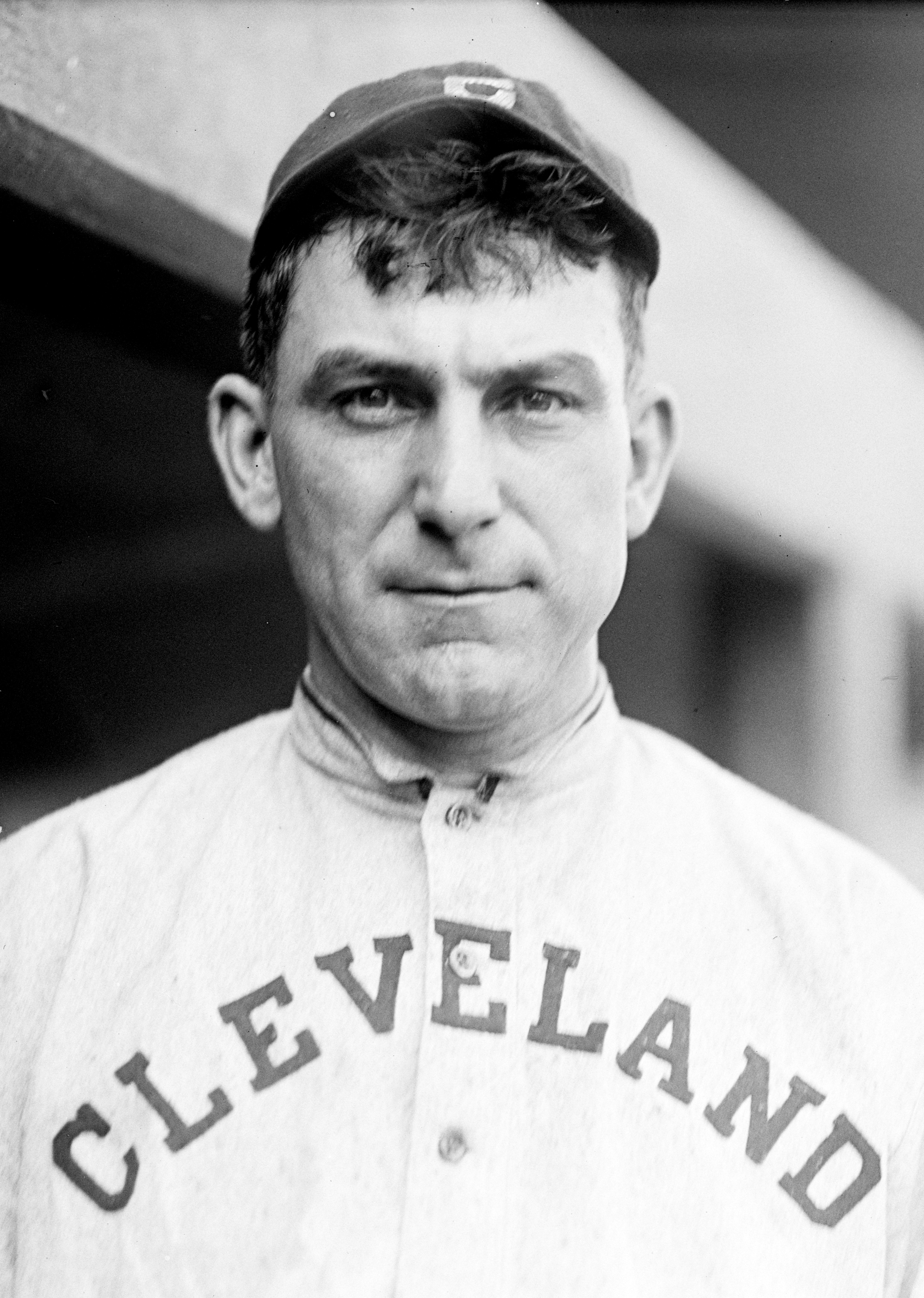
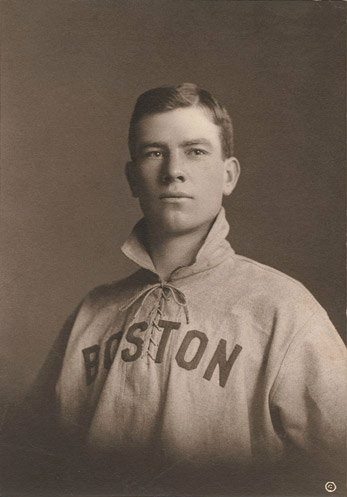
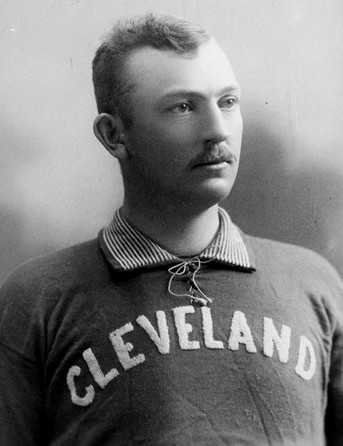
1937 BBWAA inductees (L-R): Nap Lajoie, Tris Speaker, and Cy Young

The 1937 process of selecting inductees to the Baseball Hall of Fame was markedly different from the initial elections the previous year. As only half of the initial goal of 10 inductees had been selected in 1936, members of the Baseball Writers' Association of America (BBWAA) were once again given authority to select any players active in the 20th century; but the unsuccessful 1936 Veterans Committee election for 19th-century players led to a smaller Centennial Commission choosing a handful of inductees whose contributions were largely as non-players.

In the BBWAA election, voters were again instructed to cast votes for 10 candidates, but were now discouraged from casting votes for active players, although some player-managers whose playing days were largely over, such as Rogers Hornsby, received votes. Any candidate receiving votes on at least 75% of the ballots would be honored with induction to the Hall upon its opening in the sport's supposed centennial year of 1939. Again, individuals who had been barred from baseball were not formally ineligible; Hal Chase received some votes, although Shoeless Joe Jackson did not. Balloting by the BBWAA resulted in the election of three players: Nap Lajoie, Tris Speaker, and Cy Young.

== BBWAA vote ==
A total of 201 ballots were cast, with 1,949 individual votes for 113 specific candidates, an average of 9.70 per ballot; 151 votes were required for election. Selections were announced on January 19, 1937. The three candidates who received at least 75% of the vote and were elected are indicated in bold italics; candidates who have since been selected in subsequent elections are indicated in italics.

Player	Votes	Percent	Change
**Nap Lajoie**	168	83.6	▲19.0%
**Tris Speaker**	165	82.1	▲23.3%
**Cy Young**	153	76.1	▲27.0%
Grover Cleveland Alexander	125	62.2	▲37.9%
Eddie Collins	115	57.2	▲30.7%
Willie Keeler	115	57.2	▲39.5%
George Sisler	106	52.7	▲18.6%
Ed Delahanty	70	34.8	▲27.3%
Rube Waddell	67	33.3	▲18.7%
Jimmy Collins	60	29.9	▲4.2%
Ed Walsh	56	27.9	▲19.1%
Rogers Hornsby	53	26.4	▼20.1%
Frank Chance	49	24.4	▲22.2%
Johnny Evers	44	21.9	▲19.2%
Roger Bresnahan	43	21.4	▲0.6%
John McGraw	35	17.4	▲15.6%
Mordecai Brown	31	15.4	▲12.7%
Rabbit Maranville	25	12.4	-
Ray Schalk	24	11.9	▲10.1%
Eddie Plank	23	11.4	-
Fred Clarke	22	10.9	▲10.5%
Johnny Kling	20	10.0	▲6.5%
Hal Chase	18	9.0	▲4.1%
Chief Bender	17	8.5	▲7.6%
Lou Criger	16	8.0	▲4.9%
Ross Youngs	16	8.0	▲3.6%
Herb Pennock	15	7.5	-
Joe Tinker	15	7.5	-
Frank Baker	13	6.5	▲6.1%
Rube Marquard	13	6.5	▲6.1%
Smoky Joe Wood	13	6.5	-
Joe McGinnity	12	6.0	-
Addie Joss	11	5.5	-
Nap Rucker	11	5.5	▲5.1%
Harry Heilmann	10	5.0	-
Edd Roush	10	5.0	▲4.1%
Dazzy Vance	10	5.0	▲4.6%
Babe Adams	8	4.0	-
Hugh Duffy	7	3.5	▼1.0%
Jimmy Archer	6	3.0	-
Max Carey	6	3.0	-
Mike Donlin	6	3.0	-
Harry Hooper	6	3.0	-
Bill Bradley	5	2.5	▲2.1%
Bill Carrigan	5	2.5	-
Sam Crawford	5	2.5	▲2.1%
Miller Huggins	5	2.5	-
Wilbert Robinson	5	2.5	-
Fred Tenney	5	2.5	-
Zack Wheat	5	2.5	-
Earle Combs	4	2.0	-
Clark Griffith	4	2.0	-
Hughie Jennings	4	2.0	-
Nick Altrock	3	1.5	-
Dave Bancroft	3	1.5	-
George Burns	3	1.5	-
Wild Bill Donovan	3	1.5	-
Red Faber	3	1.5	-
Duffy Lewis	3	1.5	-
Art Nehf	3	1.5	-
Roger Peckinpaugh	3	1.5	-
Marty Bergen	2	1.0	-
Ping Bodie	2	1.0	-
Jack Coombs	2	1.0	-
Gavvy Cravath	2	1.0	-
Jake Daubert	2	1.0	-
Larry Doyle	2	1.0	-
Art Fletcher	2	1.0	-
Hank Gowdy	2	1.0	-
Hans Lobert	2	1.0	-
Sherry Magee	2	1.0	-
Ossee Schreckengost	2	1.0	-
Everett Scott	2	1.0	-
Ted Breitenstein	1	0.5	-
Jesse Burkett	1	0.5	-
Donie Bush	1	0.5	-
Jack Chesbro	1	0.5	-
Bill Cissell	1	0.5	-
Shano Collins	1	0.5	-
Red Dooin	1	0.5	-
Joe Dugan	1	0.5	-
Kid Elberfeld	1	0.5	▲0.1%
Cy Falkenberg	1	0.5	-
Kid Gleason	1	0.5	-
Burleigh Grimes	1	0.5	-
Heinie Groh	1	0.5	-
Bill Hinchman	1	0.5	-
Joe Judge	1	0.5	-
Dickey Kerr	1	0.5	-
Tommy Leach	1	0.5	-
Sam Leever	1	0.5	-
Herman Long	1	0.5	-
Dolf Luque	1	0.5	-
Stuffy McInnis	1	0.5	-
Larry McLean	1	0.5	-
Bob Meusel	1	0.5	-
Hack Miller	1	0.5	-
Pat Moran	1	0.5	-
Danny Murphy	1	0.5	-
Red Murray	1	0.5	-
Dode Paskert	1	0.5	-
Bugs Raymond	1	0.5	-
Eppa Rixey	1	0.5	-
Dick Rudolph	1	0.5	-
Amos Rusie	1	0.5	-
Frank Schulte	1	0.5	-
Joe Sewell	1	0.5	-
Harry Steinfeldt	1	0.5	-
Gabby Street	1	0.5	-
Billy Sullivan	1	0.5	▲0.5%
Bobby Veach	1	0.5	-
Bobby Wallace	1	0.5	-
Hack Wilson	1	0.5	-

Key to colors
Elected to the Hall. These individuals are also indicated in **bold italics**.
Players who were elected in future elections. These individuals are also indicated in plain italics.

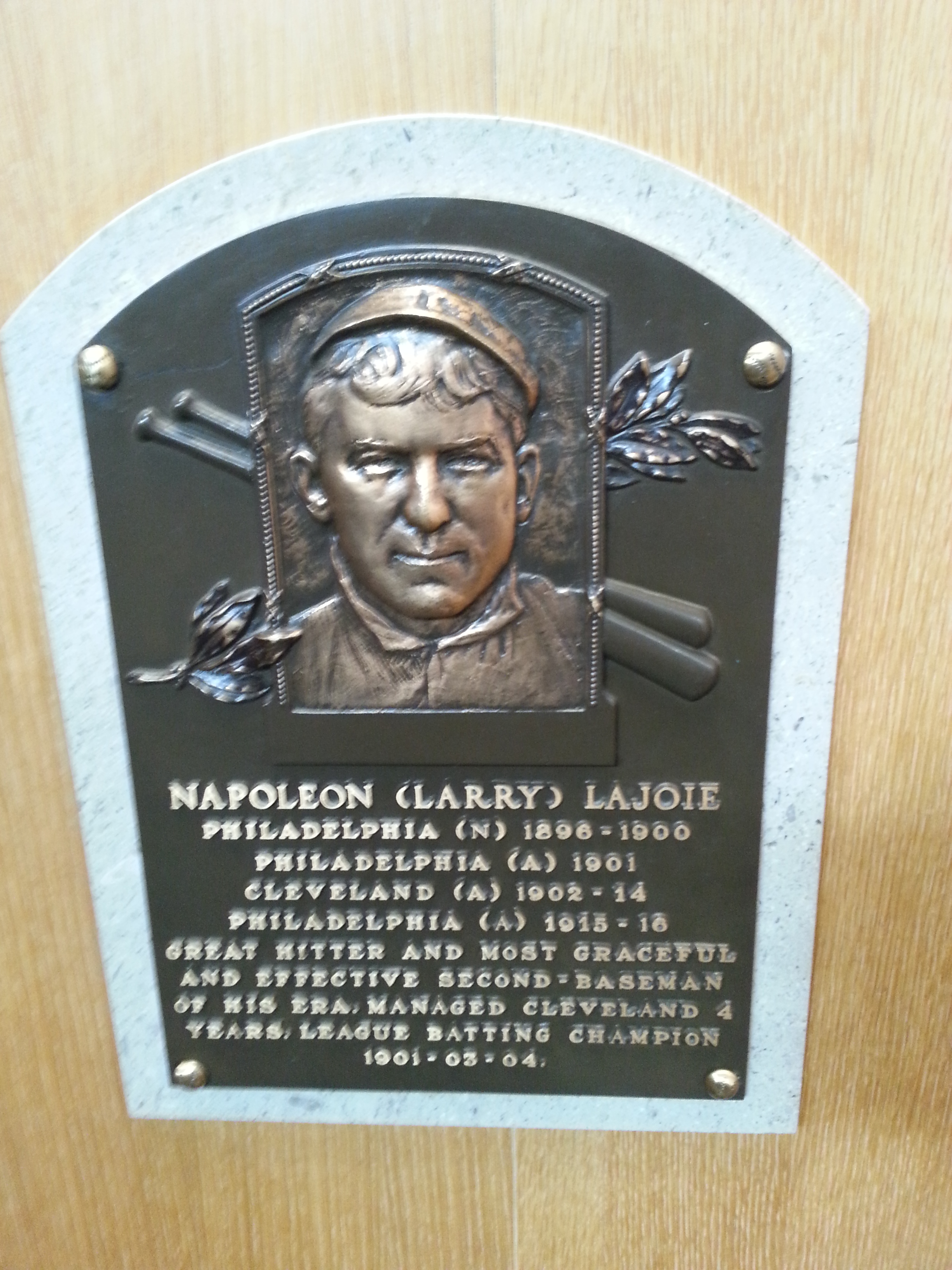
Lajoie's plaque in Cooperstown

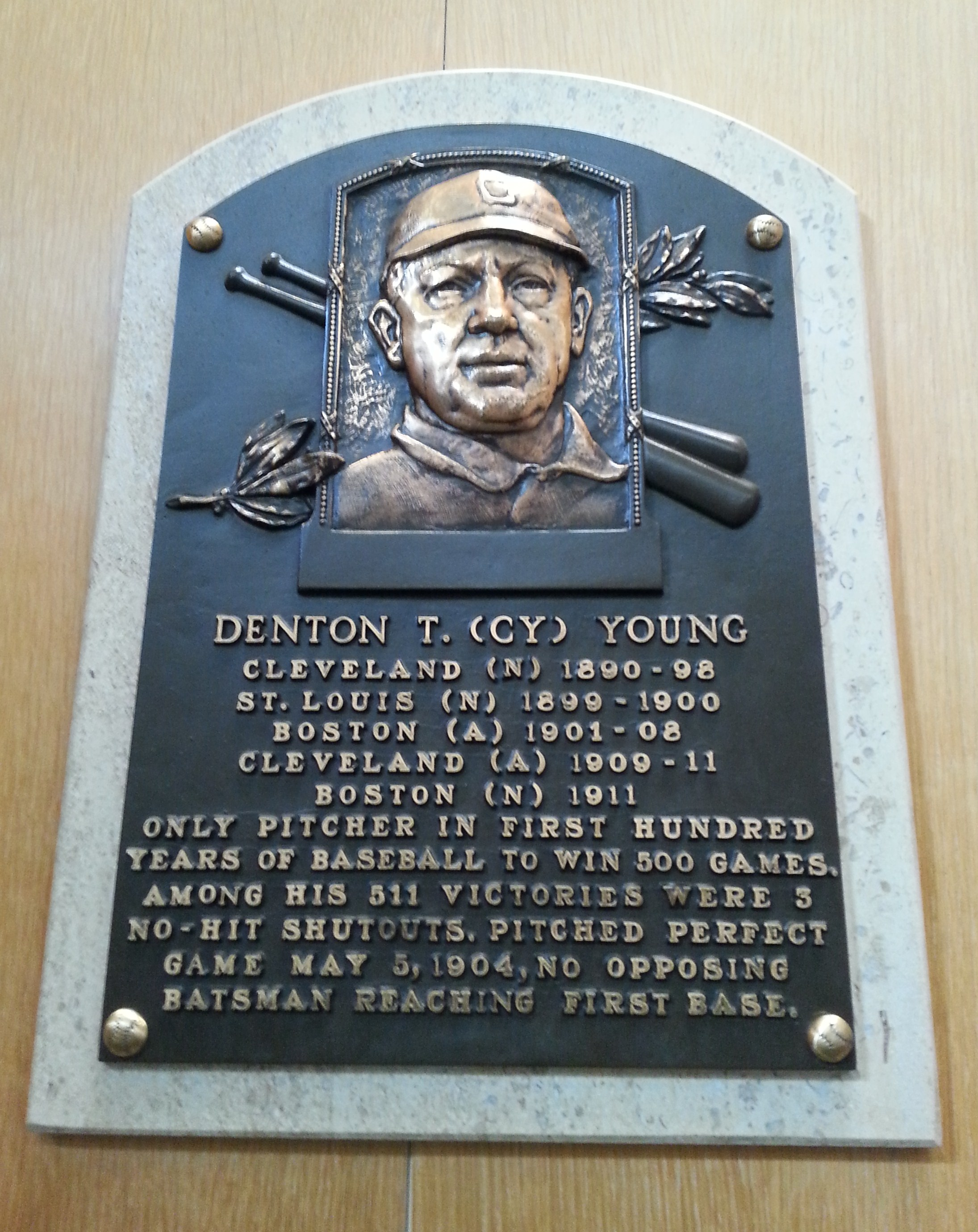
Young's plaque in Cooperstown

== Centennial Commission ==
After the error-ridden 1936 Veterans election failed to select any 19th-century players, the Hall opted in 1937 to have a small committee select inductees "for outstanding service to base ball apart from playing the game." The Commission's members were: Commissioner Kenesaw Mountain Landis; National League president Ford Frick; American League president Will Harridge; Judge William G. Bramham, president of the National Association of Professional Baseball Leagues (the minor league overseeing body); former NL president John Heydler; and George Trautman, president of the minor league American Association and chairman of the National Association's executive committee. At the December 1937 major league winter meetings in Chicago, Frick announced that the Commission had elected five people. The selections were:

- Connie Mack and John McGraw, who had both played in the 1890s and had gone on to be the winningest managers in their respective leagues – Mack with nine American League pennants and five World Series titles, and McGraw with ten National League pennants and three World Series titles;
- Morgan Bulkeley, the NL's first president (1876), and Byron "Ban" Johnson, the AL's founder and first president (1900–1927); and
- George Wright, who formed baseball's first professional team in 1869 and became the game's first outstanding shortstop. He was also a successful manager and led a number of global barnstorming tours.

Of the five selectees, only Mack was still living when the selections were made.
