= Cy Young's perfect game =

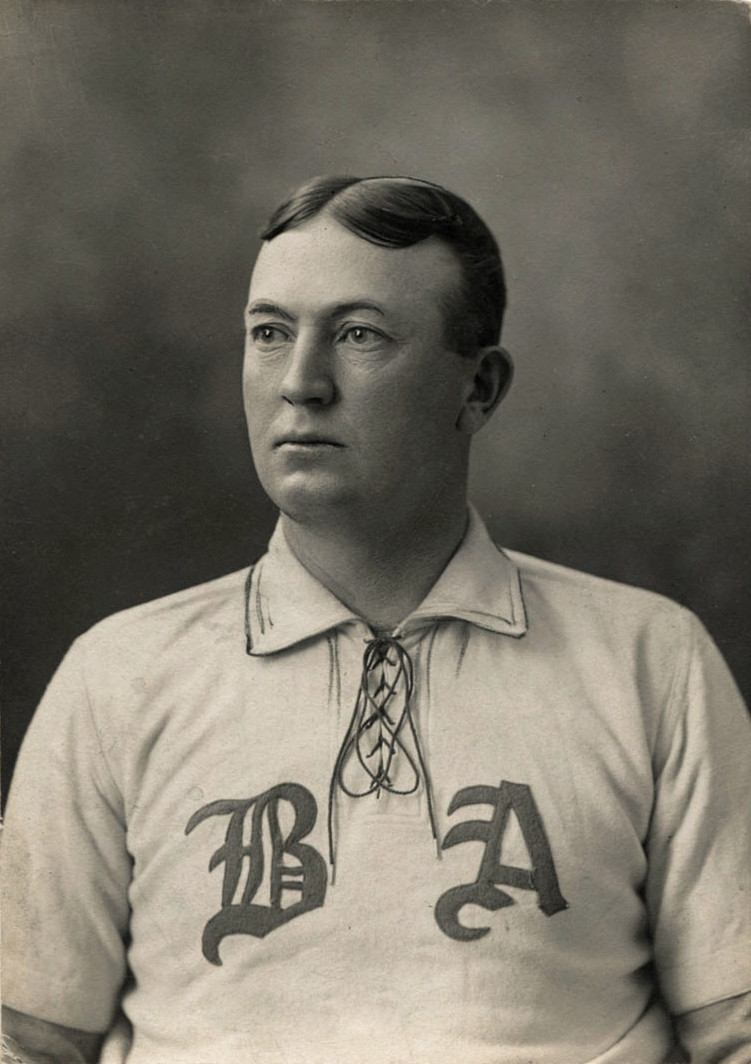
- Cy Young in 1902
Philadelphia Athletics	Boston Americans
0	3
	1	2	3	4	5	6	7	8	9	R	H	E
Philadelphia Athletics	0	0	0	0	0	0	0	0	0	0	0	1
Boston Americans	0	0	0	0	0	1	2	0	X	3	10	0
- Date: May 5, 1904
- Venue: Huntington Avenue Grounds
- City: Boston, Massachusetts
- Managers: Connie Mack (Philadelphia Athletics); Jimmy Collins (Boston Americans)
- Umpires: Frank Dwyer
- Attendance: 10,267

On May 5, 1904, Cy Young of the Boston Americans pitched a perfect game against the Philadelphia Athletics at Huntington Avenue Grounds. It was the third perfect game in Major League Baseball (MLB) history, and the first perfect game to be thrown under current-day rules that were established in 1903. As a result, some baseball historians regard Young's perfect game as the first true perfect game in MLB history. It was the first MLB perfect game since John Montgomery Ward threw one in 1880.

Young and his opponent Rube Waddell were two of the best pitchers in the league, and a large portion of the 10,267 people who attended the game specifically came to watch the duel between the two. Of the 27 batters Young faced, the at bats that posed the greatest threat were Monte Cross' at bat in the third inning and Ollie Pickering's at bat in the seventh inning. Cross hit a pop-up into shallow right field that forced right fielder Buck Freeman to make a running catch. Pickering softly hit a ground ball to shortstop Freddy Parent, who charged the ball and threw out Pickering by less than a step.

Once the final out was recorded, fans in attendance ran onto the field to congratulate Young on his accomplishment. As the concept of a perfect game did not exist at the time, sports writers gave differing perspectives on the game. From April 25 to May 17, Young had a streak of 45 consecutive scoreless innings, which included his perfect game. During his scoreless inning streak, Young also pitched 25 1/3 consecutive innings without allowing a hit, which remains the MLB record. Young was inducted into the National Baseball Hall of Fame in 1937 and is often regarded as one of the best, if not the best pitcher in MLB history.

== The game ==
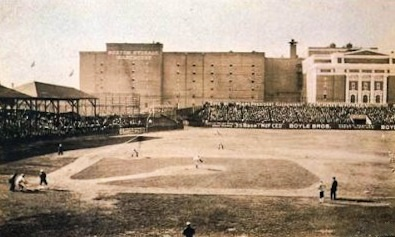
Huntington Avenue Grounds, the site of Young's perfect game

Young's perfect game occurred on May 5, 1904. The Americans were playing the Philadelphia Athletics at Huntington Avenue Grounds in Boston, Massachusetts. 10,267 people attended the game, which at the time, was the largest regular-season attendance in the stadium's history. Many of the fans specifically came to watch the duel between Young and Athletics pitcher Rube Waddell, two of the best pitchers in the league. In 1904, Waddell recorded 349 strikeouts, which stood as the single-season MLB record until 1965 when Sandy Koufax recorded 382 strikeouts. On May 2, Waddell faced Americans pitcher Jesse Tannehill and threw a shutout, and a newspaper article written before the May 5 game claimed Waddell said he would, "give the same to [Young] as I gave to Tannehill".

Young was excellent through the first two innings, striking out three of the first six batters. The first batter of the third inning, shortstop Monte Cross, hit a pop-up into shallow right field that nearly dropped for a hit. Right fielder Buck Freeman came "tearing in from right like a deer" to catch the ball, according to Young. In the fourth, first baseman Harry Davis hit a foul ball pop-up that was caught by catcher Lou Criger before he nearly collided with the Boston dugout. Fans began to cheer louder from the fifth inning onward whenever Young pitched. However, as baseball historians Glenn Stout and Richard Johnson note, the concept of a perfect game did not exist in 1904, and while the concept of a no-hitter did exist, they were not as widely celebrated. Thus, Stout and Johnson speculate fans were instead simply engrossed in the duel between Young and Waddell.

Through five innings, the game remained scoreless. In the bottom of the sixth inning, Americans center fielder Chick Stahl hit a triple, and Freeman followed with another triple to drive in the first run of the game. Freeman would later be tagged out trying to score on a sacrifice fly. In the top of the seventh inning, Athletics center fielder Ollie Pickering hit what baseball writer Ronald Mayer described as "the final scare for the day". Pickering softly hit a ground ball to shortstop Freddy Parent, who charged the ball and threw out Pickering by less than a step. The Americans scored two more runs in the bottom of the seventh inning, and by the top of the ninth inning, the score was 3–0. Young began the ninth inning with a strikeout of Cross, and induced a ground out from catcher Ossee Schreckengost. The final batter of the game was Waddell. Some fans yelled for Athletics manager Connie Mack to bring in a pinch hitter for Waddell, but no such action was taken. Waddell hit a fly ball which was caught by Stahl for the final out. Stahl later recounted, "I thought that ball would never come down." Young gave a similar remark, and said, "Never did a ball seem so slow in dropping." The game lasted 1 hour and 23 minutes. Young struck out 8 batters.

== Aftermath ==
After the final out was recorded, fans in attendance ran onto the field to congratulate Young and celebrate his accomplishment. A writer from The Boston Post stated, "as [the ball] dropped into Stahl's glove, a roar as if a hundred cannon had belched forth rocked the stands and bleachers; staid professional and business men fell over each other to congratulate Young and the Boston players." It was not until a fan handed Young a five-dollar bill (worth $182.01 in 2025 dollars) that he realized how incredible his performance was. Since the concept of a perfect game did not exist in 1904, sports writers gave differing perspectives on the game. The headline for The Boston Daily Globe read, "Athletics Lose in Unique Game". The New York Times offered similar commentary, and stated, "Not one of the Philadelphians made a run, a hit, or reached first base in to-day's game by reason of Young's superb pitching."

From April 25 to May 17, Young had a streak of 45 consecutive scoreless innings, which included his perfect game. This set an MLB record for the longest scoreless inning streak (which has since been broken multiple times). During his streak of scoreless innings, Young also pitched 24 consecutive innings without allowing a hit, which remains the MLB record. Young played for eight more seasons, although Mayer regards 1904 as the pinnacle of Young's career, as his control began to worsen with age. Young's career statistics included 511 wins, 749 complete games, 7,356 innings pitched, 2,803 strikeouts, a lifetime ERA of 2.63, and three no-hitters including this perfect game. He holds MLB records for the most career wins, games started, innings pitched, and complete games. He was inducted into the National Baseball Hall of Fame in 1937, and is often regarded as one of the best, if not the best pitcher in MLB history. A year after his death in 1955, MLB introduced the Cy Young Award, which is awarded annually to the best pitcher in the American League (AL) and the National League (NL).

Although Lee Richmond and John Montgomery Ward threw perfect games in 1880, Young's was the first to be played under rules roughly equivalent to the modern game, as the rules of baseball were significantly different in the 19th century. For example, pitchers could not throw pitches above their shoulder, which often necessitated an underhanded approach to pitching. There was no pitcher's mound, so pitcher's threw from a flat surface only forty-five feet from the batter as opposed to sixty feet. Additionally, batters could request where they wanted a pitch to be thrown, and if the pitch did not land in the spot the batter requested, it would be called a ball. In 1903, the AL and NL agreed to play under a new ruleset, which is still in use today. Thus, historians generally mark this period as the start of MLB's modern era, and often categorize statistics prior to the 20th century separately. Although MLB.com does include Richmond and Ward in their list of MLB perfect games, some sportswriters exclude them, and instead describe their perfect games as pioneering accomplishments.

== Game statistics ==
May 5, Huntington Avenue Grounds, Boston, Massachusetts

Team	1	2	3	4	5	6	7	8	9	R	H	E
Philadelphia	0	0	0	0	0	0	0	0	0	0	0	1
Boston	0	0	0	0	0	1	2	0	–	3	10	0
WP: Cy Young (2–2) LP: Rube Waddell (4–1)

=== Box score ===
Philadelphia box score
Player	AB	R	H	RBI
Topsy Hartsel, LF	1	0	0	0
Danny Hoffman, LF	2	0	0	0
Ollie Pickering, CF	3	0	0	0
Harry Davis, 1B	3	0	0	0
Lave Cross, 3B	3	0	0	0
Socks Seybold, RF	3	0	0	0
Danny Murphy, 2B	3	0	0	0
Monte Cross, SS	3	0	0	0
Ossee Schreckengost, C	3	0	0	0
Rube Waddell, P	3	0	0	0
Totals	27	0	0	0

Philadelphia	IP	H	R	ER	SO
Rube Waddell (L, 4–1)	8	10	3	3	6
Totals	8	10	3	3	6

Boston box score
Player	AB	R	H	RBI
Patsy Dougherty, LF	4	0	1	0
Jimmy Collins, 3B	4	0	2	0
Chick Stahl, CF	4	1	1	0
Buck Freeman, RF	4	0	1	1
Freddy Parent, SS	4	0	2	0
Candy LaChance, 1B	3	0	1	0
Hobe Ferris, 2B	3	1	1	0
Lou Criger, C	3	1	1	1
Cy Young, P	3	0	0	0
Totals	32	3	10	2

Boston	IP	H	R	ER	SO
Cy Young (W, 2-2)	9	0	0	0	8
Totals	9	0	0	0	8
