= Gilmore, Ohio =

Unincorporated community in Ohio, U.S.

Coordinates: 40°17′27″N 81°26′25″W

Gilmore is an unincorporated community in Washington Township, Tuscarawas County, Ohio, south of the village of Gnadenhutten. Gilmore sits on Tuscarawas County Road 10 (Gilmore Road) and is intersected by Tuscarawas County Road 14 (River Hill and Fallen Timber Roads) at Gilmore's square.

== History ==
Gilmore was platted in 1848. The community has the name of Nathaniel Gilmore, a pioneer settler. A post office called Gilmore was established in 1854, and remained in operation until 1950.

== Notable person ==
Gilmore is the birthplace of legendary baseball Hall of Fame pitcher Cy Young, for whom the Cy Young Award was named.
