= Lou Criger =

American baseball player (1872–1934)

- Catcher
- Born: February 3, 1872; Elkhart, Indiana, U.S.
- Died: May 14, 1934 (aged 62); Tucson, Arizona, U.S.
- Batted: Right Threw: Right

MLB debut
- September 21, 1896, for the Cleveland Spiders

Last MLB appearance
- June 3, 1912, for the St. Louis Browns

MLB statistics
- Batting average: .221
- Home runs: 11
- Runs batted in: 342
- Stats at Baseball Reference

Teams
- Cleveland Spiders (1896–1898); St. Louis Perfectos / Cardinals (1899–1900); Boston Americans / Red Sox (1901–1908); St. Louis Browns (1909); New York Highlanders (1910); St. Louis Browns (1912)

Career highlights and awards
- World Series champion (1903)

Louis Criger (February 3, 1872 – May 14, 1934) was an American professional baseball catcher. He played in Major League Baseball (MLB) from 1896 to 1912 for the Cleveland Spiders, St. Louis Perfectos / Cardinals, Boston Americans / Red Sox, St. Louis Browns and New York Highlanders. Listed at 5 feet 10 inches (1.78 m) and 165 pounds (75 kg), he batted and threw right-handed.

== Biography ==
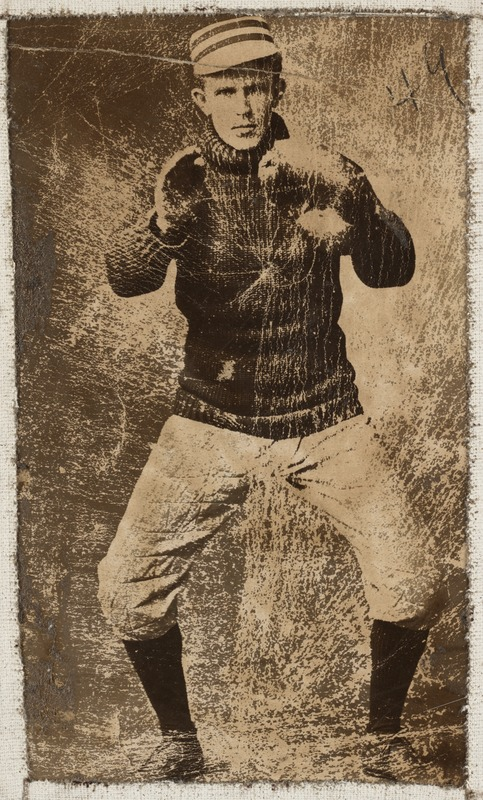
Boston Americans catcher Lou Criger, 1901. Michael T. "Nuf Ced" McGreevy Collection, Boston Public Library

Criger began his major league career with two games for the Cleveland Spiders of the National League in 1896. At the time, Cy Young was a pitcher for the Spiders; Young and Criger would remain teammates through 1908. During the 1897–1908 seasons, Young won 284 games, with Criger catching many of them. After playing for Cleveland through 1898, Criger and Young played in St. Louis in 1899 and 1900, then moved to the new American League franchise in Boston in 1901. Criger was the first Opening Day catcher in the team's history. In the first modern World Series in 1903, he caught every inning of every game for Boston, helping his team win the championship. Criger was also the catcher for Cy Young's perfect game, the first perfect game in American League history, on May 5, 1904. Criger and Young remained with Boston through the 1908 season, the first year of the team being known as the Red Sox. Criger then spent the 1909 season with the St. Louis Browns and the 1910 season with the New York Highlanders; he finished his major league career with a single game for the Browns in 1912.

In a 16-season major league career, Criger batted .221—collecting 709 hits in 3202 at bats—with 11 home runs and 342 RBIs. He had 58 stolen bases and scored 337 runs. Although never a major star, Criger received votes for the Baseball Hall of Fame in four years of balloting (1936–1939). He garnered a high of eight percent of the vote, being named on 16 of 201 ballots, in the 1937 balloting.

Criger served as coach of the Notre Dame Fighting Irish baseball team in early 1907, until he had to report to Boston's spring training in mid-March. Born in February 1872 in Indiana, Criger died in May 1934 in Tucson, Arizona; he was survived by his wife, one daughter, and five sons. In the very first 1936 Baseball Hall of Fame balloting, he received seven votes (3.1 percent), 29th among the 50 players put up to a vote, which actually was ahead of numerous future Hall of Fame players (he later appeared on five further votes until 1946, peaking at eight percent in 1937).
