= William G. Bramham =

American lawyer (1874–1947)

William Gibbons Bramham
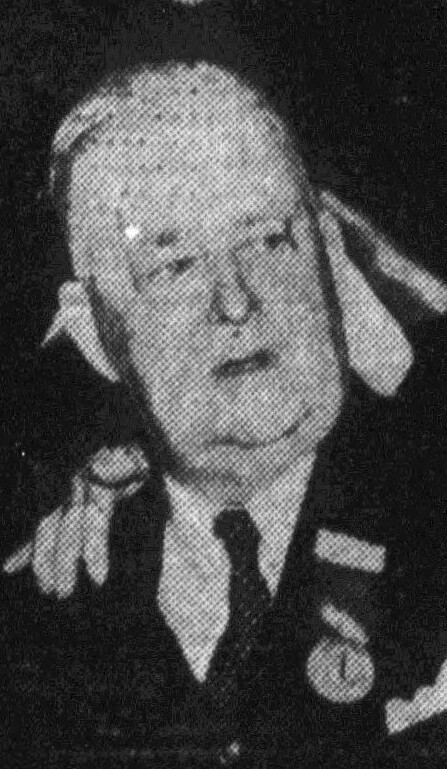
- Born: July 13, 1874; Hopkinsville, Kentucky, U.S.
- Died: July 8, 1947 (aged 72); Durham, North Carolina, U.S.
- Education: University of North Carolina
- Occupations: Minor League Baseball executive * North Carolina State League president (1916–1917) * Piedmont League president (1920–1932) * South Atlantic League president (1924–1930) * Virginia League president (1925–1928) * Eastern Carolina League president (1928–1929) * National Association of Professional Baseball Leagues president (1933–1946)
- Years active: 1902–1946

William Gibbons Bramham (July 13, 1874 – July 8, 1947) was an American baseball executive, lawyer and politician, whose most significant role was as president of the National Association of Professional Baseball Leagues from 1933 through 1946. Bramham was one of the judges for the Baseball Hall of Fame’s Centennial Commission in 1937.

Judge Bramham carried his judicial title during four different decades in baseball despite never having sat upon a bench. His law school classmates bestowed it to honor his dignified manner, a demeanor that had undoubtedly served him well in baseball circles. In between, Bramham was a member of the Republican Party, serving as a delegate to the Republican National Convention from North Carolina in 1924, 1928, and 1932, and assuming the position of Republican State Chair in 1925.

== Early life and career ==
Born in Hopkinsville, Kentucky, Bramham was the second of six siblings born to James Goss Bramham and Rosa Mason Cooke. Bramham graduated from University of North Carolina and was admitted as a lawyer in Durham, North Carolina before showing his interest in baseball, as he helped stabilize the ballgame in the state in 1902 and was largely responsible for the creation of the Durham Tobacconists club, precursor to the legendary Durham Bulls.

After that, Bramham presided over the North Carolina State League from 1916 to 1917; the Piedmont League, from its inception in 1920 until 1932; the South Atlantic League from 1924 through 1930; the Virginia League from 1925 to 1928, and the Eastern Carolina League in 1928 and 1929.

During this time, Bramham accumulated enough experience as organizer and was well-versed in factors caused by the Great Depression, which led him to create stability in the National Association of Professional Baseball Leagues, now known as Minor League Baseball, the governing body for all professional baseball teams in the United States, Canada, Mexico and the Caribbean that are affiliated with Major League Baseball through their farm systems.

After the historical Wall Street Crash of 1929, only 25 minor league circuits were able to finish the regular season that year. That number dwindled to 21 in 1930 and 16 in 1932. From there, the administrative duties were put in the hands of an executive committee for a period of one year, with orders to survey conditions and report back with recommendations and specific requests for changes.

== Presidency of NAPBL ==
At the Winter Meetings of 1932, Bramham was appointed as the third president of the NAPBL. Bramham treated it as a great opportunity, instead of a misfortune, and provided the strong leadership that the baseball industry needed to survive and eventually prosper in the 1930s, despite the turbulent financial times.

The NAPBL office had been in Auburn, New York, since the organization was founded in 1901, but Bramham moved them to Durham, North Carolina, where he had a thriving law practice and was active in statewide Republican politics. Only five leagues committed to operate in 1933, but 14 actually opened and finished the season. As a result, Bramham soon found out that he had a full-time job and gave up his law business to devote all his energy to the organization during 14 years. That started an upward trend for the NAPBL guided by Bramham, which reached a peak of 43 leagues just prior to the start of World War II, as he inherited 14 leagues and 102 clubs, but turned over 52 leagues and 388 clubs to his successor George Trautman in 1947.

=== Reforms ===
One of the most significant reforms instituted by Bramham during these years was designed to eliminate the so-called "shoestring operators", who often did not have the financial support to survive a full season. Bramham insisted that new owners show moral integrity and back up their operations with guaranty deposits, and he rigidly held all NAPBL clubs to this standard. This led to improved stability and sounder policies, making it easier to bring in new investors.

Bramham also was a strong backer of his umpires, protecting them from physical and verbal attacks from both uniformed and non-uniformed personnel. Among other of his ideas, he implemented by the mid-1930s a school of instruction for club business managers, and displays of promotional ideas at the Winter Meetings.

=== World War II ===
After that Bramham faced an even bigger hurdle, as was the start of World War II conflict. This not only drained the game of achievements, as ballplayers marched off to serve their country, but also created severe restrictions on the game through gas rationing and electrical power, travel cutbacks and the elimination of night games in coastal areas on both sides of the country.

Despite the war threat, 41 NAPBL circuits operated in 1941, but many of them soon suspended operations. The number was down to 31 in 1942 and fall to just nine in 1943. But Bramham had one more major battle to fight during his term of office. Late in 1943, when he opted to run for reelection, there were rumors of a possible floor fight at the Winter Meetings. It would hinge on the issue of the existing NAPBL treasury upwards of $250,000. Some leagues, with operations suspended, wanted to divide up the money and liquidate the fund. The key issue was whether or not the suspended leagues or only those still active had the right to vote. Bramham prevailed, keeping the treasury intact for post-war operations, and was elected to a new five-year term as president. But time and responsibilities affected his health, and was forced to announce his retirement on the eve of the 1946 Winter Meetings. Bramham was retained as a consultant to the new president Trautman, but he died a few months later.

== Death ==
Judge Bramham died from uremia in Durham, North Carolina in 1947, just five days before his 73rd birthday. He was survived by his wife Ninnon Marie (née Umstead) Bramham (1878–1964) and his son Winfrey Peyton Bramham (1899–1966), who was a member of the Cincinnati Reds' front office from the 1940s into the early 1960s.
