= Freddy Parent =

American baseball player (1875–1972)

- Shortstop
- Born: November 25, 1875; Biddeford, Maine, U.S.
- Died: November 2, 1972 (aged 96); Sanford, Maine, U.S.
- Batted: Right Threw: Right

MLB debut
- July 14, 1899, for the St. Louis Perfectos

Last MLB appearance
- April 30, 1911, for the Chicago White Sox

MLB statistics
- Batting average: .262
- Home runs: 20
- Runs batted in: 471
- Stats at Baseball Reference

Teams
- St. Louis Perfectos (1899); Boston Americans (1901–1907); Chicago White Sox (1908–1911)

Career highlights and awards
- World Series champion (1903)

Alfred Joseph Parent (November 11, 1875 – November 2, 1972) was an American professional baseball player. He played all or part of eleven seasons in Major League Baseball (MLB), between 1899 and 1911, for the St. Louis Perfectos, Boston Americans and Chicago White Sox, primarily as a shortstop. Parent batted and threw right-handed. He was born in Biddeford, Maine.

Listed at 5 ft 7 in (1.70 m), 154 lb., Parent was known primarily for his fielding skills, but he also was a solid hitter and an intelligent baserunner. Twice he hit .300, including a career-high .306 in 1901, and led the American League in at bats in 1902. He broke up three no-hit bids, as he got his club's only hits in these games. At shortstop, defensive play saved Cy Young's perfect game. He also was a member of the Boston team who clinched in 1903 the first World Championship in major league history.

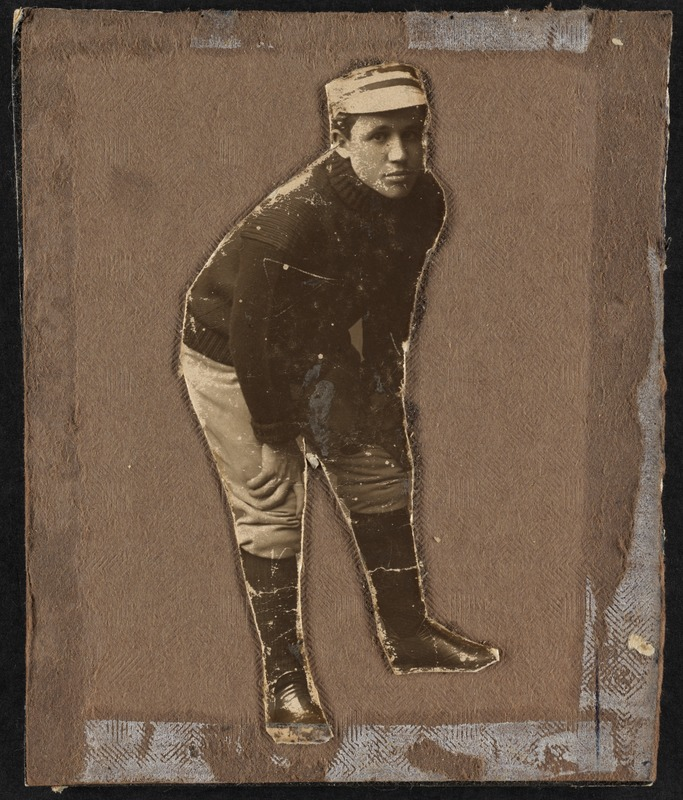
Boston Americans shortstop Fred Parent, 1901. Michael T. "Nuf Ced" McGreevy Collection, Boston Public Library

In a 12-season career, Parent was a .262 hitter (1306-for-4984) with 20 home runs and 471 RBI in 1327 games, including 180 doubles, 74 triples, 633 runs and 184 stolen bases. In the 1903 World Series, he hit .281 (9-32) with eight runs and four RBI.

Parent was traded to the Baltimore Orioles in 1911 after a pay dispute with Charles Comiskey. In 1914 Baltimore signed Babe Ruth. Parent coached Ruth more than anybody else at the time. Due to low attendance owner Dunn began to sell players. He visited the Red Sox and closed the sale of Ruth with help of Parent who was trusted by player-manager Bill Carrigan.

In the fall of 1960, Parent appeared on the television program I've Got A Secret alongside Pittsburgh Pirate Tommy Leach, as a commemoration of participating in the first World Series in 1903.

Parent died in Sanford, Maine, at the age of 96. At the time of his death, he was the last surviving participant of the inaugural 1903 World Series.

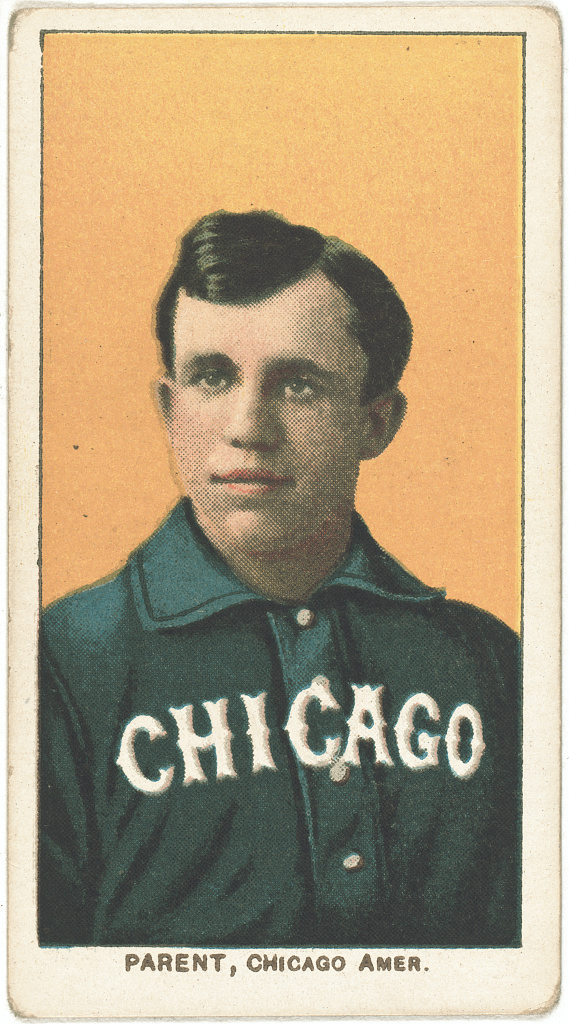
Freddy Parent

== See also ==
- List of Major League Baseball career stolen bases leaders
