= Rube Waddell =

American baseball player (1876–1914)

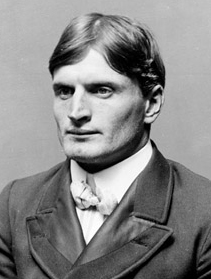
- Waddell in 1901
- Pitcher
- Born: October 13, 1876; Bradford, Pennsylvania, U.S.
- Died: April 1, 1914 (aged 37); San Antonio, Texas, U.S.
- Batted: Right Threw: Left

MLB debut
- September 8, 1897, for the Louisville Colonels

Last MLB appearance
- August 1, 1910, for the St. Louis Browns

MLB statistics
- Win–loss record: 193–143
- Earned run average: 2.16
- Strikeouts: 2,316
- Stats at Baseball Reference

Teams
- Louisville Colonels (1897, 1899); Pittsburgh Pirates (1900–1901); Chicago Orphans (1901); Philadelphia Athletics (1902–1907); St. Louis Browns (1908–1910)

Career highlights and awards
- Triple Crown (1905); AL wins leader (1905); 2× ERA leader (1900, 1905); 6× AL strikeout leader (1902–1907); Philadelphia Baseball Wall of Fame; Athletics Hall of Fame

Member of the National

Baseball Hall of Fame
- Induction: 1946
- Election method: Old-Timers Committee

George Edward "Rube" Waddell (October 13, 1876 – April 1, 1914) was an American pitcher in Major League Baseball (MLB). A left-hander, he played for 13 years, with the Louisville Colonels, Pittsburgh Pirates, and Chicago Orphans in the National League, as well as the Philadelphia Athletics and St. Louis Browns in the American League. Waddell was elected to the Baseball Hall of Fame in 1946.

Waddell is best remembered for his highly eccentric behavior, and for being a remarkably dominant strikeout pitcher in an era when batters were expert at making contact. He had an excellent fastball, a sharp-breaking curveball, a screwball, and superb control; his strikeout-to-walk ratio was almost 3-to-1, and he led the major leagues in strikeouts for six consecutive years.

== Early life ==
Waddell was born on October 13, 1876, just outside Bradford, Pennsylvania, and grew up in Prospect, Pennsylvania. Biographer Alan Levy wrote that Waddell was "a decidedly different sort of child". At the age of three, he wandered over to a local fire station and stayed there for several days. He did not attend school very often. He was left-handed and strengthened his arm as a child by throwing rocks at birds he encountered while working on his family's land. He also worked on mining and drilling sites as a youngster, which helped his conditioning.

The nickname "Rube" generally implies an uneducated country boy. In Waddell's case specifically, "His odd, lank figure and queer remarks when in or out of the [pitcher's] box have earned for him the name of 'Rube'."

== Professional career ==
=== Early baseball career ===
Waddell's career wound through a number of teams. He was notably unpredictable; early in his career, he once left in the middle of a game to go fishing. He also had a longstanding fascination with fire trucks and ran off the field to chase after them during games on multiple occasions. He would disappear for months at a time during the offseason, and it was not known where he went until it was discovered that he was wrestling alligators in a circus. He was easily distracted by opposing fans who held up puppies, which caused him to run over to play with them, and shiny objects, which seemed to put him in a trance. An alcoholic for much of his short life, he reportedly spent his entire first signing bonus on a drinking binge; as a pun of the baseball term "southpaw" denoting a left-handed pitcher, the Sporting News dubbed him a "sousepaw". His eccentric behavior led to constant battles with his managers and scuffles with bad-tempered teammates.

Waddell's first professional contract was for $500 with Louisville, where he pitched two league games and a couple of exhibitions with the team at the end of the 1897 season. When the season ended, he was loaned to the Detroit Tigers of the Western League to gain professional experience. After defaulting on rent and being fined by owner George Vanderbeck, he left Detroit in late May to pitch in Canada before eventually returning to Homestead, Pennsylvania, to pitch semi-pro baseball there. However, Louisville retained his rights and he was lent to Columbus of the Western League in 1899, continued with them when the franchise moved to Grand Rapids mid-season, and finished with a record of 26–8. He rejoined Louisville in the final month of the 1899 season and won seven of nine decisions. When the National League (NL) contracted to eight teams for the 1900 season, Louisville ownership bought the Pittsburgh franchise and the Louisville franchise was terminated. Louisville's top players, including Waddell, Honus Wagner, and Fred Clarke, were transferred to Pittsburgh.

Waddell debuted with the Pittsburgh Pirates in 1900, leading the National League in earned run average. However, his erratic behavior led manager Fred Clarke to suspend him. After he pitched in semi-pro ball in small towns such as Punxsutawney, Milwaukee Brewers manager Connie Mack learned of his availability. With Pittsburgh's approval, Mack convinced Waddell to pitch for Milwaukee for several weeks in the summer of 1900. Milwaukee was in the newly named American League (AL), formerly known as the Western League, which was not yet directly competing with the NL. On August 19, Waddell pitched the first game of a doubleheader for Milwaukee, winning in the 17th inning on his own triple. Mack offered Waddell a three-day fishing vacation if he agreed to pitch the second game. After Waddell threw a complete-game shutout for the victory, he headed to Pewaukee Lake to go fishing. Pittsburgh's management quickly recognized Waddell's talent and asked for his return.

=== Dominant seasons ===
Waddell had worn out his welcome in Pittsburgh by 1901, and his contract was sold to the Chicago Cubs, then managed by Tom Loftus. Despite his previous successes managing Waddell in Columbus/Grand Rapids, Loftus was not given the latitude to cope with Waddell's problems as the Cubs manager. When problems led to his suspension, Waddell left the Cubs to pitch for semi-pro teams in northern Illinois, as well as Racine and Kenosha, Wisconsin. Frank Chance and Joe Cantillon then invited Waddell to join a barnstorming team that traveled to California, where he was persuaded to stay and joined the Los Angeles Loo Loos in a league that a year later would become the Pacific Coast League.

Connie Mack, then in Philadelphia, was desperate for pitching; when he learned that Waddell was pitching in California, he dispatched two Pinkerton agents to sneak Waddell back to Philadelphia, where he led the Philadelphia Athletics to the 1902 American League crown. Much later, Mack described Waddell as "the atom bomb of baseball long before the atom bomb was discovered". On July 1, 1902, Waddell became the second major-league pitcher to throw an immaculate inning, striking out all three batters on nine total pitches in the third inning of a 2–0 win over the Baltimore Orioles .

Shortly after the 1902 baseball season, reports indicated Waddell would play for Connie Mack's Athletics football team. However, he never played for the football Athletics. Mack later said, "There was a little fellow from Wanamaker's who asked for the job of quarterback. I don't think he weighed more than 140 [lbs]. Well, the first practice Waddell tackled him and broke his leg. It was the first inkling John [Shibe] and I had that players could be badly hurt in football. We got Rube out of there without delay. He was supposed to be pretty good, but we never found out." Waddell had requested to play as a halfback, but even before he was pulled from play, Mack told Waddell that he would not be allowed to play any position other than guard. Waddell returned to his family's home in Pennsylvania and played with local football clubs there. He played with various football teams in his later years and had a brief stint as a goalkeeper in the St. Louis Soccer League.

In his prime, Waddell was the game's premier power pitcher, with 302 strikeouts in 1903, 115 more than runner-up Bill Donovan. According to baseball historian Lee Allen in The American League Story, Waddell began the 1903 season "sleeping in a firehouse at Camden, New Jersey, and ended it tending bar in a saloon in Wheeling, West Virginia. In between those events, he won 22 games for the Philadelphia Athletics; [...] toured the nation in a melodrama called The Stain of Guilt; courted, married, and became separated from May Wynne Skinner of Lynn, Massachusetts; saved a woman from drowning; accidentally shot a friend through the hand; and was bitten by a lion." His performance in The Stain of Guilt was notable in that his co-stars, who had realized that he was incapable of memorizing his lines, allowed him to improvise his lines for every show; the play was critically acclaimed and was much discussed for a scene in which Waddell lifted the actor playing the villain and threw him across the stage with ease. Waddell used his newfound stardom as an actor to negotiate a higher wage for his baseball career.

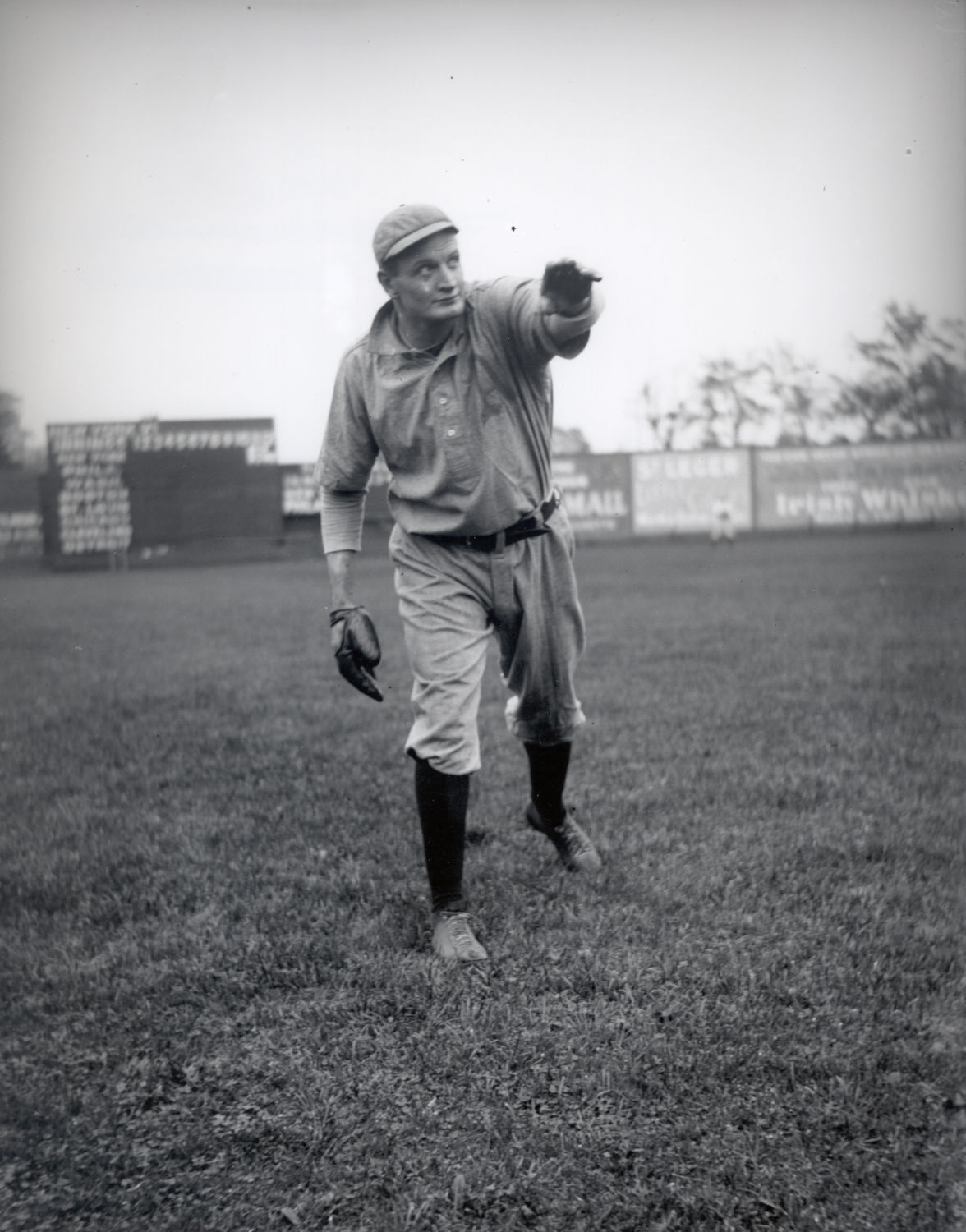
Waddell with the Philadelphia A's in 1905, taken at Hilltop Park in New York City

Waddell followed that season with 349 strikeouts in 1904, 110 more than runner-up Jack Chesbro. No other pitcher compiled consecutive 300-strikeout seasons until Sandy Koufax in 1965 and 1966. Waddell was the opposing pitcher for Cy Young's perfect game on May 5, 1904, and hit a flyball for the final out. Waddell's 349 strikeouts represented the modern-era season record for more than 60 years, and remains sixth on the modern list. In 1946, it was initially believed that Bob Feller's 348 strikeouts had broken Waddell's single-season mark, but research into his 1904 season box scores revealed uncounted strikeouts that lifted him back above Feller. Waddell still holds the AL single-season strikeout record by a left-handed pitcher.

In 1905, Waddell won a Triple Crown for pitching. He finished with a 27–10 win–loss record, 287 strikeouts, and a 1.48 earned run average. It was also his fourth consecutive season with 20 or more wins. Around this time, he was sharing a room with teammate Ossee Schreckengost, as was customary during the era; Schreckengost later refused to share the room until a contract clause was created which would bar Waddell from eating crackers in bed. Waddell also gained more fame for saving the lives of people inside a department store when he picked up a burning oil stove that had overturned and carried it out of the building before it could start a fire. In Eliot Asinof's 1963 account of the 1919 World Series fix Eight Men Out (later made into a film of the same name), mention is made of Waddell being bribed not to pitch in the 1905 World Series against the New York Giants. Further discussion of the 1905 World Series has taken place at SABR.

=== Later career ===
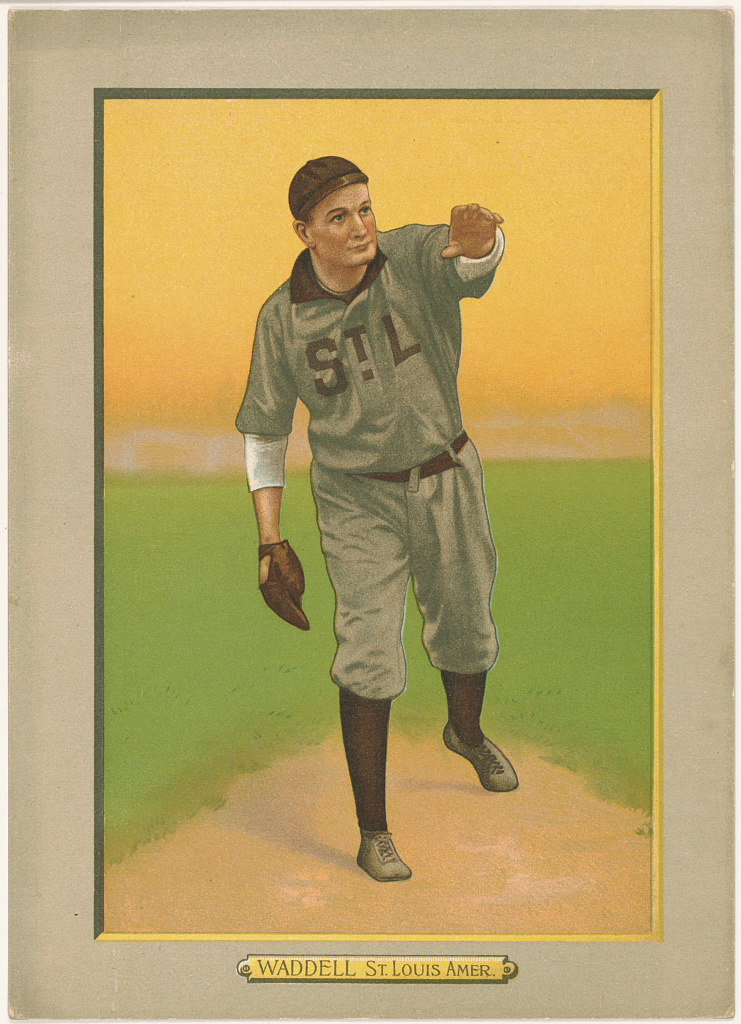
Baseball card of Waddell derived from the 1905 photo

Waddell's drinking problem was exacerbated by a tumultuous marriage to May Wynne Skinner, his second of three wives, and a series of injuries in 1905 and 1906. Skinner threatened to prosecute Rube for bigamy because she did not recognize the divorce granted Rube in St. Louis. But the divorce, granted by the circuit court on February 9, 1910, was legal, so the former Mrs. Waddell had no case.

On April 8, 1908, The Scranton Republican Newspaper published an interview with Waddell entitled "Unkissed Girl Sought by Rube Waddell". This article provided yet another example of Waddell's progressing instability. Waddell's intent was to use the article as an advertisement for his desire to find himself another wife.

Ken Burns' 1994 documentary, Baseball, claimed Waddell had even lost track of how many women he had married. In time, his alcohol use began to erode his relationships with his Athletics teammates. Schreckengost, a one-time friend who regularly fetched alcohol and fishing poles for Waddell, squabbled with both Waddell and Mack for being treated differently for the same offenses.

Waddell's increasingly erratic behavior included an incident in which he got into a fistfight on a cross-country train after making fun of a teammate's straw hat. Complaints from teammates forced Mack to send Waddell to the St. Louis Browns for $5,000 in early 1908 despite his continued success. Recent commentators such as Bill James have suggested that Waddell suffered from a developmental disability, mental retardation, autism, or attention deficit disorder (ADD). Not much was known about these mental conditions, or their diagnoses, at the time. Though eccentric and childlike, Waddell was not illiterate as some sources have claimed.

To make sure he stayed out of trouble during the off-season, Browns owner Robert Hedges hired him as a hunter over the winters of 1908 and 1909. He set the league record for strikeouts in a game with 16 in 1908. Further drinking and marital problems with his third wife, Madge Maguire, plagued Waddell; he passed out in the middle of a game against New York in 1909. These incidents led to his release in 1910. He finished the season pitching with Joe McGinnity for Newark in the Eastern League and never played another major league game. His career stats were 193–143, 2,316 strikeouts, and a 2.16 earned run average, with 50 shutouts and 261 complete games in 2961 1/3 innings pitched.

== Pitching style ==
Waddell's pitching repertoire usually consisted of only two pitches: one of the fastest fastballs in the league and a hard curve. However, he had command of many more pitches, including slow curves, screwballs, "fadeaways" and even a "flutterball". Mack once said that Waddell's curve was "even better than his speed... [He] had the fastest and deepest curve I've ever seen".

Waddell enjoyed waving his teammates off the field and then striking out the side. He actually did so only in exhibition games, since official baseball rules prohibit playing with fewer than nine men on the field in regulation play. But in a league game in Detroit, Waddell actually had his outfielders come in close and sit down on the grass to watch him strike out the side. Once the stunt almost backfired. Pitching an exhibition game in Memphis, he took the field alone with his catcher, Doc Powers, for the last three innings. With two out in the ninth, Powers dropped the third strike, allowing the batter to reach first. The next two hitters blooped pop flies that fell just behind the mound. Despite running himself ragged, Waddell subsequently struck out the last man.

== Final years ==
After his major league career was over, Waddell pitched for parts of three more years in the minor leagues, including a 20-win season for the Minneapolis Millers in 1911. In addition to pitching for the Millers, he pitched for the Minneapolis Rough Riders and with the Virginia Ore Diggers of the Northern League in 1913. By that season, however, his health had declined to such an extent that he no longer resembled the muscular, long-limbed hero of the prior decade.

Following the 1911 season, Waddell spent the winter with Millers manager Joe Cantillon at his farm in Hickman, Kentucky. When the Mississippi River rose and threatened the town with flooding in the spring of 1912, Waddell spent hours standing in icy water up to his armpits, stacking sandbags to reinforce the levees. Catching pneumonia, he lost much of the vitality that had sustained him, and a second flood in Hickman and another ensuing case of pneumonia in 1913 took the rest. That same year, while in Minneapolis, he was diagnosed with tuberculosis and moved to live with his sister in San Antonio, Texas. That winter, Waddell recovered enough to spend time with his parents, who were living in Boerne. As the spring of 1914 approached, however, his condition worsened, and his family placed him in the Lutheran Sanitarium in San Antonio, where he died on April 1, 1914, at the age of 37.

== Honors ==
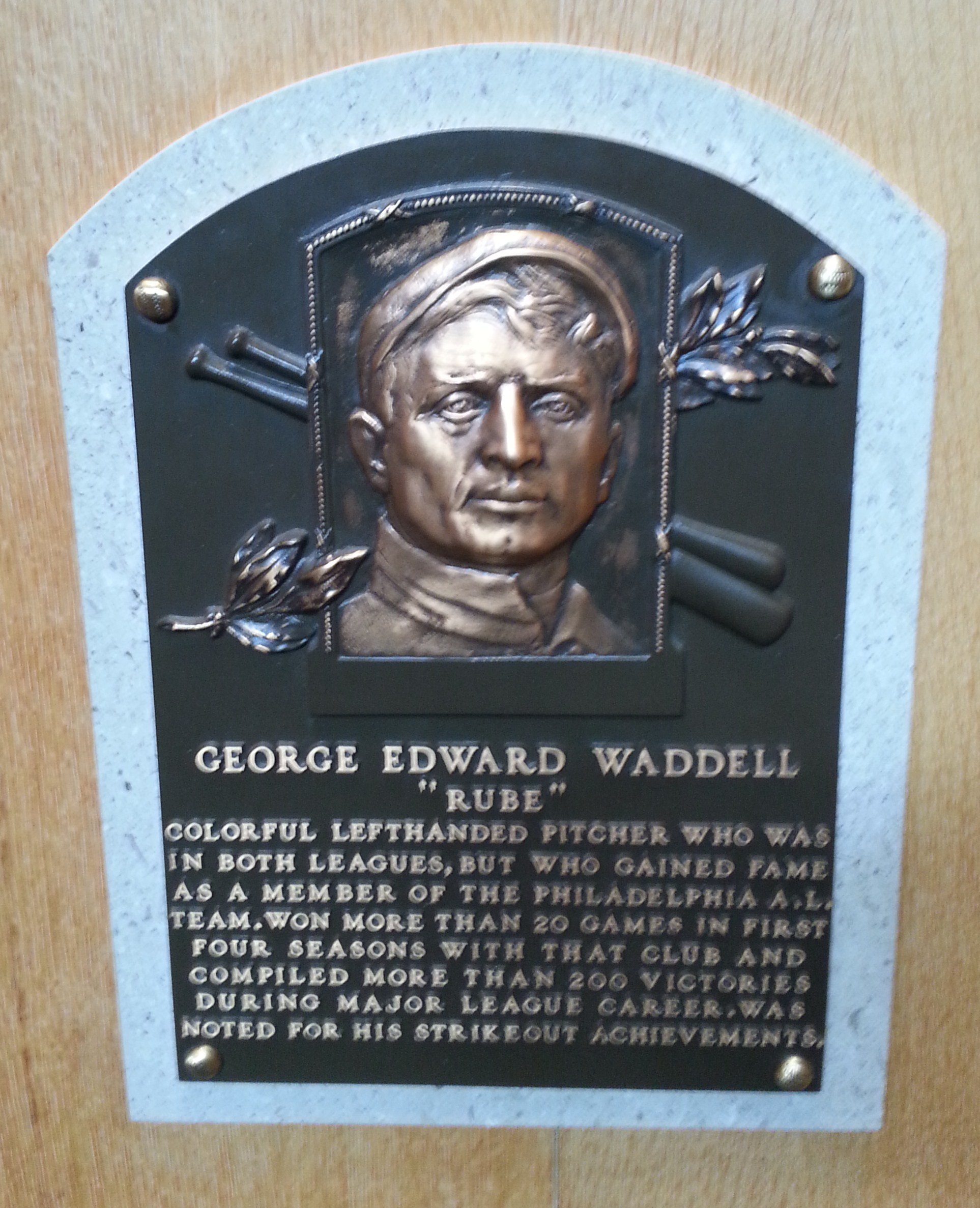
Waddell's plaque at the National Baseball Hall of Fame and Museum

Waddell was elected to the Baseball Hall of Fame in 1946 by the Veterans Committee that looked to enshrine a number of players from his era and the previous century who had contributed to the growth of the game. One of Waddell's contributions was that he was perhaps the greatest drawing card in the first decade of the century, a man whose unique talents and personality drew baseball fans around the country to ballparks.

In 1981, Lawrence Ritter and Donald Honig included him in their book The 100 Greatest Baseball Players of All Time. Under what they called "the Smoky Joe Wood Syndrome", they argued in favor of including players of truly exceptional talent whose career was curtailed by injury (or, in Waddell's case, substance abuse), despite not having had career statistics that would quantitatively rank them with the all-time greats. In this case, fans and peers recognized Waddell as a baseball great long before Ritter and Honig did.

== See also ==
- Major League Baseball titles leaders
- Major League Baseball Triple Crown
- List of Major League Baseball annual ERA leaders
- List of Major League Baseball annual strikeout leaders
- List of Major League Baseball annual wins leaders
- List of Major League Baseball career hit batsmen leaders
- List of Major League Baseball career strikeout leaders

== Notes ==
Awards and achievements
Preceded by Cy Young	American League Pitching Triple Crown; 1905	Succeeded by Walter Johnson
