= Stuffy McInnis =

American baseball player and manager (1890–1960)

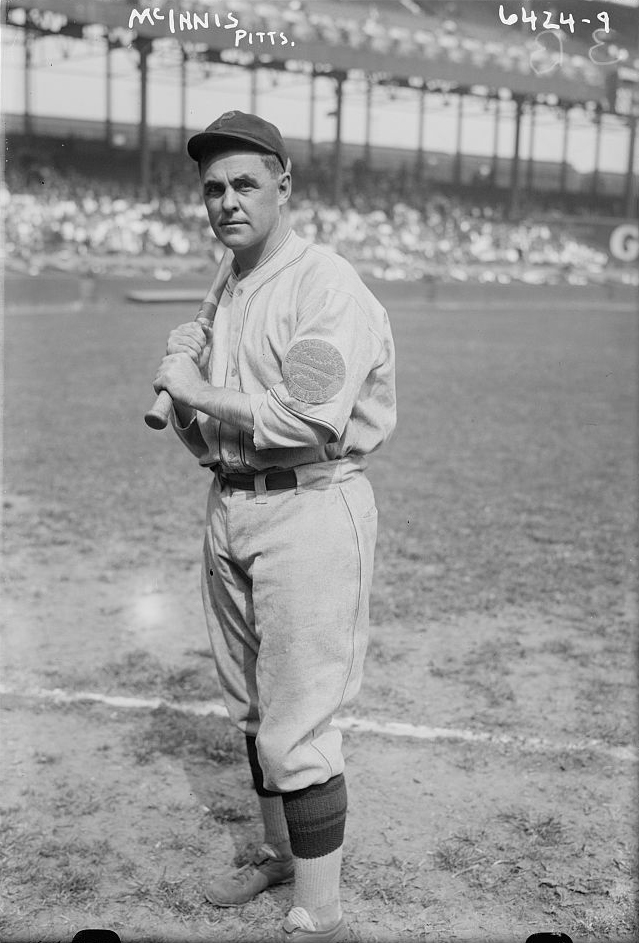
- McInnis with the Pittsburgh Pirates in 1925
- First baseman / Manager
- Born: September 19, 1890; Gloucester, Massachusetts, U.S.
- Died: February 16, 1960 (aged 69); Ipswich, Massachusetts, U.S.
- Batted: Right Threw: Right

MLB debut
- April 12, 1909, for the Philadelphia Athletics

Last MLB appearance
- August 1, 1927, for the Philadelphia Phillies

MLB statistics
- Batting average: .307
- Hits: 2,405
- Home runs: 20
- Runs batted in: 1,063
- Managerial record: 51–103
- Winning %: .331
- Stats at Baseball Reference
- Managerial record at Baseball Reference

Teams
- As player: Philadelphia Athletics (1909–1917); Boston Red Sox (1918–1921); Cleveland Indians (1922); Boston Braves (1923–1924); Pittsburgh Pirates (1925–1926); Philadelphia Phillies (1927); As manager: Philadelphia Phillies (1927)

Career highlights and awards
- 4× World Series champion (1911, 1913, 1918, 1925)

John Phalen "Stuffy" McInnis (September 19, 1890 – February 16, 1960) was an American first baseman and manager in Major League Baseball. McInnis gained his nickname as a youngster in the Boston suburban leagues, where his spectacular playing brought shouts of "that's the stuff, kid".

From 1909 to 1927, McInnis played for the Philadelphia Athletics (1909–1917), Boston Red Sox (1918–1921), Cleveland Indians (1922), Boston Braves (1923–1924), Pittsburgh Pirates (1925–1926) and Philadelphia Phillies (1927). He batted and threw right-handed. He won the World Series four times as a player, doing so with three different teams.

== Career ==
In a 19-season career, McInnis posted a .307 batting average with 20 home runs and 1,063 RBI in 2,128 games.

A native of Gloucester, Massachusetts, McInnis broke into baseball with the Philadelphia Athletics as a shortstop in 1909. Two seasons later, he replaced Harry Davis at first base as a member of the famous $100,000 infield, teaming up with second baseman Eddie Collins, third baseman Frank Baker and shortstop Jack Barry. As prices and costs rose in later years the tag seemed low, but at this time the group was higher-price than any.

The Athletics were in their prime, winning the American League pennant in 1910, 1911, 1913 and 1914, and back-to-back World Championships in 1910 and 1911. But after they were swept by the Boston Braves in the 1914 World Series, owner Connie Mack asked waivers on three starting pitchers and began to dismantle his team in light of the attempted raids on his stars by the new Federal League. The $100,000 infield broke up after Collins was sold to the White Sox, Baker went to the Yankees, and Barry was sent to the Red Sox. Only McInnis stayed, and he was traded to the Red Sox at the end of the 1917 season.

McInnis was part of the Red Sox in the 1918 World Series. He drove in the only run of Babe Ruth's 1-0 pitching victory over the Chicago Cubs in Game 1 of the Series.

He joined Cleveland for one season in 1922 before going to the National League in 1923. He played with the Braves and Pirates, and also managed the Phillies in 1927, his last year in the majors.

A good contact line drive hitter, McInnis batted over .300 during 12 of his 19 seasons, and in each year from 1910 to 1915. His most productive season came in 1912, when he hit .327, though he batted .368 in 59 games for the Pirates champion team in 1925. Extremely hard to strike out, he fanned only 189 times in 7,822 at-bats and amassed 2,405 hits. In 1921, he struck out only 9 times in 584 at bats.

McInnis also excelled in moving runners ahead with sacrifice hits. His career total of 384 sacrifice hits is third best in MLB history. For hitters in the career span he played in, he was 7th in hits and he ranked 23rd all-time for hits when he retired.

McInnis also was an especially solid defensive player. He for decades held major league fielding records for first basemen over one season. In 1921, he played in 152 games with the Red Sox and committed only one error in 1,651 chances for a .9993 mark, and his 1,300 errorless chances, also represented a season mark. Between May 31, 1921, and June 2, 1922, McInnis set a third record with 1,700 chances without an error over the course of 163 games. He finished with an overall .991 fielding percentage in the majors.

On June 25, 2007, Kevin Youkilis played in his 120th consecutive game at first base without an error, breaking the prior Red Sox record set in 1921 by McInnis. In his 205th game without an error on April 27, 2008, Youkilis also established a new major league record for first basemen when he fielded his 1,701st consecutive chance without an error, passing the old mark of 1,700 set by McInnis. His streak was snapped at 238 games (2,002 fielding attempts) on June 7, 2008.

Following his retirement as a player, McInnis managed the Salem Witches of the minor leagues in 1928, coached the Norwich University baseball team from 1931–1944 and the Harvard baseball team from 1949–1954. In failing health for several years prior, McInnis died at the Benjamin Stickney Cable Memorial Hospital in Ipswich, Massachusetts on February 16, 1960 at age 69. His wife, Elise, died 2 years earlier.

== See also ==
- List of Major League Baseball individual streaks
- List of Major League Baseball career hits leaders
- List of Major League Baseball career triples leaders
- List of Major League Baseball career runs batted in leaders
- List of Major League Baseball career stolen bases leaders
- List of Major League Baseball player-managers
