= 100000 (disambiguation) =

100,000, 100000, 10,0000, 1,00000, 1E5, 10^{5}, hundred thousand, ten myriad may refer to:

- 100000 (number), the decimal number "100,000" and values associated with that range and magnitude
- $100,000, a denomination of money circulated by the US
- Project 100,000, a Vietnam-era US Army recruiting program
- 100,000 AD

== See also ==
- 100.000 (disambiguation)
- $100,000 infield, a period of the Philadelphia Athletics baseball club
- 100,000 B.C., a television serial of Doctor Who
- "100,000 Years", a song on Kiss (Kiss album)
- The £100K Drop, a British game show formerly called The Million Pound Drop
