= Scoreboard =

Display device used in sports

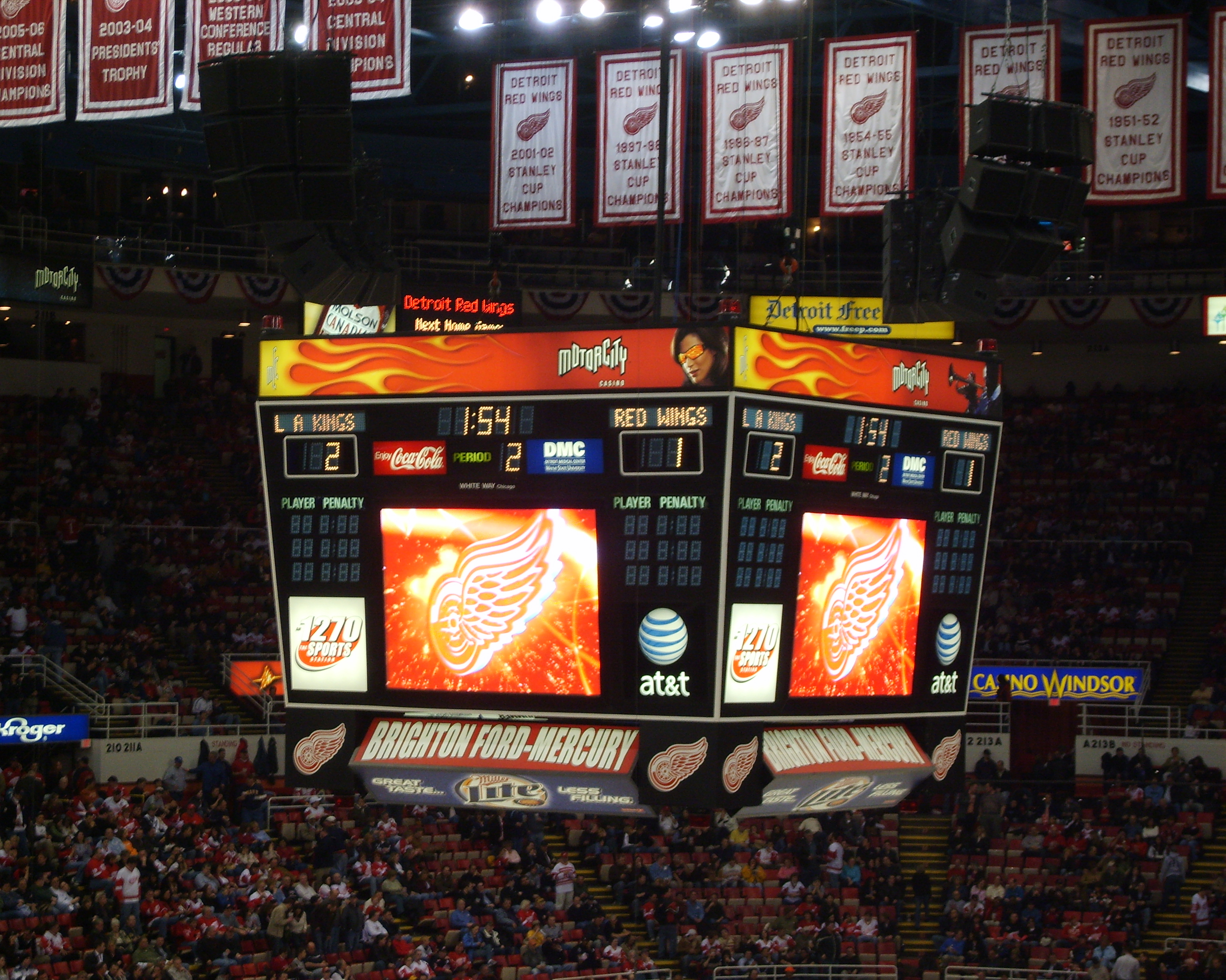
A scoreboard at Joe Louis Arena during an NHL game in 2007

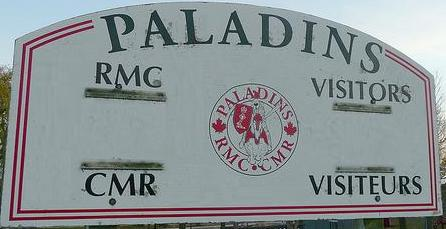
Royal Military College Paladins bilingual scoreboard, inner field, Royal Military College of Canada

A scoreboard is a large board for publicly displaying the score in a game. Most levels of sport from high school and above use at least one scoreboard for keeping score, measuring time, and displaying statistics. Scoreboards in the past used a mechanical clock and numeral cards to display the score. When a point was made, a person would put the appropriate digits on a hook. Most modern scoreboards use electromechanical or electronic means of displaying the score. In these, digits are often composed of large dot-matrix or seven-segment displays made of incandescent bulbs, light-emitting diodes, or electromechanical flip segments. An official or neutral person will operate the scoreboard, using a control panel.

== Scoreboards in various sports ==
=== North American football ===
A scoreboard for American high school football, which also features tenths timing for track and field events

In both the United States and Canadian football codes, the minimum details displayed are the time and score of both teams. A typical high school scoreboard will additionally display the down, the yardage of the line of scrimmage, the yards to go until a first down, the team with the possession (usually signified with the outline of a football in lights next to the possessing team's score) and the quarter. Higher levels will also include play clocks and the number of time outs left for each team. American football scoreboards may include a horn to signal the end of a quarter, but they are not used in larger venues. (Tenths of a second timing and the horn signal are not used in American Football, the horn because a play may be in progress [or an untimed down] when the time runs out, then the period ends at the conclusion of the play in progress, barring a penalty.) In those cases, the referee or public address announcer denotes the termination of a quarter vocally via the PA system; formerly quarter ends were denoted with the firing of a starting pistol (last used in the NFL in the 1993 season) in the era before digital timing.

=== Basketball ===
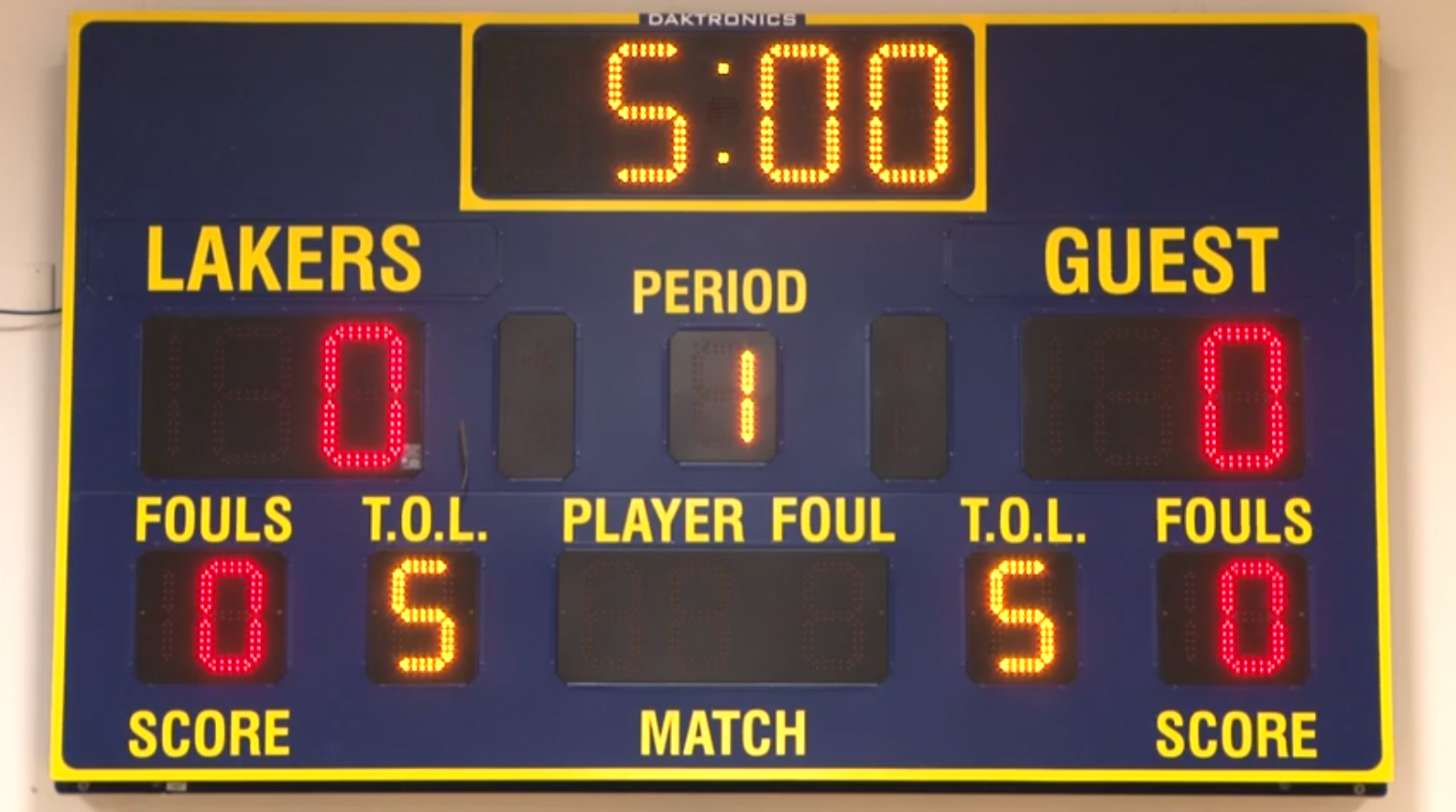
A basketball/volleyball scoreboard

A basketball scoreboard will at the minimum display the time left in the period and both teams' scores. The last minute of each quarter is usually displayed with tenths of a second, which is required in FIBA, NBA (since 1989), and NCAA (since 2001). Most high school scoreboards also include a display of the number of team fouls, the number of the last player to commit a personal foul (with the total number of personal fouls for that player), the period, and indicators of which team is in the team foul penalty situation, and possession (with a separate possession arrow display at half-court; not used in the NBA). College basketball scoreboards include shot clocks and the number of time-outs left for each team, with some high school state athletics bodies also beginning to adopt shot clocks to remove end of game stalling. Larger scoreboards include statistics on the players in the game. Basketball scoreboards must include a horn or buzzer to signal the end of a period, fouls, and substitutions; the shot clocks have their own buzzer system sounding a different octave to avert any confusion with the game clock system.

In some multipurpose venues where ice hockey and basketball are played, the scoreboard unit which shows penalties will be used to display the player on the court, number of fouls, and points scored in the game. The team fouls are usually placed in the same position as shots on goal in hockey games. In some university arenas, the scorer's table, which has traditionally been used for displaying physically scrolling advertising boards along its face, may also feature either a traditional mechanical scoreboard, or a scoreboard display within a LED display on the front of the table which also functions with virtual scrolling advertisements.

Since 1991, the NBA has mandated that each shot clock carry a duplicate readout of the time left in the period in addition to the shot time. Since 2011, the shot clock also shows tenths of a second past five seconds left on the shot clock. Many college and even some high-school shot clocks (in states where a shot-clock rule is in effect for high-school basketball) now also include a game timer.

Three-sided game shot clocks became a trend in the 1990s, and after a controversial series of calls during the 2002 NBA Playoffs, the NBA instituted a new game shot clock rule in 2002, requiring specific visibility of the game- and shot-clock time for instant-replay purposes. FIBA installed a similar three-sided rule in 2004. The rule was further changed in 2005 by permitting a new Daktronics see-through model (one on top of the basket, one on the end of the basket unit) that has gained popularity as many OES and Daktronics venues have adopted the system. Since 2016, see-through clocks made by Tissot are what the NBA use for all venues.

Daktronics has introduced a technology called ColorSmart, which denotes the trailing team's score numbers with red lighting, while the leading team is in green. However this technology has yet to be utilized in a game settings as the bylaws of the major basketball sanctioning bodies and many of the high school athletic bodies decree that both scores must display in the same color; the rule came into effect in 1994 after Spectrum Scoreboards introduced an earlier version of the concept. This is used almost exclusively in recreation leagues.

=== Baseball ===
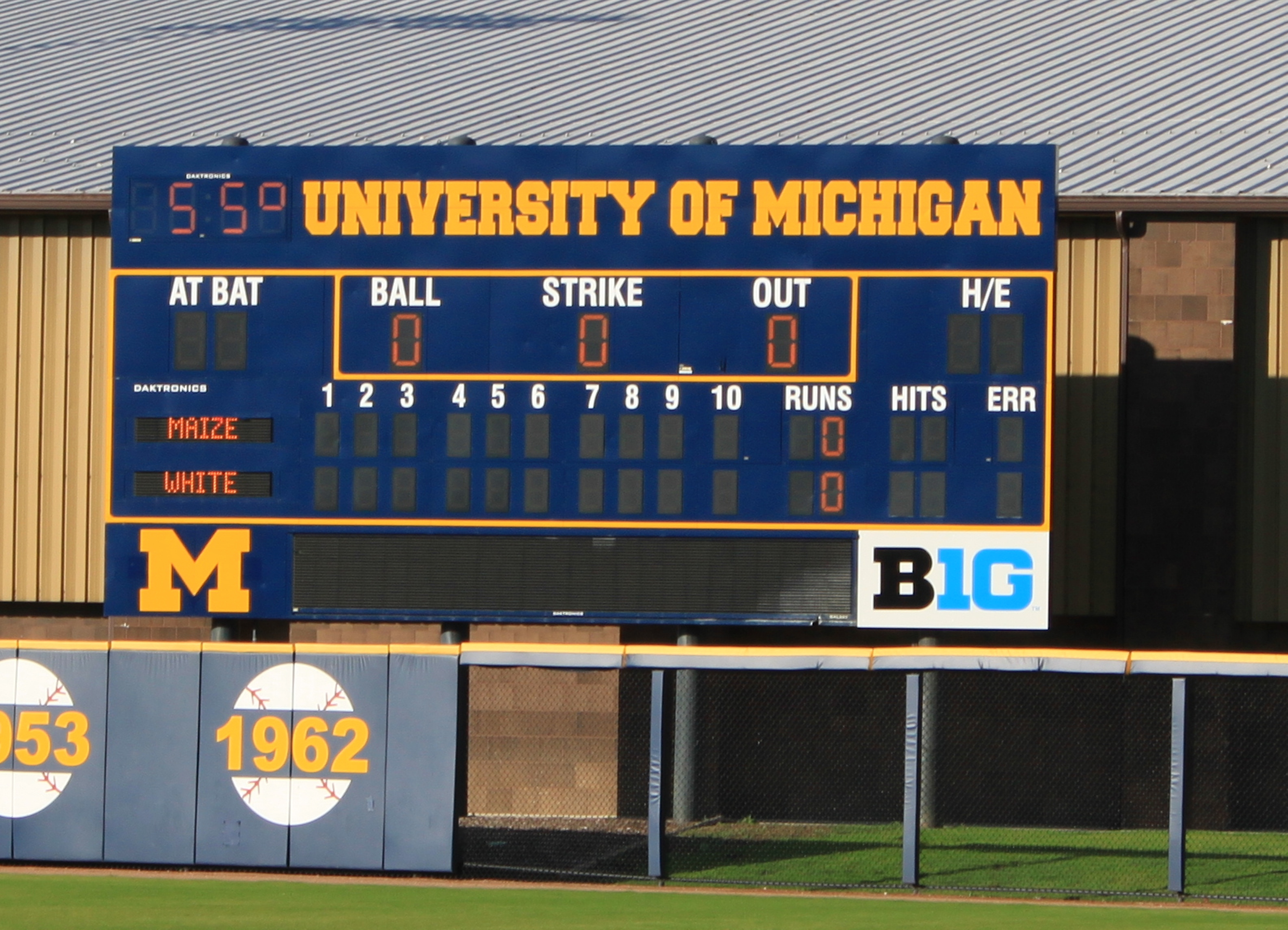
Ray Fisher Stadium baseball scoreboard with line score, University of Michigan

For baseball the scoreboard will at the minimum show both team scores, as well as the current inning. In addition the number of balls, strikes and outs is represented by digits or individual lights. Larger scoreboards offer an inning-by-inning breakdown of the scores, hits, errors, pitch count and the time of day, along with pitch clocks for leagues which mandate that rule. There may also be another display either separate or combined with the scoreboard listing the radar gun reading of the last pitch thrown in miles per hour. Almost all Major League facilities have a video board as a scoreboard or a matrix display. Usually these scoreboards are controlled via programs that keep statistics and not just the score. Usually the official scorer will operate this program. Then all the information the official scorer will enter, will automatically be made output to the scoreboard. Currently, the largest scoreboards are located at Progressive Field in Cleveland, Ohio, and Kansas City, Missouri's Kauffman Stadium. There is also a very large scoreboard at Citizens Bank Park, in Philadelphia, Pennsylvania.

Manually operated scoreboards are still found frequently in baseball, particularly at older venues. Well-known examples of manual scoreboards, using numbers painted on metal sheets hung by people working inside the scoreboard, include Fenway Park in Boston and Wrigley Field in Chicago, with Boston's scoreboard inspiring an alternate uniform for the Red Sox in the 2025 season as part of the City Connect program.

In some stadiums since 2005, LED boards which are the full height of the outfield wall have been installed to either replace a manual scoreboard or enhance an existing wall, are considered in play, and are durably constructed to withstand the impacts of fielders colliding with the wall, along with the impact of a baseball against the panel. Examples of this type of scoreboard display are seen in Milwaukee's Miller Park, Rogers Centre in Toronto, New Yankee Stadium in The Bronx, and Kauffman Stadium in Kansas City. In all three cases, the walls display the current game state of out-of-town games (often down to pitch count for the current at-bat and runners on base), statistics for the current batter or pitcher, and promotional messages.

Another display has been added to college, minor league and major league stadiums through the mid-2010s to the current day, the pitch clock, which became compulsory in Major League Baseball with the 2023 season. This is a separate display, analogous to the play clock in football, and has multiple iterations throughout the stadium for maximum player, coach, and umpire visibility, along with spectators. Outside of timing pitch releases, the pitch clock also displays time remaining before play resumes during a media timeout between innings, and to time warmup periods for relief pitchers coming out of the bullpen.

Many 21st century scoreboards also integrate a total pitch counter. Since 2017, National Federation of State High School Association rules have required each state's governing body to adopt a daily pitch limit.

=== Cricket ===
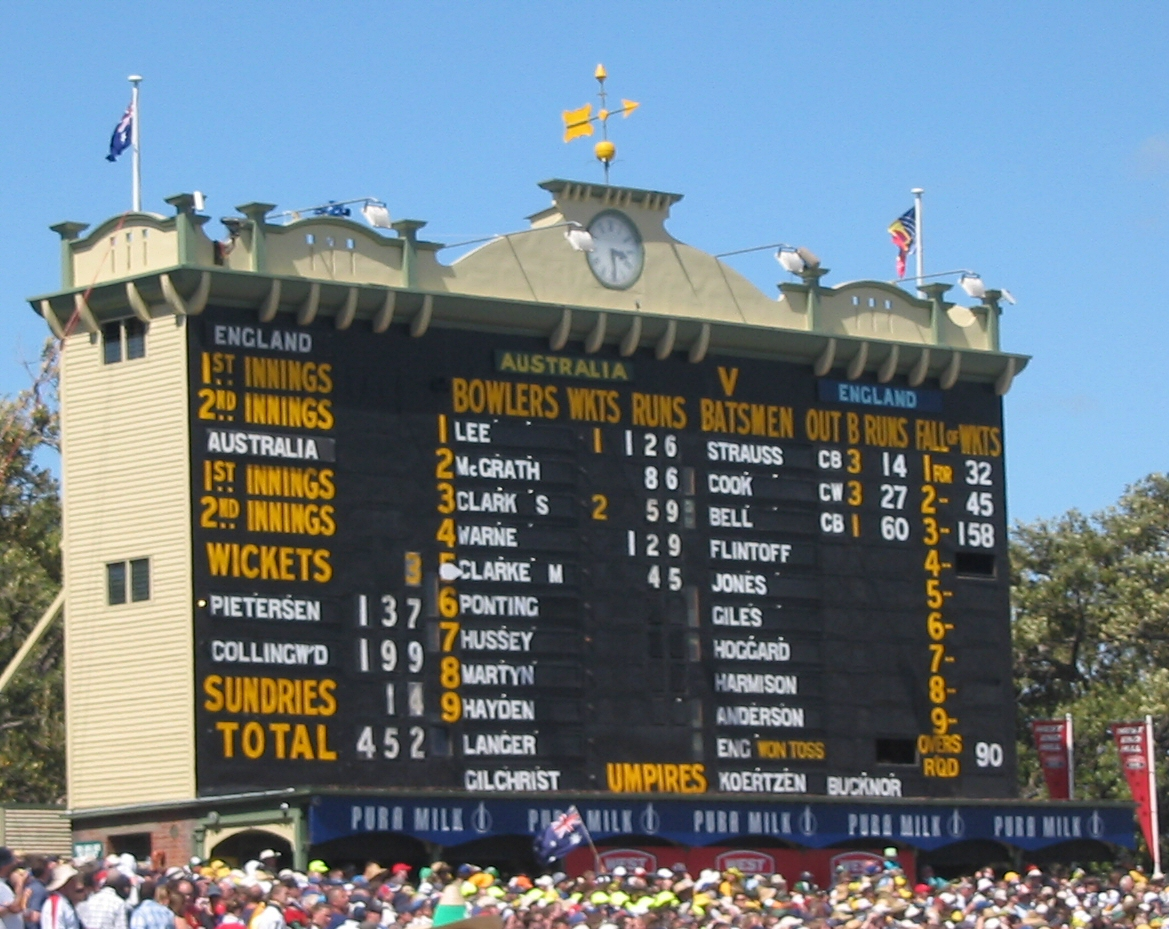
The scoreboard at the Adelaide Oval in Australia

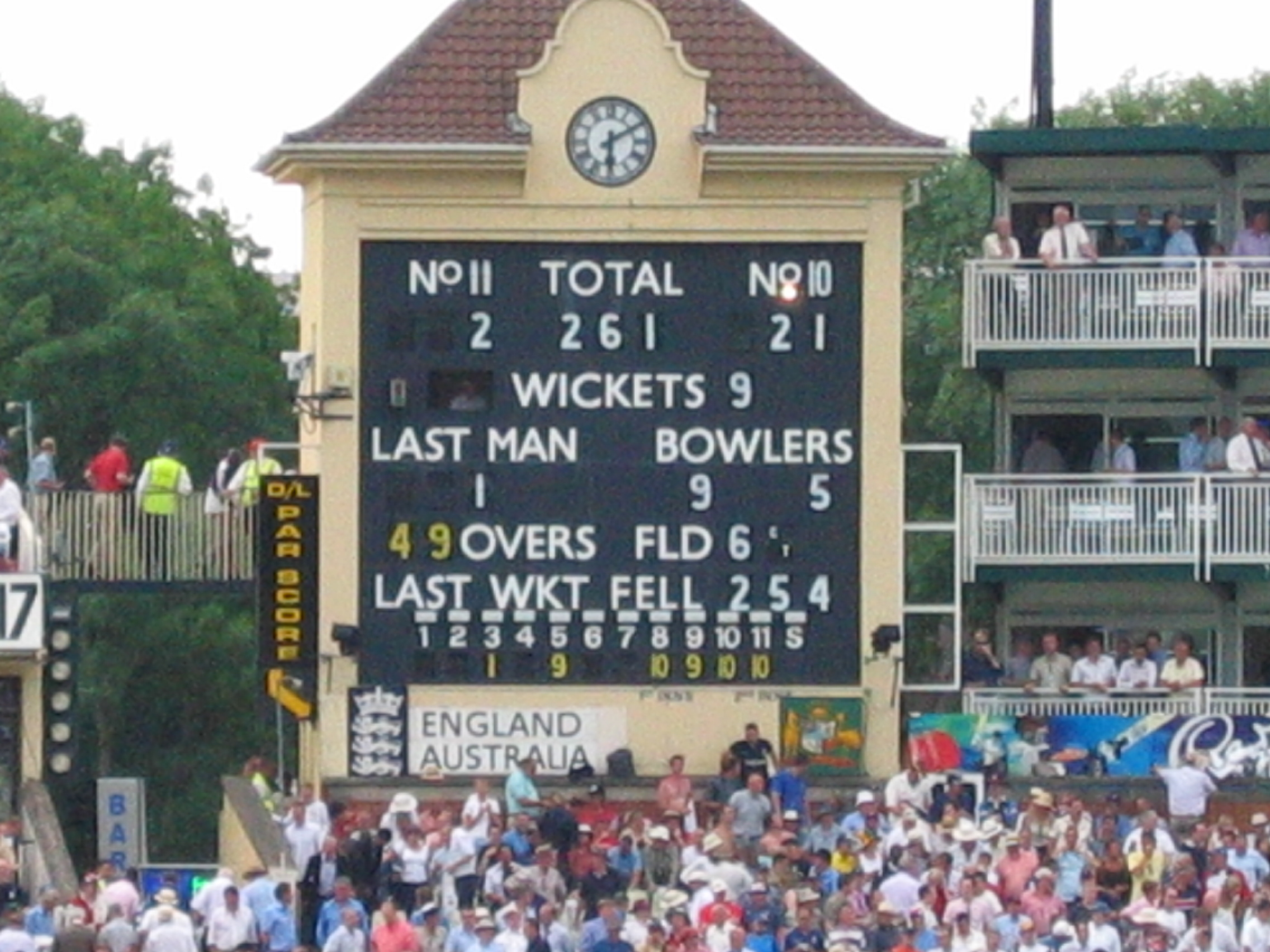
The Thwaites Scoreboard at Edgbaston, Birmingham

For cricket a scoreboard will as a minimum display the batting team's score, wickets fallen, the opposition's totals. Most county-standard scoreboards will also display each batsman's score, overs remaining, extras, the bowlers currently on and details of the last wicket to fall. Australian state scoreboards will usually contain more detailed information.

=== Ice hockey ===
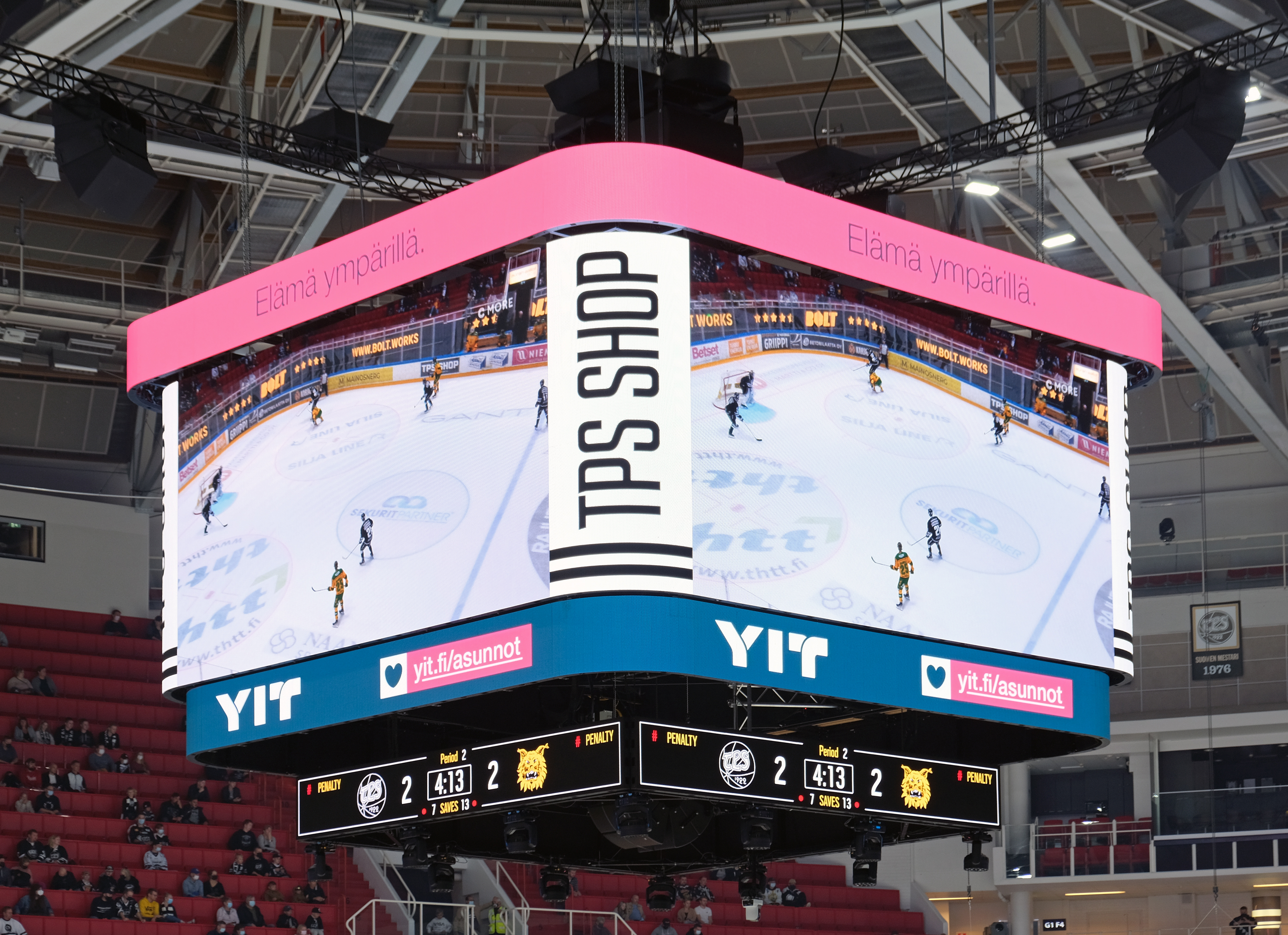
Modern ice hockey scoreboard in Gatorade Center, Turku.

An ice hockey scoreboard will at the minimum display the time left (in North America) or played (in Europe), the number of goals scored by each team as well as any penalties currently being served. Additional information such as shots on goal may be shown on smaller scoreboards located in the arena. Tenths of a second are usually displayed within the last minute of each period.

In multipurpose arenas, the penalties being served will appear in the multi-purpose panels, used for player statistics in basketball, with shots on goal in the same position as team fouls for basketball. In some arenas the sideboards of the hockey rink feature three or four LED displays the size of one advertising hoarding which will show scoring information and promotional messages, though their limited visibility makes them rarely used.

A horn or buzzer must be used to signal end of timeouts or period. In most games, the home team will either play a recording of or use a separate goal horn, usually an Airchime, Kahlenberg, or Buell when their team scores. These aren't required, but are rather used as a celebration, and they are often unique to their team and easily identifiable. A notable example would be the recording that the Boston Bruins play which is used by many other teams.

=== Motorsports ===
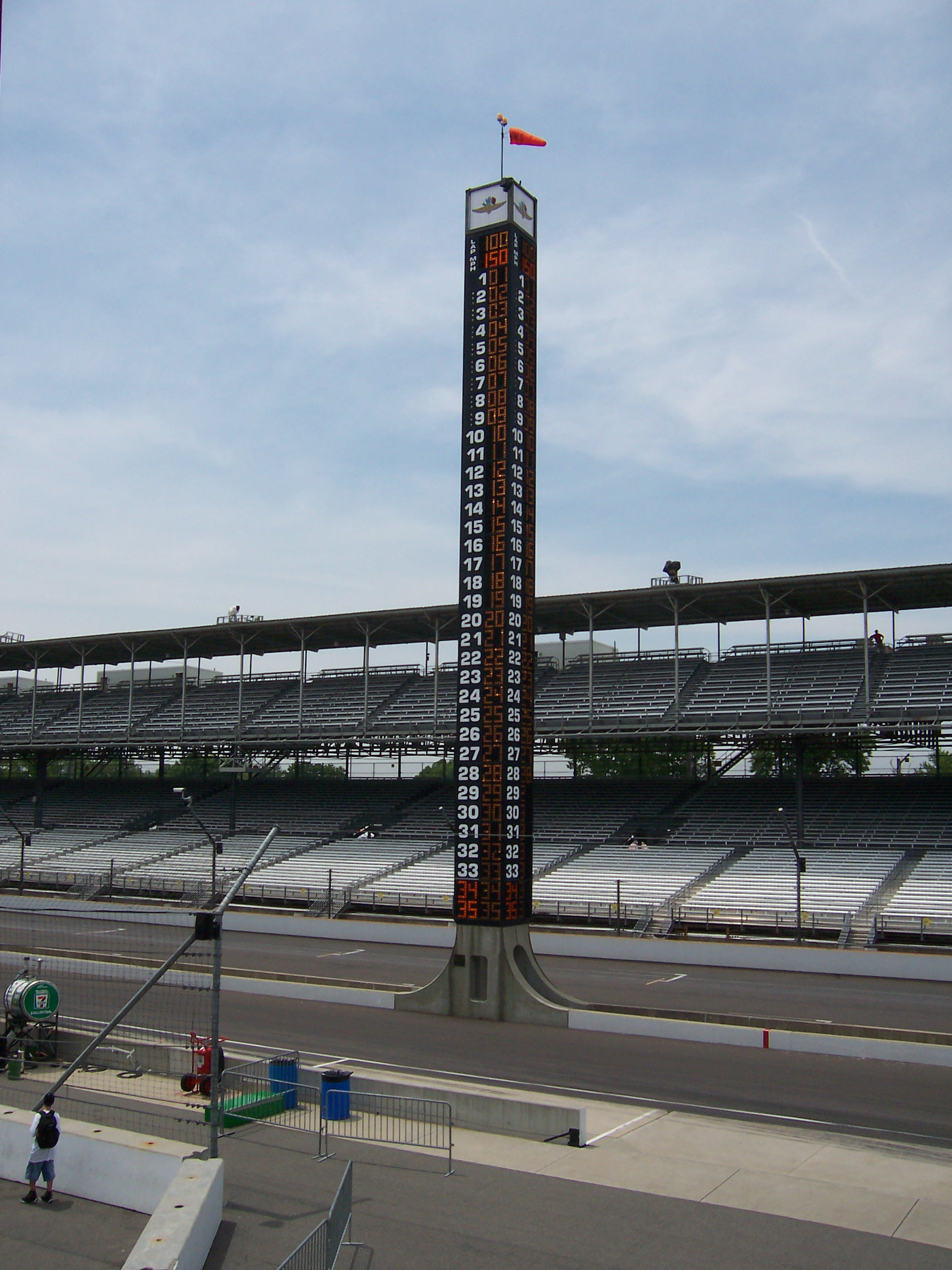
The Pylon at the Indianapolis Motor Speedway

In auto racing, the scoreboard typically displays the running order of the race, and number of laps completed. Some more complex boards scroll statistics such as average speed, laps behind, and timing reports.

=== Rugby football ===
All codes of rugby football have a game clock, the number of tries, penalties, field goals and conversions listed.

=== Track and field ===
In track and field there is usually an elapsed time display. Sometimes the team scores are displayed. Often in higher levels there is a variable message display next to each field event area that displays the standings and who is up next. Other indicators may show track side wind speed. In some settings where a track surrounds an athletic field, a track and field scoreboard may be combined within the football scoreboards.

=== Association football ===
An association football scoreboard usually shows the score for the home and away team, as well as the current match time. A board displaying the current stoppage time is usually held up by one of the match officials towards the end of the first and second half. The same board is also used to denote the jersey numbers of players coming in and leaving the game during a substitution, with the substitute's number appearing in green, while the leaving player is denoted in red.

Some amateur and youth levels will have the clock count down.

Some American venues will use a multi-purpose gridiron/soccer venue type scoreboard where various statistics are shown. Such may include either total fouls, corner kicks, shots on goal, or other important statistics for spectators to learn their team's overall performance.

=== Softball ===
Similar to baseball, a softball scoreboard will at the minimum show both team scores and the current inning. In addition, the number of balls, strikes and outs, and the number of hits and errors are often indicated.

=== Swimming ===
The scores for the meet, swimmer by lane, and their current placing, along with their race times are displayed on this type of board. The time display is most often in hundredths of a second, though thousandths may also be utilized.

=== Wrestling ===
Wrestling scoreboards will display the team scores, the current match time, the match score, and the weight class. Some scoreboards may also display riding time.

== Technology ==
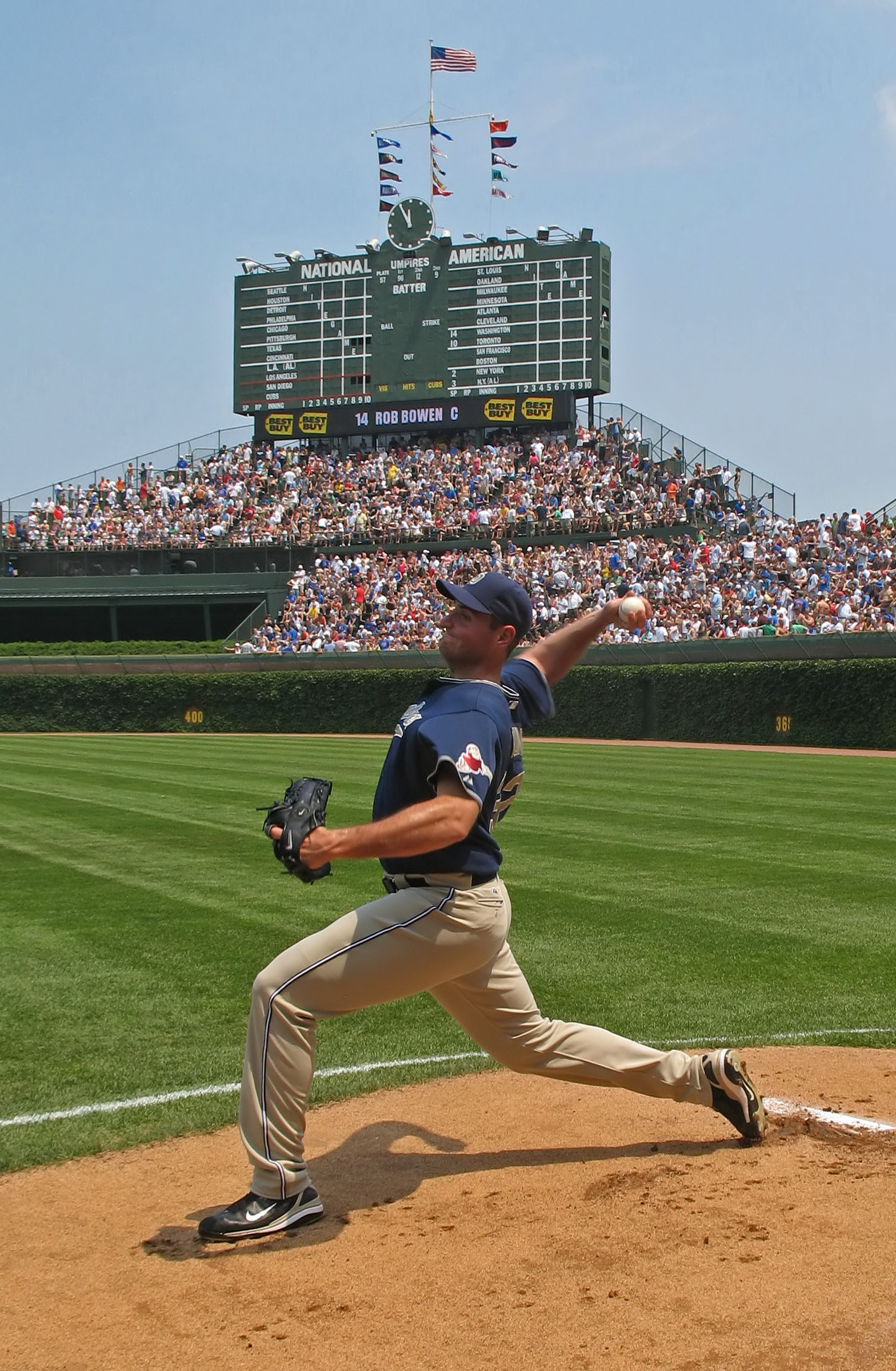
Wrigley Field uses a hand operated scoreboard, but added a video board at the bottom of it in 2004. The video board was removed in 2015 upon the building of video boards in right and left-center fields.

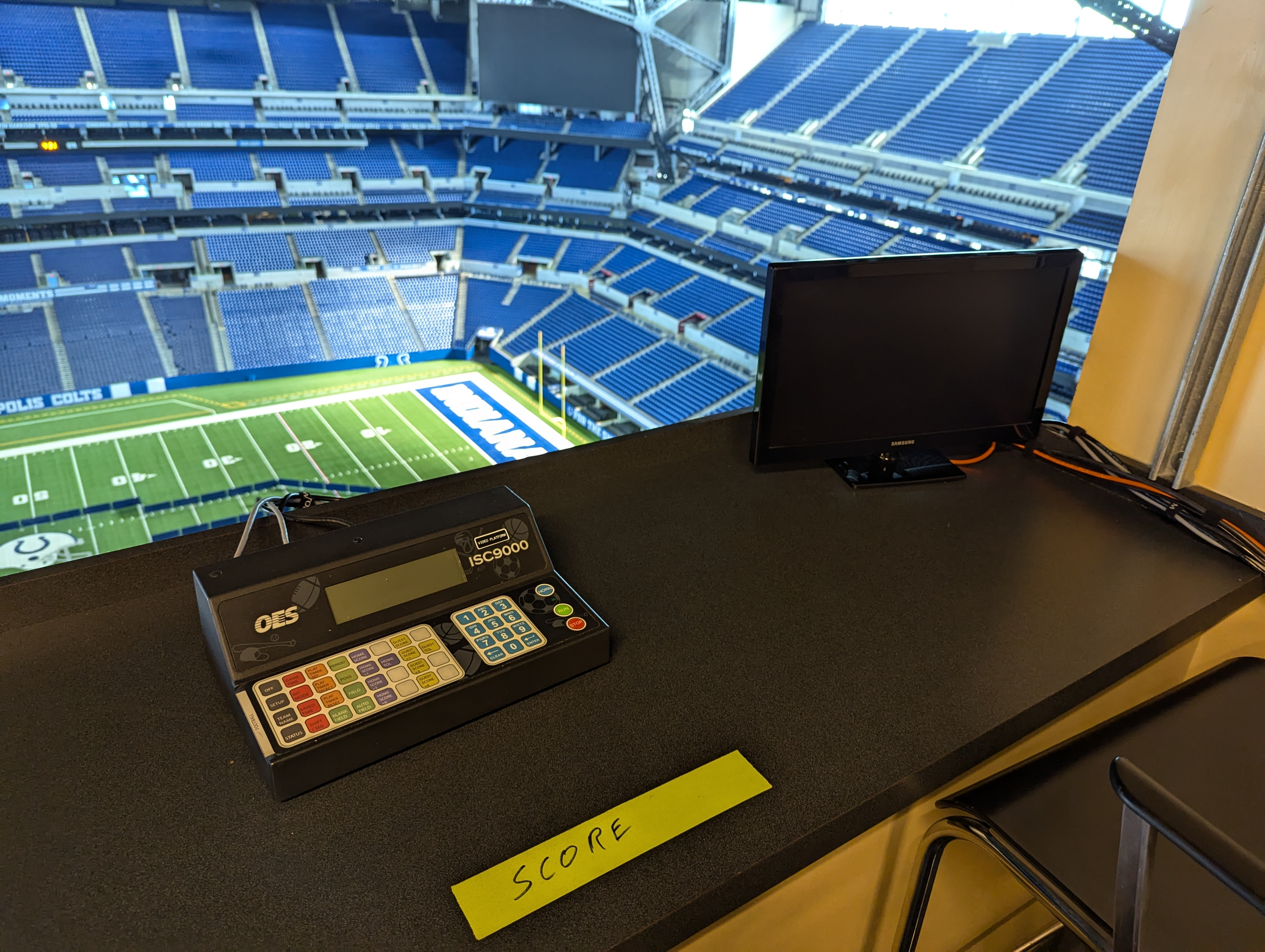
The scoreboard control panel in the video booth at Lucas Oil Stadium

Prior to the 1980s most electronic scoreboards were electro-mechanical. They contained relays or stepping switches controlling digits consisting of incandescent light bulbs. Beginning in the 1980s, advances in solid state electronics permitted major improvements in scoreboard technology. High power semiconductors such as thyristors and transistors replaced mechanical relays, light-emitting diodes first replaced light bulbs for indoor scoreboards and then, as their brightness increased, outdoor scoreboards. Light-emitting diodes last many times as long as light bulbs, are not subject to breakage, and are much more efficient at converting electrical energy to light. The newest light emitting diodes can last up to 100,000 hours before having to be replaced. Advances in large-scale integrated circuits permitted the introduction of computer control. This also made it cost effective to send the signals that control the operation of the scoreboard either through the existing AC wires providing power to the scoreboard or through the air. Powerline modems permit the digital control signals to be sent over the AC power lines. The most common method of sending digital data over power lines at rates less than 2400 bits per second is called frequency shift keying (FSK). Two radio frequencies represent binary 0 and 1. Radio transmission such as FSK sends data digitally. Until recently radio transmission was subject to short range and interference by other radio sources. A fairly recent technology called spread spectrum permits much more robust radio control of scoreboards. Spread spectrum, like the name implies, distributes the signal over a wide portion of the radio spectrum. This helps the signal resist interference which is usually confined to a narrow frequency band.

== Captioning requirements ==
Within the last few years most major league, professional and major college venues also include smaller displays featuring closed captioning of announcements from the public address system and advertisements displayed on the scoreboards to comply with the United States Americans with Disabilities Act of 1990 for the hard of hearing, and to allow distracted spectators to read what had been said.

== Video board animation ==
Most major sports facilities will use a video board and display graphics and fun videos relating to what is happening in the game. For instance, a home run may be depicted by an animation of a ball flying out to space. These animations are usually high in detail and are customized for the team that uses them. Most Major League Baseball facilities do their video editing on site in the press box; however, at Triple-A baseball stadiums most of it is done off site. Some teams have animators that create their own animations, while others have outside companies do the work for them.

== See also ==
- List of largest video screens
- Playograph
