= 100.000 =

100.000 may represent either:

- the number 100000 (the point being a thousands separator, as common in many European countries)
- the number 100 known to six significant figures, i.e. 100±0.0005 (here the dot is a decimal separator, as commonly used in much of the English-speaking world)

== See also ==
- 100000 (disambiguation)
