= Playograph =

Machine scoreboard

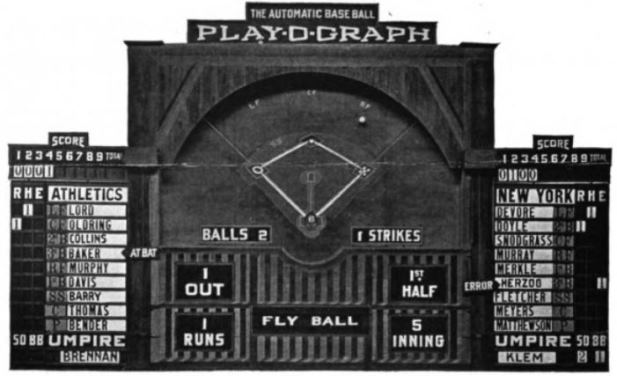
- The Play-o-Graph
- Type: Mechanical/electrical scoreboard
- Inventor: Baseball Playograph Company
- Manufacturer: Baseball Playograph Company

The Playograph was a machine or an electric scoreboard used to transmit the details of a baseball game in the era before television. It is approximated by the "gamecast" feature on some sports web sites: it had a reproduction of a baseball diamond, with an inning-by-inning scoreboard, each team's lineup, and it simulated each pitch: a ball, a strike, a hit, an out, and so on.

A telegraph operator, who was watching the game live, transmitted the details of the baseball game to the two people operating the Playograph. An "X" on the diamond represented a runner; an "O" was displayed if the runner got out. A ball was moved animatronically to show fastballs or curveballs, where it was hit, and so on.

== Development ==
The invention of the Playograph is attributed to the Connecticut-based Baseball Playograph Company, which manufactured this mechanical device as a product. Several innovations were introduced later on such as its shift from mechanical to electronic and the use of colored lights to indicate players, their position on the field, and whether the batter was safe or out.

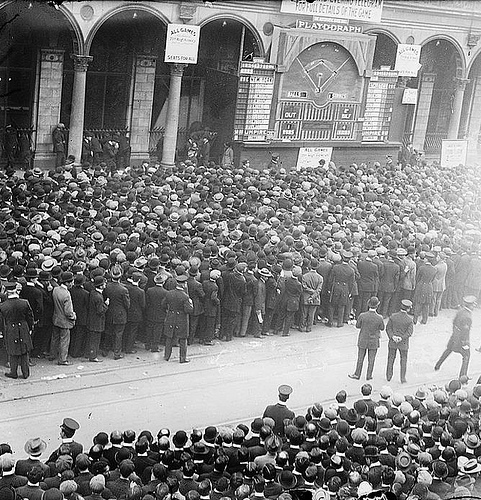
Playograph during the 1911 World Series at Herald Square in New York City.

Newspapers usually used Playograph especially when covering the World Series. One of the earliest of these was the World Series of 1911. The Scranton Times, for instance, set one up at Spruce Street side of the Times building. An account also cited an installation by The San Diego Sun and described the Playograph as "imposing in size and appearance, readable from a distance and as clear to understand as a first grader."

The Playograph also became a regular social event as people attended the display in large numbers and there are those who even paid as much as 50 cents per game to witness the live updates. It was mounted in the sides of the building, auditorium, grandstands, parking lots, opera houses, theaters, or on the street. There are even cases where operators moved it around different venues to accommodate overflowing crowds.

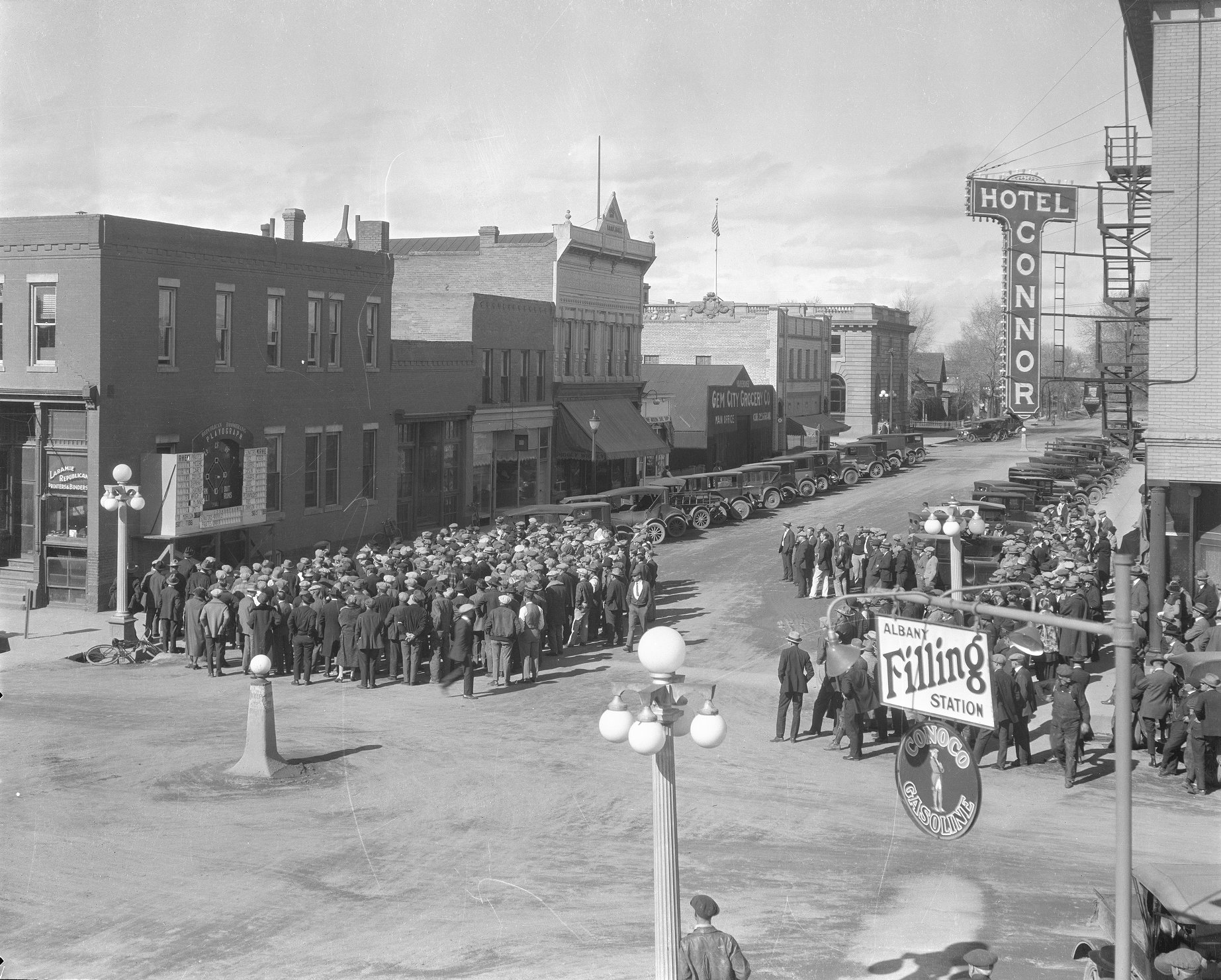
A playograph (left) in use in 1925 in Laramie, Wyoming

A similar contraption called the "Gridgraph," was used for football games. It was also produced by the Playograph Company of Stamford. The popularity of the Playograph declined after the emergence of the radio stations, which began airing the live broadcast of baseball games.
