= $100,000 infield =

Infield of the Philadelphia Athletics in the early 1910s

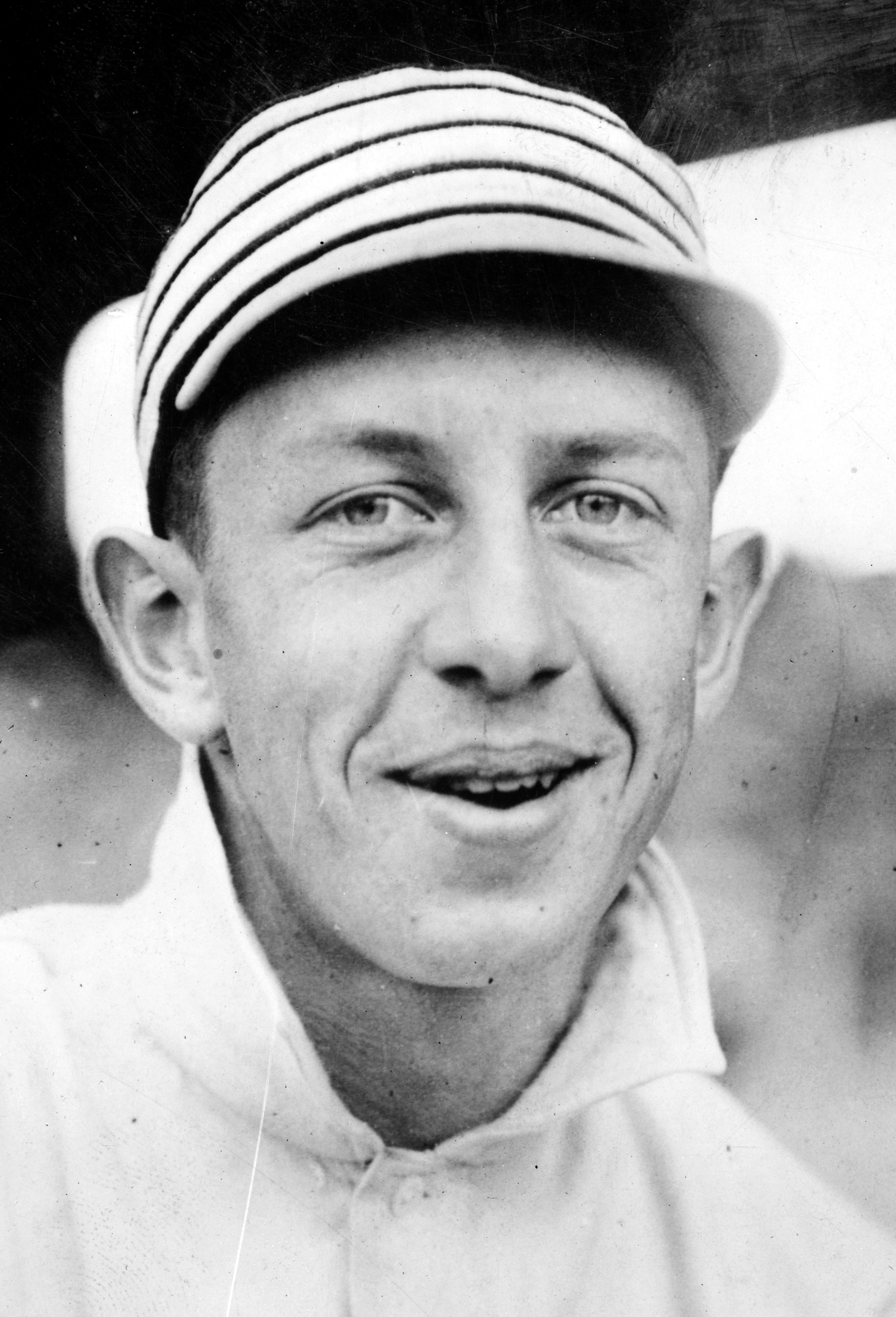
$100,000 infield second baseman Eddie Collins

The $100,000 infield was the infield of the Philadelphia Athletics in the early 1910s. The $100,000 infield consisted of first baseman Stuffy McInnis, second baseman Eddie Collins, shortstop Jack Barry and third baseman Frank "Home Run" Baker. According to the Encyclopædia Britannica, the nickname reflects "the purported combined market value of the foursome", which is equivalent to about $2.44 million in 2024.

Baseball historian Bill James rated the 1914 edition of the $100,000 infield the greatest infield of all time, and also ranked the 1912 and 1913 editions in the top five all time. The $100,000 infield helped the Athletics win four American League championships in five years—1910, 1911, 1913 and 1914—and win the World Series in 1910, 1911 and 1913. The group was broken up after losing the 1914 World Series as a result of the financial pressures resulting from the emergence of the Federal League. Two members—Collins and Baker—have been inducted into the Baseball Hall of Fame.

== Eddie Collins ==
Collins was the first member of the $100,000 infield to join the Athletics. He debuted on September 17, 1906, after playing college ball at Columbia University. In 1906 and 1907, he played 20 games for the Athletics, mostly at shortstop. In 1908, he took over as the Athletics' regular second baseman, replacing Danny Murphy, who moved to the outfield. During the $100,000 infield years from 1910 to 1914, he played 738 games, getting 922 hits in 2,677 at bats for a batting average of .344. He led the American League in runs in 1912, 1913 and 1914, stolen bases in 1910, singles in 1913 and times on base in 1914. He also finished in the top ten in the American League in batting average, on-base percentage, hits, stolen bases, singles and times on base every year from 1910 through 1914. In addition, he finished in the top ten in American Most Valuable Player voting every year from 1911 through 1914, winning the Most Valuable Player award in 1914. He was sold to the Chicago White Sox after the 1914 season as Athletics' manager Connie Mack attempted to respond to the financial pressures brought on by the newly formed Federal League, breaking up the $100,000 infield. He returned to Mack and the Athletics in 1927, finishing his career playing 12 games for the Athletics in their 1929 and 1930 World Championship seasons. He was elected to the Hall of Fame in 1939.

== Jack Barry ==
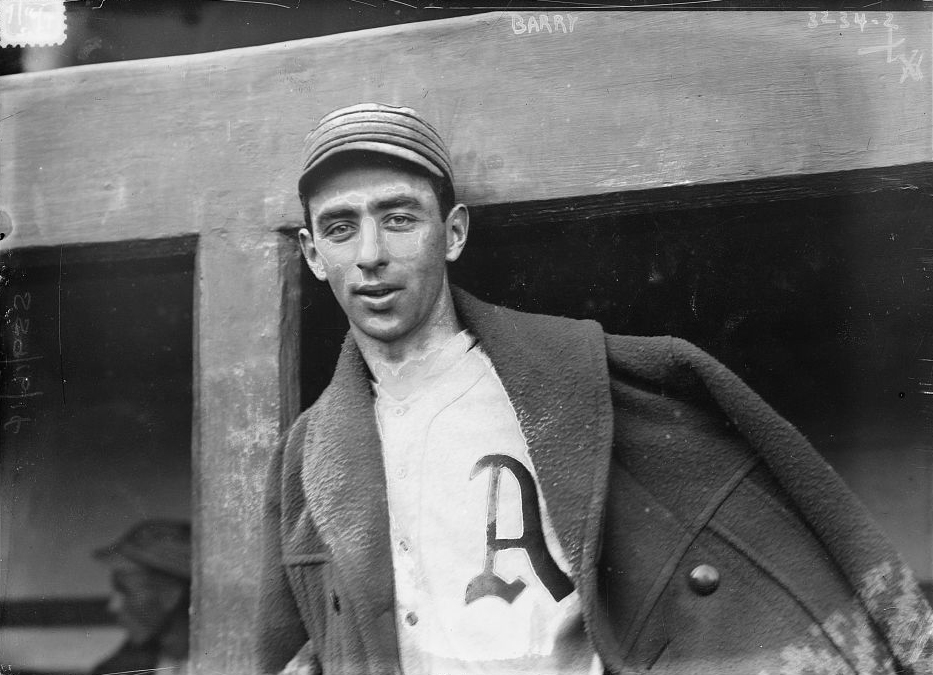
Jack Barry, $100,000 infield shortstop

Barry was the next to join the Athletics, debuting on July 13, 1908, after playing for the College of the Holy Cross. Between 1910 and 1914, Barry played 686 games for the Athletics, getting 607 hits in 2,334 at bats for a batting average of .260. He finished in the American League top ten in sacrifice hits every year from 1911 through 1914, and ranked fifth in the American League in runs batted in in 1913. But his primary contributions were on defense, where he had a strong arm, enormous range and sure hands, and was able to work out innovative plays with his good friend Collins, such as a defense against the double steal. He finished in the top 20 in Most Valuable Player voting every year from 1911 through 1914, with his best showing a ninth-place finish in 1913. He was sold to the Boston Red Sox in the middle of the 1915 season, where he moved to second base and played on the Red Sox' 1915 and 1916 World Championship teams. He missed the Red Sox 1918 Championship season due to service in the U.S. Navy.

== Frank "Home Run" Baker ==
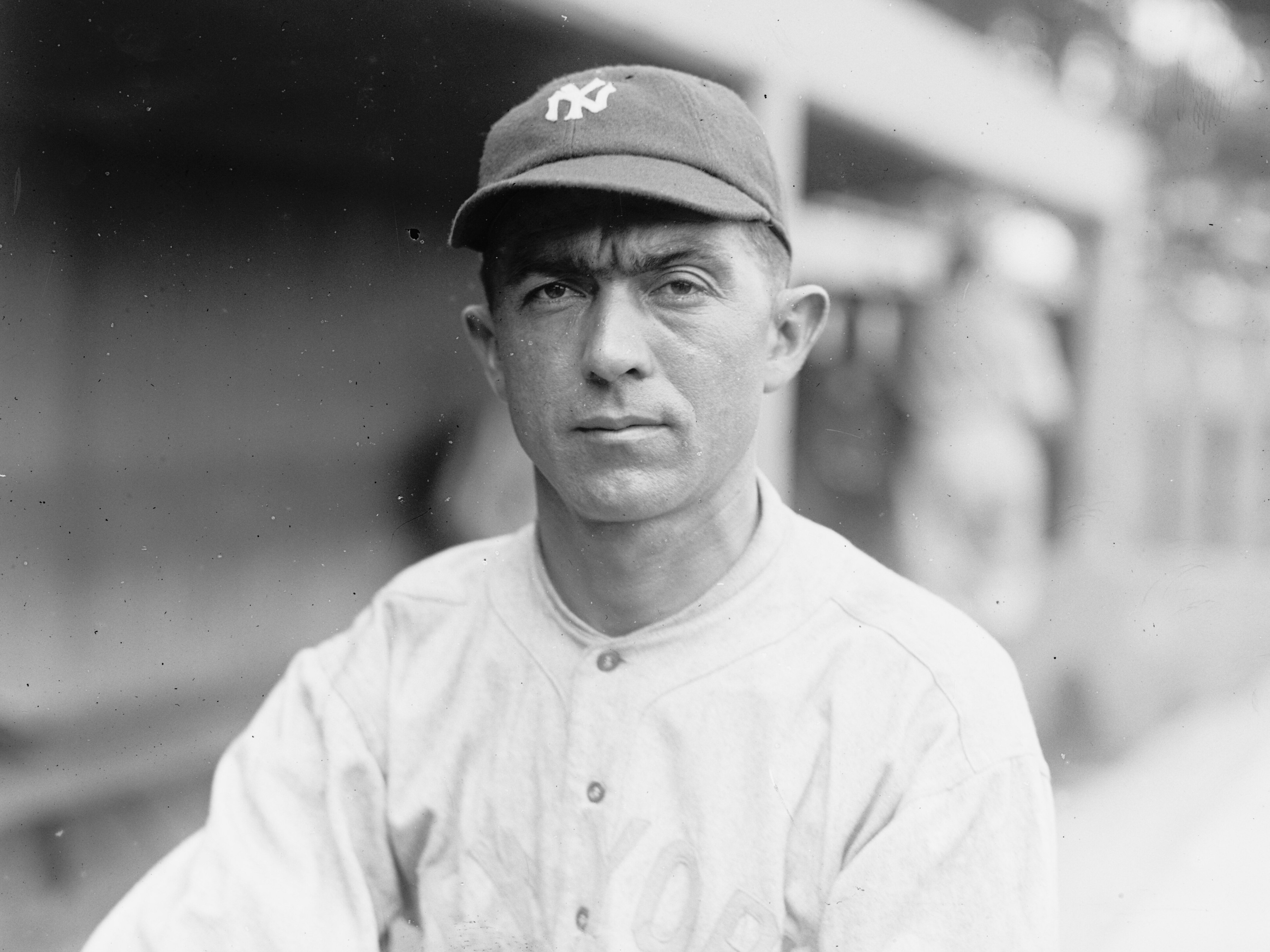
Frank Baker, the $100,000 infield's third baseman

Baker also joined the Athletics in 1908, debuting on September 21. He became the Athletics regular third baseman in 1909, and led the American League in triples that season. Between 1910 and 1914, Baker played 742 games for the Athletics, getting 929 hits in 2,864 at bats for a batting average of .324. He led the American League in home runs every year from 1911 through 1914, and led the league in runs batted in during 1912 and 1913. He also finished in the top ten in batting average, slugging percentage, on-base percentage and times on base every year from 1911 through 1914, and finished in the top ten in runs scored, hits, doubles, total bases, extra base hits and runs batted in every year from 1910 through 1914. He finished in the top ten in the American League Most Valuable Player voting every year from 1911 through 1914, finishing third in 1914, his highest showing. Baker was the hero of the 1911 World Series, hitting two home runs to help the Athletics win the series, which earned him the nickname "Home Run" Baker. Baker held out the 1915 season when manager and owner Connie Mack refused to increase his salary, and was sold to the New York Yankees in 1916 after American League president Ban Johnson intervened. He finished his career as the third baseman for the Yankees pennant-winning teams in 1921 and 1922. Baker was elected to the Hall of Fame in 1955.

== Stuffy McInnis ==
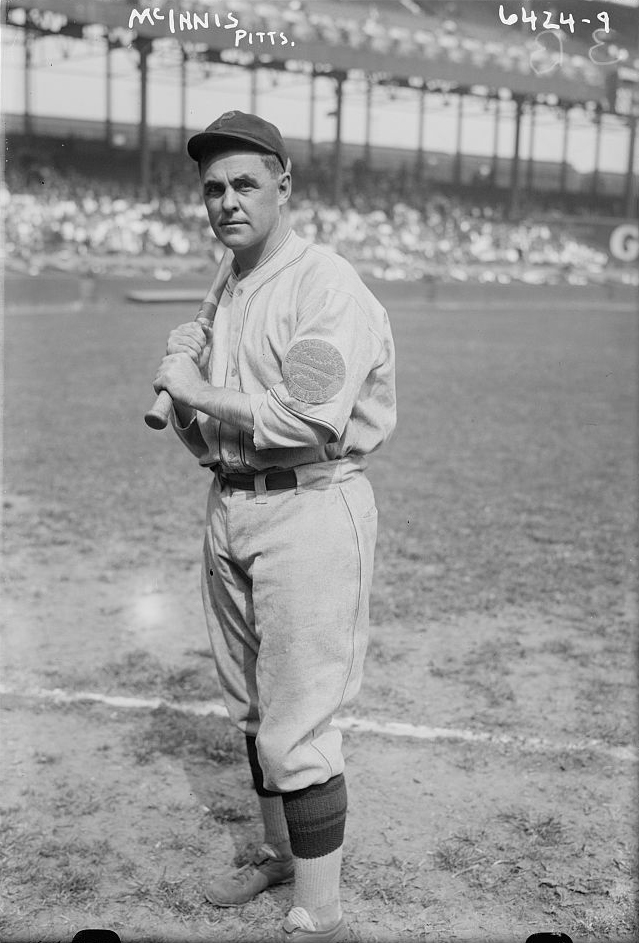
First baseman Stuffy McInnis

McInnis was the final member of the $100,000 infield to join. He started his career as an 18-year-old little-used backup infielder for the Athletics in 1909, and played a little more in 1910. In 1909 and 1910, he played more games backing up Barry at shortstop than at any other position. Before the 1911 season, Mack decided to make McInnis his regular first baseman, replacing the popular veteran Harry Davis, although McInnis did have to begin the season as the Athletics' shortstop when Barry became ill before taking over at first base. Defensively as a first baseman, he was known for having exceptional reach. Between 1910 and 1914, McInnis played 614 games for the Athletics, getting 715 hits in 2,228 at bats for a batting average of .321. He led the American League in singles in 1914, and finished in the top ten in batting average, hits, total bases, runs batted in and singles every year from 1912 through 1914. In both 1912 and 1913, he also finished in the top ten in slugging percentage and on-base percentage. He received Most Valuable Player votes every season from 1911 through 1914, finishing seventh in both 1913 and 1914. McInnis is the only member of the $100,000 infield to remain with the Athletics beyond 1915. He was eventually traded to the Boston Red Sox in 1918 in exchange for Larry Gardner, Hick Cady and Tilly Walker, where he played on Boston's 1918 World Championship team. He also reteamed with Barry on the 1919 Boston Red Sox. Before finishing his career in 1927 he also played with the Cleveland Indians, Boston Braves, Pittsburgh Pirates and Philadelphia Phillies.

== See also ==
- Whiz Kids
