= 1911 World Series =

1911 Major League Baseball championship series

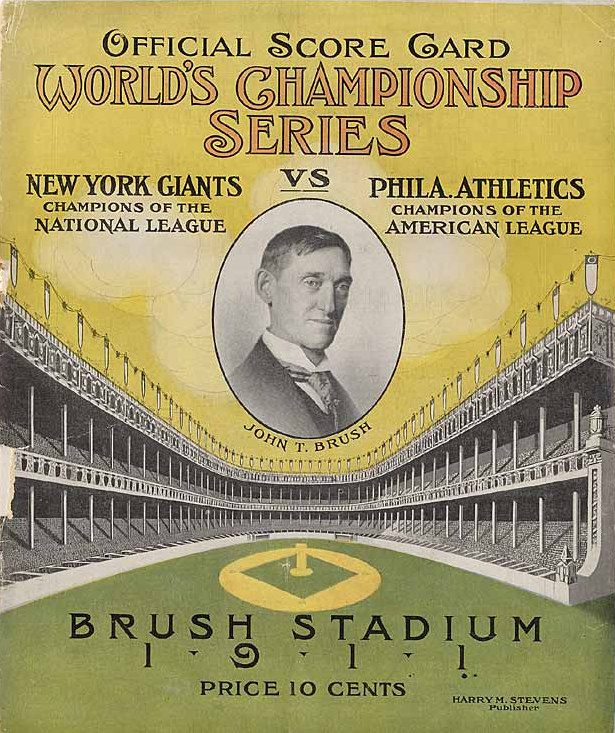
Team (Wins)	Managers	Season
Philadelphia Athletics (4)	Connie Mack	101–50, .669, GA: 13 1/2
New York Giants (2)	John McGraw	99–54, .647, GA: 7 1/2
- Dates: October 14–26
- Venue(s): Brush Stadium (New York); Shibe Park (Philadelphia)
- MVP: Eddie Collins (Philadelphia)
- Umpires: Bill Klem (NL), Tommy Connolly (AL), Bill Brennan (NL), Bill Dinneen (AL)
- Hall of Famers: Umpires: Bill Klem; Tommy Connolly; Athletics: Connie Mack (manager); Frank Baker; Chief Bender; Eddie Collins; Eddie Plank; Giants: John McGraw (manager); Rube Marquard; Christy Mathewson

The 1911 World Series was the championship series in Major League Baseball for the 1911 season. The eighth edition of the World Series, it matched the American League (AL) champion Philadelphia Athletics against the National League (NL) champion New York Giants. The Athletics won the best-of-seven series four games to two, in a rematch of the 1905 World Series, getting revenge over the Giants, who had won in their previous meeting.

Philadelphia third baseman Frank "Home Run" Baker earned his nickname during this Series. His home run in Game 2 off Rube Marquard was the margin of victory for the Athletics, and his blast in Game 3 off Christy Mathewson tied that game in the ninth inning, and the Athletics eventually won in the 11th. The Giants never recovered. Ironically, Mathewson (or his ghostwriter) had criticized Marquard in his newspaper column after Game 2 for giving up the gopher ball, only to fall victim himself the very next day. Baker was swinging a hot bat in general, going 9 for 24 to lead all batters in the Series with a .375 average.

According to his obituary in The New York Times (July 28, 1971), Giants catcher Chief Meyers threw out 12 runners, creating a record for the most assists by a catcher during the World Series.

The six consecutive days of rain between Games 3 and 4 caused the longest delay between World Series games until the earthquake-interrupted 1989 World Series (which incidentally featured the same two franchises, albeit on the West Coast, and which also resulted in an A's victory over the Giants). With the sixth and final game being played on October 26, this was also the latest-ending World Series by calendar date until 1981.

This was the second time in World Series history that two teams met in a World Series rematch. The first time was when the Chicago Cubs and Detroit Tigers met in consecutive years, in 1907 and 1908. This is also the first World Series to feature two teams that had previously won a title. The Athletics were the defending champions while the Giants had won in 1905.

== Summary ==
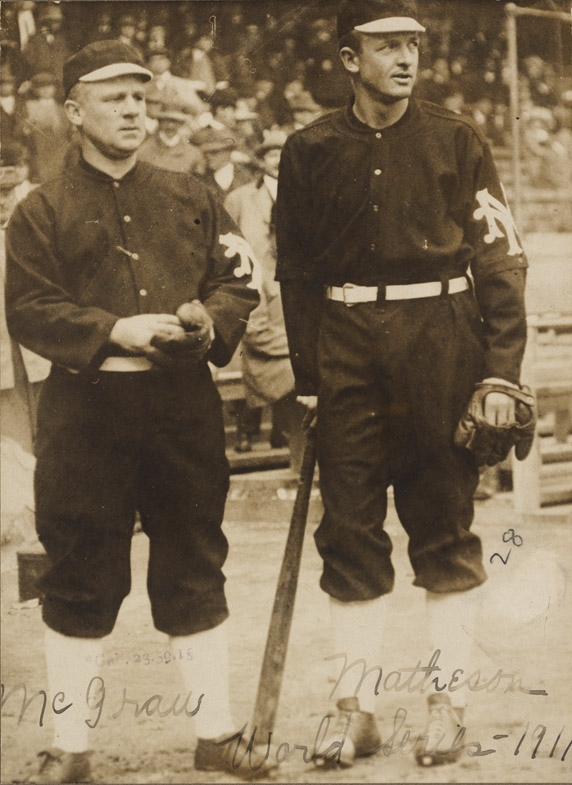
John McGraw and Christy Mathewson during the 1911 World Series

AL Philadelphia Athletics (4) vs. NL New York Giants (2)

Game	Date	Score	Location	Time	Attendance
1	October 14	Philadelphia Athletics – 1, New York Giants – 2	Brush Stadium	2:12	38,281
2	October 16	New York Giants – 1, Philadelphia Athletics – 3	Shibe Park	1:52	26,286
3	October 17	Philadelphia Athletics – 3, New York Giants – 2 (11)	Brush Stadium	2:25	37,216
4	October 24	New York Giants – 2, Philadelphia Athletics – 4	Shibe Park	1:49	24,355
5	October 25	Philadelphia Athletics – 3, New York Giants – 4 (10)	Brush Stadium	2:33	33,228
6	October 26	New York Giants – 2, Philadelphia Athletics – 13	Shibe Park	2:12	20,485

== Matchups ==
=== Game 1 ===
1911 Series: Hot ticket at Shibe Park

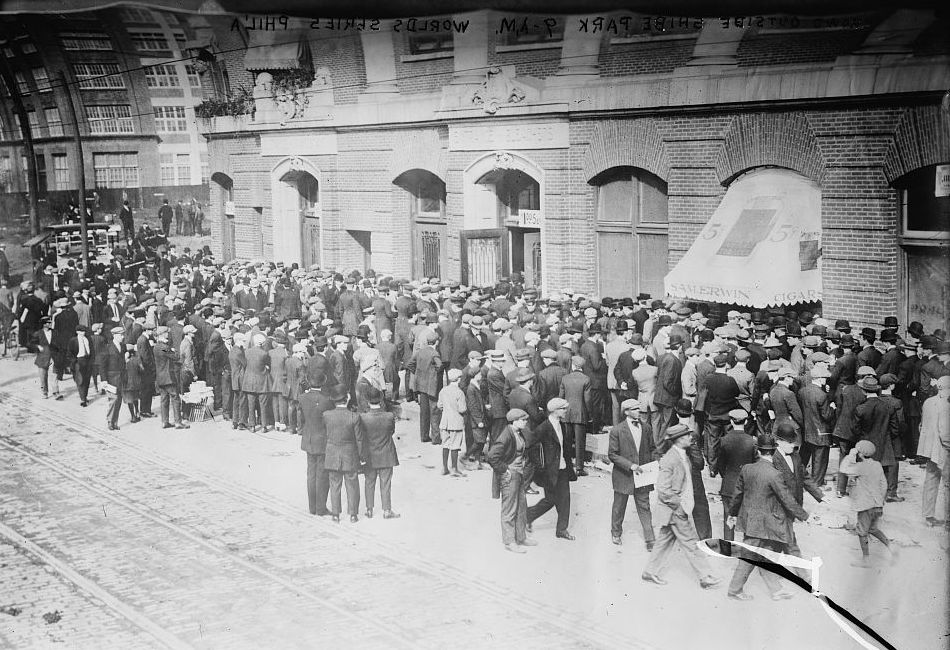
The head of the line: early risers at 9 am at the Shibe Park box office at 21st and Lehigh...

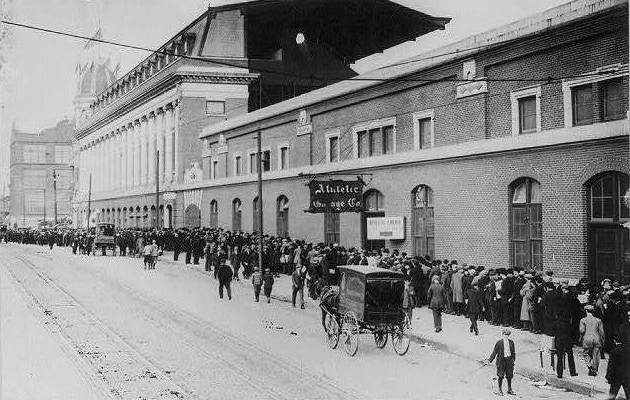
...and the tail: the less punctual fans line up down Lehigh, beyond the end of the grandstand

Saturday, October 14, 1911 2:00 pm (ET) at Brush Stadium in Manhattan, New York
Team	1	2	3	4	5	6	7	8	9	R	H	E
Philadelphia	0	1	0	0	0	0	0	0	0	1	6	2
New York	0	0	0	1	0	0	1	0	X	2	5	0
WP: Christy Mathewson (1–0) LP: Chief Bender (0–1)

With a perfect top of the first, Christy Mathewson set the record with 28 straight shutout innings in World Series play, a record that would be broken by Boston Red Sox's Babe Ruth with 29 2/3 innings in the 1918 World Series. Mathewson's postseason record for consecutive scoreless innings against one team would not be broken until 2013 when the Detroit Tigers' Justin Verlander shut out the Athletics (now playing in Oakland) for 30 consecutive innings in the 2012 and 2013 ALDS.

=== Game 2 ===
Monday, October 16, 1911 2:00 pm (ET) at Shibe Park in Philadelphia, Pennsylvania
Team	1	2	3	4	5	6	7	8	9	R	H	E
New York	0	1	0	0	0	0	0	0	0	1	5	3
Philadelphia	1	0	0	0	0	2	0	0	X	3	4	0
WP: Eddie Plank (1–0) LP: Rube Marquard (0–1); Home runs: NYG: None; PHA: Home Run Baker (1)

With the score tied at 1 and with Eddie Collins on second, Frank Baker blasted a two-run home run off Rube Marquard to deep right field for the go ahead score and the Athletics held on to win game 2, 3–1.

=== Game 3 ===
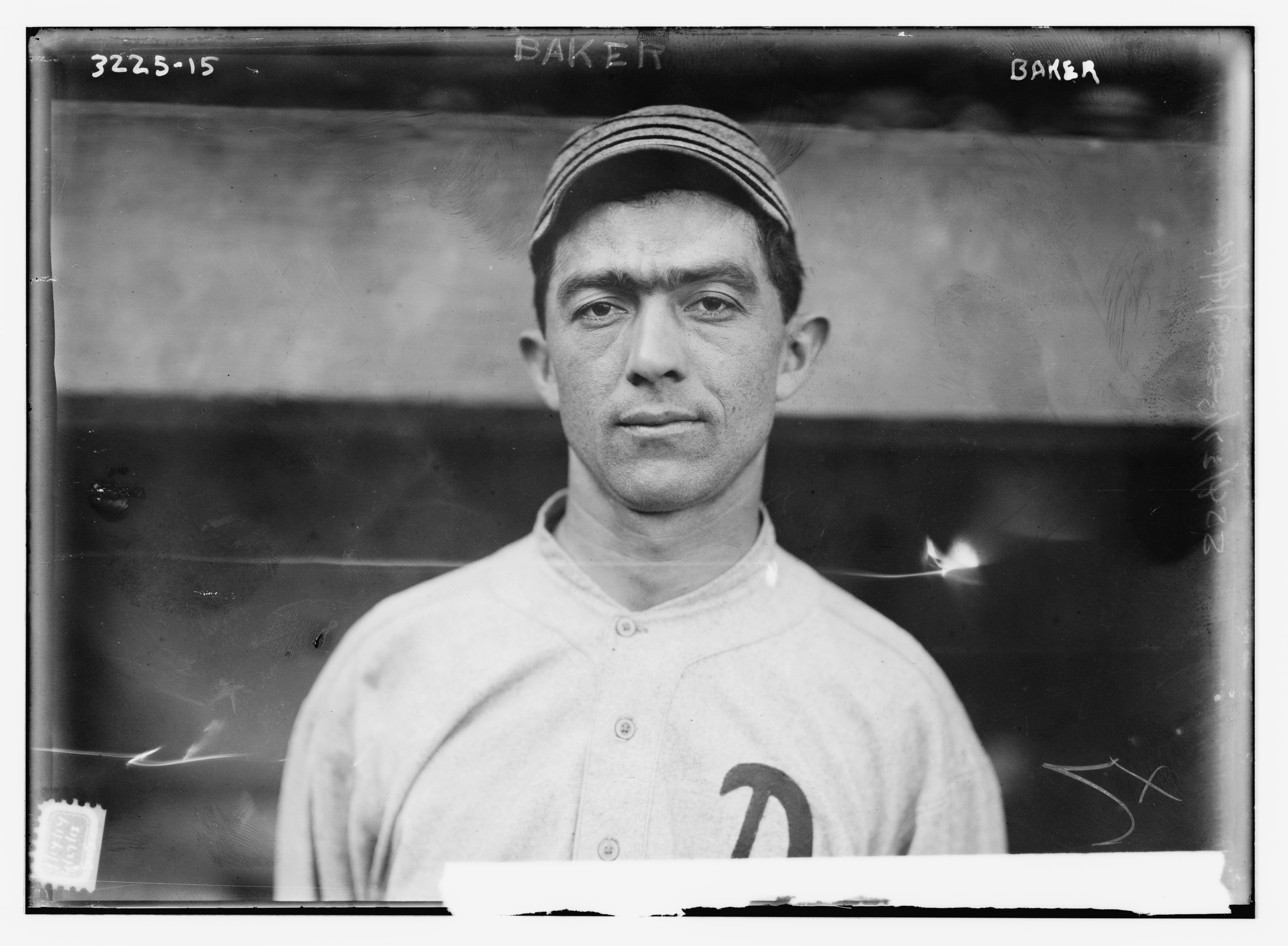
Frank Baker in 1913

Tuesday, October 17, 1911 2:00 pm (ET) at Brush Stadium in Manhattan, New York
Team	1	2	3	4	5	6	7	8	9	10	11	R	H	E
Philadelphia	0	0	0	0	0	0	0	0	1	0	2	3	9	1
New York	0	0	1	0	0	0	0	0	0	0	1	2	3	5
WP: Jack Coombs (1–0) LP: Christy Mathewson (1–1); Home runs: PHA: Home Run Baker (2); NYG: None

With the Giants up 1–0 going into the ninth with Mathewson on the mound, it appeared the series was going to be 2–1 New York. But with one out, Baker stepped up to the plate and blasted his second home run in as many games to tie it at 1. Thus, the nickname "Home Run" Baker was born. Two innings later with the score still tied at 1, Baker singled and scored on an error to make it 3–1. The Giants rallied for one run in the bottom half but the game ended with a runner being thrown out on a stolen base attempt.

=== Game 4 ===
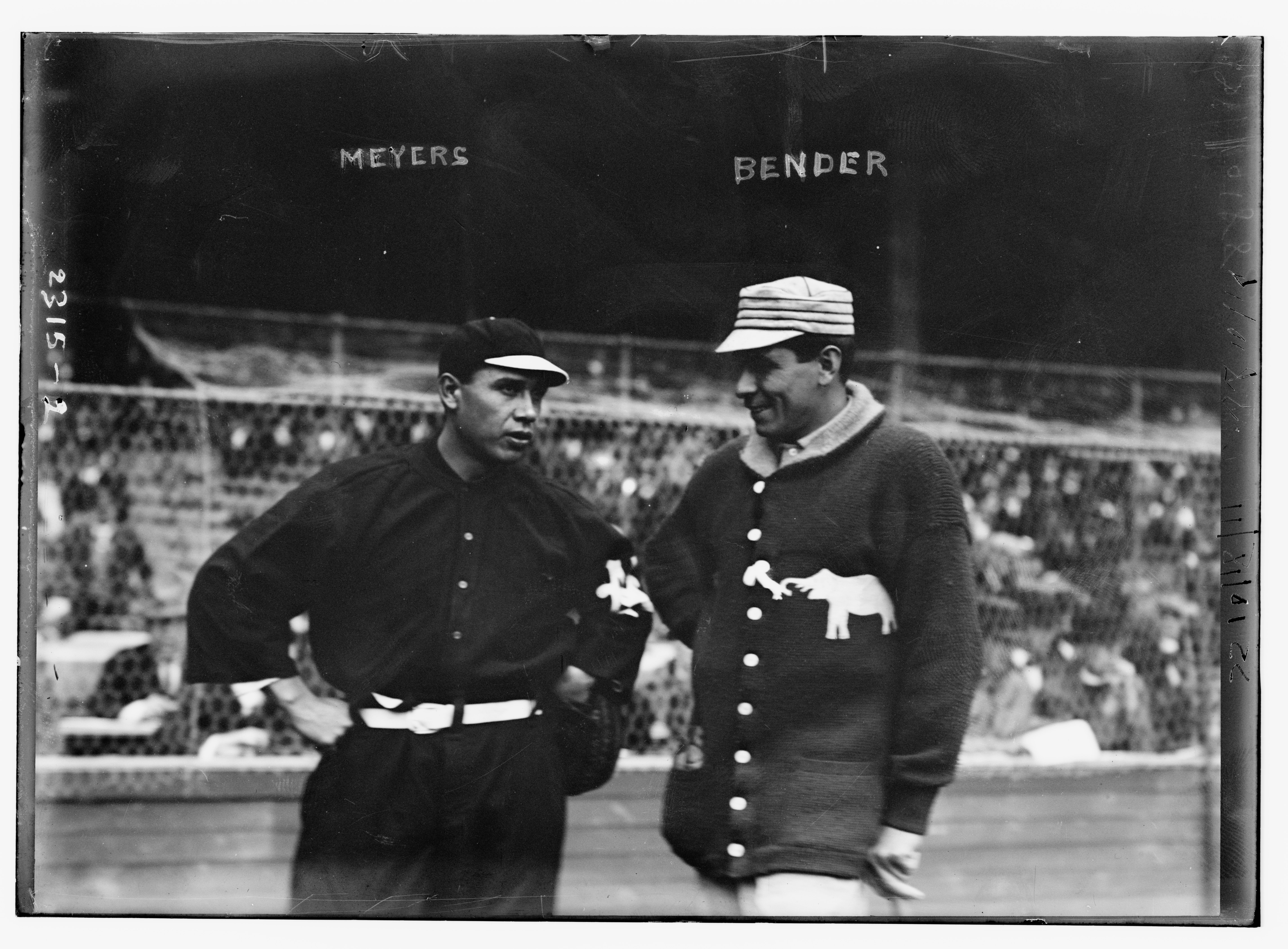
Chief Meyers and Chief Bender during the 1911 World Series

Tuesday, October 24, 1911 2:00 pm (ET) at Shibe Park in Philadelphia, Pennsylvania
Team	1	2	3	4	5	6	7	8	9	R	H	E
New York	2	0	0	0	0	0	0	0	0	2	7	3
Philadelphia	0	0	0	3	1	0	0	0	X	4	11	1
WP: Chief Bender (1–1) LP: Christy Mathewson (1–2)

After six days of rain, the series resumed. Chief Bender, after giving up two runs in the first, shut out the Giants the rest of the way on his way to a 4–2 win and 3–1 series lead.

=== Game 5 ===
Wednesday, October 25, 1911 2:00 pm (ET) at Brush Stadium in Manhattan, New York
Team	1	2	3	4	5	6	7	8	9	10	R	H	E
Philadelphia	0	0	3	0	0	0	0	0	0	0	3	7	1
New York	0	0	0	0	0	0	1	0	2	1	4	9	2
WP: Doc Crandall (1–0) LP: Eddie Plank (1–1); Home runs: PHA: Rube Oldring (1); NYG: None

On the verge of elimination, the Giants fought back. They tied it at 3 with two runs in the bottom of the ninth, with Josh Devore became the first player to get a game-tying hit in the World Series with his team one out from elimination to help send it to extra innings. He was the first and only player to accomplish this feat until Otis Nixon did so 81 years later in the 1992 World Series. In the tenth inning, Larry Doyle hit a leadoff double for the Giants, and he soon advanced to third base on a bunt by Fred Snodgrass. After a shallow flyout, the next batter in Fred Merkle hit a deep fly ball to right field that was enough for Doyle to score the winning run, making it the first ever World Series game to end on a sacrifice fly.

Home plate umpire Bill Klem later said Doyle had failed to touch home plate after sliding in. Since none of the Athletics noticed this and Philadelphia failed to appeal, Klem had to let the winning run stand.

=== Game 6 ===
Thursday, October 26, 1911 2:00 pm (ET) at Shibe Park in Philadelphia, Pennsylvania
Team	1	2	3	4	5	6	7	8	9	R	H	E
New York	1	0	0	0	0	0	0	0	1	2	4	3
Philadelphia	0	0	1	4	0	1	7	0	X	13	13	5
WP: Chief Bender (2–1) LP: Red Ames (0–1)

Bender threw a 4-hitter to clinch the series, the Athletics second consecutive World Series title. The A's pitching staff held the Giants to a .175 team batting average, lowest ever for a 6-game series.

== Composite line score ==
1911 World Series (4–2): Philadelphia Athletics (A.L.) over New York Giants (N.L.)

Team	1	2	3	4	5	6	7	8	9	10	11	R	H	E
Philadelphia Athletics	1	1	4	7	1	3	7	0	1	0	2	27	50	10
New York Giants	3	1	1	1	0	0	2	0	3	1	1	13	33	16
Total attendance: 179,851 Average attendance: 29,975; Winning player's share: $3,655 Losing player's share: $2,436

== See also ==
- Playograph – photo during 1911 World Series game
