= Eddie Collins =

American baseball player (1887–1951)

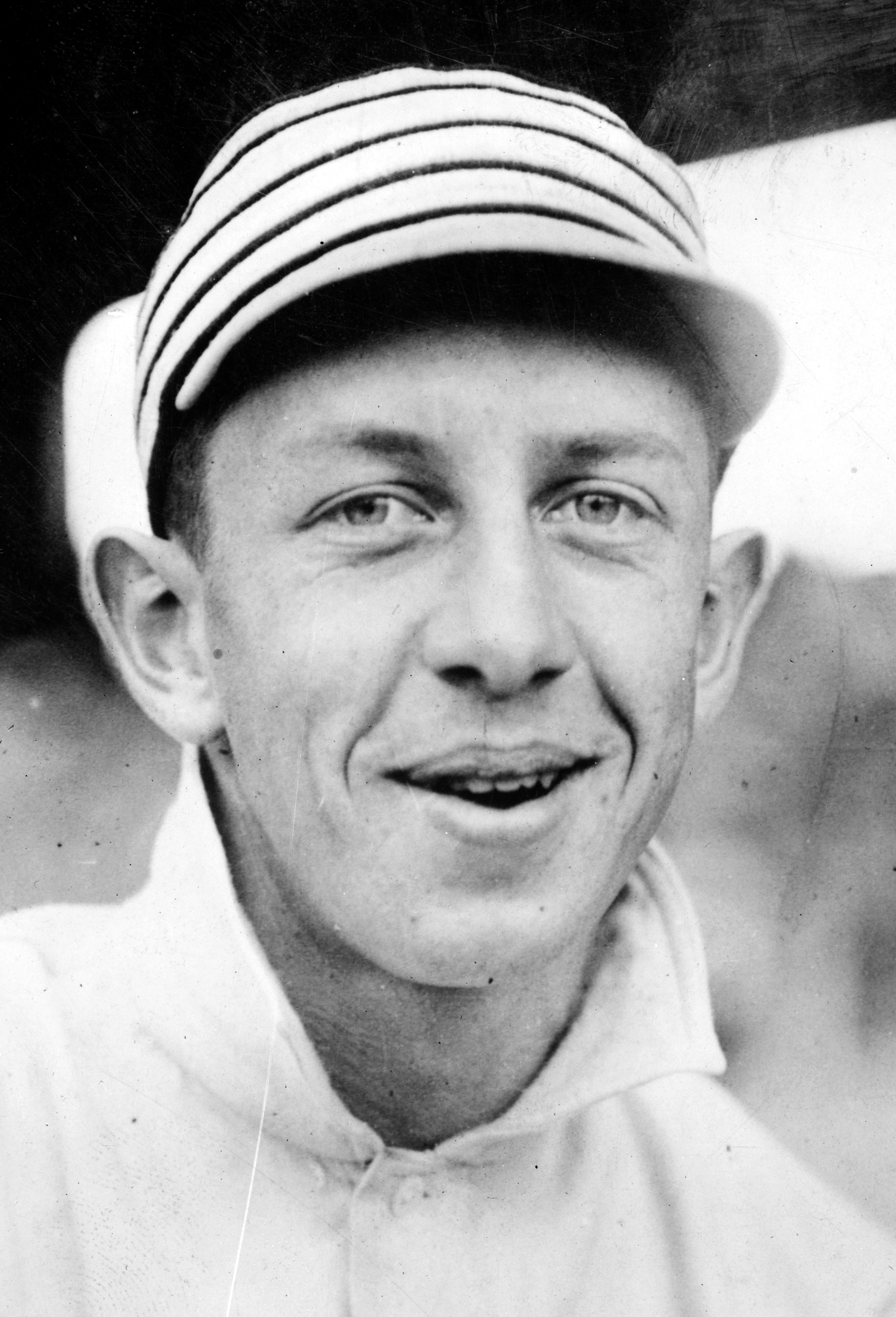
- Collins with the Philadelphia Athletics in 1911
- Second baseman / Manager
- Born: May 2, 1887; Millerton, New York, U.S.
- Died: March 25, 1951 (aged 63); Boston, Massachusetts, U.S.
- Batted: Left Threw: Right

MLB debut
- September 17, 1906, for the Philadelphia Athletics

Last MLB appearance
- August 2, 1930, for the Philadelphia Athletics

MLB statistics
- Batting average: .333
- Hits: 3,315
- Home runs: 47
- Runs batted in: 1,300
- Stolen bases: 745
- Managerial record: 174–160
- Winning %: .521
- Stats at Baseball Reference
- Managerial record at Baseball Reference

Teams
- As player: Philadelphia Athletics (1906–1914); Chicago White Sox (1915–1926); Philadelphia Athletics (1927–1930); As manager: Chicago White Sox (1924–1926)

Career highlights and awards
- 6× World Series champion (1910, 1911, 1913, 1917, 1929, 1930); AL MVP (1914); 4× AL stolen base leader (1910, 1919, 1923, 1924); Philadelphia Baseball Wall of Fame; Athletics Hall of Fame; Boston Red Sox Hall of Fame

Member of the National

Baseball Hall of Fame
- Induction: 1939
- Vote: 77.7% (fourth ballot)

Edward Trowbridge Collins Sr. (May 2, 1887 – March 25, 1951), nicknamed "Cocky", was an American professional baseball player, manager and executive. He played as a second baseman in Major League Baseball from 1906 to 1930 for the Philadelphia Athletics and Chicago White Sox. A graduate of Columbia University, Collins holds major league career records in several categories and is among the top few players in several other categories. In 1925, Collins became just the sixth person to join the 3,000 hit club – and the last for the next 17 seasons. His 47 career home runs are the fewest of any player with 3,000 hits. Collins is the only non-Yankee to win five or more World Series titles with the same club as a player. He is also the only player to have been a member of all five World Series championships won by the Athletics during the franchise's time in Philadelphia.

Collins coached and managed in the major leagues after retiring as a player. He also served as general manager of the Boston Red Sox. In 1939, Collins was inducted into the Baseball Hall of Fame.

== Early life ==
Edward Trowbridge Collins Sr. was born on May 2, 1887, in Millerton, New York, a 384-acre village in Dutchess County.

== College career ==
Collins was an Ivy League graduate who was notable for his offensive skill set and base-stealing capabilities. He graduated from Columbia University (where he was a member of Beta Theta Pi fraternity) at a time when few major league players had attended college.

Collins started his professional baseball career on September 17, 1906, when he signed with the Philadelphia Athletics' organization at the age of 19. At the time of his signing, Collins was still a student at Columbia, and he played some of his early minor league games under the last name of Sullivan so that he could protect his collegiate status. Collins had lost his collegiate eligibility when it was discovered he played with Plattsburgh and Rutland in the 1906 Northern Independent League. He then signed with the Athletics and made his debut.

== Professional career ==
=== Philadelphia Athletics (1906–1914) ===
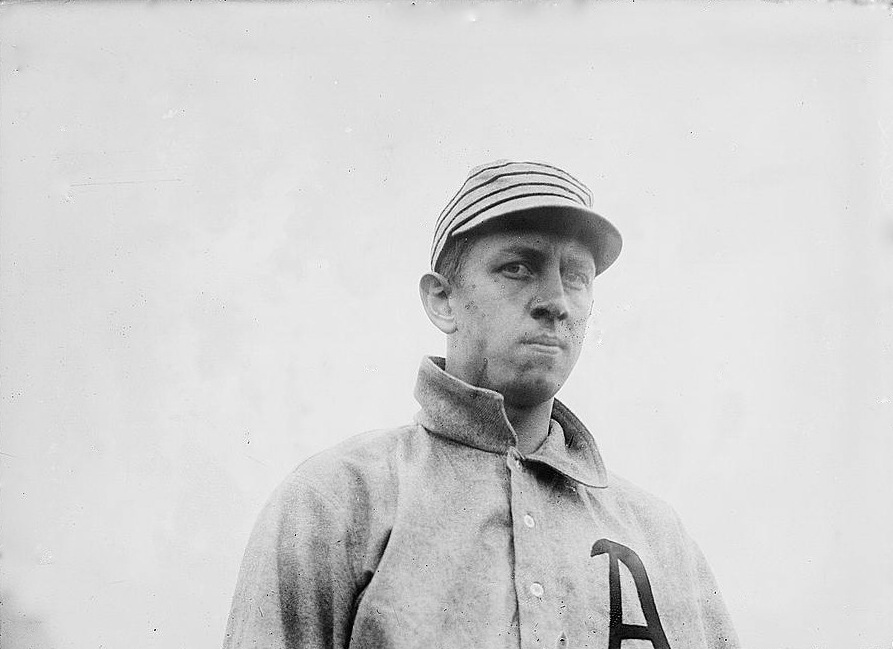
Collins in 1911

After spending all but 14 games of the 1907 season in the minor leagues, Collins played in 102 games in 1908 and by 1909 was a full-time player. That season, he registered a .347 batting average and 67 steals. Collins was also named the A's starting second baseman in 1909, a position he played for the rest of his career, after seeing time at second, third, shortstop, and the outfield the previous two seasons. In 1910, Collins stole a career-high 81 bases, the first American League player to steal at least 80 bases in a season, and played on the first of his six World Series championship teams.

Collins ranks 11th in the major leagues for most hits of all time with 3,315, and seventh for most stolen bases of all time with 745. He is one of five players to steal six bases in a game, and the only person to do so twice, with both occurrences happening within eleven days, on September 11 and September 22, 1912, respectively. Collins was part of the Athletics' "$100,000 infield" (and the highest-paid of the quartet) which propelled the team to four American League (AL) pennants and three World Series titles between 1910 and 1914. He earned the league's Chalmers Award (early Most Valuable Player recognition) in 1914.

In 1913, the Federal League formed as a direct competitor to the American League. In an effort to retain Collins, Athletics manager Connie Mack offered him a five-year guaranteed contract the longest guaranteed contract that had ever been offered to a player. Collins declined, and after the 1914 season Mack sold Collins to the White Sox for $50,000, the highest price ever paid for a player up to that point and the first of only three times that a reigning MVP was sold or traded (the others being Alex Rodriguez in 2003 and Giancarlo Stanton in 2017, both to the New York Yankees). The Sox paid Collins $15,000 for 1915, making him the third highest paid player in the league, behind Ty Cobb and Tris Speaker.

=== Chicago White Sox (1915–1926) ===
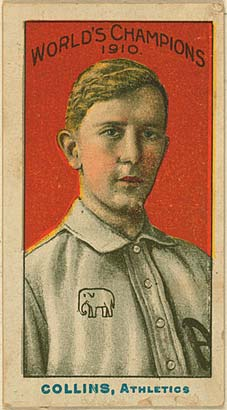
Baseball Card

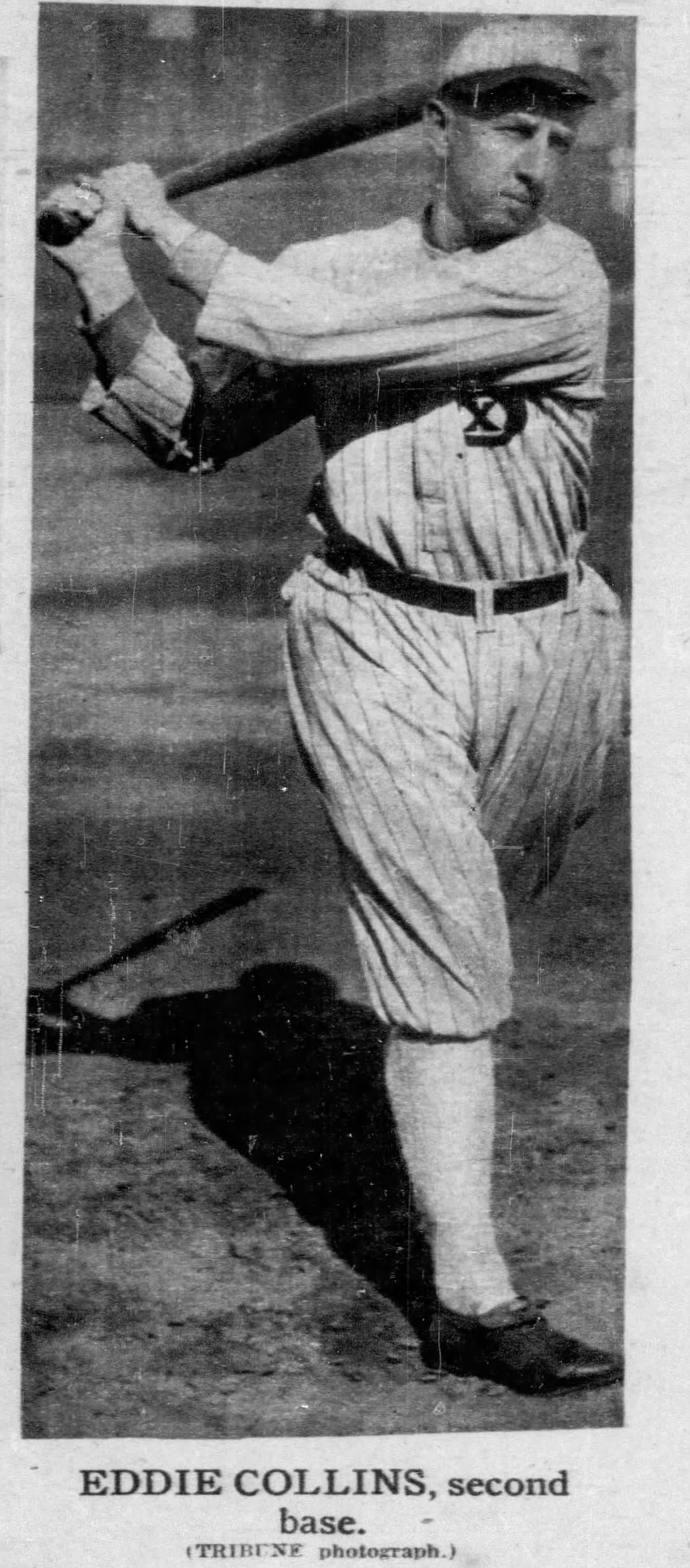
1923 photograph in the Chicago Tribune

In Chicago, Collins continued to post top-ten batting and stolen base numbers, and he helped the Sox capture pennants in 1917 and 1919. He was part of the notorious "Black Sox" team that threw the 1919 World Series to the Cincinnati Reds. Collins was not accused of being part of the conspiracy and was considered to have played honestly, his low .226 batting average notwithstanding. Years later, Collins would say he had no pity for the eight players who were banished because he said they knew what they were doing.

In 1920 on September 4, during the second game of a doubleheader, the official scorer conflated the offensive statistics for Collins and his teammate Buck Weaver. As Collins had gone 2-for-4 and Weaver had gone 0-for-3, this led to Collins' career hit total being inaccurately recorded as 3,313 for decades. Despite the correction in official records, the Hall of Fame has not updated the hit total on his plaque.

In August 1924, Collins was named player-manager of the White Sox and held the position through the 1926 season, posting a record of 174–160 (.521). His two full seasons were the only winning seasons enjoyed by the White Sox from 1921 to 1936.

Collins, circa 1926

On June 3, 1925, Collins collected the 3,000th hit of his career to become the sixth player in major league history to join the 3,000 hit club, doing so for the White Sox off pitcher Rip Collins of the Detroit Tigers at Navin Field on a single. Incidentally, this was also the first game in which there were two current members of the 3,000 hit club playing in the same game, as Ty Cobb played center field.

=== Return to the Athletics (1927–1930) ===
Collins returned to Philadelphia to rejoin the Athletics in 1927 as a player-coach. For all intents and purposes, 1927 was his last year as a full-time player; he only played in 48 games in the following three years, mostly as a pinch hitter. The A's won the World Series in 1929 and 1930, but Collins didn't play in either. His last appearance as a player was on August 2, 1930.

Collins finished his career with 1,300 runs batted in. To date, Collins is the only major league player to play for two teams for at least 12 seasons each. Upon his retirement, he ranked second in major league history in career games (2,826), walks (1,499) and stolen bases (744), third in runs scored (1,821), fourth in hits (3,315) and at bats (9,949), sixth in on-base percentage (.424), and eighth in total bases (4,268); he was also fourth in AL history in triples (187).

He still holds the major league record of 512 career sacrifice bunts, over 100 more than any other player. He was the first major leaguer in modern history to steal 80 bases in a season, and still shares the major league record of six steals in a game, which he accomplished twice in September 1912. He regularly batted over .320, retiring with a career average of .333. He also holds major league records for career games (2,650), assists (7,630) and total chances (14,591) at second base, and ranks second in putouts (6,526). Collins is one of only 31 players in baseball history to have appeared in major league games in four decades.

== Front-office career ==
Following the A's 1930 World Series victory, Collins retired as a player and immediately stepped into a full-time position as a coach with the A's.

After two seasons as a coach, Collins was hired as vice president and general manager of the Boston Red Sox. The new owner, Tom Yawkey, was a close friend who had attended the same prep school as Collins. Yawkey actually bought the Red Sox at Collins' suggestion. Collins assumed management of a team that had bottomed out from a long decline dating from their sale of Babe Ruth; the 1932 Red Sox finished 43–111, the worst record in franchise history and second last-place finish in three seasons.

In 1933, under Collins’ leadership, the Red Sox became the first team to field a Mexican-born player in the major leagues, Mel Almada.

Collins remained general manager through the 1947 season, retiring at age 60 after a period of declining health, thus ending 41 years in baseball. During his 15 years as general manager, Collins signed future Hall of Famers such as Joe Cronin, Ted Williams and Bobby Doerr.

Collins managed winning seasons in seven of his final twelve years as general manager. Under Collins' leadership, the Red Sox won the 1946 pennant, their first in 28 years. After his death in 1951, the Red Sox hung a plaque outside Fenway Park in honor of Collins. In May 2018, the Red Sox removed the plaque, reportedly due to the team not integrating Black players before the end of his tenure in 1947. Of the 16 major league teams at the time, the Dodgers, Browns, and Indians were the only three that were integrated by the 1947 season.

Collins was inducted into the Baseball Hall of Fame in 1939.

Collins struggled with major heart problems for several years at the end of his life. He was admitted to a hospital in Boston on March 10, 1951, and died there due to a heart condition on March 25 at age 63.

=== Managerial record ===
Team	Year	Regular season					Postseason			
Team	Year	Games	Won	Lost	Win %	Finish	Won	Lost	Win %	Result
CWS	1924	27	14	13	.519	interim	–	–	–	–
CWS	1925	154	79	75	.513	5th in AL	–	–	–	–
CWS	1926	153	81	72	.529	5th in AL	–	–	–	–
Total		344	174	160	.521		0	0	–	

== Legacy ==
In 1999, Collins was ranked number 24 on The Sporting News' list of the 100 Greatest Baseball Players, and was a nominee for the Major League Baseball All-Century Team. He played on a total of six World Series-winning teams (1910, 1911, 1913, 1917, 1929, and 1930), though he did not participate in any of the final two series' games.

Under the win shares statistical rating system created by baseball historian and analyst Bill James, Collins was the greatest second baseman of all time.

Collins' son, Eddie Jr., was an outfielder who played for Yale. He briefly saw major league action (in 1939 and 1941–42, all with the A's) and later worked in the Philadelphia Phillies' front office.

== See also ==
- List of Major League Baseball career hits leaders
- List of Major League Baseball career doubles leaders
- List of Major League Baseball career triples leaders
- List of Major League Baseball career runs scored leaders
- List of Major League Baseball career runs batted in leaders
- List of Major League Baseball stolen base records
- List of Major League Baseball career stolen bases leaders
- List of Major League Baseball annual runs scored leaders
- List of Major League Baseball annual stolen base leaders
- List of Major League Baseball players who played in four decades
- List of Major League Baseball player-managers
- Major League Baseball titles leaders
