= Athletics award winners and league leaders =

This is a list of award winners and league leaders for the Athletics of Major League Baseball.

The team was known as the Philadelphia Athletics from 1901 to 1954, the Kansas City Athletics from 1955 to 1967, and the Oakland Athletics from 1968 to 2024.

== American League Most Valuable Player ==
See: Kenesaw Mountain Landis Most Valuable Player Award

- Eddie Collins (1914)
- Mickey Cochrane (1928)
- Lefty Grove (1931)
- Jimmie Foxx (1932, 1933)
- Bobby Shantz (1952)
- Vida Blue (1971)
- Reggie Jackson (1973)
- José Canseco (1988)
- Rickey Henderson (1990)
- Dennis Eckersley (1992)
- Jason Giambi (2000)
- Miguel Tejada (2002)

== American League Cy Young Award ==
See: Cy Young Award

- Vida Blue (1971)
- Catfish Hunter (1974)
- Bob Welch (1990)
- Dennis Eckersley (1992)
- Barry Zito (2002)

== American League Rookie of the Year ==
See: Jackie Robinson Rookie of the Year Award

- Harry Byrd (1952)
- José Canseco (1986)
- Mark McGwire (1987)
- Walt Weiss (1988)
- Ben Grieve (1998)
- Bobby Crosby (2004)
- Huston Street (2005)
- Andrew Bailey (2009)
- Nick Kurtz (2025)

== American League Manager of the Year ==
See: Manager of the Year Award

- Tony La Russa (1988, 1992)
- Bob Melvin (2012, 2018)

== American League Gold Glove Award ==
Pitcher

- Mike Norris (1980, 1981)

Catcher

- Sean Murphy (2021)

First base

- Vic Power (1958)
- Mark McGwire (1990)
- Matt Olson (2018, 2019)

Third base

- Eric Chavez (2001, 2002, 2003, 2004, 2005, 2006)
- Matt Chapman (2018, 2019, 2021)

Shortstop

- Alfredo Griffin (1985)

Outfield

- Joe Rudi (1974, 1975, 1976)
- Dwayne Murphy (1980, 1981, 1982, 1983, 1984, 1985)
- Rickey Henderson (1981)
- Josh Reddick (2012)

== American League Platinum Glove Award ==
- Matt Chapman (Third Base) (2018, 2019)

=== Wilson Defensive Player of the Year Award ===
See explanatory note at Atlanta Braves award winners and league leaders.
Team (at all positions)

- (2012)
- (2013)

== American League Silver Slugger ==
Designated hitter

- Brent Rooker (2024)

First baseman

- Mark McGwire (1992, 1996)
- Jason Giambi (2001)
- Nick Kurtz (2025)

Third baseman

- Eric Chavez (2002)

Outfield

- Rickey Henderson (1981, 1990)
- Jose Canseco (1988, 1990, 1991)

== All-MLB Team ==
See: All-MLB Team

=== First team ===
Relief pitcher

- Liam Hendriks (2020)

=== Second team ===
Relief pitcher

- Liam Hendriks (2019)
- Mason Miller (2024)

First base

- Nick Kurtz (2025)

Shortstop

- Marcus Semien (2019)

== Edgar Martínez Award ==
See: Edgar Martínez Award

- Dave Kingman (1984)
- Dave Parker (1989)
- Khris Davis (2018)

== Mariano Rivera AL Reliever of the Year Award ==
See: Major League Baseball Reliever of the Year Award

- Liam Hendriks (2020)

== Rolaids Relief Man Award ==
See: Rolaids Relief Man Award

- Dennis Eckersley (1988, 1992)
- Billy Koch (2002)
- Keith Foulke (2003)

== MLB All-Century Team (1999) ==
See: MLB All-Century Team

- Ty Cobb, outfielder (1927–1928)
- Lefty Grove, pitcher (1925–1933)
- Mark McGwire, first baseman (1986–1997)

== DHL Hometown Heroes (2006) ==
See: DHL Hometown Heroes

- Reggie Jackson (1967–1975, 1987) (winner)
- Dennis Eckersley (1987–1995) (nominee)
- Lefty Grove (1925–1933) (nominee)
- Rickey Henderson (1979–1984, 1989–1993, 1994–1995, 1998) (nominee)
- Catfish Hunter (1965–1974) (nominee)

== MLB All-Time Team (1997; Baseball Writers' Association of America) ==
See: MLB All-Time Team

- Harold Baines, designated hitter (1990–1992) (runner-up)
- Ty Cobb, center fielder (1927–1928) (runner-up)
- Dennis Eckersley, relief pitcher (1987–1995) (runner-up)
- Jimmie Foxx, first baseman (1925–1935) (runner-up)
- Joe Morgan, second baseman (1984) (runner-up)

== Baseball Prospectus "Internet Baseball Awards" Team of the Decade (1999) ==
- Reliever of the Decade: Dennis Eckersley, Athletics–Cardinals–Red Sox
- First Base: Mark McGwire, Athletics–Cardinals
- 2001 Most Valuable Player, AL: Jason Giambi
- 2005 Rookie of the Year, AL: Huston Street

== Chuck Tanner Major League Baseball Manager of the Year Award ==
- Bob Melvin (2012)

== Babe Ruth Award (World Series) ==
See: Babe Ruth Award

- Gene Tenace (1972)
- Bert Campaneris (1973)
- Dick Green (1974)
- Dave Stewart (1989)

== Topps All-Star Rookie Teams ==
See: Topps All-Star Rookie Teams

- 1961: Dick Howser, shortstop
- 1962: Ed Charles, third baseman & Manny Jiménez, outfielder
- 1964: Bert Campaneris, shortstop
- 1966: Jim Nash, right-handed pitcher
- 1967: Rick Monday, outfielder
- 1971: Ángel Mangual, outfielder
- 1974: Claudell Washington, outfielder
- 1977: Wayne Gross, third baseman & Mitchell Page, outfielder
- 1978: Dave Revering, first baseman & John Johnson, left-handed pitcher
- 1983: Bob Kearney, catcher
- 1986: José Canseco, outfielder
- 1987: Mark McGwire, first baseman
- 1988: Walt Weiss, shortstop
- 1996: Tony Batista, second baseman
- 1998: A. J. Hinch, catcher & Ben Grieve, outfielder
- 2000: Terrence Long, outfielder
- 2002: Mark Ellis, second baseman
- 2005: Dan Johnson, first baseman & Huston Street, right-handed pitcher
- 2008: Brad Ziegler, right-handed pitcher
- 2012: Yoenis Céspedes, outfielder

== Baseball America Major League Executive of the Year ==
See: Baseball America Major League Executive of the Year

- 2006 – Billy Beane

== Team award ==
- 1902 – American League pennant
- 1905 – American League pennant
- 1910 – World Series championship
- 1911 – World Series championship
- 1913 – World Series championship
- 1914 – American League pennant
- 1929 – World Series championship
- 1930 – World Series championship
- 1931 – American League pennant
- 1972 – World Series Trophy
- 1973 – World Series Trophy
- 1974 – World Series Trophy
- 1982 – Baseball America Organization of the Year
- 1988 – William Harridge Trophy (American League champion)
- 1989 – Commissioner's Trophy (World Series)
- 1990 – William Harridge Trophy (American League champion)
- 1999 – Baseball America Organization of the Year

== Minor-league system ==
=== MiLB Overall Minor League Hitter of the Year ===
- 2009 – Chris Carter

=== Organizational Player and Pitcher of the Year ===
Organizational Player and Pitcher of the Year
Year	Player of the Year	Pitcher of the Year	Ref.
1995	Steve Cox	Derek Manning	
1996	D. T. Cromer	Willie Adams	
1997	Ben Grieve	Brad Rigby	
1998	Eric Chavez	Jay Witasick	
1999	Adam Piatt	Tim Hudson	
2000	José Ortiz	Barry Zito	
2001	Esteban Germán	Mario Ramos	
2002	Graham Koonce	Rich Harden	
2003	Graham Koonce	Rich Harden	
2004	Dan Johnson	Santiago Casilla	
2005	Andre Ethier	Dallas Braden	
2006	Jeff Baisley	Jason Windsor	
2007	Daric Barton	Trevor Cahill	
2008	Chris Carter	Trevor Cahill	
2009	Chris Carter	Pedro Figueroa	
2010	Grant Green	Ian Krol	
2011	Michael Choice; Jermaine Mitchell	Graham Godfrey	
2012	Miles Head	A. J. Griffin; Dan Straily	
2013	Anthony Aliotti	Sonny Gray	
2014	Matt Olson; Daniel Robertson	Seth Streich	
2015	Chad Pinder	Ryan Dull	
2016	Ryon Healy	Daniel Mengden	
2017	Matt Olson	A. J. Puk	
2018	Ramón Laureano	Jesús Luzardo	
2019	Seth Brown	Daulton Jefferies	

== Other achievements ==
=== National Baseball Hall of Fame ===
See: Oakland Athletics#Hall of Famers

=== California Sports Hall of Fame ===
Athletics in the California Sports Hall of Fame
No.	Player	Position	Tenure	Notes
9, 31, 44	Reggie Jackson	RF	1968–1975; 1987	
10, 11, 22, 29, 42	Tony La Russa	IF; Manager	1963; 1968–1971; 1986–1995	

=== Athletics in the Bay Area Sports Hall of Fame ===
See: Oakland Athletics#Bay Area Sports Hall of Fame

=== Athletics in the Philadelphia Baseball Wall of Fame ===
See: Oakland Athletics#Philadelphia Baseball Wall of Fame

=== Retired numbers ===
See: Oakland Athletics#Retired numbers

=== Catfish Hunter Award ===
See footnote and Catfish Hunter

The award is given to the Athletics' most inspirational player.

Year	Winner	Position	Ref
2004	Tim Hudson	P	
2005	Mark Ellis (1)	2B	
2006	Jason Kendall	C	
2007	Mark Ellis (2)	2B	
2008	Mike Sweeney	1B	
2009	Kurt Suzuki	C	
2010	Ben Sheets	P	
2011	Josh Willingham	OF	
2012	Jonny Gomes	OF	
2013	Coco Crisp	OF	
2014	Stephen Vogt (1)	C/OF/1B	
2015	Stephen Vogt (2)	C/OF/1B	
2016	Stephen Vogt (3)	C/OF/1B	
2017	Jed Lowrie	2B	
2018	Matt Chapman	3B	
2019	Marcus Semien (1)	SS	
2020	Marcus Semien (2)	SS	
2021	Chris Bassitt	P	
2022	Stephen Vogt (4)	C/1B	
2023	Ryan Noda	1B	
2024	Shea Langeliers	C	

=== Sporting News Sportsman of the Year ===
See: Sporting News#Sportsman of the Year

- 1972: Charlie Finley

=== Ford C. Frick Award recipients ===
See: Oakland Athletics#Ford C. Frick Award recipients

=== Sports Illustrated Top 10 GMs/Executives of the Decade (2009) ===
See: List of 2009 all-decade Sports Illustrated awards and honors#Top 10 GMs/Executives of the Decade

- No. 10 – Billy Beane (the list's only other MLB GMs were Boston's Theo Epstein, No. 3, and Seattle and Philadelphia's Pat Gillick, No. 7)

== American League Statistical Batting Leaders ==
=== Batting Average ===
- Nap Lajoie .426 (1901) (Modern Major League Record)
- Al Simmons .381 (1930)
- Al Simmons .390 (1931)
- Jimmie Foxx .356 (1933)
- Ferris Fain .344 (1951)
- Ferris Fain .327 (1952)

=== On-base Percentage ===
- Nap Lajoie .463 (1901)
- Topsy Hartsel .409 (1905)
- Topsy Hartsel .405 (1907)
- Jimmie Foxx .463 (1929)
- Mickey Cochrane .459 (1933)
- Ferris Fain .438 (1952)
- Rickey Henderson .439 (1990)
- Mark McGwire .467 (1996)
- Jason Giambi .476 (2000)
- Jason Giambi .477 (2001)

=== Slugging Percentage ===
- Nap Lajoie .643 (1901)
- Jimmie Foxx .749 (1932)
- Jimmie Foxx .703 (1933)
- Jimmie Foxx .636 (1935)
- Reggie Jackson .608 (1969)
- Reggie Jackson .531 (1973)
- Mark McGwire .618 (1987)
- José Canseco .569 (1988)
- Mark McGwire .585 (1992)
- Mark McGwire .730 (1996)
- Jason Giambi .660 (2001)

=== OPS ===
- Nap Lajoie 1.106 (1901)
- Jimmie Foxx 1.218 (1932)
- Jimmie Foxx 1.152 (1933)
- Jimmie Foxx 1.097 (1935)
- Reggie Jackson 1.018 (1969)
- Reggie Jackson .914 (1973)
- Rickey Henderson 1.016 (1990)
- Mark McGwire 1.197 (1996)
- Jason Giambi 1.137 (2001)

=== Games ===
- George Burns 130 (1918) Co-Leader
- Jimmie Dykes 155 (1921)
- Chick Galloway 155 (1922) Co-Leader
- Bing Miller 154 (1930) Co-Leader
- Frankie Hayes 155 (1944) Co-Leader
- Dave Philley 157 (1953)
- Norm Siebern 162 (1962) Co-Leader
- Sal Bando 162 (1968) Co-Leader
- Sal Bando 162 (1969) Co-Leader
- Sal Bando 162 (1973) Co-Leader
- Sal Bando 160 (1975) Co-Leader
- Phil Garner 160 (1975) Co-Leader
- Tony Armas 109 (1981) Co-Leader
- Terrence Long 162 (2001) Co-Leader
- Miguel Tejada 162 (2001) Co-Leader
- Terrence Long 162 (2002) Co-Leader
- Miguel Tejada 162 (2002) Co-Leader

=== At Bats ===
- Al Simmons 654 (1925)
- Al Simmons 670 (1932)
- Doc Cramer 661 (1933)
- Doc Cramer 649 (1934)
- Doc Cramer 644 (1935)
- Lou Finney 653 (1936)
- Bert Campaneris 642 (1968)
- Bert Campaneris 625 (1972)

=== Runs ===
- Nap Lajoie 145 (1901)
- Dave Fultz 109 (1902) Co-Leader
- Topsy Hartsel 109 (1902) Co-Leader
- Harry Davis 93 (1905)
- Eddie Collins 137 (1912)
- Eddie Collins 125 (1913)
- Eddie Collins 122 (1914)
- Al Simmons 152 (1930)
- Jimmie Foxx 151 (1932)
- Reggie Jackson 123 (1969)
- Reggie Jackson 99 (1973)
- Rickey Henderson 89 (1981)
- Rickey Henderson 119 (1990)

=== Hits ===
- Nap Lajoie 232 (1901)
- George Burns 178 (1918)
- Al Simmons 253 (1925)
- Al Simmons 216 (1932)
- Bert Campaneris 177 (1968)
- Joe Rudi 181 (1972)
- Rickey Henderson 135 (1981)

=== Total Bases ===
- Nap Lajoie 350 (1901)
- George Burns 236 (1918)
- Al Simmons 392 (1925)
- Al Simmons 373 (1929)
- Jimmie Foxx 438 (1932)
- Jimmie Foxx 403 (1933)
- Sal Bando 295 (1973) Co-Leader
- Joe Rudi 287 (1974)

=== Doubles ===
- Nap Lajoie 48 (1901)
- Harry Davis 43 (1902) Co-Leader
- Socks Seybold 45 (1903)
- Harry Davis 47 (1905)
- Harry Davis 35 (1907)
- Eric McNair 47 (1932)
- Ferris Fain 43 (1952)
- Sal Bando 32 (1973) Co-Leader
- Joe Rudi 39 (1974)
- Jason Giambi 47 (2001)

=== Triples ===
- Frank Baker 19 (1909)
- Harry Simpson 11 (1956) Co-Leader
- Gino Cimoli 15 (1962)
- Bert Campaneris 12 (1965) Co-Leader
- Joe Rudi 9 (1972) Co-Leader

=== Home Runs ===
- Nap Lajoie 14 (1901)
- Socks Seybold 16 (1902)
- Harry Davis 10 (1904)
- Harry Davis 8 (1905)
- Harry Davis 12 (1906)
- Harry Davis 8 (1907)
- Home Run Baker 11 (1911)
- Home Run Baker 10 (1912) Co-Leader
- Home Run Baker 12 (1913)
- Home Run Baker 9 (1914)
- Tilly Walker 11 (1918) Co-Leader
- Jimmie Foxx 58 (1932)
- Jimmie Foxx 48 (1933)
- Jimmie Foxx 36 (1935) Co-Leader
- Gus Zernial 33 (1951)
- Reggie Jackson 32 (1973)
- Reggie Jackson 36 (1975) Co-Leader
- Tony Armas 22 (1981) Co-Leader
- Mark McGwire 49 (1987)
- José Canseco 42 (1988)
- José Canseco 44 (1991) Co-Leader
- Mark McGwire 52 (1996)
- Khris Davis 48 (2018)

=== RBI ===
- Nap Lajoie 125 (1901)
- Harry Davis 83 (1905)
- Harry Davis 96 (1906)
- Frank Baker 130 (1912)
- Frank Baker 117 (1912)
- Al Simmons 157 (1929)
- Jimmie Foxx 169 (1932)
- Jimmie Foxx 163 (1933)
- Reggie Jackson 117 (1973)
- José Canseco 124 (1988)

=== Walks ===
- Topsy Hartsel 87 (1902)
- Topsy Hartsel 121 (1905)
- Topsy Hartsel 88 (1906)
- Topsy Hartsel 106 (1907)
- Topsy Hartsel 93 (1908)
- Max Bishop 128 (1929)
- Jimmie Foxx 111 (1934)
- Gene Tenace 110 (1974)
- Rickey Henderson 116 (1982)
- Rickey Henderson 103 (1983)
- Mark McGwire 110 (1990)
- Rickey Henderson 118 (1998)
- Jason Giambi 137 (2000)
- Jason Giambi 129 (2001)
- Eric Chavez 95 (2004)
- Daric Barton 110 (2010)

=== Strikeouts ===
- Jimmie Dykes 98 (1922)
- Jimmie Foxx 70 (1929)
- Jimmie Foxx 66 (1930) Co-Leader
- Jimmie Foxx 84 (1931)
- Jimmie Foxx 93 (1933)
- Jimmie Foxx 99 (1935)
- Sam Chapman 96 (1940)
- Eddie Joost 110 (1947)
- Nelson Mathews 143 (1964)
- Reggie Jackson 171 (1968)
- Reggie Jackson 142 (1969)
- Reggie Jackson 135 (1970)
- Reggie Jackson 161 (1971)
- Tony Armas 115 (1981)

=== Stolen Bases ===
- Topsy Hartsel 47 (1902)
- Danny Hoffman 46 (1905)
- Eddie Collins 81 (1910)
- Billy Werber 35 (1937) Co-Leader
- Bert Campaneris 51 (1965)
- Bert Campaneris 52 (1966)
- Bert Campaneris 55 (1967)
- Bert Campaneris 62 (1968)
- Bert Campaneris 42 (1970)
- Bert Campaneris 52 (1972)
- Billy North 54 (1974)
- Billy North 75 (1976)
- Rickey Henderson 100 (1980)
- Rickey Henderson 56 (1981)
- Rickey Henderson 130 (1982)
- Rickey Henderson 108 (1983)
- Rickey Henderson 66 (1984)
- Rickey Henderson 65 (1990)
- Rickey Henderson 58 (1991)
- Rickey Henderson 66 (1998)
- Coco Crisp 49 (2011) Co-Leader

=== Singles ===
- Nap Lajoie 156 (1901)
- Eddie Collins 145 (1913)
- Stuffy McInnis 160 (1914)
- George Burns 141 (1918)
- Doc Cramer 158 (1934)
- Doc Cramer 170 (1935)
- Irv Hall 139 (1945)
- Bert Campaneris 139 (1968)

=== Runs Created ===
- Nap Lajoie 158 (1901)
- Al Simmons 164 (1925)
- Jimmie Foxx 149 (1929) Co-Leader
- Jimmie Foxx 206 (1932)
- Jimmie Foxx 181 (1933)
- Norm Siebern 123 (1962)
- Jason Giambi 162 (2001)

=== Extra-Base Hits ===
- Nap Lajoie 76 (1901)
- Harry Davis 61 (1905)
- Harry Davis 61 (1906)
- Al Simmons 79 (1925) Co-Leader
- Al Simmons 84 (1929)
- Jimmie Foxx 100 (1932)
- Jimmie Foxx 94 (1933)
- Reggie Jackson 86 (1969)
- Sal Bando 64 (1973)
- Joe Rudi 65 (1974)
- Reggie Jackson 78 (1975)
- Tony Armas 49 (1981)
- José Canseco 76 (1988)
- Jason Giambi 87 (2001) Co-Leader

=== Times on Base ===
- Nap Lajoie 269 (1901)
- Topsy Hartsel 270 (1905)
- Eddie Collins 284 (1914)
- Jimmie Foxx 329 (1932)
- Jimmie Foxx 301 (1933)
- Ferris Fain 282 (1952)
- Norm Siebern 296 (1962)
- Wayne Causey 265 (1964)
- Rickey Henderson 301 (1980)
- Jason Giambi 320 (2001)

=== Hit By Pitch ===
- Eddie Murphy 12 (1914) Co-Leader
- Wally Schang 9 (1917) Co-Leader
- George Burns 8 (1918) Co-Leader
- George Burns 12 (1919)
- Bing Miller 8 (1928)
- Jimmie Dykes 7 (1929)
- Jimmie Dykes 10 (1930)
- Bing Miller 10 (1931)
- Bobby Del Greco 13 (1962) Co-Leader
- Bert Campaneris 9 (1965) Co-Leader
- Don Baylor 20 (1976)

=== Sacrifice Hits ===
- Dave Fultz 35 (1902)
- Mule Haas 33 (1930)
- Mule Haas 19 (1931)
- Mule Haas 27 (1932)
- Eddie Joost 24 (1947)
- Barney McCosky 22 (1948)
- Bert Campaneris 20 (1972)
- Dwayne Murphy 22 (1980)
- Mike Gallego 17 (1990) Co-Leader
- Jerry Browne 16 (1992)

=== Sacrifice Flies ===
- Héctor López 9 (1958) Co-Leader
- Leo Posada 12 (1961) Co-Leader
- Mike Hershberger 7 (1966) Co-Leader
- Sal Bando 13 (1974)
- Dave Kingman 14 (1984)

=== Intentional Walks ===
- Reggie Jackson 20 (1969) Co-Leader
- Reggie Jackson 20 (1974)

=== Grounded into Double Plays ===
- Frankie Hayes 23 (1941) Co-Leader
- Pete Suder 23 (1941) Co-Leader
- George Kell 28 (1944)
- Sam Chapman 22 (1946)
- Billy Hitchcock 30 (1950)
- Dave Philley 29 (1952)
- Héctor López 23 (1958)
- Ben Grieve 32 (2000)
- Jason Kendall 27 (2005)

=== At Bats per Strikeout ===
- Ed Busch 46.2 (1945)
- Carney Lansford 22.0 (1989)
- Jason Kendall 15.4 (2005)

=== At Bats per Home Run ===
- Socks Seybold 32.6 (1902)
- Harry Davis 40.4 (1904)
- Harry Davis 75.9 (1905)
- Harry Davis 45.9 (1906)
- Harry Davis 72.8 (1907)
- Frank Baker 53.8 (1911)
- Frank Baker 57.7 (1912)
- Frank Baker 47.0 (1913)
- Jimmie Foxx 10.1 (1932)
- Jimmie Foxx 11.9 (1933)
- Jimmie Foxx 14.9 (1935)
- Gus Zernial 13.2 (1953)
- Gus Zernial 13.8 (1955)
- Reggie Jackson 16.8 (1973)
- Mark McGwire 11.4 (1987)
- José Canseco 14.5 (1988)
- Mark McGwire 14.8 (1989)
- José Canseco 13.0 (1991)
- Mark McGwire 11.1 (1992)
- Mark McGwire 8.1 (1995)
- Mark McGwire 8.1 (1996)

=== Outs ===
- Doc Cramer 491 (1933)
- Irv Hall 484 (1945)
- Ed Charles 484 (1963)
- Bert Campaneris 520 (1972)
- Rubén Sierra 515 (1993)

== American League Statistical Pitching Leaders ==
=== ERA ===
- Rube Waddell 1.48 (1905)
- Harry Krause 1.39 (1909)
- Lefty Grove 2.51 (1926)
- Lefty Grove 2.81 (1929)
- Lefty Grove 2.54 (1930)
- Lefty Grove 2.06 (1931)
- Lefty Grove 2.84 (1932)
- Diego Segui 2.56 (1970)
- Vida Blue 1.82 (1971)
- Catfish Hunter 2.49 (1974)
- Steve Ontiveros 2.65 (1994)

=== Wins ===
- Rube Waddell 27 (1905)
- Jack Coombs 31 (1910)
- Jack Coombs 28 (1911)
- Eddie Rommel 27 (1922)
- Eddie Rommel 21 (1925) Co-Leader
- Lefty Grove 24 (1928) Co-Leader
- George Earnshaw 24 (1929)
- Lefty Grove 28 (1930)
- Lefty Grove 31 (1931)
- Lefty Grove 24 (1933) Co-Leader
- Bobby Shantz 24 (1952)
- Catfish Hunter 25 (1974) Co-Leader
- Steve McCatty 14 (1981) Co-Leader
- Dave Stewart 20 (1987) Co-Leader
- Bob Welch 27 (1990)
- Tim Hudson 20 (2000) Co-Leader
- Mark Mulder 21 (2001)
- Barry Zito 23 (2002)

=== Won-Loss Percentage ===
- Rube Waddell .730 (1905)
- Eddie Plank .760 (1906)
- Chief Bender .821 (1910)
- Chief Bender .773 (1911)
- Chief Bender .850 (1914)
- Eddie Rommel .786 (1927)
- Eddie Rommel .857 (1929)
- Lefty Grove .848 (1930)
- Lefty Grove .886 (1931)
- Lefty Grove .750 (1933)
- Bobby Shantz .774 (1952)
- Dave Wickersham .733 (1962)
- Bob Welch .818 (1990)
- Tim Hudson .769 (2000)

=== WHIP ===
- Lefty Grove 1.144 (1930)
- Lefty Grove 1.077 (1931)
- Lefty Grove 1.193 (1932)
- Bobby Shantz 1.048 (1952)
- Vida Blue .952 (1971)
- Catfish Hunter .986 (1974)
- Steve Ontiveros 1.032 (1994)

=== Hits Allowed/9IP ===
- Rube Waddell 6.33 (1905)
- Jimmy Dygert 6.88 (1907)
- Lefty Grove 7.92 (1926)
- George Earnshaw 8.23 (1929)
- Vida Blue 6.03 (1971)
- Mike Norris 6.81 (1980)
- Steve McCatty 6.79 (1981)

=== Walks/9IP ===
- Chief Bender 1.74 (1912)
- Bob Hasty 2.01 (1921)
- Jack Quinn 1.65 (1927)
- Eddie Rommel 1.35 (1928)
- Lum Harris 1.34 (1944)
- Bobby Shantz 2.03 (1952)
- Gil Heredia 1.53 (1999)

=== Strikeouts/9IP ===
- Rube Waddell 6.84 (1902)
- Rube Waddell 8.39 (1903)
- Rube Waddell 8.20 (1904)
- Rube Waddell 7.86 (1905)
- Rube Waddell 6.47 (1906)
- Rube Waddell 7.33 (1907)
- Lefty Grove 5.30 (1925)
- Lefty Grove 6.77 (1926)
- Lefty Grove 5.97 (1927)
- George Earnshaw 6.65 (1928)
- Lefty Grove 5.56 (1929)
- Lefty Grove 6.46 (1930)
- Lou Brissie 5.89 (1948)
- Vida Blue 8.68 (1971)

=== Games ===
- Eddie Plank 43 (1903)
- Rube Waddell 46 (1905)
- Jack Coombs 45 (1910)
- Eddie Rommel 51 (1922)
- Eddie Rommel 56 (1923)
- Lefty Grove 50 (1930)
- Joe Berry 52 (1945)
- John Wyatt 81 (1964)
- Rollie Fingers 76 (1974)
- Rollie Fingers 75 (1975)
- Bob Lacey 74 (1978)
- Buddy Groom 76 (1999) Co-Leader
- Billy Koch 84 (2002)

=== Saves ===
- Chief Bender 3 (1906)Co-Leader
- Eddie Plank 4 (1911) Co-Leader
- Chief Bender 13 (1913)
- Lefty Grove 9 (1930)
- Joe Berry 12 (1944) Co-Leader
- Jack Aker 32 (1966)
- Dennis Eckersley 45 (1988)
- Dennis Eckersley 51 (1992)
- Keith Foulke 43 (2003)

=== Innings ===
- Scott Perry 332 1/3 (1918)
- Rube Walberg 291 (1931)
- Rick Langford 290 (1980)
- Dave Stewart 275 2/3 (1988)
- Dave Stewart 267 (1990)

=== Strikeouts ===
- Rube Waddell 210 (1902)
- Rube Waddell 302 (1903)
- Rube Waddell 349 (1904)
- Rube Waddell 287 (1905)
- Rube Waddell 196 (1906)
- Rube Waddell 232 (1907)
- Lefty Grove 116 (1925)
- Lefty Grove 194 (1926)
- Lefty Grove 174 (1927)
- Lefty Grove 183 (1928)
- Lefty Grove 170 (1929)
- Lefty Grove 209 (1930)
- Lefty Grove 175 (1931)

=== Games Started ===
- Eddie Plank 40 (1903)
- Eddie Plank 41 (1905) Co-Leader
- Jack Coombs 40 (1911)
- Scott Perry 36 (1918)
- Slim Harriss 33 (1925) Co-Leader
- Lefty Grove 37 (1929) Co-Leader
- George Earnshaw 39 (1930)
- George Caster 40 (1938) Co-Leader
- Harry Byrd 37 (1953)
- Chuck Dobson 40 (1970) Co-Leader
- Catfish Hunter 40 (1970) Co-Leader
- Chris Codiroli 37 (1985) Co-Leader
- Dave Stewart 37 (1988)
- Dave Stewart 36 (1989) Co-Leader
- Dave Stewart 36 (1990) Co-Leader
- Dave Stewart 35 (1991) Co-Leader
- Bob Welch 35 (1991) Co-Leader
- Mike Moore 36 (1992) Co-Leader
- Ron Darling 25 (1994) Co-Leader
- Tim Hudson 35 (2001) Co-Leader
- Barry Zito 35 (2001) Co-Leader
- Barry Zito 35 (2002)
- Barry Zito 35 (2005) Co-Leader
- Danny Haren 34 (2006) Co-Leader
- Barry Zito 34 (2006) Co-Leader

=== Complete Games ===
- Rube Waddell 34 (1903) Co-Leader
- Eddie Plank 35 (1905) Co-Leader
- Scott Perry 30 (1918) Co-Leader
- Lefty Grove 27 (1931) Co-Leader
- Lefty Grove 27 (1932)
- Lefty Grove 21 (1933)
- Rick Langford 28 (1980)
- Rick Langford 18 (1981)
- Dave Stewart 14 (1988) Co-Leader
- Dave Stewart 11 (1990) Co=Leader
- Mark Mulder 9 (2003) Co-Leader
- Mark Mulder 5 (2004) Co-Leader

=== Shutouts ===
- Eddie Plank 8 (1907)
- Jack Coombs 13 (1910)
- Eddie Plank 6 (1911 Co-Leader
- George Earnshaw 3 (1930) Co-Leader
- Lefty Grove 4 (1931)
- Lefty Grove 4 (1932)
- Chuck Dobson 5 (1970) Co-Leader
- Vida Blue 8 (1971)
- Steve McCatty 4 (1981) Co-Leader
- Dave Stewart 4 (1990) Co-Leader
- Mark Mulder 4 (2001)
- Tim Hudson 2 (2003) Co-Leader
- Mark Mulder 2 (2003) Co-Leader
- Tim Hudson 2 (2004) Co-Leader

=== Home Runs Allowed ===
- Eddie Rommel 21 (1921) Co-Leader
- Rube Walberg 18 (1927) Co-Leader
- Rube Walberg 22 (1929) Co-Leader
- George Earnshaw 28 (1932)
- Gordon Rhodes 26 (1936)
- Lynn Nelson 27 (1939) Co-Leader
- Orlando Peña 40 (1964)
- Catfish Hunter 39 (1973)
- Matt Keough 38 (1982)

=== Walks Allowed ===
- Chick Fraser 132 (1901)
- Jimmy Dygert 97 (1908)
- Cy Morgan 117 (1910)
- Weldon Wyckoff 165 (1915)
- Elmer Myers 168 (1916)
- Lefty Grove 131 (1925)
- George Earnshaw 125 (1929)
- George Earnshaw 139 (1930)
- Phil Marchildon 140 (1942)
- Phil Marchildon 141 (1947)
- Todd Van Poppel 89 (1994) Co-Leader
- Kevin Appier 102 (2000)

=== Hits Allowed ===
- Jack Coombs 360 (1911)
- Scott Perry 295 (1918)
- Vida Blue 284 (1977) Co-Leader
- Dave Stewart 260 (1989)

=== Strikeout to Walk ===
- Rube Waddell 3.28 (1902)
- Chief Bender 6.58 (1909)
- Lefty Grove 1.92 (1926)
- Lefty Grove 2.86 (1928)
- Lefty Grove 2.10 (1929)
- Lefty Grove 3.48 (1930)
- Lefty Grove 2.82 (1931)
- Lefty Grove 2.38 (1932)
- Bobby Shantz 2.41 (1952)

=== Losses ===
- Weldon Wyckoff 22 (1915)
- Bullet Joe Bush 24 (1916)
- Scott Perry 19 (1918)
- Scott Perry 25 (1920)
- Eddie Rommel 23 (1921)
- Slim Harriss 20 (1922)
- Eddie Rommel 19 (1923) Co-Leader
- Gordon Rhodes 20 (1936)
- Harry Kelley 21 (1937)
- George Caster 20 (1938)
- George Caster 19 (1940) Co-Leader
- Lum Harris 21 (1943)
- Bobo Newsom 20 (1945)
- Dick Fowler 16 (1946) Co-Leader
- Lou Knerr 16 (1946) Co-Leader
- Phil Marchildon 16 (1946) Co-Leader
- Alex Kellner 20 (1950)
- Alex Kellner 14 (1951) Co-Leader
- Harry Byrd 20 (1953)
- Art Ditmar 22 (1956)
- Ed Rakow 17 (1962) Co-Leader
- Orlando Peña 20 (1963)
- Diego Segui 17 (1964)
- John O'Donoghue 18 (1965) Co-Leader
- Vida Blue 19 (1977) Co-Leader
- Rick Langford 19 (1977) Co-Leader
- Brian Kingman 20 (1980)
- Matt Keough 18 (1982) Co-Leader
- Tom Candiotti 16 (1998) Co-Leader

=== Earned Runs Allowed ===
- Jack Coombs 132 (1911)
- Weldon Wyckoff 108 (1915)
- Elmer Myers 128 (1916)
- Elmer Myers 99 (1917)
- Willie Adams 83 (1918)
- George Earnshaw 146 (1930)
- Nels Potter 144 (1939)
- Lum Harris 101 (1943)
- Bobo Newsom 94 (1945)
- Lou Brissie 109 (1949) Co-Leader
- Alex Kellner 137 (1950)
- Alex Kellner 112 (1952)
- Harry Byrd 145 (1953)
- Arnie Portocarrero 112 (1954)
- Art Ditmar 125 (1956)
- Bud Daley 117 (1960)
- Ed Rakow 111 (1962)
- Catfish Hunter 87 (1968)
- Vida Blue 119 (1977) Co-Leader
- Matt Keough 133 (1982) Co-Leader
- Dave Stewart 130 (1991)

=== Wild Pitches ===
- Eddie Plank 13 (1901) Co-Leader
- Rube Waddell 9 (1903)
- Weldon Wyckoff 14 (1914) Co-Leader
- Weldon Wyckoff 14 (1915)
- Bullet Joe Bush 15 (1916)
- Roy Moore 9 (1921)
- Roy Meeker 7 (1924) Co-Leader
- Lefty Grove 9 (1925)
- George Earnshaw 7 (1928) Co-Leader
- George Earnshaw 9 (1932)
- Stu Flythe 16 (1936)
- George Turbeville 9 (1937)
- Porter Vaughan 12 (1940) Co-Leader
- Phil Marchildon 12 (1941)
- Phil Marchildon 13 (1942)
- Lum Harris 8 (1943)
- Carl Scheib 9 (1950)
- Alex Kellner 9 (1951)
- Alex Kellner 10 (1953)
- Arnie Portocarrero 9 (1954)
- Blue Moon Odom 17 (1968) Co-Leader
- Rick Langford 16 (1979)
- Mike Norris 14 (1981)
- Storm Davis 16 (1988) Co-Leader
- Mike Moore 22 (1992)

=== Hit Batsmen ===
- Chick Fraser 32 (1901)
- Eddie Plank 18 (1902)
- Chief Bender 25 (1903)
- Eddie Plank 24 (1905)
- Cy Morgan 18 (1910) Co-Leader
- Cy Morgan 21 (1911)
- Willie Adams 12 (1918)
- Howard Ehmke 14 (1927)
- Whitey Wilshere 10 (1935)
- Russ Christopher 9 (1944)
- Phil Marchildon 7 (1947) Co-Leader
- Harry Byrd 14 (1953)

=== Batters Faced ===
- Eddie Plank 1,378 (1903)
- Scott Perry 1,342 (1918)
- Eddie Rommel 1,154 (1925)
- George Earnshaw 1,299 (1930)
- Rube Walberg 1,248 (1931)
- Dave Stewart 1,156 (1988)
- Dave Stewart 1,081 (1989)
- Dave Stewart 1,088 (1990)
- Barry Zito 945 (2006)

=== Games Finished ===
- Rube Vickers 17 (1908)
- Walt Kinney 21 (1919)
- Eddie Smith 27 (1938)
- Joe Berry 47 (1944)
- Joe Berry 40 (1945)
- Jack Aker 57 (1966)
- Rollie Fingers 59 (1975)
- Dennis Eckersley 65 (1992)
- Billy Koch 79 (2002)
- Keith Foulke 67 (2003)

== Oldest Player ==
- Harry Davis 41 (1915)
- Harry Davis 42 (1916)
- Harry Davis 43 (1917)
- Jack Quinn 43 (1927)
- Jack Quinn 44 (1928)
- Jack Quinn 46 (1930)
- Bob Boyd 41 (1961)
- Satchel Paige 58 (1965)
- Doug Jones 43 (2000)

== Youngest Player ==
- Chief Bender 19 (1903)
- Eddie Collins 19 (1906)
- Stuffy McInnis 18 (1909)
- Herb Pennock 18 (1912)
- Ben Rochefort 17 (1914)
- Lew Malone 18 (1915)
- Charlie Grimm 17 (1916)
- Walter Anderson 19 (1917)
- William Pierson 19 (1918)
- Lena Styles 19 (1919)
- Emmett McCann 18 (1920)
- Jimmie Foxx 17 (1925)
- Jimmie Foxx 18 (1926)
- Lew Krausse, Sr. 19 (1931)
- Frankie Hayes 18 (1933)
- Carl Scheib 16 (1943)
- Carl Scheib 17 (1944)
- Alex George 16 (1955)
- Lou Klimchock 18 (1958)
- Lew Krausse Jr. 18 (1961)
- Dave Duncan 18 (1964)
- Tim Conroy 18 (1978)
- Todd Van Poppel 19 (1991)
- Miguel Tejada 21 (1997)

== See also ==
- Baseball awards
- List of Major League Baseball awards
