= List of Athletics team records =

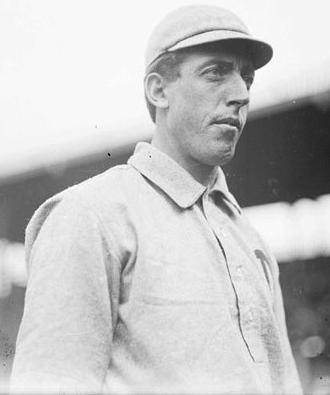
Eddie Plank, the holder of 10 franchise records for the Athletics

The Athletics are a Major League Baseball (MLB) franchise based in West Sacramento, California. The Athletics formed in 1901 as the Philadelphia Athletics; after moving to Kansas City for 13 seasons, the Athletics relocated to Oakland, California in 1968. After the 2024 season, the Athletics temporarily moved to West Sacramento as part of the franchise's relocation to Las Vegas. Through 2023, the Athletics have played 19,113 games, winning 9,260, losing 9,766, and tying 87, for a winning percentage of approximately .487. This list documents the superlative records and accomplishments of team members during their tenures as Athletics.

Eddie Plank holds the most franchise records as of the end of the 2023 season, with ten, including the most career wins, losses and hit batsmen. He is followed by Jimmie Foxx, who holds nine records, including the best career on-base percentage and the single-season home runs record, as well as Al Simmons, who holds the single season hit and RBI records.

Four Athletics hold Major League records. Offensively, Rickey Henderson holds the single-season modern day steals record, recording 130 over 149 games played during the 1982 season. Frankie Hayes is tied for the single-game doubles record, recording four in a game on July 25, 1936. Eddie Collins stole six bases twice in September 1912; his mark would later be tied by Otis Nixon, Eric Young and Carl Crawford. Defensively, Bruno Haas, who spent his only professional season with the Athletics, holds the single game walks allowed record, pitching 16 in his Major League debut.

== Table key ==
Table key
| RBI | Run(s) batted in |
| ERA | Earned run average |
| OPS | On-base percentage plus slugging percentage |
| * | Tie between two or more players/teams |
| † | American League record |
| § | Major League record |

Statistics current through the 2014 season

== Individual career records ==
Batting statistics; pitching statistics

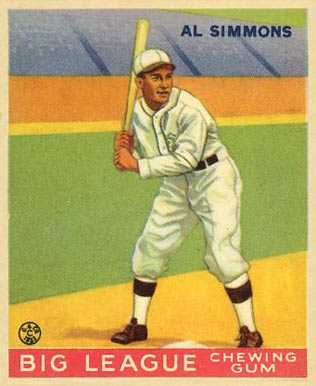
Al Simmons (pictured) holds the best career batting average record for the Athletics.

Career batting records
| Statistic | Player | Record | Athletics career | Ref |
|---|---|---|---|---|
| Batting average | Al Simmons | .356 | 1924–1932, 1940-1941, 1944 | |
| On-base percentage | Jimmie Foxx | .440 | 1925–1935 | |
| Slugging percentage | Jimmie Foxx | .640 | 1925–1935 | |
| OPS | Jimmie Foxx | 1.079 | 1925–1935 | |
| Hits | Bert Campaneris | 1,882 | 1964–1976 | |
| Total bases | Al Simmons | 2,998 | 1924-1932, 1940-1941, 1944 | |
| Singles | Bert Campaneris | 1,472 | 1964-1976 | |
| Doubles | Jimmy Dykes | 365 | 1918–1932 | |
| Triples | Danny Murphy | 102 | 1902–1913 | |
| Home runs | Mark McGwire | 365 | 1986–1997 | |
| RBI | Al Simmons | 1,178 | 1924–1932; 1940–1941; 1944 | |
| Bases on balls | Rickey Henderson | 1,227 | 1979–1984; 1989–1993; 1994–1995; 1998 | |
| Strikeouts | Reggie Jackson | 1,226 | 1967–1975; 1987 | |
| Stolen bases | Rickey Henderson | 867 | 1979–1984; 1989–1993; 1994–1995; 1998 | |

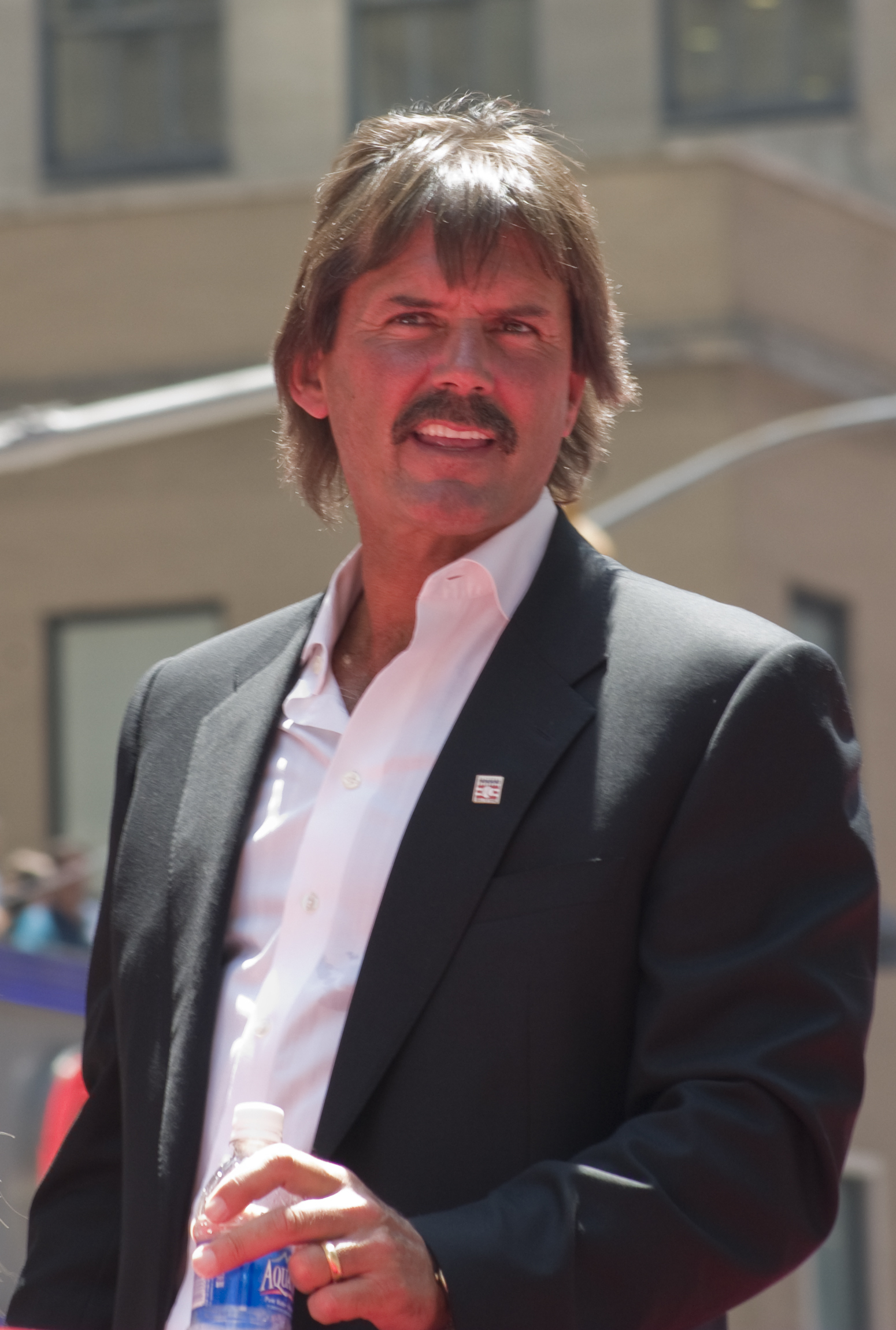
Dennis Eckersley, the holder of two career records for the Athletics

Career pitching records
| Statistic | Player | Record | Athletics career | Ref |
|---|---|---|---|---|
| Wins | Eddie Plank | 284 | 1901–1914 | |
| Losses | Eddie Plank | 162 | 1901–1914 | |
| Win–loss percentage | Lefty Grove | .712 | 1925–1933 | |
| ERA | Rube Waddell | 1.97 | 1902–1907 | |
| Saves | Dennis Eckersley | 320 | 1987–1995 | |
| Strikeouts | Eddie Plank | 1,985 | 1901–1914 | |
| Shutouts | Eddie Plank | 59 | 1901–1914 | |
| Games | Dennis Eckersley | 525 | 1987–1995 | |
| Innings | Eddie Plank | 3,860 2/3 | 1901–1914 | |
| Games started | Eddie Plank | 458 | 1901–1914 | |
| Complete games | Eddie Plank | 362 | 1901–1914 | |
| Walks | Eddie Plank | 913 | 1901–1914 | |
| Hits allowed | Eddie Plank | 3,438 | 1901–1914 | |
| Wild pitches | Blue Moon Odom | 87 | 1964–1975 | |
| Hit batsmen | Eddie Plank | 179 | 1901–1914 | |

== Individual single-season records ==
Batting statistics; pitching statistics

Single-season batting records
| Statistic | Player | Record | Season | Ref |
|---|---|---|---|---|
| Batting average | Nap Lajoie | .426 | 1901 | |
| Home runs | Jimmie Foxx | 58 | 1932 | |
| RBI | Jimmie Foxx | 169 | 1932 | |
| Runs | Al Simmons | 152 | 1930 | |
| Hits | Al Simmons | 253 | 1925 | |
| Singles | Al Simmons | 174 | 1925 | |
| Doubles | Al Simmons | 53 | 1926 | |
| Triples | Home Run Baker | 21 | 1912 | |
| Stolen bases | Rickey Henderson | 130^{§}^{a} | 1982 | |
| At bats | Al Simmons | 670 | 1932 | |
| Slugging percentage | Jimmie Foxx | .749 | 1932 | |
| Extra-base hits | Jimmie Foxx | 100 | 1932 | |
| Total bases | Jimmie Foxx | 438 | 1932 | |
| On-base percentage | Jason Giambi | .477 | 2001 | |
| OPS | Jimmie Foxx | 1.218 | 1932 | |
| Walks | Eddie Joost | 149 | 1949 | |
| Strikeouts | Matt Chapman | 201 | 2021 | |

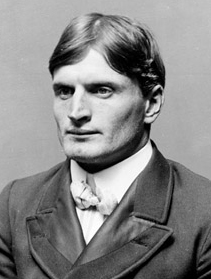
Rube Waddell, the holder of four single-season pitching records for the Athletics franchise

Single-season pitching records
| Statistic | Player | Record | Season | Ref |
|---|---|---|---|---|
| Wins | Jack Coombs | 31* | 1910 | |
| Wins | Lefty Grove | 31* | 1931 | |
| Losses | Scott Perry | 25 | 1920 | |
| Strikeouts | Rube Waddell | 349 | 1904 | |
| ERA | Jack Coombs | 1.30 | 1910 | |
| Earned runs allowed | George Earnshaw | 146 | 1930 | |
| Hits allowed | Jack Coombs | 360 | 1911 | |
| shutouts | Jack Coombs | 13† | 1910 | |
| Saves | Dennis Eckersley | 51 | 1992 | |
| Games | Billy Koch | 84 | 2002 | |
| Starts | Rube Waddell | 46 | 1904 | |
| Complete games | Rube Waddell | 39 | 1904 | |
| Innings | Rube Waddell | 383.0 | 1904 | |

== Team season records ==
Team season batting records
| Statistic | Record | Season |
|---|---|---|
| Home runs | 257 | 2019 |
| Runs | 981 | 1932 |
| Hits | 1,659 | 1925 |
| Batting average | .307 | 1925 |
| Walks | 783 | 1949 |
| Inside-the-park home runs | 13 | 1911 |
| Strikeouts | 1,226 | 2008 |
| Stolen bases | 341 | 1976 |

Team season pitching records
| Statistic | Record | Season |
|---|---|---|
| Most hits allowed | 1,734 | 1999 |
| Most runs allowed | 1,045 | 1936 |
| Most home runs allowed | 220 | 1964 |
| Strikeouts | 1,117 | 2001 |
| Shutouts | 27* | 1907 |
| Shutouts | 27* | 1909 |

Other team records
| Statistic | Record | Season |
|---|---|---|
| Consecutive wins | 20 | 2002 |

* Also an American League record.

== Individual single game records ==
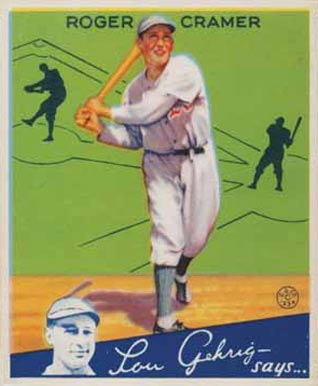
Rodger "Doc" Cramer (pictured) holds the single-game singles record.

Single-game batting records
| Statistic | Player | Record | Date |
|---|---|---|---|
| Singles | Roger Cramer | 6 | June 20, 1932 |
| Doubles | Frankie Hayes | 4^{§}^{b} | July 25, 1936 |
| Triples | Bert Campaneris | 3†^{c} | August 29, 1967 |
| RBI | Reggie Jackson | 10 | June 14, 1969 |
| Total bases | Jimmie Foxx | 16 | July 10, 1932 |
| Stolen bases | Eddie Collins | 6^{§}^{d} | September 11, 1912 |
| Stolen bases | Eddie Collins | 6^{§}^{d} | September 22, 1912 |

Single-game pitching records
| Statistic | Player | Record | Date |
|---|---|---|---|
| Hits allowed | Eddie Rommel | 29 | July 10, 1932 |
| Walks allowed | Bruno Haas | 16^{§}^{e} | June 13, 1915 |
| Home runs allowed | George Caster | 6†^{f} | September 24, 1940 |
| Innings pitched | Jack Coombs | 24†^{g} | September 1, 1906 |
| Strikeouts | Jack Coombs | 18 | September 1, 1906 |

== Team all-time records ==
Team all-time records
| Statistic | Record |
|---|---|
| Home runs | 12,274 |
| Runs | 78,542 |
| Hits | 155,967 |
| Batting average | .259 |
| ERA | 3.97 |
| Runs allowed | 78,542 |

== See also ==
- Baseball statistics
- Oakland Athletics award winners and league leaders

== Notes ==
- ^{[a]} Henderson holds the record under modern rules; Hugh Nicol recorded 138 stolen bases in 1887. However, prior to 1898, a stolen base was credited to a baserunner who reached an extra base on a hit from another player.
- ^{[b]} Tied with 48 others
- ^{[c]} Tied with 20 others
- ^{[d]} Tied with Otis Nixon, Eric Young and Carl Crawford for the modern-day record.
- ^{[e]} Tied with Bill George, George Van Haltren and Tommy Byrne
- ^{[f]} Tied with Tommy Thomas, Tim Wakefield, R. A. Dickey and James Shields
- ^{[g]} Tied with Joe Harris
