= Athletics (baseball) =

Major League Baseball franchise

- 2026 Athletics season

Logo	Cap insignia
- Established in 1901; Based in West Sacramento since 2025

Major league affiliations
- American League (1901–present); West Division (1969–present)

Current uniform
- Retired numbers: 9; 24; 27; 34; 34; 43; 42; A's

Colors
- Green, gold, white

Name
- Athletics (2025–present); Oakland Athletics (1968–2024); Kansas City Athletics (1955–1967); Philadelphia Athletics (1901–1954)

Nicknames
- The A's; Swingin' A's (1971–1981); The Green Elephants; The Elephants; The Green and Gold; The Mackmen (1901–1950)

Ballpark
- Sutter Health Park (2025–present) Las Vegas Ballpark (2026–present); Oakland Coliseum (1968–2024); Municipal Stadium (1955–1967); Shibe Park (1909–1954); Columbia Park (1901–1908)

Major league titles
- World Series titles (9): 1910; 1911; 1913; 1929; 1930; 1972; 1973; 1974; 1989
- AL pennants (15): 1902; 1905; 1910; 1911; 1913; 1914; 1929; 1930; 1931; 1972; 1973; 1974; 1988; 1989; 1990
- West division titles (17): 1971; 1972; 1973; 1974; 1975; 1981; 1988; 1989; 1990; 1992; 2000; 2002; 2003; 2006; 2012; 2013; 2020
- Wild card berths (4): 2001; 2014; 2018; 2019
- * San Francisco Giants: Philadelphia Phillies

Front office
- Principal owner: John Fisher
- President: Marc Badain
- President of baseball operations: Taylor Smith
- General manager: Cam Castro
- Manager: Mark Kotsay
- Website: mlb.com/athletics

The Athletics (Note: While in West Sacramento, the team is being referred to as simply the "Athletics" and "A's", with no city name attached.) (often referred to as the A's) are an American professional baseball team based in West Sacramento, California. The Athletics compete in Major League Baseball (MLB) as a member club of the American League (AL) West Division. The team plays its home games at Sutter Health Park in West Sacramento and is approved to relocate to the Las Vegas metropolitan area for the 2028 season. The franchise's nine World Series championships, 15 pennants, and 17 division titles are the second most in the AL after the New York Yankees.

One of the AL's eight charter franchises, the team was founded in 1901 as the Philadelphia Athletics. They won three World Series championships in 1910, 1911, and 1913, and back-to-back titles in 1929 and 1930. The team's owner and manager for its first 50 years was Connie Mack, and Hall of Fame players included Chief Bender, Frank "Home Run" Baker, Jimmie Foxx, and Lefty Grove. The team left Philadelphia for Kansas City, Missouri, in 1955 and became the Kansas City Athletics before moving to Oakland, California, in 1968 and becoming the Oakland Athletics. The Athletics played their home games at the Oakland Coliseum from 1968 until 2024. Nicknamed the "Swingin' A's", under owner Charlie O. Finley they won three consecutive World Series in 1972, 1973, and 1974, led by players including Vida Blue, Catfish Hunter, Reggie Jackson, and Rollie Fingers. After being sold by Finley to Walter A. Haas Jr., the team won three consecutive pennants and the 1989 World Series behind the "Bash Brothers", Jose Canseco and Mark McGwire, as well as Hall of Famers Dennis Eckersley and Rickey Henderson and manager Tony La Russa. In 2002, the Athletics set an American League record for most consecutive wins in a season with 20, marking the pioneering application of sabermetrics in baseball. (Note: The streak record was later broken by the 2017 Cleveland Indians.)

From 1901 through the end of 2025, the franchise's overall win–loss record is 9,405–9,945–87 (.486), and a 76–86 (.469) record since moving to West Sacramento in 2025.

== History ==
The history of the Athletics Major League Baseball franchise spans from 1901 to the present day, having begun in Philadelphia before moving to Kansas City in 1955, Oakland, California, in 1968, and finally Sacramento, California, in 2025. The A's made their Bay Area debut on April 17, 1968, with a 4–1 loss to the Baltimore Orioles at the Coliseum, in front of an opening-night crowd of 50,164. With four locations, the A's have had the most home cities of any MLB team.

=== Team name and "A" logo ===
The Athletics' name originated in the term "Athletic Club" for local gentlemen's clubs—dates to 1860 when an amateur baseball team, the Athletic (Club) of Philadelphia, was formed. The team later turned professional in 1875, becoming a charter member of the National League in 1876, but were expelled from the N.L. after one season. A later version of the Athletics played in the American Association from 1882 to 1891.

=== Elephant mascot ===
After New York Giants manager John McGraw told reporters that Philadelphia manufacturer Benjamin Shibe, who owned the controlling interest in the new team, had a "white elephant on his hands", team manager Connie Mack defiantly adopted the white elephant as the team mascot, and presented McGraw with a stuffed toy elephant at the start of the 1905 World Series. McGraw and Mack had known each other for years, and McGraw accepted it graciously. By 1909, the A's were wearing an elephant logo on their sweaters, and in 1918 it turned up on the regular uniform jersey for the first time.

In 1963, when the A's were located in Kansas City, then-owner Charlie Finley changed the team mascot from an elephant to a mule, the state animal of Missouri. This is rumored to have been done by Finley in order to appeal to fans from the region who were predominantly Democrats at the time. (Traditionally, the symbol for the Republican Party is an elephant, while the Democratic Party's symbol is a donkey.) From 1988, the Athletics' 21st season in Oakland, through their final season in Oakland in 2024, an illustration of an elephant adorned the left sleeve of the A's home and road uniforms. Ahead of the team's first season in Sacramento, the elephant patch was removed and replaced with one depicting Sacramento's Tower Bridge.

Beginning in the mid-1980s, the on-field costumed incarnation of the A's elephant mascot went by the name Harry Elephante, a play on the name of singer Harry Belafonte. In 1997, he became Stomper, debuting Opening Night on April 2.

== Uniforms ==
Over the seasons, the Athletics' uniforms have paid homage to their amateur forebears. Until 1954, when the uniforms had "Athletics" spelled out in script across the front, the team's name never appeared on either home or road uniforms. Furthermore, neither "Philadelphia" nor the letter "P" appeared on the uniform or cap. The Philadelphia uniform had only a script "A" on the left front, and likewise the cap usually had the same "A" on it. In the early days of the American League, the standings listed the club as "Athletic" rather than "Philadelphia", in keeping with the old tradition. Eventually, the city name came to be used for the team, as with the other major league clubs.

After buying the team in 1960, owner Charles O. Finley introduced road uniforms with "Kansas City" printed on them, with an interlocking "KC" on the cap. Upon moving to Oakland, the "A" cap emblem was restored, and in 1970 an "apostrophe-s" was added to the cap and uniform emblem to reflect that Finley was officially changing the team's name to the "A's".

While in Kansas City, Finley changed the team's colors from their traditional red, white and blue to kelly green and gold. It was here that he began experimenting with dramatic uniforms to match these bright colors, such as gold sleeveless tops with green undershirts and gold pants. The uniform innovations increased after the team's move to Oakland, which came with the introduction of polyester pullover uniforms.

During their dynasty years in the 1970s, the A's had dozens of uniform combinations with jerseys and pants in all three team colors, and never wore the traditional gray on the road, instead wearing green or gold, which helped to contribute to their nickname of "The Swingin' A's". After the team's sale to the Haas family, the team changed its primary color to a more subdued forest green in 1982 and began a move back to more traditional uniforms.

The 2023 team wore home uniforms with "Athletics" spelled out in script writing and road uniforms with "Oakland" spelled out in script writing, with the cap logo consisting of the traditional "A" with "apostrophe-s". The home cap, which was also the team's road cap until 1992, is forest green with a gold bill and white lettering. This design was also the basis of their batting helmet, which is used both at home and on the road. The road cap, which initially debuted in 1993, is all-forest green. The first version had the white "A's" wordmark before it was changed to gold the following season. An all-forest green batting helmet was paired with this cap until 2008. In 2014, the "A's" wordmark returned to white but added gold trim.

From 1994 until 2013, the A's wore green alternate jerseys with the word "Athletics" in gold, for both road and home games.

During the 2000s, the Athletics introduced black as one of their colors. They began wearing a black alternate jersey with "Athletics" written in green. After a brief discontinuance, the A's brought back the black jersey, this time with "Athletics" written in white with gold highlights. The cap paired with this jersey is all-black, initially with the green and white-trimmed "A's" wordmark, before switching to a white and gold-trimmed "A's" wordmark. Commercially popular but rarely chosen as the alternate by players, the black uniform was retired in 2011 in favor of a gold alternate jersey.

The gold alternate has "A's" in green trimmed in white on the left chest. With the exception of several road games during the 2011 season, the Athletics' gold uniforms were used as the designated home alternates. A green version of their gold alternates was introduced for the 2014 season, serving as a replacement to the previous green alternates. The new green alternates featured the piping, "A's" and lettering in white with gold trim.

In 2018, as part of the franchise's 50th anniversary since the move to Oakland, the A's wore a kelly green alternate uniform with "Oakland" in white with gold trim, and was paired with an all-kelly green cap. This set was later worn with an alternate kelly green helmet with gold visor. This uniform eventually supplanted the gold alternates by 2019, and in 2022, after the forest green alternate was retired, it became the team's only active alternate uniform.

The nickname "A's" has long been used interchangeably with "Athletics", dating to the team's early days when headline writers used it to shorten the name. From 1972 through 1980, the team name was officially "Oakland A's", although the Commissioner's Trophy, given out annually to the winner of baseball's World Series, still listed the team's name as the "Oakland Athletics" on the gold-plated pennant representing the Oakland franchise. According to Bill Libby's Book, Charlie O and the Angry A's, owner Charlie O. Finley banned the word "Athletics" from the club's name because he felt that name was too closely associated with former Philadelphia Athletics owner Connie Mack, and he wanted the name "Oakland A's" to become just as closely associated with him. The name also vaguely suggested the name of the old minor league Oakland Oaks, which were alternatively called the "Acorns". New owner Walter Haas restored the official name to "Athletics" in 1981, but retained the nickname "A's" for marketing. At first, the word "Athletics" was restored only to the club's logo, underneath the much larger stylized-"A" that had come to represent the team since the early days. By 1987, however, the word returned, in script lettering, to the front of the team's jerseys.

After the team's departure from Oakland, the existing uniform set was mostly retained aside from the wordmark on the road uniform being changed from "Oakland" to "Athletics". The gold alternate uniform also returned after it was last worn in 2018. From 2025 to 2027, while the team temporarily plays its home games in West Sacramento, all of its uniforms feature the "Athletics" wordmark, with no mention of a home city. However, all uniforms feature a green logo patch on one sleeve depicting one of the towers of the Sacramento Tower Bridge and "Sacramento" written under it in yellow text to commemorate the team's temporary home. On the other sleeve, an ad patch sponsoring the Las Vegas Convention and Visitors Authority ("LAS Vegas" tourism logo) was added; both patches are worn interchangeably depending on a player's handedness, with the ad patch typically the more visible mark when a player bats.

The Athletics updated their gold alternate uniform with a script "Sacramento" on the chest, which they would wear starting in 2026. They plan to wear the uniform every Friday home game, with the option to wear them on other days as well. The Athletics eventually announced they would wear them on Saturday home games, which the team dubbed as "Sacramento Saturdays".

Prior to the mid-2010s, the A's had a long-standing tradition of wearing white cleats team-wide (in line with the standard MLB practice that required all uniformed team members to wear a base cleat color), which dated to the Finley ownership. Since the mid-2010s, however, MLB has gradually relaxed its shoe color rules, and several A's players began wearing cleats in non-white colors, such as Jed Lowrie's green cleats.

== Planned relocation to Las Vegas ==
Following the California Golden Seals' relocation to Cleveland in 1976, the Golden State Warriors' move across the bay to San Francisco in 2019, and the Oakland Raiders' move to the Las Vegas metropolitan area in 2020, the Athletics were left as the sole remaining major professional sports team in Oakland. However, on April 20, 2023, the Athletics announced they had entered a land purchase agreement with Red Rock Resort located near Las Vegas to build a new ballpark on the Las Vegas Strip, finalizing their plans to relocate to the Las Vegas area. On May 9, 2023, the Athletics switched their planned location in the Las Vegas area to the site of the Tropicana Las Vegas hotel and casino, which permanently closed on April 2, 2024, and was subsequently demolished on October 9, 2024, to construct a 33,000-seat partially retractable ballpark and a 1,500-room hotel and casino. By June 15, 2023, Nevada governor Joe Lombardo signed an MLB stadium funding bill known as SB1 into law after the bill was approved by the Nevada Legislature, and the Athletics officially announced they would begin the relocation process.

On November 16, 2023, the Athletics' move to Las Vegas was unanimously approved by MLB team owners. According to the team, the new Las Vegas ballpark will not be completed until 2028. The lease to the Oakland Coliseum expired after the 2024 season. Before the scheduled move to Las Vegas in 2028, the team is playing in West Sacramento, California, at Sutter Health Park (home of the San Francisco Giants' Triple-A affiliate, the Sacramento River Cats) for the 2025–2027 seasons (with an option for the 2028 season if necessary). While in West Sacramento, the team is referred to as simply the "A's" and "Athletics," with no city name attached. The relocation marks the first move by an MLB team since the Montreal Expos moved to Washington, D.C. becoming the Washington Nationals in 2005.

The Athletics are scheduled to play in Las Vegas for the first time in 2026, with six games scheduled in June at Las Vegas Ballpark. The new Las Vegas Stadium, currently unnamed, is on track to open by 2028.

On January 6, 2026, the Associated Press reported that the U.S. Patent and Trademark Office had denied the A's request to trademark the names "Las Vegas Athletics" and "Vegas Athletics", leaving the future of the franchise's name in doubt.

== Rivalries ==
=== San Francisco Giants ===
The Bay Bridge Series was the name of a series of games played between the A's and San Francisco Giants of the National League. The series took its name from the San Francisco–Oakland Bay Bridge which links the cities of Oakland and San Francisco. Although competitive, the regional rivalry between the A's and Giants was considered by some a friendly one with mutual companionship between the fans, as opposed to White Sox–Cubs, or Yankees–Mets games where animosity runs high. Hats displaying both teams on the cap were sold from vendors at the games, and once in a while the teams would both dress in original team uniforms from the early era of baseball.

The series was also sometimes referred to as the "BART Series" for the Bay Area Rapid Transit system that links Oakland and San Francisco. However, the name was never popular beyond a small selection of history books and national broadcasters and had fallen out of favor. Bay Area locals almost exclusively referred to the rivalry as the "Battle of the Bay".

Originally, the term described a series of exhibition games played between the two clubs after the conclusion of spring training and immediately prior to the start of the regular season. It was first used to refer to the 1989 World Series in which the Athletics won their most recent championship and the first time the teams had met since they moved to the San Francisco Bay Area (and the first time they had met since the A's also defeated the Giants in the 1913 World Series). Later it referred to games played between the teams during the regular season from the commencement of interleague play in 1997 through the 2024 regular season. At the conclusion of the rivalry, due to the Athletics relocating out of the Bay Area, the Athletics had won 76 games and the Giants had won 72 contests.

The A's also had the edge on the Giants in terms of overall postseason appearances (21–13), division titles (17–10) and World Series titles (4–3) since both teams had moved to the Bay Area, even though the Giants franchise moved there a decade earlier than the A's did.

On March 24, 2018, the Oakland A's announced that for the Sunday, March 25, 2018, exhibition game against the San Francisco Giants, A's fans would be charged $30 for parking and Giants fans would be charged $50. However, the A's stated that Giants fans could receive $20 off if they shout "Go A's" at the parking gates.

In 2018, the Athletics and Giants started battling for a "Bay Bridge" Trophy made from steel taken from the old east span of the Bay Bridge, which was taken down after the new span was opened in 2013. The A's won the inaugural season with the trophy, allowing them to place their logo atop its Bay Bridge stand. When the A's left Oakland, the Giants had won the trophy 4 times, to the A's 3.

Following the Athletics' temporary relocation to West Sacramento in 2025, the series began to be referred to as the "Interstate 80 Series", after the highway connecting San Francisco with Sacramento.

=== Los Angeles Angels ===
The A's have held a rivalry with the Los Angeles Angels since their relocation to California in 1968, and the charter membership of both teams in the AL West in 1969. The A's and Angels have often competed for the division title. The peak of the rivalry was during the early part of the millennium as both teams were perennial contenders. During the 2002 season, the A's famous "Moneyball" tactics led them to a league record 20-game winning streak, knocking the Angels out of the first seed in the division. The A's finished 4 games ahead while the Angels secured the Wild Card berth. Despite the 103-win season for Oakland, they lost to the underdog Minnesota Twins in the ALDS. The Angels beat the heavily favored New York Yankees, then beat the Twins, and then won the 2002 World Series. During the 2004 season, the teams were tied for wins headed into the final week of September with the last three games being played in Oakland against the Angels. Both teams were battling to secure the division championship. Oakland lost two of the three games to the Angels, and they were eliminated from the playoff hunt. The Angels were swept in the playoffs by the eventual champion Boston Red Sox. The Athletics lead the series 541–491, and the two teams have yet to meet in the postseason.

=== Philadelphia Phillies ===
The City Series was the name of baseball games played between the Philadelphia Athletics and the Philadelphia Phillies of the National League, that ran from 1903 through 1955. After the A's move to Kansas City in 1955, the City Series rivalry came to an end. Since the introduction of interleague play in 1997, the teams have since faced each other during the regular season (with the first games taking place in 2003) but the rivalry had effectively died in the intervening years since the A's left Philadelphia. In 2014, when the A's faced the Phillies in inter-league play at the Oakland Coliseum, the Athletics did not bother to mark the historical connection, going so far as to have a Connie Mack promotion the day before the series while the Texas Rangers were in Oakland.

The first City Series was held in 1883 between the Phillies and the American Association Philadelphia Athletics. When the Athletics first joined the American League, the two teams played each other in a spring and fall series. No City Series was held in 1901 and 1902 because of legal warring between the National League and American League.

== Achievements ==
=== Awards ===
- The Athletics give out an award named the Catfish Hunter Award since 2004 for the most inspirational Athletic.

=== Hall of Famers ===
Athletics Hall of Famers
Affiliation according to the National Baseball Hall of Fame and Museum
Philadelphia Athletics

**Home Run Baker** *
**Chief Bender** *
Ty Cobb
Mickey Cochrane *

Eddie Collins
Jimmy Collins
Stan Coveleski
Elmer Flick

Nellie Fox
Jimmie Foxx *
Lefty Grove *
Waite Hoyt
George Kell

Nap Lajoie
Connie Mack *
Herb Pennock
**Eddie Plank** *

**Al Simmons** *
Tris Speaker
**Rube Waddell** *
Zack Wheat

Kansas City Athletics

Luke Appling

Lou Boudreau

Whitey Herzog
Tommy Lasorda

Satchel Paige

Enos Slaughter

Oakland Athletics

Dick Allen
Harold Baines
Orlando Cepeda
**Dennis Eckersley** *

**Rollie Fingers** *
Goose Gossage
**Rickey Henderson** *
Catfish Hunter *

Reggie Jackson *
Tony La Russa
Willie McCovey
Joe Morgan

Dave Parker
Mike Piazza
Tim Raines
Don Sutton

Frank Thomas
Billy Williams
**Dick Williams**

- Players and managers listed in **bold** are depicted on their Hall of Fame plaques wearing a Athletics cap insignia.
- * Philadelphia / Kansas City / Oakland Athletics listed as primary team according to the Hall of Fame

=== Ford C. Frick Award recipients ===
Oakland Athletics Ford C. Frick Award recipients
Affiliation according to the National Baseball Hall of Fame and Museum

Harry Caray
Herb Carneal

Al Helfer
Bill King

By Saam
Lon Simmons

- **Names in bold** received the award based primarily on their work as broadcasters for the Athletics.

=== Retired numbers ===
The Athletics have retired six numbers; additionally, Walter A. Haas, Jr., owner of the team from 1980 until his death in 1995, was honored by the retirement of the letter "A". Of the six players with retired numbers, five were retired for their play with the Athletics and one, 42, was universally retired by Major League Baseball when they honored the 50th anniversary of Jackie Robinson's breaking the color barrier. No A's player from the Philadelphia era has his number retired by the organization. Though Jackson and Hunter played small portions of their careers in Kansas City, no player that played the majority of his years in the Kansas City era has his number retired either. The A's have retired only the numbers of Hall-of-Famers who played large portions of their careers in Oakland. The Athletics have all of the numbers of the Hall-of-Fame players from the Philadelphia Athletics displayed at their stadium, as well as all of the years that the Philadelphia Athletics won World Championships (1910, 1911, 1913, 1929, and 1930). Dave Stewart was about to have his #34 jersey retired by the Athletics in 2020, but the ceremony was postponed until further notice, due to the COVID-19 pandemic. Questions were raised if there would be a formal ceremony after no news about a reschedule happened in 2021 before it was announced in April 2022 that Stewart would have his jersey retired on September 11, 2022. Stewart broke the A's tradition in that his number was a re-retirement, as well as his not being in the Hall of Fame.

Reggie
Jackson
RF

Retired May 22, 2004
Rickey
Henderson
LF

Retired August 1, 2009
Catfish
Hunter
P

Retired June 9, 1991
Rollie
Fingers
P

Retired July 5, 1993
Dave
Stewart
P

Retired September 11, 2022
Dennis
Eckersley
P

Retired August 13, 2005
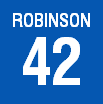
Jackie
Robinson
All MLB

Retired April 15, 1997
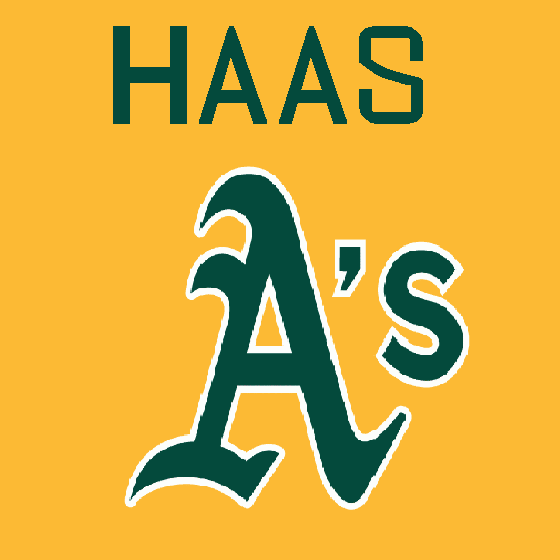
Walter A.
Haas Jr.
Owner

Honored
1995

=== Athletics Hall of Fame ===
On August 14, 2018, the team publicly announced the creation of a team Hall of Fame, complete with the first seven names to be inducted. On September 5, the Athletics held a ceremony to induct seven members into the inaugural class. Each member was honored with an unveiling of a painting in their likeness and a bright green jacket. Hunter, who died in 1999, was represented by his widow, while Finley, who died in 1996, was represented by his son. If the team ever gets a new stadium, a physical site will be designated for the Hall of Fame, as the Coliseum does not have enough space for a full-fledged exhibit. In August 2021, it was announced that players Sal Bando, Eric Chavez, Joe Rudi, director of player development Keith Lieppman, and clubhouse manager Steve "Vuc" Vucinich would be part of the class of 2022; in November 2021, Ray Fosse, who had died the previous month, was posthumously inducted into the Hall of Fame. The 2023 & 2024 classes were inducted in August of each respective year.

Key
**Bold**	Member of the Baseball Hall of Fame
†	Member of the Baseball Hall of Fame as an Athletic
**Bold**	Recipient of the Hall of Fame's Ford C. Frick Award

**Athletics Hall of Fame**
Year	No.	Player	Position	Tenure
2018	43	**Dennis Eckersley**^{†}	P	1987–1995
2018	32, 38, 34	**Rollie Fingers**^{†}	P	1968–1976
2018	39, 35, 22, 24	**Rickey Henderson**^{†}	LF	1979–1984; 1989–1993; 1994–1995; 1998
2018	27	**Catfish Hunter**	P	1965–1974
2018	9, 44	**Reggie Jackson**	RF	1967–1975; 1987
2018	34, 35	Dave Stewart	P	1986–1992; 1995
2018	—	Charlie Finley	Owner; General Manager	1960–1981
2019	10, 11, 22, 29, 42	**Tony La Russa**	IF; Manager	1963; 1968–1971; 1986–1995
2019	14, 17, 21, 28, 35	Vida Blue	P	1969–1977
2019	19	Bert "Campy" Campaneris	SS	1964–1976
2019	25	Mark McGwire	1B	1986–1997
2019	—	Walter A. Haas, Jr.	Owner	1981–1995
2021	—	**Connie Mack**^{†}	Manager; Owner	1901–1950; 1901–1954
2021	—	**Eddie Collins**	2B	1906–1914; 1927–1930
2021	—	**Frank "Home Run" Baker**^{†}	3B	1908–1914
2021	—	**Charles "Chief" Bender**^{†}	P	1903–1914
2021	2	**Mickey Cochrane**	C	1925–1933
2021	2, 3	**Jimmie Foxx**	1B	1925–1935
2021	10	**Lefty Grove**	P	1925–1933
2021	—	**Eddie Plank**^{†}	P	1901–1914
2021	6, 7, 28, 32	**Al Simmons**^{†}	LF; Coach	1924–1932; 1940–1941, 1944; 1940–1945
2021	—	**Rube Waddell**^{†}	P	1902–1907
2022	30, 3	Eric Chavez	3B	1998–2010
2022	6	Sal Bando	3B	1966–1976
2022	15, 45, 8, 36, 26	Joe Rudi	LF / 1B	1967–1976; 1982
2022	10	Ray Fosse	C Broadcaster	1973–1975; 1986–2021
2022	—	Keith Lieppman	Director of Player Development	1971–present
2022	—	Steve Vucinich	Clubhouse manager	1966–present
2023	16	Jason Giambi	LF / 1B	1995–2001; 2009
2023	26, 7, 4	Bob Johnson	LF	1933–1942
2023	5, 4	Carney Lansford	3B	1983–1992
2023	24, 38, 18	Gene Tenace	C / 1B	1969–1976
2023	—	Roy Steele	Public address announcer	1968–2005; 2007–2008
2024	33	Jose Canseco	RF / DH	1985–1992; 1997
2024	1	Eddie Joost	SS; Manager	1947–1954; 1954
2024	36	Terry Steinbach	C	1986–1996
2024	4	Miguel Tejada	SS	1997–2003
2024	23	**Dick Williams**^{†}	LF / 3B; Manager	1959–1960; 1971–1973
2024	—	**Bill King**	Broadcaster	1981–2005
2025	52, 15	Tim Hudson	P	1999–2004
2025	20	Mark Mulder	P	2000–2004
2025	53, 75	Barry Zito	P	2000–2006
2025	—	Monte Moore	Broadcaster	1962–1992
2026	42	Dave Henderson	CF	1988–1993
2026	14	Mark Ellis	2B	2002–2003, 2005–2011
2026	13	Blue Moon Odom	P	1964–1975
2026	-	Sandy Alderson	GM	1981–1998

=== Bay Area Sports Hall of Fame ===
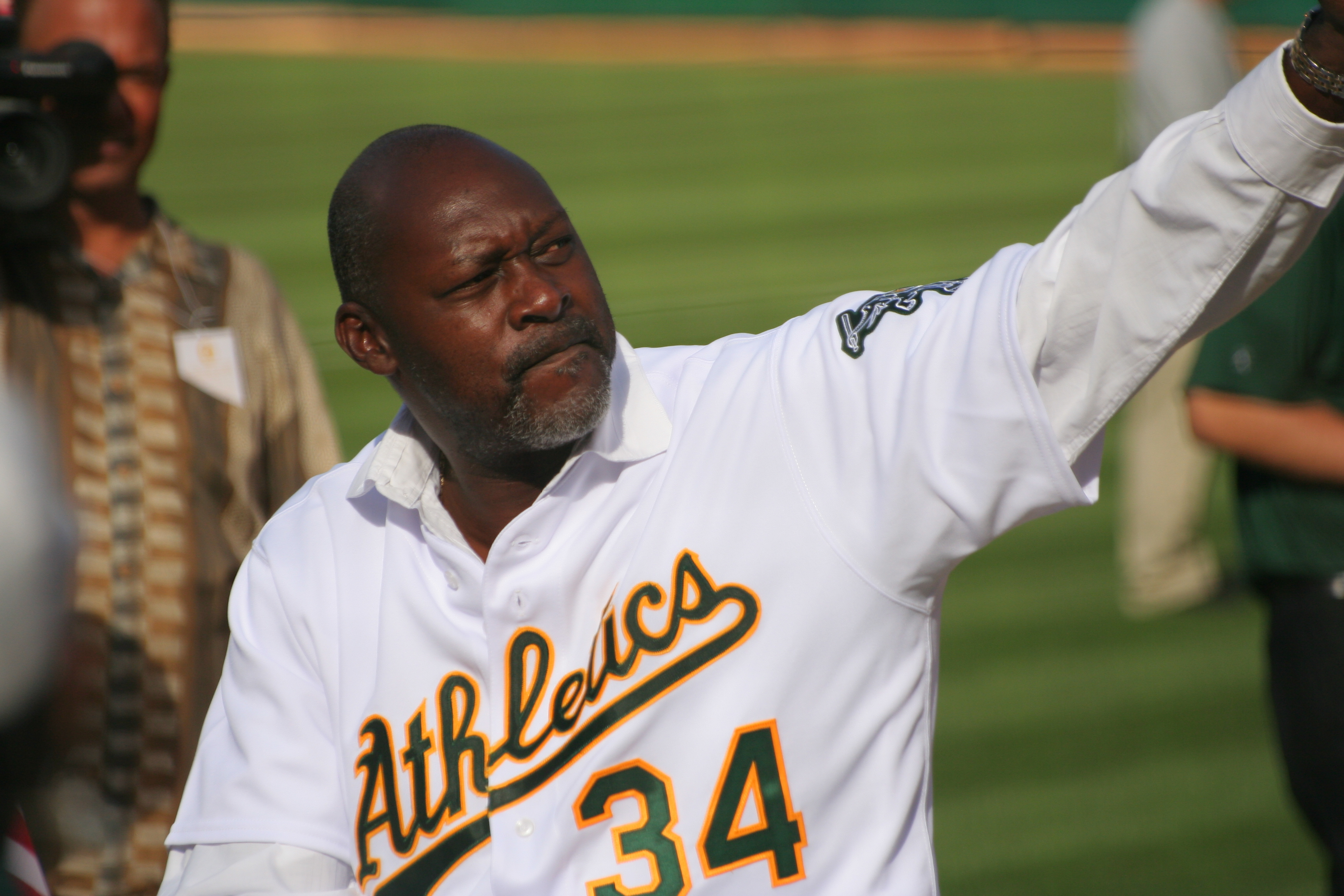
Dave Stewart, Oakland Athletics pitcher from 1986 to 1992 and 1995

17 members of the Athletics organization have been honored with induction into the Bay Area Sports Hall of Fame.

**Athletics in the Bay Area Sports Hall of Fame**
No.	Player	Position	Tenure	Notes
12	Dusty Baker	OF	1985–1986	
14, 17, 21, 28, 35	Vida Blue	P	1969–1977	
19	Bert "Campy" Campaneris	SS	1964–1976	
12	Orlando Cepeda	1B	1972	Elected mainly on his performance with San Francisco Giants
4, 6, 10, 14	Sam Chapman	CF	1938–1941; 1945–1951	Born and raised in Tiburon, California
43	Dennis Eckersley	P	1987–1995	Grew up in Fremont, California
32, 34, 38	Rollie Fingers	P	1968–1976	
—	Walter A. Haas, Jr.	Owner	1981–1995	Grew up in San Francisco, California, attended UC Berkeley
24	Rickey Henderson	LF	1979–1984; 1989–1993; 1994–1995; 1998	Raised in Oakland, California
27	Catfish Hunter	P	1965–1974	
9, 31, 44	Reggie Jackson	RF	1968–1975; 1987	
1	Eddie Joost	SS; Manager	1947–1954; 1954	Born and raised in San Francisco, California
10, 11, 22, 29, 42	Tony La Russa	IF; Manager	1963; 1968–1971; 1986–1995	
1, 4	Billy Martin	2B; Manager	1957; 1980–1982	Elected mainly on his performance with New York Yankees, Born in Berkeley, California
44	Willie McCovey	1B	1976	Elected mainly on his performance with San Francisco Giants
8	Joe Morgan	2B	1984	Elected mainly on his performance with Cincinnati Reds, raised in Oakland, California
19	Dave Righetti	P	1994	Born and raised in San Jose, California
34	Dave Stewart	P	1986–1992; 1995	Born and raised in Oakland, California

=== Philadelphia Baseball Wall of Fame ===
The Athletics have all of the numbers of the Hall-of-Fame players from the Philadelphia Athletics displayed at their stadium, as well as all of the years that the Philadelphia Athletics won World Championships (1910, 1911, 1913, 1929, and 1930).

Also, from 1978 to 2003 (except 1983), the Philadelphia Phillies inducted one former Athletic (and one former Phillie) each year into the Philadelphia Baseball Wall of Fame at the then-existing Veterans Stadium. 25 Athletics have been honored. In March 2004, after Veterans Stadium was replaced by the new Citizens Bank Park, the Athletics' plaques were relocated to the Philadelphia Athletics Historical Society in Hatboro, Pennsylvania, and a single plaque listing all of the A's inductees was attached to a statue of Connie Mack that is located across the street from Citizens Bank Park.

Key
Year	Year inducted
**Bold**	Member of the Baseball Hall of Fame
†	Member of the Baseball Hall of Fame as a member of the A's
**Bold**	Recipient of the Hall of Fame's Ford C. Frick Award

**Philadelphia Baseball Wall of Fame**
No.	Player	Position	Tenure	Inducted
—	**Frank "Home Run" Baker**^{†}	3B	1908–1914	1993
—	**Charles "Chief" Bender**^{†}	P	1903–1914	1991
4, 6, 10, 14	Sam Chapman	CF	1938–1951	1999
2	**Mickey Cochrane**	C	1925–1933	1982
—	**Eddie Collins**	2B	1906–1914; 1927–1930	1987
—	Jack Coombs	P	1906–1914	1992
5	Jimmy Dykes	3B/2B; Coach; Manager	1918–1932; 1940–1950; 1951–1953	1984
11	George Earnshaw	P	1928–1933	2000
5, 8	Ferris Fain	1B	1947–1952	1997
2, 3, 4	**Jimmie Foxx**	1B	1925–1935	1979
10	**Lefty Grove**	P	1925–1933	1980
4, 7, 26	"Indian Bob" Johnson	LF	1933–1942	1989
1	Eddie Joost	SS; Manager	1947–1954; 1954	1995
—	**Connie Mack**^{†}	Manager; Owner	1901–1950; 1901–1954	1978
9, 27	Bing Miller	RF	1922–1926; 1928–1934	1998
1, 2, 9, 19	Wally Moses	RF	1935–1941; 1949–1951	1988
—	Rube Oldring	CF	1906–1916; 1918	2003
—	**Eddie Plank**^{†}	P	1901–1914	1985
14	Eddie Rommel	P	1920–1932	1996
21, 30	Bobby Shantz	P	1949–1954	1994
6, 7, 28, 32	**Al Simmons**^{†}	LF; Coach	1924–1932; 1940–1941, 1944; 1940–1945	1981
10, 15, 21, 35, 38	Elmer Valo	RF	1940–1954	1990
—	**Rube Waddell**^{†}	P	1902–1907	1986
12	Rube Walberg	P	1923–1933	2002
6, 19, 30	Gus Zernial	LF	1951–1954	2001

=== Philadelphia Sports Hall of Fame ===
Athletics in the Philadelphia Sports Hall of Fame
No.	Name	Position	Tenure	Inducted	Notes
—	Connie Mack	Manager; Owner	1901–1950; 1901–1954	2004	
2, 3, 4	Jimmie Foxx	1B	1925–1935	2004	
10	Lefty Grove	P	1925–1933	2005	
6, 7, 28, 32	Al Simmons	LF; Coach	1924–1932; 1940–1941, 1944; 1940–1945	2006	
2	Mickey Cochrane	C	1925–1933	2007	
—	Eddie Collins	2B	1906–1914; 1927–1930	2009	
21, 30	Bobby Shantz	P	1949–1954	2010	
5	Jimmy Dykes	3B/2B; Coach; Manager	1918–1932; 1940–1950; 1951–1953	2011	Born in Philadelphia
—	Eddie Plank	P	1901–1914	2012	
—	Charles "Chief" Bender	P	1903–1914	2014	
—	Herb Pennock	P	1912–1915	2014	Elected mainly on his performance with New York Yankees
—	By Saam	Broadcaster	1938–1954	2014	
4, 7, 26	Bob Johnson	LF	1933–1942	2017	
—	Home Run Baker	3B	1908–1914	2019	

=== Team captains ===
- 6 Sal Bando, 3B, 1969–1976

== Season-by-season records ==
The records of the Athletics' last ten seasons in Major League Baseball are listed below.

Season	Wins	Losses	Win %	Place	Playoffs
2016	69	93	.426	5th in AL West	
2017	75	87	.463	5th in AL West	
2018	97	65	.599	2nd in AL West	Lost ALWC vs. New York Yankees, 7–2
2019	97	65	.599	2nd in AL West	Lost ALWC vs. Tampa Bay Rays, 5–1
2020	36	24	.600	1st in AL West	Lost ALDS vs. Houston Astros, 3–1
2021	86	76	.531	3rd in AL West	
2022	60	102	.370	5th in AL West	
2023	50	112	.309	5th in AL West	
2024	69	93	.426	4th in AL West	
2025	76	86	.469	4th in AL West	
10-Year Record	715	803	.471	—	—
All-Time Record	9,405	9,859	.486	—	—

=== Philadelphia ===
- Columbia Park (1901–1908)
- Shibe Park (1909–1954)

=== Kansas City ===
- Municipal Stadium (1955–1967)

=== Oakland ===
- Oakland Coliseum (1968–2024)
  - Cashman Field in Las Vegas, Nevada (April 1996 for six games due to renovations at Oakland Coliseum)

=== West Sacramento ===
- Sutter Health Park (2025–present)

== Roster ==
Athletics 2027 spring training roster
40-man roster		Non-roster invitees	Coaches / other
Pitchers: 80 Elvis Alvarado; 63 Mason Barnett; 66 Brady Basso; -- Hunter Bigge; 49 Scott Blewett; 35 J. T. Ginn; 36 Hogan Harris; 53 Gunnar Hoglund; 52 Seth Johnson; 58 Hayden Juenger; 61 Gage Jump; 57 Jacob Lopez; 46 Luis Medina; 19 Luis Morales; 67 Kade Morris; 78 Braden Nett; 50 Jack Perkins; -- Joe Rock; 39 Drew Rom; 56 Chris Roycroft; 40 Luis Severino; 60 Justin Sterner; 70 Yunior Tur	Catchers: 23 Shea Langeliers; Infielders: 20 Zack Gelof; 2 Darell Hernáiz; 44 Joshua Kuroda-Grauer; 16 Nick Kurtz; 3 Max Muncy; 29 Donovan Walton; 47 Tommy White; 12 Alika Williams; 5 Jacob Wilson; Outfielders: 33 Henry Bolte; 4 Lawrence Butler; 1 Denzel Clarke; 26 Carlos Cortes; -- Nate Eaton; 21 Tyler Soderstrom; Designated hitters: 25 Brent Rooker		Manager: 7 Mark Kotsay; Coaches: 18 Mike Aldrete (hitting); 51 Darren Bush (bench); 28 Ryan Christenson (first base); 41 Chris Cron (assistant hitting); 8 Bobby Crosby (third base); 88 Javy Guerra (bullpen); 55 Ramón Hernández (coach and interpreter); 71 Dan Hubbs (interim pitching); 91 Dustin Hughes (bullpen catcher); 72 Marcus Jensen (quality control); 90 Christian Molfetta (bullpen catcher); 40 active, 0 inactive, 0 non-roster invitees; 7-, 10-, or 15-day injured list; * Not on active roster; ^{†} Suspended list; Roster, coaches, and NRIs updated November 2, 2026; Transactions • Depth chart; → All MLB rosters

== Minor league affiliations ==
The Athletics farm system consists of six minor league affiliates.

Class	Team	League	Location	Ballpark	Affiliated
Triple-A	Las Vegas Aviators	Pacific Coast League	Summerlin, Nevada	Las Vegas Ballpark	2019
Double-A	Midland RockHounds	Texas League	Midland, Texas	Momentum Bank Ballpark	1999
High-A	Lansing Lugnuts	Midwest League	Lansing, Michigan	Jackson Field	2021
Single-A	Stockton Ports	California League	Stockton, California	Banner Island Ballpark	2005
Rookie	ACL Athletics	Arizona Complex League	Mesa, Arizona	Fitch Park	1988
Rookie	DSL Athletics	Dominican Summer League	Boca Chica, Santo Domingo	Juan Marichal Complex	1989

== Radio and television ==
As of the 2020 season, the Athletics have had 14 radio homes. The Athletics' flagship radio station is KSTE and the team has a free live 24/7 exclusive A's station branded as A's Cast to stream the radio broadcast within the Athletics market and other A's programming via iHeartRadio. Going into the 2020 season, the Athletics had a deal with TuneIn for A's Cast and no flagship radio station in the Bay Area; due to the COVID-19 pandemic keeping fans from attending games, the team changed their plans and named KNEW as flagship. The announcing team features Ken Korach and Johnny Doskow.

Television coverage is exclusively on NBC Sports California. Some A's games air on an alternate feed of NBCS, called NBCS Plus, if the main channel shows a Sacramento Kings or San Jose Sharks game at the same time. On TV, Jenny Cavnar covers play-by-play, and Dallas Braden provides color commentary. Some games would feature Chris Caray on play-by-play; Caray is a fourth-generation baseball announcer that included great-grandfather Harry Caray, grandfather Skip Caray, and father Chip Caray.

== See also ==
- Athletics award winners and league leaders
- List of Athletics first-round draft picks
- List of Athletics managers
- List of Athletics no-hitters
- List of Oakland Athletics Opening Day starting pitchers
- List of Athletics owners and executives
- List of Athletics team records

Awards and achievements
Preceded by Pittsburgh Pirates; 1909	World Series champions Philadelphia Athletics; 1910–1911	Succeeded by Boston Red Sox; 1912
Preceded by Boston Red Sox; 1912	World Series champions Philadelphia Athletics; 1913	Succeeded by Boston Braves; 1914
Preceded by New York Yankees; 1927–1928	World Series champions Philadelphia Athletics; 1929–1930	Succeeded by St. Louis Cardinals; 1931
Preceded by Pittsburgh Pirates; 1971	World Series champions Oakland Athletics; 1972–1974	Succeeded by Cincinnati Reds; 1975–1976
Preceded by Los Angeles Dodgers; 1988	World Series champions Oakland Athletics; 1989	Succeeded by Cincinnati Reds; 1990
Preceded by Chicago White Sox; 1901	American League champions Philadelphia Athletics; 1902	Succeeded by Boston Americans; 1903
Preceded by Boston Americans; 1903	American League champions Philadelphia Athletics; 1905	Succeeded by Chicago White Sox; 1906
Preceded by Detroit Tigers; 1907–1909	American League champions Philadelphia Athletics; 1910–1911	Succeeded by Boston Red Sox; 1912
Preceded by Boston Red Sox; 1912	American League champions Philadelphia Athletics; 1913–1914	Succeeded by Boston Red Sox; 1915
Preceded by New York Yankees; 1926–1928	American League champions Philadelphia Athletics; 1929–1931	Succeeded by New York Yankees; 1932
Preceded by Baltimore Orioles; 1969–1971	American League champions Oakland Athletics; 1972–1974	Succeeded by Boston Red Sox; 1975
Preceded by Minnesota Twins; 1987	American League champions Oakland Athletics; 1988–1990	Succeeded by Minnesota Twins; 1991
