= List of Athletics managers =

The Athletics are a professional baseball team based in West Sacramento, California. The team previously played in Philadelphia, Pennsylvania from 1901 through 1954, Kansas City, Missouri from 1955 through 1967, and Oakland, California from 1968 through 2024. The Athletics are members of the American League (AL) West division in Major League Baseball (MLB). In baseball, the head coach of a team is called the manager, or more formally, the field manager. The duties of the team manager include team strategy and leadership on and off the field. The team has employed 30 different managers in its history. The current Athletics' manager is Mark Kotsay.

The franchise's first manager was Hall of Famer Connie Mack, who managed the team for its first fifty seasons. Mack led the Athletics to nine AL championships and five World Series championships—in 1910, 1911, 1913, 1929 and 1930. The team lost the World Series in 1905, 1914 and 1931, and no World Series was played when the Athletics won the AL championship in 1902. After Jimmy Dykes replaced Mack as the Athletics' manager in 1951, no manager served more than three consecutive seasons until Tony La Russa, who became the Athletics' manager in 1986. During this period, Dick Williams managed the Athletics to two consecutive World Series championships in 1972 and 1973, and Alvin Dark managed the team to a third consecutive World Series championship in 1974. La Russa managed the Athletics to three consecutive AL championships from 1988 through 1990, winning the World Series in 1989.

Connie Mack holds the Athletics' records for most games managed, 7,466; most wins as a manager, 3,582; and most losses as a manager, 3,814. Williams has the highest winning percentage of any Athletics manager, .603. Four managers have served multiple terms as the Athletics' manager. Connie Mack's son Earle Mack served as interim manager twice, in 1937 and 1939, when his father was ill. Hank Bauer served as the Athletics' manager from 1961 to 1962, and then again in 1969. Dark served as the Athletics' manager from 1966 to 1967 and again from 1974 to 1975. Jack McKeon started the 1977 season as the Athletics' manager, was replaced by Bobby Winkles after 53 games, and then replaced Winkles part way through the 1978 season. Five Athletics' managers have been inducted into the Baseball Hall of Fame: Connie Mack, Lou Boudreau, Joe Gordon, Luke Appling and Williams. Mack and Williams were inducted into the Hall of Fame as managers. Boudreau, Gordon and Appling were inducted as players.

== Key ==
#	A running total of the number of Athletics managers. Any manager who has two or more separate terms is counted only once.
G	Regular season games managed; may not equal sum of wins and losses due to tie games
W	Regular season wins
L	Regular season losses
Win%	Winning percentage
PA	Playoff appearances: number of years this manager has led the franchise to the playoffs
PW	Playoff wins
PL	Playoff losses
LC	League championships: number of league championships, or pennants, achieved by the manager
WS	World Series championships: number of World Series victories achieved by the manager
Ref	Reference
†	Inducted into the Baseball Hall of Fame primarily as a manager
*	Inducted into the Baseball Hall of Fame primarily as a player

== Managers ==
Statistics current through September 30, 2024

#	Image	Manager	Seasons	G	W	L	Win%	PA	PW	PL	LC	WS	Ref(s)
1		Connie Mack^{†}	1901–1950	7,466	3,582	3,814	.484	8	24	19	9	5	
2		Earle Mack^{[a]}	1937	34	15	17	.469	—	—	—	—	—	
—		Earle Mack^{[a]}	1939	91	30	60	.333	—	—	—	—	—	
3		Jimmy Dykes	1951–1953	466	208	254	.450	—	—	—	—	—	
4		Eddie Joost	1954	156	51	103	.331	—	—	—	—	—	
5		Lou Boudreau*	1955–1957	413	151	260	.367	—	—	—	—	—	
6		Harry Craft	1957–1959	360	162	196	.453	—	—	—	—	—	
7		Bob Elliott	1960	155	58	96	.377	—	—	—	—	—	
8		Joe Gordon*	1961	60	26	33	.441	—	—	—	—	—	
9		Hank Bauer	1961–1962	264	107	157	.405	—	—	—	—	—	
10		Eddie Lopat	1963–1964	214	90	124	.421	—	—	—	—	—	
11		Mel McGaha	1964–1965	137	45	91	.331	—	—	—	—	—	
12		Haywood Sullivan	1965	136	54	82	.397	—	—	—	—	—	
13		Alvin Dark	1966–1967	281	126	155	.448	—	—	—	—	—	
14		Luke Appling*	1967	40	10	30	.250	—	—	—	—	—	
15		Bob Kennedy	1968	163	82	80	.506	—	—	—	—	—	
—		Hank Bauer	1969	149	80	69	.537	—	—	—	—	—	
16		John McNamara	1969–1970	175	97	78	.554	—	—	—	—	—	
17		Dick Williams^{†}	1971–1973	478	288	190	.603	3	14	13	2	2	
—		Alvin Dark	1974–1975	324	188	136	.580	2	7	5	1	1	
18		Chuck Tanner	1976	161	87	74	.540	—	—	—	—	—	
19		Jack McKeon	1977	53	26	27	.491	—	—	—	—	—	
20		Bobby Winkles	1977–1978	147	61	86	.415	—	—	—	—	—	
—		Jack McKeon	1978	123	45	78	.366	—	—	—	—	—	
21		Jim Marshall	1979	162	54	108	.333	—	—	—	—	—	
22		Billy Martin	1980–1982	433	215	218	.497	1	3	3	0	0	
23		Steve Boros	1983–1984	206	94	112	.456	—	—	—	—	—	
24		Jackie Moore	1984–1986	353	163	190	.462	—	—	—	—	—	
25		Jeff Newman	1986	10	2	8	.200	—	—	—	—	—	
26		Tony La Russa^{†}	1986–1995	1,471	798	673	.542	4	19	13	3	1	
27		Art Howe	1996–2002	1,133	600	533	.530	3	6	9	0	0	
28		Ken Macha	2003–2006	648	368	280	.568	2	5	7	0	0	
29		Bob Geren	2007–2011	710	334	376	.470	—	—	—	—	—	
30		Bob Melvin	2011–2021	1,680	880	800	.524	6	7	13	0	0	
31		Mark Kotsay	2022–present	810	319	491	.393	—	—	—	—	—	

== Managers with multiples tenures ==
#	Manager	Seasons	G	W	L	WPct	PA	PW	PL	LC	WS	Ref
2^{[a]}	Earle Mack	1937, 1939	125	45	77	.369	—	—	—	—	—	
8	Hank Bauer	1961–1962, 1969	413	187	226	.453	—	—	—	—	—	
12	Alvin Dark	1966–1967; 1974–1975	605	314	291	.519	2	7	5	1	1	
18	Jack McKeon	1977, 1978	176	71	105	.403	—	—	—	—	—	

== Footnotes ==
- ^{a} Although Earle Mack managed the team for parts of the 1937 and 1939 seasons, he did so in the capacity of an interim manager while his father, Connie Mack, was ill.
