= Weldon Wyckoff =

American baseball player (1893–1961)

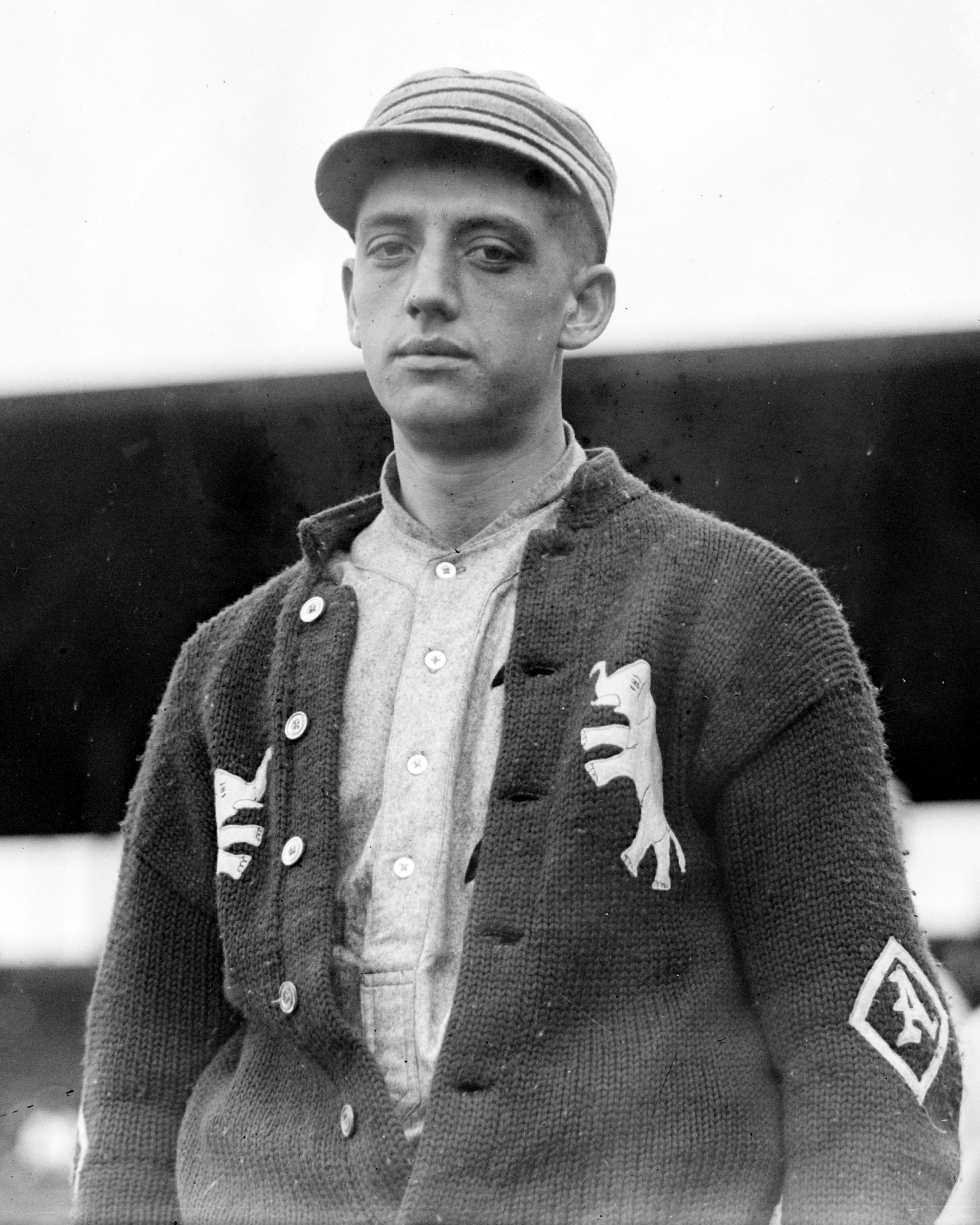
- Pitcher
- Born: February 19, 1893; Williamsport, Pennsylvania, US
- Died: May 8, 1961 (aged 69); Sheboygan Falls, Wisconsin, US
- Batted: Right Threw: Right

MLB debut
- April 19, 1913, for the Philadelphia Athletics

Last MLB appearance
- May 8, 1918, for the Boston Red Sox

MLB statistics
- Win–loss record: 23-34
- Earned run average: 3.55
- Strikeouts: 299
- Stats at Baseball Reference

Teams
- Philadelphia Athletics (1913–1916); Boston Red Sox (1916–1918)

Career highlights and awards
- World Series champion (1913)

John Weldon Wyckoff (February 19, 1893 – May 8, 1961) was a professional baseball player. A pitcher, he played all or part of six seasons in Major League Baseball for the Philadelphia Athletics (1913–1916) and Boston Red Sox (1917–1918). Wyckoff batted and threw right-handed. In some baseball resources, he is referred as John Wyckoff.

== Biography ==
Wyckoff's grave at Sheboygan Falls Cemetery

Wyckoff attended Bucknell University and began his baseball career Wilmington in the Tri-State League in 1911. He joined the Philadelphia Athletics in 1913. His most productive season was in 1914, when he recorded career-highs with 11 wins and a 3.02 ERA. Wyckoff pitched in Game One of the World Series, surrendering a run on three hits and hitting a double in his lone career World Series plate appearance.

In 1916, he led the league with 22 losses, 165 walks and 14 wild pitches. He was sent to the Boston Red Sox in the 1916 midseason. Over parts of two seasons he appeared in only nine games and was released in 1917. He ended the year with the Buffalo Bisons of the International League and rejoined Boston in 1918, his last major league season, and retired to his taxicab business in Williamsport.

In his major league career, Wyckoff posted a 23–34 record with 299 strikeouts and a 3.55 ERA in 573.2 innings pitched.

Wyckoff died in Sheboygan Falls, Wisconsin, at the age of 69, and was buried at Sheboygan Falls Cemetery.
