= Scott Perry (baseball) =

American baseball player (1891–1959)

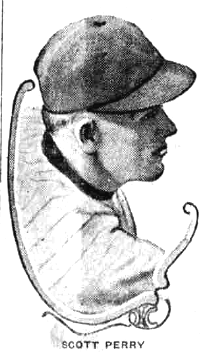
- Pitcher
- Born: April 17, 1891; Denison, Texas, U.S.
- Died: October 27, 1959 (aged 68); Kansas City, Missouri, U.S.
- Batted: Left Threw: Right

MLB debut
- May 13, 1915, for the St. Louis Browns

Last MLB appearance
- June 1, 1921, for the Philadelphia Athletics

MLB statistics
- Win–loss record: 40–68
- Earned run average: 3.07
- Strikeouts: 231
- Stats at Baseball Reference

Teams
- St. Louis Browns (1915); Chicago Cubs (1916); Cincinnati Reds (1917); Philadelphia Athletics (1918–1921)

Herbert Scott Perry (April 17, 1891 – October 27, 1959) was a professional baseball pitcher who played in Major League Baseball from 1915 to 1921 for the St. Louis Browns, Chicago Cubs, Cincinnati Reds and Philadelphia Athletics. He was born in Denison, Texas.
