= Baltimore Orioles all-time roster =

List of baseball players

This is a list of all players who have played for the Baltimore Orioles of Major League Baseball. Prior to moving to Baltimore, the franchise was known as the St. Louis Browns.

== All-time roster ==
- Names in **bold** are members of the National Baseball Hall of Fame and Museum.
- Names in italics have had their numbers retired by the team.
Note: changing the sort order below may be slow.

Player	Seasons	Pos
Don Aase	1985–1988	P
Fernando Abad	2021	P
Harry Ables	1905	P
Cal Abrams	1954–1955	OF
Winston Abreu	2006	P
Bill Abstein	1910	1B
Jeremy Accardo	2011	P
Jerry Adair	1958–1966	2B
Bobby Adams	1956	3B
Jordyn Adams	2025	OF
Ryan Adams	2011	2B
Spencer Adams	1927	2B
Willie Adams	1912–1913	P
Mike Adamson	1967–1969	P
Sam Agnew	1913–1915	C
Jesús Aguilar	2022	1B
Kurt Ainsworth	2003–2004	P
George Aiton	1912	OF
Keegan Akin	2020–present	P
Matt Albers	2008–2010	P
Hanser Alberto	2019–2020	2B
Ed Albrecht	1949–1950	P
Jay Aldrich	1990	P
Bob Alexander	1955	P
Blaze Alexander	2026-Present	IF
Doyle Alexander	1972–1976	P
Manny Alexander	1992–1993, 1995–1996	SS
Walt Alexander	1912–1913, 1915	C
Ethan Allen	1937–1938	OF
Greg Allen	2025	OF
Johnny Allen	1941	P
Logan Allen	2022	P
Sled Allen	1910	C
Mack Allison	1911–1913	P
Mel Almada	1938–1939	OF
**Roberto Alomar**	1996–1998	2B
Pete Alonso	2026-Present	1B
Dariel Álvarez	2015–2016	OF
Pedro Álvarez	2016–2018	IF
Rich Amaral	1999–2000	OF
Andy Anderson	1948–1949	SS
Brady Anderson	1988–2001	OF
John Anderson	1901–1903	1B
John Anderson	1960	P
Mike Anderson	1978	OF
Shaun Anderson	2021	P
Robert Andino	2009–2012	SS
John Andreoli	2018	OF
Ivy Andrews	1934–1936	P
Matt Angle	2011	CF
**Luis Aparicio**	1963–1967	SS
Pete Appleton	1942–1945	P
Greg Aquino	2008	P
Jayson Aquino	2016–2018	P
Pedro Araújo	2018–2019	P
Jonathan Araúz	2022	2B/SS
George Archie	1941, 1946	3B
Danny Ardoin	2006	C
Hank Arft	1948–1952	1B
Shawn Armstrong	2019–2021	P
Tony Arnold	1986–1987	P
Jake Arrieta	2010–2013	P
Jairo Asencio	2013	P
Alec Asher	2017	P
Garrett Atkins	2010	1B
Mitch Atkins	2011	P
Michael Aubrey	2009	1B
Elden Auker	1940–1942	P
Jimmy Austin	1911–1929	3B
Xavier Avery	2012	OF
Bobby Ávila	1959	2B
Benny Ayala	1979–1984	OF
Luis Ayala	2012–2013	P
Art Bader	1904	OF
Red Badgro	1929–1930	OF
Ed Baecht	1937	P
Danys Báez	2007–2009	P
Grover Baichley	1914	P
Bill Bailey	1907–1912	P
Bob Bailor	1975–1976	OF
**Harold Baines**	1993–1995, 1997–2000	DH
Bryan Baker	2022-2025	P
Floyd Baker	1943–1944	3B
Frank Baker	1973–1974	SS
Paul Bako	2007	C
James Baldwin	2005	P
John Bale	2001	P
Mike Balenti	1913	SS
Jeff Ballard	1987–1991	P
Win Ballou	1926–1927	P
George Bamberger	1959	P
Rylan Bannon	2022	3B
David Bañuelos	2024–2025	C
Steve Barber	1960–1967	P
Bret Barberie	1995	2B
Ray Barker	1960	1B
Red Barkley	1937	2B
Edgar Barnhart	1924	P
Ed Barnowski	1965–1966	P
Manny Barreda	2021	P
Samuel Basallo	2025-present	C/1B
Brian Bass	2008–2009	P
Kevin Bass	1995	OF
Tony Batista	2001–2003	3B
Matt Batts	1951	C
Rick Bauer	2001–2005	P
Russ Bauers	1950	P
Mike Baumann	2021–2024	P
George Baumgardner	1912–1916	P
Denny Bautista	2004	P
Félix Bautista	2022–present	P
José Bautista	1988–1991	P
José Bautista	2004	OF/3B
Don Baylor	1970–1975	DH
Bill Bayne	1919–1924	P
Eduard Bazardo	2023	P
Charlie Beamon	1956–1958	P
Gene Bearden	1952	P
Dylan Beavers	2025-Present	OF
Steve Bechler	2002	P
Boom-Boom Beck	1924–1928	P
Rich Becker	1998	OF
Tim Beckham	2017-2018	SS
Érik Bédard	2002, 2004–2007	P
Fred Beene	1968–1970	P
Ollie Bejma	1934–1936	2B
Mark Belanger	1965–1981	SS
Mike Belfiore	2013	P
Beau Bell	1935–1939	OF
Eric Bell	1985–1987	P
Josh Bell	2010–2011	3B
Juan Bell	1989–1991	2B
Rob Bell	2007	P
Albert Belle	1999–2000	OF
Anthony Bemboom	2022–2023	C
Benny Bengough	1931–1932	C
Juan Beníquez	1986	OF
Armando Benítez	1994–1998	P
Fred Bennett	1928	OF
Herschel Bennett	1923–1927	OF
Joel Bennett	1998	P
Kris Benson	2006	P
Johnny Berardino	1939–1947, 1951	2B
Brad Bergesen	2009–2011	P
Jason Berken	2009–2012	P
Johnny Bero	1951	SS
Gerónimo Berroa	1997	DH
Neil Berry	1953–1954	SS
Quintin Berry	2014	OF
Frank Bertaina	1964–1967, 1969	P
Fred Besana	1956	P
Wilson Betemit	2012–2013	3B
Larry Bettencourt	1928–1932	OF
Vern Bickford	1954	P
Randor Bierd	2008	P
Larry Bigbie	2001–2005	OF
Ivan Bigler	1917	PR
Jim Bilbrey	1949	P
Emil Bildilli	1937–1941	P
Josh Billings	1919–1923	C
George Binks	1948	OF
Kurt Birkins	2006–2007	P
Babe Birrer	1956	P
Frank Biscan	1942–1948	P
Rivington Bisland	1913	SS
Ty Blach	2019	P
John Black	1911	1B
George Blaeholder	1925–1935	P
Paul Blair	1964–1976	OF
Casey Blake	2001	3B
Sheriff Blake	1937	P
Curt Blefary	1965–1968	OF
Richard Bleier	2017–2020	P
Bert Blue	1908	C
Lu Blue	1928–1930	1B
Scott Blewett	2025	P
Mike Blyzka	1953–1954	P
Mike Boddicker	1980–1988	P
George Boehler	1920–1921	P
Bernie Boland	1921	P
Charlie Bold	1914	1B
Stew Bolen	1926–1927	P
Tom Bolton	1994	P
George Bone	1901	SS
Ricky Bones	1999	P
Julio Bonetti	1937–1938	P
Bobby Bonilla	1995–1996	3B
Juan Bonilla	1986	2B
Luther Bonin	1913	OF
Bobby Bonner	1980–1983	SS
Danny Boone	1990	P
Julio Borbón	2016	OF
Rich Bordi	1986	P
Mike Bordick	1997–2002	SS
Dave Borkowski	2004	P
Joe Borowski	1995	P
Babe Borton	1916	1B
Shawn Boskie	1997	P
Jim Bottomley	1936–1937	1B
Michael Bourn	2016	OF
Benny Bowcock	1903	2B
Tim Bowden	1914	OF
Sam Bowens	1963–1967	OF
Brent Bowers	1996	OF
Matt Bowman	2024–2025	P
Bob Boyd	1956–1960	1B
Ray Boyd	1910	P
Gene Brabender	1966–1968	P
Brad Brach	2014–2018	P
Chad Bradford	2007–2008	P
Kyle Bradish	2022–present	P
George Bradley	1946	OF
Phil Bradley	1989–1990	OF
Jackie Brandt	1960–1965	OF
Otis Brannan	1928–1929	2B
Garland Braxton	1931–1933	P
Lesli Brea	2000–2001	P
Harry Brecheen	1953	P
Marv Breeding	1960–1962	2B
Jim Brideweser	1954	SS
Parker Bridwell	2016	P
Bunny Brief	1912–1913	1B
Nelson Briles	1977	P
Chris Britton	2006	P
Zach Britton	2011–2018	P
Chris Brock	2002	P
Herman Bronkie	1919–1922	3B
Aaron Brooks	2019	P
Jim Brower	2006	P
Bill Brown	1912	OF
Curly Brown	1911–1913	P
Dick Brown	1963–1965	C
Elmer Brown	1911–1912	P
Hal Brown	1955–1962	P
Jarvis Brown	1995	OF
Kevin Brown	1995	P
Larry Brown	1973	SS
Lloyd Brown	1933	P
Mark Brown	1984	P
Marty Brown	1990	3B
Walter Brown	1947	P
**Willard Brown**	1947	OF
Keon Broxton	2019	OF
Vidal Bruján	2025	2B/OF
Jack Bruner	1950	P
George Brunet	1963	P
Ed Bruyette	1901	OF
Jim Buchanan	1905	P
Fritz Buelow	1907	C
Damon Buford	1993–1995	OF
Don Buford	1968–1972	OF
Ryan Bukvich	2008	P
Al Bumbry	1972–1984	OF
Dylan Bundy	2012, 2016–2019	P
Wally Bunker	1963–1968	P
Zack Burdi	2021	P
Chris Burkam	1915	?
Jimmy Burke	1901	3B
Leo Burke	1958–1959	OF
Pat Burke	1924	3B
Jesse Burkett	1902–1904	OF
Rick Burleson	1987	SS
Corbin Burnes	2024	P
Alex Burnett	2013	P
Johnny Burnett	1935	SS
Jack Burns	1930–1936	1B
Pete Burnside	1963	P
Brian Burres	2006–2008	P
Bill Burwell	1920–1921	P
Jim Busby	1957–1958, 1960–1961	OF
Joe Bush	1925	P
John Butler	1901	P
Kid Butler	1907	2B
John Buzhardt	1967	P
Freddie Bynum	2007–2008	OF
Harry Byrd	1955	P
Tim Byrdak	2004–2006	P
Tommy Byrne	1951–1952	P
Eric Byrnes	2005	OF
Milt Byrnes	1943–1945	OF
Enos Cabell	1972–1974	3B
César Cabral	2015	P
Daniel Cabrera	2004–2008	P
Everth Cabrera	2015	SS
Fernando Cabrera	2007–2008	P
Tom Cafego	1937	OF
Bob Cain	1952–1953	P
Sugar Cain	1935–1936	P
Earl Caldwell	1935–1937	P
Napoleón Calzado	2005	OF
Bruce Campbell	1932–1934	OF
Yennier Cano	2023–present	P
Paul Carey	1993	1B
Tom Carey	1935–1937	2B
Dylan Carlson	2025	OF
Héctor Carrasco	2003	P
Chico Carrasquel	1959	SS
Cam Carreon	1966	C
Cody Carroll	2018, 2020	P
Joe Carter	1998	OF
Raul Casanova	2002	C
Andrew Cashner	2018-2019	P
Carlos Casimiro	2000	DH
Alexi Casilla	2013–2014	2B
George Caster	1941–1945	P
Alberto Castillo	2007	C
Alberto Castillo	2008–2010	P
José Castillo	2025	P
Welington Castillo	2017	C
Foster Castleman	1958	3B
Bernie Castro	2005	2B
Juan Castro	2008	SS
Miguel Castro	2017–2020	P
Wayne Causey	1955–1957	SS
Art Ceccarelli	1957	P
Bob Chakales	1954	P
Harry Chapman	1916	C
Norm Charlton	1997–1998	P
Mike Chartak	1942–1944	OF
Endy Chávez	2012	OF
Raúl Chávez	2006	C
Bruce Chen	2004–2006	P
Wei-Yin Chen	2012–2015	P
Rocky Cherry	2007–2008	P
Tony Chévez	1977	P
Robinson Chirinos	2022	C
Tom Chism	1979	1B
Mark Christman	1939–1946	3B
Gino Cimoli	1964	OF
Alex Cintrón	2008	SS
Nick Ciuffo	2021	C
Al Clancy	1911	3B
Earl Clark	1934	OF
Howie Clark	2002, 2006	OF
Terry Clark	1995	P
Will Clark	1999–2000	1B
Zach Clark	2013	P
Nig Clarke	1911	C
Ellis Clary	1943–1945	3B
Bob Clemens	1914	OF
Pat Clements	1992	P
Verne Clemons	1916	C
Steve Clevenger	2013–2015	C
Harlond Clift	1934–1943	3B
Danny Clyburn	1997–1999	OF
Gil Coan	1954–1955	OF
Alex Cobb	2018–2020	P
Herb Cobb	1929	P
Ivanon Coffie	2000	3B
Dick Coffman	1928–1935	P
Slick Coffman	1940	P
Rich Coggins	1972–1974	OF
Ed Cole	1938–1939	P
Ed Coleman	1935–1936	OF
Joe Coleman	1954–1955	P
Ray Coleman	1947–1952	OF
Rip Coleman	1960	P
Pat Collins	1919–1924	C
Rip Collins	1929–1931	P
Pete Compton	1911–1913	OF
Jeff Conine	1999–2003, 2006	1B
Fritzie Connally	1985	3B
Joe Connor	1901	C
Wid Conroy	1901	3B
Sandy Consuegra	1956–1957	P
Roansy Contreras	2025	P
Mike Cook	1993	P
Rollin Cook	1915	P
Bob Cooney	1931–1932	P
Rocky Coppinger	1996–1999	P
Doug Corbett	1987	P
Archie Corbin	1996	P
Marty Cordova	2002–2003	OF
Mark Corey	1979–1981	OF
Lance Cormier	2008	P
Red Corriden	1910	SS
Jim Corsi	1999	P
Nestor Cortes Jr.	2018	P
Danny Coulombe	2023–2024	P
Clint Courtney	1952–1954, 1960–1961	C
Sam Covington	1913	1B
Colton Cowser	2023–Present	OF
Bill Cox	1938–1940	P
Billy Cox	1955	3B
Doc Crandall	1916	P
Jake Crawford	1952	OF
Stefan Crichton	2017	P
Lou Criger	1909	C
Dave Criscione	1977	C
Tony Criscola	1942–1943	OF
Joe Crisp	1910–1911	C
Dode Criss	1908–1911	P
Ned Crompton	1909	OF
Frank Crossin	1912–1914	C
Bill Crouch	1910	P
Jack Crouch	1930–1931, 1933	C
Alvin Crowder	1927–1930	P
Terry Crowley	1969–1973, 1976–1982	DH
Deivi Cruz	2003	SS
Nelson Cruz	2014	LF/DH
Todd Cruz	1983–1984	SS
Darwin Cubillán	2004	P
Mike Cuellar	1969–1976	P
Roy Cullenbine	1940–1942	OF
Nick Cullop	1921	P
Midre Cummings	2005	OF
Perry Currin	1947	SS
George Curry	1911	P
Jack Cust	2003–2004	DH
Omar Daal	2003	P
Angelo Dagres	1955	OF
Babe Dahlgren	1942, 1946	1B
John Daley	1912	SS
Bill Dalrymple	1915	3B
Clay Dalrymple	1969–1971	C
Dave Danforth	1922–1925	P
Ike Danning	1928	C
Rich Dauer	1976–1985	2B
Jerry DaVanon	1971	SS
Dave Davenport	1916–1919	P
Tucker Davidson	2024	P
Blake Davis	2011	2B
Chris Davis	2011-2020	1B/3B/RF
Butch Davis	1988–1989	OF
Dixie Davis	1920–1926	P
Eric Davis	1996–1998	OF
Glenn Davis	1991–1993	1B
Harry Davis	1937	1B
Storm Davis	1982–1986, 1992	P
Tommy Davis	1999	C
Tommy Davis	1972–1975	OF
Charlie Deal	1916	3B
**Dizzy Dean**	1947	P
Paul Dean	1943	P
Alejandro De Aza	2014–2015	OF
Joe DeBerry	1920–1921	P
Doug DeCinces	1973–1981	3B
Jim Dedrick	1995	P
Shorty Dee	1915	SS
Mike DeJean	2004	P
Francisco de la Rosa	1991	P
Jim Delahanty	1907	2B
Luis DeLeon	1987	P
David Dellucci	1997	OF
Ike Delock	1963	P
Jim Delsing	1950–1952	OF
Joe DeMaestri	1952	SS
Frank Demaree	1944	OF
Billy DeMars	1950–1951	SS
Ray Demmitt	1910, 1917–1919	OF
Gene DeMontreville	1904	2B
Rick Dempsey	1976–1986	C
Sam Dente	1948	SS
Delino DeShields	1999–2001	2B
John DeSilva	1995	P
Odrisamer Despaigne	2016	P
César Devarez	1995–1996	C
Mike Devereaux	1989–1994, 1996	OF
Walt Devoy	1909	OF
Yusniel Díaz	2022	OF
Chris Dickerson	2013	OF
Chuck Diering	1954–1956	OF
Gordon Dillard	1988	P
Bob Dillinger	1946–1949	3B
Bill Dillman	1967	P
Mike Dimmel	1977–1978	OF
Bill Dinneen	1907–1909	P
Marcos Diplán	2021–2022	P
Ken Dixon	1984–1987	P
Leo Dixon	1925–1927	C
Pat Dobson	1971–1972	P
Tom Dodd	1986	DH
Seranthony Domínguez	2024–2025	P
Jiggs Donahue	1901–1902	1B
Red Donahue	1902–1903	P
Len Dondero	1929	3B
Harry Dorish	1950, 1955–1956	P
Sean Douglass	2001–2003	P
Pete Dowling	1901	P
Jess Doyle	1931	P
Cory Doyne	2007	P
Doug Drabek	1998	P
Moe Drabowsky	1966–1968, 1970	P
Dick Drago	1977	P
Oliver Drake	2015–2017	P
Clem Dreisewerd	1948	P
Karl Drews	1948–1949	P
Travis Driskill	2002–2003	P
Walt Dropo	1959–1961	1B
Shawn Dubin	2025	P
Eric DuBose	2002–2006	P
Brian Duensing	2016	P
Hugh Duffy	1901	OF
Jim Duggan	1911	1B
Tom Dukes	1971	P
Dave Duncan	1975–1976	C
Ryne Duren	1954	P
Jim Dyck	1951-53, 1955-56	LF/3B
Ryan Eades	2019	P
Jake Early	1947	C
Carl East	1915	OF
Adam Eaton	2009	P
Hank Edwards	1953	OF
Mark Eichhorn	1994	P
Zach Eflin	2024–Present	P
George Elder	1949	OF
Frank Ellerbe	1921–1924	3B
Bob Elliott	1953	3B
Jumbo Elliott	1923	P
Chris Ellis	2021–2022	P
Verdo Elmore	1924	OF
Red Embree	1949	P
Dietrich Enns	2025–present	P
Jack Enzenroth	1914	C
Hal Epps	1943–1944	OF
Mike Epstein	1966–1967	1B
Scott Erickson	1995–2002	P
Tom Eshelman	2019–2021	P
José Espada	2025–present	P
Chuck Essegian	1961	OF
Bobby Estalella	1941	OF
Chuck Estrada	1960–1964	P
Oscar Estrada	1929	P
Andy Etchebarren	1962–1975	C
Dwight Evans	1991	OF
Joe Evans	1924–1925	OF
Roy Evans	1903	P
Dana Eveland	2012	P
Hoot Evers	1955–1956	OF
Luis Exposito	2012	C
Willie Eyre	2011	P
Homer Ezzell	1923	3B
Brandon Fahey	2006–2008	SS
Chet Falk	1925–1927	P
Brian Falkenborg	1999	P
Cliff Fannin	1945–1952	P
Ed Farmer	1977	P
Sal Fasano	2005	C
Stan Ferens	1942–1946	P
Scott Feldman	2013	P
Chico Fernández	1968	SS
Sid Fernandez	1994–1995	P
Don Ferrarese	1955–1957	P
Rick Ferrell	1929–1933, 1941–1943	C
Tom Ferrick	1946, 1949–1950	P
Hobe Ferris	1908–1909	2B
Mike Fetters	1999	P
Mike Figga	1999	C
Bill Fincher	1916	P
Tommy Fine	1950	P
Jim Finigan	1959	3B
Jeff Fiorentino	2005–2006, 2009	OF
Steve Finley	1989–1990	OF
Lou Finney	1945–1946	OF
Mike Fiore	1968	1B
Jeff Fiorentino	2005–2007, 2009–2010	OF
Carl Fischer	1932	P
Eddie Fisher	1966–1967	P
Jack Fisher	1959–1962	P
Red Fisher	1910	OF
Showboat Fisher	1932	OF
Tom Fisher	1967	P
Jay Flaa	2021	P
Jack Flaherty	2023	P
Ryan Flaherty	2012–2017	2B
Charlie Flannigan	1913	3B
Mike Flanagan	1975–1987, 1991–1992	P
John Flinn	1978–1979, 1982	P
Pedro Florimón	2011	SS
Bobby Floyd	1968–1970	SS
Hank Foiles	1961	C
P. J. Forbes	1998–1999	2B
Dan Ford	1982–1985	OF
Dave Ford	1978–1981	P
Lew Ford	2012	OF
Brook Fordyce	2000–2003	C
Mike Fornieles	1956–1957	P
Eddie Foster	1922–1923	3B
Kris Foster	2001	P
Howie Fox	1954	P
Jake Fox	2010–2011	C/1B
Maikel Franco	2021	3B
Tito Francona	1956–1957	OF
Adam Frazier	2023	2B/OF
Joe Frazier	1956	OF
Roger Freed	1970	OF
Ryan Freel	2009	IF
Alejandro Freire	2005	1B
Jim Fridley	1954	OF
Bill Friel	1901–1903	2B
Owen Friend	1949–1950	2B
John Frill	1912	P
Emil Frisk	1905–1907	OF
Todd Frohwirth	1991–1993	P
Paul Fry	2018–2022	P
Charlie Fuchs	1943	P
Shintaro Fujinami	2023	P
Jim Fuller	1973–1974	OF
Carson Fulmer	2020	P
Chris Fussell	1998	P
Armando Gabino	2010	P
Eddie Gaedel	1951	PH
Joe Gaines	1963–1964	OF
Denny Galehouse	1941–1947	P
Dave Gallagher	1990	OF
Joe Gallagher	1939–1940	OF
Yovani Gallardo	2016	P
Bert Gallia	1918–1920	P
Freddy Galvis	2021	SS
Chico García	1954	2B
Freddy García	2013	P
Jason Garcia	2015	P
Jesse Garcia	1999–2000	SS
Karim García	2000, 2004	OF
Kiko Garcia	1976–1980	SS
Luis García	2002	OF
Rico Garcia	2022, 2025–present	P
Billy Gardner	1956–1959	2B
Wayne Garland	1973–1976	P
Debs Garms	1932–1935	OF
Reed Garrett	2023	P
Ned Garver	1948–1952	P
Ned Garvin	1901	P
Tom Gastall	1955–1956	C
Milt Gaston	1925–1927	P
Kevin Gausman	2013–2018	P
Joe Gedeon	1918–1920	2B
Phil Geier	1901	OF
Jim Gentile	1960–1963	1B
Craig Gentry	2017-2018	OF
Lefty George	1911	P
Wally Gerber	1917–1928	SS
Ken Gerhart	1986–1988	OF
Al Gerheauser	1948	P
Lou Gertenrich	1901	OF
Joe Giard	1925–1926	P
Johnny Giavotella	2017	2B
Jay Gibbons	2001–2007	OF
Charlie Gibson	1905	C
Kyle Gibson	2023, 2025	P
Gerónimo Gil	2001–2005	C
Billy Gilbert	1901	2B
George Gill	1939	P
Logan Gillaspie	2022–2023	P
Paul Gilliford	1967	P
Jack Gilligan	1909–1910	P
Sean Gilmartin	2018-2019	P
Joe Ginsberg	1956–1960	C
Tony Giuliani	1936–1937	C
Mychal Givens	2015–2020, 2023	P
Fred Glade	1904–1907	P
Billy Gleason	1921	2B
Harry Gleason	1904–1905	3B
Joe Glenn	1939	C
Gordon Goldsberry	1952	1B
Mike Goliat	1951–1952	2B
Chris Gomez	2005–2007	SS
Leo Gómez	1990–1995	3B
Rene Gonzales	1987–1990	3B
Mike Gonzalez	2010–2011	P
Miguel González	2012–2015	P
Billy Goodman	1957	2B
Curtis Goodwin	1995	OF
Goose Goslin	1930–1932	OF
Claude Gouzzie	1903	2B
Joe Grace	1938–1946	OF
Fred Graf	1913	3B
Bert Graham	1910	1B
Dan Graham	1980–1981	C
Jack Graham	1949	1B
Bill Grahame	1908–1910	P
George Grant	1923–1925	P
Pete Gray	1945	OF
Sam Gray	1928–1933	P
Ted Gray	1955	P
Gene Green	1960	OF
Lenny Green	1957–1959, 1964	OF
Charlie Greene	1997–1998	C
Conner Greene	2021	P
Willie Greene	1998–1999	3B
Kevin Gregg	2011–2012	P
Howie Gregory	1911	P
Bobby Grich	1970–1976	2B
Mike Griffin	1987	P
Art Griggs	1909–1910	1B
Ed Grimes	1931–1932	3B
Jason Grimsley	2004–2005	P
Ross Grimsley	1974–1977, 1982	P
Bob Groom	1916–1917	P
Buddy Groom	2000–2004	P
Wayne Gross	1984–1985	3B
Johnny Groth	1953	OF
Frank Grube	1934–1935, 1941	C
Sig Gryska	1938–1939	SS
**Vladimir Guerrero**	2011	DH
Ozzie Guillén	1998	SS
Preston Guilmet	2014	P
Ted Gullic	1930–1933	OF
Glenn Gulliver	1982–1983	3B
Ernie Gust	1911	1B
Frankie Gustine	1950	2B
Jeremy Guthrie	2007–2011	P
Jackie Gutiérrez	1986–1987	SS
Kelvin Gutiérrez	2021–2022	3B
Don Gutteridge	1942–1945	2B
Juan Guzmán	1998–1999	P
Bob Habenicht	1953	P
John Habyan	1985–1988	P
Harvey Haddix	1964–1965	P
Bump Hadley	1932–1934	P
Tom Hafey	1944	3B
Hal Haid	1919	P
Jerry Hairston Jr.	1998–2004	2B
John Halama	2006	P
Bob Hale	1955–1959	1B
George Hale	1914–1918	C
Sammy Hale	1930	3B
Bill Hall	2012	OF
Dick Hall	1961–1966, 1969–1971	P
DL Hall	2022–2023	P
Marc Hall	1910	P
Ed Hallinan	1911–1912	SS
Bill Hallman	1901	OF
Earl Hamilton	1911–1917	P
Jason Hammel	2012–2013	P
Jeffrey Hammonds	1993–1998	OF
Bert Hamric	1958	?
Maverick Handley	2025-Present	C
Larry Haney	1966–1968	C
Eric Hanhold	2021	P
Loy Hanning	1939–1942	P
Ron Hansen	1958–1962	SS
Snipe Hansen	1935	P
Jim Hardin	1967–1971	P
J. J. Hardy	2011–2017	SS
Pinky Hargrave	1925–1926	C
Larry Harlow	1975–1979	OF
Pete Harnisch	1988–1991	P
Bill Harper	1911	P
Jack Harper	1902	P
Tommy Harper	1976	OF
Bob Harris	1939–1942	P
Gene Harris	1995	P
Willie Harris	2001	OF
Bob Harrison	1955–1956	P
Roric Harrison	1972	P
Earl Harrist	1952	P
Sam Harshany	1937–1940	C
Jack Harshman	1958–1959	P
Donnie Hart	2016–2018	P
Mike Hart	1987	OF
Grover Hartley	1916–1917, 1934	C
Mike Hartley	1995	P
Paul Hartzell	1980	P
Roy Hartzell	1906–1910	OF
Hunter Harvey	2019–2021	P
Matt Harvey	2021	P
Joe Hassler	1930	SS
Grady Hatton	1956	3B
Brad Havens	1985–1986	P
Ed Hawk	1911	P
LaTroy Hawkins	2006	P
Pink Hawley	1901	P
Frankie Hayes	1942–1943	C
Jimmy Haynes	1995–1997	P
Austin Hays	2017, 2019–2024	OF
Ray Hayworth	1942, 1944–1945	C
Drungo Hazewood	1980	OF
Louis Head	2022	P
Jehosie Heard	1954	P
Jonathan Heasley	2024	P
Jeff Heath	1946–1947	OF
Tommy Heath	1935–1938	C
Wally Hebert	1931–1933	P
Don Heffner	1938–1943	2B
Emmet Heidrick	1902–1908	OF
Mel Held	1956	P
Woodie Held	1966–1967	SS
Hank Helf	1946	C
Jeremy Hellickson	2017	P
Rick Helling	2003	P
Ryan Helsley	2026-Present	P
Ed Hemingway	1914	2B
Charlie Hemphill	1902–1907	OF
Rollie Hemsley	1933–1937	C
Gunnar Henderson	2022–Present	SS
Ellie Hendricks	1968–1976, 1978–1979	C
Mark Hendrickson	2009–2011	P
Tim Hendryx	1918	OF
Sean Henn	2009	P
George Hennessey	1937	P
Dutch Henry	1921–1922	P
Pat Hentgen	2001–2003	P
David Hernandez	2009–2010	P
Leo Hernández	1982–1985	3B
Luis Hernández	2007–2008	SS
Ramón Hernández	2006–2008	C
Bobby Herrera	1951	P
Dilson Herrera	2020	2B
**Whitey Herzog**	1961–1962	OF
David Hess	2018–2020	P
Johnny Hetki	1952	P
Johnnie Heving	1920	C
Kevin Hickey	1989–1991	P
Aaron Hicks	2023	OF
Oral Hildebrand	1937–1938	P
Rich Hill	2009	P
Hunter Hill	1903–1904	3B
Yaramil Hiraldo	2025-Present	P
Billy Hitchcock	1947	3B
Myril Hoag	1939–1941	OF
Harry Hoch	1914–1915	P
Billy Hoeft	1959–1962	P
L. J. Hoes	2012–2013	OF
Jim Hoey	2006–2007	P
Chet Hoff	1915	P
Danny Hoffman	1908–1911	OF
Willie Hogan	1911–1912	OF
George Hogreiver	1901	OF
Elon Hogsett	1936–1937	P
Bobby Hogue	1951–1952	P
Chris Hoiles	1989–1999	C
Bryan Holaday	2020	C
Jackson Holliday	2024–Present	2B
Ken Holcombe	1952	P
Fred Holdsworth	1976–1977	P
Al Hollingsworth	1942–1946	P
Bobo Holloman	1953	P
Darren Holmes	2000	P
Herm Holshouser	1930	P
Brian Holton	1989–1990	P
Ken Holtzman	1976	P
Don Hood	1973–1974	P
Paul Hopkins	1929	P
Sam Horn	1990–1992	DH
Rogers Hornsby	1933–1937	2B
Byron Houck	1918	P
J. R. House	2007	C
Art Houtteman	1957	P
Bruce Howard	1968	P
Ivan Howard	1914–1915	1B
Harry Howell	1904–1910	P
Trenidad Hubbard	2000	OF
Ken Huckaby	2004	C
Rex Hudler	1986	2B
Willis Hudlin	1940, 1944	P
Hal Hudson	1952	P
Kyle Hudson	2011	OF
Frank Huelsman	1904	OF
Aubrey Huff	2007–2009	1B/3B
Ben Huffman	1937	C
Phil Huffman	1985	P
Keith Hughes	1988	OF
Rhyne Hughes	2010	1B
Roy Hughes	1938–1939	2B
Mark Huismann	1989	P
Tim Hulett	1989–1994	3B
Cooper Hummel	2025	UT
Nick Hundley	2014	C
Bernie Hungling	1930	C
Billy Hunter	1953–1954	SS
Tommy Hunter	2011–2015, 2016	P
Dave Huppert	1983	C
Jeff Huson	1994–1996	SS
Bert Husting	1901	P
Jim Hutto	1975	OF
Dick Hyde	1961	P
Pat Hynes	1904	OF
José Iglesias	2020	SS
Travis Ishikawa	2013	1B
Pete Incaviglia	1996–1997	OF
Hooks Iott	1941, 1947	P
Cole Irvin	2023–2024	P
César Izturis	2009–2011	SS
Alex Jackson	2025	C
Drew Jackson	2019	OF
Edwin Jackson	2017	P
Grant Jackson	1971–1976	P
Jeremiah Jackson	2025–present	2B
Lou Jackson	1964	OF
**Reggie Jackson**	1976	OF
Ron Jackson	1984	1B
Baby Doll Jacobson	1915–1926	OF
Beany Jacobson	1906–1907	P
Chris Jakubauskas	2011	P
Sig Jakucki	1936–1945	P
Bill James	1914–1915	P
Paul Janish	2015–2017	3B
Mickey Jannis	2021	P
Ray Jansen	1910	3B
Heinie Jantzen	1912	OF
Jesse Jefferson	1973–1975	P
Stan Jefferson	1989–1990	OF
Joe Jenkins	1914	C
Tom Jenkins	1929–1932	OF
Bill Jennings	1951	SS
Eloy Jiménez	2024	OF/DH
Ubaldo Jiménez	2014–2017	P
Doug Johns	1998–2000	P
Pete Johns	1918	3B
Bob Johnson	1963–1967	SS
Charles Johnson	1999–2000	C
Chet Johnson	1946	P
Connie Johnson	1956–1958	P
Dan Johnson	2013	1B
Daniel Johnson	2024–2025	OF
Darrell Johnson	1952, 1962	C
Dave Johnson	1974–1975	P
Dave Johnson	1989–1991	P
Davey Johnson	1965–1972	2B
Don Johnson	1950–1951, 1955	P
Ernie Johnson	1916–1918	SS
Ernie Johnson	1959	P
Fred Johnson	1938–1939	P
Jason Johnson	1999–2003	P
Jim Johnson	2006–2013	P
Kelly Johnson	2014	UT
Mike Johnson	1997	P
Nick Johnson	2012	DH/1B
Steve Johnson	2012–2013, 2015	P
Johnny Johnston	1913	OF
Adam Jones	2008–2018	OF
Charlie Jones	1908	OF
Davy Jones	1901–1902	OF
Doug Jones	1995	P
Earl Jones	1945	P
Gordon Jones	1960–1961	P
Jahmai Jones	2021	2B/OF
Odell Jones	1986	P
Ricky Jones	1986	2B
Sam Jones	1927	P
Sam Jones	1964	P
Stacy Jones	1991	P
Tom Jones	1904–1909	1B
Claude Jonnard	1926	P
Tom Jordan	1948	C
Caleb Joseph	2014–2018	C
Corban Joseph	2018	2B
Walt Judnich	1940–1947	OF
Jorge Julio	2001–2005	P
Jair Jurrjens	2013	P
Mike Kahoe	1902–1904	C
Scott Kamieniecki	1997–1999	P
Harry Kane	1902	P
Nate Karns	2019	P
Dick Kauffman	1914–1915	1B
**George Kell**	1956–1957	3B
Frank Kellert	1953–1954	1B
Pat Kelly	1977–1980	OF
Tony Kemp	2024	2B/OF
Bill Kennedy	1948–1951	P
Bob Kennedy	1954–1955	OF
Ray Kennedy	1916	?
Terry Kennedy	1987–1988	C
Vern Kennedy	1939–1941	P
Bill Kenworthy	1917	2B
Joe Kerrigan	1978–1980	P
Phil Ketter	1912	C
Jimmy Key	1997–1998	P
Paul Kilgus	1991	P
Bill Killefer	1909–1910	C
Hyun-soo Kim	2016-2017	OF
Harry Kimberlin	1936–1939	P
Craig Kimbrel	2024	P
Chad Kimsey	1929–1932	P
Ellis Kinder	1946–1947	P
Gene Kingsale	1996, 1998–2001	OF
Mike Kinkade	2000–2001	OF
Mike Kinnunen	1986–1987	P
Ed Kinsella	1910	P
Willie Kirkland	1964	OF
Ron Kittle	1990	OF
Andrew Kittredge	2025–present	P
Heston Kjerstad	2023–Present	OF
Billy Klaus	1959–1960	SS
Branden Kline	2019–2020	P
Steve Kline	2005	P
Scott Klingenbeck	1994–1995	P
Nap Kloza	1931–1932	OF
Clyde Kluttz	1951	C
Bill Knickerbocker	1937	SS
Dusten Knight	2021	P
Ray Knight	1987	3B
Jack Knott	1933–1938	P
Jon Knott	2007	OF
Darold Knowles	1965	P
Ben Koehler	1905–1906	OF
Ryan Kohlmeier	2000–2001	P
Dick Kokos	1948–1954	OF
Mark Kolozsvary	2023	C
Ray Kolp	1921–1924	P
Brad Komminsk	1990	OF
Ernie Koob	1915–1919	P
Dave Koslo	1954	P
Lou Koupal	1937	P
Jack Kramer	1939–1947	P
Mike Kreevich	1943–1945	OF
Joey Krehbiel	2021–2023	P
Dean Kremer	2020–present	P
Wayne Krenchicki	1979–1981	3B
Red Kress	1927–1932, 1938–1939	SS
Lou Kretlow	1950, 1953–1955	P
Paul Krichell	1911–1912	C
Brooks Kriske	2021	P
Rick Krivda	1995–1997, 2000	P
Matt Krook	2024	P
Dick Kryhoski	1952–1954	1B
Ed Kusel	1909	P
Joe Kutina	1911–1912	1B
Bob Kuzava	1954–1955	P
Chet Laabs	1939–1946	OF
Lee Lacy	1985–1987	OF
Joe Lake	1910–1912	P
Junior Lake	2015	OF
Tim Laker	1997	C
Travis Lakins	2020–2022	P
Al LaMacchia	1943–1946	P
Lyman Lamb	1920–1921	3B
Chris Lambert	2009	P
Bobby LaMotte	1925–1926	SS
Hobie Landrith	1962–1963	C
Tito Landrum	1983, 1988	OF
Max Lanier	1953	P
Frank LaPorte	1911–1912	2B
Don Larsen	1953–1954, 1965	P
Lyn Lary	1935–1936, 1940	SS
Bill Lasley	1924	P
Charley Lau	1961–1967	C
Ramón Laureano	2025	OF
Doc Lavan	1913–1917	SS
Ryan Lavarnway	2015	C
Roxie Lawson	1939–1940	P
Pete Layden	1948	OF
Tom Leahy	1901	C
John Leary	1914–1915	1B
Wade LeBlanc	2020–2021	P
Aaron Ledesma	1997	SS
Billy Lee	1915–1916	OF
Derrek Lee	2011	1B
Dud Lee	1920–1921	SS
Mark Lee	1995	P
Craig Lefferts	1992	P
Jim Lehew	1961–1962	P
Ken Lehman	1957–1958	P
Paul Lehner	1946–1949, 1951	OF
Jon Leicester	2007	P
Lefty Leifield	1918–1920	P
Don Lenhardt	1950–1954	OF
José León	2002–2004	1B
Mark Leonard	1993	OF
Dave Leonhard	1967–1972	P
Don Leppert	1955	2B
Josh Lester	2023	1B
Walt Leverenz	1913–1915	P
Hod Leverette	1920	P
Jim Levey	1930–1933	SS
Mark Lewis	2000	2B
Richie Lewis	1992, 1998	P
Domingo Leyba	2021	2B
Glenn Liebhardt	1936–1938	P
Kerry Ligtenberg	2003	P
Matt Lindstrom	2012	P
Fred Link	1910	P
Ed Linke	1938	P
Doug Linton	1998–1999	P
Johnny Lipon	1953	SS
Nig Lipscomb	1937	2B
Dick Littlefield	1952–1954	P
Radhames Liz	2007–2009	P
Chuck Locke	1955	P
Whitey Lockman	1959	1B
Billy Loes	1956–1959	P
Adam Loewen	2006–2008	P
Peter Lohman	1984–1985	P
Sherm Lollar	1949–1951	C
Steve Lombardozzi Jr.	2014	2B
Dale Long	1951	1B
Ed Lopat	1955	P
Carlos Lopez	1978	OF
Javy López	2004–2006	C
Jorge López	2020–2023	P
Luis López	2002, 2004	SS
Marcelino López	1967, 1969–1970	P
Rodrigo López	2002–2006	P
David Lough	2014–2015	OF
Grover Lowdermilk	1915, 1917–1919	P
John Lowenstein	1979–1985	OF
Zac Lowther	2021–2022	P
Johnny Lucadello	1938–1946	2B
Josh Lucas	2019	P
Steve Luebber	1981	P
Dick Luebke	1962	P
Julio Lugo	2010	SS
Fernando Lunar	2000–2002	C
Don Lund	1948	OF
Joe Lutz	1951	1B
Jordan Lyles	2022	P
Adrian Lynch	1920	P
Fred Lynn	1985–1988	OF
George Lyons	1924	P
Bob Mabe	1960	P
Manny Machado	2012–2018	3B
Robert Machado	2003–2004	C
Vimael Machín	2025	3B
Elliott Maddox	1977	OF
Dave Madison	1952	P
Calvin Maduro	2000–2002	P
Lee Magee	1917	OF
Jack Maguire	1951	OF
Roy Mahaffey	1936	P
Bob Mahoney	1951–1952	P
Joe Mahoney	2012	1B
John Maine	2004–2005	P
Fritz Maisel	1918	3B
George Maisel	1913	OF
Hank Majeski	1955	3B
Val Majewski	2004	OF
Alex Malloy	1910	P
Bob Malloy	1949	P
Billy Maloney	1901–1902	OF
Trey Mancini	2016–2019	1B/OF
Frank Mancuso	1944–1946	C
Clyde Manion	1928–1930	C
Ernie Manning	1914	P
Julio Mañón	2006	P
Jeff Manto	1995	3B
Heinie Manush	1928–1930	OF
Rolla Mapel	1919	P
Cliff Mapes	1951	OF
Johnny Marcum	1939	P
Jhan Mariñez	2018	P
Marty Marion	1952–1953	SS
Nick Markakis	2006–2014	OF
Duke Markell	1951	P
Roger Marquis	1955	OF
Eli Marrero	2005	C
Armando Marsans	1916–1917	OF
Fred Marsh	1951–1952, 1955–1956	3B
Cuddles Marshall	1950	P
Jim Marshall	1958	1B
Babe Martin	1944–1946, 1953	OF
Corbin Martin	2025	P
Joe Martin	1903	OF
Morrie Martin	1956	P
Richie Martin	2019	SS
Speed Martin	1917	P
Chito Martínez	1991–1993	OF
Dennis Martínez	1976–1986	P
Tippy Martinez	1976–1986	P
Frank Mata	2010	P
Tom Matchick	1972	SS
Jorge Mateo	2021–2025	2B
Terry Mathews	1996–1998	P
Nick Maton	2024	UT
Luis Matos	2000–2006	OF
Gary Matthews Jr.	2002–2003	OF
Isaac Mattson	2021	P
Brian Matusz	2009–2016	P
Charlie Maxwell	1955	OF
Dave May	1967–1970	OF
Derrick May	1999–2000	OF
Lee May	1975–1980	1B
Rudy May	1976–1977	P
Wally Mayer	1919	C
Coby Mayo	2024–Present	3B
Mel Mazzera	1935–1939	OF
Bill McAfee	1934	P
Jimmy McAleer	1902–1907	OF
Jack McAleese	1909	OF
Bill McAllester	1913	C
George McBride	1901	SS
Tim McCabe	1915–1918	P
James McCann	2023–2024	C
Jerry McCarthy	1948	1B
Barry McCormick	1902–1903	3B
Mike McCormick	1963–1964	P
Bill McCorry	1909	P
Bob McCrory	2008–2009	P
Chayce McDermott	2024–Present	P
Ben McDonald	1989–1995	P
Darnell McDonald	2004	OF
Hank McDonald	1933	P
Jim McDonald	1951, 1955	P
Joe McDonald	1910	3B
Roger McDowell	1996	P
Chuck McElroy	2000–2001	P
T. J. McFarland	2013–2016	P
Kevin McGehee	1993	P
Bill McGill	1907	P
Beauty McGowan	1928–1929	OF
Scott McGregor	1976–1988	P
Mickey McGuire	1962–1967	SS
Ryan McGuire	2002	1B
Archie McKain	1941–1943	P
Reeve McKay	1915	P
Ryan McKenna	2021–2024	OF
Jeff McKnight	1990–1991	1B
Jim McLaughlin	1932	3B
Mark McLemore	1992–1994	2B
Nate McLouth	2012–2013	OF
Marty McManus	1920–1926	2B
Norm McMillan	1924	3B
Dave McNally	1962–1974	P
Earl McNeely	1928–1931	OF
Glenn McQuillen	1938–1947	OF
George McQuinn	1938–1945	1B
John Means	2018–2024	P
Irv Medlinger	1949–1951	P
Tommy Mee	1910	SS
Evan Meek	2014	P
Heinie Meine	1922	P
Walt Meinert	1913	OF
Ryan Meisinger	2018	P
Sam Mele	1954	OF
Francisco Meléndez	1989	1B
Ski Melillo	1926–1935	2B
Paul Meloan	1911	OF
Bob Melvin	1989–1991	C
Carlos Méndez	2003	1B
Mike Meola	1936	P
José Mercedes	2000–2001	P
Luis Mercedes	1991–1993	OF
Kent Mercker	1996	P
Cla Meredith	2009–2010	P
José Mesa	1987, 1990–1992	P
Bobby Messenger	1914	OF
Alex Metzler	1930	OF
Cass Michaels	1952	2B
Ed Mickelson	1953	1B
Kam Mickolio	2008–2010	P
Eddie Miksis	1957–1958	2B
Bob Milacki	1988–1992	P
Mike Milchin	1996	P
Wade Miley	2016–2017	P
Kevin Millar	2006–2008	1B/DH
Andrew Miller	2014	P
Bill Miller	1937	P
Bill Miller	1955	P
Bing Miller	1926–1927	OF
Charlie Miller	1912	SS
Dyar Miller	1975–1977	P
Ed Miller	1912–1914	1B
Jim Miller	2008	P
John Miller	1962–1967	P
Otto Miller	1927	3B
Ox Miller	1943, 1945–1946	P
Randy Miller	1977	P
Stu Miller	1963–1967	P
Ward Miller	1916–1917	OF
Randy Milligan	1989–1992	1B
Alan Mills	1992–1998, 2000–2001	P
Buster Mills	1938	OF
Lefty Mills	1934–1940	P
Kevin Millwood	2010	P
Al Milnar	1943, 1946	P
Tommy Milone	2020	P
Ryan Minor	1998–2000	3B
Ariel Miranda	2016	P
Willy Miranda	1952–1953, 1955–1959	SS
John Mitchell	1990	P
Paul Mitchell	1975	P
Roy Mitchell	1910–1914	P
Bill Mizeur	1923–1924	?
Chad Moeller	2009	C
Ron Moeller	1956–1958	P
George Mogridge	1925	P
Gabe Molina	1999–2000	P
Gustavo Molina	2007	C
Izzy Molina	2002	C
Bob Molinaro	1979	OF
Vince Molyneaux	1917	P
Lou Montañez	2008–2010	OF
Gene Moore	1944–1945	OF
Ray Moore	1955–1957	P
Scott Moore	2007–2008, 2010	2B
Scrappy Moore	1917	3B
Andrés Mora	1976–1978	OF
Melvin Mora	2000–2009	3B
José Morales	1981–1982	DH
Willie Morales	2000	C
Charles Moran	1904–1905	SS
José Morban	2003	SS
Keith Moreland	1989	OF
Víctor Moreno	2007	P
Cy Morgan	1903–1905, 1907	P
Mike Morgan	1988	P
Mike Moriarty	2002	SS
Dan Morogiello	1983	P
Bugs Morris	1918, 1921	P
John Morris	1968	P
Michael Morse	2013	OF
Charlie Morton	2025	P
Walter Moser	1911	P
Damian Moss	2003	P
Les Moss	1946–1955	C
Chad Mottola	2004	OF
Curt Motton	1967–1971, 1973–1974	OF
Glen Moulder	1947	P
Allie Moulton	1911	2B
Ryan Mountcastle	2020–present	OF
Lyle Mouton	1998	OF
Jamie Moyer	1992–1995	P
Heinie Mueller	1935	OF
Billy Mullen	1920–1921, 1928	3B
Cedric Mullins	2018–2025	OF
Bob Muncrief	1937–1947	P
Bobby Muñoz	1998	P
Ed Murray	1917	SS
**Eddie Murray**	1977–1988, 1996	1B
Jim Murray	1911	OF
Ray Murray	1954	C
Tony Muser	1975–1977	1B
**Mike Mussina**	1991–2000	P
Greg Myers	2000–2001	C
Hap Myers	1911	1B
Jimmy Myers	1996	P
Randy Myers	1996–1997	P
Buddy Napier	1912	P
Al Naples	1949	SS
Buster Narum	1963	P
Rey Navarro	2015	2B
Yamaico Navarro	2013	2B
Bob Neighbors	1939	SS
Red Nelson	1910–1912	P
Roger Nelson	1968	P
Tex Nelson	1955–1957	OF
Otto Neu	1917	SS
Ernie Nevers	1926–1928	P
Tyler Nevin	2021–2022	3B
David Newhan	2004–2006	OF
Maury Newlin	1940–1941	P
Patrick Newnam	1910–1911	1B
Bobo Newsom	1934–1935, 1938–1939, 1943	P
Carl Nichols	1986–1988	C
Dave Nicholson	1960–1962	OF
Tom Niedenfuer	1987–1988	P
Bob Nieman	1951–1952, 1956–1959	OF
Johnny Niggeling	1940–1943	P
Harry Niles	1906–1907	OF
Vinny Nittoli	2024	P
Ramón Nivar	2005	OF
Donell Nixon	1990	OF
Ryan Noda	2025	1B
Matt Nokes	1995	C
Joe Nolan	1982–1985	C
Dickie Noles	1988	P
Connor Norby	2024	2B
Tim Nordbrook	1974–1976	SS
Lou Nordyke	1906	1B
Bud Norris	2013–2015	P
Hub Northen	1910	OF
Jim Northrup	1974–1975	OF
Les Nunamaker	1918	C
Renato Núñez	2018–2020	3B
Vidal Nuño	2017	P
George O'Brien	1915	C
Pete O'Brien	1906	2B
Jack O'Connor	1987	P
Jack O'Connor	1904–1910	C
Darren O'Day	2012–2018	P
Billy O'Dell	1954–1959	P
John O'Donoghue	1968	P
John O'Donoghue	1993	P
Ryan O'Hearn	2023–2025	1B
Charley O'Leary	1934	SS
Tom O'Malley	1985–1986	3B
Steve O'Neill	1927–1928	C
Tyler O'Neill	2025–present	OF
Frank O'Rourke	1927–1931	3B
Johnny Oates	1970–1972	C
Sherman Obando	1993, 1995–1996	OF
Rougned Odor	2022	2B
Chuck Oertel	1958	OF
Jack Ogden	1928–1929	P
Will Ohman	2010	P
Bob Oliver	1974	1B
Garrett Olson	2007–2008	P
Gregg Olson	1988–1993	P
Logan Ondrusek	2016	P
Mike Oquist	1993–1995	P
Jesse Orosco	1995–1999	P
John Orsino	1963–1965	C
Joe Orsulak	1988–1992	OF
Joey Ortiz	2023	SS
Luis Ortiz	2018-2019	P
Russ Ortiz	2006	P
Keith Osik	2004	C
Fritz Ostermueller	1941–1943	P
Joe Ostrowski	1948–1950	P
Willis Otáñez	1998–1999	3B
Ricky Otero	1999	OF
Stubby Overmire	1950–1952	P
Chris Owings	2022	UT
John Pacella	1984	P
Cristian Pache	2024	OF
Frankie Pack	1949	?
Dick Padden	1902–1905	2B
Dave Pagan	1976	P
Mike Pagliarulo	1993	3B
Satchel Paige	1951–1953	P
Erv Palica	1955–1956	P
Rafael Palmeiro	1994–1998, 2004–2005	1B
**Jim Palmer**	1965–1984	P
Emilio Palmero	1921	P
John Papa	1961–1962	P
Al Papai	1949	P
Milt Pappas	1957–1965	P
Gerardo Parra	2015	OF
Al Pardo	1985–1986	C
Jimmy Paredes	2014–2015	UT
Mark Parent	1992–1993, 1996	C
Kelly Paris	1985–1986	3B
Jim Park	1915–1917	P
Pat Parker	1915	OF
Chris Parmelee	2015	1B
Chad Paronto	2001	P
John Parrish	2000–2001, 2003–2007	P
Mike Parrott	1977	P
Roy Partee	1948	C
Corey Patterson	2006–2007, 2010	OF
Ham Patterson	1909	1B
Tom Patton	1957	C
Troy Patton	2010–2014	P
Gene Paulette	1916–1917	1B
Ronny Paulino	2012	C
Jay Payton	2007–2008	OF
Steve Pearce	2012, 2013–2015, 2016	OF
Albie Pearson	1959–1960	OF
Eddie Pellagrini	1948–1949	SS
Barney Pelty	1903–1912	P
Francisco Peña	2016–2017	C
Orlando Peña	1971–1973	P
Hayden Penn	2005–2006	P
Brad Pennington	1993–1995	P
Kewpie Pennington	1917	P
Ray Pepper	1934–1936	OF
Oswaldo Peraza	1988	P
Cionel Pérez	2022–2025	P
Yorkis Pérez	2002	P
Scott Perry	1915	P
Parson Perryman	1915	P
Rusty Peters	1947	2B
Buddy Peterson	1957	SS
Jace Peterson	2018-2019	OF
Sid Peterson	1943	P
Jeff Pfeffer	1911	P
Cord Phelps	2014	2B
Dave Philley	1955–1956, 1960–1961	OF
Brett Phillips	2022	OF
Evan Phillips	2018–2020	P
Tom Phillips	1915	P
Zach Phillips	2011–2012	P
Tom Phoebus	1966–1970	P
Calvin Pickering	1998–1999	DH
Ollie Pickering	1907	OF
Félix Pie	2009–2011	OF
Al Pilarcik	1957–1960	OF
Duane Pillette	1950–1955	P
Lou Piniella	1964	OF
Jim Pisoni	1953	OF
Eddie Plank	1916–1917	P
Whitey Platt	1948–1949	OF
Adam Plutko	2021	P
Lou Polli	1932	P
Stuart Pomeranz	2012	P
Luis Polonia	1996	OF
Sidney Ponson	1998–2005	P
Jim Poole	1991–1994	P
Dave Pope	1955–1956	OF
Jay Porter	1952	C
Arnie Portocarrero	1958–1960	P
Bob Poser	1935	P
Cody Poteet	2025	P
Nels Potter	1943–1948	P
Cade Povich	2024–Present	P
Boog Powell	1961–1974	1B
Jack Powell	1902–1903, 1905–1912	P
Jack Powell	1913	P
John Powers	1960	OF
Carl Powis	1957	OF
Del Pratt	1912–1917	2B
Joe Price	1990	P
Jerry Priddy	1948–1949	2B
Jason Pridie	2013	OF
Earl Pruess	1920	OF
Hub Pruett	1922–1924	P
George Puccinelli	1934	OF
Jim Pyburn	1955–1957	OF
Ewald Pyle	1939–1942	P
Art Quirk	1962	P
Omar Quintanilla	2012	2B
Jamie Quirk	1989	C
Guillermo Quiróz	2008	C
Rip Radcliff	1940–1941	OF
Carson Ragsdale	2025	P
**Tim Raines**	2001	OF
Tim Raines Jr.	2001, 2003–2004	OF
Aaron Rakers	2004–2005	P
Allan Ramirez	1983	P
Ramón Ramírez	2014	P
Yefry Ramírez	2018-2019	P
Yohan Ramírez	2024	P
Ribs Raney	1949–1950	P
Clay Rapada	2011	P
Earl Rapp	1951–1952	OF
Pat Rapp	2000	P
Colby Rasmus	2018	OF
Chris Ray	2005–2007, 2009	P
Farmer Ray	1910	P
Floyd Rayford	1980–1982, 1984–1987	3B
Jeff Reboulet	1997–1999	2B
Tike Redman	2007	OF
Jake Reed	2022	P
Keith Reed	2005	OF
Steve Reed	2005	P
Tony Rego	1924–1925	C
Bill Reidy	1901–1903	P
Nolan Reimold	2009–2013, 2015–2016	OF
Mike Reinbach	1974	DH
Alex Remneas	1915	P
Merv Rettenmund	1968–1973	OF
Al Reyes	1999–2000	P
Denyi Reyes	2022	P
Jo-Jo Reyes	2011	P
Bob Reynolds	1972–1975	P
Carl Reynolds	1933	OF
Harold Reynolds	1993	2B
Mark Reynolds	2011–2012	1B/3B
Arthur Rhodes	1991–1999	P
Del Rice	1960	C
Harry Rice	1923–1927	OF
Chris Richard	2000–2002	OF
Tom Richardson	1917	?
Pete Richert	1967–1971	P
Ray Richmond	1920–1921	P
Joey Rickard	2016-2019	OF
Branch Rickey	1905–1906, 1914	C
Jim Riley	1921	2B
Matt Riley	1999, 2003–2004	P
Jeff Rineer	1979	P
Billy Ripken	1987–1992, 1996	2B
**Cal Ripken**	1981–2001	SS
Emmanuel Rivera	2024–2025	3B
Jim Rivera	1952	OF
Luis Rivera	2000	P
Sendy Rleal	2006	P
Brian Roberts	2001–2013	2B
**Robin Roberts**	1962–1965	P
Willis Roberts	2001–2003	P
Charlie Robertson	1926	P
Gene Robertson	1919–1926	3B
**Brooks Robinson**	1955–1977	3B
Earl Robinson	1961–1964	OF
Eddie Robinson	1957	1B
**Frank Robinson**	1966–1971	OF
Jeff Robinson	1991	P
Sergio Robles	1972–1973	C
Ike Rockenfield	1905–1906	2B
Aurelio Rodríguez	1983	3B
Eddy Rodríguez	2004, 2006	P
Elvin Rodríguez	2025	P
Francisco Rodríguez	2013	P
Grayson Rodriguez	2023–2024	P
Guillermo Rodríguez	2009	C
Nerio Rodríguez	1996–1998	P
Richard Rodríguez	2017	P
Vic Rodriguez	1984	2B
Chaz Roe	2015–2016	P
Gary Roenicke	1978–1985	OF
Ed Roetz	1929	SS
Ed Rogers	2002, 2005–2006	SS
Josh Rogers	2018-2019	P
Tom Rogers	1917–1919	P
Trevor Rogers	2024–present	P
Saul Rogovin	1955	P
Stan Rojek	1952	SS
J. C. Romero	2012	P
Jorge Rondón	2015	P
José Rondón	2019	SS
Charlie Root	1923	P
Mel Rosario	1997	C
Chuck Rose	1909	P
Claude Rossman	1909	1B
Frank Roth	1905	C
Dave Rowan	1911	1B
Wade Rowdon	1988	3B
Ken Rowe	1964–1965	P
Willie Royster	1981	C
Vic Roznovsky	1966–1967	C
Ken Rudolph	1977	C
Muddy Ruel	1915, 1933	C
Rio Ruiz	2019–2021	3B
William Rumler	1914–1917	C
Josh Rupe	2011	P
Adley Rutschman	2022–Present	C
B. J. Ryan	1999–2005	P
Chris Sabo	1994	3B
Brian Sackinsky	1996	P
Lenn Sakata	1980–1985	2B
Oscar Salazar	2008–2009	IF
Chico Salmon	1969–1972	2B
Gary Sánchez	2025	C
Orlando Sánchez	1984	C
Dee Sanders	1945	P
Roy Sanders	1920	P
Fred Sanford	1943–1948, 1951	P
Anthony Santander	2017–2024	OF
Omir Santos	2008	C
Víctor Santos	2007	P
Luis Sardiñas	2018	2B
Dennis Sarfate	2008–2009	P
Frank Saucier	1951	OF
Joe Saunders	2012, 2014	P
Bob Savage	1949	P
Bob Saverine	1959–1964	2B
Ollie Sax	1928	3B
Steve Scarsone	1992	2B
Mac Sceroler	2021	P
Sid Schacht	1950–1951	P
Art Schallock	1955	P
Wally Schang	1926–1929	C
Art Scharein	1932–1934	3B
John Scheneberg	1920	P
Joe Schepner	1919	3B
Bill Scherrer	1988	P
Curt Schilling	1988–1991	P
Dutch Schirick	1914	?
Dutch Schliebner	1923	1B
Ray Schmandt	1915	1B
George Schmees	1952	OF
Dave Schmidt	1987–1989	P
Pete Schmidt	1913	P
Johnny Schmitz	1956	P
Hank Schmulbach	1943	?
Jeff Schneider	1981	P
Jonathan Schoop	2013–2018	2B
Rick Schu	1988–1989	3B
Fred Schulte	1927–1932	OF
Johnny Schulte	1923, 1932	C
Len Schulte	1944–1946	3B
Joe Schultz	1943–1948	C
Ralph Schwamb	1948	P
Al Schweitzer	1908–1911	OF
Hal Schwenk	1913	P
Luke Scott	2008–2011	OF
Mickey Scott	1972–1973	P
Tanner Scott	2017–2021	P
Tayler Scott	2019	P
Ken Sears	1946	C
Cody Sedlock	2022	P
Kal Segrist	1955	2B
David Segui	1990–1993, 2001–2004	1B
Colin Selby	2024–present	P
Hank Severeid	1915–1925	C
Pedro Severino	2019–2021	C
Al Severinsen	1969	P
Luke Sewell	1942	C
Doc Shanley	1912	SS
Owen Shannon	1903	C
Merv Shea	1933	C
Larry Sheets	1984–1989	DH
John Shelby	1981–1987	OF
Chandler Shepherd	2019	P
Keith Shepherd	1996	P
George Sherrill	2008–2009	P
Barry Shetrone	1959–1962	OF
Charlie Shields	1902	P
Tommy Shields	1992	2B
Tex Shirley	1944–1946	P
Urban Shocker	1918–1924	P
Tom Shopay	1971–1977	OF
Ray Shore	1946–1949	P
Bill Short	1962, 1966	P
Chick Shorten	1922	OF
Burt Shotton	1909–1917	OF
John Shovlin	1919–1920	2B
Paul Shuey	2007	P
Norm Siebern	1964–1965	1B
Ed Siever	1903–1904	P
Roy Sievers	1949–1953	1B
Eddie Silber	1937–1939	OF
Nelson Simmons	1987	OF
Alfredo Simón	2008–2011	P
Syl Simon	1923–1924	3B
Pete Sims	1915	P
Chris Singleton	2002	OF
Ken Singleton	1975–1984	OF
Chance Sisco	2017–2021	C
Doug Sisk	1988	P
**George Sisler**	1915–1927	1B
Dave Skaggs	1977–1980	C
Austin Slater	2024	OF
Lou Sleater	1950–1952, 1958	P
Tod Sloan	1913–1919	OF
Heathcliff Slocumb	1998–1999	P
Al Smith	1963	OF
Billy Smith	1977–1979	2B
Burch Smith	2024	P
Dwight Smith	1994	OF
Dwight Smith Jr.	2019–2020	OF
Earl Smith	1917–1921	OF
Ed Smith	1906	P
Hal Smith	1955–1956	C
**Lee Smith**	1994	P
Lonnie Smith	1993–1994	OF
Mark Smith	1994–1996	OF
Mike Smith	1989–1990	P
Nate Smith	1962	C
Pete Smith	1998	P
Roy Smith	1991	P
Seth Smith	2017	OF
Syd Smith	1908	C
Wib Smith	1909	C
Henry Smoyer	1912	SS
Charlie Snell	1912	C
Nate Snell	1984–1986	P
Travis Snider	2015	OF
Brandon Snyder	2010–2011	1B
Chris Snyder	2013	C
Russ Snyder	1961–1967	OF
Miguel Socolovich	2012	P
Moose Solters	1935–1936, 1939	OF
Bill Sommers	1950	3B
Sammy Sosa	2005	OF
Allen Sothoron	1914–1921	P
Gregory Soto	2024–2025	P
Liván Soto	2024	SS
Clyde Southwick	1911	C
Bob Spade	1910	P
Tully Sparks	1901	P
Stan Spence	1949	OF
Hack Spencer	1912	P
Tubby Spencer	1905–1908	C
Paul Speraw	1920	3B
Hal Spindel	1939	C
Brad Springer	1925	P
Jay Spurgeon	2000	P
Jacob Stallings	2025	C
Don Stanhouse	1978–1979, 1982	P
Pete Stanicek	1987–1988	OF
Buck Stanton	1931	OF
Charlie Starr	1905	2B
Dick Starr	1949–1951	P
Herman Starrette	1963–1965	P
Ed Stauffer	1925	P
John Stefero	1983–1986	C
Bryan Stephens	1948	P
Gene Stephens	1960–1961	OF
Jim Stephens	1907–1912	C
John Stephens	2002	P
Vern Stephens	1941–1947, 1953–1955	SS
Earl Stephenson	1977–1978	P
Garrett Stephenson	1996	P
Adam Stern	2007	OF
Chuck Stevens	1941–1948	1B
D. J. Stewart	2018–2022	OF
Lefty Stewart	1927–1932	P
Sammy Stewart	1978–1985	P
Fred Stiely	1929–1931	P
Rollie Stiles	1930–1933	P
Royle Stillman	1975–1976	OF
Josh Stinson	2013–2014	P
Snuffy Stirnweiss	1950	2B
Wes Stock	1959–1964	P
Tim Stoddard	1978–1983	P
Dean Stone	1963	P
Dwight Stone	1913	P
George Stone	1905–1910	OF
Jeff Stone	1988	OF
Steve Stone	1979–1981	P
Lin Storti	1930–1933	3B
George Stovall	1912–1913	1B
Kyle Stowers	2022–2024	OF
Dan Straily	2019	P
Alan Strange	1934–1935, 1940–1942	SS
Ed Strelecki	1928–1929	P
Phil Stremmel	1909–1910	P
Bill Strickland	1937	P
Pedro Strop	2011–2013	P
Kade Strowd	2025-Present	P
Luke Stuart	1921	2B
Marlin Stuart	1952–1954	P
Drew Stubbs	2016	OF
Guy Sturdy	1927–1928	1B
Albert Suárez	2024–Present	P
Jim Suchecki	1951	P
Jesús Sucre	2019	C
Willie Sudhoff	1902–1905	P
Tomoyuki Sugano	2025	P
Joe Sugden	1902–1905	C
Billy Sullivan Jr.	1938–1939	C
John Sullivan	1949	SS
Beau Sulser	2022	P
Cole Sulser	2020–2021	P
Gordie Sundin	1956	P
Steve Sundra	1942–1946	P
B. J. Surhoff	1996–2000, 2003–2005	OF
Andrew Susac	2018	C
George Susce	1940	C
Rick Sutcliffe	1992–1993	P
Bill Swaggerty	1983–1986	P
Pinky Swander	1903–1904	OF
Pedro Swann	2003	OF
Bud Swartz	1947	P
Bob Swift	1940–1942	C
Jeff Tackett	1991–1994	C
Vito Tamulis	1938	P
Tony Tarasco	1996–1997	OF
Willie Tasby	1958–1960	OF
Dillon Tate	2019–2022, 2024	P
Fernando Tatís	2006	3B
Craig Tatum	2010–2011	C
Jesús Tavárez	1998	OF
Ben Taylor	1951	1B
Dorn Taylor	1990	P
Joe Taylor	1958–1959	OF
Pete Taylor	1952	P
Wiley Taylor	1913–1914	P
Taylor Teagarden	2012–2013	C
Miguel Tejada	2004–2007, 2010	SS
Rubén Tejada	2017	SS
Anthony Telford	1990–1991, 1993	P
Johnny Temple	1962	2B
Tom Tennant	1912	?
Luis Terrero	2006	OF
John Terry	1903	P
Mickey Tettleton	1988–1990	C
Bud Thomas	1951	SS
Fay Thomas	1935	P
Leo Thomas	1950, 1952	3B
Tommy Thomas	1936–1937	P
Valmy Thomas	1960	C
**Jim Thome**	2012	DH
Frank Thompson	1920	3B
Hank Thompson	1947	3B
Tommy Thompson	1939	OF
Bobby Thomson	1960	OF
Marv Throneberry	1961–1962	1B
Mark Thurmond	1988–1989	P
Sloppy Thurston	1923	P
Jay Tibbs	1988–1990	P
Les Tietje	1936–1938	P
Chris Tillman	2009–2018	P
Johnny Tillman	1915	P
Mike Timlin	1999–2000	P
Jack Tobin	1916–1925	OF
Steve Tolleson	2012	3B
Ashur Tolliver	2016	P
George Tomer	1913	?
Eider Torres	2008	2B
Mike Torrez	1975	P
Josh Towers	2001–2002	P
Jim Traber	1984–1989	1B
Steve Trachsel	2007–2008	P
Gus Triandos	1955–1962	C
Mike Trombley	2000–2001	P
Chadwick Tromp	2025	C
Bill Trotter	1937–1942	P
Dizzy Trout	1957	P
Virgil Trucks	1953	P
Frank Truesdale	1910–1911	2B
Mark Trumbo	2016-2019	OF
Bob Turley	1951–1954	P
Justin Turner	2009–2010	IF
Shane Turner	1991	3B
Tom Turner	1944	C
Tom Underwood	1984	P
Koji Uehara	2009–2011	P
Dixie Upright	1953	?
Tom Upton	1950–1951	SS
Ramón Urías	2020–2025	SS
Henry Urrutia	2013, 2015	DH
Harry Vahrenhorst	1904	?
Pat Valaika	2020–2021	SS
César Valdez	2020–2021	P
Fred Valentine	1959–1963, 1968	OF
Danny Valencia	2013, 2018	3B
Fernando Valenzuela	1993	P
Breyvic Valera	2018	2B
Chris Vallimont	2023	P
Russ Van Atta	1935–1939	P
Rick van den Hurk	2010–2011	P
Dave Van Gorder	1987	C
Andy Van Slyke	1995	OF
Ike Van Zandt	1905	OF
Elam Vangilder	1919–1927	P
Terrin Vavra	2022–2023, 2025	2B/OF
Luis Vázquez	2025	SS
Andrew Velazquez	2020	SS
Logan Verrett	2017	P
Nick Vespi	2022–2024	P
Thyago Vieira	2024	P
Engelb Vielma	2018	2B/SS
Jonathan Villar	2018-2019	2B
Dave Vineyard	1964	P
Pedro Viola	2010–2011	P
Ozzie Virgil	1962	3B
Jack Voigt	1992–1995	OF
Ollie Voigt	1924	P
Joe Vosmik	1937	OF
Austin Voth	2022–2023	P
Brandon Waddell	2021	P
Rube Waddell	1908–1910	P
Frank Waddey	1931	OF
Jake Wade	1939	P
Konner Wade	2021	P
Kermit Wahl	1951	3B
Eddie Waitkus	1954–1955	1B
Fred Walden	1912	C
Irv Waldron	1901	OF
Christian Walker	2014–2015	1B
Ernie Walker	1913–1915	OF
Greg Walker	1990	1B
Jamie Walker	2007–2009	P
Jerry Walker	1957–1960	P
Tilly Walker	1913–1915	OF
Jim Walkup	1934–1939	P
**Bobby Wallace**	1902–1916	SS
Dee Walsh	1913–1915	OF
Jerome Walton	1997	OF
Pete Ward	1962	3B
Taylor Ward	2026-Present	OF
Buzzy Wares	1913–1914	SS
Hal Warnock	1935	OF
Carl Warwick	1965	OF
John Wasdin	2001	P
David Washington	2017	OF
Ron Washington	1987	SS
Chris Waters	2008–2009	P
Spenser Watkins	2021–2022	P
Eddie Watt	1966–1973	P
Art Weaver	1905	C
Jim Weaver	1934, 1938	P
Jacob Webb	2023–2024	P
Ryan Webb	2014	P
Lenny Webster	1997–1999	C
Jemile Weeks	2014	2B
Bob Weiland	1935	P
Carl Weilman	1912–1920	P
Don Welchel	1982–1983	P
Alex Wells	2021–2022	P
David Wells	1996	P
Ed Wells	1933–1934	P
Tyler Wells	2021–present	P
George Werley	1956	P
Vic Wertz	1952–1954	OF
Lefty West	1944–1945	P
Sam West	1933–1938	OF
Jordan Westburg	2023–Present	3B
Wally Westlake	1955	OF
Mickey Weston	1989–1990	P
Dutch Wetzel	1920–1921	OF
Bill Whaley	1923	OF
Fuzz White	1940	OF
Hal White	1953	P
John Whitehead	1939–1942	P
Eli Whiteside	2005	C
Ernie Whitt	1991	C
Chris Widger	2006	C
Al Widmar	1948–1951	P
Matt Wieters	2009–2016	C
Alan Wiggins	1985–1987	2B
Ty Wigginton	2009–2010	1B/3B/2B
Bill Wight	1955–1957	P
Hoyt Wilhelm	1958–1962	P
Stevie Wilkerson	2018-2019, 2021	OF
Brian Williams	1997	P
Dallas Williams	1981	OF
**Dick Williams**	1956–1958, 1961–1962	OF
Earl Williams	1973–1974	C
Gus Williams	1911–1915	OF
Jimmy Williams	1908–1909	2B
Ken Williams	1918–1927	OF
Mason Williams	2019-2020	OF
Todd Williams	2004–2007	P
Mark Williamson	1987–1994	P
Scott Williamson	2007	P
Joe Willis	1911	P
Frank Wilson	1928	OF
Jim Wilson	1948, 1955–1956	P
Tyler Wilson	2015–2017	P
Hal Wiltse	1928	P
Ralph Winegarner	1949	P
Ernie Wingard	1924–1927	P
Jerry Witte	1946–1947	1B
Asher Wojciechowski	2019–2020	P
Randy Wolf	2012	P
Grant Wolfram	2025–Present	P
Ken Wood	1948–1951	OF
Gene Woodling	1955, 1958–1960	OF
Vance Worley	2016	P
Mark Worrell	2011	P
Tim Worrell	2000	P
Craig Worthington	1988–1991	3B
Matt Wotherspoon	2019	P
Gene Wright	1903–1904	P
Jaret Wright	2007	P
Jim Wright	1927–1928	P
Mike Wright	2015–2019	P
Rasty Wright	1917–1923	P
Tom Wright	1952	OF
Wesley Wright	2015	P
Austin Wynns	2018–2019, 2021	C
Jimmy Yacabonis	2017-2019	P
Esteban Yan	1996–1997	P
Joe Yeager	1907–1908	3B
Gabriel Ynoa	2017, 2019	P
Bobby Young	1951–1955	2B
Brandon Young	2025–Present	P
Delmon Young	2014–2015	OF/DH
Mike Young	1982–1987	OF
Russ Young	1931	C
Walter Young	2005	1B
Tom Zachary	1926–1927	P
Víctor Zambrano	2007	P
Al Zarilla	1943–1949, 1952	OF
Gregg Zaun	1995–1996, 2009	C
Todd Zeile	1996	3B
Bruce Zimmermann	2020–2023	P
Sam Zoldak	1944–1948	P
Frank Zupo	1957–1961	C
George Zuverink	1955–1959	P
