= 1910 St. Louis Browns season =

Major League Baseball season

1910 St. Louis Browns
- League: American League
- Ballpark: Sportsman's Park
- City: St. Louis, Missouri
- Record: 47–107 (.305)
- League place: 8th
- Owners: Robert Hedges
- Managers: Jack O'Connor

The 1910 St. Louis Browns season was a season in American baseball. It involved the Browns finishing 8th in the American League with a record of 47 wins and 107 losses.

== Regular season ==
=== Season standings ===
American League
Team	W	L	Pct.	GB	Home	Road
Philadelphia Athletics	102	48	.680	—	57‍–‍19	45‍–‍29
New York Highlanders	88	63	.583	14½	49‍–‍25	39‍–‍38
Detroit Tigers	86	68	.558	18	46‍–‍31	40‍–‍37
Boston Red Sox	81	72	.529	22½	51‍–‍28	30‍–‍44
Cleveland Naps	71	81	.467	32	39‍–‍36	32‍–‍45
Chicago White Sox	68	85	.444	35½	41‍–‍37	27‍–‍48
Washington Senators	66	85	.437	36½	38‍–‍35	28‍–‍50
St. Louis Browns	47	107	.305	57	26‍–‍51	21‍–‍56

=== Record vs. opponents ===
1910 American League record Sources:
Team	BOS	CWS	CLE	DET	NYH	PHA	SLB	WSH
Boston	—	10–12	14–8–3	12–10	9–13–1	4–18	16–6	16–5–1
Chicago	12–10	—	10–12	9–13	8–13–2	8–14–1	12–10	9–13
Cleveland	8–14–3	12–10	—	9–13	8–13	7–14–4	18–4–1	9–13–1
Detroit	10–12	13–9	13–9	—	13–9	9–13	15–7	13–9–1
New York	13–9–1	13–8–2	13–8	9–13	—	9–12	16–6–1	15–7–1
Philadelphia	18–4	14–8–1	14–7–4	13–9	12–9	—	17–5	14–6
St. Louis	6–16	10–12	4–18–1	7–15	6–16–1	5–17	—	9–13–2
Washington	5–16–1	13–9	13–9–1	9–13–1	7–15–1	6–14	13–9–2	—

=== Notable transactions ===
- June 15, 1910: Bob Spade was selected off waivers by the Browns from the Cincinnati Reds.

=== Roster ===
1910 St. Louis Browns
Roster
Pitchers: Bill Bailey; Ray Boyd; Bill Crouch; Jack Gilligan; Bill Grahame; Marc Hall; Harry Howell; Ed Kinsella; Joe Lake; Fred Link; Alex Malloy; Roy Mitchell; Red Nelson; Barney Pelty; Jack Powell; Farmer Ray; Bob Spade; Phil Stremmel; Rube Waddell	Catchers: Sled Allen; Joe Crisp; Bill Killefer; Jack O'Connor; Jim Stephens; Infielders: Bill Abstein; Red Corriden; Dode Criss; Bert Graham; Roy Hartzell; Ray Jansen; Joe McDonald; Tommy Mee; Pat Newnam; Frank Truesdale; Bobby Wallace	Outfielders: Ray Demmitt; Red Fisher; Art Griggs; Danny Hoffman; Hub Northen; Al Schweitzer; George Stone	Manager: Jack O'Connor

== Player stats ==
=== Batting ===
==== Starters by position ====
Note: Pos = Position; G = Games played; AB = At bats; H = Hits; Avg. = Batting average; HR = Home runs; RBI = Runs batted in

Pos	Player	G	AB	H	Avg.	HR	RBI
C	Jim Stephens	99	289	62	.215	0	23
1B	Pat Newnam	103	384	83	.216	2	26
2B	Frank Truesdale	123	415	91	.219	1	25
SS	Bobby Wallace	138	501	131	.258	0	37
3B	Roy Hartzell	151	542	118	.218	2	30
OF	George Stone	152	562	144	.256	0	40
OF	Al Schweitzer	113	379	87	.230	2	37
OF	Danny Hoffman	106	380	90	.237	0	27

==== Other batters ====
Note: G = Games played; AB = At bats; H = Hits; Avg. = Batting average; HR = Home runs; RBI = Runs batted in

Player	G	AB	H	Avg.	HR	RBI
Art Griggs	123	416	98	.236	2	30
Bill Killefer	74	193	24	.124	0	7
Hub Northen	26	96	19	.198	0	16
Dode Criss	70	91	21	.231	1	11
Bill Abstein	25	87	13	.149	0	3
Red Corriden	26	84	13	.155	1	4
Red Fisher	23	72	9	.125	0	3
Joe McDonald	10	32	5	.156	0	1
Bert Graham	8	26	3	.115	0	5
Ray Demmitt	10	23	4	.174	0	2
Sled Allen	14	23	3	.130	0	1
Tommy Mee	8	19	3	.158	0	1
Ray Jansen	1	5	4	.800	0	0
Joe Crisp	1	1	0	.000	0	0
Jack O'Connor	1	0	0	----	0	0

=== Pitching ===
==== Starting pitchers ====
Note: G = Games pitched; IP = Innings pitched; W = Wins; L = Losses; ERA = Earned run average; SO = Strikeouts

Player	G	IP	W	L	ERA	SO
Joe Lake	35	261.1	11	17	2.20	141
Barney Pelty	27	165.1	5	11	3.48	48
Farmer Ray	21	140.2	4	10	3.58	35
Jack Powell	21	129.1	7	11	2.30	52
Red Nelson	7	60.0	5	1	2.55	30
Alex Malloy	7	52.2	0	6	2.56	27
Roy Mitchell	6	52.0	4	2	2.60	23
Marc Hall	8	46.1	1	7	4.27	25
Bob Spade	7	34.2	1	3	4.41	8
Fred Link	3	17.0	0	1	4.24	5
Bill Crouch	1	8.0	0	0	3.38	2

==== Other pitchers ====
Note: G = Games pitched; IP = Innings pitched; W = Wins; L = Losses; ERA = Earned run average; SO = Strikeouts

Player	G	IP	W	L	ERA	SO
Bill Bailey	34	192.1	3	18	3.32	90
Ed Kinsella	10	50.0	1	3	3.78	10
Bill Grahame	9	43.0	0	8	3.56	12
Jack Gilligan	9	39.1	0	3	3.66	10
Rube Waddell	10	33.0	3	1	3.55	16
Phil Stremmel	5	29.0	0	2	3.72	7
Ray Boyd	3	14.1	0	2	4.40	6

==== Relief pitchers ====
Note: G = Games pitched; W = Wins; L = Losses; SV = Saves; ERA = Earned run average; SO = Strikeouts

Player	G	W	L	SV	ERA	SO
Dode Criss	6	2	1	0	1.40	9
Harry Howell	1	0	0	0	10.80	1
