= William Crouch =

William or Bill Crouch may refer to:

- William W. Crouch (born 1941), U.S. army general
- William Forest Crouch (1904–1968), American director and writer of film
- Bill Crouch (1910s pitcher) (1886–1945), Major League Baseball pitcher
- Bill Crouch (1940s pitcher) (1907–1980), Major League Baseball pitcher
- Bill Crouch (photographer), won the 1950 Pulitzer Prize for Photography
- William Crouch, birth name of Scottish philosopher William MacAskill (born 1987).
