= Red Nelson =

Red Nelson may refer to:

- Red Nelson (baseball)
- Red Nelson (musician)
