= Mickey McGuire (baseball) =

American baseball player (1941–2025)

- Shortstop / Second baseman
- Born: January 18, 1941; Dayton, Ohio, U.S.
- Died: October 19, 2025 (aged 84)
- Batted: Right Threw: Right

MLB debut
- September 7, 1962, for the Baltimore Orioles

Last MLB appearance
- October 1, 1967, for the Baltimore Orioles

MLB statistics
- Batting average: .190
- Home runs: 0
- Runs batted in: 2
- Stats at Baseball Reference

Teams
- Baltimore Orioles (1962; 1967); Hiroshima Toyo Carp (1973–1974)

M. C. Adolphus McGuire Jr. (January 18, 1941 – October 19, 2025) was an American professional baseball player. He was a second baseman and shortstop in Major League Baseball who played for the Baltimore Orioles in the 1962 and 1967 seasons. Listed at 5 feet 10 inches (1.78 m), 170 pounds (77 kg), McGuire batted and threw right-handed. He was born in Dayton, Ohio.

In a two-season career, McGuire was a .190 hitter (4-for-21) with two runs and two RBI in 16 games. He did not register an extra-base hit. McGuire died on October 19, 2025, at the age of 84.

== See also ==
- 1962 Baltimore Orioles season
- 1967 Baltimore Orioles season
- Baltimore Orioles all-time roster
