= 1910 New York Highlanders season =

Baseball team season

1910 New York Highlanders
- League: American League
- Ballpark: Hilltop Park
- City: New York City, New York
- Record: 88–63 (.583)
- League place: 2nd
- Owners: William Devery and Frank Farrell
- Managers: George Stallings and Hal Chase

The 1910 New York Highlanders season saw the team finishing with a total of 88 wins and 63 losses, coming in second in the American League.

New York was managed by George Stallings and Hal Chase. Their home games were played at Hilltop Park. The alternate and equally unofficial nickname, "Yankees", was being used more and more frequently by the media.

== Regular season ==
- August 30, 1910: Tom Hughes threw nine no-hit innings against the Cleveland Naps, but the game was tied 0–0, so the game went to extra innings. Hughes gave up a hit with one out in the tenth, then wound up giving up five runs in the eleventh to lose the game, 5–0. The franchise would wait another seven years for their first official no-hitter.

=== Season standings ===
American League
Team	W	L	Pct.	GB	Home	Road
Philadelphia Athletics	102	48	.680	—	57‍–‍19	45‍–‍29
New York Highlanders	88	63	.583	14½	49‍–‍25	39‍–‍38
Detroit Tigers	86	68	.558	18	46‍–‍31	40‍–‍37
Boston Red Sox	81	72	.529	22½	51‍–‍28	30‍–‍44
Cleveland Naps	71	81	.467	32	39‍–‍36	32‍–‍45
Chicago White Sox	68	85	.444	35½	41‍–‍37	27‍–‍48
Washington Senators	66	85	.437	36½	38‍–‍35	28‍–‍50
St. Louis Browns	47	107	.305	57	26‍–‍51	21‍–‍56

=== Record vs. opponents ===
1910 American League record Sources:
Team	BOS	CWS	CLE	DET	NYH	PHA	SLB	WSH
Boston	—	10–12	14–8–3	12–10	9–13–1	4–18	16–6	16–5–1
Chicago	12–10	—	10–12	9–13	8–13–2	8–14–1	12–10	9–13
Cleveland	8–14–3	12–10	—	9–13	8–13	7–14–4	18–4–1	9–13–1
Detroit	10–12	13–9	13–9	—	13–9	9–13	15–7	13–9–1
New York	13–9–1	13–8–2	13–8	9–13	—	9–12	16–6–1	15–7–1
Philadelphia	18–4	14–8–1	14–7–4	13–9	12–9	—	17–5	14–6
St. Louis	6–16	10–12	4–18–1	7–15	6–16–1	5–17	—	9–13–2
Washington	5–16–1	13–9	13–9–1	9–13–1	7–15–1	6–14	13–9–2	—

=== Notable transactions ===
- May 26, 1910: Red Kleinow was purchased from the Highlanders by the Boston Red Sox.
- August 5, 1910: Johnny Priest was purchased by the Highlanders from the Danville Red Sox.

=== Roster ===
1910 New York Highlanders
Roster
Pitchers: Ray Caldwell; Slow Joe Doyle; Ray Fisher; Russ Ford; John Frill; Tom Hughes; Rube Manning; Jack Quinn; Hippo Vaughn; Jack Warhop	Catchers: Walter Blair; Lou Criger; Red Kleinow; Fred Mitchell; Ed Sweeney; Joe Walsh; Infielders: Jimmy Austin; Hal Chase; Eddie Foster; Earle Gardner; John Knight; Frank LaPorte; Roxey Roach	Outfielders: Les Channell; Birdie Cree; Bert Daniels; Clyde Engle; Charlie Hemphill; Larry McClure; Harry Wolter; Other positions: Tommy Madden	Manager: Hal Chase; George Stallings

== Player stats ==
=== Batting ===
==== Starters by position ====
Note: Pos = Position; G = Games played; AB = At bats; H = Hits; Avg. = Batting average; HR = Home runs; RBI = Runs batted in

Pos	Player	G	AB	H	Avg.	HR	RBI
C	Ed Sweeney	78	215	43	.200	0	13
1B	Hal Chase	130	524	152	.290	3	73
2B	Frank LaPorte	124	432	114	.264	2	67
SS	John Knight	117	414	129	.312	3	45
3B	Jimmy Austin	133	432	94	.218	2	36
OF	Birdie Cree	134	467	134	.287	4	73
OF	Charlie Hemphill	102	351	84	.239	0	21
OF	Harry Wolter	135	479	128	.267	4	42

==== Other batters ====
Note: G = Games played; AB = At bats; H = Hits; Avg. = Batting average; HR = Home runs; RBI = Runs batted in

Player	G	AB	H	Avg.	HR	RBI
Bert Daniels	95	356	90	.253	1	17
Earle Gardner	86	271	66	.244	1	24
Roxey Roach	70	220	47	.214	0	20
Fred Mitchell	68	196	45	.230	0	18
Eddie Foster	30	83	11	.133	0	1
Lou Criger	27	69	13	.188	0	4
Walter Blair	6	22	5	.227	0	2
Les Channell	6	19	6	.316	0	3
Clyde Engle	5	13	3	.231	0	0
Red Kleinow	6	12	5	.417	0	2
Joe Walsh	1	4	2	.500	0	2
Tommy Madden	1	1	0	.000	0	0
Larry McClure	1	1	0	.000	0	0

=== Pitching ===
==== Starting pitchers ====
Note: G = Games pitched; IP = Innings pitched; W = Wins; L = Losses; ERA = Earned run average; SO = Strikeouts

Player	G	IP	W	L	ERA	SO
Russ Ford	36	299.2	26	6	1.65	209
Jack Warhop	37	243.0	14	14	3.00	75
Jack Quinn	35	235.2	18	12	2.37	82
Hippo Vaughn	30	221.2	13	11	1.83	107

==== Other pitchers ====
Note: G = Games pitched; IP = Innings pitched; W = Wins; L = Losses; ERA = Earned run average; SO = Strikeouts

Player	G	IP	W	L	ERA	SO
Tom Hughes	23	151.2	7	9	3.50	64
Ray Fisher	17	92.1	5	3	2.92	42
Rube Manning	16	75.0	2	4	3.72	25
John Frill	10	48.1	2	2	4.47	27
Ray Caldwell	6	19.1	1	0	3.17	17
Slow Joe Doyle	3	12.1	0	2	8.03	6
