= Fort Lyon, Colorado =

Unincorporated community in Bent County, CO, USA

- Unincorporated community
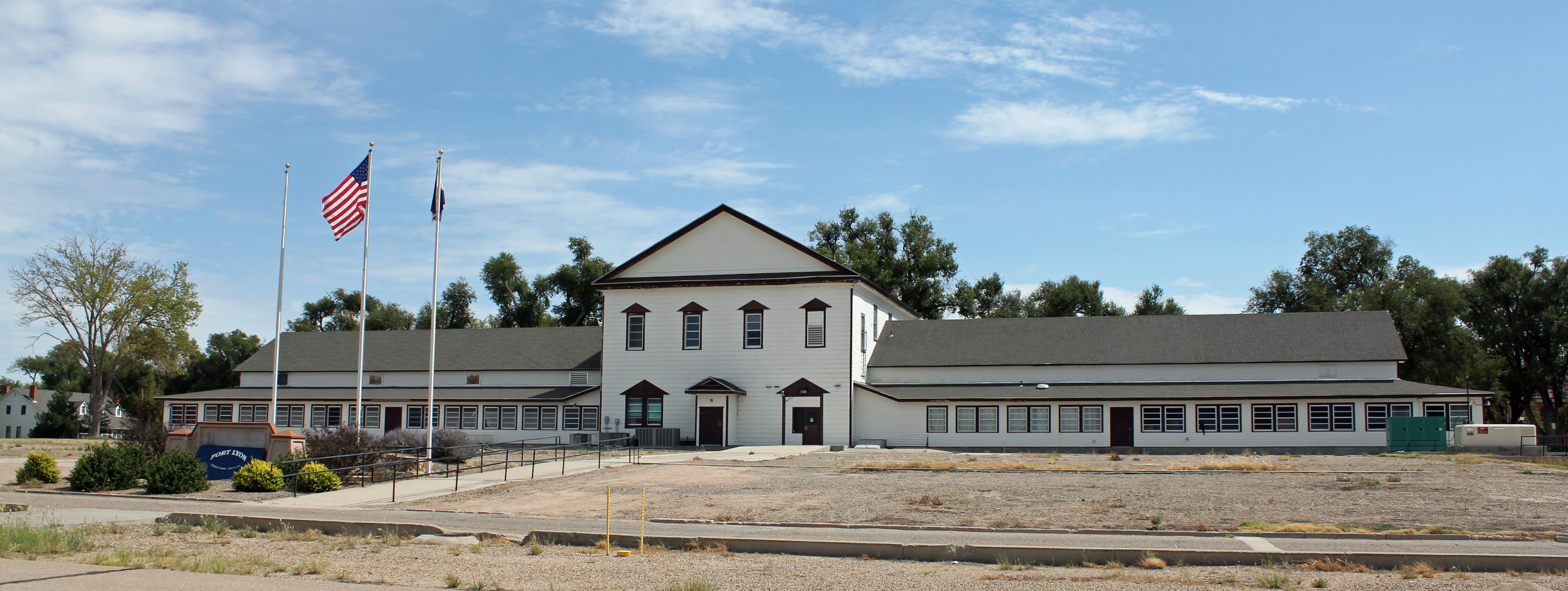
- Fort Lyon (2013)

- Location within Colorado Location within the United States
- Coordinates: 38°05′48″N 103°09′07″W
- Country: United States
- State: Colorado
- County: Bent
- Elevation: 3,888 ft (1,185 m)
- Time zone: UTC−7 (MST)
  - Summer (DST): UTC−6 (MDT)
- ZIP Code: 81054
- Area code: 719
- GNIS ID: 204828

Fort Lyon is an unincorporated community and U.S. Post Office in Bent County, Colorado, United States.

== History ==
A post office called Fort Lyon was established in 1862. The Fort Lyon Post Office had the ZIP Code 81038, though the zip code for nearby Las Animas (81054) is also used.

The community was named after Nathaniel Lyon, an officer in the American Civil War.

The ghost town of Sheridan, in Logan County, Kansas, became a railhead for westbound freight to the Santa Fe Trail on a 120-mile (190 km) wagon road to the area.

Some German prisoners of war built furniture, worked on local roads and were buried at Fort Lyon.

== Geography ==
=== Climate ===
According to the Köppen Climate Classification system, Fort Lyon has a semi-arid climate, abbreviated "BSk" on climate maps.

== Notable people ==
- Josephine Beatrice Bowman, Navy nurse stationed at Fort Lyon
- Kit Carson, a frontiersman who died at the surgeon's quarters in Fort Lyon.
- Eugene Davis, a doctor who managed a Veterans Administration facility in Fort Lyon.
- Walter McCaw, Army surgeon
- Farmer Ray, former Major League Baseball player, was born in Fort Lyon.
- Enoch Steen, United States military officer who commanded at Fort Lyon.
- Samuel F. Tappan, military officer
- William Nathaniel Thomas, Navy chaplain who served at the US Public Service Hospital.
- Edward W. Wynkoop, a post commander at Fort Lyon.
