= Farmer Ray =

American baseball player (1886-1963)

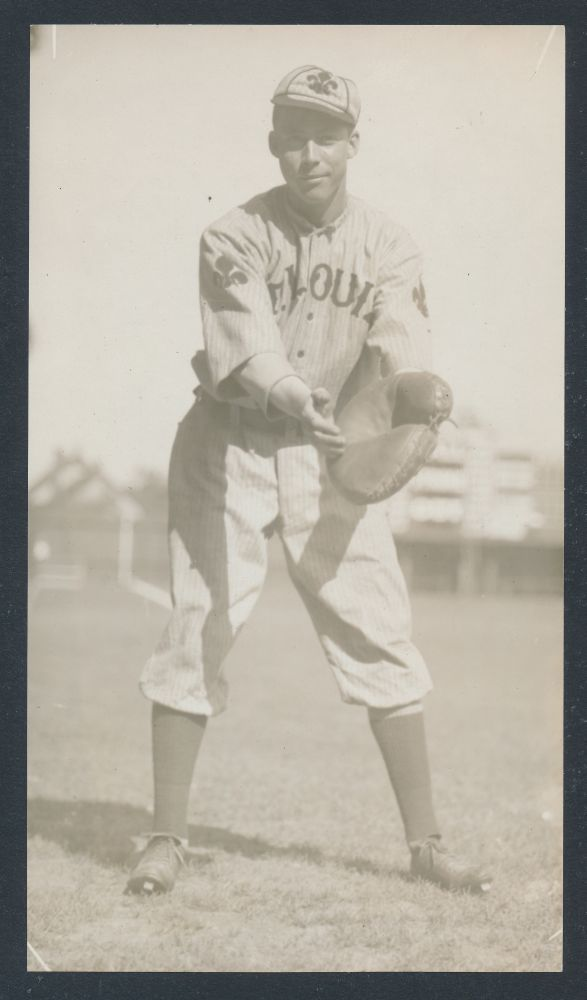
- Pitcher
- Born: September 17, 1886; Fort Lyon, Colorado, U.S.
- Died: March 11, 1963 (aged 76); Electra, Texas, U.S.
- Batted: Right Threw: Right

MLB debut
- June 13, 1910, for the St. Louis Browns

Last MLB appearance
- September 20, 1910, for the St. Louis Browns

MLB statistics
- Win–loss record: 4–10
- Earned run average: 3.58
- Strikeouts: 35
- Stats at Baseball Reference

Teams
- St. Louis Browns (1910)

Robert Henry "Farmer" Ray (September 17, 1886 – March 11, 1963) was an American Major League Baseball pitcher. Ray played for the St. Louis Browns in the 1910 season. In 21 career games, he had a 4–10 record, with a 3.58 ERA. He batted left and threw right-handed.

Ray was born in Fort Lyon, Colorado, and died in Electra, Texas.
