= Jack Gilligan (baseball) =

American baseball player (1885-1980)

- Pitcher
- Born: October 18, 1885; Chicago, Illinois, U.S.
- Died: November 19, 1980 (aged 95); Modesto, California, U.S.
- Batted: Right Threw: Right

MLB debut
- September 16, 1909, for the St. Louis Browns

Last MLB appearance
- July 4, 1910, for the St. Louis Browns

MLB statistics
- Win–loss record: 1–5
- Earned run average: 4.33
- Strikeouts: 14
- Stats at Baseball Reference

Teams
- St. Louis Browns (1909–1910)

John Patrick Gilligan (born John Peter Gilgen, October 18, 1885 – November 19, 1980) was an American Major League Baseball pitcher. Gilligan played for the St. Louis Browns in 1909 and 1910.
