= Marc Hall (baseball) =

American baseball player (1887–1915)

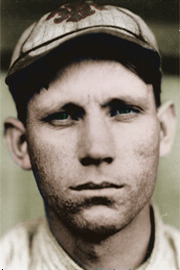
- Pitcher
- Born: August 12, 1887; Joplin, Missouri, U.S.
- Died: February 24, 1915 (aged 27); Joplin, Missouri, U.S.
- Batted: Right Threw: Right

MLB debut
- August 20, 1910, for the St. Louis Browns

Last MLB appearance
- July 29, 1914, for the Detroit Tigers

MLB statistics
- Win–loss record: 15–25
- Earned run average: 3.25
- Strikeouts: 112
- Stats at Baseball Reference

Teams
- St. Louis Browns (1910); Detroit Tigers (1913–1914)

Marcus Hall (August 12, 1887 – February 24, 1915) was an American professional baseball pitcher. He played in Major League Baseball (MLB) for the St. Louis Browns and Detroit Tigers. His professional career spanned 1909 to 1914, and included time in Minor League Baseball in the Western Association and Western League. While still an active player, Hall died in February 1915 at his home in Joplin, Missouri of diabetes-related complications.

== See also ==
- List of baseball players who died during their careers
