= Frank Truesdale =

American baseball player (1884–1943)

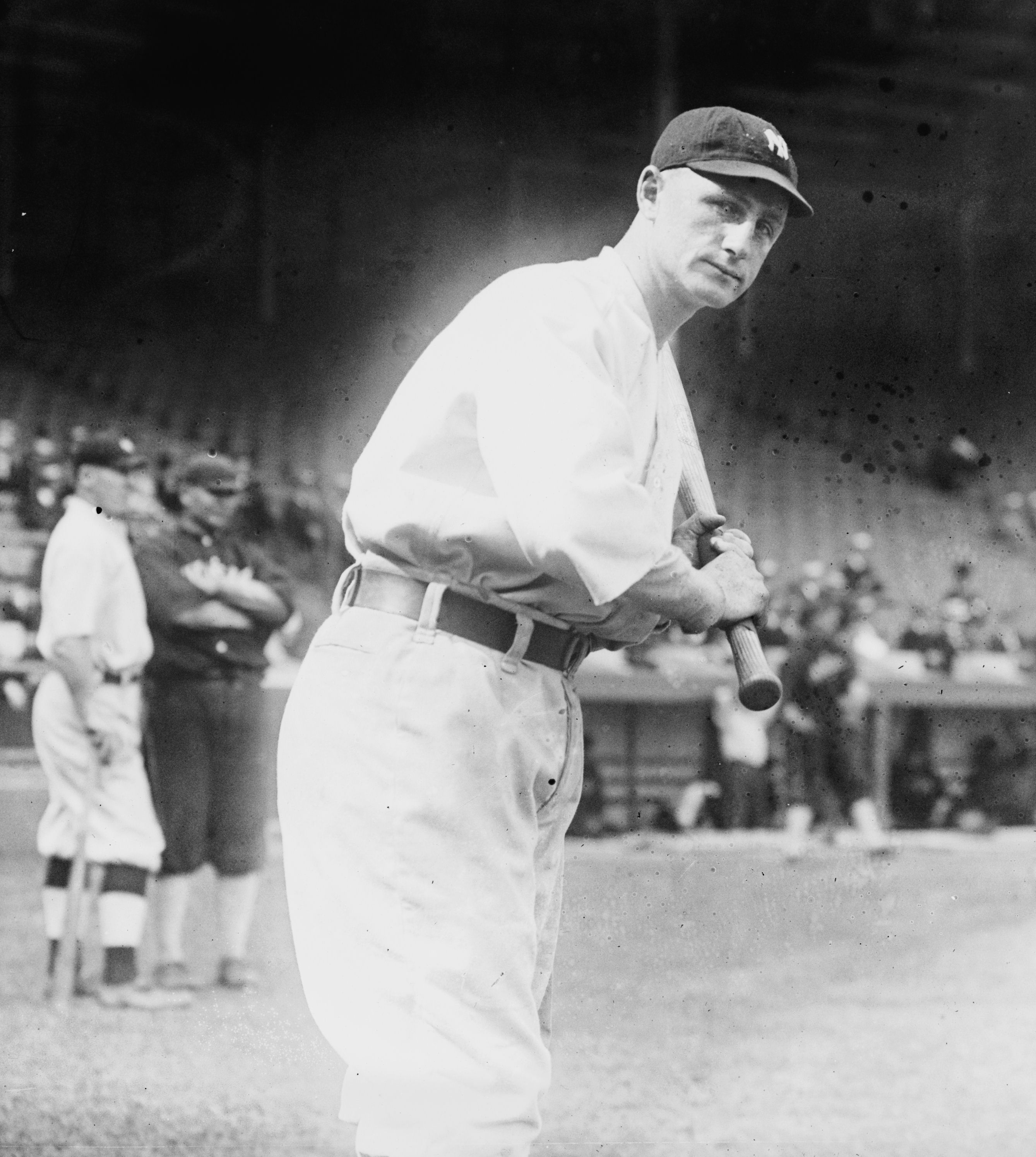
- Truesdale in 1914
- Second baseman
- Born: March 31, 1884; St. Louis, Missouri, U.S.
- Died: August 27, 1943 (aged 59); Albuquerque, New Mexico, U.S.
- Batted: Both Threw: Right

MLB debut
- April 27, 1910, for the St. Louis Browns

Last MLB appearance
- July 30, 1918, for the Boston Red Sox

MLB statistics
- Batting average: .220
- Home runs: 1
- Runs batted in: 40
- Stats at Baseball Reference

Teams
- St. Louis Browns (1910–1911); New York Yankees (1914); Boston Red Sox (1918)

Frank Day Truesdale (March 31, 1884 – August 27, 1943) was an American second baseman in Major League Baseball who played from 1910 through 1918 for the St. Louis Browns (1910–1911), New York Yankees (1914) and Boston Red Sox (1918). Listed at 5 feet 8 inches (1.73 m), 145 lb., Truesdale was a switch-hitter and threw right-handed. He was born in St. Louis, Missouri.

In a four-season career, Truesdale was a .220 hitter (147-for-668) with one home run and 40 RBI in 216 games, including 68 runs, 12 doubles, two triples, 41 stolen bases, and a .318 on-base percentage.

He was a member of the 1918 American League champion Red Sox, although he did not play in the World Series.

Truesdale died at the age of 59 in Albuquerque, New Mexico.
