= Bill Grahame =

American baseball player (1884-1936)

- Pitcher
- Born: July 22, 1883; Owosso, Michigan, U.S.
- Died: February 15, 1936 (aged 52); Holt, Michigan, U.S.
- Batted: Unknown Threw: Left

MLB debut
- April 18, 1908, for the St. Louis Browns

Last MLB appearance
- June 14, 1910, for the St. Louis Browns

MLB statistics
- Win–loss record: 14–29
- Earned run average: 2.90
- Strikeouts: 141
- Stats at Baseball Reference

Teams
- St. Louis Browns (1908–1910)

William James Grahame (July 22, 1884 – February 15, 1936), was a professional baseball player who played pitcher in the Major Leagues in 1908-1910. He would play for the St. Louis Browns.
