= Tommy Mee =

American baseball player

- Infielder
- Born: March 18, 1890; Chicago, Illinois, U.S.
- Died: May 16, 1981 (aged 91); Chicago, Illinois, U.S.
- Batted: Right Threw: Right

MLB debut
- June 14, 1910, for the St. Louis Browns

Last MLB appearance
- July 21, 1910, for the St. Louis Browns

MLB statistics
- Batting average: .158
- Home runs: 0
- Runs batted in: 1
- Stats at Baseball Reference

Teams
- St. Louis Browns (1910)

Thomas William Mee (March 18, 1890 – May 16, 1981), nicknamed "Judge", was an American Major League Baseball infielder who played in 1910 with the St. Louis Browns. A brother, Julie, played minor league baseball.
