= Fred Link =

American baseball player (1886-1939)

- Pitcher
- Born: March 11, 1886; Columbus, Ohio, U.S.
- Died: May 22, 1939 (aged 53); Houston, Texas, U.S.
- Batted: Left Threw: Left

MLB debut
- April 15, 1910, for the Cleveland Naps

Last MLB appearance
- August 25, 1910, for the St. Louis Browns

MLB statistics
- Pitching Record: 5-7
- Earned run average: 3.30
- Strikeouts: 60
- Stats at Baseball Reference

Teams
- Cleveland Naps (1910); St. Louis Browns (1910)

Edward Theodore Link (March 11, 1886 – May 22, 1939), nicknamed "Laddie", was an American Major League Baseball pitcher who played for one season. He pitched in 22 games for the Cleveland Naps during the 1910 Cleveland Naps season and three games for the St. Louis Browns during the 1910 St. Louis Browns season.

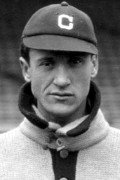
