= Bob Spade =

American baseball player (1877–1924)

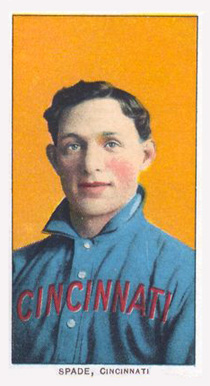
- Pitcher
- Born: January 4, 1877; Akron, Ohio, U.S.
- Died: September 7, 1924 (aged 47); Cincinnati, Ohio, U.S.
- Batted: Right Threw: Right

MLB debut
- September 22, 1907, for the Cincinnati Reds

Last MLB appearance
- July 21, 1910, for the St. Louis Browns

MLB statistics
- Win–loss record: 25–24
- Earned run average: 2.96
- Strikeouts: 121
- Stats at Baseball Reference

Teams
- Cincinnati Reds (1907–1910); St. Louis Browns (1910)

Robert Spade (January 4, 1877 – September 7, 1924) was a Major League Baseball pitcher. He played four seasons in the major leagues, from 1907 until 1910, for the Cincinnati Reds and St. Louis Browns.

When Spade died in 1924 he was penniless, and fans raised the money to pay for his burial.

== Sources ==
- Career statistics from Baseball Reference · Baseball Reference (Minors) · Retrosheet
