= Ray Jansen =

American baseball player (1889–1934)

- Third baseman
- Born: January 16, 1889; St. Louis, Missouri
- Died: March 19, 1934 (aged 45); St. Louis, Missouri
- Batted: Right Threw: Right

MLB debut
- September 30, 1910, for the St. Louis Browns

Last MLB appearance
- September 30, 1910, for the St. Louis Browns

MLB statistics
- Batting average: .800
- Home runs: 0
- Runs batted in: 0
- Stats at Baseball Reference

Teams
- St. Louis Browns (1910)

Raymond William Jansen (born January 16, 1889 – March 19, 1934), was an American professional baseball player who played third base in the Major Leagues in 1910 for the St. Louis Browns.

He was born and died in St. Louis, Missouri.

Ray Jansen had a very short (one game) but unique career in Major League Baseball. On September 30, 1910, with only eight games remaining in the Browns' season, the club—55 games out of first place—called on Jansen to play third base. Although the 21-year-old local boy had never played a professional game in his life, Jansen notched four singles in five at-bats. In the field he was less impressive, with three errors in ten total chances. The Browns lost the game to the Chicago White Sox, 9–1, and Jansen never played in the majors again. Jansen's four hits still is the record for the most hits in a one-game MLB career.

Jansen played for Class D Keokuk, Iowa in 1911 and stayed in the minors until 1918, making it up to Class A (then one step below the majors) Southern Association, but never made it back to the big leagues.
