= Bill Abstein =

American baseball player (1883–1940)

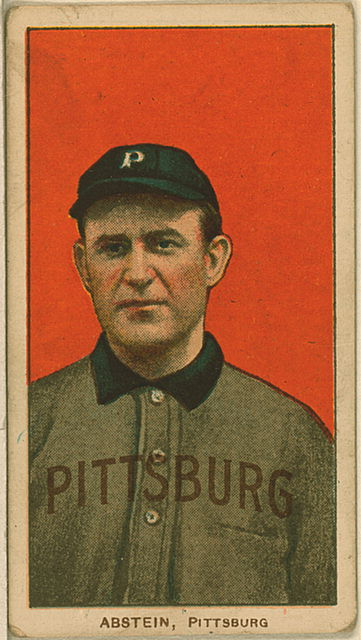
- First baseman
- Born: February 2, 1883; St. Louis, Missouri, U.S.
- Died: April 8, 1940 (aged 57); St. Louis, Missouri, U.S.
- Batted: Right Threw: Right

MLB debut
- September 25, 1906, for the Pittsburgh Pirates

Last MLB appearance
- June 2, 1910, for the St. Louis Browns

MLB statistics
- Batting average: .242
- Home runs: 1
- Runs batted in: 76
- Stats at Baseball Reference

Teams
- Pittsburgh Pirates (1906, 1909); St. Louis Browns (1910)

William Henry Abstein (February 2, 1883 – April 8, 1940), nicknamed "Big Bill", was an American professional baseball and amateur soccer player. He played all or part of three seasons in Major League Baseball, from 1906 to 1910, primarily as a first baseman. He played for the Pittsburgh Pirates and St. Louis Browns. He played in 170 games, with 150 hits, one home run, 76 RBI and a batting average of .242. He played for Pittsburgh during the 1909 World Series, appearing in all seven games and getting six hits.

Abstein spent the 1904–05 St. Louis Association Foot Ball League season with Diel F.C. which was managed by Thomas Cahill. He later played for Memphis Chicks in the Southern League. During those years, he also played soccer as a midfielder for St. Leo's in the St. Louis Soccer League during the off-season.
