= Bill Crouch (1910s pitcher) =

American baseball player (1886-1945)

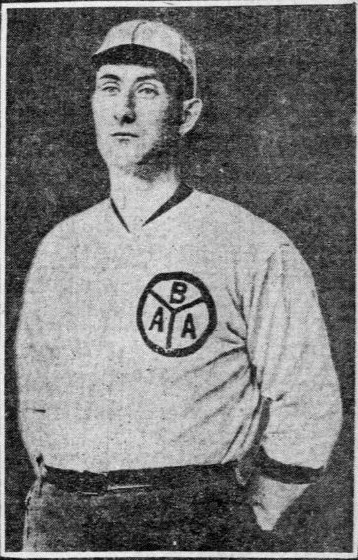
- Pitcher
- Born: December 3, 1886; Kiamensi, Delaware (now part of Wilmington, Delaware)
- Died: December 22, 1945 (aged 59); Highland Park, Michigan
- Batted: Left Threw: Left

MLB debut
- July 12, 1910, for the St. Louis Browns

Last MLB appearance
- July 12, 1910, for the St. Louis Browns

MLB statistics
- Win–loss record: 0–0
- Earned run average: 3.38
- Strikeouts: 2
- Stats at Baseball Reference

Teams
- St. Louis Browns (1910)

William Henry Crouch (December 3, 1886 – December 22, 1945) was a Major League Baseball pitcher during part of the 1910 season. The 6'1", 210 lb. left-hander was a native of Kiamensi, Delaware.

Crouch started one game for the St. Louis Browns. On July 12, 1910, he faced the Washington Senators at American League Park and the opposing pitcher was Walter Johnson, a future Hall of Famer. Crouch led 4-3 with two out in the bottom of the eighth, but a dropped foul ball by catcher Sled Allen (which would have been the third out, if caught) was followed in the same at-bat by a booted ground ball by shortstop Pat Newnam which led to a run scoring. On the same play, a third out was made. The game was then immediately called on account of darkness at the end of eight innings with a 4-4 score, and as the game ended as a tie, Crouch was credited with no decision.

In Crouch's eight innings of work he gave up just three earned runs, and his brief MLB career ended with a 0–0 record and a 3.38 ERA.

Crouch's son, also named Bill Crouch, pitched in the majors between 1939 and 1945.
