= Jim Stephens =

American baseball player (1883-1965)

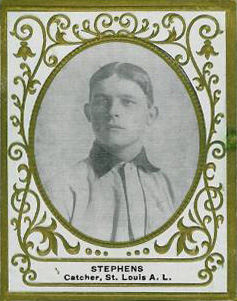
- Catcher
- Born: December 10, 1883; Salineville, Ohio, U.S.
- Died: January 2, 1965 (aged 81); Oxford, Alabama, U.S.
- Batted: Right Threw: Right

MLB debut
- April 11, 1907, for the St. Louis Browns

Last MLB appearance
- October 6, 1912, for the St. Louis Browns

MLB statistics
- Batting average: .220
- Home runs: 3
- Runs batted in: 97
- Stats at Baseball Reference

Teams
- St. Louis Browns (1907–1912)

James Walter Stephens (December 10, 1883 – January 2, 1965) was an American Major League Baseball catcher who played six seasons with the St. Louis Browns of the American League from 1907 to 1912. A weak hitter, he had a career .220 batting average, and hit three home runs in his career, all during the 1909 season. Mostly a backup in his career, he was a starter in both the 1910 and 1912 seasons.
