= Alex Malloy =

American baseball player (1886-1961)

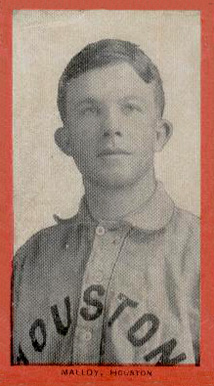
- Malloy with the Houston Buffaloes of the Texas League in 1910
- Pitcher
- Born: October 31, 1886; Laurinburg, North Carolina, U.S.
- Died: March 1, 1961 (aged 74); Ferris, Texas, U.S.
- Batted: Right Threw: Right

MLB debut
- September 10, 1910, for the St. Louis Browns

Last MLB appearance
- October 9, 1910, for the St. Louis Browns

MLB statistics
- Win–loss record: 0–6
- Earned run average: 2.56
- Strikeouts: 27
- Stats at Baseball Reference

Teams
- St. Louis Browns (1910)

Archibald Alexander Malloy (October 31, 1886 – March 1, 1961) was an American Major League Baseball pitcher who played with the St. Louis Browns in 1910.
