= Phil Stremmel =

American baseball player (1880–1947)

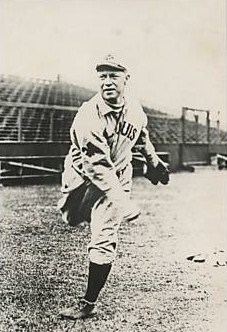
- Pitcher
- Born: April 16, 1880; Zanesville, Ohio, U.S.
- Died: December 26, 1947 (aged 67); Chicago, Illinois, U.S.
- Batted: Right Threw: Right

MLB debut
- September 16, 1909, for the St. Louis Browns

Last MLB appearance
- May 29, 1910, for the St. Louis Browns

MLB statistics
- Win–loss record: 0–4
- Earned run average: 4.02
- Strikeouts: 13
- Stats at Baseball Reference

Teams
- St. Louis Browns (1909–1910)

Philip Stremmel (April 16, 1880 – December 26, 1947) was an American professional baseball pitcher. Stremmel played for the St. Louis Browns in Major League Baseball in 1909 and 1910. In 7 career games, he had a 0-4 record, with a 4.02 ERA. He batted and threw right-handed.

Stremmel was born in Zanesville, Ohio and died in Chicago.
