= Joe McDonald (third baseman) =

American baseball player (1888-1963)

- Third baseman
- Born: April 9, 1888; Dent, Missouri, U.S.
- Died: May 30, 1963 (aged 75); Baytown, Texas, U.S.
- Batted: Right Threw: Right

MLB debut
- September 6, 1910, for the St. Louis Browns

Last MLB appearance
- September 14, 1910, for the St. Louis Browns

MLB statistics
- Batting average: .156
- Home runs: 0
- Runs batted in: 1
- Stats at Baseball Reference

Teams
- St. Louis Browns (1910)

Malcolm Joseph McDonald (April 9, 1888 – May 30, 1963) was an American Major League Baseball third baseman who played in 1910 with the St. Louis Browns.
