= Bert Graham =

American baseball player (1886-1971)

- First baseman / Second baseman
- Born: April 3, 1886; Tilton, Illinois, U.S.
- Died: June 19, 1971 (aged 85); Cottonwood, Arizona, U.S.
- Batted: Both Threw: Right

MLB debut
- September 9, 1910, for the St. Louis Browns

Last MLB appearance
- September 24, 1910, for the St. Louis Browns

MLB statistics
- Batting average: .115
- Home runs: 0
- Runs batted in: 5
- Stats at Baseball Reference

Teams
- St. Louis Browns (1910)

Bert Graham (April 3, 1886 – June 19, 1971), known by his initials "B. G.", was an American Major League Baseball first baseman and second baseman who played in eight games with the 1910 St. Louis Browns.
