= Ed Kinsella =

American baseball player (1880–1976)

- Pitcher
- Born: January 15, 1880; Lexington, Illinois, US
- Died: January 17, 1976 (aged 96); Bloomington, Illinois, US
- Batted: Right Threw: Right

MLB debut
- September 16, 1905, for the Pittsburgh Pirates

Last MLB appearance
- August 10, 1910, for the St. Louis Browns

MLB statistics
- Win–loss record: 1–4
- Earned run average: 3.49
- Strikeouts: 21
- Stats at Baseball Reference

Teams
- Pittsburgh Pirates (1905); St. Louis Browns (1910)

Edward William "Rube" Kinsella (January 15, 1880 – January 17, 1976) was an American pitcher in Major League Baseball for the Pittsburgh Pirates and St. Louis Browns. He stood at 6' 1" and weighed 175 lbs.

== Career ==
Kinsella was born in Lexington, Illinois, and attended Illinois State University. He pitched for the school's baseball team. He then started his professional baseball career in 1904 with the Bloomington Bloomers of the Illinois–Indiana–Iowa League. During his second season, he went 17–14 on the mound and was then purchased by the Pittsburgh Pirates. Kinsella made his major league debut in September and pitched 17 innings for the National League club during the final month of the campaign. He was the first player to make the major leagues from Illinois State University. In 1905, Kinsella was fired from his offseason job as a machinist when he took a day off to watch a baseball game.

Kinsella was purchased by Toledo of the American Association in December. The following March, the Toledo News-Bee reported that he was a "most likely looking young fellow." However, Kinsella did not pitch for Toledo that year, instead going to the Springfield Senators.

In 1906, Kinsella joined the Pacific Coast League's Portland Beavers. He made an immediate impact, winning 21 games with a 2.29 earned run average and leading the team in both categories. The following season, he pitched well again; he won 23 games and set a career-high with 380.2 innings pitched in the long Pacific Coast League schedule. Kinsella then went to the Northwestern League's Portland Colts for 1909. He won over 20 games for the third straight season and went 23–10.

Kinsella was purchased by the St. Louis Browns in August 1909 and had his second stint in the majors in 1910. In April, the Telegraph Herald reported that, "All who have seen Kinsella have been impressed by his work. Even the players bank on the big fellow when he goes to the mound..." Despite this praise, Kinsella appeared in just 10 games for the Browns. He went 1–3 with a below-average ERA, and he played his last major league game on August 10. The following season, he went back to the minors with the Western League's Denver Grizzlies and pitched for a pennant-winning team. The 1911 Grizzlies have been called the 22nd greatest minor league team of all-time.

In 1912, Kinsella went 22–11 for Denver. He moved up to the Pacific Coast League in 1913 but struggled and played part of 1914 in the Class D Central Association. That was his last year in organized baseball.

Kinsella finished his career with 144 minor league victories in 10 seasons but had only one major league win. He died in Bloomington, Illinois, two days after his 96th birthday.
