= Jack O'Connor (catcher) =

American baseball player (1866–1937)

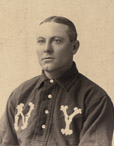
- O'Connor in 1903
- Catcher / Outfielder / First baseman / Player-manager
- Born: June 2, 1866; St. Louis, Missouri, U.S.
- Died: November 14, 1937 (aged 71); St. Louis, Missouri, U.S.
- Batted: Right Threw: Right

MLB debut
- April 20, 1887, for the Cincinnati Red Stockings

Last MLB appearance
- October 9, 1910, for the St. Louis Browns

MLB statistics
- Batting average: .263
- Hits: 1,418
- Home runs: 19
- Runs batted in: 738
- Stolen bases: 219
- Managerial record: 47–107–4
- Winning %: .305
- Stats at Baseball Reference

Teams
- As player: Cincinnati Red Stockings (1887–1888); Columbus Solons (1889–1891); Cleveland Spiders (1892–1898); St. Louis Perfectos/Cardinals (1899–1900); Pittsburgh Pirates (1900–1902); New York Highlanders (1903); St. Louis Browns (1904, 1906–1907, 1910); As manager: St. Louis Browns (1910)

John Joseph O'Connor (June 2, 1866 – November 14, 1937), also known as Peach Pie, was an American catcher, outfielder and first baseman in Major League Baseball in the American Association, the National League, and the American League, primarily used as a catcher. O'Connor appeared in games across four decades. He also was player-manager of the 1910 St. Louis Browns, finishing with a record of 47–107–4 (.305). O'Connor has the most career stolen bases (219) by a primary catcher in MLB history. (Note: A primary catcher is defined as a player who appeared at catcher in least 50% of their career games.)

O'Connor was involved in a scandal in 1910 when, as player-manager of the St. Louis Browns, he attempted to help Nap Lajoie win the batting title over Ty Cobb. O'Connor ordered a rookie third baseman to play in a position that allowed Lajoie to bunt and reach first base easily. Later, O'Connor and a coach tried to bribe the official scorer to change a call to a hit. Although Cobb won the title, the scandal led to an investigation, and O'Connor and the coach were fired and informally banned from baseball for life. Research in 1981 revealed that Cobb's statistics were incorrectly counted, and Lajoie should have won the batting title.

== Career ==
O'Connor began his career as a left fielder and catcher for the Cincinnati Red Stockings, and he soon moved his way around the infield. He also played for the Columbus Solons from 1889 to 1891, and in 1892, he joined the Cleveland Spiders, where he would stay until 1898, when the owners of the St. Louis Browns were buying their players from the Spiders, who ceased to exist in 1899. O'Connor moved west to play with the Perfectos until 10 games into the 1900 season, he was traded to the Pittsburgh Pirates. He played one season with the New York Highlanders before finishing his career back in St. Louis with the Browns. O'Connor is one of only 29 players in baseball history to date who have appeared in Major League games in four decades.

== Scandal ==
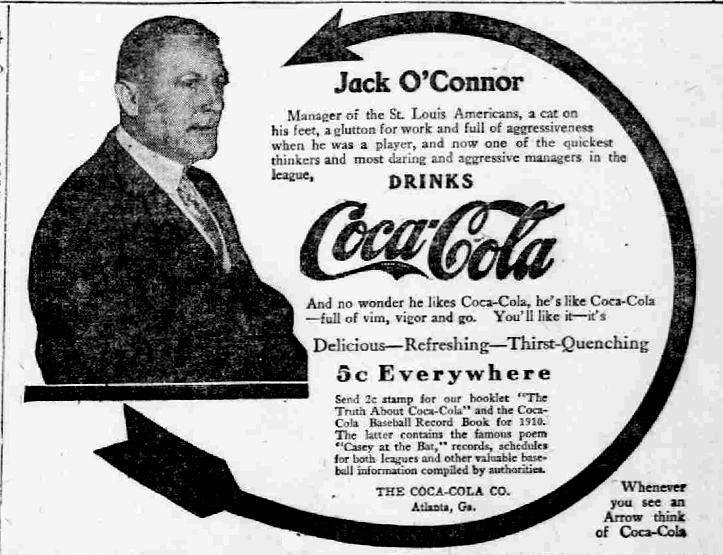
Jack O'Connor in a Coca-Cola ad from 1910, as manager of the St. Louis Browns

O'Connor was the player-manager of the Browns in 1910, finishing a dismal 47–107. He tried to help Nap Lajoie win the batting title and the associated 1910 Chalmers Award over Ty Cobb in the last two games of the season, a doubleheader at Sportsman's Park. Cobb was leading Lajoie .385 to .376 in the batting race going into that last day. O'Connor ordered rookie third baseman Red Corriden to station himself in shallow left field. Lajoie bunted five straight times down the third base line and made it to first easily. On his last at-bat, Lajoie reached base on a fielding error, officially giving him a hitless at-bat and lowering his average. O'Connor and coach Harry Howell tried to bribe the official scorer, a woman, to change the call to a hit, offering to buy her a new wardrobe. Cobb won the batting title by less than one percentage point over Lajoie, .385069 to .384095.

The resulting outcry triggered an investigation by American League president Ban Johnson, who declared Cobb the rightful winner of the batting title (though Chalmers awarded cars to both players). At his insistence, Browns' owner Robert Hedges fired both O'Connor and Howell and released them as players; both men were informally banned from baseball for life. O'Connor accepted responsibility for the scheme, but maintained that it was the players' idea; he didn't object because the game was not a factor in the pennant race. To date, it is the most severe penalty handed down to a manager for in-game misconduct. It is tied for the most severe penalty overall ever handed down to a manager; Pete Rose of the Cincinnati Reds was also banned for life for betting on baseball.

In 1981, however, research revealed that one game was counted twice for Cobb when he went 2-for-3. As a result, his 1910 batting statistics should have been shown as 194-for-506 and .383399, less than 0.0007 behind Lajoie at 227-for-591.

== Managerial record ==
Team	Year	Regular season					Postseason			
Team	Year	Games	Won	Lost	Win %	Finish	Won	Lost	Win %	Result
SLB	1910	154	47	107	.305	8th in AL	–	–	–	–
Total		154	47	107	.305		0	0	–	

== See also ==
- List of Major League Baseball career stolen bases leaders
- List of Major League Baseball players who played in four decades
