= Harry Howell (baseball) =

American baseball player (1876–1956)

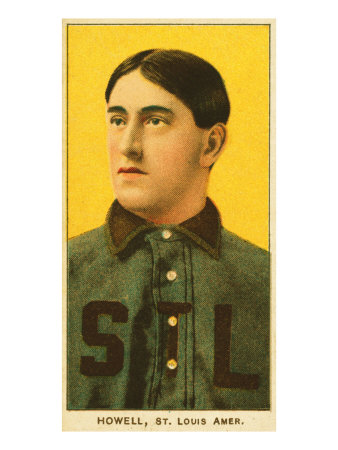
- Pitcher
- Born: November 14, 1876; Brooklyn, New York, U.S.
- Died: May 22, 1956 (aged 79); Spokane, Washington, U.S.
- Batted: Right Threw: Right

MLB debut
- October 10, 1898, for the Brooklyn Bridegrooms

Last MLB appearance
- May 14, 1910, for the St. Louis Browns

MLB statistics
- Win–loss record: 131–146
- Earned run average: 2.74
- Strikeouts: 986
- Stats at Baseball Reference

Teams
- Brooklyn Bridegrooms (1898); Baltimore Orioles (1899); Brooklyn Superbas (1900); Baltimore Orioles (1901–1902); New York Highlanders (1903); St. Louis Browns (1904–1910)

Harry Taylor Howell (November 14, 1876 – May 22, 1956) was an American professional baseball player who played as a pitcher for the Brooklyn Bridegrooms/Brooklyn Superbas (1898 and 1900), Baltimore Orioles (1899), Baltimore Orioles/New York Highlanders (1901–03), and St. Louis Browns (1904–10).

== Career ==
Howell helped the Superbas win the 1900 National League pennant. He led the National League in games finished (non-starts) in 1900 (10) and the American League in 1903 (10) and led the American League in Complete Games (35) in 1905. Howell currently ranks 82nd on the MLB All-Time ERA List (2.74), 87th on the All-Time Complete Games List (244) and 68th on the Hit Batsmen List (97). He is also the Baltimore Orioles career leader in ERA (2.06).

In 13 seasons, he had a 131–146 Win–loss record, 340 Games (282 Started), 244 Complete Games, 20 Shutouts, 53 Games Finished, 6 Saves, 2,567 2/3 Innings Pitched, 2,435 Hits Allowed, 1,158 Runs Allowed, 781 Earned Runs Allowed, 27 Home Runs Allowed, 677 Walks, 986 Strikeouts, 97 Hit Batsmen, 53 Wild Pitches, 7,244 Batters Faced, 1 Balk, 2.74 ERA and a 1.212 WHIP.

After his playing career ended, he was an umpire for 85 games in the Federal League in 1915.

=== 1910 Chalmers Award Scandal ===
Howell, along with the Jack O'Connor, the Browns player-manager, was involved in the scandal surrounding efforts to help Cleveland's Nap Lajoie win the batting title and the associated 1910 Chalmers Award over Ty Cobb in the last two games of the season, a doubleheader at Sportsman's Park. Cobb was leading Lajoie .385 to .376 in the batting race going into that last day. O'Connor ordered rookie third baseman Red Corriden to station himself in shallow left field to allow what otherwise would be routine infield ground outs to be base hits. Lajoie bunted five straight times down the third base line and made it to first easily. On his last at-bat, Lajoie reached base on a fielding error, officially giving him a hitless at-bat and lowering his average. O'Connor and Howell tried to bribe the official scorer, a woman, to change the call to a hit, offering to buy her a new wardrobe. Cobb won the batting title by less than one point over Lajoie, .385069 to .384095. The resulting outcry triggered an investigation by American League president Ban Johnson, who declared Cobb the rightful winner of the batting title (though Chalmers awarded cars to both players). At his insistence, Browns' owner Robert Hedges fired both O'Connor and Howell, and released them as players; both men were informally banned from baseball for life.

In 1981, however, research revealed that one game was counted twice for Cobb when he went 2-for-3. As a result, his 1910 batting statistics should have been shown as 194-for-506 and .383399, less than .0007 behind Lajoie at 227-for-591.

== See also ==
- List of Major League Baseball career hit batsmen leaders
- 1910 Chalmers Award
