= Dode Criss =

American baseball player (1885–1955)

- Pitcher / First baseman
- Born: March 12, 1885; Sherman, Mississippi, U.S.
- Died: September 8, 1955 (aged 70); Sherman, Mississippi, U.S.
- Batted: Left Threw: Right

MLB debut
- April 20, 1908, for the St. Louis Browns

Last MLB appearance
- August 25, 1911, for the St. Louis Browns

MLB statistics
- Batting average: .276
- Home runs: 3
- Runs batted in: 47
- Stats at Baseball Reference

Teams
- St. Louis Browns (1908–1911)

Dode Criss (March 12, 1885 – September 8, 1955) was an American right-handed Major League Baseball pitcher and pinch hitter who played his entire career from 1908 to 1911 with the St. Louis Browns of the American League. He is considered by historian Bill James as the first player to be used as a pinch hitter regularly.

Criss was born in Sherman, Mississippi. Criss started out in the Texas League where he was a key player for the Cleburne Railroaders championship team in 1906. On June 28 of that season, Criss pitched a no-hitter against the Temple Boll Weevils. Criss signed with the Browns in the beginning of the 1908 season, where his father told Criss not to sign for them for less than a dollar a day. In his first season on the big leagues, Criss became the first player to pinch hit at least 40 times in a season, with 41 out of 82 at-bats, making 12 pinch hits, (28 overall) for a .341 batting average, higher than the league leader, Ty Cobb.

A minor controversy ensued as St. Louis fans were outraged that the then Commissioner of Baseball, Ban Johnson, declared Cobb as the batting average winner instead of Criss. He led the American League in pinch at-bats and hits in every season of his four-year career. After his career with the Browns, Criss went back to the Texas League, where he led the league in batting three times, and pitched three no-hitters for Houston.

Overall, Criss played in 227 games, getting 304 at-bats with 84 hits, for a .276 lifetime average. Pitching wise, Criss had three wins and nine losses in his career with a 4.38 earned run average and 70 strikeouts.

Criss died in Sherman in 1955. He is a member of the Texas League Hall of Fame.
