= Pat Newnam =

American baseball player (1880-1938)

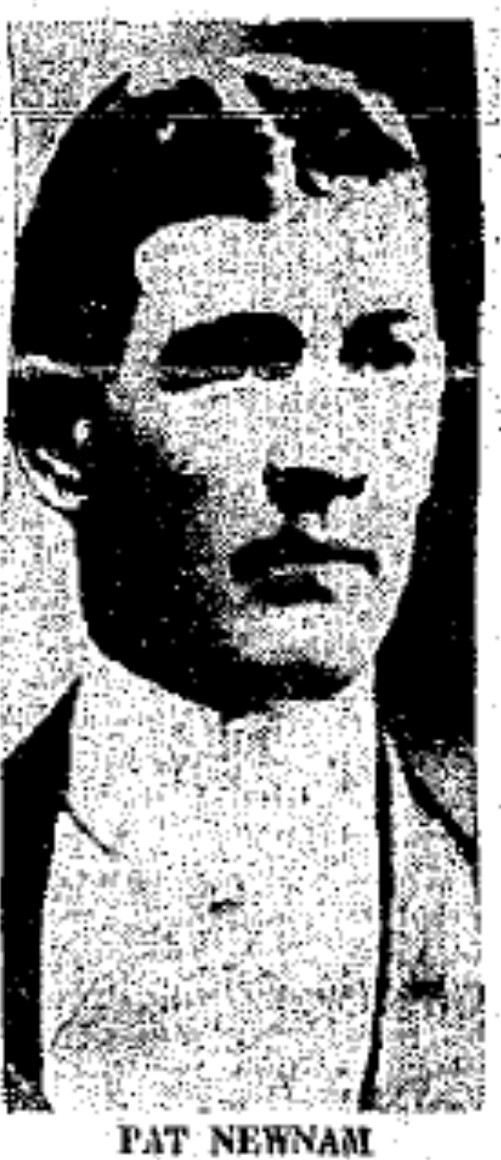
- First baseman
- Born: December 10, 1880; Hempstead, Texas, U.S.
- Died: June 20, 1938 (aged 57); San Antonio, Texas, U.S.
- Batted: Left Threw: Right

MLB debut
- May 29, 1910, for the St. Louis Browns

Last MLB appearance
- May 13, 1911, for the St. Louis Browns

MLB statistics
- Batting average: .213
- Home runs: 2
- Runs batted in: 31
- Stats at Baseball Reference

Teams
- St. Louis Browns (1910–1911)

Robert Albert "Pat" Newnam (December 10, 1880 – June 20, 1938) was an American Major League Baseball first baseman who played in 1910 and 1911 with the St. Louis Browns.
