= Joe Crisp =

American baseball player (1885-1939)

- Catcher
- Born: July 8, 1885; Higginsville, Missouri, U.S.
- Died: February 5, 1939 (aged 53); Kansas City, Missouri, U.S.
- Batted: Right Threw: Right

MLB debut
- September 2, 1910, for the St. Louis Browns

Last MLB appearance
- April 27, 1911, for the St. Louis Browns

MLB statistics
- Games played: 2
- At bats: 2
- Hits: 1
- Stats at Baseball Reference

Teams
- St. Louis Browns (1910–1911)

Joseph Shelby Crisp (July 8, 1885 – February 5, 1939) was an American catcher in Major League Baseball. He played for the St. Louis Browns.
