= Al Schweitzer =

American baseball player (1882-1969)

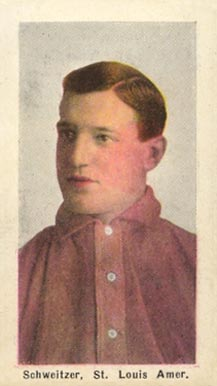
- Outfielder
- Born: December 23, 1882; Cleveland, Ohio, U.S.
- Died: January 27, 1969 (aged 86); Newark, Ohio, U.S.
- Batted: Right Threw: Right

MLB debut
- April 30, 1908, for the St. Louis Browns

Last MLB appearance
- October 8, 1911, for the St. Louis Browns

MLB statistics
- Batting average: .238
- Home runs: 3
- Runs batted in: 87
- Stats at Baseball Reference

Teams
- St. Louis Browns (1908–1911)

Albert Casper Schweitzer (December 23, 1882 – January 27, 1969) was an American outfielder in Major League Baseball. Nicknamed "Cheese", he played for the St. Louis Browns.
