= Red Nelson (baseball) =

American baseball player (1886–1956)

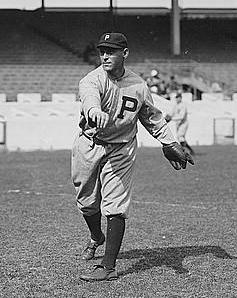
- Pitcher
- Born: May 19, 1886; Cleveland, Florida, U.S.
- Died: October 26, 1956 (aged 70); St. Petersburg, Florida, U.S.
- Batted: Right Threw: Right

MLB debut
- September 9, 1910, for the St. Louis Browns

Last MLB appearance
- June 9, 1913, for the Cincinnati Reds

MLB statistics
- Win–loss record: 10–12
- Earned run average: 4.54
- Strikeouts: 68
- Stats at Baseball Reference

Teams
- St. Louis Browns (1910–1912); Philadelphia Phillies (1912–1913); Cincinnati Reds (1913)

Albert Francis "Red" Nelson (May 19, 1886 – October 26, 1956) was an American pitcher in Major League Baseball. He played for the St. Louis Browns, Philadelphia Phillies, and Cincinnati Reds.
