= Roy Mitchell (baseball) =

American baseball player (1885–1959)

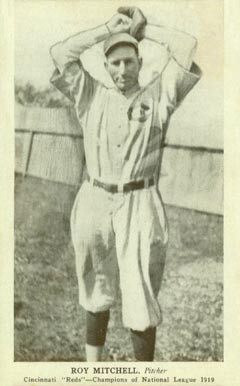
- Pitcher
- Born: April 19, 1885; Belton, Texas, U.S.
- Died: September 8, 1959 (aged 74); Temple, Texas, U.S.
- Batted: Right Threw: Right

MLB debut
- September 10, 1910, for the St. Louis Browns

Last MLB appearance
- July 14, 1919, for the Cincinnati Reds

MLB statistics
- Win–loss record: 32–37
- Earned run average: 3.42
- Strikeouts: 204
- Stats at Baseball Reference

Teams
- St. Louis Browns (1910–1914); Chicago White Sox (1918); Cincinnati Reds (1918–1919)

Albert Roy Mitchell (April 19, 1885 – September 8, 1959) was an American professional baseball player. He was a right-handed pitcher over parts of seven seasons (1910–1914, 1918–1919) with the St. Louis Browns, Chicago White Sox and Cincinnati Reds. For his career, he compiled a 32–37 record in 122 appearances, with a 3.42 earned run average and 204 strikeouts. Mitchell was a member of the 1919 World Series champion Cincinnati Reds, though he did not play in the World Series.

He was born in Belton, Texas and later died in Temple, Texas at the age of 74.

== See also ==
- List of Major League Baseball annual saves leaders
