= 1910 Major League Baseball season =

1910 MLB season
- League: American League (AL); National League (NL)
- Sport: Baseball
- Duration: Regular season: April 14 – October 9, 1910 (AL); April 14 – October 15, 1910 (NL); World Series: October 17–23, 1910
- Games: 154
- Teams: 16 (8 per league)

Pennant winners
- AL champions: Philadelphia Athletics
- AL runners-up: New York Highlanders
- NL champions: Chicago Cubs
- NL runners-up: New York Giants

World Series
- Champions: Philadelphia Athletics
- Runners-up: Chicago Cubs

MLB seasons
- ← 1909 1911 →

Locations of teams for the 1910 American League season
American League
Locations of teams for the 1909–1910 National League seasons
National League

The 1910 major league baseball season began on April 14, 1910. The regular season ended on October 15, with the Chicago Cubs and Philadelphia Athletics as the regular season champions of the National League and American League, respectively. The postseason began with Game 1 of the seventh modern World Series on October 17 and ended with Game 5 on October 23. The Athletics defeated the Cubs, four games to one, capturing their first championship in franchise history. Going into the season, the defending World Series champions were the Pittsburgh Pirates from the 1909 season.

== Schedule ==
The 1910 schedule consisted of 154 games for all teams in the American League and National League, each of which had eight teams. Each team was scheduled to play 22 games against the other seven teams of their respective league. This continued the format put in place for the 1904 season. This format would last until 1919.

For the first time, Opening Day, which took place on April 14, featured all sixteen teams. The American League would see its final day of the regular season on October 9, while the National League would see its final day of the regular season was on October 15. The World Series took place between October 17 and October 23.

== Rule changes ==
The 1910 season saw the following rule changes:

- The league addressed double and triple steal attempts. Under the new rule, when any runner is thrown out, and the other(s) are successful, the successful runners will not be credited with a stolen base.
- The National League adopted a roster rule similar to the American League. Active rosters were set at 25 players, though this was dated May 10 through August 10, unlike the AL's May through August 20.
- A waiver rule was reverted so that if a player were to be claimed on waivers, his team could withdraw him and not send him to the claiming club.

== Teams ==
An asterisk (*) denotes the ballpark a team played the minority of their home games at

League	Team	City	Ballpark	Capacity	Manager
American League	Boston Red Sox	Boston, Massachusetts	Huntington Avenue Grounds	11,500	Patsy Donovan
American League	Chicago White Sox	Chicago, Illinois	South Side Park*	15,000*	Hugh Duffy
American League	Chicago White Sox	Chicago, Illinois	White Sox Park	28,000	Hugh Duffy
American League	Cleveland Naps	Cleveland, Ohio	League Park (Cleveland)	21,414	Deacon McGuire
American League	Detroit Tigers	Detroit, Michigan	Bennett Park	14,000	Hughie Jennings
American League	New York Highlanders	New York, New York	Hilltop Park	16,000	George Stallings
American League	New York Highlanders	New York, New York	Hilltop Park	16,000	Hal Chase
American League	Philadelphia Athletics	Philadelphia, Pennsylvania	Shibe Park	23,000	Connie Mack
American League	St. Louis Browns	St. Louis, Missouri	Sportsman's Park	18,000	Jack O'Connor
American League	Washington Senators	Washington, D.C.	National Park	9,000	Jimmy McAleer
National League	Boston Doves	Boston, Massachusetts	South End Grounds	9,800	Fred Lake
National League	Brooklyn Superbas	New York, New York	Washington Park	14,000	Bill Dahlen
National League	Chicago Cubs	Chicago, Illinois	West Side Park	16,000	Frank Chance
National League	Cincinnati Reds	Cincinnati, Ohio	Palace of the Fans	12,000	Clark Griffith
National League	New York Giants	New York, New York	Polo Grounds	16,000	John McGraw
National League	Philadelphia Phillies	Philadelphia, Pennsylvania	National League Park	18,000	Red Dooin
National League	Pittsburgh Pirates	Pittsburgh, Pennsylvania	Forbes Field	23,000	Fred Clarke
National League	St. Louis Cardinals	St. Louis, Missouri	League Park (St. Louis)	21,000	Roger Bresnahan

== Standings ==
=== American League ===
American League
Team	W	L	Pct.	GB	Home	Road
Philadelphia Athletics	102	48	.680	—	57‍–‍19	45‍–‍29
New York Highlanders	88	63	.583	14½	49‍–‍25	39‍–‍38
Detroit Tigers	86	68	.558	18	46‍–‍31	40‍–‍37
Boston Red Sox	81	72	.529	22½	51‍–‍28	30‍–‍44
Cleveland Naps	71	81	.467	32	39‍–‍36	32‍–‍45
Chicago White Sox	68	85	.444	35½	41‍–‍37	27‍–‍48
Washington Senators	66	85	.437	36½	38‍–‍35	28‍–‍50
St. Louis Browns	47	107	.305	57	26‍–‍51	21‍–‍56

=== National League ===
National League
Team	W	L	Pct.	GB	Home	Road
Chicago Cubs	104	50	.675	—	58‍–‍19	46‍–‍31
New York Giants	91	63	.591	13	52‍–‍26	39‍–‍37
Pittsburgh Pirates	86	67	.562	17½	46‍–‍30	40‍–‍37
Philadelphia Phillies	78	75	.510	25½	40‍–‍36	38‍–‍39
Cincinnati Reds	75	79	.487	29	39‍–‍37	36‍–‍42
Brooklyn Superbas	64	90	.416	40	39‍–‍39	25‍–‍51
St. Louis Cardinals	63	90	.412	40½	35‍–‍41	28‍–‍49
Boston Doves	53	100	.346	50½	29‍–‍48	24‍–‍52

=== Tie games ===
26 tie games (19 in AL, 7 in NL), which are not factored into winning percentage or games behind (and were often replayed again), occurred throughout the season.

==== American League ====
- Boston Red Sox, 5
- Chicago White Sox, 3
- Cleveland Naps, 9
- Detroit Tigers, 1
- New York Highlanders, 5
- Philadelphia Athletics, 5
- St. Louis Browns, 4
- Washington Senators, 6

==== National League ====
- Boston Doves, 4
- Brooklyn Superbas, 2
- Cincinnati Reds, 2
- New York Giants, 1
- Philadelphia Phillies, 4
- Pittsburgh Pirates, 1

== Postseason ==
The postseason began on October 17 and ended on October 23 with the Philadelphia Athletics defeating the Chicago Cubs in the 1910 World Series in five games.

=== Bracket ===
World Series
AL	Philadelphia Athletics	4
NL	Chicago Cubs	1

== Managerial changes ==
=== Off-season ===
Team	Former Manager	New Manager
Boston Doves	Frank Bowerman	Fred Lake
Boston Red Sox	Fred Lake	Patsy Donovan
Brooklyn Superbas	Harry Lumley	Bill Dahlen
Chicago White Sox	Billy Sullivan	Hugh Duffy
Philadelphia Phillies	Billy Murray	Red Dooin
St. Louis Browns	Jimmy McAleer	Jack O'Connor
Washington Senators	Joe Cantillon	Jimmy McAleer

=== In-season ===
Team	Former Manager	New Manager
New York Highlanders	George Stallings	Hal Chase

== League leaders ==
=== American League ===
Hitting leaders
Stat	Player	Total
AVG	Nap Lajoie (CLE)	.383
OPS	Ty Cobb (DET)	1.004
HR	Jake Stahl (BOS)	10
RBI	Sam Crawford (DET)	120
R	Ty Cobb (DET)	106
H	Nap Lajoie (CLE)	227
SB	Eddie Collins (PHA)	81

Pitching leaders
Stat	Player	Total
W	Jack Coombs (PHA)	31
L	Ed Walsh (CWS)	20
ERA	Ed Walsh (CWS)	1.27
K	Walter Johnson (WSH)	313
IP	Walter Johnson (WSH)	370.0
SV	Ed Walsh (CWS)	5
WHIP	Ed Walsh (CWS)	0.820

=== National League ===
Hitting leaders
Stat	Player	Total
AVG	Sherry Magee (PHI)	.331
OPS	Sherry Magee (PHI)	.952
HR	Fred Beck (BSN); Frank Schulte (CHC)	10
RBI	Sherry Magee (PHI)	123
R	Sherry Magee (PHI)	110
H	Bobby Byrne (PIT); Honus Wagner (PIT)	178
SB	Bob Bescher (CIN)	70

Pitching leaders
Stat	Player	Total
W	Christy Mathewson (NYG)	27
L	George Bell (BRO)	27
ERA	King Cole (CHC)	1.80
K	Earl Moore (PHI)	185
IP	Nap Rucker (BRO)	320.1
SV	Mordecai Brown (CHC); Harry Gaspar (CIN)	7
WHIP	Mordecai Brown (CHC)	1.084

== Milestones ==
=== Batters ===
==== Cycles ====
- Chief Wilson (PIT):
  - Wilson hit for his first cycle and fourth in franchise history, on July 3 against the Cincinnati Reds.
- Danny Murphy (PHA):
  - Murphy hit for his first cycle and second in franchise history, on August 25 against the St. Louis Browns.
- Bill Collins (BSN):
  - Collins hit for his first cycle, third in franchise history, and second natural cycle in major league history, on October 6 against the Philadelphia Phillies.

=== Pitchers ===
==== No-hitters ====
- Addie Joss (CLE):
  - Joss threw his second career no-hitter and the third no-hitter in franchise history, by defeating the Chicago White Sox 1–0 on April 20. Joss walked two and struck out two.
- Chief Bender (PHA):
  - Bender threw his first career no-hitter and the second no-hitter in franchise history, by defeating the Cleveland Naps 4–0 on May 12. Bender walked one and struck out four.

==== Other pitching accomplishments ====
- Cy Young (CLE):
  - Recorded his 500th career win on July 18 against the Washington Senators. He became the only player to ever reach this mark.

=== Miscellaneous ===
- St. Louis Cardinals / Cincinnati Reds:
  - Set a Major League record for most combined walks in a single game at 23, with the St. Louis Cardinals walking 16 batters and the Cincinnati Reds Blues walking 7, on May 4 in a game that St. Louis won 12–3.

== Awards and honors ==
- Chalmers Award: Ty Cobb (DET); Nap Lajoie (CLE)

== Home field attendance ==
Team name	Wins	%±	Home attendance	%±	Per game
Philadelphia Athletics	102	7.4%	588,905	-12.7%	7,550
Boston Red Sox	81	-8.0%	584,619	-12.6%	7,308
Chicago White Sox	68	-12.8%	552,084	15.4%	6,988
Chicago Cubs	104	0.0%	526,152	-16.9%	6,833
New York Giants	91	-1.1%	511,785	-34.7%	6,478
Pittsburgh Pirates	86	-21.8%	436,586	-18.4%	5,745
Detroit Tigers	86	-12.2%	391,288	-20.2%	5,017
Cincinnati Reds	75	-2.6%	380,622	-10.4%	4,943
New York Highlanders	88	18.9%	355,857	-29.0%	4,622
St. Louis Cardinals	63	16.7%	355,668	18.6%	4,680
Philadelphia Phillies	78	5.4%	296,597	-2.2%	3,803
Cleveland Naps	71	0.0%	293,456	-17.2%	3,668
Brooklyn Superbas	64	16.4%	279,321	-13.1%	3,492
Washington Senators	66	57.1%	254,591	24.1%	3,306
St. Louis Browns	47	-23.0%	249,889	-31.8%	3,163
Boston Doves	53	17.8%	149,027	-23.6%	1,911

== Venues ==
The Washington Senators would play their last games at the original National Park with a doubleheader on October 6 against the Boston Red Sox. The park burned down in March 1911 and the Senators moved into a new National Park for the start of the 1911 season.

The Chicago White Sox would play their last game at South Side Park on June 27, having played ten seasons there going back to their inaugural 1901 season, and opened White Sox Park on July 1, where they would go on to play for 81 seasons through 1990.

== See also ==
- 1910 in baseball (Events, Births, Deaths)
