= 1910 Detroit Tigers season =

Major League Baseball season

1910 Detroit Tigers
- League: American League
- Ballpark: Bennett Park
- City: Detroit, Michigan
- Record: 86–68 (.558)
- League place: 3rd
- Owners: William H. Yawkey and Frank Navin
- Managers: Hughie Jennings

The 1910 Detroit Tigers season was a season in American baseball. The Tigers finished third in the American League with a record of 86–68, 18 games behind the Philadelphia Athletics.

== Regular season ==
=== Season standings ===
American League
Team	W	L	Pct.	GB	Home	Road
Philadelphia Athletics	102	48	.680	—	57‍–‍19	45‍–‍29
New York Highlanders	88	63	.583	14½	49‍–‍25	39‍–‍38
Detroit Tigers	86	68	.558	18	46‍–‍31	40‍–‍37
Boston Red Sox	81	72	.529	22½	51‍–‍28	30‍–‍44
Cleveland Naps	71	81	.467	32	39‍–‍36	32‍–‍45
Chicago White Sox	68	85	.444	35½	41‍–‍37	27‍–‍48
Washington Senators	66	85	.437	36½	38‍–‍35	28‍–‍50
St. Louis Browns	47	107	.305	57	26‍–‍51	21‍–‍56

=== Record vs. opponents ===
1910 American League record Sources:
Team	BOS	CWS	CLE	DET	NYH	PHA	SLB	WSH
Boston	—	10–12	14–8–3	12–10	9–13–1	4–18	16–6	16–5–1
Chicago	12–10	—	10–12	9–13	8–13–2	8–14–1	12–10	9–13
Cleveland	8–14–3	12–10	—	9–13	8–13	7–14–4	18–4–1	9–13–1
Detroit	10–12	13–9	13–9	—	13–9	9–13	15–7	13–9–1
New York	13–9–1	13–8–2	13–8	9–13	—	9–12	16–6–1	15–7–1
Philadelphia	18–4	14–8–1	14–7–4	13–9	12–9	—	17–5	14–6
St. Louis	6–16	10–12	4–18–1	7–15	6–16–1	5–17	—	9–13–2
Washington	5–16–1	13–9	13–9–1	9–13–1	7–15–1	6–14	13–9–2	—

=== Roster ===
1910 Detroit Tigers
Roster
Pitchers: Frank Browning; Bill Donovan; Ed Killian; Bill Lelivelt; Art Loudell; George Mullin; Marv Peasley; Hub Pernoll; Dave Skeels; Sailor Stroud; Ed Summers; Ed Willett; Ralph Works	Catchers: Heinie Beckendorf; Joe Casey; Boss Schmidt; Oscar Stanage; Infielders: Donie Bush; Jim Delahanty; Tom Jones; Jay Kirke; Chick Lathers; George Moriarty; Charley O'Leary; Hack Simmons	Outfielders: Ty Cobb; Sam Crawford; Davy Jones; Matty McIntyre	Manager: Hughie Jennings

== Player stats ==
=== Batting ===
==== Starters by position ====
Note: Pos = Position; G = Games played; AB = At bats; H = Hits; Avg. = Batting average; HR = Home runs; RBI = Runs batted in

Pos	Player	G	AB	H	Avg.	HR	RBI
C	Oscar Stanage	88	275	57	.207	2	25
1B	Tom Jones	135	432	110	.255	1	45
2B	Jim Delahanty	106	378	111	.294	3	45
SS	Donie Bush	142	496	130	.262	3	34
3B	George Moriarty	136	490	123	.251	2	60
OF	Sam Crawford	154	588	170	.289	5	120
OF	Ty Cobb	140	506	194	.383	8	91
OF	Davy Jones	113	377	100	.265	0	24

==== Other batters ====
Note: G = Games played; AB = At bats; H = Hits; Avg. = Batting average; HR = Home runs; RBI = Runs batted in

Player	G	AB	H	Avg.	HR	RBI
Matty McIntyre	83	305	72	.236	0	25
Charley O'Leary	65	211	51	.242	0	9
Boss Schmidt	71	197	51	.259	1	23
Hack Simmons	42	110	25	.227	0	9
Joe Casey	23	62	12	.194	0	2
Jay Kirke	8	25	5	.200	0	3
Heinie Beckendorf	3	7	3	.429	0	2
Hughie Jennings	1	0	0	----	0	0

=== Pitching ===
==== Starting pitchers ====
Note: G = Games pitched; IP = Innings pitched; W = Wins; L = Losses; ERA = Earned run average; SO = Strikeouts

Player	G	IP	W	L	ERA	SO
George Mullin	38	289.0	21	12	2.87	98
Ed Willett	37	224.1	16	11	2.37	65
Ed Summers	30	220.1	13	12	2.53	82
Bill Donovan	26	206.2	17	7	2.44	107
Ed Killian	11	74.0	4	3	3.04	20
Bill Lelivelt	1	9.0	0	1	1.00	2
Dave Skeels	1	6.0	0	0	12.00	2

==== Other pitchers ====
Note: G = Games pitched; IP = Innings pitched; W = Wins; L = Losses; ERA = Earned run average; SO = Strikeouts

Player	G	IP	W	L	ERA	SO
Sailor Stroud	28	130.1	5	9	3.25	63
Ralph Works	18	85.2	3	6	3.57	36
Hub Pernoll	11	54.2	4	3	2.96	25
Frank Browning	11	49.0	2	2	2.57	16
Art Loudell	5	21.1	1	1	3.38	12
Marv Peasley	2	10.0	0	1	8.10	4
