= 1910 Chicago White Sox season =

1910 Chicago White Sox
- League: American League
- Ballpark: South Side Park; White Sox Park
- City: Chicago, Illinois
- Record: 68–85 (.444)
- League place: 6th
- Owners: Charles Comiskey
- Managers: Hugh Duffy

the 1910 Chicago White Sox set the modern (since 1901) major league record for batting futility with a .211 team batting average. No White Sox regular hit above .250, Patsy Dougherty led all regulars with a .248 batting average. On July 1st, the team moved from South Side Park to White Sox Park, which would be the team's home for the next 80 years.

== Regular season ==
=== Season standings ===
American League
Team	W	L	Pct.	GB	Home	Road
Philadelphia Athletics	102	48	.680	—	57‍–‍19	45‍–‍29
New York Highlanders	88	63	.583	14½	49‍–‍25	39‍–‍38
Detroit Tigers	86	68	.558	18	46‍–‍31	40‍–‍37
Boston Red Sox	81	72	.529	22½	51‍–‍28	30‍–‍44
Cleveland Naps	71	81	.467	32	39‍–‍36	32‍–‍45
Chicago White Sox	68	85	.444	35½	41‍–‍37	27‍–‍48
Washington Senators	66	85	.437	36½	38‍–‍35	28‍–‍50
St. Louis Browns	47	107	.305	57	26‍–‍51	21‍–‍56

=== Record vs. opponents ===
1910 American League record Sources:
Team	BOS	CWS	CLE	DET	NYH	PHA	SLB	WSH
Boston	—	10–12	14–8–3	12–10	9–13–1	4–18	16–6	16–5–1
Chicago	12–10	—	10–12	9–13	8–13–2	8–14–1	12–10	9–13
Cleveland	8–14–3	12–10	—	9–13	8–13	7–14–4	18–4–1	9–13–1
Detroit	10–12	13–9	13–9	—	13–9	9–13	15–7	13–9–1
New York	13–9–1	13–8–2	13–8	9–13	—	9–12	16–6–1	15–7–1
Philadelphia	18–4	14–8–1	14–7–4	13–9	12–9	—	17–5	14–6
St. Louis	6–16	10–12	4–18–1	7–15	6–16–1	5–17	—	9–13–2
Washington	5–16–1	13–9	13–9–1	9–13–1	7–15–1	6–14	13–9–2	—

=== Roster ===
1910 Chicago White Sox
Roster
Pitchers: Bill Burns; Chief Chouneau; Frank Lange; Fred Olmstead; Jim Scott; Frank Smith; Ed Walsh; Doc White; Irv Young	Catchers: Bruno Block; Fred Payne; Billy Sullivan; Infielders: Lena Blackburne; Charlie French; Chick Gandil; Harry Lord; Amby McConnell; Charlie Mullen; Billy Purtell; Lee Tannehill; Rollie Zeider	Outfielders: Cuke Barrows; Red Bowser; George Browne; Felix Chouinard; Willis Cole; Shano Collins; Patsy Dougherty; Ed Hahn; Red Kelly; Paul Meloan; Bobby Messenger; Freddy Parent; Dutch Zwilling	Manager: Hugh Duffy

== Player stats ==
=== Batting ===
==== Starters by position ====
Note: Pos = Position; G = Games played; AB = At bats; H = Hits; Avg. = Batting average; HR = Home runs; RBI = Runs batted in

Pos	Player	G	AB	H	Avg.	HR	RBI
C	Fred Payne	91	252	56	.222	0	19
1B	Chick Gandil	77	275	53	.193	2	21
2B	Rollie Zeider	136	498	108	.217	0	31
SS	Lena Blackburne	75	242	42	.174	0	10
3B	Billy Purtell	102	368	82	.223	1	36
OF	Paul Meloan	65	222	54	.243	0	23
OF	Patsy Dougherty	127	443	110	.248	1	43
OF	Freddy Parent	81	258	46	.178	1	16

==== Other batters ====
Note: G = Games played; AB = At bats; H = Hits; Avg. = Batting average; HR = Home runs; RBI = Runs batted in

Player	G	AB	H	Avg.	HR	RBI
Shano Collins	97	315	62	.197	1	24
Lee Tannehill	67	230	51	.222	1	21
Charlie French	45	170	28	.165	0	4
Harry Lord	44	165	49	.297	0	10
Bruno Block	55	152	32	.211	0	9
Billy Sullivan	45	142	26	.183	0	6
Charlie Mullen	41	123	24	.195	0	13
Amby McConnell	33	120	33	.275	0	5
George Browne	30	112	27	.241	0	4
Dutch Zwilling	27	87	16	.184	0	5
Felix Chouinard	24	82	16	.195	0	9
Willis Cole	22	80	14	.175	0	2
Ed Hahn	15	53	6	.113	0	1
Red Kelly	14	45	7	.156	0	1
Bobby Messenger	9	26	6	.231	0	4
Cuke Barrows	6	20	4	.200	0	1
Red Bowser	1	2	0	.000	0	0

=== Pitching ===
==== Starting pitchers ====
Note: G = Games pitched; IP = Innings pitched; W = Wins; L = Losses; ERA = Earned run average; SO = Strikeouts

Player	G	IP	W	L	ERA	SO
Ed Walsh	45	369.2	18	20	1.27	258
Doc White	33	236.2	15	13	2.66	111
Frank Smith	19	128.2	4	9	2.03	50
Chief Chouneau	1	5.1	0	1	3.38	1

==== Other pitchers ====
Note: G = Games pitched; IP = Innings pitched; W = Wins; L = Losses; ERA = Earned run average; SO = Strikeouts

Player	G	IP	W	L	ERA	SO
Jim Scott	41	229.2	8	18	2.43	135
Fred Olmstead	32	184.1	10	12	1.95	68
Irv Young	27	135.2	4	8	2.72	64
Frank Lange	23	130.2	9	4	1.65	98

==== Relief pitchers ====
Note: G = Games pitched; W = Wins; L = Losses; SV = Saves; ERA = Earned run average; SO = Strikeouts

Player	G	W	L	SV	ERA	SO
Bill Burns	1	0	0	0	0.00	0
