= 1909 Chicago White Sox season =

1909 Chicago White Sox
- League: American League
- Ballpark: South Side Park
- City: Chicago, Illinois
- Record: 78–74 (.513)
- League place: 4th
- Owners: Charles Comiskey
- Managers: Billy Sullivan

The 1909 Chicago White Sox season was the franchise's ninth season in Major League Baseball. The White Sox finished fourth in the American League with a record of 78 wins and 74 losses.

== Regular season ==
=== Season standings ===
American League
Team	W	L	Pct.	GB	Home	Road
Detroit Tigers	98	54	.645	—	57‍–‍19	41‍–‍35
Philadelphia Athletics	95	58	.621	3½	49‍–‍27	46‍–‍31
Boston Red Sox	88	63	.583	9½	47‍–‍28	41‍–‍35
Chicago White Sox	78	74	.513	20	42‍–‍34	36‍–‍40
New York Highlanders	74	77	.490	23½	41‍–‍35	33‍–‍42
Cleveland Naps	71	82	.464	27½	39‍–‍37	32‍–‍45
St. Louis Browns	61	89	.407	36	40‍–‍37	21‍–‍52
Washington Senators	42	110	.276	56	27‍–‍48	15‍–‍62

=== Record vs. opponents ===
1909 American League record Sources:
Team	BOS	CWS	CLE	DET	NYH	PHA	SLB	WSH
Boston	—	13–9–1	14–8	9–13	13–9	10–11	13–7	16–6
Chicago	9–13–1	—	8–13–1	6–15–2	14–8–1	12–10	10–12–1	19–3–1
Cleveland	8–14	13–8–1	—	8–14–1	8–14	9–13	14–8	11–11
Detroit	13–9	15–6–2	14–8–1	—	14–8	8–14	18–3–1	16–6–2
New York	9–13	8–14–1	14–8	8–14	—	8–14	13–8–1	14–6
Philadelphia	11–10	10–12	13–9	14–8	14–8	—	14–8	19–3
St. Louis	7–13	12–10–1	8–14	3–18–1	8–13–1	8–14	—	15–7–1
Washington	6–16	3–19–1	11–11	6–16–2	6–14	3–19	7–15–1	—

=== Roster ===
1909 Chicago White Sox
Roster
Pitchers: Nick Altrock; Bill Burns; Lou Fiene; Fred Olmstead; Frank Owen; Jim Scott; Frank Smith; Harry Suter; Ed Walsh	Catchers: Yip Owens; Fred Payne; Billy Sullivan; Infielders: Jake Atz; George Davis; Jiggs Donahue; Frank Isbell; Freddy Parent; Ham Patterson; Billy Purtell; Barney Reilly; Lee Tannehill	Outfielders: Dave Altizer; Cuke Barrows; Willis Cole; Gavvy Cravath; Patsy Dougherty; Ed Hahn; Bobby Messenger; Mike Welday; Doc White	Manager: Billy Sullivan

== Player stats ==
=== Batting ===
==== Starters by position ====
Note: Pos = Position; G = Games played; AB = At bats; H = Hits; Avg. = Batting average; HR = Home runs; RBI = Runs batted in

Pos	Player	G	AB	H	Avg.	HR	RBI
C	Billy Sullivan	97	265	43	.162	0	16
1B	Frank Isbell	120	433	97	.224	0	33
2B	Jake Atz	119	381	90	.236	0	22
SS	Freddy Parent	136	472	123	.261	0	30
3B	Lee Tannehill	155	531	118	.222	0	47
OF	Ed Hahn	76	287	52	.181	1	16
OF	Patsy Dougherty	139	491	140	.285	1	55
OF	Dave Altizer	116	382	89	.233	1	20

==== Other batters ====
Note: G = Games played; AB = At bats; H = Hits; Avg. = Batting average; HR = Home runs; RBI = Runs batted in

Player	G	AB	H	Avg.	HR	RBI
Billy Purtell	103	361	93	.258	0	40
Doc White	72	192	45	.234	0	7
Yip Owens	64	174	35	.201	0	17
Willis Cole	46	165	39	.236	0	16
Bobby Messenger	31	112	19	.170	0	0
Fred Payne	32	82	20	.244	0	12
Mike Welday	29	74	14	.189	0	5
George Davis	28	68	9	.132	0	2
Gavvy Cravath	19	50	9	.180	1	8
Barney Reilly	12	25	5	.200	0	3
Cuke Barrows	5	20	3	.150	0	2
Jiggs Donahue	2	4	0	.000	0	2
Ham Patterson	1	3	0	.000	0	0

=== Pitching ===
==== Starting pitchers ====
Note: G = Games pitched; IP = Innings pitched; W = Wins; L = Losses; ERA = Earned run average; SO = Strikeouts

Player	G	IP	W	L	ERA	SO
Frank Smith	51	365.0	25	17	1.80	177
Jim Scott	36	250.1	12	12	2.30	135
Ed Walsh	31	230.1	15	11	1.41	127
Doc White	24	177.2	11	9	1.72	77
Bill Burns	23	168.0	7	13	2.04	50
Fred Olmstead	8	54.2	3	2	1.81	21
Nick Altrock	1	9.0	0	1	5.00	2

==== Other pitchers ====
Note: G = Games pitched; IP = Innings pitched; W = Wins; L = Losses; ERA = Earned run average; SO = Strikeouts

Player	G	IP	W	L	ERA	SO
Harry Suter	18	87.1	2	3	2.47	53
Lou Fiene	13	72.0	2	5	4.13	24
Frank Owen	3	16.0	1	1	4.50	3
