= 1910 Boston Red Sox season =

Major League Baseball season

1910 Boston Red Sox
- League: American League
- Ballpark: Huntington Avenue Grounds
- City: Boston, Massachusetts
- Record: 81–72 (.529)
- League place: 4th
- Owners: John I. Taylor
- Managers: Patsy Donovan
- Stats: ESPN.com; Baseball Reference

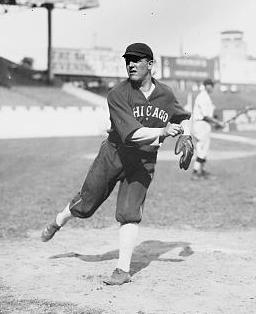
Opening Day pitcher Eddie Cicotte, shown in 1913 with the Chicago White Sox

The 1910 Boston Red Sox season was the tenth season in the franchise's Major League Baseball history. The Red Sox finished fourth in the American League (AL) with a record of 81 wins and 72 losses, 22 1/2 games behind the Philadelphia Athletics, who went on to win the 1910 World Series. The team played its home games at Huntington Avenue Grounds.

== Regular season ==
Prior to the regular season, the team held spring training in Hot Springs, Arkansas.

- April 14: The regular season opens with a 4–4 tie, in 14 innings, against the New York Highlanders at Hilltop Park in New York City.
- April 16: Duffy Lewis makes his major league debut.
- April 19: The first home games of the season are a doubleheader against the Washington Senators; Boston wins both games, 2–1 and 5–4.
- April 27: In an 11–1 road win over Washington, Boston starts its "Golden Outfield" for the first time; Duffy Lewis in left, Tris Speaker in center, and Harry Hooper in right.
- May 26: Red Kleinow was purchased by the Red Sox from the Highlanders.
- July 20: The team's longest winning streak of the season, nine games, ends with a home loss to the Detroit Tigers.
- August 14: The team's longest losing streak of the season, six games, ends with a road win over the St. Louis Browns.
- October 8: The regular season ends with a doubleheader on the road against the Highlanders; Boston loses both games, 4–1 and 6–5, in games that last 72 and 100 minutes, respectively.

The team's longest games of the season were 15 innings; a May 23 home loss to Chicago, and a June 29 road win at Philadelphia.

=== Statistical leaders ===
The offense was led by Jake Stahl, who hit 10 home runs and had 77 RBIs, and Tris Speaker with a .340 batting average. The pitching staff was led by Eddie Cicotte with 15 wins, Ray Collins with a 1.62 ERA, and Smoky Joe Wood with 145 strikeouts.

=== Season standings ===
American League
Team	W	L	Pct.	GB	Home	Road
Philadelphia Athletics	102	48	.680	—	57‍–‍19	45‍–‍29
New York Highlanders	88	63	.583	14½	49‍–‍25	39‍–‍38
Detroit Tigers	86	68	.558	18	46‍–‍31	40‍–‍37
Boston Red Sox	81	72	.529	22½	51‍–‍28	30‍–‍44
Cleveland Naps	71	81	.467	32	39‍–‍36	32‍–‍45
Chicago White Sox	68	85	.444	35½	41‍–‍37	27‍–‍48
Washington Senators	66	85	.437	36½	38‍–‍35	28‍–‍50
St. Louis Browns	47	107	.305	57	26‍–‍51	21‍–‍56

The team had five games end in a tie; April 14 at New York, May 27 vs. Cleveland, June 14 at Detroit, September 26 at Cleveland, and October 5 at Washington. Tie games are not counted in league standings, but player statistics during tie games are counted.

=== Record vs. opponents ===
1910 American League record Sources:
Team	BOS	CWS	CLE	DET	NYH	PHA	SLB	WSH
Boston	—	10–12	14–8–3	12–10	9–13–1	4–18	16–6	16–5–1
Chicago	12–10	—	10–12	9–13	8–13–2	8–14–1	12–10	9–13
Cleveland	8–14–3	12–10	—	9–13	8–13	7–14–4	18–4–1	9–13–1
Detroit	10–12	13–9	13–9	—	13–9	9–13	15–7	13–9–1
New York	13–9–1	13–8–2	13–8	9–13	—	9–12	16–6–1	15–7–1
Philadelphia	18–4	14–8–1	14–7–4	13–9	12–9	—	17–5	14–6
St. Louis	6–16	10–12	4–18–1	7–15	6–16–1	5–17	—	9–13–2
Washington	5–16–1	13–9	13–9–1	9–13–1	7–15–1	6–14	13–9–2	—

=== Opening Day lineup ===
Amby McConnell	2B
Harry Lord	3B
Tris Speaker	CF
Jake Stahl	1B
Heinie Wagner	SS
Harry Niles	RF
Harry Hooper	LF
Bill Carrigan	C
Ed Cicotte	P

=== Roster ===
1910 Boston Red Sox
Roster
Pitchers: Frank Arellanes; Frank Barberich; Eddie Cicotte; Ray Collins; Charley Hall; Ben Hunt; Ed Karger; Louis Leroy; Chris Mahoney; Marty McHale; Charlie Smith; Frank Smith; Smoky Joe Wood	Catchers: Bill Carrigan; Pat Donahue; Red Kleinow; Bunny Madden; Infielders: Hugh Bradley; Clyde Engle; Charlie French; Larry Gardner; Ed Hearne; Dutch Lerchen; Amby McConnell; Harry Lord; Doc Moskiman; Billy Purtell; Jake Stahl; Heinie Wagner	Outfielders: Harry Hooper; Duffy Lewis; Hap Myers; Harry Niles; Ralph Pond; Tris Speaker	Manager: Patsy Donovan

== Player stats ==
=== Batting ===
==== Starters by position ====
Note: Pos = Position; G = Games played; AB = At bats; H = Hits; Avg. = Batting average; HR = Home runs; RBI = Runs batted in

Pos	Player	G	AB	H	Avg.	HR	RBI
C	Bill Carrigan	114	342	85	.249	3	53
1B	Jake Stahl	144	531	144	.271	10	77
2B	Larry Gardner	113	413	117	.283	2	36
SS	Heinie Wagner	142	491	134	.273	1	52
3B	Harry Lord	77	288	72	.250	1	32
OF	Tris Speaker	141	538	183	.340	7	65
OF	Duffy Lewis	151	541	153	.283	8	68
OF	Harry Hooper	155	584	156	.267	2	27

==== Other batters ====
Note: G = Games played; AB = At bats; H = Hits; Avg. = Batting average; HR = Home runs; RBI = Runs batted in

Player	G	AB	H	Avg.	HR	RBI
Clyde Engle	106	363	96	.264	2	38
Billy Purtell	49	168	35	.208	1	15
Red Kleinow	50	147	22	.150	1	8
Hugh Bradley	32	83	14	.169	0	7
Harry Niles	18	57	12	.211	1	3
Charlie French	9	40	8	.200	0	3
Bunny Madden	14	35	13	.371	0	4
Amby McConnell	11	35	6	.171	0	1
Dutch Lerchen	6	15	0	.000	0	0
Doc Moskiman	5	9	1	.111	0	1
Hap Myers	3	6	2	.333	0	0
Ralph Pond	1	4	1	.250	0	0
Pat Donahue	2	4	0	.000	0	0
Ed Hearne	2	2	0	.000	0	0

=== Pitching ===
==== Starting pitchers ====
Note: G = Games pitched; IP = Innings pitched; W = Wins; L = Losses; ERA = Earned run average; SO = Strikeouts

Player	G	IP	W	L	ERA	SO
Eddie Cicotte	36	250	15	11	2.74	104
Ray Collins	35	244 2/3	13	11	1.62	109
Ed Karger	27	183 1/3	11	7	3.19	81
Charlie Smith	24	156 1/3	11	6	2.30	53
Frank Arellanes	18	100	4	7	2.88	33
Ben Hunt	7	46 2/3	2	3	4.05	19
Frank Smith	4	28	1	2	4.82	8
Marty McHale	2	11	0	1	3.27	6

==== Other pitchers ====
Note: G = Games pitched; IP = Innings pitched; W = Wins; L = Losses; ERA = Earned run average; SO = Strikeouts

Player	G	IP	W	L	ERA	SO
Smoky Joe Wood	35	196 2/3	12	13	1.69	145
Charley Hall	35	188 2/3	12	9	1.91	95
Chris Mahoney	2	11	0	1	3.27	6

==== Relief pitchers ====
Note: G = Games pitched; W = Wins; L = Losses; SV = Saves; ERA = Earned run average; SO = Strikeouts

Player	G	W	L	SV	ERA	SO
Frank Barberich	2	0	0	0	7.20	0
Louis Leroy	1	0	0	0	11.25	3
