= Lerchen =

Lerchen is a surname. Notable people with this surname include:

- Dutch Lerchen (1889–1962), American baseball player
- George Lerchen (1922–2014), American baseball player
