= Ironia =

Ironia may refer to:

- Ironia, New Jersey

== Music ==
- Ironía, album by Andy Andy; Best Debut Album and Tropical Album of the Year 2006 Latin Billboard Music Awards
- "Ironía", 1996 song by Frankie Ruiz
- "Ironía" (es), by Maná Cama Incendiada 2015
- Ironías, album fifth studio album by Puerto Rican salsero Víctor Manuelle 1998
- Que Ironía (disambiguation)
