= List of Detroit Tigers team records =

This is a list of Detroit Tigers single-season, career, and other team records.

== Single season records ==
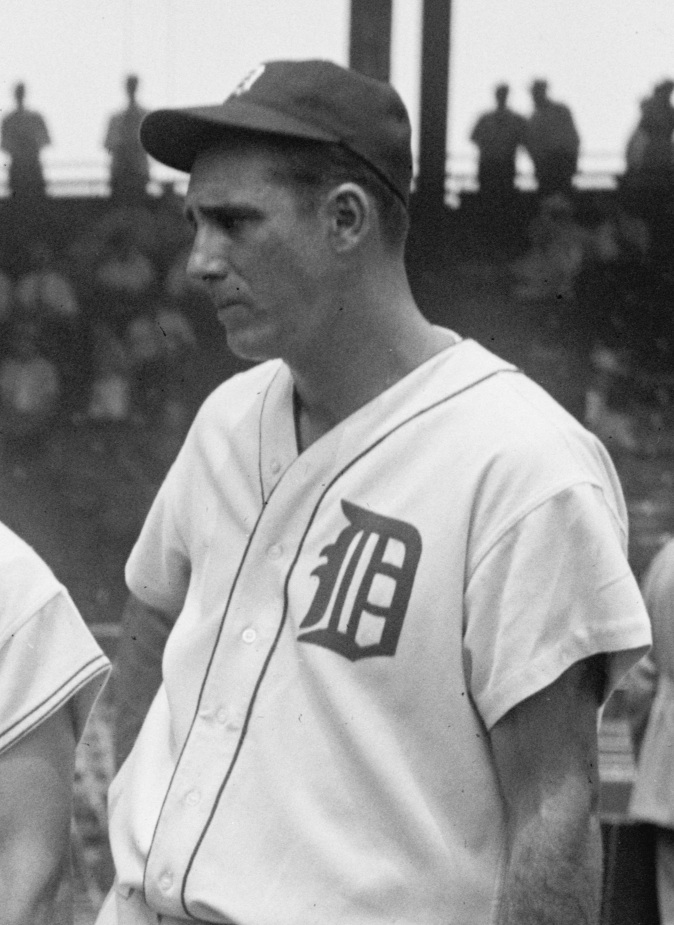
Hank Greenberg, Hall of Famer and 2-time MVP

Batting leaders

- Batting average: .420 Ty Cobb (1911)
- On-base pct.: .487 Norm Cash (1961)
- Slugging pct.: .683 Hank Greenberg (1938)
- OPS: 1.148 Norm Cash (1961)
- Games: 163 Rocky Colavito (1961)
- At bats: 679 Harvey Kuenn (1953)
- Runs: 147 Ty Cobb (1911)
- Hits: 248 Ty Cobb (1911)
- Total bases: 397 Hank Greenberg (1937)
- Doubles: 63 Hank Greenberg (1934)
- Triples: 26 Sam Crawford (1914)
- Home runs: 58 Hank Greenberg (1938)
- Runs batted in: 183 Hank Greenberg (1937)
- Bases on balls: 137 Roy Cullenbine (1947)
- Strikeouts: 182 Cecil Fielder (1990)
- Stolen bases: 96 Ty Cobb (1915)
- Singles: 169 Ty Cobb (1911)
- Runs created: 172 Hank Greenberg (1937)
- Extra-base hits: 103 Hank Greenberg (1937)
- Times on base: 336 Ty Cobb (1915)
- Hit by pitch: 24 Bill Freehan (1968)
- Sacrifice hits: 52 Donie Bush (1909)
- Intentional walks: 32 Miguel Cabrera (2010)
- Grounded into double plays: 29 Jimmy Bloodworth (1943)
- At bats per strikeout: 57.3 Johnny Bassler (1925)
- At bats per home run: 9.6 Hank Greenberg (1938)
- Outs: 528 Ian Kinsler (2014)
- Wins Above Replacement (Baseball-Reference): 11.4 Ty Cobb (1917)
- Wins above Replacement (Fangraphs): 11.5 Ty Cobb (1917)

Pitching leaders

- ERA: 1.64 Ed Summers (1908)
- Wins: 31 Denny McLain (1968)
- Win–loss %: .862 Bill Donovan (1907)
- WHIP: .905 Denny McLain (1968)
- Hits allowed per 9 innings pitched: 6.239 Justin Verlander (2011)
- Walks allowed per 9 innings pitched: 1.29 Fred Hutchinson (1951)
- Strikeouts per 9 innings pitched: 11.08 Max Scherzer (2012)
- Saves: 49 José Valverde (2011)
- Innings: 382 1/3 George Mullin (1904)
- Strikeouts: 308 Mickey Lolich (1971)
- Games started: 45 Mickey Lolich (1971)
- Complete games: 42 George Mullin (1904)
- Shutouts: 9 Denny McLain (1969)
- Home runs allowed: 42 Denny McLain (1966)
- Walks allowed: 158 Joe Coleman (1974)
- Hits allowed: 346 George Mullin (1907)
- Strikeout to walk: 4.46 Justin Verlander (2016)
- Losses: 23 George Mullin (1904)
- Earned runs allowed: 142 Mickey Lolich (1974)
- Wild pitches: 24 Jack Morris (1987)
- Hit batters: 23 Howard Ehmke (1922)
- Batters faced: 1,597 George Mullin (1904)
- Games finished: 70 José Valverde (2011)
- Wins Above Replacement (Baseball-Reference): 11.2 Hal Newhouser (1945)
- Wins Above Replacement (Fangraphs): 10.2 Hal Newhouser (1946)

- Strikeouts in one game: 17 Aníbal Sánchez (2013)

== Career records ==
Career batting records

- Batting average: .368 Ty Cobb
- On-base percentage: .434 Ty Cobb
- Slugging percentage: .616 Hank Greenberg
- OPS: 1.028 Hank Greenberg
- Games: 2834 Al Kaline
- At bats: 10591 Ty Cobb
- Runs: 2088 Ty Cobb
- Hits: 3900 Ty Cobb
- Total bases: 5466 Ty Cobb
- Doubles: 665 Ty Cobb
- Triples: 309 Sam Crawford
- Home runs: 399 Al Kaline
- Runs batted in: 1804 Ty Cobb
- Bases on balls: 1277 Al Kaline
- Strikeouts: 1103 Brandon Inge
- Stolen bases: 865 Ty Cobb
- Singles: 2840 Ty Cobb
- Runs created: 2365 Ty Cobb
- Extra-base hits: 1060 Ty Cobb
- Times on base: 5133 Ty Cobb
- Hit by pitch: 114 Bill Freehan
- Sacrifice hits: 327 Donie Bush
- Sacrifice flies: 104 Al Kaline
- Intentional walks: 150 Miguel Cabrera
- Grounded into double plays: 271 Al Kaline
- At bats per strikeout: 31.6 Doc Cramer
- At bats per home run: 15.0 Cecil Fielder
- Outs: 7594 Al Kaline

Career pitching records

- ERA: 2.34 Harry Coveleski
- Wins: 222 Hooks Dauss
- Win–loss %: .701 Max Scherzer
- WHIP: 1.112 Denny McLain
- Hits Allowed per 9 Innings Pitched: 7.56 Denny McLain
- Walks Allowed per 9 Innings Pitched: 1.75 Don Mossi
- Strikeouts per 9 Innings Pitched: 9.604 Max Scherzer
- Games: 545 John Hiller
- Saves: 206 Todd Jones
- Innings: 3394 George Mullin
- Strikeouts: 2679 Mickey Lolich
- Games started: 459 Mickey Lolich
- Complete games: 336 George Mullin
- Shutouts: 39 Mickey Lolich
- Home Runs Allowed: 329 Mickey Lolich
- Walks Allowed: 1227 Hal Newhouser
- Hits Allowed: 3407 Hooks Dauss
- Strikeout to Walk: 3.544 Max Scherzer
- Losses: 182 Hooks Dauss
- Earned Runs Allowed: 1289 Mickey Lolich
- Wild Pitches: 155 Jack Morris
- Hit Batsmen: 121 Hooks Dauss
- Batters Faced: 14203 Hooks Dauss
- Games Finished: 401 Todd Jones

== Tigers hitting for the cycle ==
- Bobby Veach, September 17, 1920
- Bob Fothergill, September 26, 1926
- Gee Walker, April 20, 1937
- Charlie Gehringer, May 27, 1939
- Vic Wertz, September 14, 1947
- George Kell, June 2, 1950
- Hoot Evers, September 7, 1950
- Travis Fryman, July 28, 1993
- Damion Easley, June 8, 2001
- Carlos Guillén, August 1, 2006

== Sortable batting statistics of Detroit Tigers batters with 1500+ at bats current through 2014 season ==
Note: G = Games played; P = Position; AB = At bats; R = Runs; H = Hits; 2B = Doubles; 3B = Triples; HR = Home runs; RBI = Runs batted in; BB= Bases on balls; SO = Strikeouts; SB = Stolen bases; Avg. = Batting average; OBP = On base percentage; Slg. = Slugging percentage

Player	Position	G	AB	R	H	2B	3B	HR	RBI	BB	SO	SB	Avg.	OBP	Slg.
Cobb, Ty	OF	2806	10586	2087	3902	664	286	111	1805	1148	329	865	.369	.424	.517
Kaline, Al	OF	2834	10116	1622	3007	498	75	399	1583	1277	1020	137	.297	.377	.480
Gehringer, Charlie	2B	2323	8860	1774	2839	574	146	184	1427	1186	372	181	.320	.398	.480
Whitaker, Lou	2B	2390	8570	1386	2369	420	65	244	1084	1197	1099	143	.276	.363	.426
Trammell, Alan	SS	2293	8288	1231	2365	412	55	185	1003	850	874	236	.285	.352	.415
Crawford, Sam	OF	2114	7984	1115	2466	402	249	70	1264	646	104	317	.309	.353	.448
Heilmann, Harry	OF	1990	7297	1209	2499	497	145	164	1442	792	498	111	.342	.397	.518
Bush, Donie	SS	1872	6970	1242	1745	181	73	9	427	1125	334	400	.250	.343	.301
Cash, Norm	1B	2018	6593	1028	1793	241	40	373	1087	1025	1081	42	.272	.374	.490
Freehan, Bill	C	1774	6073	706	1591	241	35	200	758	626	753	24	.262	.340	.412
Veach, Bobby	OF	1604	5979	859	1859	345	136	59	1042	512	345	189	.311	.357	.444
McAuliffe, Dick	2B	1656	5898	856	1471	218	70	192	672	842	932	61	.249	.345	.408
Horton, Willie	OF	1515	5405	671	1490	211	31	262	886	469	945	14	.276	.337	.472
Stanley, Mickey	OF	1516	5022	641	1243	201	48	117	500	371	564	44	.248	.298	.377
Higginson, Bobby	OF	1362	4910	736	1336	270	33	187	709	649	796	91	.272	.358	.455
Greenberg, Hank	1B	1269	4791	980	1528	366	69	306	1202	748	771	58	.319	.410	.616
York, Rudy	1B	1268	4677	738	1317	236	42	239	936	641	672	34	.282	.368	.503
Inge, Brandon	3B	1408	4626	527	1083	212	38	140	589	417	1189	45	.234	.304	.387
Northrup, Jim	OF	1279	4437	571	1184	204	42	145	570	420	603	39	.267	.332	.430
Rogell, Billy	SS	1207	4418	668	1210	227	64	39	532	590	316	76	.274	.357	.381
Kuenn, Harvey	SS	1049	4372	620	1372	244	43	53	423	322	205	51	.314	.360	.426
Rodríguez, Aurelio	3B	1241	4352	417	1040	193	31	85	423	207	589	13	.239	.274	.356
Fryman, Travis	3B	1096	4297	607	1176	229	29	149	679	390	931	58	.274	.334	.444
Parrish, Lance	C	1146	4273	577	1123	201	23	212	700	334	847	22	.263	.317	.469
Gibson, Kirk	OF	1177	4170	698	1140	187	45	195	668	499	930	194	.273	.354	.480
Cabrera, Miguel	1B	1099	4135	716	1344	281	5	252	846	537	726	20	.325	.402	.578
Lemon, Chet	OF	1203	4074	570	1071	218	32	142	536	468	647	13	.263	.349	.437
Fox, Pete	OF	997	3919	670	1182	222	52	59	493	279	319	107	.302	.346	.430
Wert, Don	3B	1090	3800	415	927	128	15	77	364	385	519	22	.244	.316	.346
Fielder, Cecil	1B	982	3674	558	947	141	4	245	758	519	926	2	.258	.351	.498
Brookens, Tom	3B	1206	3543	445	871	162	38	66	397	256	553	85	.246	.297	.369
Stanage, Oscar	C	1095	3502	248	819	123	34	8	321	219	268	30	.234	.277	.295
Blue, Lu	1B	925	3394	669	1002	176	66	19	407	589	236	85	.295	.392	.403
Kell, George	3B	826	3303	503	1075	210	35	25	414	337	107	34	.325	.382	.433
LeFlore, Ron	OF	787	3266	532	970	126	38	51	265	251	628	294	.297	.348	.406
Ordóñez, Magglio	OF	847	3171	452	989	186	6	107	533	318	421	12	.312	.373	.476
Young, Ralph	2B	890	3158	416	792	89	28	3	219	437	211	82	.251	.328	.300
Higgins, Pinky	3B	857	3134	414	878	164	16	60	472	399	209	25	.280	.358	.400
Easley, Damion	2B	841	3090	456	803	174	16	104	400	296	563	81	.260	.339	.428
Walker, Gee	OF	794	3046	475	966	216	32	61	468	140	253	132	.317	.347	.469
Guillén, Carlos	SS	817	3008	469	892	186	35	95	449	327	492	59	.297	.366	.476
McIntyre, Matty	OF	795	2997	412	783	109	54	3	211	331	–	89	.261	.332	.337
Jones, Bob	3B	853	2990	399	791	120	38	7	316	208	156	49	.265	.299	.337
Owen, Marv	3B	792	2954	363	820	135	38	25	421	269	233	20	.278	.335	.374
Bolling, Frank	2B	785	2915	382	761	126	26	64	312	274	305	28	.261	.326	.388
Clark, Tony	1B	772	2831	428	783	156	7	156	514	343	721	6	.277	.355	.502
O'Leary, Charley	SS	833	2825	284	642	89	13	3	182	144	–	71	.227	.260	.271
Wertz, Vic	OF	836	2793	443	798	145	30	109	531	395	372	5	.286	.374	.476
Vitt, Ossie	3B	767	2763	417	671	75	40	32	214	323	97	99	.243	.307	.302
Herndon, Larry	OF	843	2748	358	765	110	37	83	364	222	441	32	.278	.331	.436
Phillips, Tony	OF	722	2747	502	771	129	15	61	309	519	480	70	.281	.395	.405
Cramer, Doc	OF	720	2720	329	768	96	29	12	243	185	86	19	.282	.325	.352
Evers, Hoot	OF	769	2718	410	787	140	34	63	429	316	258	35	.290	.362	.436
Maxwell, Charlie	OF	853	2696	413	723	92	20	133	455	394	432	15	.268	.363	.465
Jackson, Austin	OF	670	2678	447	743	140	43	46	234	257	699	78	.277	.342	.413
Moriarty, George	3B	771	2666	272	670	112	19	5	283	178	59	190	.251	.294	.313
Polanco, Plácido	2B	632	2589	393	806	139	13	37	285	146	162	26	.311	.355	.418
Granderson, Curtis	OF	674	2579	435	702	125	57	102	299	274	618	67	.272	.344	.484
Kemp, Steve	OF	684	2504	378	711	114	18	89	422	375	362	24	.284	.376	.450
Mullin, Pat	OF	864	2493	381	676	106	43	87	385	330	312	20	.271	.355	.453
Boone, Ray	3B	683	2485	351	723	100	30	105	460	317	255	8	.291	.372	.482
Fothergill, Bob	OF	802	2444	381	823	182	47	26	447	152	138	36	.337	.368	.482
Stone, John	OF	644	2428	381	736	146	50	45	356	216	219	24	.303	.359	.460
Cruz, Deivi	SS	703	2405	258	652	157	9	37	277	69	256	12	.271	.293	.390
McCosky, Barney	OF	596	2385	409	744	130	52	19	231	283	165	52	.312	.382	.434
Rodríguez, Iván	C	611	2382	300	709	140	17	62	300	106	418	30	.298	.328	.449
Evans, Darrell	1B	727	2349	357	559	72	1	141	405	437	433	12	.238	.357	.450
Monroe, Craig	OF	672	2348	324	607	130	9	101	379	153	488	17	.259	.303	.451
Colavito, Rocky	OF	629	2336	377	633	107	7	139	430	346	301	6	.271	.364	.501
McManus, Marty	2B	640	2314	350	664	145	27	47	374	253	172	65	.287	.351	.434
Lipon, Johnny	SS	611	2272	308	609	80	23	10	234	301	115	26	.268	.348	.337
Infante, Omar	2B	676	2271	273	605	112	25	46	225	129	373	46	.266	.305	.399
Groth, Johnny	OF	737	2266	307	663	126	19	34	302	274	171	7	.293	.367	.410
Brown, Gates	OF	1051	2262	330	582	78	19	84	322	242	275	30	.257	.330	.420
Barrett, Jimmy	OF	589	2259	383	660	59	30	10	174	309	–	92	.292	.377	.358
Bassler, Johnny	C	767	2240	245	690	98	15	1	312	422	73	10	.308	.406	.367
Schaefer, Germany	2B	626	2236	279	558	75	25	8	195	158	–	123	.250	.285	.316
Mayo, Eddie	2B	587	2215	269	586	99	13	23	229	196	111	26	.265	.316	.352
Santiago, Ramón	SS	818	2210	265	540	76	18	28	195	175	377	28	.244	.312	.333
Thompson, Jason	1B	615	2204	279	565	82	10	98	354	298	375	4	.256	.343	.436
Jones, Davy	OF	645	2173	412	586	47	19	0	138	272	–	140	.270	.348	.309
Tuttle, Bill	OF	581	2155	278	566	77	23	35	250	220	204	18	.263	.329	.368
Wakefield, Dick	OF	632	2128	334	624	102	29	56	314	358	268	10	.293	.394	.447
Coughlin, Bill	3B	593	2117	236	500	56	14	2	190	133	–	73	.236	.279	.279
Staub, Rusty	OF	549	2100	264	582	104	8	70	358	250	149	8	.277	.353	.434
Manush, Heinie	OF	615	2099	385	674	124	42	38	345	149	129	48	.321	.365	.475
Brinkman, Ed	SS	630	2060	192	458	68	10	28	180	145	255	3	.277	.353	.434
Tebbetts, Birdie	C	646	2058	194	535	99	19	16	254	195	135	13	.260	.322	.350
Hayworth, Ray	C	658	2006	219	538	90	16	5	237	190	178	2	.268	.328	.336
Bruton, Bill	OF	558	1977	315	525	74	23	46	218	207	257	64	.266	.336	.396
Bergman, Dave	1B	871	1967	225	509	73	12	39	219	268	248	9	.259	.346	.368
Goslin, Goose	OF	524	1957	346	582	116	22	50	369	241	137	24	.297	.374	.456
Johnson, Roy	OF	473	1918	352	550	126	48	23	181	199	183	77	.287	.353	.438
Avila, Alex	C	616	1906	225	470	106	7	62	269	285	587	7	.247	.345	.407
Tettleton, Mickey	C	570	1887	303	469	85	8	112	333	429	505	6	.249	.387	.480
Tavene, Jackie	SS	540	1881	229	490	79	49	11	216	160	203	45	.260	.308	.372
Wood, Jake	2B	592	1860	278	467	53	26	35	167	158	359	79	.251	.314	.364
Wockenfuss, John	C	677	1855	246	485	70	10	80	284	239	247	4	.261	.346	.439
White, Jo-Jo	OF	630	1800	348	475	60	33	6	173	275	191	75	.264	.360	.344
Young, Dmitri	OF	487	1793	255	500	100	13	82	267	143	379	6	.279	.340	.486
Alexander, Dale	1B	467	1761	271	583	123	26	48	363	168	156	16	.331	.384	.512
Burns, George	1B	496	1756	206	467	76	24	15	220	91	170	47	.266	.302	.362
Martínez, Víctor	DH	455	1706	231	548	109	0	58	289	170	155	4	.321	.381	.487
Swift, Bob	C	642	1690	134	392	47	1	12	144	223	145	6	.232	.315	.282
Lumpe, Jerry	2B	497	1761	196	419	54	12	15	128	146	157	9	.248	.308	.321
Peralta, Jhonny	SS	460	1682	199	463	94	6	53	242	145	332	4	.275	.332	.433
Priddy, Jerry	2B	451	1677	228	448	77	17	26	176	223	216	8	.267	.350	.380
Outlaw, Jimmy	OF	532	1676	223	449	70	14	6	168	175	131	21	.268	.335	.337
Encarnación, Juan	OF	444	1670	222	450	84	24	53	224	78	339	68	.269	.310	.444
Rigney, Topper	SS	493	1651	233	489	75	29	9	249	246	133	37	.296	.369	.393
Lake, Eddie	SS	491	1634	293	375	58	8	23	111	342	179	31	.229	.358	.317
Raburn, Ryan	OF	566	1573	223	403	95	8	54	216	113	416	16	.256	.311	.430
Cullenbine, Roy	OF	501	1561	268	421	76	11	63	259	373	164	10	.270	.409	.454

== Sortable pitching statistics of Detroit Tigers pitchers with 200+ games or 750+ innings ==
Note: W = Wins; L = Losses; PCT = Win percentage; ERA = Earned run average; G = Games; GS = Games started; CG = Complete games; SHO = Shutouts; SV = Saves; IP = Innings pitched; HR = Home runs allowed; HBP = Hit by pitch; BB = Bases on balls; SO = Strikeouts

Player	Years	W	L	PCT	ERA	G	GS	CG	SHO	SV	IP	HR	HBP	BB	SO
Hiller, John	1965–80	87	76	.534	2.83	545	43	13	6	125	1242.0	110	12	535	1036
Dauss, Hooks	1912–26	223	182	.551	3.30	538	388	245	22	39	3390.2	87	121	1067	1201
Lolich, Mickey	1963–75	207	175	.542	3.45	508	459	190	39	10	3361.2	329	91	1014	2679
Trout, Dizzy	1939–52	161	153	.513	3.20	493	305	156	28	34	2591.2	109	31	978	1199
Henneman, Mike	1987–96	57	34	.626	3.05	491	0	0	0	154	669.2	40	17	250	480
Jones, Todd	1997–01; 2006–08	23	32	.418	4.07	480	0	0	0	235	479.1	41	12	205	372
Newhouser, Hal	1939–55	200	148	.575	3.07	460	373	212	33	19	2944.0	133	19	1227	1770
Mullin, George	1902–13	209	179	.539	2.76	435	395	336	34	6	3394.0	37	115	1106	1380
Morris, Jack	1977–90	198	150	.569	3.73	430	408	154	24	0	3042.2	321	36	1086	1980
Bridges, Tommy	1930–46	194	138	.584	3.57	424	362	200	33	10	2826.1	181	35	1192	1674
Hernández, Willie	1984–89	36	31	.537	2.98	358	0	0	0	120	483.2	52	15	138	384
López, Aurelio	1979–85	53	30	.639	3.41	355	4	0	0	85	713.0	86	12	288	519
Aguirre, Hank	1958–67	64	64	.500	3.29	334	138	41	7	27	1179.0	111	40	393	755
Walker, Jamie	2002–06	12	12	.500	3.33	327	0	0	0	5	270.0	39	9	59	205
Whitehill, Earl	1923–32	133	119	.528	4.16	325	287	147	11	7	2171.1	105	65	831	838
Trucks, Virgil	1941–52, 1956	114	96	.543	3.50	316	229	84	20	13	1800.2	123	33	732	1046
Rodney, Fernando	2002–09	15	30	.333	4.28	308	0	0	0	70	330.0	31	19	170	314
Petry, Dan	1979–87; 1990–91	119	93	.561	3.84	306	274	48	10	0	1843.0	187	38	744	957
Bunning, Jim	1955–63	118	87	.576	3.45	304	251	78	16	12	1867.1	223	73	564	1406
Lary, Frank	1954–64	123	110	.528	3.46	304	274	123	20	7	2008.2	180	90	579	1031
Coke, Phil	2010–14	17	24	.414	4.25	299	15	0	0	6	323.2	20	11	125	244
Verlander, Justin	2005–14	152	89	.630	3.53	298	298	20	6	0	1978.0	174	69	610	2373
Benton, Al	1938–48	71	64	.526	3.46	296	126	47	8	45	1218.2	77	10	500	510
Foytack, Paul	1953–63	81	81	.500	4.14	285	185	63	7	7	1425.1	165	15	631	789
Sorrell, Vic	1928–37	92	101	.477	4.43	280	216	95	8	10	1671.2	101	20	706	619
White, Hal	1941–52	40	49	.449	3.79	273	67	23	7	18	820.1	39	12	404	313
Donovan, Bill	1903–12, 1918	140	96	.593	2.49	261	242	213	29	3	2137.1	27	64	685	1079
Tanana, Frank	1985–92	96	82	.539	4.08	250	243	27	7	1	1551.1	182	40	527	958
Anderson, Matt	1998–03	15	7	.682	4.89	245	0	0	0	26	246.2	27	9	146	220
Rowe, Schoolboy	1933–42	105	62	.629	4.01	245	181	92	16	8	1445.0	91	10	403	662
Hutchinson, Fred	1939–53	95	71	.572	3.73	242	169	81	13	7	1464.0	127	14	388	591
Brocail, Doug	1997–00	17	14	.548	3.06	240	4	0	0	4	273.1	24	10	93	234
Hoeft, Billy	1952–59	74	78	.486	4.02	239	176	71	16	11	1324.2	129	31	481	783
Wilcox, Milt	1977–85	97	75	.564	3.91	234	220	63	7	0	1495.1	143	51	537	851
Holloway, Ken	1922–28	57	46	.553	4.41	232	97	37	2	16	976.2	40	35	338	242
Willett, Ed	1906–13	96	80	.545	2.89	230	179	127	12	3	1545.2	17	92	491	508
McLain, Denny	1963–70	117	62	.654	3.13	227	219	94	26	1	1593.0	195	22	450	1150
Valverde, José	2010–13	7	13	.350	3.22	226	0	0	0	119	223.2	19	12	99	199
Hogsett, Elon	1929–36, 1944	39	47	.453	4.45	223	50	18	1	27	738.1	39	32	300	273
Bonderman, Jeremy	2003–10, 2013	68	78	.466	4.91	218	193	6	2	0	1192.2	150	39	414	945
Gladding, Fred	1961–67	26	11	.703	2.70	217	1	0	0	33	337.0	27	13	131	262
Stoner, Lil	1922–29	50	58	.463	4.74	217	110	45	1	14	984.1	60	28	366	296
Terrell, Walt	1985–88; 1990–92	76	76	.500	4.26	216	190	44	9	0	1328.0	126	25	516	621
Gibson, Paul	1988–91	18	21	.462	3.88	214	14	0	0	11	417.1	37	12	183	235
Nitkowski, C.J.	1995–01	11	24	.314	5.68	213	37	0	0	0	321.2	45	22	183	234
Scherman, Fred	1969–73	25	15	.625	3.39	212	4	1	0	34	342.1	29	14	160	188
Gray, Ted	1946–54	58	72	.446	4.25	208	159	50	7	4	1110.2	110	28	580	676
Rozema, Dave	1977–84	57	46	.553	3.38	208	128	36	7	10	1007.1	102	27	233	403
Fox, Terry	1961–66	26	17	.605	2.77	207	0	0	0	55	344.1	31	10	101	158
Houtteman, Art	1945–53	53	69	.434	4.13	206	126	58	11	16	1076.1	97	26	351	453
Benoit, Joaquín	2011–13	13	7	.650	2.89	205	0	0	0	28	199.0	24	4	61	220
Killian, Ed	1904–10	100	74	.575	2.38	205	172	142	19	4	1536.2	8	66	469	498
Gorsica, Johnny	1940–47	31	39	.443	4.18	204	64	22	4	17	723.2	44	17	247	272
Coleman, Joe	1971–76	88	73	.547	3.82	203	201	56	11	0	1407.2	130	52	576	1000
Boland, Bernie	1915–20	67	49	.598	3.09	202	113	59	10	13	1035.0	11	27	404	358
Robertson, Nate	2003–09	51	68	.425	4.92	196	168	4	0	1	1042.2	145	26	374	709
Auker, Elden	1933–38	77	52	.597	4.26	195	136	70	9	2	1083.2	63	28	378	351
Overmire, Stubby	1943–49	47	45	.511	3.92	195	103	38	9	10	830.2	35	8	234	225
Ehmke, Howard	1916–22	75	75	.500	3.61	186	144	89	10	6	1236.1	43	60	516	458
Dubuc, Jean	1912–16	71	60	.542	3.06	184	130	90	11	9	1145.0	13	36	448	354
Porcello, Rick	2009–14	76	63	.546	4.30	184	180	4	3	0	1073.1	111	31	263	655
Sparma, Joe	1964–69	52	48	.520	3.84	174	136	30	10	0	835.1	70	25	411	563
Scherzer, Max	2010–14	82	35	.700	3.52	161	161	1	1	0	1013.0	108	29	305	1081
Coveleski, Harry	1914–18	69	43	.616	2.34	157	125	68	9	8	1023.1	12	45	270	400
Mossi, Don	1959–63	59	44	.573	3.49	151	129	47	7	4	929.2	110	9	181	520
Earl Wilson	1966–70	64	45	.587	3.18	149	145	39	7	0	962.1	108	13	296	709
Oldham, Red	1914–22	34	44	.436	4.09	148	87	35	2	9	759.2	32	30	256	241
Maroth, Mike	2002–07	50	62	.446	4.81	147	143	3	1	0	880.0	122	30	245	420
Siever, Ed	1901–02; 1906–08	60	53	.531	2.61	143	123	93	11	2	1036.0	15	31	207	303
Summers, Ed	1908–12	68	45	.602	2.42	138	112	79	9	3	999.0	19	46	221	362
Moehler, Brian	1996–02	48	52	.480	4.44	131	131	10	6	0	809.0	98	16	227	446
Uhle, George	1929–33	44	41	.518	3.91	128	92	62	5	10	828.1	53	15	224	332
Leonard, Dutch	1919–25	49	49	.500	3.79	120	112	56	8	2	830.2	38	27	252	389
Newsom, Bobo	1939–41	50	35	.588	3.59	114	101	53	8	4	760.1	48	8	322	503

== See also ==
- Detroit Tigers award winners and league leaders
