= Doc Moskiman =

American baseball player (1879–1953)

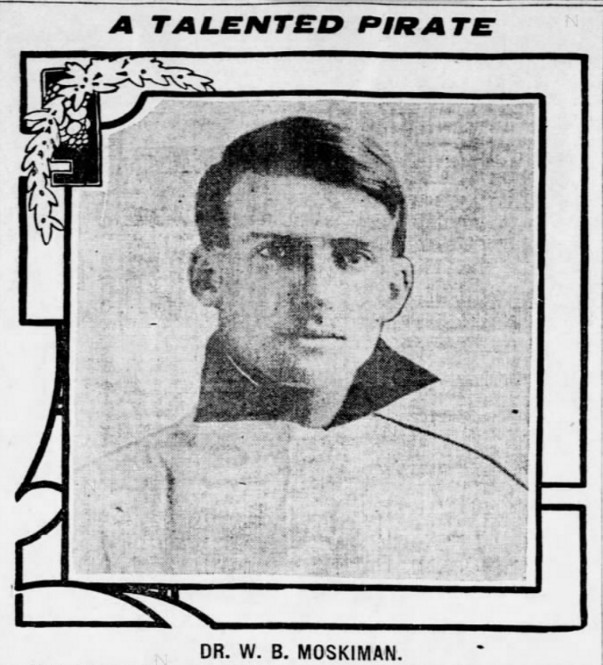
- First baseman / Outfielder
- Born: December 20, 1879; Oakland, California, U.S.
- Died: January 11, 1953 (aged 73); San Leandro, California, U.S.
- Batted: Right Threw: Right

MLB debut
- August 23, 1910, for the Boston Red Sox

Last MLB appearance
- October 8, 1910, for the Boston Red Sox

MLB statistics
- Batting average: .111
- Runs: 1
- Runs batted in: 1
- Stats at Baseball Reference

Teams
- Boston Red Sox (1910)

William Bankhead Moskiman (December 20, 1879 – January 11, 1953) was an American first baseman and right fielder in Major League Baseball who played briefly for the Boston Red Sox in its 1910 season. Listed at 6 ft 0 in (1.83 m), 170 lb. (77 kg), he batted and threw right-handed.

Born in Oakland, California, Moskiman attended Jefferson Grammar School for eight years, and graduated from Oakland High School. Afterwards, he was a medical student at Cooper Medical College but never truly became a doctor because he chose to play ball instead.

Moskiman spent parts of 13 seasons playing minor-league and independent-league ball, pitching more often than not and obtaining considerably good results in the California League, where he posted a 31–13 record in 1909 for the Oakland Commuters. Previously, he won 29 games for Oakland in 1901 and 22 for the Stockton Millers in 1908.

As a result, newspapers like the Los Angeles Times bestowed his degree on him in advance by frequently referring to him as 'Doctor Moskiman', or simply 'Doc', a nickname given to a player to be wise, e.g., Doc Moskiman, who gave far more analysis to his pitching than most other pitchers.

In five major-league games with the Red Sox, Moskiman was a .111 hitter (1-for-9) with one run scored and one run batted in. He made no errors in 18 fielding chances.

After his playing days, Moskiman worked as a traveling salesman for the sporting goods manufacturer A. G. Spalding & Bros. and later was the retail manager of an athletic-goods store.

In between, Moskiman was a long time resident of San Leandro, California, where he died in 1953 at the age of 73.
