= Dave Skeels =

American baseball player (1891–1926)

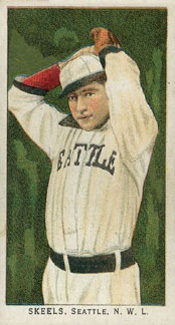
- Pitcher
- Born: December 29, 1891; Addy, Washington, U.S.
- Died: December 2, 1926 (aged 34); Spokane, Washington, U.S.
- Batted: Left Threw: Right

MLB debut
- September 14, 1910, for the Detroit Tigers

Last MLB appearance
- September 14, 1910, for the Detroit Tigers

Career statistics
- Win–loss record: 0–0
- Earned run average: 12.00
- Strikeouts: 2
- Stats at Baseball Reference

Teams
- Detroit Tigers (1910)

David L. Skeels (December 29, 1891 – December 2, 1926) was an American baseball pitcher. He appeared in one game for the 1910 Detroit Tigers.

Skeels attended Gonzaga University, where he played college baseball for the Bulldogs in 1910.
