= Que Ironía =

Que Ironía may refer to:

- "Que Ironía", 1999 song by Rodrigo, also covered by Andy Andy
- "Que Ironía", 2006 song by Mary Ann Acevedo from the album Mary Ann

== See also ==
- Ironia (disambiguation)
