= Cy Ferry =

American baseball player (1877–1938)

- Pitcher
- Born: September 1, 1877; Hudson, New York, U.S.
- Died: September 27, 1938 (aged 60); Pittsfield, Massachusetts, U.S.
- Batted: Right Threw: Right

MLB debut
- May 12, 1904, for the Detroit Tigers

Last MLB appearance
- August 4, 1905, for the Cleveland Naps

MLB statistics
- Win–loss record: 0–1
- Earned run average: 7.20
- Strikeouts: 6
- Stats at Baseball Reference

Teams
- Detroit Tigers (1904); Cleveland Naps (1905)

Alfred Joseph "Cy" Ferry (September 1, 1877 – September 27, 1938) was an American pitcher in Major League Baseball who played for two seasons. He pitched in three games for the Detroit Tigers during the 1904 Detroit Tigers season and in one game for the Cleveland Naps during the 1905 Cleveland Naps season. His brother, Jack Ferry, was also a major league pitcher.

A graduate of Manhattan College, Ferry began his professional career in 1899 with the Albany Senators and Springfield Ponies, then played for the Meriden Miler in 1901. He was promoted to the Buffalo Bisons the following year and had a 20-5 win-loss record in 31 games. Ferry spent a second season with Buffalo, and was close to signing with the Pittsburgh Pirates at season's end. Instead, Buffalo traded him along with Matty McIntyre to the Detroit Tigers for Ernie Courtney, Rube Kisinger, and Sport McAllister.

Ferry made his major league debut for the Tigers on May 12, 1904 and had a 6.23 earned run average (ERA) in three games for the Tigers that season. He spent most of 1904 with the Minneapolis Millers where he had a 6-7 win-loss record in 19 games. After being released by Minneapolis, Ferry spent 1905 with the Portland Giants and Montreal Royals before being purchased by the Cleveland Naps. He pitched in one game for them, allowing three runs in two innings before being released shortly after the game.

After one more season in the minor leagues, Ferry became a scout. While scouting for the Tigers' organization, he talked the Milwaukee Brewers into signing Ray Schalk, who eventually made it to the Baseball Hall of Fame. He died in 1938 at the age of 60.
