= Rube Kisinger =

American baseball player (1876–1941)

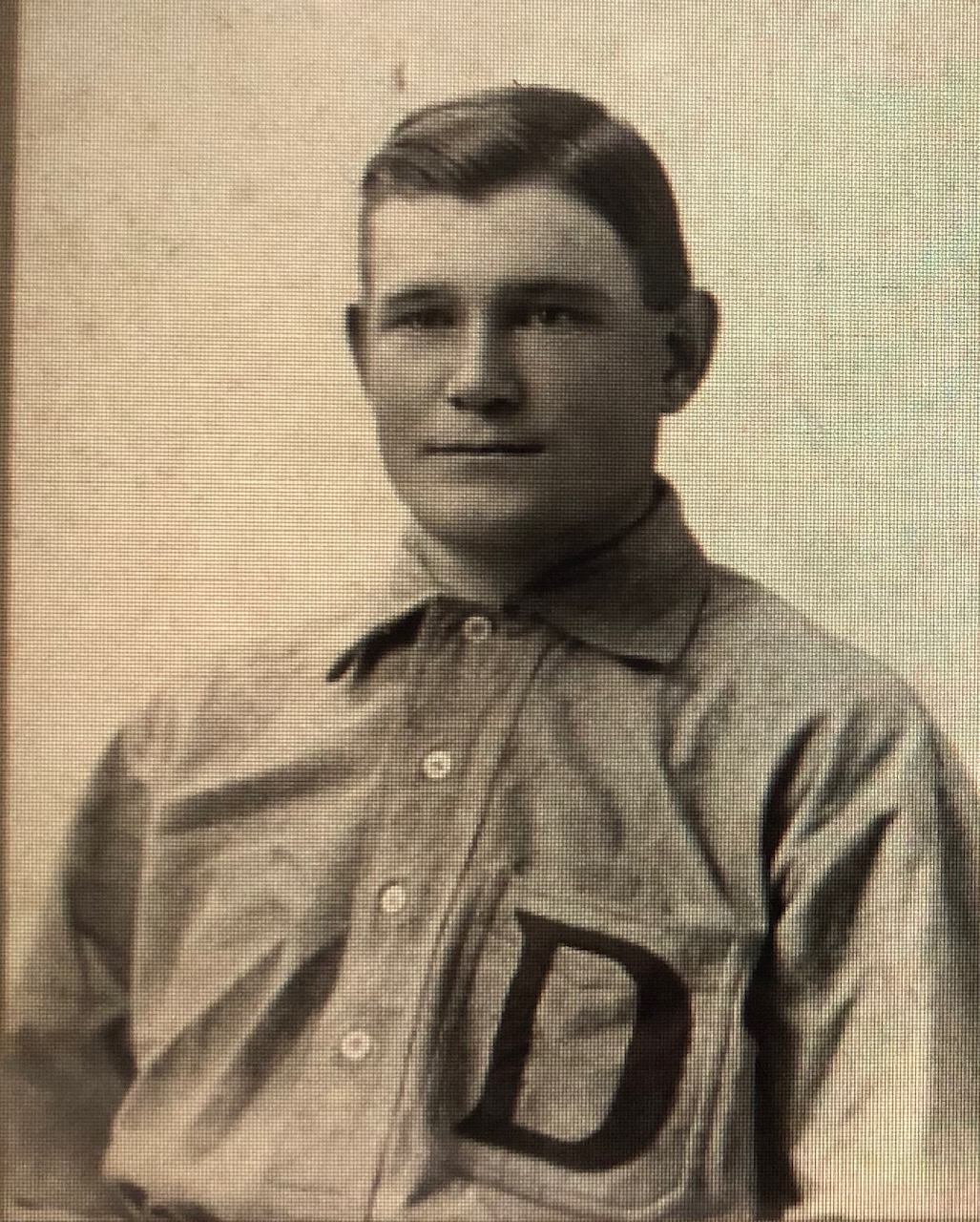
- Rube Kisinger, August 1903
- Pitcher
- Born: December 13, 1876; Adrian, Michigan, U.S.
- Died: July 14, 1941 (aged 64); Huron, Ohio, U.S.
- Batted: Right Threw: Right

MLB debut
- September 10, 1902, for the Detroit Tigers

Last MLB appearance
- September 24, 1903, for the Detroit Tigers

MLB statistics
- Win–loss record: 9–12
- Earned run average: 3.00
- Strikeouts: 40
- Stats at Baseball Reference

Teams
- Detroit Tigers (1902–1903)

Charles Samuel "Rube" Kisinger (December 13, 1876 – July 17, 1941), sometimes spelled "Kissinger", was an American right-handed baseball pitcher.

Kisinger played professional baseball from 1901 to 1916, including two years in Major League Baseball with the Detroit Tigers in 1902 and 1903. He compiled a 9–12 record with a 3.00 earned run average (ERA) in 21 major league games.

Kisinger also played for the Buffalo Bisons in the Eastern League from 1904 to 1910, leading the club to pennants in 1904 and 1907. He had three consecutive 20-win seasons for Buffalo, compiling a record of 67–38 from 1904 to 1906. He concluded his pitching career playing for several teams in the Southern Association from 1912 to 1916.

== Early years ==
Kisinger was born in 1876 in Adrian, Michigan. He attended Adrian High School and Adrian College, playing baseball at both schools.

== Professional baseball ==
=== Toledo, Detroit and Toronto (1901–03) ===
Kisinger began playing professional baseball in 1901 with the Toledo club in the Western Association. He appeared in one game for Toledo, pitched nine innings, allowed seven runs, 12 hits and three walks, and was the losing pitcher.

Kisinger debuted with the Tigers at the end of the 1902 season on September 10, 1902. As a 25-year-old rookie, Kisinger appeared in five games (all complete games) and had a record of 2–3 with an ERA of 3.12 (Adjusted ERA+ of 120).

In 1903, Kisinger played for Detroit and for the Toronto Maple Leafs of the Eastern League. He appeared in 19 games for Toronto, compiling an 11–7 record. He appeared in 16 games (including 14 complete games) for Detroit and had a record of 7–9 with an ERA of 2.96 in 118 2/3 innings pitched. Kisinger appeared in his last major league game on September 24, 1903.

=== Buffalo and Jersey City (1904–11) ===
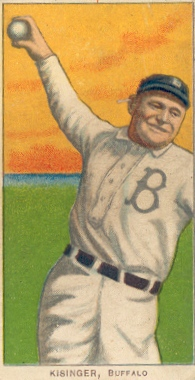
T206 tobacco card, 1909

In October 1903, Kisinger was traded by the Tigers with other players to the Buffalo Bisons of the Eastern League for Cy Ferry and Matty McIntyre. In 1904, Kisinger appeared in 38 games for Buffalo and compiled a 24–11 record in 289 innings pitched. He followed in 1905 with a 20–15 record in 317 innings and in 1906 with a 23–12 record in 319 innings. In May 1907, after Kisinger pitched a one-hitter against Jersey City, with the one hit coming on a bunt, The Buffalo Enquirer wrote: "To Rube Kisinger must be given credit for being the star twirler in the Eastern League. Time and again has he proved this, and his sunny disposition, his German – coupled with his ability to play the game makes him the valuable player that he is to the Buffalo baseball club. All honor to the Dutchman from Michigan."

In June 1910, after nine-and-a-half years with the Buffalo club, Kisinger was traded to the Jersey City team in the Eastern League in exchange for George Merritt. At the time of the trade, The Buffalo Courier wrote: "There is not a doubt in the world that Kisinger is a great pitcher. He has everything that a first-class twirler needs, but of late years he has been such a notorious in-and-outer that even some of the most loyal fans soured on him. Rube started here like a whirlwind and became one of the most popular players that ever wore the home white, but as years passed he began to show indifference if the rest of the team went loosely with the result that he became known as a great 'front runner,' a pitcher who would pitch his head off if his team was leading, but who shirked if the other team got the jump on him."

Kisinger played for the Jersey City during the last half of 1910 and in 1911. During the 1911 season, he appeared in 35 games for Jersey City and compiled a 7–13 record in 182 1/3 inning pitched.

While playing for Toronto, Buffalo, and Jersey City, Kisinger set an International League (the Eastern League later became the International League) record with 31 shutouts.

=== Southern Association (1912–16) ===
Kisinger played for the last five years of his baseball career in the Southern Association. He played during these years for the Memphis Chickasaws (1912–1913), Atlanta Crackers (1914), New Orleans Pelicans (1914, 1916), and Nashville Volunteers (1915). He was 39 years old when he concluded his playing career in 1916. He developed a reputation as a spitballer in the Southern Association. In 1915, he compiled a 16–8 record in 24 games for Nashville.

== Later years ==
In his later years, Kisinger lived in Adrian, Michigan, and was employed as a bridge foreman by the New York Central Railroad. In July 1941, Kisinger died at age 64 while working on a railroad bridge job in Huron, Ohio. He died instantly on being struck by the front engine of a westbound train. The death was ruled accidental.

The International League Hall of Fame inducted Kisinger as a member in 2009. He played nine seasons in the Eastern League (predecessor to the International League) from 1903 to 1911 and compiled a 150–108 record with a league-record 31 shutouts.
