= Billy Sullivan (1900s catcher) =

American baseball player and manager (1875–1965)

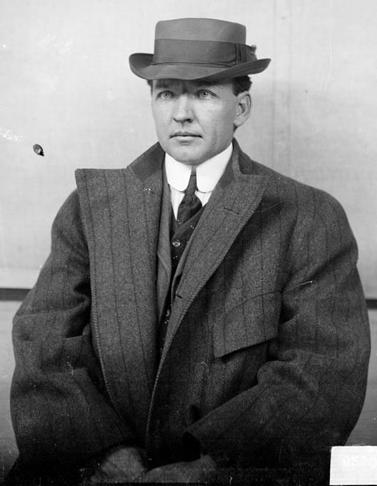
- Sullivan of the Chicago White Sox in 1909
- Catcher / Manager
- Born: February 1, 1875; Oakland, Jefferson County, Wisconsin, U.S.
- Died: January 28, 1965 (aged 89); Newberg, Oregon, U.S.
- Batted: Right Threw: Right

MLB debut
- September 13, 1899, for the Boston Beaneaters

Last MLB appearance
- April 15, 1916, for the Detroit Tigers

MLB statistics
- Batting average: .213
- Home runs: 21
- Runs batted in: 378
- Managerial record: 78–74
- Winning %: .513
- Stats at Baseball Reference

Teams
- As player: Boston Beaneaters (1899–1900); Chicago White Sox (1901–1912, 1914); Detroit Tigers (1916); As manager: Chicago White Sox (1909)

Career highlights and awards
- World Series champion (1906)

William Joseph Sullivan, Sr. (February 1, 1875 – January 28, 1965) was an American professional baseball player and manager. He played as a catcher in Major League Baseball, most notably as a member of the Chicago White Sox with whom he won a World Series championship in 1906. Although he was a relatively weak hitter, he sustained a sixteen-year playing career by being one of the best defensive catchers of his era.

Sullivan's reputation as a defensive standout is enhanced because of the era in which he played. In the Deadball Era, catchers played a huge defensive role, given the large number of bunts and stolen base attempts, as well as the difficulty of handling the spitball pitchers who dominated pitching staffs. He had to catch every type of pitch imaginable, such as shine balls, spitballs, knuckleballs, and emery balls.

== Early life ==
William Joseph Sullivan was born on February 1, 1875, in the town of Oakland, Wisconsin, to Irish immigrant farmers. He attended Fort Atkinson High School, where he played mainly as an infielder until their regular catcher could not play due to an injury. Sullivan substituted and excelled; so much so that he began being scouted by a local amateur team.

After his graduation from high school, Sullivan played for an independent team located in Edgewater, Wisconsin. He played on his first professional team in 1896 for the Cedar Rapids Bunnies of the Western Association, a Class-B minor league. He stayed in the Western Association for the 1897 season, playing for the Dubuque, Iowa, representative. In 124 games played that season, he batted just .216, but did hit seven home runs and stole 27 bases.

Sullivan then transferred to the Class-A Western League in 1898 to play for the Columbus Buckeyes, also referred to as the Senators, and had a .276 batting average in 68 games played. He stayed with the Buckeyes to begin the 1899 season, though he later moved with the team to Grand Rapids, Michigan; they then became known as the Prodigals. He was hitting .306 after 83 games when he was sold to the Boston Beaneaters of the National League for $1000.

== Major-league career ==
Sullivan made his major league debut with the Beaneaters on September 13, 1899, at the age of 24, and became their regular catcher, appearing in 22 games the rest of season. On September 27, against the Washington Senators, he hit his first major league home run; a three-run home run in the bottom of the fifth inning off of Bill Magee. In 1900, Sullivan hit 8 home runs, the fifth highest total in the National League.

Sullivan then joined the Chicago White Sox of the American League in 1901. He played as catcher in the American League's first game as a major league, an 8-2 Chicago victory over Cleveland on April 24, 1901. He helped guide the White Sox pitching staff to the lowest team earned run average in the league as they went on to win the American League championship. Sullivan's pitch-calling skills were evident in 1904 as the White Sox led the league with 26 shutouts. He caught for two twenty-game winning pitchers in 1905, with Nick Altrock winning 23 games and Frank Owen winning 21 games. Frank Smith added 19 wins and Doc White provided another 17 victories as the White Sox once again led the league in earned run average. The team battled the Philadelphia Athletics in a tight pennant race and were tied for first place with 11 games left in the season before faltering to finish the season in second place.

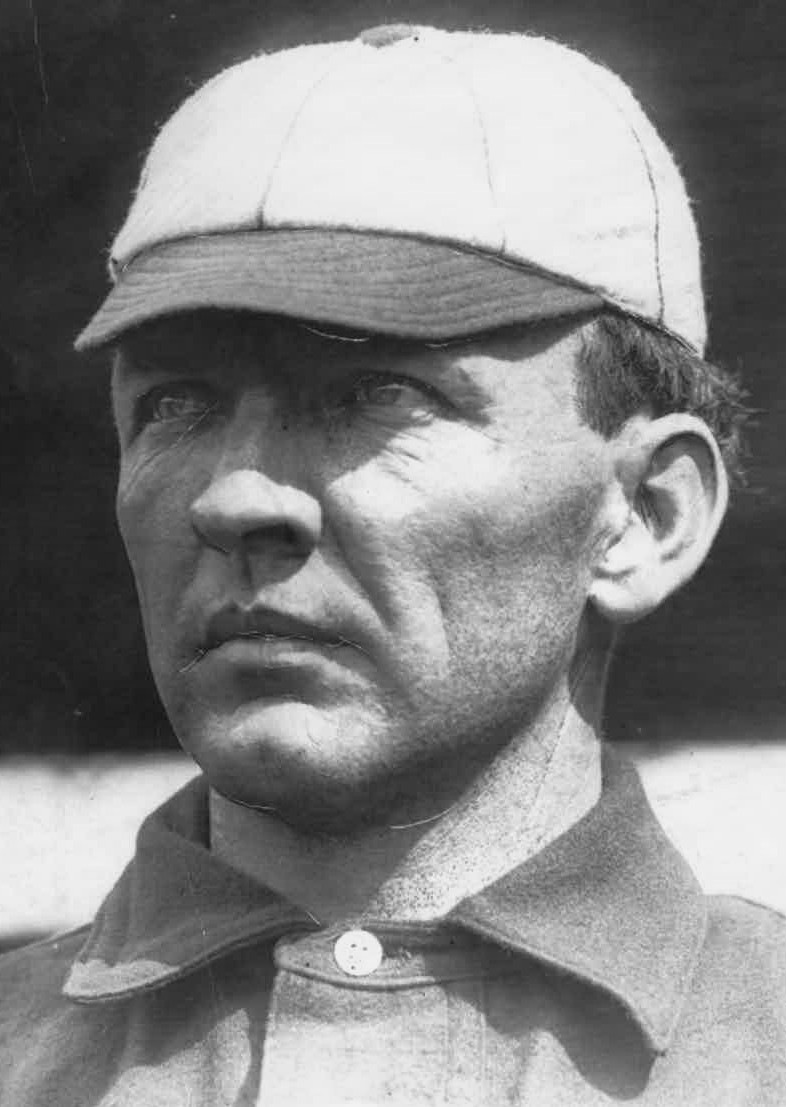
Sullivan as a member of the Chicago White Sox, circa 1906–1911.

Sullivan was a member of the 1906 White Sox team that became known as the Hitless Wonders when they won the American League pennant despite posting the lowest team batting average in the league. The team had been in fourth place by the end of July, 7 1/2 games behind the defending champion Athletics, when they went on a 19-game winning streak that drove them into first place. No American League team would surpass the 19-game winning streak for almost 100 years until the 2002 Oakland Athletics won 20 consecutive games. The team made up for their lack of hitting prowess by leading the league in walks, hit batsmen and sacrifice hits. Sullivan tied for the team lead in home runs with two. He led American League catchers in baserunners caught stealing, finished second in putouts and assists and guided the White Sox pitching staff to a league-leading 32 shutouts and the second lowest earned run average in the league. The White Sox then defeated their cross-town rivals, the heavily favored Chicago Cubs in the 1906 World Series. Sullivan was literally hitless for the "Hitless Wonders," going 0-for-21 at the plate in the Series.

In 1907, Sullivan caught for three twenty-game winning pitchers, as Doc White won 27 games, Ed Walsh won 24 games and Frank Smith won 23 games. The White Sox once again led the league in earned run average, however, they fell to third in the season standings. Sullivan's catching credentials were embellished by his association with future Baseball Hall of Fame member, Walsh, who would win 40 games in 1908, as the White Sox once again led the league in shutouts. The White Sox were in contention until losing the final game of the season to the eventual American League champions, the Detroit Tigers. He served as a player-manager for the White Sox in 1909, guiding the team to a fourth-place finish. The following season, Hugh Duffy took over as manager and Sullivan returned to catching.

Sullivan was the White Sox catcher on July 1, 1910, when the team inaugurated their new stadium, Comiskey Park, named after the team owner, Charles Comiskey. On August 24, 1910, Sullivan caught three baseballs thrown by Ed Walsh from a window at the top of the Washington Monument as a publicity stunt, matching the feat by Washington catcher Gabby Street two years earlier. By 1912, the 37-year-old Sullivan's performance began to decline as future Hall of Fame member, Ray Schalk, emerged as his successor. He spent the 1913 and 1914 seasons as a coach, tutoring Schalk before being given his unconditional release on February 15, 1915.

Sullivan returned to the minor leagues in 1915, playing one season for the Minneapolis Millers, helping them win the American Association pennant. He rejoined the major leagues in 1916, appearing in one game with the Detroit Tigers, before retiring as a player at the age of 41.

While Sullivan was not a very good hitter, it was his performance as a fielder that garnered him high praise from his peers. Ty Cobb, Hall of Fame outfielder of the Detroit Tigers and former all-time major league leader in stolen bases, once described him as the hardest catcher on which to attempt a steal.

== Managerial record ==
| Team | Year | Regular season | | | | | Postseason | | | |
| Team | Year | Games | Won | Lost | Win % | Finish | Won | Lost | Win % | Result |
|---|---|---|---|---|---|---|---|---|---|---|
| CWS | 1909 | 152 | 78 | 74 | .513 | 4th in AL | – | – | – | – |
| Total | | 152 | 78 | 74 | .513 | | 0 | 0 | – | |

== Career statistics ==
In a sixteen-year major league career, Sullivan played in 1,147 games, accumulating 777 hits in 3,647 at bats for a .213 career batting average along with 21 home runs, 378 runs batted in and an on-base percentage of .254. He led American League catchers three times in fielding percentage and ended his career with a .976 average, which was 12 points above the league average during his playing career. Sullivan also led American League catchers twice in baserunners caught stealing and caught stealing percentage, and once in assists. His 952 baserunners caught stealing ranks him 11th on the all-time list for major league catchers. Sullivan also ranks 11th overall among major league catchers in shutouts caught during his career. He was also durable, leading league catchers in games played three times, while consistently within the top three most of his career.

== Later life ==
After his retirement from baseball, the Jefferson County, Wisconsin, native retired in Newberg, Oregon, where he farmed twenty acres of land and became the president of a local fruit growers' association. Upon the occasion of his induction into the Wisconsin Athletic Hall of Fame in 1956, Sullivan was honored with a plaque at the Milwaukee County Stadium. He died of a heart ailment on January 28, 1965, at the age of 89. Although news reports at the time of Sullivan's death credited him as the inventor of the catcher's chest protector, this was disputed by author Peter Morris in his book, Catcher, in which he states that catchers first began using chest protectors during the 1880s. Sullivan did however, receive a United States patent in 1908 for an inflatable, contoured chest protector, which protected his body better and, thanks to hinging, allowed more freedom of movement than the normal model.

His son, Billy Sullivan, Jr., also became a major league catcher. When Billy Sullivan Jr. caught for the Detroit Tigers in the 1940 World Series, the Sullivans became the first father and son to have played in the World Series.

== See also ==
- List of Major League Baseball player–managers
