= Ironia, New Jersey =

Populated place in Morris County, New Jersey, US

- Unincorporated community
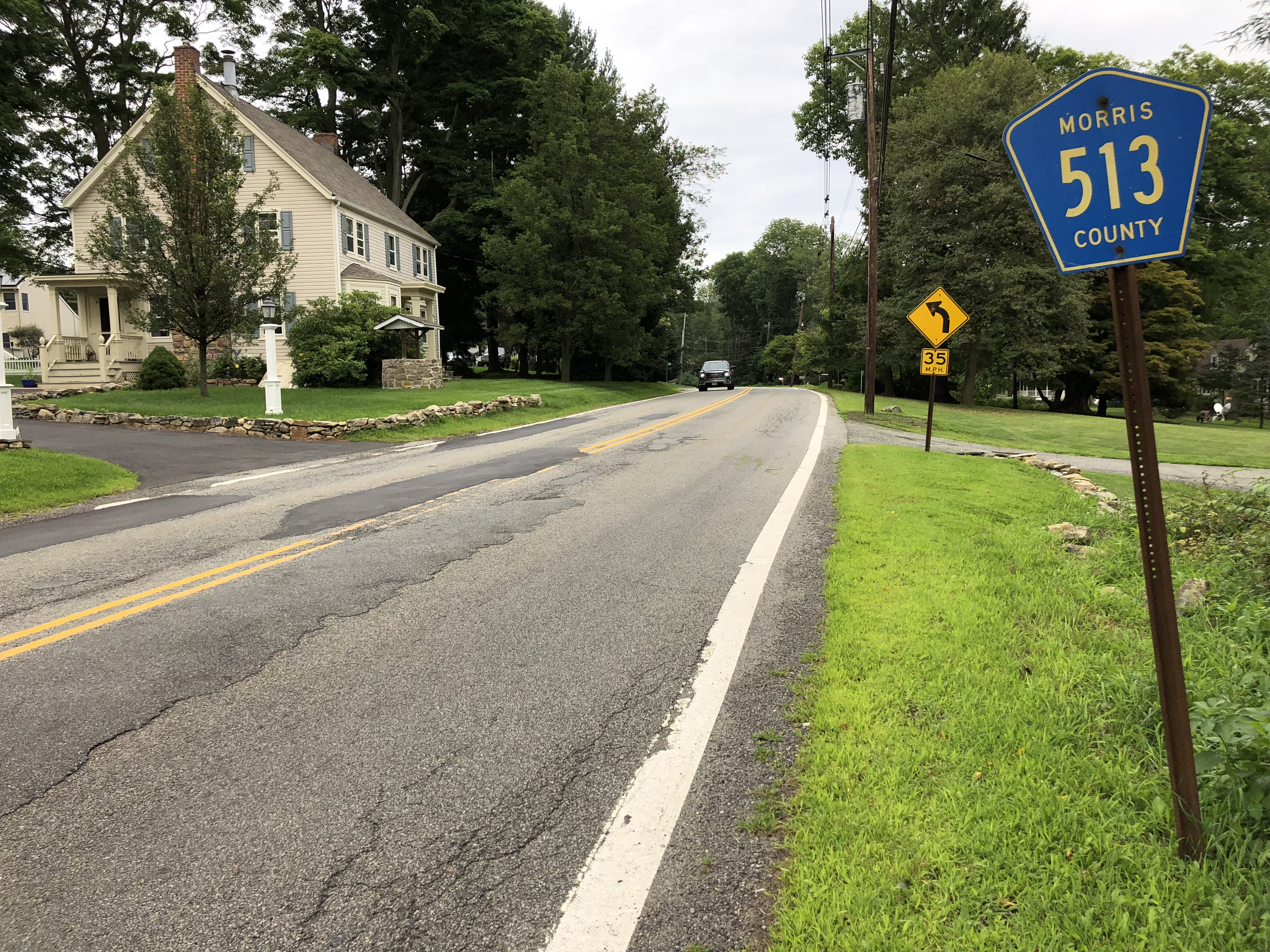
- CR 513 northbound through Ironia

- Ironia's location in Morris County (Inset: Morris County in New Jersey) Ironia (New Jersey) Ironia (the United States)
- Coordinates: 40°49′22″N 74°37′33″W
- Country: United States
- State: New Jersey
- County: Morris
- Elevation: 899 ft (274 m)
- Time zone: UTC−05:00 (Eastern (EST))
  - Summer (DST): UTC−04:00 (EDT)
- ZIP Code: 07845
- Area codes: 862 & 973
- GNIS feature ID: 877360

Ironia is an unincorporated community located within Randolph Township, in Morris County, in the U.S. state of New Jersey. Ironia is 5.4 miles (8.7 km) southwest of Dover. Ironia has a post office with ZIP Code 07845.

== Notable people ==
People who were born in, residents of, or otherwise closely associated with Ironia include:

- Sailor Stroud, Major League Baseball pitcher
