= Hub Pernoll =

American baseball player (1888–1944)

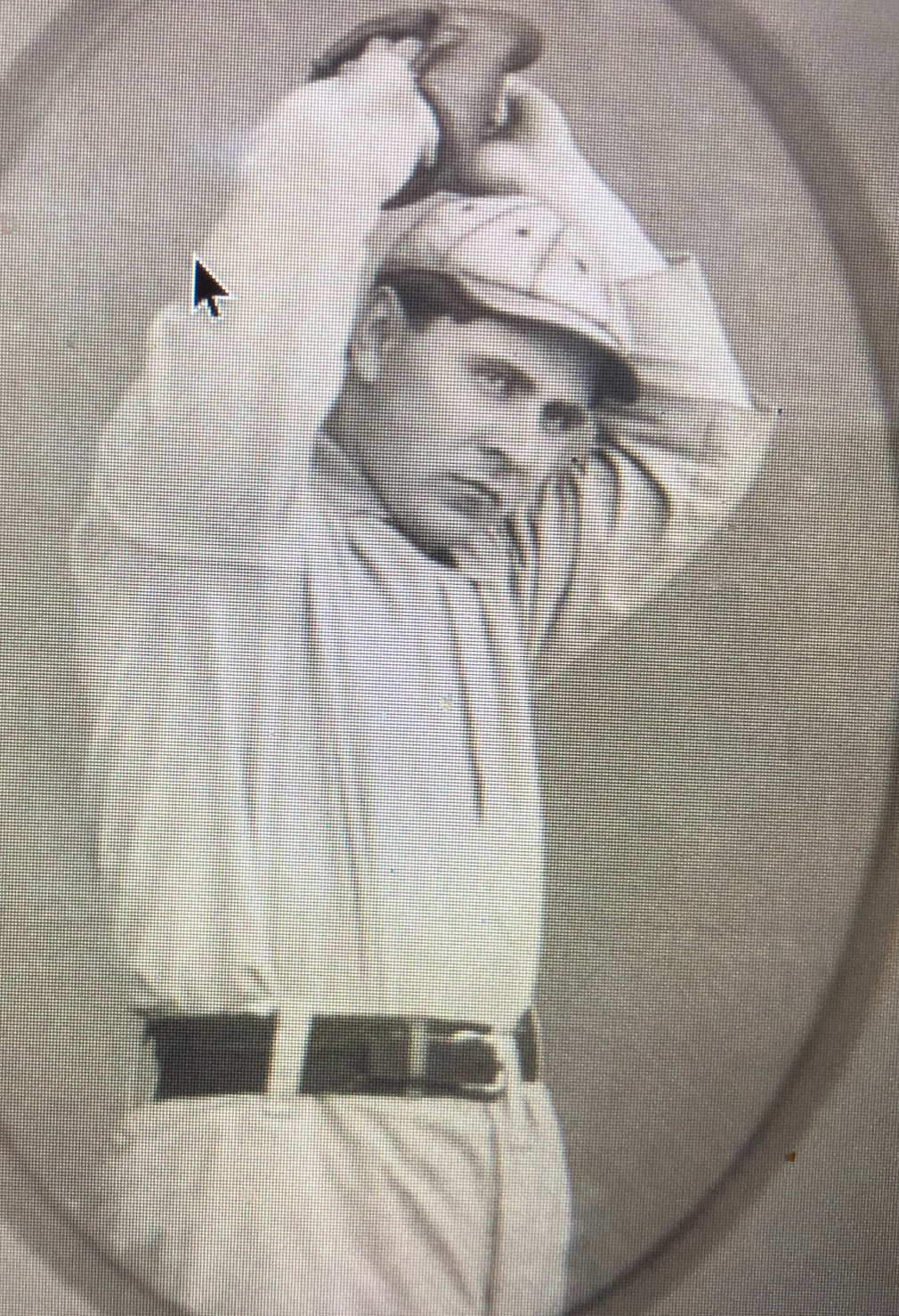
- 1911 tobacco card of Pernoll
- Pitcher
- Born: March 14, 1888; Applegate, Oregon, U.S.
- Died: February 18, 1944 (aged 55); Grants Pass, Oregon, U.S.
- Batted: Right Threw: Left

MLB debut
- April 25, 1910, for the Detroit Tigers

Last MLB appearance
- May 13, 1912, for the Detroit Tigers

MLB statistics
- Win–loss record: 4–3
- Earned run average: 3.39
- Strikeouts: 28
- Stats at Baseball Reference

Teams
- Detroit Tigers (1910, 1912)

Henry Huston Pernoll (March 14, 1888 – February 18, 1944), also variously known by the nicknames "Hub", "Piano Legs", "Jud", "Bud, "Buddy", and "Busher", was an American left-handed pitcher in baseball.

Pernoll played professional baseball for nine years from 1907 to 1915, including parts of the 1910 and 1912 seasons in Major League Baseball for the Detroit Tigers. He appeared in 14 major league games and compiled a 4–3 record with a 3.39 earned run average (ERA) in 63-2/3 inning pitched.

A native of Oregon, Pernoll also played in the Pacific Coast League for the Portland Beavers (1907–1908), Oakland Oaks (1911–1913), and San Francisco Seals (1913–1915).

== Early years ==
Pernoll was born in 1888 on the Pernoll family homestead at Applegate, Oregon. He began pitching for the local team in Applegate. He then attracted the attention of the team in Grants Pass, Oregon, where he played in 1906 and 1907. He was described as "one of the best pitchers that ever threw a ball on any Southern Oregon diamond."

== Professional baseball ==
Pernoll joined the Portland Beavers of the Pacific Coast League (PCL) in July 1907. He made his debut under the name "Busher Pernoll" on July 24, 1907, shutting out the Los Angeles Angels. At the time, The Oregon Daily Journal described him as a short, stout 19-year-old who had learned to throw a curve in the mountains near Grants Pass, Oregon.

Pernoll also pitched for the Aberdeen Black Cats in 1908 and 1909. Playing against his former Portland teammates on May 20, 1909, he threw a complete-game shutout and also hit a double to bat in the winning run. He won 20 of his first 28 games in 1909, leading to a bidding war among major league teams for his services. In August 1909, the Detroit Tigers paid $4,000 for Pernoll to join them in 1910. He finished the 1909 season in Aberdeen with a 25-15 record.

In 1910, Pernoll appeared in 11 games, five as a starter, for the Tigers. In his first start, he pitched a one-hit complete-game against the St. Louis Browns on April 27, 1910. He compiled a 4–3 record with a 2.96 ERA in 54-2/3 innings pitched during the 1910 campaign. In March 1910, the Detroit Free Press wrote: "Pernoll is an extremely stocky pitcher, burly as George Mullin ever was before he adopted his present scheme of training. He pitches with a peculiar short jerk motion, using no body swing, but getting the speed. He does it with his muscles alone."

Prior to the 1911 season, the Oakland Oaks of the Pacific Coast League purchased Pernoll's release from the Tigers for $4,000.

He returned briefly to the Tigers in 1912 and appeared in three games, all in relief, compiling a 6.00 ERA. He appeared in his final major league game on May 13, 1912. He rejoined the Oakland Oaks in June 1912. He continued with the Oaks through the 1912 season, compiling a 4–11 record in 19 games.

Pernoll started the 1913 season with Oakland and ended it with the San Francisco Seals. In 39 games played for both Oakland and San Francisco, he compiled a 15–14 record in 246 innings pitched. In 1914, he appeared in 50 games for the Seals and compiled a 22-22 record with a career-low 2.09 ERA.

He also pitched in 1916 and from 1919 to 1927 for the Grants Pass team with which he played at the beginning of his career.

== Later years ==
After retiring from baseball, Pernoll lived in Grants Pass, Oregon. He operated the Owl Billiard Parlor in Grants Pass for 25 years starting in approximately 1919. He died from a heart ailment in 1944 at Josephine General Hospital in Grants Pass at age 55.
