= Ed Summers =

American baseball player (1884–1953)

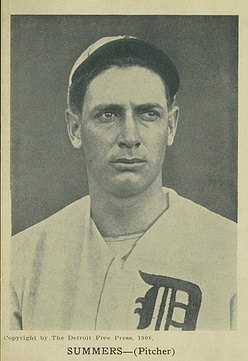
- Summers in 1908
- Pitcher
- Born: December 5, 1884; Ladoga, Indiana, U.S.
- Died: May 12, 1953 (aged 68); Indianapolis, Indiana, U.S.
- Batted: Both Threw: Right

MLB debut
- April 16, 1908, for the Detroit Tigers

Last MLB appearance
- June 1, 1912, for the Detroit Tigers

MLB statistics
- Win–loss record: 68-45
- Earned run average: 2.42
- Strikeouts: 362
- Stats at Baseball Reference

Teams
- Detroit Tigers (1908–1912)

Oren Edgar Summers (December 5, 1884 – May 12, 1953), nicknamed "Kickapoo Ed", was an American right-handed pitcher in Major League Baseball who played five seasons with the Detroit Tigers from 1908 to 1912.

== Biography ==
Summers was born in Ladoga, Indiana, and attended Wabash College in Crawfordsville, Indiana. He began his playing career in the American Association before joining the Tigers in the American League in 1908.

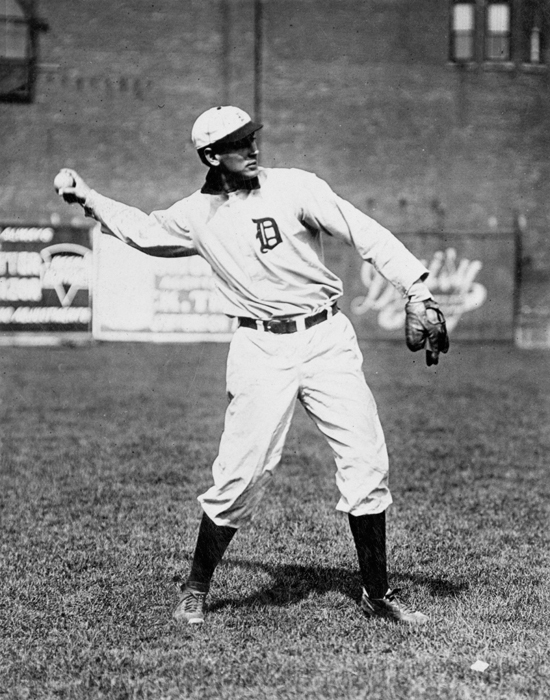
Ed Summers, Detroit Tigers pitcher

In his rookie season, Summers emerged as the Tigers' best pitcher, finishing with a 1.64 ERA in 301 innings pitched and a 24–12 win–loss record. On September 25, 1908, the Tigers were two games back of the Cleveland Naps for the AL pennant and were scheduled to play a doubleheader. Summers threw two complete game victories, winning the second game 1–0 after throwing 10 shutout innings. Summers is still the only player to have pitched a pair of complete game victories and throw more than eighteen innings. The Tigers went on to win the pennant and returned to the World Series for a rematch against the Chicago Cubs.

In the 1908 World Series, Summers pitched in Games 1 and 4, losing both times to Three Finger Brown. That season his 24 wins tied for second place in the AL behind Ed Walsh's 40, and his 1.64 ERA remains the Tigers' single season record.

On July 16, 1909, Summers pitched 18 scoreless innings of a tie game against the Washington Senators at Bennett Park. He finished the 1909 season at 19–9 and the Tigers recaptured the pennant. In the 1909 World Series, he started Game 3, but could not finish the first inning, allowing five unearned runs to the Pittsburgh Pirates. He returned for Game 5 but lost to Babe Adams.

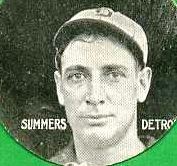
Ed Summers, Colgan's Chips disc

Summers played three additional seasons before rheumatism ended his playing career at age 27. In 138 career games, he had a 68–45 record with a 2.42 ERA, including 79 complete games and 9 shutouts in 999 innings.

He died from a cerebral hemorrhage at age 68 in 1953 in Indianapolis.

In spite of his nickname, Summers did not identify as Native American and consistently identified himself as white in the United States census and in his draft registration records. Newspaper accounts from during and after his career do not describe him as having Kickapoo ancestry.

== See also ==
- Best pitching seasons by a Detroit Tiger
