= Frank Lange =

American baseball player (1883–1945)

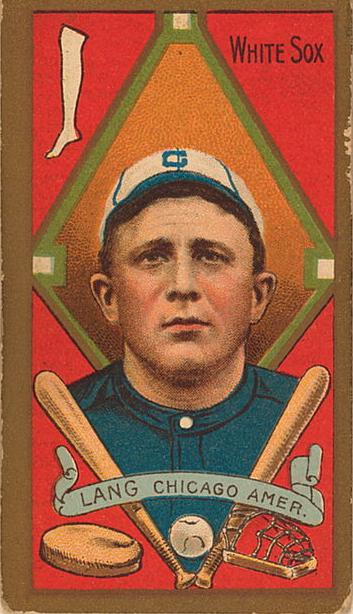
- Pitcher
- Born: October 28, 1883; Columbus, Wisconsin, U.S.
- Died: December 26, 1945 (aged 62); Madison, Wisconsin, U.S.
- Batted: Right Threw: Right

MLB debut
- May 16, 1910, for the Chicago White Sox

Last MLB appearance
- July 20, 1913, for the Chicago White Sox

MLB statistics
- Win–loss record: 28–25
- Earned run average: 2.96
- Strikeouts: 318
- Stats at Baseball Reference

Teams
- Chicago White Sox (1910–1913)

Frank Herman Lange (October 28, 1883 – December 26, 1945) was an American pitcher and pinch hitter in Major League Baseball. He played for the Chicago White Sox.

Lange died in a hospital in Madison, Wisconsin.
