= Frank Browning (baseball) =

American baseball player (1882–1948)

- Pitcher
- Born: October 29, 1882; Falmouth, Kentucky, U.S.
- Died: May 19, 1948 (aged 65); San Antonio, Texas, U.S.
- Batted: Right Threw: Right

MLB debut
- April 16, 1910, for the Detroit Tigers

Last MLB appearance
- May 30, 1910, for the Detroit Tigers

MLB statistics
- Win–loss record: 2–2
- Earned run average: 2.57
- Strikeouts: 16
- Stats at Baseball Reference

Teams
- Detroit Tigers (1910)

Frank "Dutch" Browning (October 29, 1882 – May 19, 1948) was an American Major League Baseball (MLB) player. He played one major league season for the Detroit Tigers in 1910. In 1909, he led the minor leagues in wins while pitching for the San Francisco Seals.

Born in Falmouth, Kentucky, Browning attended Georgetown College in Kentucky and began his baseball career in 1906 with minor leagues. In 1909, the Detroit Tigers drafted Browning in a rule 5 draft.

In the mid-1920s, Browning was part of a vaudeville quartet.

Browning died of burns received in an accidental house fire in San Antonio, Texas.
