= Ben Hunt (baseball) =

American baseball player (1888–1927)

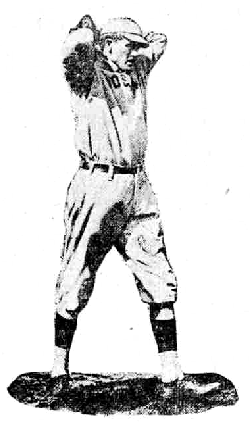
- Pitcher
- Born: November 10, 1888; Eufaula, Oklahoma
- Died: September 27, 1927 (aged 38); Greybull, Wyoming, U.S.
- Batted: Left Threw: Left

MLB debut
- August 24, 1910, for the Boston Red Sox

Last MLB appearance
- April 19, 1913, for the St. Louis Cardinals

MLB statistics
- Win–loss record: 2–4
- Earned run average: 3.95
- Strikeouts: 25
- Stats at Baseball Reference

Teams
- Boston Red Sox (1910); St. Louis Cardinals (1913)

Benjamin Franklin Hunt (November 10, 1888 – September 27, 1927) was an American starting pitcher in Major League Baseball who played for the Boston Red Sox (1910) and St. Louis Cardinals (1913). Listed at 6 ft 5 in (1.96 m), 190 lb., Hunt batted and threw left-handed. He was born in Eufaula, Oklahoma.

In a two-season career, Hunt posted a 2–4 record with 25 strikeouts and a 3.95 earned run average in nine appearances, including eight starts, three complete games, and 54 2/3 innings of work.

Hunt died in Greybull, Wyoming at age 38.
