= Chief Chouneau =

American baseball player (1888–1946)

- Pitcher
- Born: September 2, 1889; Cloquet, Minnesota, U.S.
- Died: September 17, 1946 (aged 57); Cloquet, Minnesota, U.S.
- Batted: Right Threw: Right

MLB debut
- October 9, 1910, for the Chicago White Sox

Last MLB appearance
- October 9, 1910, for the Chicago White Sox

MLB statistics
- Win–loss record: 0–1
- Strikeouts: 1
- Earned run average: 3.38
- Stats at Baseball Reference

Teams
- Chicago White Sox (1910)

William "Chief" Chouneau (September 2, 1888 – September 17, 1946), born William Cadreau, was an American Major League Baseball pitcher who appeared in one game for the Chicago White Sox in 1910, and later played for the Negro league Chicago Union Giants. He was a member of the Fond du Lac Band of Lake Superior Chippewa in northeastern Minnesota.

A native of Cloquet, Minnesota, the 22-year-old right-hander Chouneau was the starting pitcher on the last day of the 1910 season for a Chicago White Sox club that featured Baseball Hall of Fame hurler Ed Walsh and was led by Hall of Fame manager Hugh Duffy. The opponent was a strong Detroit Tigers team that finished the year in third place. The White Sox were ahead 1–0 after five innings, but Chouneau gave up two runs in the top of the sixth and was removed from the game with one out. Pitcher Wild Bill Donovan and the Tigers won the game, 2–1. Chouneau gave up seven hits and no walks in his 5.1 innings pitched. He had one strikeout, an 0–1 record, and his ERA was 3.38. At the plate he was 0-for-1 with a walk and a hit by pitch, giving him an on-base percentage of .667.

In 1917, Chouneau pitched for the Negro league Chicago Union Giants. In his one recorded appearance, Chouneau tossed a complete game win, allowing three earned runs.

He died on the Fond du Lac Indian Reservation in 1946 at age 58.
