= Art Loudell =

American baseball player (1882–1961)

- Pitcher
- Born: April 10, 1882; Latham, Missouri, U.S.
- Died: February 19, 1961 (aged 78); Kansas City, Missouri, U.S.
- Batted: Right Threw: Right

MLB debut
- August 13, 1910, for the Detroit Tigers

Last MLB appearance
- September 24, 1910, for the Detroit Tigers

MLB statistics
- Win–loss record: 1-1
- Earned run average: 3.38
- Strikeouts: 12
- Stats at Baseball Reference

Teams
- Detroit Tigers (1910)

Arthur Loudell (April 10, 1882 – February 19, 1961) was an American pitcher in Major League Baseball. He played for the Detroit Tigers in 1910.

He was born April 10, 1882, in Latham, Missouri, to Mortiz Laudel and Emma Christiane Loesch Laudel, the youngest of their 12 children. During his baseball career, he changed the spelling of his last name to Loudell. On May 20, 1914, he married Flora Jane Hunter in Allen County, Indiana.

He died February 19, 1961, in Kansas City, Kansas and is interred at Mount Moriah Cemetery in Kansas City, Kansas.
