= Barney Reilly =

American baseball player (1884–1934)

- Second baseman
- Born: February 7, 1884; Brockton, Massachusetts, U.S.
- Died: November 15, 1934 (aged 50); St. Joseph, Missouri, U.S.
- Batted: Right Threw: Right

MLB debut
- July 2, 1909, for the Chicago White Sox

Last MLB appearance
- September 5, 1909, for the Chicago White Sox

MLB statistics
- Games played: 12
- Batting average: .200
- Runs batted in: 3
- Stats at Baseball Reference

Teams
- Chicago White Sox (1909)

Bernard Eugene Reilly (February 7, 1884 – November 15, 1934) was an American second baseman in Major League Baseball. He played for the Chicago White Sox in 1909.
