= Sailor Stroud =

American baseball player (1885–1970)

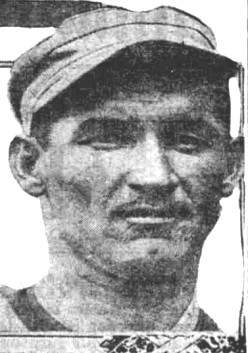
- Pitcher
- Born: March 15, 1885; Ironia, New Jersey, U.S.
- Died: April 11, 1970 (aged 85); Stockton, California, U.S.
- Batted: Right Threw: Right

MLB debut
- April 29, 1910, for the Detroit Tigers

Last MLB appearance
- June 13, 1916, for the New York Giants

MLB statistics
- Win–loss record: 18–20
- Earned run average: 2.94
- Strikeouts: 141
- Stats at Baseball Reference

Teams
- Detroit Tigers (1910); New York Giants (1915–1916)

Ralph Vivian Stroud (March 15, 1885 – April 11, 1970), sometimes referred to as Sailor Stroud, was an American baseball pitcher. He played professional baseball for 20 years from 1910 to 1929, including three years in Major League Baseball as a pitcher for the Detroit Tigers in 1910 and the New York Giants in 1915 and 1916. He appeared in 70 major league games, 41 as a starter, compiling an 18–20 win–loss record and a 2.94 earned run average (ERA) in 361 innings pitched.

== Early years ==
Stroud was born in Ironia, New Jersey, in 1885.

== Professional baseball ==
=== Minor leagues ===
Stroud was a 6 ft 0 in (1.83 m) right-handed pitcher. He began pitching in the minor leagues in 1908 at age 23 with the Trenton Tigers in the Pennsylvania-New Jersey League. He then signed with Newark of the Eastern League in 1909 and also played that year with the Williamsport Millionaires (Tri-State League) and the Macon Peaches.

=== Detroit Tigers ===
In August 1909, the Detroit Tigers purchased Stroud from the Williamsport team. He made his major league debut with the Tigers on April 29, 1910, shutting out the St. Louis Browns, 5–0. He appeared in 28 games for the Tigers during the 1910 season, 15 as a starter, compiling a 5–9 record with a 3.25 earned run average (ERA). He allowed nine home runs in 1910 — more than any other pitcher in the American League.

=== Buffalo and Sacramento ===
In April 1911, the Tigers sold Stroud to the Buffalo Bisons on an optional contract. He played with the Bisons during the 1911 and 1912 seasons, appearing in 77 games and compiling records of 12–9 in 1911 and 16–15 in 1912.

In January 1913, Stroud was purchased by the Sacramento Solons of the Pacific Coast League (PCL). During the 1913 season, Stroud appeared in a career high 51 games, 35 as a starter, compiling a 25–15 record with a 2.49 ERA and 202 strikeouts in 315 innings pitched. In 1914, Stroud had another strong season for the Solons, with a 20–18 record and a 2.01 ERA in 331 innings.

=== New York Giants ===
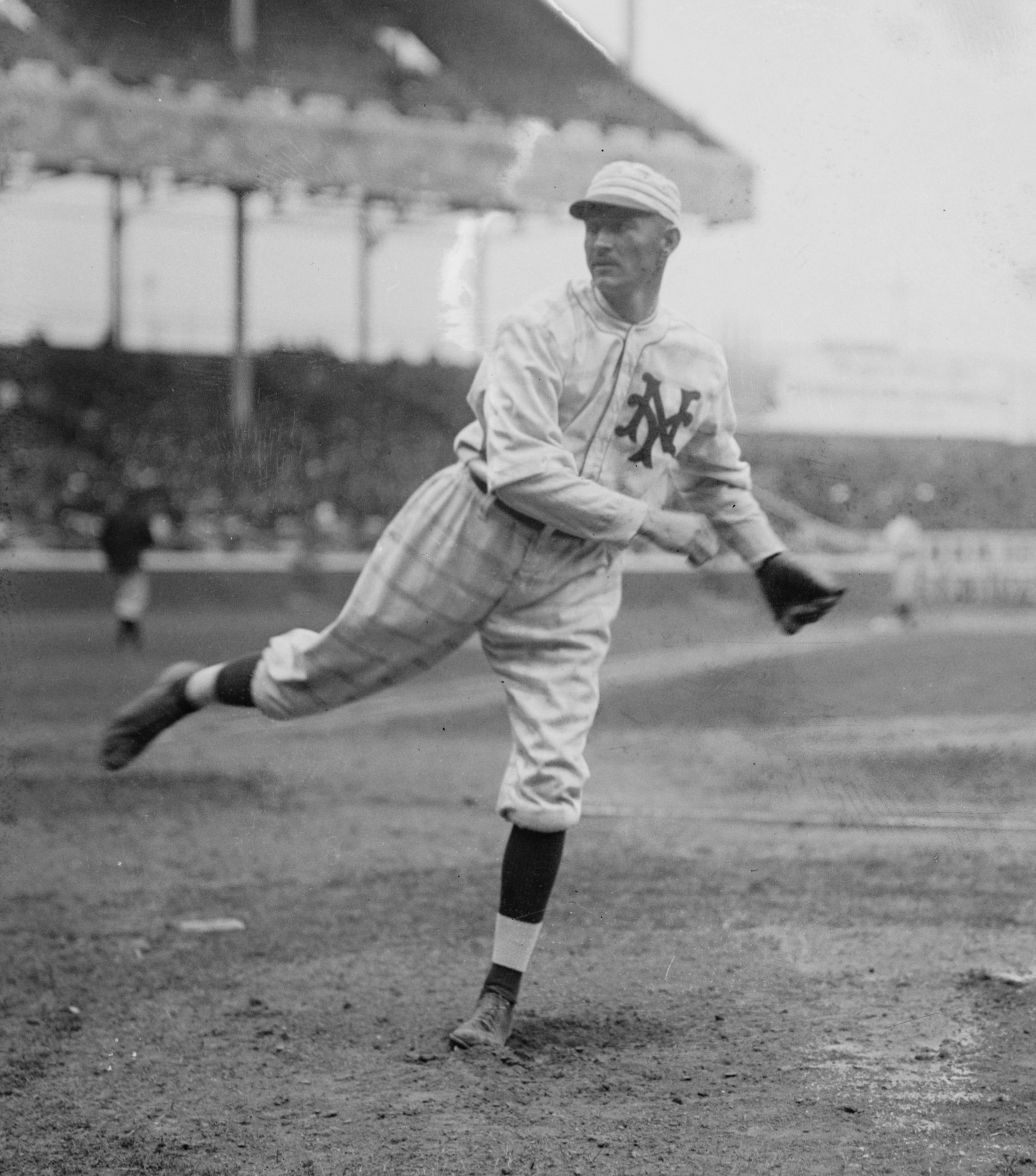
Stroud with New York in 1915.

Stroud returned to the major leagues in 1915, playing for the New York Giants. On May 5, 1915, he won a pitching duel with Grover Cleveland Alexander, holding the Phillies to two runs and handing Alexander his first loss of the season. In all, Stroud appeared in 22 games, nine as a starter, for the 1915 Giants, compiling a 12–9 record with a 2.79 ERA in 184 innings pitched. He remained with the Giants in 1916, compiling a 1–2 record with a 2.70 ERA in 10 games. Stroud won his last major league victory on May 26, 1916, a 12–1 win over the Boston Braves. He appeared in his final minor league game on June 13, 1916.

=== Minor leagues ===
After his major league career was over, Stroud continued to pitch in the minor leagues for another 13 years from 1916 to 1928. He played in the American Association for five years from 1916 to 1920 for the Louisville Colonels from 1916 to 1918. During the 1919 and 1920 seasons, he played for the Salt Lake City Bees of the Pacific Coast League (PCL), compiling a 26–13 record and 3.20 ERA in 1920.

In February 1921, Stroud signed with Hanford in the San Joaquin Valley League. Stroud remained with Hanford in 1922. At one point, the Hanford club reportedly sold Stroud to the New York Yankees, but Stroud refused to report as the wealthy agricultural interests were paying high salaries in the San Joaquin Valley League and a move to the Yankees would have required a pay cut.

In 1925, Stroud returned to the PCL and played in that circuit for another five years with the Salt Lake City Bees in 1925, Hollywood Stars and Los Angeles Angels in 1926, the Sacramento Senators in 1927, and the Portland Beavers in 1928. He also played in 1929 for the Oroville Olives in the Sacramento Valley League.

== Family and later year ==
Stroud was married in February 1910 to Catherine Dunlap of Allentown, Pennsylvania.

Stroud died in Stockton, California, in 1970 at age 84. He is buried at East Lawn Memorial Park in Sacramento, California.
