= Harry Suter =

American baseball player (1887–1971)

- Pitcher
- Born: September 15, 1887; Independence, Missouri, U.S.
- Died: July 24, 1971 (aged 83); Topeka, Kansas, U.S.
- Batted: Left Threw: Left

MLB debut
- April 16, 1909, for the Chicago White Sox

Last MLB appearance
- October 2, 1909, for the Chicago White Sox

MLB statistics
- Win–loss record: 2–3
- Earned run average: 2.47
- Strikeouts: 53
- Stats at Baseball Reference

Teams
- Chicago White Sox (1909)

Harry Richard "Rube" Suter (September 15, 1887 – July 24, 1971) was a professional baseball pitcher from 1906 to 1912. He played one season in Major League Baseball for the Chicago White Sox. Suter was 5 feet 10 inches (1.78 m) tall and weighed 190 pounds (86 kg).

== Career ==
Suter was born in Independence, Missouri, in 1887. He started his baseball career in 1906 with the South Texas League's Austin Senators and had a win–loss record of 15–9. The following season, he was 23–13. Suter then joined the San Francisco Seals of the Pacific Coast League and became one of the top pitchers in the circuit. In 1908, pitching a league-leading 415 innings, he went 27–20 with a 2.00 earned run average.

Suter's contract was purchased by the Chicago White Sox in August 1908. He was on the White Sox roster throughout 1909, and he made seven starts, relieved in 11 other games, and went 2–3 with a 2.47 ERA and an ERA+ of 96. His contract was then sold back to San Francisco after the season, and he never played in the majors again.

Returning to his old club in 1910, Suter picked up where he left off, going 16–14 with a 1.95 ERA. The following season, his ERA rose to 2.67, but he struck out 339 batters to set a Seals team record. He also threw a no-hitter on April 25 to beat Oakland, 1–0.

In 1912, Suter joined the Portland Beavers. He set a Pacific Coast League record on October 12, when he struck out 16 batters in a game against San Francisco. Suter pitched in 20 games that year and won only 5. His playing career ended after the season.

In 1938, Suter was the manager of the Western Association's Salina Millers. He died in Topeka, Kansas, in 1971.
