= Chris Mahoney (baseball) =

American baseball player (1885–1954)

- Pitcher
- Born: June 11, 1885; Milton, Massachusetts, U.S.
- Died: July 15, 1954 (aged 69); Visalia, California, U.S.
- Batted: Right Threw: Right

MLB debut
- July 12, 1910, for the Boston Red Sox

Last MLB appearance
- October 8, 1910, for the Boston Red Sox

MLB statistics
- Win–loss record: 0–1
- Strikeouts: 6
- Earned run average: 3.27
- Stats at Baseball Reference

Teams
- Boston Red Sox (1910)

Christopher John Mahoney (June 11, 1885 – July 15, 1954) was an American pitcher/center fielder in Major League Baseball who played briefly for the Boston Red Sox during the 1910 season. Listed at 5 ft 9 in (1.75 m), 160 lb., Mahoney batted and threw right-handed. A native of Milton, Massachusetts, he studied at Fordham University and Manhattan College.

In a three-game career, Mahoney was a .143 hitter (1-for-7) and scored a run. In two pitching appearances, he posted a 0–1 record with a 3.27 ERA, including one start, one game finished, one save, six strikeouts, five walks, 16 hits allowed, and 11.0 innings of work.

Mahoney died in Visalia, California, at age 69.
