= Marv Peasley =

American baseball player (1889–1948)

- Pitcher
- Born: July 16, 1889; Jonesport, Maine, U.S.
- Died: December 27, 1948 (aged 59); San Francisco, California, U.S.
- Batted: Left Threw: Left

MLB debut
- September 27, 1910, for the Detroit Tigers

Last MLB appearance
- October 6, 1910, for the Detroit Tigers

MLB statistics
- Win–loss record: 0–1
- Earned run average: 8.10
- Strikeouts: 4
- Stats at Baseball Reference

Teams
- Detroit Tigers (1910)

Marvin Warren Peasley (July 16, 1889 – December 27, 1948) was an American baseball left-handed pitcher.

Peasley was born in 1889 in Jonesport, Maine. He developed a reputation as a pitcher while playing for Ricker Institute in Houlton, Maine. He reportedly spent the spring of 1910 with Montreal's minor league club before forsaking professional baseball in order to finish his education. That summer, he pitched with "great success" for the Woodstock, New Brunswick team. Detroit Tigers scout Malachi Kittredge discovered him while he was pitching for the Woodstock club.

Peasley played Major League Baseball for the Detroit Tigers in September 1910, appearing in two games and compiling a 0–1 record with an earned run average of 8.10 in 10 innings pitched. There was some concern in 1911, that his career would end due to the increase of muscle mass to his arms from working with an axe during the previous winter, though would never again pitch in the majors.

In 1911, The Buffalo Times reported that he "may be one of the Buffalo club's pitchers this season" but he did not play professional baseball that year. In April 1912, he was reported to be "making a good impression ... with the Vancouver team" but only played in that season for the Winnipeg Maroons of the Central International League.

Peaseley died in 1948, at age 59 in San Francisco.
