= Red Kelly (baseball) =

American baseball player (1884–1961)

- Right fielder
- Born: November 15, 1884; Union, Illinois
- Died: February 4, 1961 (aged 76); Zephyrhills, Florida
- Batted: Right Threw: Right

MLB debut
- June 18, 1910, for the Chicago White Sox

Last MLB appearance
- August 6, 1910, for the Chicago White Sox

MLB statistics
- Batting average: .156
- Home runs: 0
- Runs batted in: 1
- Stats at Baseball Reference

Teams
- Chicago White Sox (1910)

Albert Michael "Red" Kelly (November 15, 1884 – February 4, 1961), was a Major League Baseball rightfielder who played in 1910 with the Chicago White Sox. He also played in the Minor Leagues with the Des Moines Boosters of the Western League in 1910 and 1912.
