= Dutch Lerchen =

American baseball player (1889–1962)

- Shortstop
- Born: April 4, 1889; Detroit, Michigan
- Died: January 7, 1962 (aged 72); Detroit, Michigan
- Batted: Right Threw: Right

MLB debut
- August 14, 1910, for the Boston Red Sox

Last MLB appearance
- October 8, 1910, for the Boston Red Sox

MLB statistics
- Games played: 6
- At bats: 15
- Hits: 0
- Stats at Baseball Reference

Teams
- Boston Red Sox (1910)

Bertram Roe "Dutch" Lerchen (April 4, 1889 – January 7, 1962) was a shortstop who played briefly for the Boston Red Sox during the 1910 season. Listed at 5 ft 8 in (1.73 m), 160 lb., Lerchen batted and threw right-handed. He was born in Detroit, Michigan. His son, George Lerchen, played for Detroit and Cincinnati from 1952 to 1953.

In a six-game career, Lerchen went hitless in 15 at-bats. He received a walk and scored a run. In six appearances at shortstop, he collected nine outs with four assists and made a double play while committing one error in 14 chances for a .929 fielding percentage.

He later became a food inspector with the Detroit Department of Health. Lerchen died in his hometown of Detroit, Michigan, at age 72.

== See also ==
- 1910 Boston Red Sox season
