= George Lerchen =

American baseball player (1922–2014)

- Outfielder
- Born: December 1, 1922; Detroit, Michigan, U.S.
- Died: March 26, 2014 (aged 91); Garden City, Michigan, U.S.
- Batted: Switch Threw: Right

MLB debut
- April 15, 1952, for the Detroit Tigers

Last MLB appearance
- September 13, 1953, for the Cincinnati Redlegs

MLB statistics
- Batting average: .204
- Home runs: 1
- Runs batted in: 5
- Stats at Baseball Reference

Teams
- Detroit Tigers (1952); Cincinnati Redlegs (1953)

George Edward Lerchen (December 1, 1922 – March 26, 2014) was an American backup outfielder in Major League Baseball who played from 1952 through 1953 for the Detroit Tigers (1952) and Cincinnati Redlegs (1953). Listed at 5' 11", 175 lb., Lerchen was a switch-hitter and threw right-handed. He was born in Detroit, Michigan. His father, Dutch Lerchen, played briefly for the 1910 Boston Red Sox.

In a two-season career Lerchen was a .204 hitter (10-for-49) with one home run and five RBI in 36 games, including three runs, 10 doubles, one stolen base, and a .361 on-base percentage. In eight outfield appearances at center field (4) and right, he posted a perfect 1.000 fielding percentage in 16 chances.
