= Ed Hearne =

American baseball player (1887–1952)

- Shortstop
- Born: September 17, 1887; Ventura, California
- Died: September 8, 1952 (aged 64); Sawtelle, California
- Batted: Right Threw: Right

MLB debut
- June 9, 1910, for the Boston Red Sox

Last MLB appearance
- June 10, 1910, for the Boston Red Sox

MLB statistics
- Batting average: .000
- Home runs: 0
- Runs batted in: 0
- Stats at Baseball Reference

Teams
- Boston Red Sox (1910)

Edmund Hearne (September 17, 1887 – September 8, 1952) was a shortstop in Major League Baseball. Hearn batted and threw right-handed. He was born in Ventura, California.

A World War I veteran, Hearne played briefly for the Boston Red Sox from June 9–10 of 1910. He was hitless in two at-bats appearances. Following his playing career, he worked as a guard at the Veterans Affairs Complex in Los Angeles.

Hearne died in Sawtelle, California, at the age of 64.

== Sources ==
- Career statistics from Baseball Reference · Baseball Reference (Minors) · Retrosheet
