= Matty McIntyre =

American baseball player (1880–1920)

- McIntyre in 1905
- Outfielder
- Born: June 12, 1880; Stonington, Connecticut, U.S.
- Died: April 2, 1920 (aged 39); Detroit, Michigan, U.S.
- Batted: Left Threw: Left

MLB debut
- July 3, 1901, for the Philadelphia Athletics

Last MLB appearance
- August 21, 1912, for the Chicago White Sox

MLB statistics
- Batting average: .269
- Home runs: 4
- Runs batted in: 319
- Stats at Baseball Reference

Teams
- Philadelphia Athletics (1901); Detroit Tigers (1904–1910); Chicago White Sox (1911–1912)

Matthew Martin McIntyre (June 12, 1880 – April 2, 1920) was an American baseball outfielder and manager. He played professionally from 1901 to 1917, including ten seasons in Major League Baseball with the Philadelphia Athletics (1901), Detroit Tigers (1904–1910), and Chicago White Sox (1911–1912). He was also a player-manager for the Lincoln Tigers (1915) and the Mobile Sea Gulls (1916–1917).

The leadoff hitter on the Detroit Tigers teams that won three consecutive American League pennants from 1907 to 1909, he led the league in 1908 with 105 runs, 131 singles, and 258 times on base, and ranked among the league leaders with a .295 batting average (fifth), .392 on-base percentage (second), and .383 slugging percentage (fifth). He was also known for his defensive skill, leading the league's left fielders in fielding percentage (1905-06, 1908-09), assists and double plays turned (1905, 1906, and 1908).

== Early years ==
McIntyre was born in Stonington, Connecticut, in 1880. He was one of seven sons born to Irish immigrants. The family moved to Staten Island, New York, where McIntyre grew up.

== Professional baseball ==
=== Augusta and Philadelphia ===
McIntyre began his professional baseball career with the New England League club in Augusta, Maine. He appeared in 23 games in May and June 1901, compiling a .292 batting average. In addition to his batting, McIntrye won praise for his play in left field, one Maine newspaper in June 1901 describing how he robbed a batter of a likely triple: "But the fleet footed McIntyre was after it at a 10 second gait. He was nearly there. He can't reach it: yes, he has it. It was a phenomenal catch, the ball striking in McIntyre's right hand about a foot from the ground. A beautiful one hand catch." The writer called McIntyre "a sure, hard working player, a perfectly modest young man who tries for everything that comes his way."

In June 1901, McIntyre was signed by the Philadelphia Athletics of the newly-formed American League. He made his major-league debut on July 3, 1901; he was the seventh-youngest player in the league at the time. He appeared in 82 games as the Athletics' starting left fielder in 1901 and ranked fifth in range factor among the league's left fielders. McIntyre was given his release by Connie Mack and the Athletics after the 1901 season.

=== Newark and Buffalo ===
McIntyre signed with the Newark Sailors in 1902. As of August 9, McIntyre had appeared in 85 games for Newark, compiling a .261 batting average.

At the end of August 1902, McIntyre was sold by Newark to the Buffalo Bisons for a purchase price reported to be $1,000. He finished the 1902 season with Buffalo and in 1903 had a breakout season with Bisons. By mid-May 1903, he was leading the Eastern League with a .417 batting average. He appeared in 121 games and compiled a .342 batting average and .465 slugging percentage with 11 triples and 90 RBIs.

=== Detroit Tigers ===
==== 1904 and 1905 ====
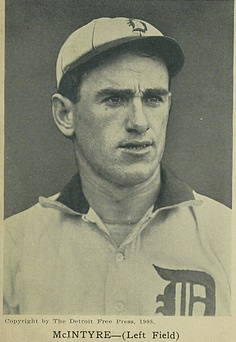
McIntyre in 1908

In October 1903, McIntyre was traded by Buffalo to Detroit along with Cy Ferry in exchange for several players including Rube Kisinger and Sport McAllister. In 1904, McIntyre joined Sam Crawford and Jimmy Barrett in the Detroit outfield and appeared in 152 games, starting 150 games in left field and one in center field. He led the American League with 331 putouts in left field and a 2.30 range factor/game at the position. He also ranked fourth with 14 errors at the position. McIntyre also ranked third in the league with 28 sacrifice hits.

In 1905, McIntyre returned as Detroit's starter in left field, appearing in 129 games at the position and two in center field. He compiled a .263 batting average and a .330 on base percentage. He led the American League's left fielders in both putouts (283), assists (18), fielding percentage (.968), and range factor per game (2.33).

==== Feud with Cobb ====
Ty Cobb, at age 18, joined McIntyre in the Tigers' outfield in August 1905. McIntyre was the leader of the "anti-Cobb" clique on the Tigers during Cobb's early years. Early in Cobb's rookie season, Cobb went after a fly ball that was in McIntyre's left field territory. By cutting in front, Cobb caused McIntyre to drop the ball, infuriating McIntyre. McIntyre also had little in common with the taciturn young Cobb from Georgia. McIntyre and his cohorts led a prolonged hazing campaign, locking Cobb out of an empty washroom, flicking food at Cobb, and nailing his shoes to the clubhouse floor. Cobb's legendary temper only added fuel to the fire, and the McIntyre-Cobb feud continued throughout their six years playing beside each other in Detroit.

==== 1906 and 1907 ====
McIntyre had another strong season in 1906. He started 133 games in left field and again led the league's left fielders in fielding percentage (.982). At the plate, he compiled a .260 batting average (.338 on-base percentage) and tallied a career-high 29 stolen bases.

McIntyre's 1907 began with McIntyre playing the best baseball of his career. On May 9, 1907, his right shoe caught the bag as he attempted a feet-first slide into first base. A bone in his right ankle snapped, and he had to be carried from the field to the clubhouse, where he fainted from the pain. McIntyre was unable to return to the team in 1907.

==== 1908 to 1910 seasons ====
McIntyre returned from the injury with the best season of his career in 1908. He helped lead the Tigers to the World Series and was the second-best hitter in the American League (behind teammate Ty Cobb). In 1908, McIntyre was first in the American League in several categories: plate appearances (672), times on base (258), runs (105), and singles (131). In 1908, he was also among the leaders in almost every other offensive category: No. 2 in on-base percentage (.392), fifth in batting average (.295), fifth in slugging percentage (.385), fourth in OPS (.775), third in hits (168), fourth in total bases (218), ninth in doubles (24), fifth in triples (13), third in bases on balls (83), third in runs created, and seventh in extra base hits (37).

In 1,072 career games, McIntyre batted .269 with 562 runs, 1,066 hits, 140 doubles, 69 triples, 4 home runs, 319 runs batted in, 120 stolen bases, 439 walks, 1,356 total bases, and 87 sacrifice hits.

=== Chicago White Sox ===
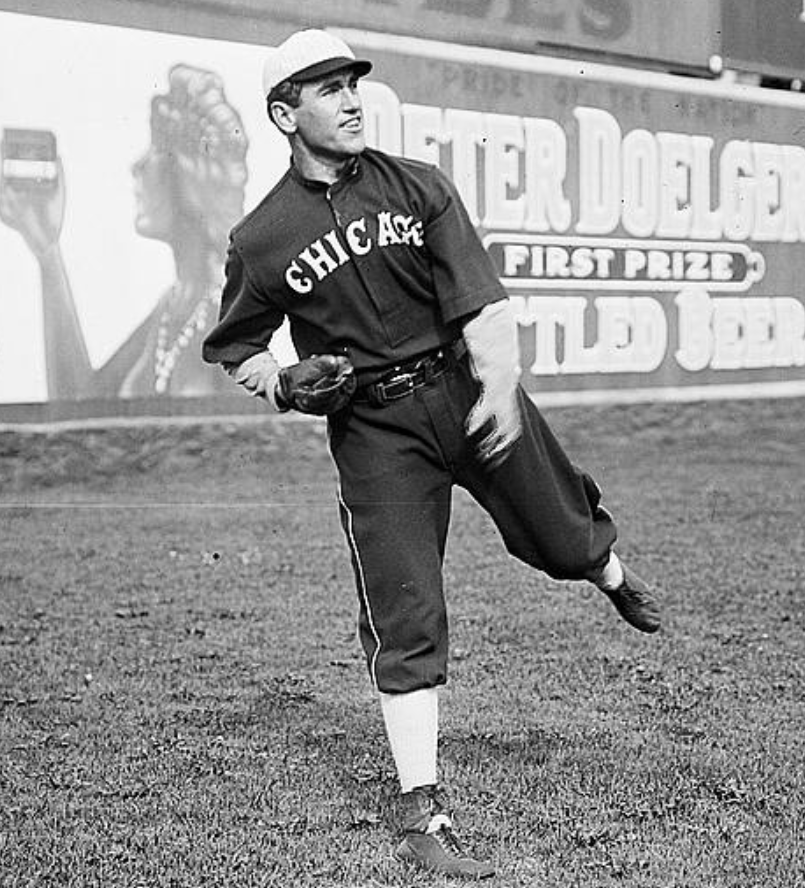
McIntyre with White Sox (1912)

In January 1911, McIntyre was sold by the Tigers to the Chicago White Sox for approximately $2,500. He appeared in 146 games for the White Sox in 1911, including 112 games in right field and 31 games in center field. He also had a strong season at the plate, compiling a .323 batting average and .397 on-base percentage. He ranked fifth in the league with 153 singles, sixth with 184 hits and 64 bases on balls, and eighth with 102 runs scored.

After a strong 1911 season, McIntyre performance declined precipitously in 1912. In 49 games for the White Sox (14 in left field, 10 in right field, and one in center field), he compiled a .167 batting average, more than 150 points lower than his 1911 average. He appeared in his last major-league game on August 24, 1912.

=== San Francisco and Providence ===
The White Sox traded McIntyre to Milwaukee in late August 1912, but Milwaukee sent him back. He was then sold by the White Sox in early September to the San Francisco Seals of the Pacific Coast League (PCL). He appeared in 41 games for San Francisco, compiling a .382 batting average and .a 559 slugging percentage. His .382 batting average led the PCL for the 1912 season. Despite his success in San Francisco, McIntyre declined a contract offer to return to the club in 1913.

In March 1913, McIntyre signed with the Providence Grays of the International League. The Providence team was owned by Detroit owner Frank Navin and managed by McIntyre's former Detroit teammate Bill Donovan. McIntyre's career was revived in Providence. He appeared in 151 games in 1913, compiling a .285 batting average and .364 on-base percentage. He continued with Providence in 1914, compiling a .310 batting average and .394 on-base percentage. The 1914 Grays won the International League championship with a 95–59 record. McIntyre's teammates on the 1914 team included Babe Ruth in his first year of professional baseball.

=== Lincoln and Mobile ===
In November 1914, McIntyre was hired as the player-manager of the Lincoln Tigers of the Western League. He was recommended for the position by Frank Navin, president of the Detroit Tigers.

McIntyre was hired in August 1916 as a player-manager for the Mobile Sea Gulls of the Southern Association. McIntyre was unable to revive the Gulls who were in last place when he took over as manager. The team opened the 1917 season with only eight wins in 28 games played. In mid-May 1917, the club forfeited its Southern league franchise and cut McIntrye's pay by half. McIntyre refused to accept the pay cut, severed his connection with the club, and returned to his home in Detroit.

=== Photo gallery ===
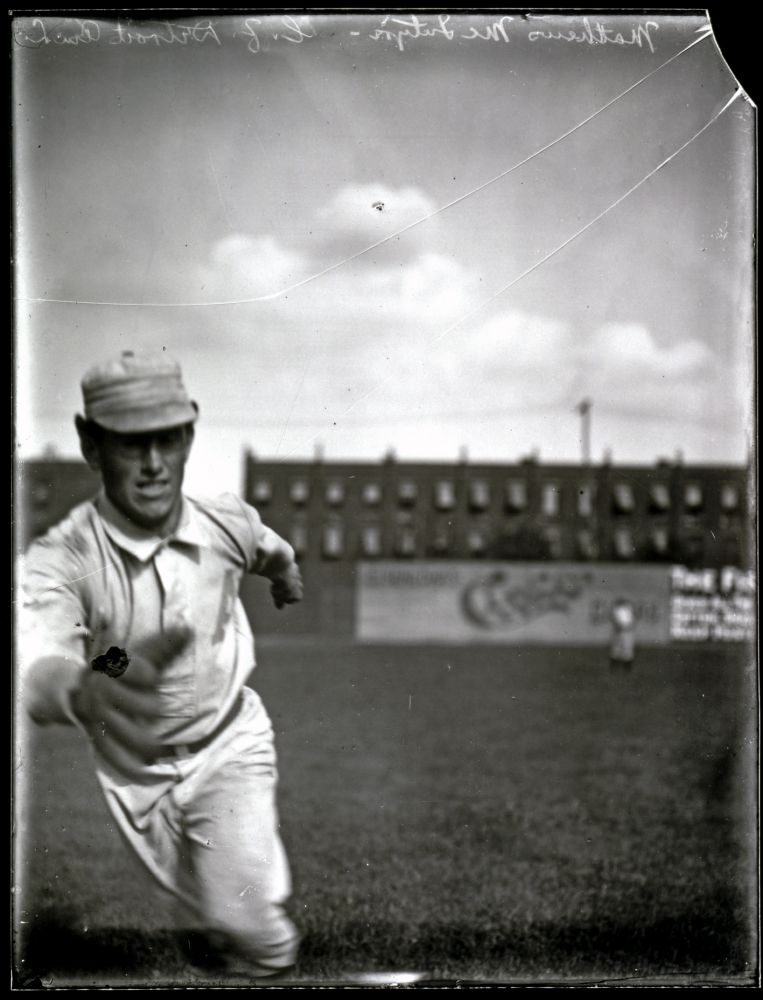
1904 action photo

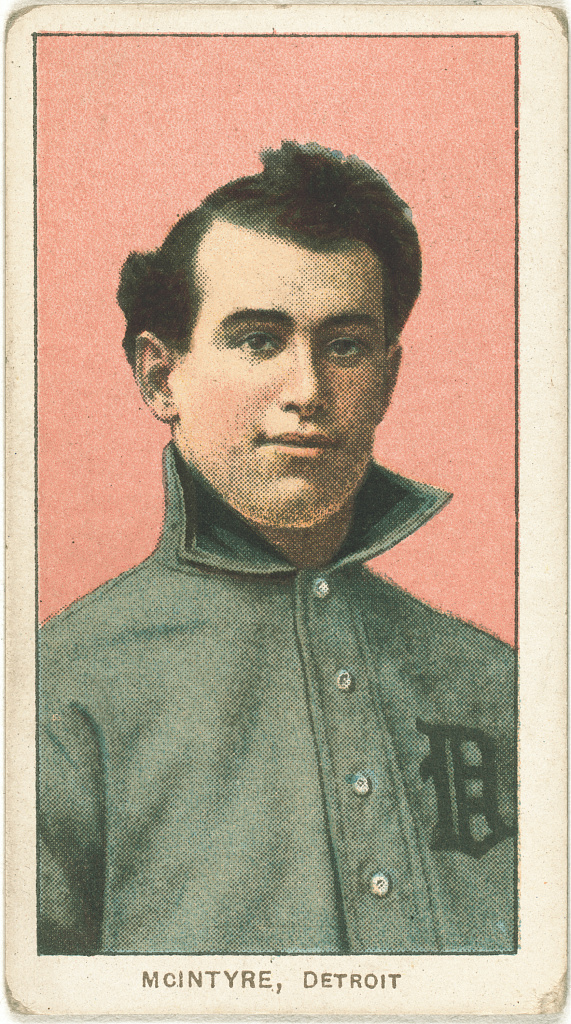
American Tobacco 1909

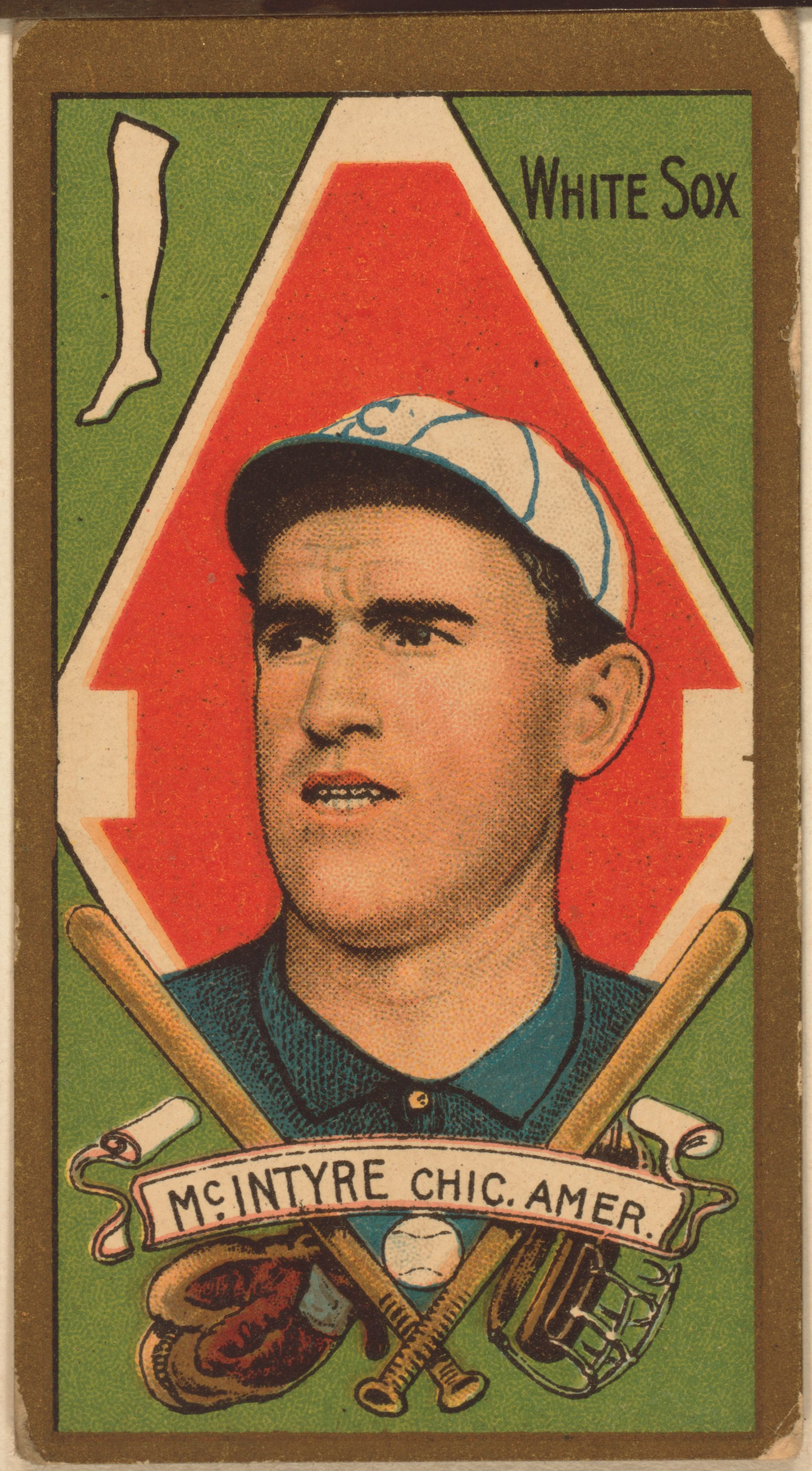
American Tobacco 1911

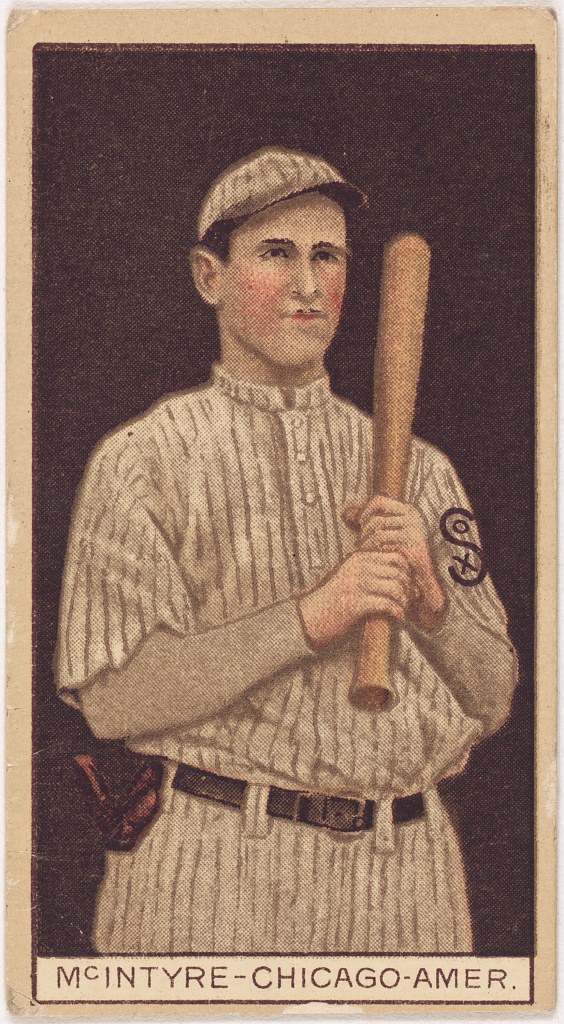
American Tobacco 1912

== Later years ==
After his professional baseball career ended, McIntyre continued to play semi-pro baseball with clubs in Detroit. He also operated a pool hall and was also a member of the Elks and Knights of Columbus. McIntyre died in April 1920 at St. Mary's Hospital in Detroit following a week's illness with influenza and an attack of Bright's disease. He was 39 years old at the time of his death.

== See also ==
- List of Major League Baseball annual runs scored leaders
