= Fred Olmstead =

American baseball player (1881–1936)

- Pitcher
- Born: July 3, 1881; Grand Rapids, Michigan, U.S.
- Died: October 22, 1936 (aged 55); Muskogee, Oklahoma, U.S.
- Batted: Right Threw: Right

MLB debut
- July 2, 1908, for the Chicago White Sox

Last MLB appearance
- September 4, 1911, for the Chicago White Sox

MLB statistics
- Win–loss record: 19-20
- Earned run average: 2.74
- Strikeouts: 135
- Stats at Baseball Reference

Teams
- Chicago White Sox (1908–1911)

Frederic William Olmstead (July 3, 1881 – October 22, 1936) was an American pitcher in Major League Baseball. He played for the Chicago White Sox from 1908 to 1911.
