= Willis Cole =

American baseball player (1882–1965)

- Outfielder
- Born: January 6, 1882; Milton, Wisconsin, U.S.
- Died: October 11, 1965 (aged 83); Madison, Wisconsin, U.S.
- Batted: Right Threw: Right

MLB debut
- August 22, 1909, for the Chicago White Sox

Last MLB appearance
- June 13, 1910, for the Chicago White Sox

MLB statistics
- Batting average: .216
- Home runs: 0
- Runs batted in: 18
- Stats at Baseball Reference

Teams
- Chicago White Sox (1909–1910)

Willis Russell Cole (January 6, 1882 – October 11, 1965) was an American outfielder in Major League Baseball who played parts of two seasons for the Chicago White Sox.
