= Major League Baseball Most Valuable Player Award =

American professional baseball award

Major League Baseball Most Valuable Player Award (MVP)
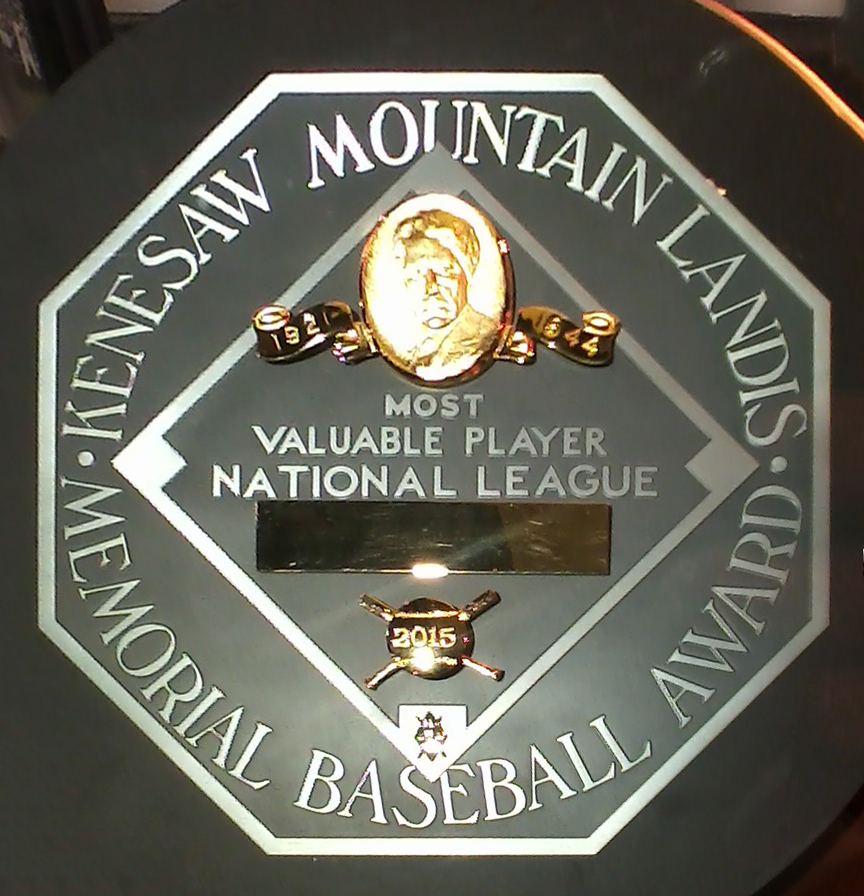
- The 2015 National League Most Valuable Player Award
- Sport: Baseball
- League: Major League Baseball
- Awarded for: Regular season most valuable player of American League and National League
- Country: United States, Canada
- Presented by: Baseball Writers' Association of America

History
- First award: 1931
- Most wins: Barry Bonds (7)
- Most recent: Pete Crow-Armstrong (NL); Yordan Alvarez (AL)

The Major League Baseball Most Valuable Player Award (MVP) is an annual Major League Baseball (MLB) award given to one outstanding player in the American League (AL) and one in the National League (NL). The award has been presented by the Baseball Writers' Association of America (BBWAA) since 1931.

== History ==
Since 1931, the Baseball Writers' Association of America (BBWAA) has bestowed a most valuable player award to a player in the National League and a player in the American League. Before 1931, two similar awards were issued: the League Award was issued during 1922–1928 in the American League and during 1924–1929 in the National League. During 1911–1914, the Chalmers Award was issued to a player in each league. Criteria and a list of winners for these two earlier awards are detailed in below sections.

MVP voting takes place before the postseason, but the results are not announced until after the World Series. The BBWAA began by polling three writers in each league city in 1938, reducing that number to two per league city in 1961. The BBWAA does not offer a clear-cut definition of what "most valuable" means, instead leaving the judgment to the individual voters.

In 1944, the award was named after Kenesaw Mountain Landis, the first Commissioner of Baseball, who served from 1920 until his death on November 25, 1944. Formally named the Kenesaw Mountain Landis Memorial Baseball Award, that naming appeared on a plaque given to winning players. Starting in 2020, Landis' name no longer appears on the MVP plaque, after the BBWAA received complaints from several former MVP winners about Landis' role against the integration of MLB.

First basemen, with 35 winners, have won the most MVPs among infielders, followed by second basemen (16), third basemen (15), and shortstops (15). Of the 25 pitchers who have won the award, 15 are right-handed while 10 are left-handed. Walter Johnson, Carl Hubbell, and Hal Newhouser are the only pitchers who have won multiple times, with Newhouser winning consecutively in 1944 and 1945.

Hank Greenberg, Stan Musial, Alex Rodriguez, Robin Yount, and Shohei Ohtani have won at different positions, while Rodriguez is the only player who has won the award with two different teams at two different positions, and Ohtani the only one to do it at two positions in the same season (twice). Rodriguez and Andre Dawson are the only players to win the award while on a last-place team, the 2003 Texas Rangers and 1987 Chicago Cubs, respectively. Barry Bonds has won the most often (seven times) and the most consecutively (four from 2001 to 2004). Jimmie Foxx was the first player to win multiple times. Ten players have won three times, and 19 have won twice. Frank Robinson and Shohei Ohtani are the only players to win the award in both the American and National Leagues, with Ohtani being the first to win in both leagues in consecutive as well as multiple seasons.

The award's only tie occurred in the National League in 1979, when Keith Hernandez and Willie Stargell received an equal number of points. There have been 23 unanimous winners, who received all the first-place votes. The New York Yankees have the most winning players with 24, followed by the St. Louis Cardinals with 21 winners. The award has never been presented to a member of the following three teams: Arizona Diamondbacks, New York Mets, and Tampa Bay Rays.

In recent decades, pitchers have rarely won the award. When Ohtani won the AL award in 2021, he became the first pitcher in either league to be named the MVP since Clayton Kershaw in 2014, and the first in the American League since Justin Verlander in 2011. Ohtani also became the first two-way player to win the award and in 2023, he became the first player in MLB history to win MVP by unanimous vote twice. Since the creation of the Cy Young Award in 1956, he is the only pitcher to win an MVP award without winning a Cy Young in the same year (Don Newcombe, Sandy Koufax, Bob Gibson, Denny McLain, Vida Blue, Rollie Fingers, Willie Hernández, Roger Clemens, Dennis Eckersley, Verlander, and Kershaw all won a Cy Young award in their MVP seasons). In 2024, Ohtani became the first MVP winner to have played exclusively as a designated hitter in a season, a position that normally does not contribute on defense.

There was no award given by either league in 1930, which meant that one of the single greatest performances ever went unheralded when Hack Wilson of the Chicago Cubs set the current MLB record for RBI with 191. He also batted .356 and set the NL record with 56 HRs, a record which stood for 68 years until Mark McGwire (70) and Sammy Sosa (66) both eclipsed him.

== Key ==
Year	Links to the article about the corresponding Major League Baseball season
†	Member of the National Baseball Hall of Fame as a player
^	Player is still active^{[a]}
§	Unanimous selection^{[b]}
Player (X)	Denotes winning player and number of times they had won the award at that point
*	Team won the league pennant
P	Pitcher (RHP indicates right-handed; LHP indicates left-handed)
C	Catcher
1B	First baseman
2B	Second baseman
3B	Third baseman
SS	Shortstop
OF	Outfielder
DH	Designated hitter

== Chalmers Award (1911–1914) ==
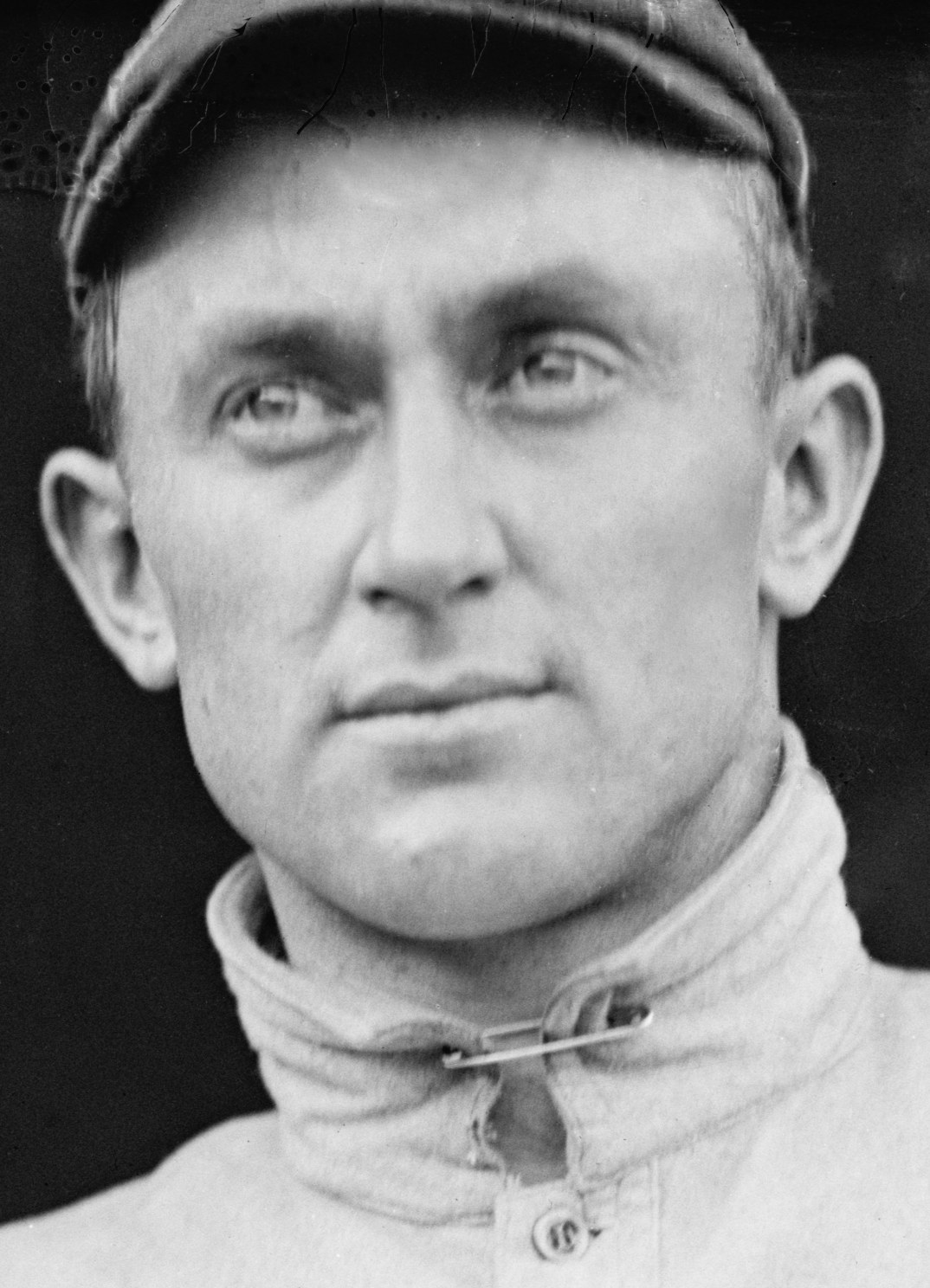
Ty Cobb won the first American League Chalmers Award in 1911 and was at the center of the controversy over the previous season's award.

Before the 1910 season, Hugh Chalmers of Chalmers Automobile announced he would present a Chalmers Model 30 automobile to the player with the highest batting average in Major League Baseball at the end of the season. The 1910 race for best average in the American League was between the Detroit Tigers' widely disliked Ty Cobb and Nap Lajoie of the Cleveland Indians. On the last day of the season, Lajoie overtook Cobb's batting average with seven bunt hits against the St. Louis Browns. American League President Ban Johnson said a recalculation showed that Cobb had won the race anyway, and Chalmers ended up awarding cars to both players.

In the following season, Chalmers created the Chalmers Award. A committee of baseball writers was to convene after the season to determine the "most important and useful player to the club and the league." Since the award was not as effective at advertising as Chalmers had hoped, it was discontinued after 1914.

Year	American League winner	Team	Position	National League winner	Team	Position	Ref
1911	Ty Cobb^{†}^{§}	Detroit Tigers	OF	Frank Schulte	Chicago Cubs	OF	
1912	Tris Speaker^{†}	Boston Red Sox	OF	Larry Doyle	New York Giants*	2B	
1913	Walter Johnson^{†}	Washington Senators	RHP	Jake Daubert	Brooklyn Superbas	1B	
1914	Eddie Collins^{†}	Philadelphia Athletics*	2B	Johnny Evers^{†}	Boston Braves*	2B	

== League Awards (1922–1929) ==
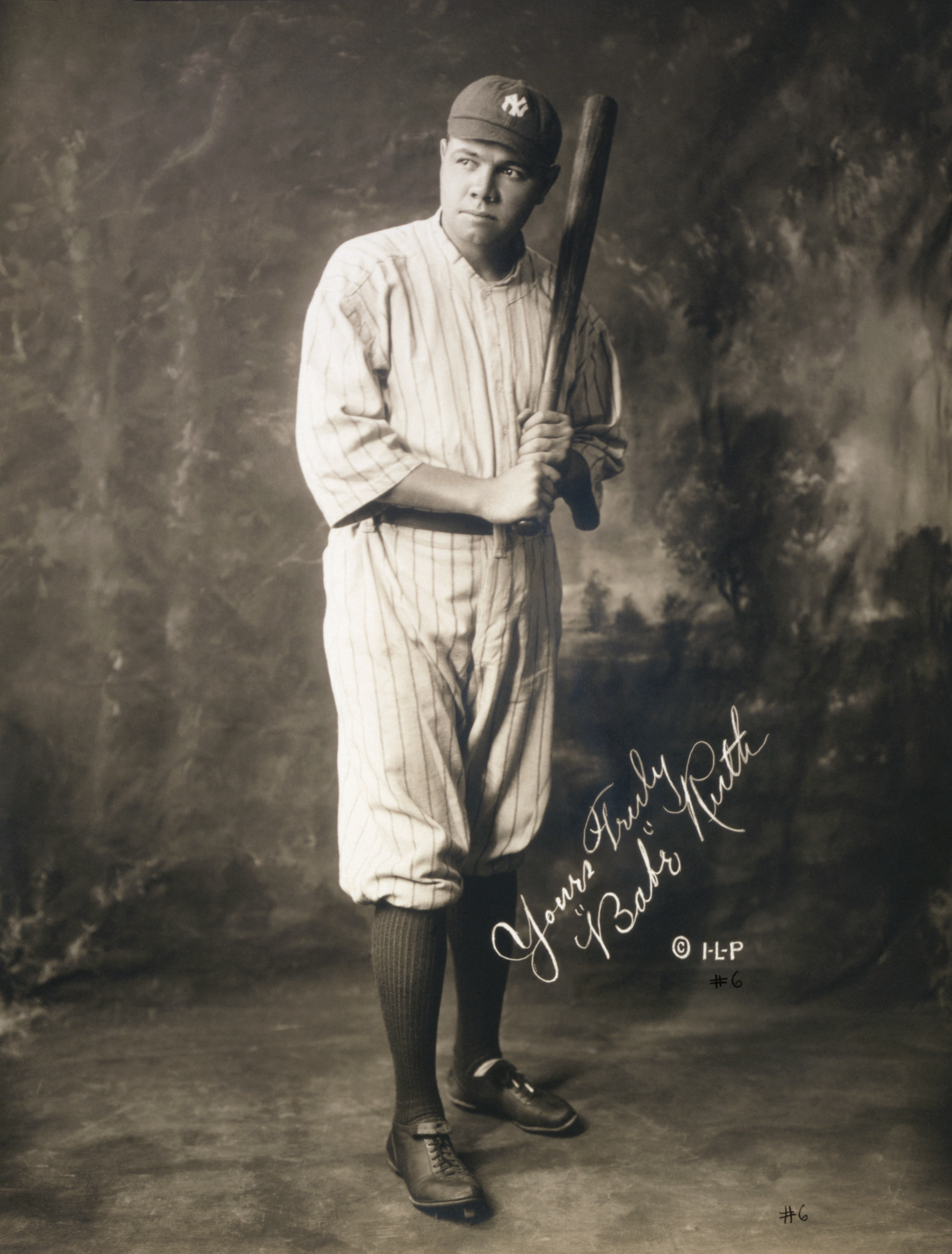
Babe Ruth was ineligible for the award in his famous 1927 season by the rules of the American League award because he had previously won in 1923.

In 1922, the American League created a new award to honor "the baseball player who is of the greatest all-around service to his club." Winners, voted on by a committee of eight baseball writers chaired by James Crusinberry, received a bronze medal and a cash prize. Voters were required to select one player from each team, and player-coaches and prior award winners were ineligible. Famously, these criteria resulted in Babe Ruth winning only a single MVP award before it was dropped after 1928. The National League award, without these restrictions, lasted from 1924 to 1929. In 1929, The Sporting News began awarding The Sporting News Most Valuable Player Award, albeit with the first year being for the American League only. The voting system from before also did their own balloting on an unofficial level. Lew Fonseca was voted unofficial AL MVP while Al Simmons won The Sporting News MVP. The 1930 season saw unofficial votes for both leagues alongside the Sporting News doing their own awards. Joe Cronin and Bill Terry were voted the Sporting News MVP while Cronin and Hack Wilson won the unofficial BBWAA vote. The Hall of Fame plaques for both Cronin and Terry mention them as the Most Valuable Player in 1930.

Year	American League winner	Team	Position	National League winner	Team	Position	Ref
1922	George Sisler^{†}	St. Louis Browns	1B	—	—	—	
1923	Babe Ruth^{†}^{§}	New York Yankees*	OF	—	—	—	
1924	Walter Johnson^{†} (2)	Washington Senators*	RHP	Dazzy Vance^{†}	Brooklyn Robins	RHP	
1925	Roger Peckinpaugh	Washington Senators*	SS	Rogers Hornsby^{†}	St. Louis Cardinals	2B	
1926	George Burns	Cleveland Indians	1B	Bob O'Farrell	St. Louis Cardinals*	C	
1927	Lou Gehrig^{†}	New York Yankees*	1B	Paul Waner^{†}	Pittsburgh Pirates*	OF	
1928	Mickey Cochrane^{†}	Philadelphia Athletics	C	Jim Bottomley^{†}	St. Louis Cardinals*	1B	
1929	—	—	—	Rogers Hornsby^{†} (2)	Chicago Cubs*	2B	

== BBWAA Most Valuable Player (1931–present) ==
The Baseball Writers' Association of America (BBWAA) was first awarded the modern MVP after the 1931 season, adopting the format the National League used to distribute its league award. One writer in each city with a team filled out a ten-place ballot, with ten points for the recipient of a first-place vote, nine for a second-place vote, and so on. In 1938, the BBWAA raised the number of voters to three per city and gave 14 points for a first-place vote. The only significant change since then occurred in 1961 when the number of voters was reduced to two per league city.

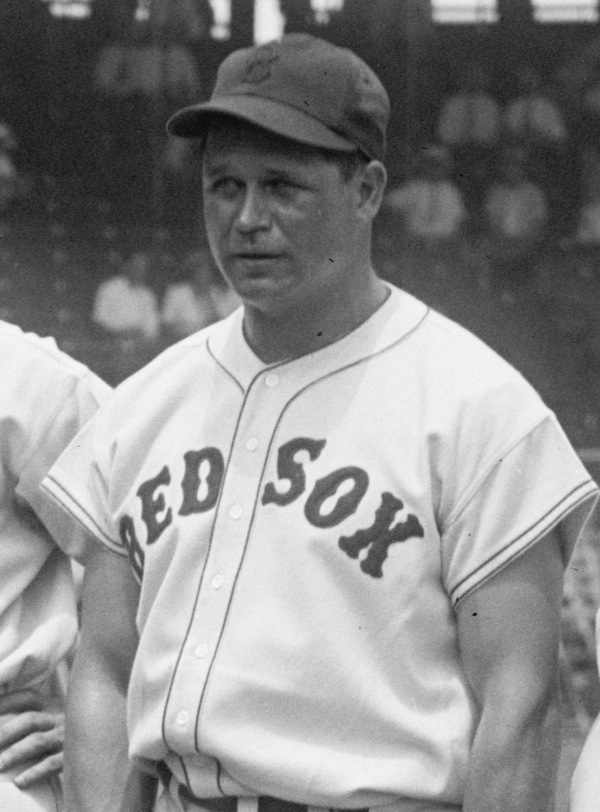
Hall of Famer Jimmie Foxx was the first player to win three MVP awards.

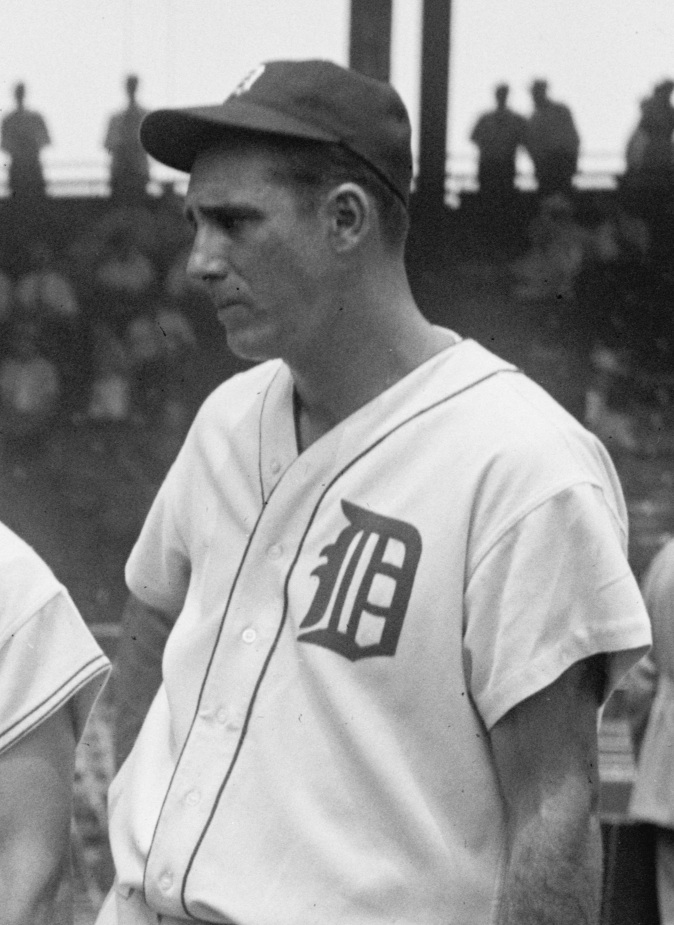
Hall of Famer and two-time MVP Hank Greenberg was the first player to win the award at two different fielding positions (1B and OF).

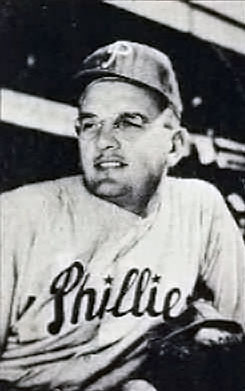
Jim Konstanty, to date the only National League relief pitcher to be named MVP, won it in 1950.

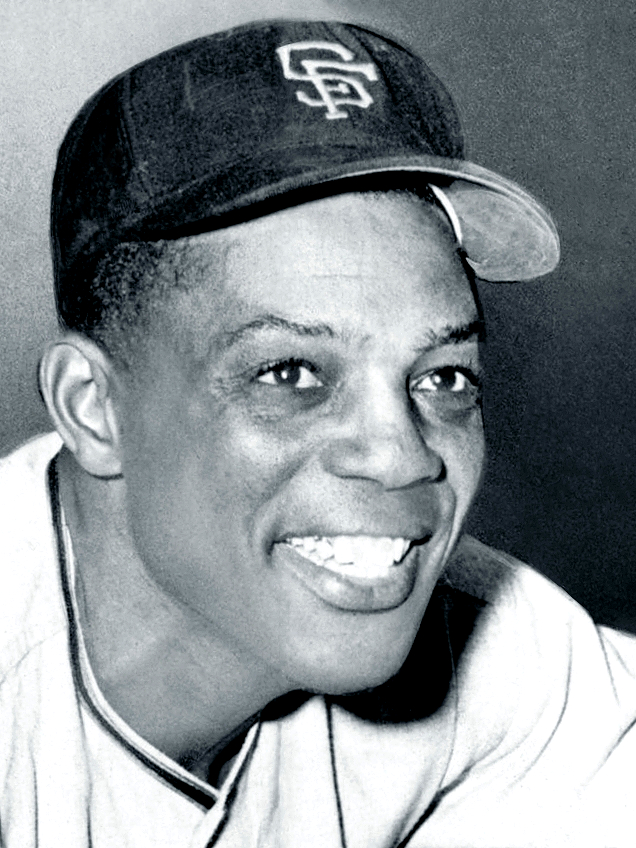
Hall of Famer Willie Mays won the award in 1954 and 1965 with the same team in different cities.

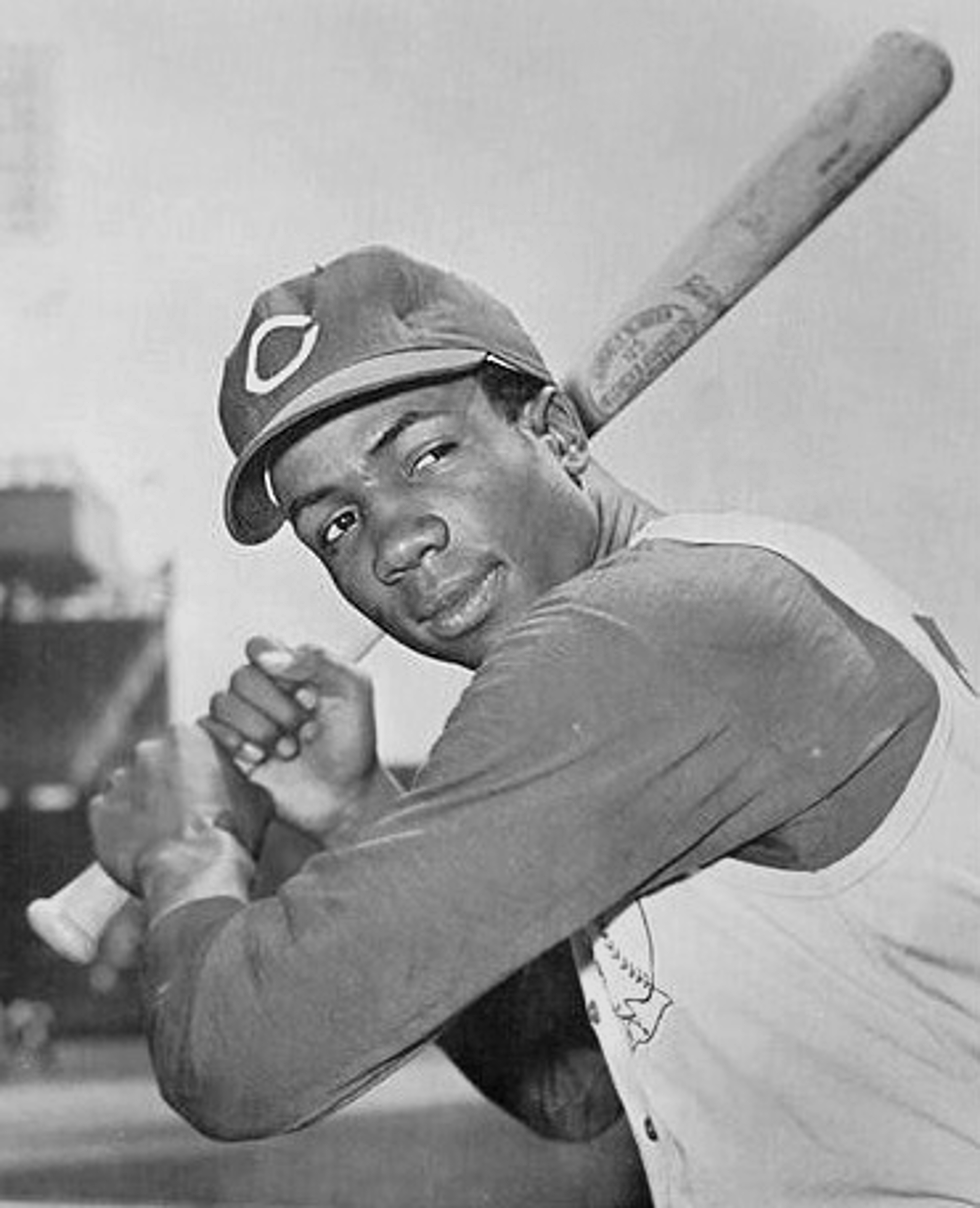
Hall of Famer Frank Robinson is the first player to win the award in both leagues (NL in 1961 and AL in 1966).

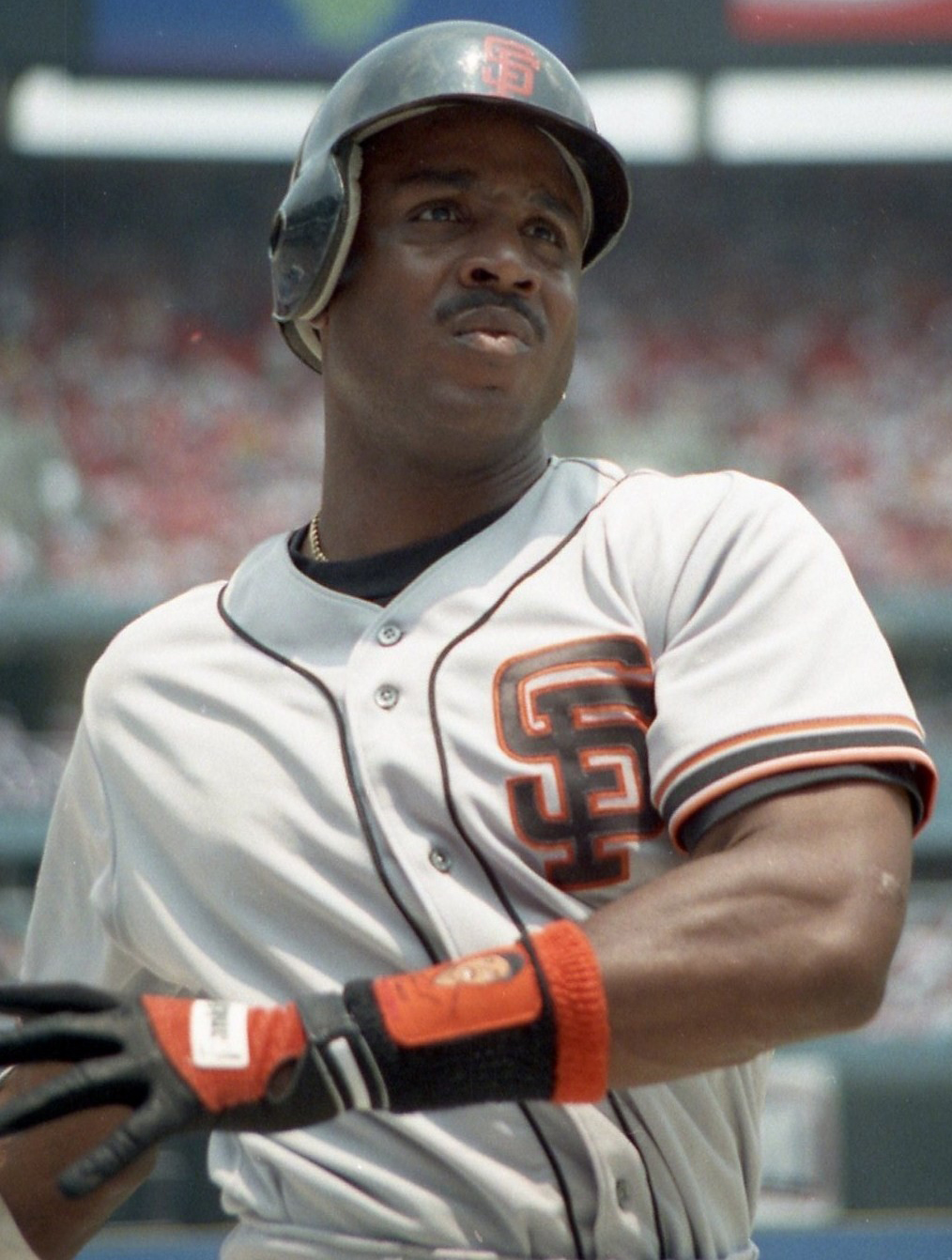
Barry Bonds' seven MVPs are the most for any individual player.

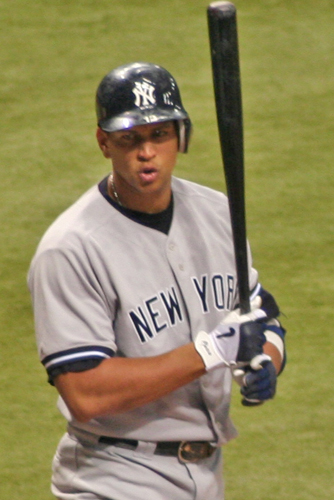
Alex Rodriguez won the award with two different teams at two different positions.

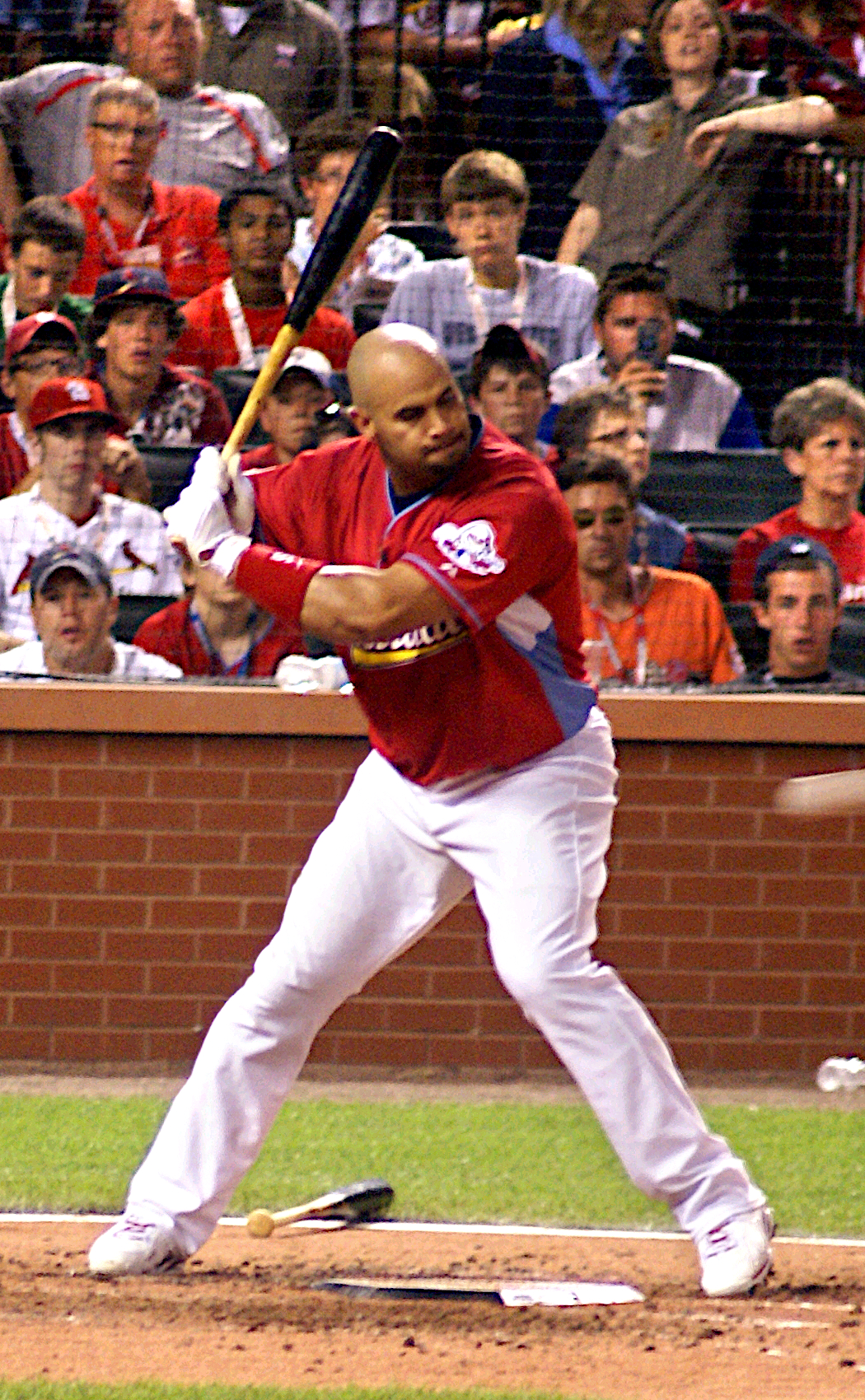
Albert Pujols won the award three times, at first base with the St. Louis Cardinals.

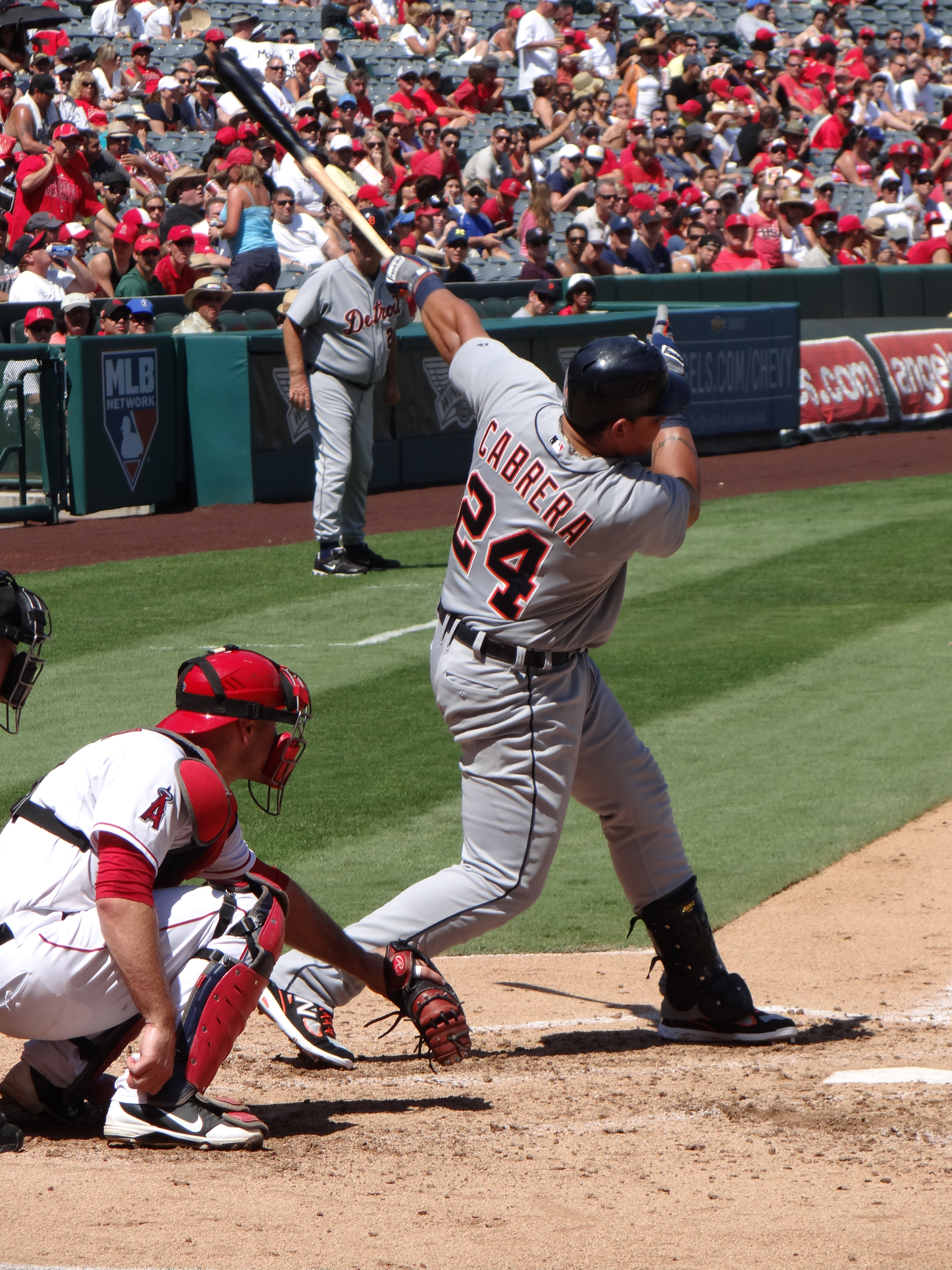
Miguel Cabrera was the winner of back-to-back AL Awards from 2012 to 2013.

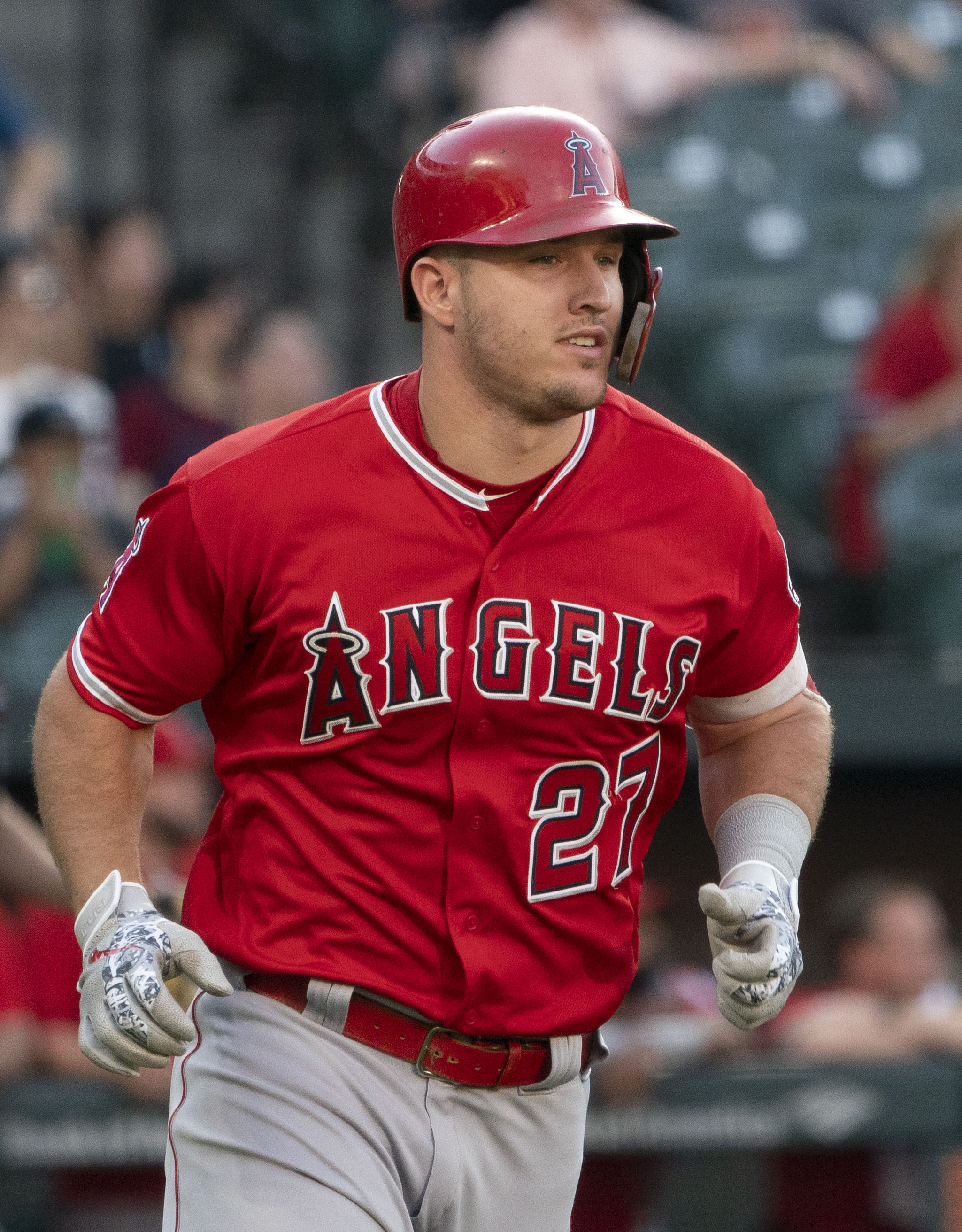
Mike Trout won the award three times.

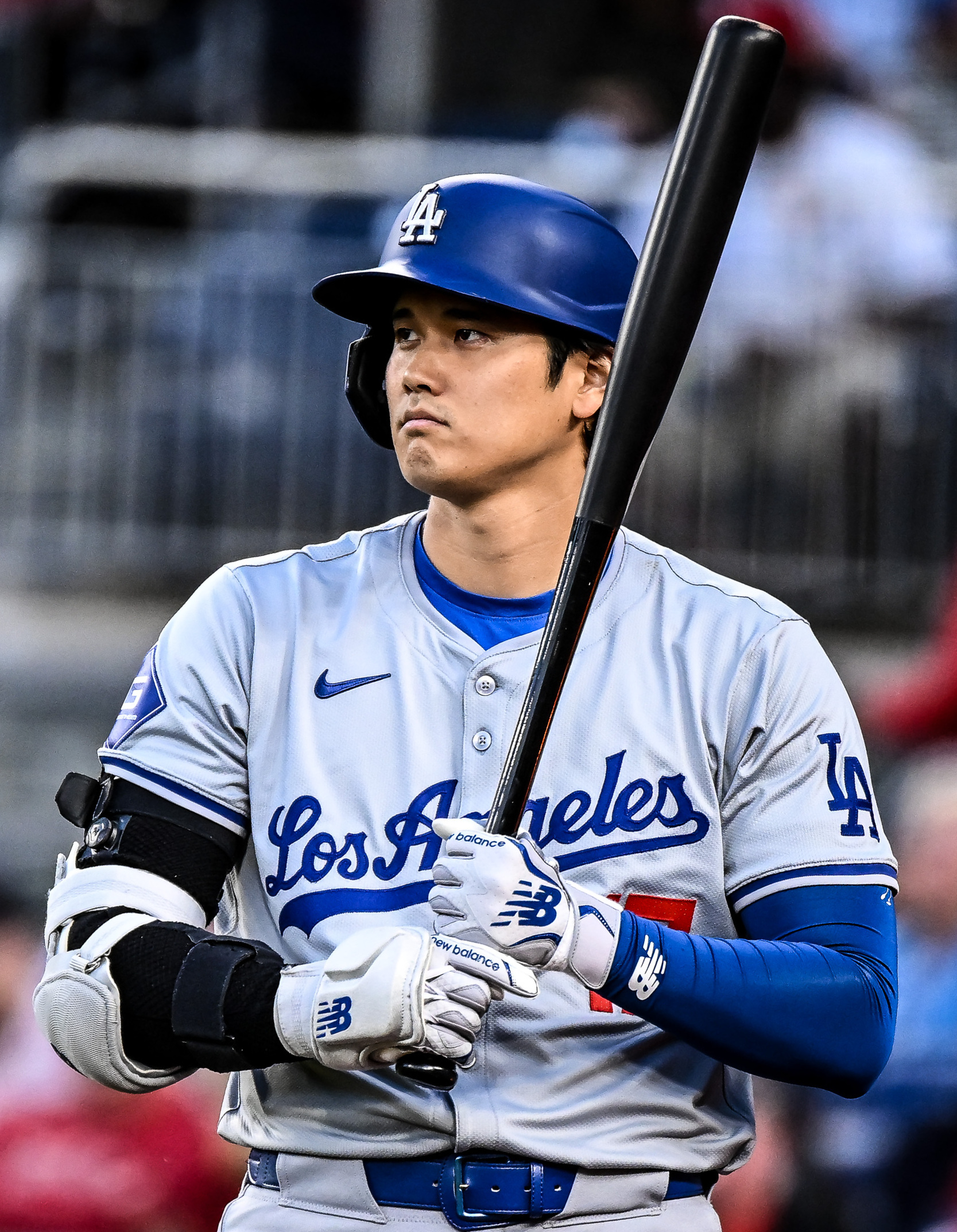
Shohei Ohtani is currently the only player to win the award four times by unanimous vote and the only player to win multiple MVP's in each league.

Year	American League winner	Team	Position	National League winner	Team	Position	Ref
1931	Lefty Grove^{†}	Philadelphia Athletics*	LHP	Frankie Frisch^{†}	St. Louis Cardinals*	2B	
1932	Jimmie Foxx^{†}	Philadelphia Athletics	1B	Chuck Klein^{†}	Philadelphia Phillies	OF	
1933	Jimmie Foxx^{†} (2)	Philadelphia Athletics	1B	Carl Hubbell^{†}	New York Giants*	LHP	
1934	Mickey Cochrane^{†} (2)	Detroit Tigers*	C	Dizzy Dean^{†}	St. Louis Cardinals*	RHP	
1935	Hank Greenberg^{†§}	Detroit Tigers*	1B	Gabby Hartnett^{†}	Chicago Cubs*	C	
1936	Lou Gehrig^{†} (2)	New York Yankees*	1B	Carl Hubbell^{†§} (2)	New York Giants*	LHP	
1937	Charlie Gehringer^{†}	Detroit Tigers	2B	Joe Medwick^{†}	St. Louis Cardinals	OF	
1938	Jimmie Foxx^{†} (3)	Boston Red Sox	1B	Ernie Lombardi^{†}	Cincinnati Reds	C	
1939	Joe DiMaggio^{†}	New York Yankees*	OF	Bucky Walters	Cincinnati Reds*	RHP	
1940	Hank Greenberg^{†} (2)	Detroit Tigers*	OF	Frank McCormick	Cincinnati Reds*	1B	
1941	Joe DiMaggio^{†} (2)	New York Yankees*	OF	Dolph Camilli	Brooklyn Dodgers*	1B	
1942	Joe Gordon^{†}	New York Yankees*	2B	Mort Cooper	St. Louis Cardinals*	RHP	
1943	Spud Chandler	New York Yankees*	RHP	Stan Musial^{†}	St. Louis Cardinals*	OF	
1944	Hal Newhouser^{†}	Detroit Tigers	LHP	Marty Marion	St. Louis Cardinals*	SS	
1945	Hal Newhouser^{†} (2)	Detroit Tigers*	LHP	Phil Cavarretta	Chicago Cubs*	1B	
1946	Ted Williams^{†}	Boston Red Sox*	OF	Stan Musial^{†} (2)	St. Louis Cardinals*	1B	
1947	Joe DiMaggio^{†} (3)	New York Yankees*	OF	Bob Elliott	Boston Braves	3B	
1948	Lou Boudreau^{†}	Cleveland Indians*	SS	Stan Musial^{†} (3)	St. Louis Cardinals	OF	
1949	Ted Williams^{†} (2)	Boston Red Sox	OF	Jackie Robinson^{†}	Brooklyn Dodgers*	2B	
1950	Phil Rizzuto^{†}	New York Yankees*	SS	Jim Konstanty	Philadelphia Phillies*	RHP	
1951	Yogi Berra^{†}	New York Yankees*	C	Roy Campanella^{†}	Brooklyn Dodgers	C	
1952	Bobby Shantz	Philadelphia Athletics	LHP	Hank Sauer	Chicago Cubs	OF	
1953	Al Rosen^{§}	Cleveland Indians	3B	Roy Campanella^{†} (2)	Brooklyn Dodgers*	C	
1954	Yogi Berra^{†} (2)	New York Yankees	C	Willie Mays^{†}	New York Giants*	OF	
1955	Yogi Berra^{†} (3)	New York Yankees*	C	Roy Campanella^{†} (3)	Brooklyn Dodgers*	C	
1956	Mickey Mantle^{†§}	New York Yankees*	OF	Don Newcombe	Brooklyn Dodgers*	RHP	
1957	Mickey Mantle^{†} (2)	New York Yankees*	OF	Hank Aaron^{†}	Milwaukee Braves*	OF	
1958	Jackie Jensen	Boston Red Sox	OF	Ernie Banks^{†}	Chicago Cubs	SS	
1959	Nellie Fox^{†}	Chicago White Sox*	2B	Ernie Banks^{†} (2)	Chicago Cubs	SS	
1960	Roger Maris	New York Yankees*	OF	Dick Groat	Pittsburgh Pirates*	SS	
1961	Roger Maris (2)	New York Yankees*	OF	Frank Robinson^{†}	Cincinnati Reds*	OF	
1962	Mickey Mantle^{†} (3)	New York Yankees*	OF	Maury Wills	Los Angeles Dodgers	SS	
1963	Elston Howard	New York Yankees*	C	Sandy Koufax^{†}	Los Angeles Dodgers*	LHP	
1964	Brooks Robinson^{†}	Baltimore Orioles	3B	Ken Boyer	St. Louis Cardinals*	3B	
1965	Zoilo Versalles	Minnesota Twins*	SS	Willie Mays^{†} (2)	San Francisco Giants	OF	
1966	Frank Robinson^{†§} (2)	Baltimore Orioles*	OF	Roberto Clemente^{†}	Pittsburgh Pirates	OF	
1967	Carl Yastrzemski^{†}	Boston Red Sox*	OF	Orlando Cepeda^{†§}	St. Louis Cardinals*	1B	
1968	Denny McLain^{§}	Detroit Tigers*	RHP	Bob Gibson^{†}	St. Louis Cardinals*	RHP	
1969	Harmon Killebrew^{†}	Minnesota Twins	3B	Willie McCovey^{†}	San Francisco Giants	1B	
1970	Boog Powell	Baltimore Orioles*	1B	Johnny Bench^{†}	Cincinnati Reds*	C	
1971	Vida Blue	Oakland Athletics	LHP	Joe Torre^{†}^{[c]}	St. Louis Cardinals	3B	
1972	Dick Allen^{†}	Chicago White Sox	1B	Johnny Bench^{†} (2)	Cincinnati Reds*	C	
1973	Reggie Jackson^{†§}	Oakland Athletics*	OF	Pete Rose	Cincinnati Reds	OF	
1974	Jeff Burroughs	Texas Rangers	OF	Steve Garvey	Los Angeles Dodgers*	1B	
1975	Fred Lynn	Boston Red Sox*	OF	Joe Morgan^{†}	Cincinnati Reds*	2B	
1976	Thurman Munson	New York Yankees*	C	Joe Morgan^{†} (2)	Cincinnati Reds*	2B	
1977	Rod Carew^{†}	Minnesota Twins	1B	George Foster	Cincinnati Reds	OF	
1978	Jim Rice^{†}	Boston Red Sox	OF	Dave Parker^{†}	Pittsburgh Pirates	OF	
1979	Don Baylor	California Angels	LF/DH	Keith Hernandez^{[d]}	St. Louis Cardinals	1B	
1979	Don Baylor	California Angels	LF/DH	Willie Stargell^{†}^{[d]}	Pittsburgh Pirates*	1B	
1980	George Brett^{†}	Kansas City Royals*	3B	Mike Schmidt^{†§}	Philadelphia Phillies*	3B	
1981	Rollie Fingers^{†}	Milwaukee Brewers	RHP	Mike Schmidt^{†} (2)	Philadelphia Phillies	3B	
1982	Robin Yount^{†}	Milwaukee Brewers*	SS	Dale Murphy	Atlanta Braves	OF	
1983	Cal Ripken Jr.^{†}	Baltimore Orioles*	SS	Dale Murphy (2)	Atlanta Braves	OF	
1984	Willie Hernández	Detroit Tigers*	LHP	Ryne Sandberg^{†}	Chicago Cubs	2B	
1985	Don Mattingly	New York Yankees	1B	Willie McGee	St. Louis Cardinals*	OF	
1986	Roger Clemens	Boston Red Sox*	RHP	Mike Schmidt^{†} (3)	Philadelphia Phillies	3B	
1987	George Bell	Toronto Blue Jays	OF	Andre Dawson^{†}	Chicago Cubs	OF	
1988	Jose Canseco^{§}	Oakland Athletics*	OF	Kirk Gibson	Los Angeles Dodgers*	OF	
1989	Robin Yount^{†} (2)	Milwaukee Brewers	OF	Kevin Mitchell	San Francisco Giants*	OF	
1990	Rickey Henderson^{†}	Oakland Athletics*	OF	Barry Bonds	Pittsburgh Pirates	OF	
1991	Cal Ripken Jr.^{†} (2)	Baltimore Orioles	SS	Terry Pendleton	Atlanta Braves*	3B	
1992	Dennis Eckersley^{†}	Oakland Athletics	RHP	Barry Bonds (2)	Pittsburgh Pirates	OF	
1993	Frank Thomas^{†§}	Chicago White Sox	1B	Barry Bonds (3)	San Francisco Giants	OF	
1994	Frank Thomas^{†} (2)	Chicago White Sox	1B	Jeff Bagwell^{†§}	Houston Astros	1B	
1995	Mo Vaughn	Boston Red Sox	1B	Barry Larkin^{†}	Cincinnati Reds	SS	
1996	Juan González	Texas Rangers	OF	Ken Caminiti^{§}	San Diego Padres	3B	
1997	Ken Griffey Jr.^{†§}	Seattle Mariners	OF	Larry Walker^{†}	Colorado Rockies	OF	
1998	Juan González (2)	Texas Rangers	OF	Sammy Sosa	Chicago Cubs	OF	
1999	Iván Rodríguez^{†}	Texas Rangers	C	Chipper Jones^{†}	Atlanta Braves*	3B	
2000	Jason Giambi	Oakland Athletics	1B	Jeff Kent^{†}	San Francisco Giants	2B	
2001	Ichiro Suzuki^{†}	Seattle Mariners	OF	Barry Bonds (4)	San Francisco Giants	OF	
2002	Miguel Tejada	Oakland Athletics	SS	Barry Bonds^{§} (5)	San Francisco Giants*	OF	
2003	Alex Rodriguez	Texas Rangers	SS	Barry Bonds (6)	San Francisco Giants	OF	
2004	Vladimir Guerrero^{†}	Anaheim Angels	OF	Barry Bonds (7)	San Francisco Giants	OF	
2005	Alex Rodriguez (2)	New York Yankees	3B	Albert Pujols	St. Louis Cardinals	1B	
2006	Justin Morneau	Minnesota Twins	1B	Ryan Howard	Philadelphia Phillies	1B	
2007	Alex Rodriguez (3)	New York Yankees	3B	Jimmy Rollins	Philadelphia Phillies	SS	
2008	Dustin Pedroia	Boston Red Sox	2B	Albert Pujols (2)	St. Louis Cardinals	1B	
2009	Joe Mauer^{†}	Minnesota Twins	C	Albert Pujols^{§} (3)	St. Louis Cardinals	1B	
2010	Josh Hamilton	Texas Rangers*	OF	Joey Votto	Cincinnati Reds	1B	
2011	Justin Verlander	Detroit Tigers	RHP	Ryan Braun	Milwaukee Brewers	OF	
2012	Miguel Cabrera	Detroit Tigers*	3B	Buster Posey	San Francisco Giants*	C	
2013	Miguel Cabrera (2)	Detroit Tigers	3B	Andrew McCutchen^{^}	Pittsburgh Pirates	OF	
2014	Mike Trout^{^§}	Los Angeles Angels	OF	Clayton Kershaw	Los Angeles Dodgers	LHP	
2015	Josh Donaldson	Toronto Blue Jays	3B	Bryce Harper^{^§}	Washington Nationals	OF	
2016	Mike Trout^{^} (2)	Los Angeles Angels	OF	Kris Bryant^{^}	Chicago Cubs*	3B/OF	
2017	Jose Altuve^{^}	Houston Astros*	2B	Giancarlo Stanton^{^}	Miami Marlins	OF	
2018	Mookie Betts^{^}	Boston Red Sox*	OF	Christian Yelich^{^}	Milwaukee Brewers	OF	
2019	Mike Trout^{^} (3)	Los Angeles Angels	OF	Cody Bellinger^{^}	Los Angeles Dodgers	OF	
2020	José Abreu	Chicago White Sox	1B	Freddie Freeman^{^}	Atlanta Braves	1B	
2021	Shohei Ohtani^{^§}	Los Angeles Angels	RHP/DH	Bryce Harper^{^} (2)	Philadelphia Phillies	OF	
2022	Aaron Judge^{^}	New York Yankees	OF	Paul Goldschmidt^{^}	St. Louis Cardinals	1B	
2023	Shohei Ohtani^{^§} (2)	Los Angeles Angels	RHP/DH	Ronald Acuña Jr.^{^§}	Atlanta Braves	OF	
2024	Aaron Judge^{^§} (2)	New York Yankees*	OF	Shohei Ohtani^{^§} (3)	Los Angeles Dodgers*	DH	
2025	Aaron Judge^{^} (3)	New York Yankees	OF	Shohei Ohtani^{^§} (4)	Los Angeles Dodgers*	DH/RHP	
2026	Yordan Alvarez^{^§}	Houston Astros	DH	Pete Crow-Armstrong^{^§}	Chicago Cubs	CF	

== Multiple MVP winners ==
Player	# of Awards	Years
Barry Bonds	7	1990, 1992, 1993, 2001, 2002, 2003, 2004
Shohei Ohtani^{^}	4	2021, 2023, 2024, 2025
Yogi Berra ^{†}	3	1951, 1954, 1955
Roy Campanella ^{†}	3	1951, 1953, 1955
Joe DiMaggio ^{†}	3	1939, 1941, 1947
Jimmie Foxx ^{†}	3	1932, 1933, 1938
Aaron Judge^{^}	3	2022, 2024, 2025
Mickey Mantle ^{†}	3	1956, 1957, 1962
Stan Musial ^{†}	3	1943, 1946, 1948
Albert Pujols	3	2005, 2008, 2009
Alex Rodriguez	3	2003, 2005, 2007
Mike Schmidt ^{†}	3	1980, 1981, 1986
Mike Trout^{^}	3	2014, 2016, 2019
Ernie Banks ^{†}	2	1958, 1959
Johnny Bench ^{†}	2	1970, 1972
Miguel Cabrera	2	2012, 2013
Mickey Cochrane ^{†}	2	1928, 1934
Lou Gehrig ^{†}	2	1927, 1936
Juan González	2	1996, 1998
Hank Greenberg ^{†}	2	1935, 1940
Bryce Harper^{^}	2	2015, 2021
Rogers Hornsby ^{†}	2	1925, 1929
Carl Hubbell ^{†}	2	1933, 1936
Walter Johnson ^{†}	2	1913, 1924
Roger Maris	2	1960, 1961
Willie Mays ^{†}	2	1954, 1965
Joe Morgan ^{†}	2	1975, 1976
Dale Murphy	2	1982, 1983
Hal Newhouser ^{†}	2	1944, 1945
Cal Ripken Jr. ^{†}	2	1983, 1991
Frank Robinson ^{†}	2	1961, 1966
Frank Thomas ^{†}	2	1993, 1994
Ted Williams ^{†}	2	1946, 1949
Robin Yount ^{†}	2	1982, 1989

== Wins by team ==
Teams	Awards	Years
New York Yankees	25	1923, 1927, 1936, 1939, 1941–1943, 1947, 1950, 1951, 1954–1957, 1960–1963, 1976, 1985, 2005, 2007, 2022, 2024, 2025
St. Louis Cardinals	21	1925, 1926, 1928, 1931, 1934, 1937, 1942–1944, 1946, 1948, 1964, 1967, 1968, 1971, 1979, 1985, 2005, 2008, 2009, 2022
Brooklyn/Los Angeles Dodgers	16	1913, 1924, 1941, 1949, 1951, 1953, 1955, 1956, 1962, 1963, 1974, 1988, 2014, 2019, 2024, 2025
New York/San Francisco Giants	14	1912, 1933, 1936, 1954, 1965, 1969, 1989, 1993, 2000–2004, 2012
Philadelphia/Oakland Athletics	13	1914, 1928, 1931–1933, 1952, 1971, 1973, 1988, 1990, 1992, 2000, 2002
Cincinnati Reds	12	1938–1940, 1961, 1970, 1972, 1973, 1975–1977, 1995, 2010
Detroit Tigers	12	1911, 1934, 1935, 1937, 1940, 1944, 1945, 1968, 1984, 2011–2013
Boston Red Sox	12	1912, 1938, 1946, 1949, 1958, 1967, 1975, 1978, 1986, 1995, 2008, 2018
Chicago Cubs	12	1911, 1929, 1935, 1945, 1952, 1958, 1959, 1984, 1987, 1998, 2016, 2026
Boston/Milwaukee/Atlanta Braves	9	1914, 1947, 1957, 1982, 1983, 1991, 1999, 2020, 2023
Washington Senators/Minnesota Twins	8	1913, 1924, 1925, 1965, 1969, 1977, 2006, 2009
Pittsburgh Pirates	8	1927, 1960, 1966, 1978, 1979, 1990, 1992, 2013
Philadelphia Phillies	8	1932, 1950, 1980, 1981, 1986, 2006, 2007, 2021
California/Anaheim/Los Angeles Angels	7	1979, 2004, 2014, 2016, 2019, 2021, 2023
Baltimore Orioles/St. Louis Browns	6	1922, 1964, 1966, 1970, 1983, 1991
Texas Rangers	6	1974, 1996, 1998, 1999, 2003, 2010
Milwaukee Brewers	5	1981, 1982, 1989, 2011, 2018
Chicago White Sox	5	1959, 1972, 1993, 1994, 2020
Cleveland Indians / Guardians	3	1926, 1948, 1953
Houston Astros	3	1994, 2017, 2026
Seattle Mariners	2	1997, 2001
Toronto Blue Jays	2	1987, 2015
Kansas City Royals	1	1980
San Diego Padres	1	1996
Colorado Rockies	1	1997
Washington Nationals	1	2015
Miami Marlins	1	2017
Arizona Diamondbacks	0	none
New York Mets	0	none
Tampa Bay Rays	0	none

== See also ==
- "Players Choice Awards" Player of the Year (in MLB; all positions) (there are also Outstanding Player and Outstanding Pitcher awards (in each league))
- Baseball America Major League Player of the Year (in MLB; all positions)
- Baseball Digest Player of the Year (in MLB; position players only; from 1969 to 1993, included all positions; in 1994, a separate Pitcher of the Year award was added)
- Best Major League Baseball Player ESPY Award (in MLB; all positions)
- "GIBBY/Esurance MLB Awards" Best Major Leaguer (in MLB; all positions) (there are also Best Hitter and Best Pitcher awards) (discontinued in 2017)
- The Sporting News Most Valuable Player Award (in each league) (discontinued in 1946)
- The Sporting News Player of the Year (in MLB; position players only)
- List of Major League Baseball awards
- Baseball awards

== Notes ==
- ^{a} A player is considered inactive if he has announced his retirement or has not played for a full season.
- ^{b} A unanimous victory indicates that the player received all possible first-place votes.
- ^{c} Torre is a member of the Hall of Fame, but not as a player. He was inducted in 2014 as a manager.
- ^{d} Hernandez and Stargell both received 216 points in the 1979 voting.
