= Thomas-Detroit (automobile) =

American automaker

The Thomas-Detroit was an automobile manufactured by the E.R. Thomas-Detroit Co of Detroit, Michigan, from 1906-08. The 1908 version was powered by a 6.1 L 4-cylinder engine with two spark plugs per cylinder. The drive line consisted of a 3-speed transmission with a drive shaft. The company later became the Chalmers Motor Company.

== See also ==
- Thomas Motor Company
