= 1910 Chalmers Award =

Early 20th-century baseball incident

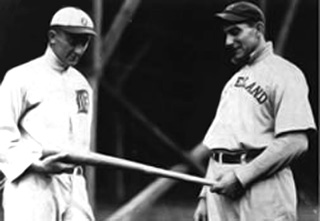
Ty Cobb and Nap Lajoie

The 1910 Chalmers Award was one of the first attempts to honor Major League Baseball's top players. Introduced by Hugh Chalmers, president of the Chalmers Motor Car Company, the award promised a luxurious Chalmers Model 30 to the player with the highest batting average for the 1910 season. The initiative symbolized the emerging relationship between sports and commercial endorsements.

The award became the center of a major controversy involving Ty Cobb of the Detroit Tigers and Napoleon Lajoie of the Cleveland Naps, both future Hall of Famers. The competition for the title was intense, culminating in a controversial final day of the season in which tactics employed by the St. Louis Browns, playing against Lajoie, were questioned for their fairness. Chalmers awarded an automobile to both Cobb and Lajoie.

The 1910 Chalmers Award is notable not only for the controversy it engendered but also for its role in shaping future accolades in baseball. It set a precedent for recognizing player excellence, leading to the development of the Most Valuable Player Award in subsequent decades. The Chalmers Award was presented annually until 1914, when it was discontinued.

== Background ==
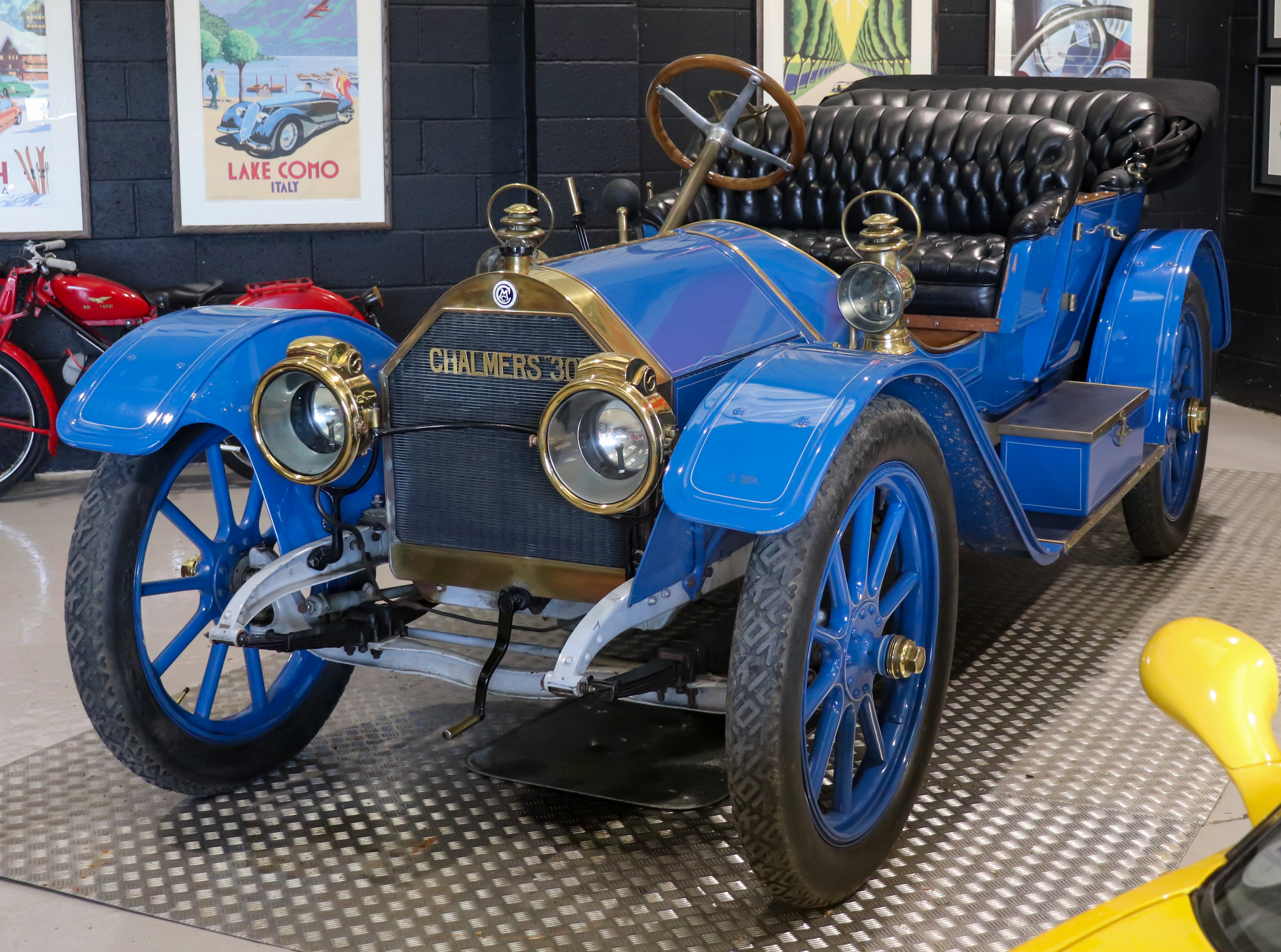
Chalmers Model 30 automobile

Before the 1910 Major League Baseball season, Hugh Chalmers of the Chalmers Automobile Company announced a promotion in which a Chalmers Model 30 automobile would be awarded to the batting champions for Major League Baseball's American and National Leagues.

At the start of the final day of the season, Ty Cobb of the Detroit Tigers held a slim lead in the race for the American League batting title, just a few percentage points ahead of the Cleveland Naps' Nap Lajoie. Cobb was generally disliked by opponents but Lajoie was popular.

== Controversy ==
Cobb did not play in the Tigers' final two games of the season and finished with a batting average of .385.

Lajoie played in a doubleheader on the last day of the season against the St. Louis Browns. Jack O'Connor, the Browns' manager, allegedly ordered rookie third baseman Red Corriden to play on the outfield grass. This all but conceded a base hit for any ball that Lajoie bunted. Lajoie finished with eight hits in eight at-bats, resulting in a season batting average of .384 (227 hits in 591 at-bats). His final at-bat resulted in a wild throw to first base, which was scored as an error. Under baseball rules, when a player reaches base on a fielding error, it is treated as a hitless at-bat, thus lowering the hitter's batting average.

== Aftermath ==
After news broke of the scandal, a writer for the St. Louis Post claimed: "All St. Louis is up in arms over the deplorable spectacle, conceived in stupidity and executed in jealousy." The issue was brought to American League president Ban Johnson, who declared all batting averages official and Cobb the champion (.385069 to .384095). However, Chalmers awarded automobiles to both Cobb and Lajoie, essentially declaring a tie. O'Connor and coach Harry Howell, who tried to bribe the official scorer to change the error to a hit, were banned from baseball for their roles in the affair.

For the following season, Chalmers gave its award to the league's most valuable player instead of the player with the highest batting average. Cobb won the Chalmers Award in 1911 in his best year, hitting .420. Chalmers continued the award through the 1914 season, after which it was discontinued. Chalmers ceased operations in 1923, although it was a predecessor to the modern company Chrysler. Cobb and Lajoie were eventually elected into the Baseball Hall of Fame.

== Modern revision ==
In 1978, sports statistician Pete Palmer discovered a 1910 discrepancy in Cobb's career hit total, and the story was broken by The Sporting News in April 1981. Cobb is credited with 4,191-lifetime hits (still the total on MLB.com), but a 1910 Detroit Tigers box score was counted twice in the season-ending calculations. The mistake caused the statisticians to award Cobb an extra 2-for-3, which credited him with two non-existent hits and erroneously raised his 1910 batting average from .383 to .385. As Lajoie had a .384 average for the season, the revised figure would have cost Cobb one of his 12 batting titles, reduced his career average to .366 and given the 1910 batting championship to Lajoie. The mathematical mistake was described by one writer as follows: "It could be said that 1910 produced two bogus leading batting averages and one questionable champion."
