= Chalmers Automobile =

American car manufacturer from 1908 to 1923

Chalmers Motor Company
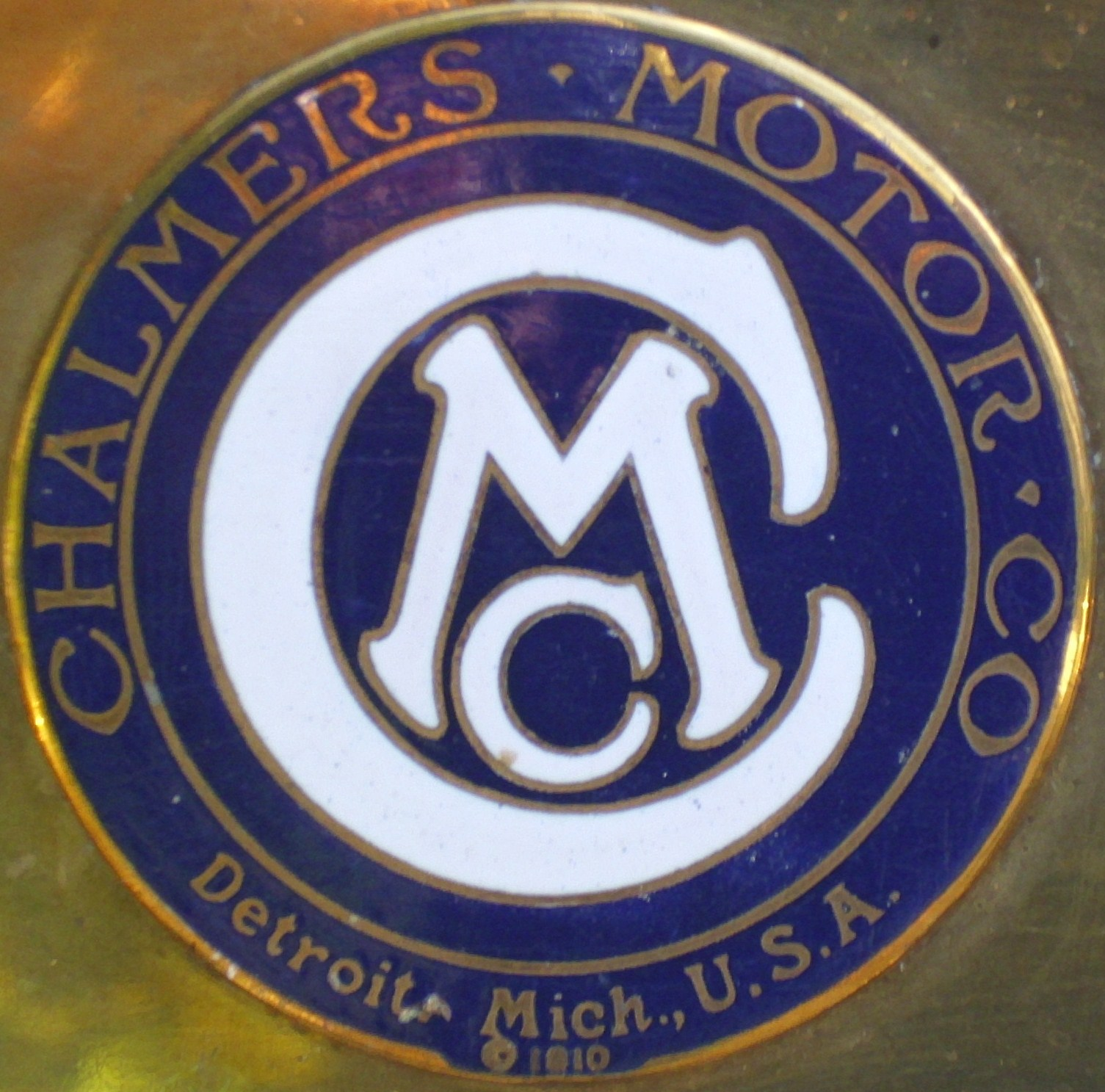
- Industry: Automobile
- Founded: 1908
- Founder: Hugh Chalmers
- Defunct: 1923
- Fate: Merged with Maxwell automobile renamed Chrysler
- Headquarters: Detroit, Michigan, US
- Products: Open touring car; Sedan; Limousine

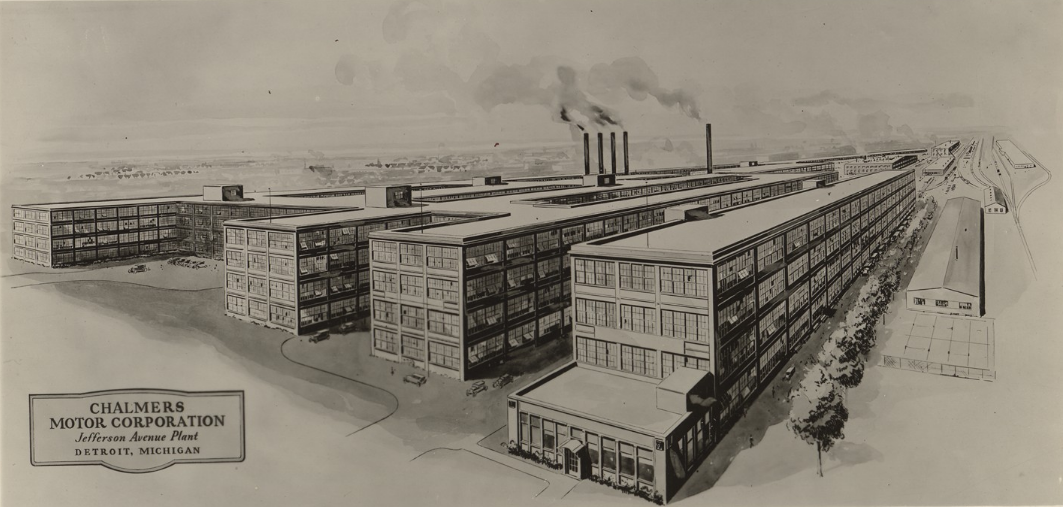
Chalmers Motor Company Jefferson Avenue factory, Detroit, 1913

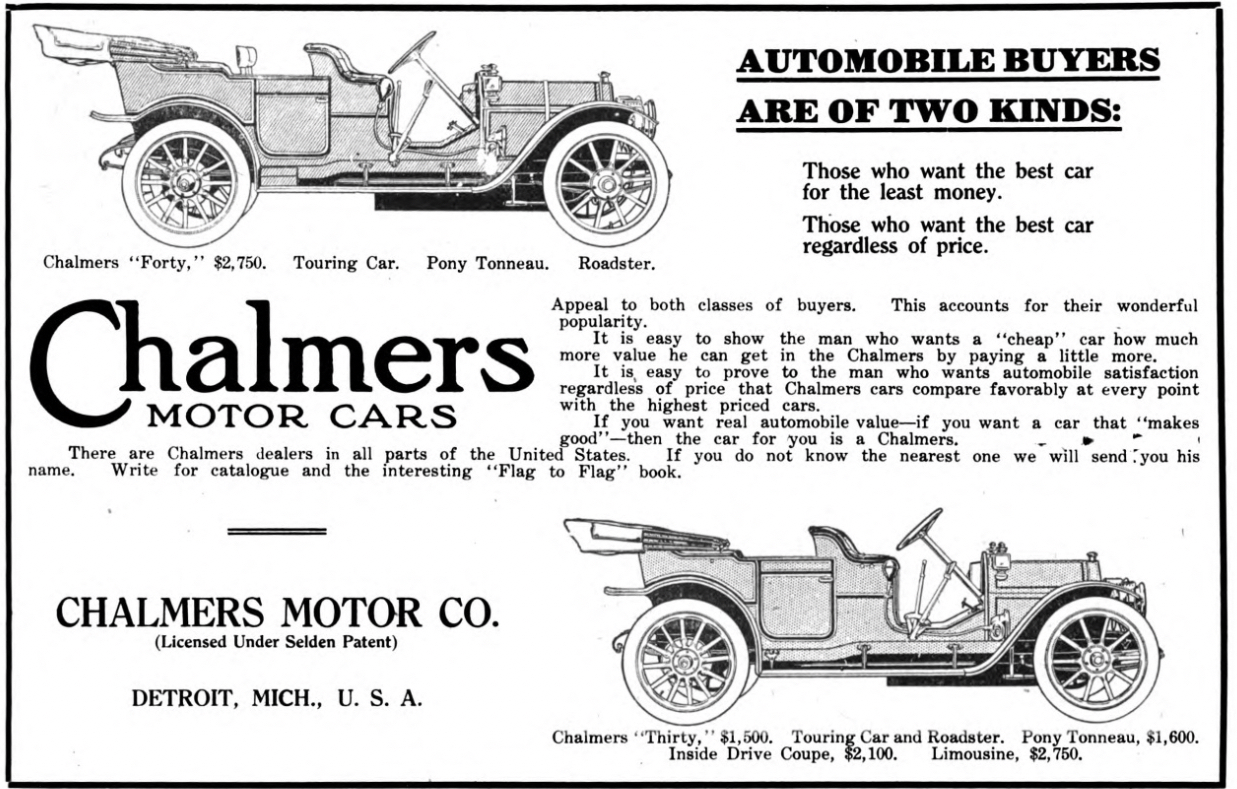
Chalmers advertisement (1910)

The Chalmers Motor Company was an American automobile manufacturer headquartered in Detroit, Michigan. Founded in 1908 by Hugh Chalmers, the company was known for producing high-end vehicles. Chalmers automobiles gained recognition for their toughness, durability, and engineering receiving particular praise for their performance in touring events. The company reached its peak in 1911, becoming the eighth-largest auto producer in the United States. Despite initial success, the company faced challenges with increasing competition in the auto industry, and sales began to decline in the following years. In 1923, Chalmers Motor Company merged with Maxwell Motor, ultimately forming the basis for the Chrysler Corporation.

== History ==
=== Origin ===
Hugh Chalmers, born in 1873, started working at National Cash Register Company in Dayton, Ohio, at age 14 and eventually became vice president. In 1907, car-maker Roy Chapin at Thomas-Detroit began to make offers to Hugh Chalmers to take over the company. Roy Chapin was concerned about the Thomas-Detroit's reliance on the company's sales network. Chapin persuaded Chalmers to become president of Thomas-Detroit and build a solid independent sales force. Hugh Chalmers purchased ER Thomas's interests in the Thomas-Detroit company.

Chalmers convinced NCR salesman Joseph Fields to join him in Detroit to set up dealerships across the U.S. In 1907 or 1909, Chalmers built a factory on Jefferson Avenue in Detroit which would survive until 1991 under Chrysler while the headquarters was in Highland Park, Michigan.

The stockholders voted to rename the company the Chalmers-Detroit Motor Company on June 15, 1908, and later the Chalmers Motor Company on January 26, 1910.

The first car was the Chalmers-Detroit 30 in 1908. Sales of 3,047 automobiles resulted in revenues of $4,754,929 and profits of $1,015,823 for the year ending June 30, 1909, although the paid-in capital stock was just $300,000.

It was in the early years of the Chalmers automobile brand, specifically in 1909 and 1910, that the company produced a model called the Chalmers-Detroit. Production during these two years was not high, and it was not until 1911 that the Chalmers car (without the Detroit name) was officially introduced. The Chalmers-Detroit cars were known for their toughness and durability, and they won 69 major competitions during their production period. One of the notable competitions won by the Chalmers-Detroit was the Indiana Cup, and another was the 1910 Glidden tour, where a Model 30 car achieved victory. These early Chalmers cars, particularly the Model 30 and Model 40, were praised for their engineering and performance, and they continue to be regarded as some of the best cars for touring events. Notably, the Model T Ford, which was produced from 1908 to 1927, used the same oil in both its crankcase and transmission case, a design that did not cause any bearing problems and was similar to that of the Chalmers-Detroit.

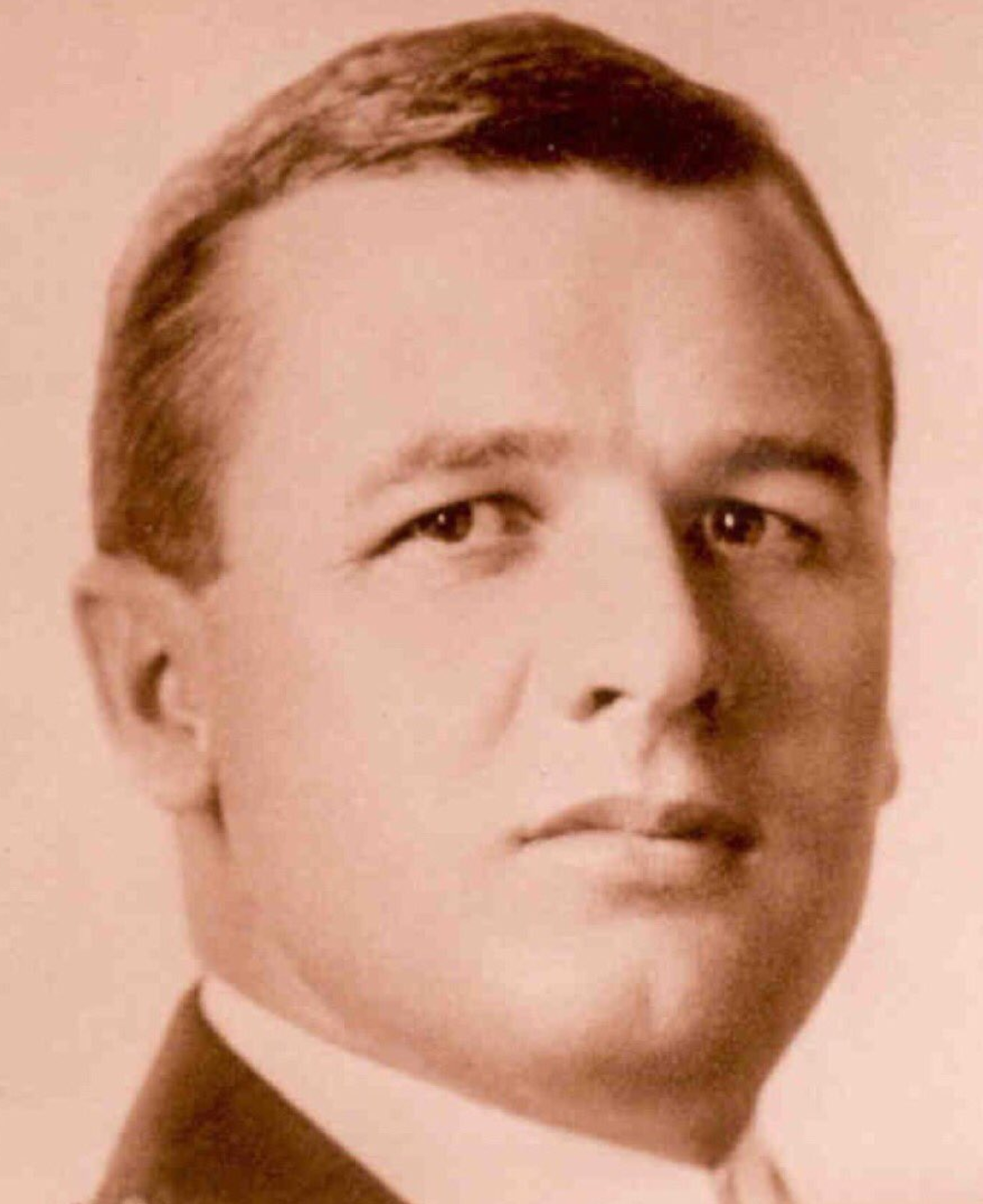
Hugh Chalmers

=== Hudson Motor Car Company ===
Roscoe Jackson and Howard Dunham, two of Howard Coffin's employees at Oldsmobile, built a new lightweight car, the Model 20, intended to sell for under $1,000. Still, Chapin and Coffin could not persuade Hugh Chalmers to join the project. Chalmers Motors' early success was due primarily due to Roy Chapin as Treasurer and general manager, and Howard Coffin as Chief Engineer.

On October 28, 1908, Chapin, Coffin, and others formed the Hudson Motor Car Company to pursue their desires to build a smaller car. Roscoe Jackson was married to the niece of Detroit department store mogul Joseph L. Hudson. Hudson invested $90,000 in the endeavor and gave the company his name. Hugh Chalmers was also a prominent investor in Hudson.

In 1909–10, Hugh Chalmers and his partners sold their shares in Hudson to Chapin, and Chapin sold his stake in Chalmers Motors to Hugh Chalmers. Hudson built a factory across the street from the Chalmers plant to be close to suppliers and the railroad.

In December 1909, the Chalmers and Hudson companies parted ways. Chapin's concerns about the Chalmers firm's future were well-founded; over the next decade, the Hudson company prospered while the Chalmers company faltered.

=== Peak sales ===
Chalmers's best year was 1911 when it became the number eight auto producer in the U.S. The high point in sales was in 1911 when Chalmers sold 6,250 cars. Chalmers shareholders also did well. Preferred stock dividends paid out 7% per year and the common stock paid 2.5% annually.

Beginning in 1912, sales of Chalmers fell. Hugh Chalmers created Saxon Motors in 1913. From 1908 until 1913, the Chalmers Model 30's design remained unchanged, even as its price climbed past $2,000 per unit. Despite this, Chalmers was the ninth-largest vehicle manufacturer in the United States in 1910, with 6,350 cars sold.

By 1915 the auto-business was changing and became more competitive. The Chalmers survival was always at risk with over 250 automakers in the U.S.

Before World War I, the automobile economy was booming, but sales of Chalmers' cars were declining.

In 1915, the Chalmers Motor Company produced 9,833 automobiles before being renamed the Chalmers Motor Car Corporation. Hugh Chalmers was a superb salesman, but once Roy Chapin and his partners defected to Hudson, he could not attract and retain skilled, active engineers and manufacturing employees.

In November 1915, Chalmers presented his 1916 models to his dealers and sold 13,000 automobiles worth $22 million in less than an hour.

By the end of 1915, the company had over $8 million in real estate and machinery and employed between 7,000 and 8,000 people. According to one publication, Chalmers earned more than $1 million in 1915.

Because it was a low-volume, high-cost manufacturer, the Chalmers Motor Company struggled to stay afloat. In 1910–1914, the company produced about 6,200 vehicles per year, then boosted production to 9,833 units in 1915 and 21,408 cars in 1916.

In 1916, Chalmers set up a Canadian factory in Walkerville (Windsor), Ontario. At first, engines were manufactured by three outside suppliers, but Chalmers brought later engine manufacturing in-house. An advantage of the new Chalmers plant was its self-sufficiency.

The plant had a foundry to make engines, transmissions, axles, nuts, and bolts Chalmers wanted to make as many parts in-house and only bought specialized parts like sparkplugs and tires from outside suppliers.

Hugh Chalmers proposed in May 1916 that the corporation boost production to 60,000 automobiles per year while lowering prices or raising prices while lowering output. The actual results attained in 1916 demonstrate the company's issues. In the first half of the year, the Chalmers factory increased production, and the sales department supplied automobiles to dealers regardless of demand. As a result, a year's worth of cars was on hand at Chalmers distributors in Dallas and Omaha. Nevertheless, Hugh Chalmers was obliged to reduce production from 15,659 automobiles in the first half of 1916 to only 5,749 in the second. As a result, Chalmers remained a struggling automotive manufacturer with extra plant capacity from 1910 to 1917.

The company's finances improved in mid-1916 with better engine performance and improved body design, and the company moved from 14th to 12th place, but by late 1916 the company was close to bankruptcy.

=== Merger with Maxwell Motors ===
Beginning September 1, 1917, the Maxwell Motor Company bailed Chalmers by leasing its plants for five years. Maxwell received $3 million in operating capital from the Chalmers Motor Company, issuing $3.15 million in mortgage bonds.

When the U.S. entered World War I, demand weakened for the Chalmers while the Maxwell cars were outselling them. In 1917, Chalmers agreed to make Maxwell cars in the Chalmers' Jefferson Avenue plant while Maxwell would sell Chalmers cars through their dealer network.

Maxwell decided to keep the Chalmers car in production to preserve its good name and reputation. Maxwell also committed to pay the interest on the mortgage bonds and to contribute half of the net profits made on all autos produced in the Chalmers factories to the Chalmers firm. Hugh Chalmers moved up and out to become chairman of the board, and Walter E. Flanders, already president of the Maxwell Motor Company, became president of Chalmers. From 1917 until 1922, the Maxwell and Chalmers corporations shared the same managers, but the companies did not fully merge until 1922. Maxwell built the Chalmers line of automobiles until 1923.

Hugh Chalmers left for Washington, D.C., to work with the National Automobile Chamber of Commerce (NACC) as one of the "dollar a-year-men". During 1917, following the April United States Declaration of War against Germany, Maxwell Motor Co took over Chalmers' operations to make cars and trucks for the U.S. Government. Chalmers merged with the Maxwell automobile Company in 1922.

When Hugh Chalmers returned to Detroit in 1919, both companies now had financial problems, and in mid-1920, the bank creditors formed a reorganization committee. In 1920, Walter P. Chrysler joined the Maxwell automobile company and faced numerous challenges, one of which was the unsuccessful merger with Chalmers. Subsequently, due to mechanical issues that had negatively impacted Maxwell's reputation, the company revamped and rebranded the vehicle as the "Good Maxwell".

In late November 1921, Chalmers reduced prices for all models, and production was down to about 20 cars a day while Maxwell was selling more than 100 vehicles a day. Walter P. Chrysler reorganized the company and finally merged them into Chrysler in 1923.

Chase National Bank at that time had recruited the help of Walter P. Chrysler to rescue Willys Overland Company and Chalmers. Chalmers and Maxwell sued each other for millions of dollars. The Chalmers-Maxwell reorganization committee found that the lease agreement was too loose and poorly constructed.

Chrysler's financial and management overhaul of Maxwell in 1920–1922 was hindered by delays in Maxwell's takeover of Chalmers, which began in 1917. The convoluted strands of the Maxwell-Chalmers relationship are difficult to summarize. The original lease became increasingly unfavorable for Maxwell's shareholders as Chalmers' fortunes dropped after 1917 and Maxwell's performance improved. Maxwell was losing money on the Chalmers brand while splitting revenues from the more profitable Maxwell automobile with Chalmers investors. Both company' investors agreed to alter the original lease and merge the two companies. Still, the merger was delayed due to opposition by some Chalmers stockholders and threats of lawsuits.

Maxwell and Chalmers were hurt by a lack of material and rising costs after the war.

Walter Chrysler had the difficult task of reviving both Maxwell and Chalmers. In 1920, Chalmers' sales (almost 10,000 automobiles) were about a third of Maxwell's (34,000 cars), but by 1921, when Maxwell's sales had dropped to 16,000, Chalmers had only sold about 3,000 vehicles. As a result, Chalmers produced only 3,978 automobiles in 1922, a dismal performance compared to Maxwell's robust sales of 48,883 cars. In 1921, Maxwell stopped producing cars in the Chalmers plant.

For the calendar year 1922, Maxwell had a profit of $2,018,266; however, Chalmers' losses for the year ($1,325,524) decreased Maxwell's net profit to barely $700,000. A U.S. District Court judgment issued November 3, 1922, settled a lawsuit launched by the Fisk Rubber Company against Chalmers, ending the long-running feud between the Chalmers and Maxwell investors.

The court declared the Chalmers company bankrupt and ordered its assets to be auctioned off. On December 7, 1922, the Maxwell Motor Corporation purchased the Chalmers property for $1,987,600, completing a takeover that began in 1917.

The last Chalmers branded car was probably produced in January 1924. The old Chalmers plant started to produce Chryslers in 1924, but Chrysler produced Maxwell cars until 1925.

Maxwell-Chalmers-Chrysler Unit Sales, 1920–1925
	Maxwell	Chalmers	Chrysler	Total
1908		3,047	0	3,047
1909		4,500	0	4,500
1910		6,000	0	6,000
1911		6,250	0	6,250
1912		6,250	0	6,250
1913		6,250	0	6,250
1914		6,250	0	6,250
1915		9,833	0	9,833
1916		21,408	0	21,408
1917			0	
1918			0	
1919			0	
1920	34,000	10,000	0	44,000
1921	16,000	3,000	0	19,000
1922	48,883	5,989	0	54,872
1923	74,000	9,000	0	83,000
1924	50,622	0	31,667	82,289
1925	30,811	0	106,857	137,668

== Models ==
=== "Forty" ===
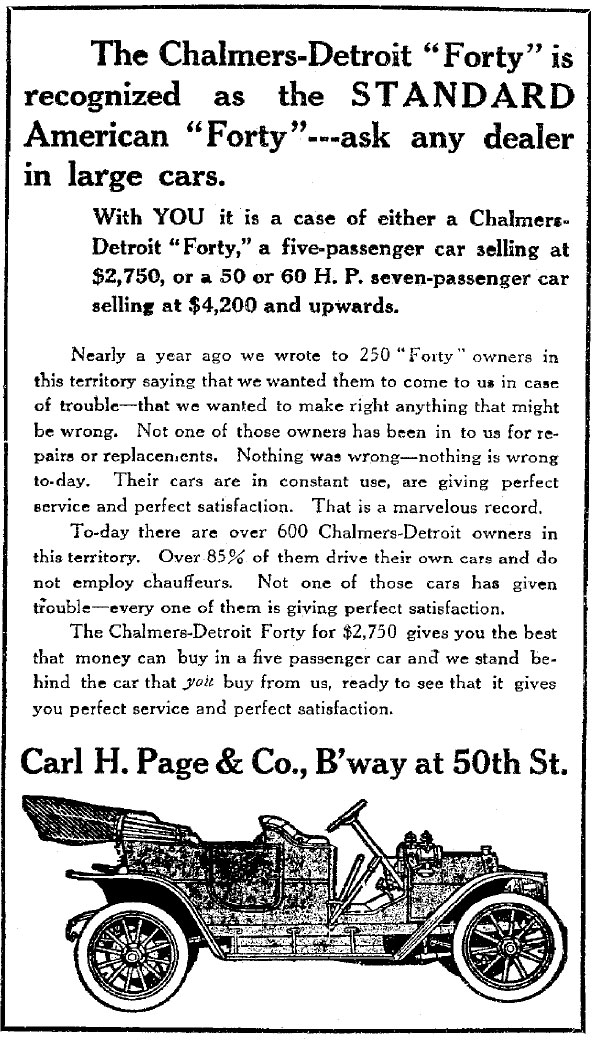
1909 "40"

The 1908 Model C "Forty" was similar to the Thomas-Detroit C "Forty" from the previous year, which was very similar to the vehicle designed by Howard Coffin, the 1906 Olds Model "A".

The engines were manufactured by other companies such as Westinghouse Machine Company, American, British Manufacturing Company, and Continental. In 1911 Chalmers started building most of its engines. The "Forty" engine's small radiator led to overheating.

The 40 Touring or Roadster sold for US$2750 while the 40 Torpedo sold for US$3000. This was less than American's lowest-price Model, which sold for US$4250.

=== "30" and "36" ===
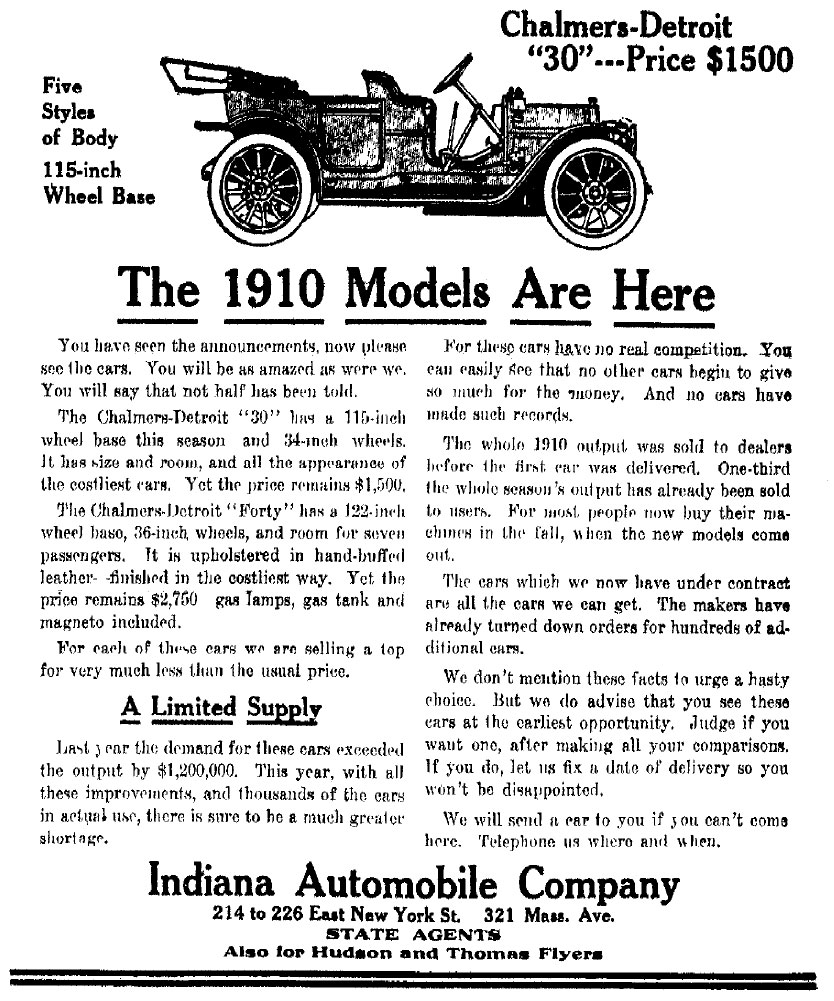
1910 Chalmers-Detroit advertisement - Indianapolis Star, October 10, 1909

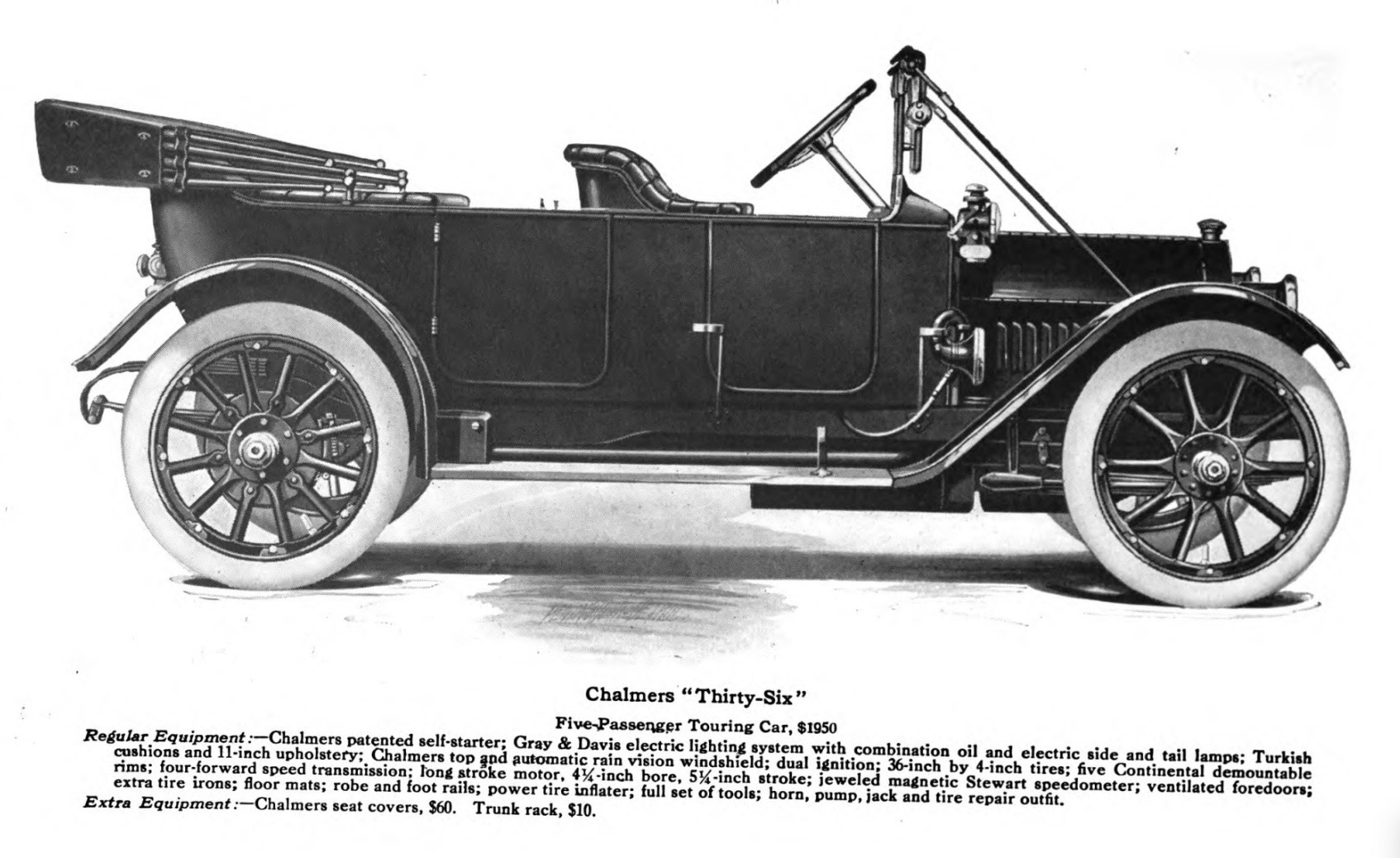
Chalmers Model 36 (1912-1914)

The "30" remained more or less the same, but the "36" (introduced in 1912) had a longer stroke and higher horsepower four-cylinder engine.

Nickel plate replaced the brass in cars as it was easier to maintain, and Gray & Davis electric headlights replaced the gas headlights. Chalmers produced only one truck type in its history and called it the Model 14 Delivery.

The Model "36" has a 4-speed transmission. The foot brake is combined with the clutch pedal, so it releases the clutch when pushed halfway.

Model	Production Years	Advertised HP	SAE HP	Cyl	Displacement	Bore (in)	Stroke (in)	Tire Size (in)	Wheel Base (in)
E	1908	40		4					
F	1908	24	24.03	4	3,479 cc (212.28 cu in)	3 7/8	4 1/2	32 X 3	110
30	1909-1911	24	24.03	4	3,479 cc (212.28 cu in)	3 7/8	4 1/2	32 X 3 1/2	110
40	1909-1911	40	40	4	6,113 cc (373.06 cu in)	5	4 3/4	34 X 4	112
J (40)	1910-1911	40	40	4	6,113 cc (373.06 cu in)	5	4 3/4	36 X 4	122
K (30)	1910-1913	30	25.6	4	3,707 cc (226.2 cu in)	4	4 1/2	34 X 3 1/2	115
L (40)	1910-1911	40	40	4	6,113 cc (373.06 cu in)	5	4 3/4	36 X 4	122
M (30)	1910-1913	30	25.6	4	3,707 cc (226.2 cu in)	4	4 1/2	34 X 3 1/2	115
9	1911–?	30	25.6	4	3,707 cc (226.2 cu in)	4	4 1/2	34 X 3 1/2	104
10	1912–?	30	25.6	4	4,882 cc (297.91 cu in)	4 1/4	5 1/4	36 X 4	115
11	1912–?	30	25.6	4	3,707 cc (226.2 cu in)	4	4 1/2	34 X 4	115
14	1912–?	30	25.6	4	3,707 cc (226.2 cu in)	4	4 1/2	34 X 5 1/2	115
16	1913–?	30	25.6	4	3,707 cc (226.2 cu in)	4	4 1/2	34 X 4	115
17	1912–14	36	28.9	4	4,882 cc (297.91 cu in)	4 1/4	5 1/4	36 X 4 36 X 4 1/2 37 X5	118
19	1914–?	36	28.9	4	4,882 cc (297.91 cu in)	4 1/4	5 1/4	36 X 4	118

The 30 Touring and the 30 Roadster sold for US$1500, when the Oldsmobile Runabout was priced at US$650, the Cole 30 sold for US$1500, and the Oakland 40 went for US$1600. The 30 Coupe at US$2400 was nearer the Enger 40 car at US$2400.

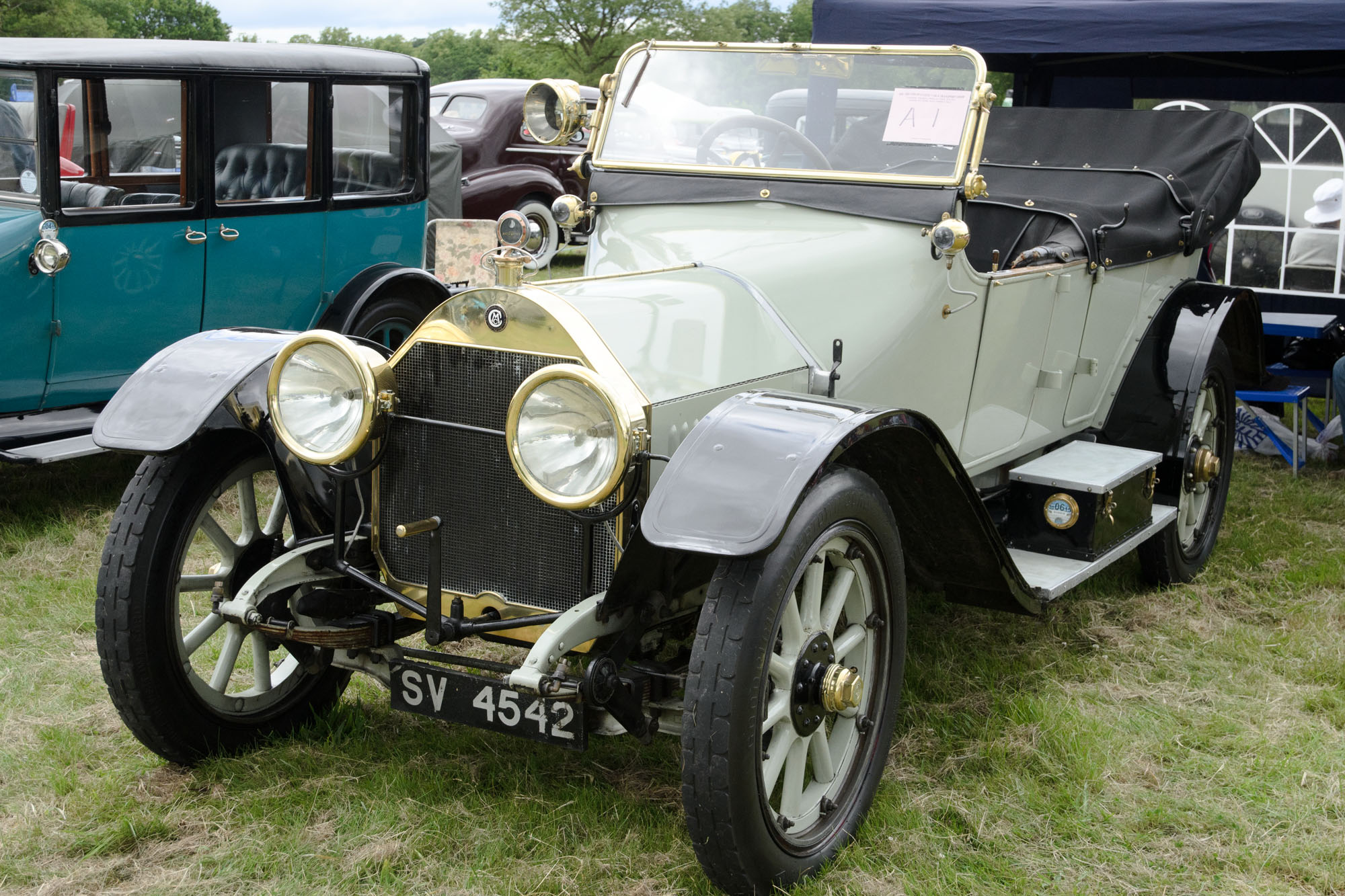
1913 Model 17 torpedo

=== "Six", "Light-6" and "Master Six" ===
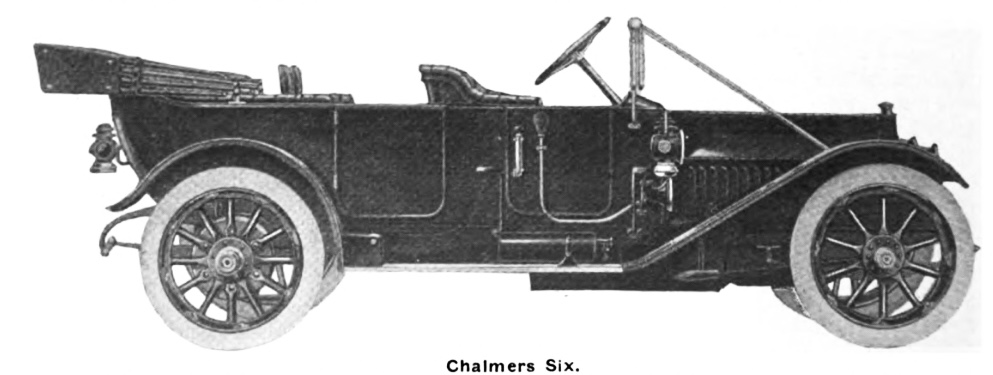
Chalmers Six (1912)

The first 6-cylinder was introduced in 1912 and called the Model 12 "Six". The company added a "Master Six" in September 1913 and "Light Six" at a New York show in January 1914. George Dunham developed the six cylinders. The "Light Six" and "Master Six" have a redesigned engine, clutch, and dashboard.

The "Six" Model Series Models 12 and 18 had overhead intake valves and a Rayfield carburetor. As a high-end car, the Six came with an engine-driven tire pump and a compressed air starting system.

=== Master Six Model 24 ===
Important improvements made their appearance in the Model 24. The Model 24, 7 passenger car, weighed 5475 pounds.

==== Engine ====
Model 24 was the first Chalmer's engine to use a long-stroke T-head, and the company claimed that it could not be stalled as it used a chain that ran with the engine that would restart the machine when it was about to stall. The exhausts were on the right, the intakes on the left, and the enclosed valve functioning elements contributed to the motor's silent operation.

The motor was brand new, and it came with T-head cylinders, an electric starter, a new forced-feed oiling system, and enclosed valve parts. The engine and the gearset were still one unit. One set of disks in the multiple-disk clutch featured cork inserts. The torsion rods were redesigned, and the rear springs were lowered. For the first time in a Chalmers model, the steering wheel was shifted to the left side, with the levers in the center. Also for the first time, the gasoline tank was carried in the back and fed by a pressure feed. The spare rims or wheels are kept in the back of the vehicle. It had a slightly smaller motor, a 2-inch larger wheelbase, and was $225 less in roadster and four and five-passenger models; $325 less in six-passenger models; $100 less as a limousine; and $50 more as a coupe when compared to the 1913 six. In addition, on the 1913 model, the new Chalmers-Entz combined electric starting and lighting system replaced the air starting method, and a single bosch ignition replaced the prior dual types ignition.

The cylinders in groups of three were castings with water-jacket spaces around the cylinders and around the valve seats and partly surrounding the valve stem guides. The jacket heads were built into the water heater or return pipe to the radiator as one piece and in the head of the combustion chamber was a 2 3/8-inch threaded plug which when removed gave access to the entire combustion chamber for carbon removal without removing the cylinder castings. The water entered each cylinder group's rear face, which was the hottest section.The cylinder had a bore of 4 inches and stroke of 5.5 inches which gave an S.A.E. rating of 38.4 horsepower, a piston displacement of 414.7 cubic inches, and a stroke-bore ratio of 1.333 to 1.

The 24 was part of a trend toward long-stroke engines with smaller piston displacements, which provided more economy and more horsepower per unit of piston displacement. In addition, the connecting rods, which were produced of nickel steel instead of open hearth in 1913, were 40 percent lighter and had a narrower section.

Even though the pistons were longer than the previous year's model, which was necessary by the longer strokes employed, they were lighter. In addition, they were higher-quality castings with four-section rings. Each slot had a complete outside ring, but inside it was a sequence of arc-shaped segments creating an inner ring. Each segment was forced externally by a small leaf spring, which was employed to keep the outer ring from pressing against the cylinder wall unevenly. The constant pressure obtained by this construction of piston ring results in good compression being maintained for a longer period than was possible with the older type. The 40 percent carbon crankshaft had curved cheeks that helped to move the weight into the middle of the shaft axis and provide optimum rotational balance. Three bronze plain bearings supported the shaft with a babbitt alloy liner.

Intake and exhaust valves were made of tungsten steel, which was also used in racing automobiles, helped prevent pitting. Both valve sets have a 7/16-inch lift and 85-pound pressure springs and are 2 1/8 inches in diameter. A new oiling system used a gear pump in the crankcase sump that fed oil to a large-diameter pipe that went from end to end and within the crankcase. Three branches led to the crankshaft bearings from this conduit.

Instead of flowing into the sump, the overflow oil from these bearings was sent out the opposite end of the bearing, where it entered through a short pipe and dropped into little trays integral with the sides of the crankcase base, where it flowed into the oil troughs beneath the connecting rods. The scoops on the connecting rods dipped into these troughs. The final overflow from the troughs was recirculated in the sump. On the left side of the crankcase, in the web between the front and rear legs, an upgraded form of accessible oil strainer was installed. Timing gears were oiled directly from the front bearing's overflow via a short pipe that poured the oil onto the crankshaft's pinion.

==== Clutch Oiled from Motor ====
The multiple-disk clutch was improved by inserting cork inserts in one set of disks and operating the entire clutch in oil. A torque rod upgrade supported the clutch at the forward end by a curved leaf vanadium steel spring, saving 25 pounds in weight over the previous model.

==== Chassis ====
The model 24 chassis came with a single wheelbase length and seven interchangeable body designs, all of which were held in place by eight small stamped brackets on the outside of the frame side members, four on each side. This mounting was created to decrease body squeaks and to make demounting easier. The steering components on the front axle had a twofold tilt. The knuckle pins pointed slightly outward and there was a backward inclination of 1.5 to 2 degrees. The frame was 1/16 inch thicker and heavier than before. The side members were lowered in front of the back axle but not inswept at the dash. The front springs were 39 inches long with 2-inch leaves. The three-quarter rears were put beneath the axle not because it provided lower body suspension, but because it provided approximately double the spring movement radius. The top leaf was 52 inches long with 2 /14-inch leaves and was made of vanadium steel.

==== Chalmers-Entz Starting System ====
The Chalmers-Entz combination electric motor and generator was introduced in the Model 24 to crank the gasoline engine while also charging the storage battery. Instead of being mounted alongside the motor, the motor-generator was housed under the right front seat and was powered by a short propeller shaft that extended forward to the near rim of the flywheel and carried a small sprocket that was driven by a silent chain from a large sprocket on the flywheel. The generator was made in the Chalmers factory and was an 18-volt system. The complete unit was about 230 pounds in weight, 100 pounds for the motor-generator, 100 pounds for the battery, and 30 for the driving parts and attaching brackets.

==== Body ====
As it converged into the cowl, the hood was expanded and heightened. The hood transition into the body was made easier by turning off the dash lights and replacing them with a combination headlight that featured two bulbs, one for headlights and the other for dash lights, located above the lens exits.

==== Price and options ====
The roadster, four and five-passenger bodies were priced at $2,175, the six-passenger at $2,275, the coupe at $2,850, and the limousine at $3,680. In addition, $80 was fitted with McCue wire wheels. A $75 package that featured a Kellog tire pump, an extra rim casing, tube, and tire cover was also available. Mohair top, rain vision windshield, demountable rims, speedometer, rear tire carrier with spare rim, electric horn, electric starter, and electric lighting were all on the normal list. Brewster green, grey, and meteor blue were the standard colors for open cars. Closed automobiles were only available in the color valentine coach blue.

=== Model 26 ===
The Model 26-A came with a smaller engine and better performance being a lighter car.

Model	Production Years	Advertised H.P.	SAE HP	Cyl	Bore (in)	Stroke (in)	Tire Size (in)	Wheel Base (in)	Code Letter	Serial Number Range
12	1912–?	54	43.3	6	4.25	5.25	36x4.25	130	S	24001–24300
18	1913–?	54	43.8	6	4.25	5.25	36x4.5	130	R	25301–27000 29200–29499 33500–34499
24	1914–?	60	38.4	6	4	5.5	36x4.5	132	V	34500–38499
26-A	1914–?	48	29.4	6	3.5	5.5	34x4	126	WA	38600–41599
26-B	1915–?	45	29	6	3.5	4.5 or 5.5	34x4.25	125.5	W.B.	41701–44999
26-C	?	48	29.4	6	3.5	5.5	34x4.5	126	W.C.	45000–45799
29	1915–?	60	38.4	6	4	5.5	34x4.5	132	V.B.	45801–47300

=== Model 32 "Six-40" ===
The Model 32-A "Six-40" was the company's first overhead camshaft engine.

The engine was a Weidely Motor Company with its overhead camshaft (OHC) design. When comparing these later OHC Chalmers power plants to the T head or L head engines of the pre-World War I period, their specifications cannot be ignored. The Chalmers' two-roller-bearing-crankshaft F-head engine of 1910 had been a surprising performer, with a streamlined intake manifold feeding the cylinders via extremely large intake valves located in the head. The exhaust side valves were in a pocket, leaving a lot of room in the cylinder head for the inlets. In 1915, Chalmers made a great step forward with the incorporation of a full-overhead-camshaft Weidley engine, which pioneered the idea of driving the overhead-camshaft from the middle of the crankshaft instead of from the front or the rear. The model 6-40 had a bore and stroke of 3.125 and 5 inches, respectively, and camshaft rigidity was obtained by using a 2.25-inch diameter. The location of the camshaft drive in the center made it necessary to have four main bearings instead of the usual three. Tubular connecting rods were also used, which was a very advanced idea for its day.

=== "Six-30"/ "Y" ===
The "Six-30" consisted of Models 35-A ("5-15" for 5 passenger and 115-inch wheelbase), 35-B (or "7-22" for 7-passenger body and 122-inch wheelbase), 35-C, and 35-D. The car's balanced crankshaft and a new Morse silent timing chain gave it a reputation for a quiet and smooth ride. Later designs introduced a lower silhouette, one-piece windshield, and even disc wheels.

To overcome the poor fuel available at the time, the "Hot Spot" and "Ram's Horn" were introduced in 1918 to improve engine performance. The "Six-30" came in a wide variety of body styles and wheelbases to seat between 2 and 7 passengers.

Model	Production Years	Advertised H.P.	SAE HP	Cyl	Bore (in)	Stroke (in)	Tire Size (in)	Wheel Base (in)
32-A	1915–?	40	23.4	6	3 1/8	5	34x4	120
32-B	1916–?	40	23.4	6	3 1/8	5	34x4	124
35-A	1916–?	30	25.4	6	3 1/4	4 1/2	32x4	115
35-B Standard	1917	30	25.4	6	3 1/4	4 1/2	34x4 33x4 1/2	122
35-B Special	1918–?	30	25.4	6	3 1/4	4 1/2	34x4 33x4 1/2	122
35-C Special	mid-1917	30	25.4	6	3 1/4	4 1/2	32x4	117
35-C Standard	1918–?	30	25.4	6	3 1/4	4 1/2	32x4	117
35-D Special	?	30	25.4	6	3 1/4	4 1/2	33x4 1/2	122
35-D Standard	1918–?	30	25.4	6	3 1/4	4 1/2	33x4 1/2	122
35-C Speedster	1917	30	55	6	3 1/4	4 1/2	32x4	117
35-C	1920–22	30	55	6	3 1/4	4 1/2	32x4	117
35-B	1922	30	55	6	3 1/4	4 1/2	33x4 1/2	122
Y	1923	30	55	6	3 1/4	4 1/2	32x4	122/117

==== "Hot Spot" and "Ram's Horn" innovation ====
Chalmers introduced two mechanical devices in 1917 to overcome lower gasoline volatility. The "Hot Spot" and "Ram's Horn" warmed up the air-fuel mixture.

==== Four wheel brakes ====
In late 1923 customers could purchase the Model Y with an optional hydraulic four-wheel brake system for $75 based on hydraulics that had been initially developed for Lockheed.

==== Lucile Sedan ====
The couturière, costumier, journalist, and pundit, Lucy Duff-Gordon lent her name to advertising for brassieres, perfume, shoes, and other luxury apparel and beauty items. In 1916 she signed a contract to design interiors for limousines and town cars for the 1917 Chalmers Model 35-B. The design was an attempt to improve sales by marketing a more luxurious design. The Town car had no protection for the driver and the sedan had removable door posts to create a look of an open hard top. Duff-Gordon had little other interest in the exterior and focused on improved interior materials such as a mahogany dash and finer cloth.

== Racing ==
Chalmers marketed the company's visibility by hiring professional drivers and entering races. In the first two years, they won 89 first place wins, 32-second-place trophies, 21 third-place victories in road races, and hill-climbing events, and reliability contests. The best known as the Vanderbilt Cup in 1909 and the Glidden Trophy in 1910.

The Chalmers "30" won more motoring contests in proportion to the number entered than any other car regardless of price. It was never defeated in any race by any car in the same power and price class. The Chalmers won 89 firsts, 32 seconds, and 21 thirds in two years of races.

A Chalmers won the 1909 and 1910 Glidden Tour. Other wins included the Vanderbilt Cup Races (1909), Crown Point Races, Candler Trophy Races, and Pikes Peak hill climb.

=== Chalmers racing records ===
1909 Indiana Trophy Race Chalmers "30" was first, winning the Indiana Trophy on the Crown Point-Lowell circuit-232.74 miles at an average time of 51.5 miles per hour.

Santa Monica, California Chalmers "30" won first in 200-mile race, averaging 55.5 miles per hour. National Light Stock Car Event Chalmers "30" won first place and the Merrimac Valley trophy in Lowell, Massachusetts-127.2 miles at an average time of 52 miles per hour. Atlanta Georgia Speedway In November 1909, two Chalmers "30s" won every event in their class. Both cars averaged a mile for every minute they were on track during the week of racing. They won first and second place and the Candler trophy in a 100-mile race. For the week. the Chalmers' tally was five firsts, 11 seconds, and eight-thirds-the best average showing made.

1909 Vanderbilt Race

Chalmers "30" won first in the race for Massapequa trophy-126 miles in 129 minutes without a single stop. This is the world's speed record for cars of this type and has not been beaten since.

Denver-Mexico City In May 1909, a Chalmers "30" made the trip a pathfinder for the "Flag to Flag" tour. This was the first car to make the trip on its power from the Rio Grande to Mexico City, running 2400 miles in 24 running days. At the Fairmount Park, Philadelphia, a Chalmers "Forty" defeated one 90 horsepower, four 70 horsepower, and seven 60 horsepower cars. It was bested by only one car, a 90 horsepower of more than twice the price, and only four minutes. The "Forty" was awarded the Consistency Prize because it did not stop a single time during the 200-mile race.

A Chalmers won the Portland Rose Festival Race Wemme trophy and first place by a Chalmers "Forty" running 103 miles in 104 minutes.

A Chalmers won the Minneapolis Tribune Trophy in 1908, 1909 and 1910.

Chalmers produced six 1917 cars for racing. The engine had 55 horsepower, revved to 2600 rpm.

== Chalmers Award (1911–1914) ==
Before the 1910 season, Hugh Chalmers announced he would present a Chalmers Model 30 automobile to the player with the highest batting average in Major League Baseball at the end of the season.

The 1910 race for best average in the American League was between the Detroit Tigers' Ty Cobb and Nap Lajoie of the Cleveland Indians. Cobb had a .004 lead on Nap Lajoie for the American League batting title. Cobb won the title and the car. American League President Ban Johnson said a recalculation showed that Cobb had won the race but Chalmers ended up awarding cars to both players. Cobb enjoyed driving the car so much that he later requested a more streamlined racing vehicle from the company. Cobb was once assaulted by a gang of thieves in the streets of Detroit while riding in the Chalmers automobile. The approximate price of the car was around $1,500, and it was powered by an Inline 4 engine that produced 30 horsepower, featuring a 3-speed manual transmission

In 1911, Chalmers created the Chalmers Award. A committee of baseball writers was to convene after the season to determine the "most important and useful player to the club and the league". Since the award was not as effective at advertising as Chalmers had hoped, it was discontinued after 1914.

== External sources ==
- 1915 Chalmers Model 32B video
- 1914 Chalmers video
- 1910 Chalmers in Fairbank museum video
