= 1909 Washington Senators season =

1909 Washington Senators
- League: American League
- Ballpark: National Park
- City: Washington, D.C.
- Record: 42–110 (.276)
- League place: 8th
- Owners: Thomas C. Noyes
- Managers: Joe Cantillon

The 1909 Washington Senators, a professional baseball team, won 42 games, lost 110, and finished in eighth place in the American League. They were managed by Joe Cantillon and played home games at National Park. The Senators still hold the Major League record for the most games lost in one month of a season, with 29 losses (and only 5 wins) in July.

== Regular season ==
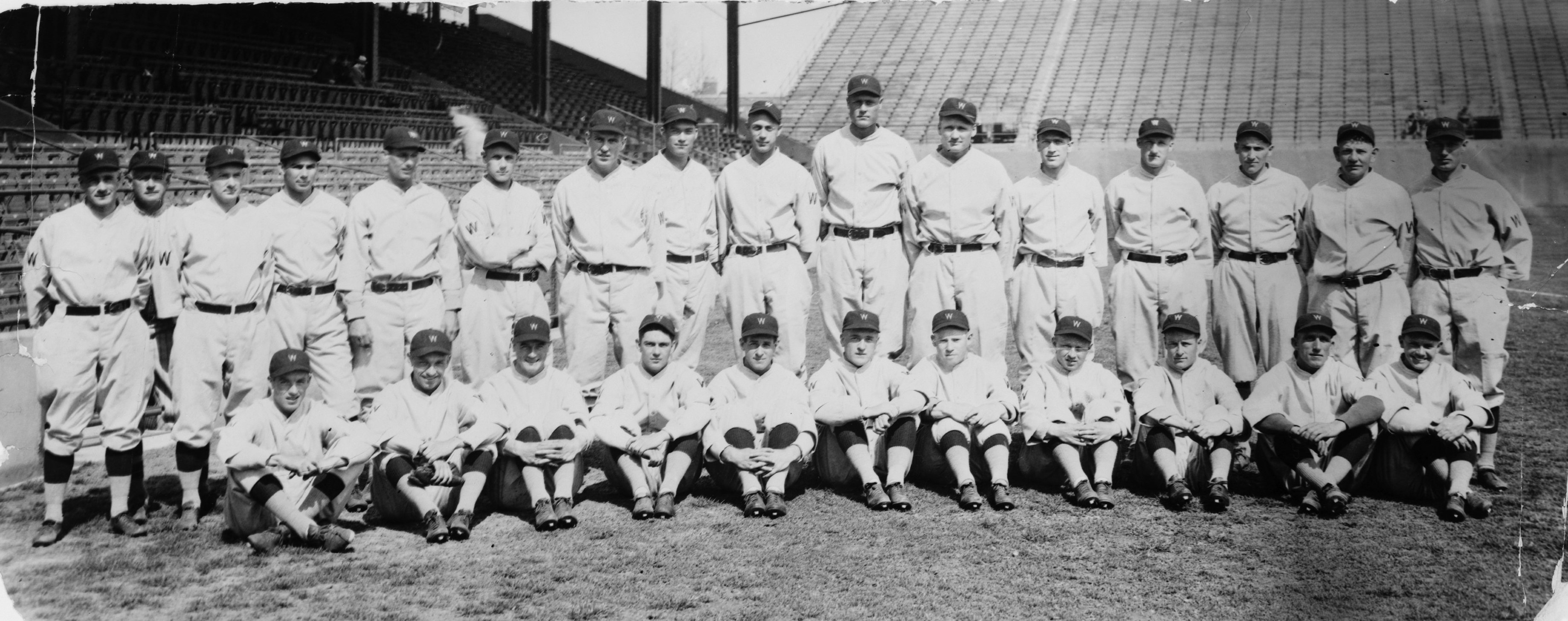
The 1909 Washington Senators team.

=== Season standings ===
American League
| Team | W | L | Pct. | GB | Home | Road |
|---|---|---|---|---|---|---|
| Detroit Tigers | 98 | 54 | .645 | — | 57‍–‍19 | 41‍–‍35 |
| Philadelphia Athletics | 95 | 58 | .621 | 3½ | 49‍–‍27 | 46‍–‍31 |
| Boston Red Sox | 88 | 63 | .583 | 9½ | 47‍–‍28 | 41‍–‍35 |
| Chicago White Sox | 78 | 74 | .513 | 20 | 42‍–‍34 | 36‍–‍40 |
| New York Highlanders | 74 | 77 | .490 | 23½ | 41‍–‍35 | 33‍–‍42 |
| Cleveland Naps | 71 | 82 | .464 | 27½ | 39‍–‍37 | 32‍–‍45 |
| St. Louis Browns | 61 | 89 | .407 | 36 | 40‍–‍37 | 21‍–‍52 |
| Washington Senators | 42 | 110 | .276 | 56 | 27‍–‍48 | 15‍–‍62 |

=== Record vs. opponents ===
1909 American League record Sources:
| Team | BOS | CWS | CLE | DET | NYH | PHA | SLB | WSH |
|---|---|---|---|---|---|---|---|---|
| Boston | — | 13–9–1 | 14–8 | 9–13 | 13–9 | 10–11 | 13–7 | 16–6 |
| Chicago | 9–13–1 | — | 8–13–1 | 6–15–2 | 14–8–1 | 12–10 | 10–12–1 | 19–3–1 |
| Cleveland | 8–14 | 13–8–1 | — | 8–14–1 | 8–14 | 9–13 | 14–8 | 11–11 |
| Detroit | 13–9 | 15–6–2 | 14–8–1 | — | 14–8 | 8–14 | 18–3–1 | 16–6–2 |
| New York | 9–13 | 8–14–1 | 14–8 | 8–14 | — | 8–14 | 13–8–1 | 14–6 |
| Philadelphia | 11–10 | 10–12 | 13–9 | 14–8 | 14–8 | — | 14–8 | 19–3 |
| St. Louis | 7–13 | 12–10–1 | 8–14 | 3–18–1 | 8–13–1 | 8–14 | — | 15–7–1 |
| Washington | 6–16 | 3–19–1 | 11–11 | 6–16–2 | 6–14 | 3–19 | 7–15–1 | — |

=== Roster ===
1909 Washington Senators
Roster
| Pitchers: Nick Altrock; Bill Burns; Bill Forman; Dolly Gray; Bob Groom; Joe Hovlik; Tom Hughes; Walter Johnson; Burt Keeley; Frank Oberlin; Joe Ohl; Doc Reisling; Charlie Smith; Dixie Walker; Roy Witherup | Catchers: Cliff Blankenship; Jack Hardy; Mike Kahoe; Gabby Street; Infielders: Wid Conroy; Tom Crooke; Jim Delahanty; Jiggs Donahue; Jerry Freeman; Speed Kelly; George McBride; Germany Schaefer; Bill Shipke; Jack Slattery; Bob Unglaub; Bill Yohe | Outfielders: George Browne; Otis Clymer; Orth Collins; Gavvy Cravath; Bob Ganley; Doc Gessler; Frank Hemphill; Red Killefer; Jack Lelivelt; Clyde Milan; Warren Miller; Jimmy Sebring; Jesse Tannehill | Manager: Joe Cantillon |

== Player stats ==
=== Batting ===
==== Starters by position ====
Note: Pos = Position; G = Games played; AB = At bats; H = Hits; Avg. = Batting average; HR = Home runs; RBI = Runs batted in

| Pos | Player | G | AB | H | Avg. | HR | RBI |
|---|---|---|---|---|---|---|---|
| C | Gabby Street | 137 | 407 | 86 | .211 | 0 | 29 |
| 1B | Jiggs Donahue | 84 | 283 | 67 | .237 | 0 | 28 |
| 2B | Jim Delahanty | 90 | 302 | 67 | .222 | 1 | 21 |
| SS | George McBride | 156 | 504 | 118 | .234 | 0 | 34 |
| 3B | Wid Conroy | 139 | 488 | 119 | .244 | 1 | 20 |
| OF | Clyde Milan | 130 | 400 | 80 | .200 | 1 | 15 |
| OF | George Browne | 103 | 393 | 107 | .272 | 1 | 16 |
| OF | Jack Lelivelt | 91 | 318 | 93 | .292 | 0 | 24 |

==== Other batters ====
Note: G = Games played; AB = At bats; H = Hits; Avg. = Batting average; HR = Home runs; RBI = Runs batted in

| Player | G | AB | H | Avg. | HR | RBI |
|---|---|---|---|---|---|---|
| Bob Unglaub | 130 | 480 | 127 | .265 | 3 | 41 |
| Otis Clymer | 45 | 138 | 27 | .196 | 0 | 6 |
| Germany Schaefer | 37 | 128 | 31 | .242 | 1 | 4 |
| Red Killefer | 40 | 121 | 21 | .174 | 0 | 5 |
| Bill Yohe | 21 | 72 | 15 | .208 | 0 | 4 |
| Bob Ganley | 19 | 63 | 16 | .254 | 0 | 5 |
| Cliff Blankenship | 39 | 60 | 15 | .250 | 0 | 9 |
| Jack Slattery | 32 | 56 | 12 | .214 | 0 | 6 |
| Doc Gessler | 17 | 54 | 13 | .241 | 0 | 8 |
| Warren Miller | 26 | 51 | 11 | .216 | 0 | 1 |
| Jerry Freeman | 19 | 48 | 8 | .167 | 0 | 3 |
| Speed Kelly | 17 | 42 | 6 | .143 | 0 | 1 |
| Jesse Tannehill | 16 | 36 | 6 | .167 | 0 | 1 |
| Jack Hardy | 10 | 24 | 4 | .167 | 0 | 4 |
| Bill Shipke | 9 | 16 | 2 | .125 | 0 | 0 |
| Mike Kahoe | 4 | 8 | 1 | .125 | 0 | 0 |
| Tom Crooke | 3 | 7 | 2 | .286 | 0 | 2 |
| Orth Collins | 8 | 7 | 0 | .000 | 0 | 0 |
| Gavvy Cravath | 4 | 6 | 0 | .000 | 0 | 1 |
| Frank Hemphill | 1 | 3 | 0 | .000 | 0 | 0 |
| Jimmy Sebring | 1 | 0 | 0 | ---- | 0 | 0 |

=== Pitching ===
==== Starting pitchers ====
Note: G = Games pitched; IP = Innings pitched; W = Wins; L = Losses; ERA = Earned run average; SO = Strikeouts

| Player | G | IP | W | L | ERA | SO |
|---|---|---|---|---|---|---|
| Walter Johnson | 40 | 296.1 | 13 | 25 | 2.22 | 164 |
| Bob Groom | 44 | 260.2 | 7 | 26 | 2.87 | 131 |
| Dolly Gray | 36 | 218.0 | 5 | 19 | 3.59 | 87 |
| Charlie Smith | 23 | 145.2 | 3 | 12 | 3.27 | 72 |
| Dixie Walker | 4 | 36.0 | 3 | 1 | 2.50 | 25 |
| Bill Forman | 2 | 11.0 | 0 | 2 | 4.91 | 2 |

==== Other pitchers ====
Note: G = Games pitched; IP = Innings pitched; W = Wins; L = Losses; ERA = Earned run average; SO = Strikeouts

| Player | G | IP | W | L | ERA | SO |
|---|---|---|---|---|---|---|
| Tom Hughes | 22 | 120.1 | 4 | 7 | 2.69 | 77 |
| Roy Witherup | 12 | 68.0 | 1 | 5 | 4.24 | 26 |
| Doc Reisling | 10 | 66.2 | 2 | 4 | 2.43 | 22 |
| Frank Oberlin | 9 | 41.0 | 1 | 4 | 3.73 | 13 |
| Nick Altrock | 9 | 38.0 | 1 | 3 | 5.45 | 9 |
| Bill Burns | 6 | 29.1 | 1 | 1 | 1.23 | 13 |
| Jesse Tannehill | 3 | 21.0 | 1 | 1 | 3.43 | 8 |

==== Relief pitchers ====
Note: G = Games pitched; W = Wins; L = Losses; SV = Saves; ERA = Earned run average; SO = Strikeouts

| Player | G | W | L | SV | ERA | SO |
|---|---|---|---|---|---|---|
| Joe Ohl | 4 | 0 | 0 | 0 | 2.08 | 2 |
| Joe Hovlik | 3 | 0 | 0 | 0 | 4.50 | 1 |
| Burt Keeley | 2 | 0 | 0 | 0 | 11.57 | 0 |
| Orth Collins | 1 | 0 | 0 | 0 | 0.00 | 1 |

== See also ==
- List of worst Major League Baseball season records
