= 1910 Washington Senators season =

1910 Washington Senators
- League: American League
- Ballpark: National Park
- City: Washington, D.C.
- Record: 66–85 (.437)
- League place: 7th
- Owners: Thomas C. Noyes
- Managers: Jimmy McAleer

The 1910 Washington Senators won 66 games, lost 85, and finished in seventh place in the American League. They were managed by Jimmy McAleer and played home games at National Park.

== Regular season ==
=== Season standings ===
American League
Team	W	L	Pct.	GB	Home	Road
Philadelphia Athletics	102	48	.680	—	57‍–‍19	45‍–‍29
New York Highlanders	88	63	.583	14½	49‍–‍25	39‍–‍38
Detroit Tigers	86	68	.558	18	46‍–‍31	40‍–‍37
Boston Red Sox	81	72	.529	22½	51‍–‍28	30‍–‍44
Cleveland Naps	71	81	.467	32	39‍–‍36	32‍–‍45
Chicago White Sox	68	85	.444	35½	41‍–‍37	27‍–‍48
Washington Senators	66	85	.437	36½	38‍–‍35	28‍–‍50
St. Louis Browns	47	107	.305	57	26‍–‍51	21‍–‍56

=== Record vs. opponents ===
1910 American League record Sources:
Team	BOS	CWS	CLE	DET	NYH	PHA	SLB	WSH
Boston	—	10–12	14–8–3	12–10	9–13–1	4–18	16–6	16–5–1
Chicago	12–10	—	10–12	9–13	8–13–2	8–14–1	12–10	9–13
Cleveland	8–14–3	12–10	—	9–13	8–13	7–14–4	18–4–1	9–13–1
Detroit	10–12	13–9	13–9	—	13–9	9–13	15–7	13–9–1
New York	13–9–1	13–8–2	13–8	9–13	—	9–12	16–6–1	15–7–1
Philadelphia	18–4	14–8–1	14–7–4	13–9	12–9	—	17–5	14–6
St. Louis	6–16	10–12	4–18–1	7–15	6–16–1	5–17	—	9–13–2
Washington	5–16–1	13–9	13–9–1	9–13–1	7–15–1	6–14	13–9–2	—

=== Roster ===
1910 Washington Senators
Roster
Pitchers: Bill Forman; Dolly Gray; Bob Groom; Dutch Hinrichs; Joe Hovlik; Walter Johnson; Ed Moyer; Frank Oberlin; Bill Otey; Doc Reisling; Dixie Walker	Catchers: Eddie Ainsmith; Heinie Beckendorf; Jack Hardy; John Henry; Gabby Street; Infielders: Wid Conroy; Tom Crooke; Bill Cunningham; Kid Elberfeld; Red Killefer; George McBride; Germany Schaefer; Jock Somerlott; Bob Unglaub	Outfielders: George Browne; Doc Gessler; Jack Lelivelt; Clyde Milan; Doc Ralston	Manager: Jimmy McAleer

== Game log ==
Legend
Twins Win	Twins Loss	Game postponed

1910 Game Log
March/April: 0–0 (Home: 0–0, Road: 0–0)

#	Date	Opponent	Score	Win	Loss	Save	Attendance	Record
1	April 14	Athletics	3–0					
2	April 15	Athletics	2–8					
3	April 16	@ Athletics	4–3					
4	April 19	@ Red Sox	1–2					
5	April 19	@ Red Sox	4–5					
6	April 20	@ Red Sox	12–4					
7	April 21	@ Red Sox	3–10					
8	April 22	Highlanders	1–3					
9	April 23	Highlanders	0–0					
10	April 25	Highlanders	2–5					
11	April 26	Highlanders	9–7					
12	April 27	Red Sox	1–11					
13	April 29	Red Sox	2–1					
13	April 30	Red Sox	3–9					

== Player stats ==
=== Batting ===
==== Starters by position ====
Note: Pos = Position; G = Games played; AB = At bats; H = Hits; Avg. = Batting average; HR = Home runs; RBI = Runs batted in

Pos	Player	G	AB	H	Avg.	HR	RBI
C	Gabby Street	89	257	52	.202	1	16
1B	Bob Unglaub	124	431	101	.234	0	44
2B	Red Killefer	106	345	79	.229	0	24
SS	George McBride	154	514	118	.230	1	55
3B	Kid Elberfeld	127	455	114	.251	2	42
OF	Doc Gessler	145	487	126	.259	2	50
OF	Clyde Milan	142	531	148	.279	0	16
OF	Jack Lelivelt	110	347	92	.265	0	33

==== Other batters ====
Note: G = Games played; AB = At bats; H = Hits; Avg. = Batting average; HR = Home runs; RBI = Runs batted in

Player	G	AB	H	Avg.	HR	RBI
Wid Conroy	103	351	89	.254	1	27
Germany Schaefer	74	229	63	.275	0	14
Eddie Ainsmith	33	104	20	.192	0	9
Heinie Beckendorf	37	103	15	.146	0	10
John Henry	28	87	13	.149	0	5
Bill Cunningham	21	74	22	.297	0	14
Doc Ralston	21	73	15	.205	0	3
Jock Somerlott	16	63	14	.222	0	2
George Browne	7	22	4	.182	0	0
Tom Crooke	8	21	4	.190	0	1
Jack Hardy	7	8	2	.250	0	0

=== Pitching ===
==== Starting pitchers ====
Note: G = Games pitched; IP = Innings pitched; W = Wins; L = Losses; ERA = Earned run average; SO = Strikeouts

Player	G	IP	W	L	ERA	SO
Walter Johnson	45	370.0	25	17	1.36	313
Bob Groom	34	257.2	12	17	2.76	98
Dolly Gray	34	229.0	8	19	2.63	84
Dixie Walker	29	199.1	11	11	3.30	84
Doc Reisling	30	191.0	10	10	2.54	57
Frank Oberlin	8	57.1	0	6	2.98	18

==== Other pitchers ====
Note: G = Games pitched; IP = Innings pitched; W = Wins; L = Losses; ERA = Earned run average; SO = Strikeouts

Player	G	IP	W	L	ERA	SO
Bill Otey	9	34.2	0	1	3.38	12
Ed Moyer	6	25.0	0	3	3.24	3

==== Relief pitchers ====
Note: G = Games pitched; W = Wins; L = Losses; SV = Saves; ERA = Earned run average; SO = Strikeouts

Player	G	W	L	SV	ERA	SO
Dutch Hinrichs	3	0	1	1	2.57	5
Joe Hovlik	1	0	0	0	16.20	0
Bill Forman	1	0	0	0	13.50	0
