= Fort Wayne Railroaders =

- 1901–1914; (1901, 1903–1906, 1908–1914); Fort Wayne, Indiana

Minor league affiliations
- Class: Class A (1901); Class B (1903–1905); Class C (1906); Class B (1908–1914)
- League: Western Association (1901); Central League (1903–1905); Interstate Association (1906); Central League (1908–1914)

Major league affiliations
- Team: None

Minor league titles
- League titles (4): 1903; 1905; 1906; 1912

Team data
- Name: Fort Wayne Railroaders (1901, 1903–1906); Fort Wayne Billikens (1908–1910); Fort Wayne Brakies (1911); Fort Wayne Railroaders (1912); Fort Wayne Champs (1913); Fort Wayne Railroaders (1914); Fort Wayne Cubs (1915)
- Ballpark: The Grand Dutchess (1901, 1903–1906, 1908–1914)

The Fort Wayne Railroaders were a minor league baseball team based in Fort Wayne, Indiana.

Between 1903 and 1915, Fort Wayne teams played primarily as members of the Class B level Central League, with single seasons in the 1901 Class A level Western Association and 1906 Class C level Interstate Association. The Fort Wayne Railroaders won league championships in 1903, 1905, 1906 and 1912. Besides the "Railroaders" nickname, Fort Wayne played under four nicknames in the Central League, as teams were known as the "Billikens" from 1908 to 1910, the "Brakies" in 1911, the "Champs" in 1914 and the "Cubs" in 1915.

Baseball Hall of Fame member Jesse Haines played for the 1914 Fort Wayne Railroaders, as his first professional team.

The Fort Wayne teams hosted all home minor league baseball home games at The Grand Dutchess.

== History ==
=== 1901 Western Association, beginnings ===
The first professional team based in Fort Wayne were the major league level Fort Wayne Kekiongas, which played the 1871 season as members of the National Association.

Minor league baseball began in Fort Wayne in 1883, when the Fort Wayne Hoosiers team played as members of the Independent level Northwestern League.

After beginning play in the 1896 Interstate League, the 1900 Fort Wayne Indians ended a five-year tenure in the Interstate League by winning the league championship. The Indians immediately preceded the Railroaders in minor league play. The Interstate League folded following the 1900 season, and Fort Wayne continued play in 1901 in a new league, known by a new nickname.

The Fort Wayne "Railroaders" continued minor league play in 1901, The Railroaders became members of the eight-team Class A level Western Association. Playing their first season in the new league, Fort Wayne placed fourth with a record of 73–67 and finished 12.0 games behind the first place Dayton Veterans. The Railroaders were managed by Fort Wayne's returning manager Doggie Miller, as no playoffs were held. Natty Nattress of Fort Wayne led the Western Association with 124 runs scored. The Western Association folded and did not return to play in 1902.

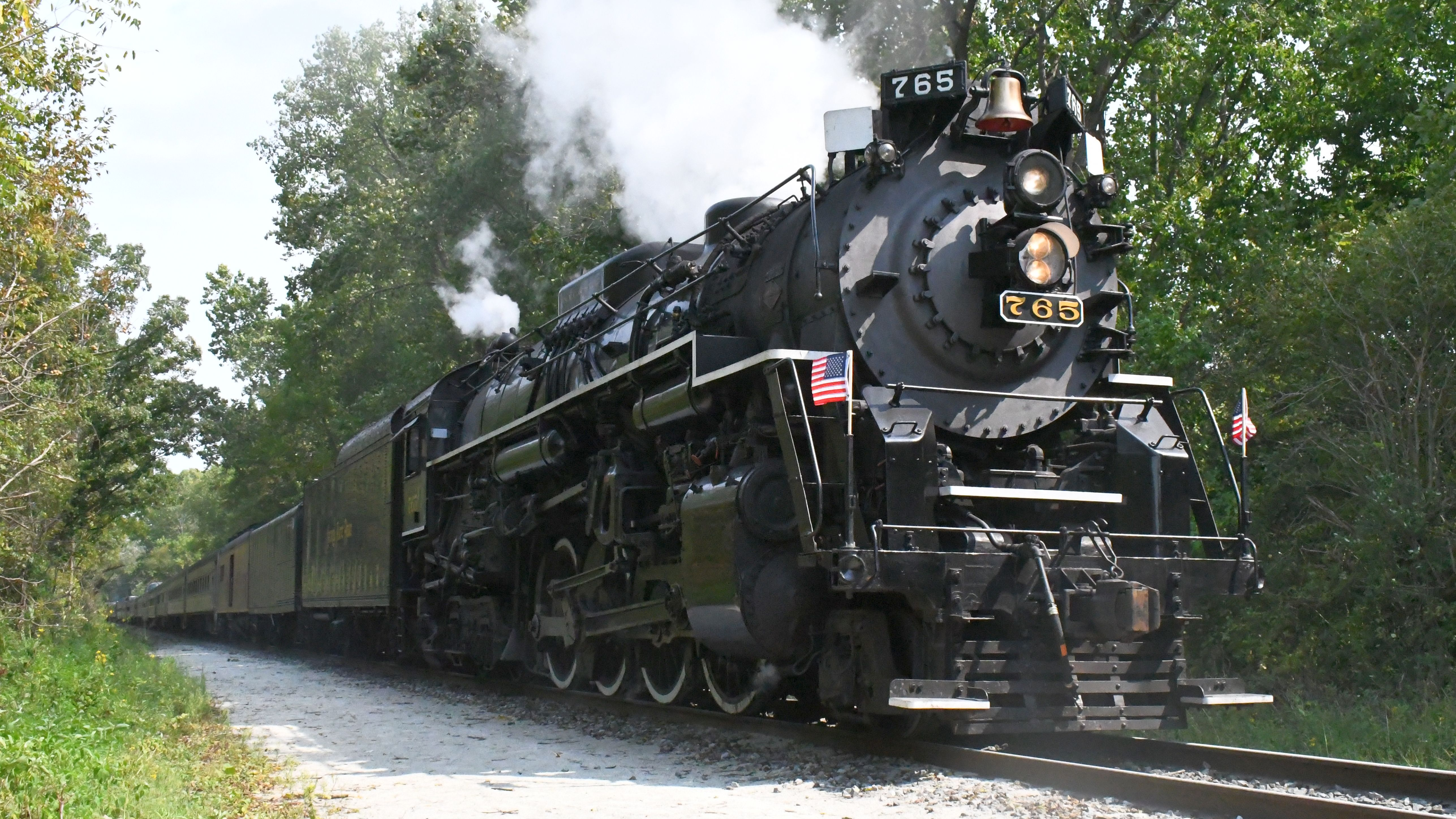
(2021) Nickel Plate Road 765 Steam Locomotive. Retired in 1958 and housed stationary at a park in Fort Wayne, the locomotive was restored by the Fort Wayne Railroad Historical Society. It is listed on the National Register of Historic Places.

The Fort Wayne "Railroaders" nickname corresponds to the railroad industry and history in the city and region. At the turn of the 20th century, the Northeast Indiana region containing Fort Wayne was a major industry center and subsequently local rail connected to every major city. Fort Wayne was a hub for passenger train service in the era. Today, the Fort Wayne Railroad Historical Society is in operation as a railroad preservation organization.

In 1973, the Nickel Plate Railroad's steam locomotive no. 765 was acquired by the society from the city of Fort Wayne, where it had been a static monument within Lawton Park for 12 years as a tribute to Fort Wayne's railroad history. The locomotive was retired from use in 1958, by the New York, Chicago, & St. Louis Railroad that served Fort Wayne. In 1974, wanting to repair the locomotive, the society built temporary tracks and moved the locomotive from Lawton Park through the city to the Nickel Plate Road's New Haven shops, now owned by the Fort Wayne Railroad Historical Society. In 1979, while undergoing restoration, the 765 ran under its own steam power for the first time since 1963. Today, the 765 has been fully restored and is in use on public excursions, having been added to the Norfolk Southern Railway's 21st Century Steam program in 2012. The 765 was added to the National Register of Historic Places in 1996.

The Fort Wayne station, also known as the Pennsylvania Railroad Station and Baker Street Station, was opened to the public for passenger service in 1914 and is still in use today. The station was listed on the National Register of Historic Places in 1998. It is located at 221 Baker Street

=== Central League 1903 to 1905 two championships ===
Without a minor league team in 1902, the Fort Wayne "Shamrocks" semiprofessional team played home games at League Park during the interim season, before minor league baseball returned to Fort Wayne in 1903.

In 1903, the Fort Wayne Railroaders resumed play in a newly formed league. Fort Wayne became members of the eight-team Class B level Central League and had immediate success. The Dayton Veterans, Evansville River Rats, Grand Rapids Orphans, Marion Oilworkers, South Bend Green Stockings, Terre Haute Hottentots, and Wheeling Stogies teams joined with Fort Wayne in 1903 league play.

The 1903 Fort Wayne Railroaders won the league championship of the Class B level Central League. With a record of 89–49, Fort Wayne finished 1.0 game ahead of the second place South Bend Greens, followed by the Anderson/Grand Rapids Orphans (48–92), Dayton Veterans (61–76) Evansville River Rats (64–68), Marion Oilworkers (71–65), Terre Haute Hottentots (58–80) and Wheeling Stogies (69–68) teams in the final standings. Manager Bade Myers led the Railroaders in their championship season.

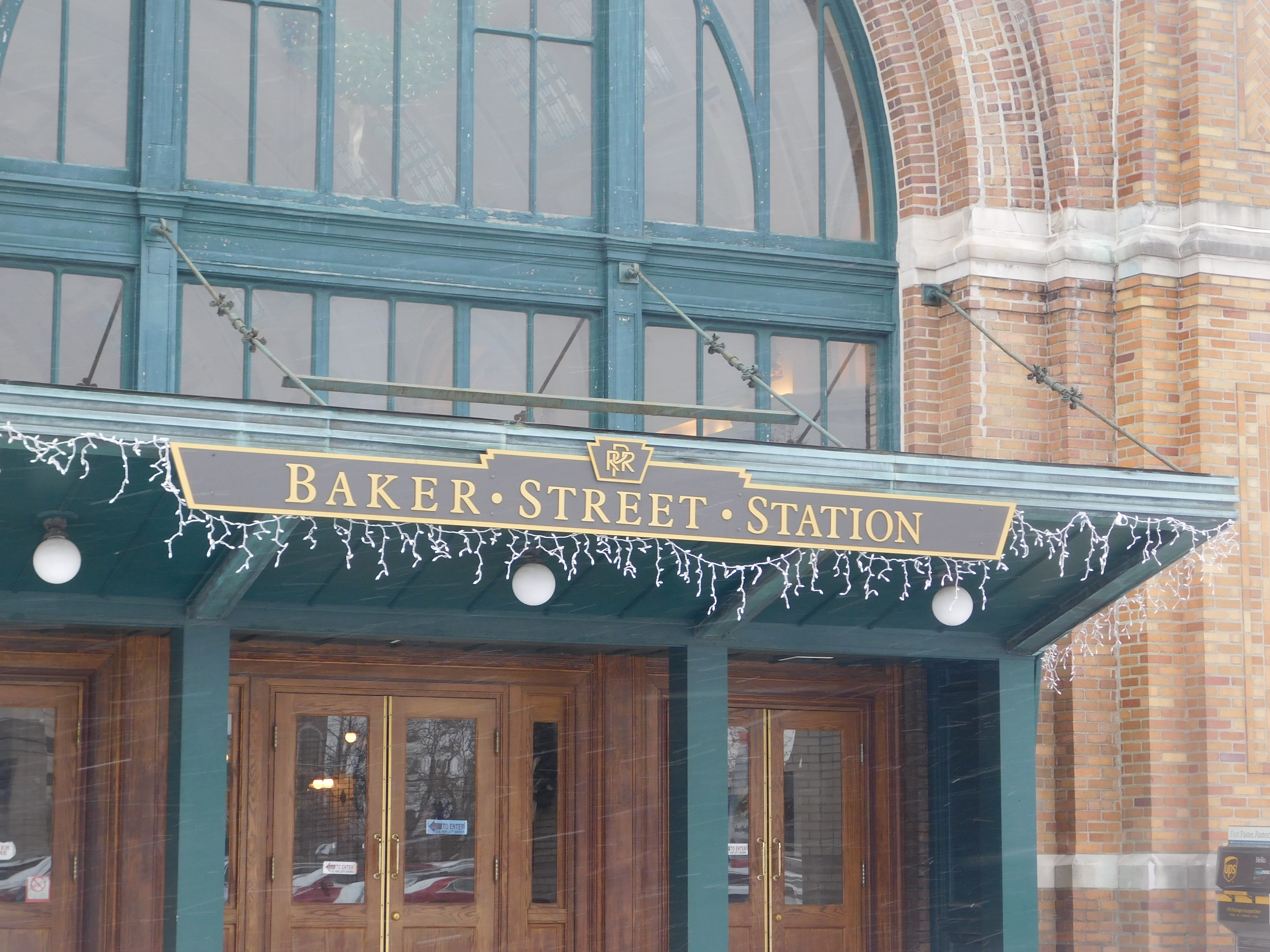
(2019) Pennsylvania Railroad Station. Fort Wayne, Indiana. Opened in 1914, the station is on the National Register of Historic Places.

The Fort Wayne Railroaders successfully defended their championship in the 1904 Central League, winning a second consecutive league title under manager Bade Myers. Fort Wayne again placed first in the league standings in 1904, as the Railroaders ended the season with a record of 87–51 in the eight-team Class B level Central League. Fort Wayne finished 10.5 games ahead on the second place Fort Wayne Hottentots in the final league standings. Bert Dennis of Fort Wayne led the Central league with 92 runs scored.

In 1905, the defending champion Fort Wayne Railroaders began the season continuing play in the eight-team Class B level Central League, before relocating during the season. On July 10, 1905, Fort Wayne had a record of 31–41 when the team moved to Canton, Ohio, finishing the season as the Canton Red Stockings. Managed by the returning Bade Myers and George Williams, the Red Stockings compiled a record of 25–35 while based in Canton. The Fort Wayne/Canton team placed seventh in the league with an overall record of 56–79 regular season record. Fort Wayne/Canton finished 24.5 games behind the first place Wheeling Stogies in the final standings.

=== Interstate League 1906 championship ===
After the team relocated during the 1905 season, the Fort Wayne Railroaders reformed in 1906, but did not return to the Central League. The Railroaders became charter members of the short-lived Class C level Interstate League, winning the league's championship in a shortened season.

The 1906 Interstate Association formed as an eight–team league that began play in April 1906. The league was organized with the Anderson, Indiana, Bay City, Flint Vehicles, Lima Lees, Marion Moguls, Muncie Fruit Jars and Saginaw teams joining Fort Wayne beginning the league schedule on April 26, 1906.

During the 1906 season, the Muncie and Bay City teams both disbanded on May 18. Saginaw moved to Marion, Ohio on June 21 before folding and Flint disbanded on July 2, 1906. The Interstate Association, with four remaining teams, permanently disbanded on July 8, 1906.

On July 8, 1906, the Fort Wayne Railroaders were in first place when the Interstate Association folded, giving the team a championship. Fort Wayne finished the shorted season with a final record of 37–22, playing under managers Louie Heilbroner and Jack Hardy during the season. Heilbroner had previously managed the 1900 St. Louis Cardinals and later became president of the Central League, serving in that role in 1912 and 1913. Fort Wayne was followed by the Marion (36–24), Anderson (30–31) and Lima (26–36) teams in the final Interstate Association league standings. The Interstate Association did not reform as a minor league in after folding in 1906, leaving Fort Wayne without a league membership in 1907.

=== Central League - 1908 to 1911 Fort Wayne Billikens/Brakies ===
After not hosting a minor league team during the 1907 season, Fort Wayne resumed minor league play in the 1908, returning to the Central League known by a new nickname. The Fort Wayne "Billikens" were formed, beginning another tenure in the league. In their first season of rejoining the Central League, the Billikens finished in third place in the final Central League standings. With a record of 75–65 under manager Jack Hendricks, Fort Wayne finished 9.0 games behind the first place Evansville River Rats and 3.0 games ahead of the third place Dayton Veterans.

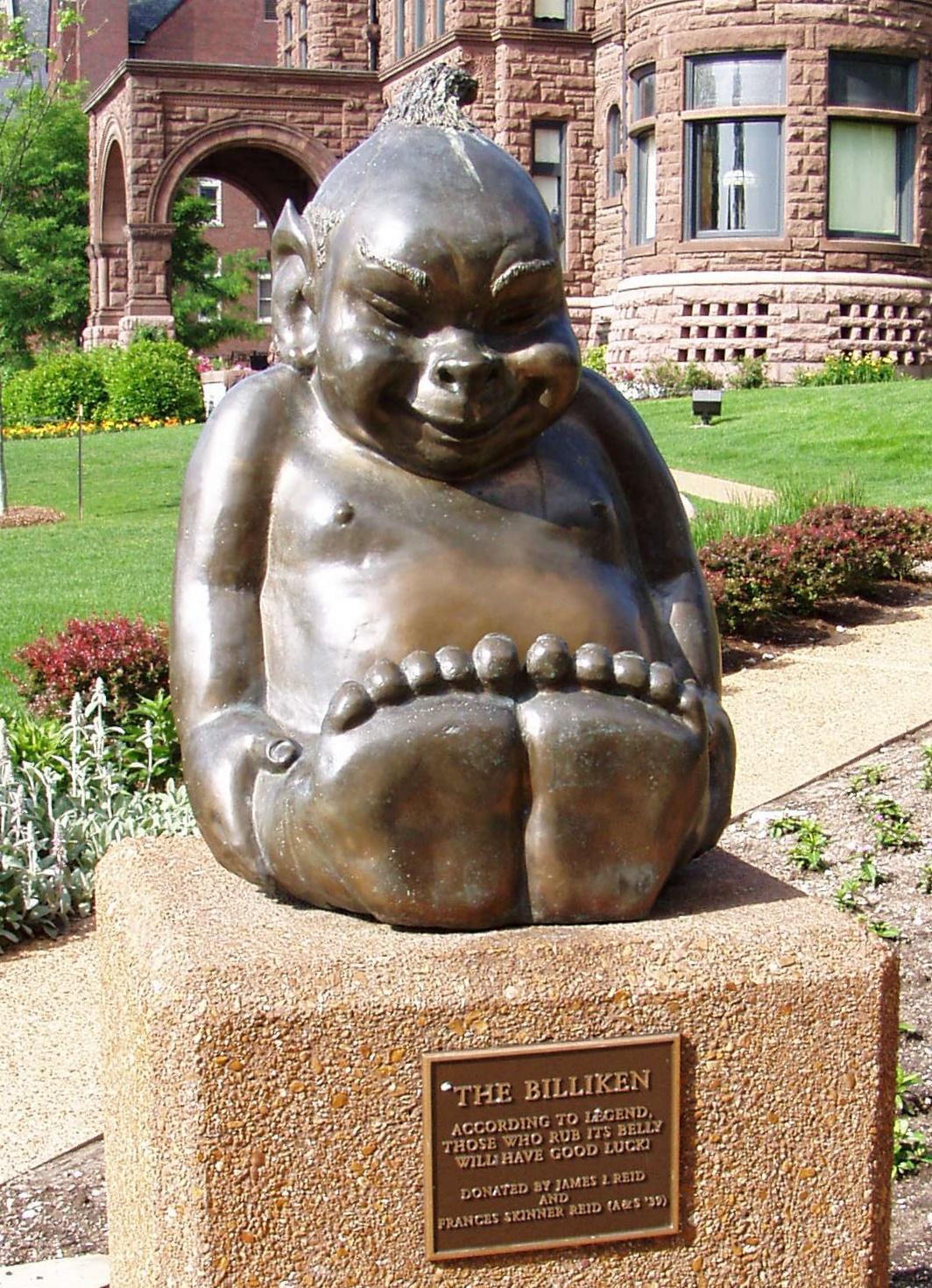
(2004) A Billiken statue at St. Louis University. St. Louis, Missouri.

A Billiken is a charm doll or figure said to give the possessor of the doll good luck. The figure was patented in 1908, and mass-produced after the patent. The Billiken is known as "The God of Things as They Ought to Be".

In the era, the "Billikens" was the team nickname for several minor league teams, including the Montgomery Billikens of the 1910 Southern Association, the Bay City Billikens of the 1911 and 1912 Southern Michigan League and the McLeansboro Billikens of the 1910 Kentucky–Illinois–Tennessee League.

The 1909 Fort Wayne Billikens placed third in the eight-team Central League, as Jack Hendricks returned to manage Fort Wayne. The Billikens ended the season with a final record of 77–66. Fort Wayne finished 14.0 games behind the league champion Wheeling Stooges. Billiken player Curley Blount led the Central League with 92 runs scored.

Fort Wayne manager Jack Hendricks later managed both the St. Louis Cardinals and Cincinnati Reds for seven total seasons in the major leagues. Hendricks held a law degree from Northwestern University Law School and was admitted to the bar in the state of Illinois. Hendricks is one of a select group of major league managers to hold a law degree or pass a state bar. The others include James Henry O'Rourke, Miller Huggins, Branch Rickey, John Montgomery Ward, Hughie Jennings, Muddy Ruel, and Tony La Russa.

In the 1910 season, the Fort Wayne Billikens continued play in the eight-team Central League and placed second in the final standings. The Billikens finished with a regular season record 79–58, playing the season under manager Jimmy Burke. Fort Wayne ended the season 8.5 games behind the first place South Bend Bronchos in the final league standings, as the league held no playoffs. Pitcher William Robertson of Fort Wayne had a 20–5 record to lead the Central Association.

The Fort Wayne team was known at the "Brakies" in the 1911 season, as the team finished as runner-up in the eight-team Central League.

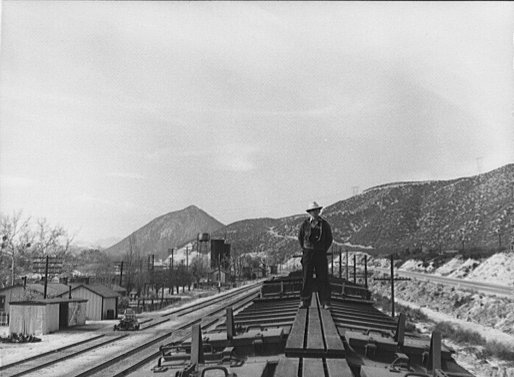
(1943) Santa Fe train stopped at Cajon Siding. The brakeman is standing atop the train during a stop to cool the train's braking equipment.

The Fort Wayne "Brakie" nickname corresponds with the city and region's railroad industry and history. A "Brakie" is a slang railroad team referring to the Brakemen position on the railroad crew operation. A "brakie" worker was a vital railroad position that installed, inspected, repaired and operated train brakes, among other duties.

The brakeman's responsibilities included providing flag protection from following trains for a stopped train, ensuring that the railway couplings between cars were properly set, aligning railroad switches, and signaling to the train operators while performing switching operations. The brakemen rode in the caboose, which was built specially to allow the brakie crew member to apply the brakes of the caboose quickly if necessary, which would help to slow the train. In the era, some local U.S. labor laws required that enough brakemen would be staffed on every train so that one brakeman would be responsible for no more than two cars. Brakemen duties were also to watch and inspect the train when it was underway, looking for signs of hot boxes, a dangerous overheating of axle bearings or for any damage to rolling stock, as well as for unauthorized people trying to ride on the train and displaced cargo.

The Brakies ended the 1911 Central League season as the league runner up with a record of 88–54, placing second in the Central League, while playing the season under manager Doc Casey. Fort Wayne ended the season 3.0 games behind the first place Dayton Veterans in the final standings.

=== Central League - 1912 to 1915 ===
The Class B Central League expanded by four teams in 1912, as Fort Wayne continued league play, again becoming known by the "Railroaders" nickname. The Akron Rubbermen, Canton Statesmen, Erie Sailors and Youngstown Steelmen teams joined the league increasing it to twelve teams, an uncommonly large league.

On the field, the Railroaders won the championship of the 12–team Central League, after the league had expanded. Fort Wayne ended the season with a record of 77–51, finishing 2.5 games ahead of the second place Youngstown Steelmen. Shag Shaughnessy managed the Railroaders to the title. The 12–team league held no playoffs.

After their championship the previous season, the 1913 team was known as the Fort Wayne "Champs." The Champs continued play in the 1913 Central League, as the Central League reduced from twelve teams to six teams and remained a Class B level league.

After a 7–6 loss in a 1913 game at Fort Wayne, the Terre Haute Terre-iers player/manager Goat Anderson protested the game. During the game, Terre Haute was winning 6–0 in the bottom of the 7th inning, which was the last inning as it was the first game of a double header. A ball was hit by a Fort Wayne batter to left field, where Anderson was playing. As he was running to field the ball, a loose Great Dane named "Don" ran at Anderson as he chased the base hit. With "Don" running and jumping at Anderson, this caused him to hesitate, and the batter ended up on third base with a triple on the play. Fort Wayne proceeded to score seven runs in the inning to win the game. Anderson filed a protest with the Central League, requesting that the entire game be played over. Central League president Louis Heilbroner denied Anderson's protest, reasoning that the play did not have a significant impact on the outcome of the game. Heilbroner ordered that Don no longer be allowed on the field during Fort Wayne home games.

Placing second in the final standings of the six-team 1913 Central League, the Champs had an overall record of 77–63, playing the season under manager Jimmy Burke. Fort Wayne finished 15.0 games behind the first place Grand Rapids Bill-eds (92–48) in the final standings. The league held no playoffs.

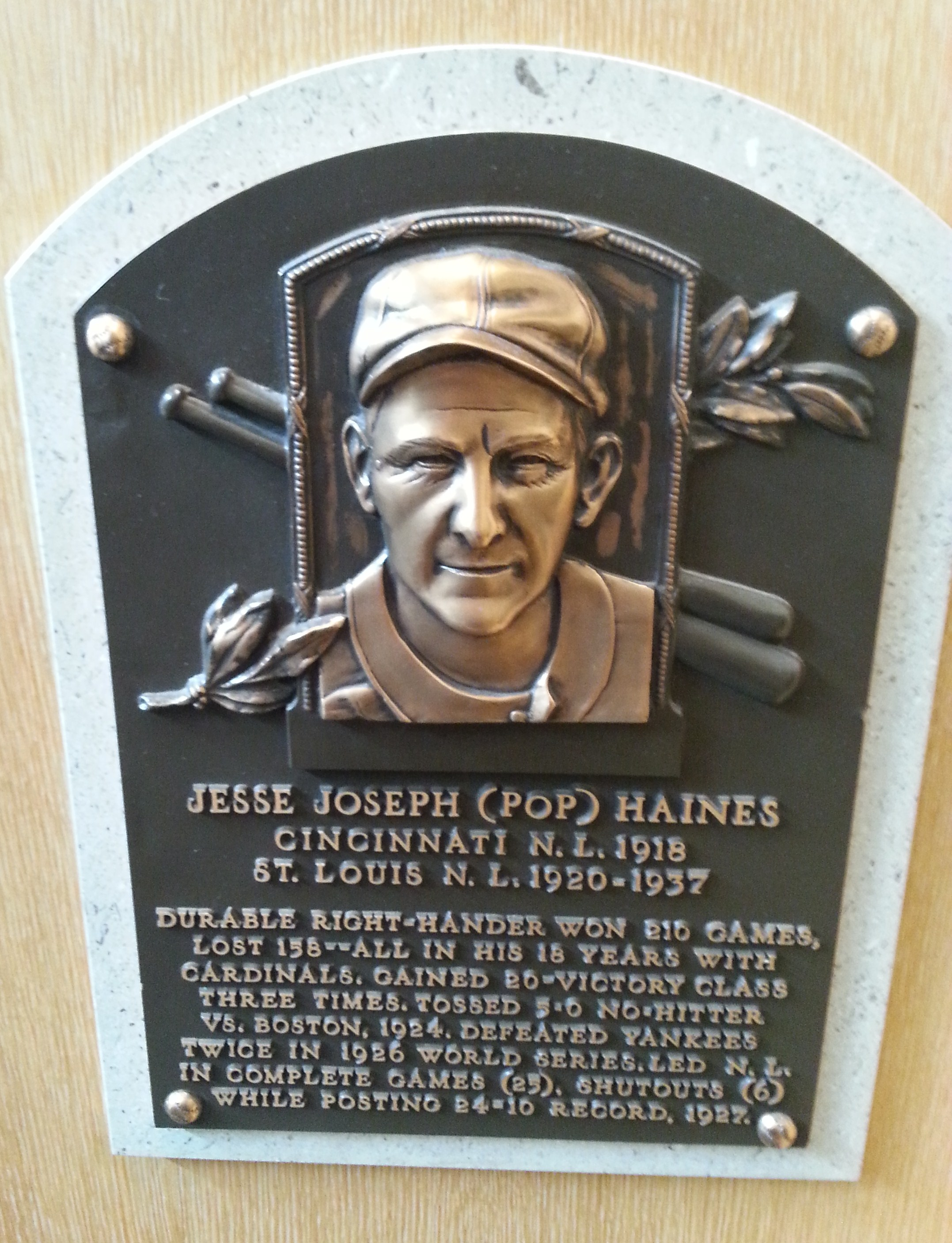
Jesse Haines plaque Baseball Hall of Fame. Haines signed his first professional contract and pitched for the 1914 Fort Wayne Railroaders

In 1914, Baseball Hall of Fame member Jesse Haines made his professional debut with Fort Wayne. Haines was signed by the Railroaders' manager Harry Martin for a salary of $135 per month, his first minor league contract. Haines pitched twice for Fort Wayne before breaking his finger in batting practice. Haines was then traded to the Saginaw Ducks of the Southern Michigan League.

The 1914 Fort Wayne "Railroaders" placed fourth as the Class B Central League played the season as a six-team league. It was the only season that Fort Wayne finished below .500 in Central League play. Harry Martin managed Fort Wayne, as the Railroaders ended the season with a 64–70 record. After the Springfield Reapers team folded on August 8, the Central League continued play to the end of the season with five teams, concluding the league schedule on September 7, 1914. The Railroaders ended the season 21.0 games behind the first place Dayton Veterans, as no league playoffs were held.

A native of Fort Wayne, Butch Henline spent time as a youth chasing foul balls during Fort Wayne Railroaders games at League Park. In 1914, the team hired Henline to be a batting practice catcher. Henline eventually developed into a professional catcher and made his major league debut with the New York Giants in 1920. Henline became a major league umpire after his playing career ended.

The Fort Wayne franchise became known as the "Cubs" as the 1915 Central League continued play, expanding to become an eight-team league from a six-team league. With a 62–60 record, Fort Wayne placed sixth, in the final Central League standings. The Cubs played the season under returning manager Bade Myers who had led the 1903 and 1904 Fort Wayne teams in their championship seasons. Fort Wayne finished 10.0 games behind the first place Evansville River Rats in the eight–team league final standings. Pitcher Earl Ainsworth led the Central League with 24 wins, while Cubs teammate Red Smyth of Fort Wayne led the league with 84 runs scored.

The Central League continued play as a Class B league in 1916, as the Fort Wayne franchise was replaced by the Muskegon Reds in league play. In 1917, the Fort Wayne "Chiefs" played the season in the eight-team league before the league folded. The Fort Wayne Chiefs would later resume play as a member of the Central League in the 1928 to 1930, 1932 and 1934 seasons.

Today, Fort Wayne hosts the Fort Wayne TinCaps, who play as a member of the Class A level Midwest League. The franchise began Midwest League play in 1993.

== The ballpark ==
The Fort Wayne minor league teams hosted minor league home games at "The Grand Dutchess." The Grand Dutchess was the nickname given to the grandstands at the League Park site in 1871, so named because of their extravagant construction for the era. The site first hosted baseball beginning in 1862. Besides Hamilton Park, the ballpark site was also known as Calhoun Street Park, League Park and Headwaters Park. The site was bordered by Lewis Street, South Calhoun Street, South Clinton Streets and Douglas Avenue in Fort Wayne.

The original ballpark grandstand was dismantled after the 1884 Northwestern League season ended. The grandstand was then rebuilt in 1890 and remained in use for the 1891 and 1892 minor league seasons. In 1893, the grandstand and fence were moved to Lakeside Park, which was one mile east of downtown Fort Wayne. The new park was referred to as both Lakeside Park and League Park until 1898. The Fort Wayne Indians of the Interstate League played at Lakeside Park until 1899, when, the ballpark grandstand was relocated back to the original Calhoun Street location, where the League Park grandstand was again rebuilt.

The infield at the League Park was changed from dirt to grass for the beginning of the 1901 season. The wooden grandstand had a 20-foot-high roof and was lengthened in 1908 to extend the bleachers down the foul lines.

In 1902, League Park hosted two games by the Cleveland Bronchos on Sundays to avoid Blue laws in Cleveland. The games were held on June 22, 1902, against the Washington Senators and August 31, 1902. Baseball Hall of Fame member Addie Joss pitched the Bronchos to a 6–4 victory on Sunday, June 22, 1902, and fellow hall of famer Cy Young and the Boston Americans beat the Bronchos 3–1 on Sunday, August 31, 1902. The two games were the last major league games hosted in Fort Wayne.

In 1913, a flood forced the team to begin the season on the road, as the clubhouse and the bleachers were destroyed, and the field was covered in mud.

In the era, the Fort Wayne minor league teams shared league Park with the Fort Wayne Colored Giants of the Negro Leagues, who began play in 1907.

On July 12, 1930, the League Park's wooden grandstand burned down with arson suspected. The stands were rebuilt by July 22, 1930, with seating capacity decreased from 5,000 to 2,000. By 1939 the site was cleared of all structures and was an open park.

Today, a historical marker has been placed at the League Park site in regards to baseball history at the location. Still in use today as a public park, the League Park location between South Clinton Street and South Calhoun Street is now known as Headwaters Park. Headwaters Park is located at 333 South Calhoun Street in Fort Wayne, Indiana.

== Timeline ==
Year(s)	# Yrs.	Team	Level	League	Ballpark
1900	1	Fort Wayne Railroaders	Class A	Western Association	The Grand Dutchess
1903–1905	4	Fort Wayne Railroaders	Class B	Central League	The Grand Dutchess
1906	1	Fort Wayne Railroaders	Class C	Interstate Association	The Grand Dutchess
1908–1910	4	Fort Wayne Billikens	Class B	Central League	The Grand Dutchess
1911	1	Fort Wayne Brakies	Class B	Central League	The Grand Dutchess
1912	1	Fort Wayne Railroaders	Class B	Central League	The Grand Dutchess
1913	1	Fort Wayne Champs	Class B	Central League	The Grand Dutchess
1914	1	Fort Wayne Railroaders	Class B	Central League	The Grand Dutchess
1915	1	Fort Wayne Cubs	Class B	Central League	The Grand Dutchess

== Year-by-year records ==
Year	Record	Finish	Manager	Playoffs / Notes
1901	73–67	4th	Doggie Miller	No playoffs held
1903	89–49	1st	Bade Myers	Won league championship No playoffs held
1904	87–51	1st	Bade Myers	Won league championship No playoffs held
1905	56–79	7th	Bade Myers / George Williams	Fort Wayne (31–41) moved to Canton July 10; No playoffs held
1906	37–22	1st	Louie Heilbroner / Jack Hardy	Won league championship League folded July 8
1908	75–65	4th	Jack Hendricks	No playoffs held
1909	71–66	3rd	Jack Hendricks	Did not qualify
1910	79–58	2nd	Jimmy Burke	No playoffs held
1911	83–54	2nd	Doc Casey	No playoffs held
1912	77–52	1st	Frank Shaughnessy	No playoffs held Won League championship (12-team league)
1913	77–63	2nd	Jimmy Burke	No playoffs held
1914	64–70	3rd	Harry Martin	No playoffs held
1915	62–60	6th	Bade Myers	No playoffs held

== Notable alumni ==
- Jesse Haines (1914) Inducted Baseball Hall of Fame, 1970
- Cy Alberts (1903–1905, 1912)
- Tommy Atkins (1913–1914)
- Charlie Babb (1901)
- Al Bashang (1913)
- Fred Bratschi (1913–1915)
- Ray Brubaker (1915)
- Jimmy Burke (1910, 1913, MGR)
- Doc Casey (1911, MGR)
- Les Channell (1909)
- Bill Clancy (1911–1912)
- Bill Cramer (1914)
- Cliff Curtis (1903)
- Pete Daniels (1901)
- Red Ehret (1901)
- Bill Essick (1903)
- Bunny Fabrique (1912–1913)
- George Fox (1901)
- Nig Fuller (1901)
- Del Gainer (1910)
- Scott Hardesty (1901)
- Jack Hardy (1903–1905; 1906, MGR)
- Jack Hendricks (1908–1909, MGR)
- Louie Heilbroner (1906, MGR)
- Bill Hopke (1903)
- Lefty Houtz (1901)
- Charlie Jaeger (1908)
- Ray Jansen (1913)
- Jim Jones (1915)
- Billy Kelly (1908)
- Tacks Latimer (1901)
- Art Loudell (1912)
- Lou Lowdermilk (1913)
- Red McDermott (1908–1910)
- Ted McGrew (1913)
- Ed McKean (1908)
- Kit McKenna (1901)
- Harl Maggert (1906)
- Charlie Malay (1901)
- Herm Malloy (1908)
- Carl Manda (1910)
- Doggie Miller (1901, MGR)
- Kohly Miller (1901)
- Walt Miller (1908–1910)
- George Mullin (1901)
- Bade Myers (1903–1905, MGR; 1906; 1915, MGR)
- Tom Needham (1901)
- Frank Oberlin (1903)
- John O'Connell (1903)
- Ollie O'Mara (1913)
- Jack Onslow (1911)
- Fred Osborn (1906)
- Harry Ostdiek (1903–1905)
- Champ Osteen (1908)
- Clare Patterson (1910)
- Jeff Pfeffer (1910)
- Frank Quinn (1901)
- Erwin Renfer (1912)
- Frank Shaughnessy (1912, MGR)
- Jack Sheehan (1915)
- Frank Smykal (1914)
- Red Smyth (1914–1915)
- John Thornton (1901)
- Guy Tutwiler (1913)
- Carl Vandagrift (1911–1912)
- Jimmy Wacker (1911)
- Del Young (1910, 1911)

== See also ==
- Fort Wayne Railroaders players
- Fort Wayne Billikens players
- Fort Wayne Brakies players
- Fort Wayne Champs players
- Fort Wayne Cubs players
- Sports in Fort Wayne, Indiana
