= William Forman =

William Forman may refer to:

- William Gordon Forman (1770–1812), American lawyer, territorial representative
- William St. John Forman (1847–1908), U.S. Representative from Illinois
- William Forman (mayor), Lord Mayor of London
- Bill Forman (baseball) (1886–1958), baseball player for the Washington Senators
- Bill Forman (radio) (1915–1966), radio announcer and actor
- Billy Forman, Neighbours character

== See also ==
- William Foreman, colonial American officer
- Charles William Forman, educator
