= Bill Hopke =

American baseball player

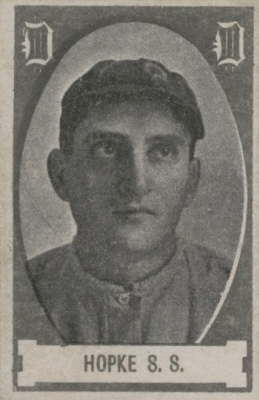
- Hopke with the Detroit Tigers during the 1909 American Series
- Infielder
- Born: November 2, 1881; Cleveland, Ohio, U.S.
- Died: April 18, 1959 (aged 77); Cleveland, Ohio, U.S.
- Batted: Right Threw: Right
- Stats at Baseball Reference

William "Silent Bill" Hopke (November 2, 1881 – April 18, 1959) was an American professional baseball infielder. He played in the minor leagues from 1902 to 1914 with several teams. Hopke also played in the 1909 American Series for the Detroit Tigers, though he never played in a major league game for Detroit. He also played for the Almendares club in the Cuban League in 1911.

== Early baseball career ==
Hopke made his professional debut with the Columbus Senators of the American Association in 1902 as a third baseman. He ended the season with a batting average of either .134 or .135. He was signed to appear with Columbus for the 1903 season, but by February he had signed with of the Fort Wayne Railroaders of the Central League. On April 17, 1903, while practicing at League Park in Fort Wayne, Hopke rescued a drowning 8-year-old boy from the St. Marys River after the child attempted to retrieve a ball that had been hit into the river. With Hopke at third base, Fort Wayne won the Central League pennant in both 1903 and 1904.

In June 1905, Hopke quit the Fort Wayne club after initially being denied a raise, and then denied his release at the end of the season. He played out the remainder of the season with the Canton Chinamen and returned for Canton for 1906, where he had a .500 batting average by May 5 and finished the year hitting .281. In February 1907, he was traded to the Indianapolis Indians of the American Association for cash, third baseman Robert Armstrong and a player to be named later, which was announced as Dan Howley in April.

As reported in The Wilkes-Barre Record in 1910, Hopke did not talk the first month of the 1907 season while with Indianapolis, and fans attempted to use sign language to communicate with him, only for Hopke to then laugh and reveal that he could speak.

While with Indianapolis, Hopke was regarded as one of the best fielding third basemen in the league. In June 1907, the Muncie Evening Press speculated that Hopke would be purchased by a major league club before the end of the season, though club leadership would not comment. He ultimately would remain with Indianapolis, and by the end of the 1908 season, the Altoona Tribune reported that Hopke had not missed a regular season professional game since the start of his career. Before the 1909 season, he was moved to shortstop after Indianapolis acquired Jimmy Burke to play third base. Midseason, Hopke missed time due to illness, ending his consecutive games played streak after being placed on the disabled list.

== Appearances with the Detroit Tigers in Cuba ==
From October 3 to December 19, 1909, Indianapolis, the Detroit Tigers and several other American all-star clubs took part in the American Series against Almendares and Habana in Havana. On November 18, Tigers shortstop Donie Bush left Cuba to return home to his ailing mother and Hopke, who had remained in Cuba following Indianapolis' games, joined the team. In early December, the Indianapolis News reported that the Tigers' players thought highly of Hopke's fielding ability and Charlie Carr was reportedly interested in trading him to Detroit for a surplus of players.

== Later career ==
Instead of making the permanent move to the major leagues, Hopke was sold to the Wilkes-Barre Barons in the New York State League on April 27, 1910. After hitting .302 in 1910, he was sold to the Topeka Jayhawks in the Western League on December 20, before being sold again to the Utica Utes of the same league in June.

In January 1912, he returned Cuba, and played in four games for Almendares in the Cuban League.

Hopke played with Utica until July 1913 when he jumped to the Indianapolis Hoosiers of the Federal League, which operated outside organized baseball. While playing in the Federal League, he was ruled ineligible for organized clubs by the National Baseball Commission. He only spent a few weeks with Indianapolis, and the following February he applied to be reinstated with the National Association of Professional Baseball Leagues. In April 1914, he was reinstated and sold to the York White Roses. He spent time with both the Lancaster Red Roses and Reading Pretzels before the season ended. He signed with Atlanta Crackers of the Southern League in February 1915, but was released before the season began. Hopke signed with the Muskegon Reds of the Central League in February 1916. In April 1920, he announced his retirement from baseball.
