= Interstate Association =

Minor league baseball league (1906)

- Classification: Class C (1906)
- Sport: Minor League Baseball
- First season: April 26, 1906
- Folded: July 8, 1906
- President: Emerson W. Dickinson (1906)
- No. of teams: 8
- Country: United States of America
- Most titles: 1 Fort Wayne (1906)

The Interstate Association was a minor league baseball league that played briefly in the 1906 season. The eight–team, Class C level Interstate association consisted of franchises based in Indiana, Ohio and Michigan. The Interstate League played a portion 1906 season before permanently folding.

== History ==
The Interstate Association began play in the 1906 season, formed as a Class C level league, with Emerson W. Dickinson serving as league president.

The 1906 Interstate Association was an eight–team league that began play on April 26, 1906. The league was formed with teams representing Anderson, Indiana, Bay City, Michigan, Flint, Michigan (Flint Vehicles), Fort Wayne, Indiana (Fort Wayne Railroaders), Lima, Ohio (Lima Lees), Marion, Indiana (Marion Moguls), Muncie, Indiana (Muncie Fruit Jars) and Saginaw, Michigan teams beginning play on April 26, 1906. During the season, Muncie and Bay city were disbanded on May 18, Saginaw moved to Marion, Ohio on June 21 before folding and Flint disbanded on July 2, 1906. The Interstate Association, with four remaining teams, permanently disbanded on July 8, 1906.

The Fort Wayne Railroaders were in first place when the Interstate Association folded on July 8, 1906. Fort Wayne finished with a record of 37–22, playing under managers Louie Heilbroner and Jack Hardy. Fort Wayne was followed by the Marion (36–24), Anderson (30–31) and Lima (26–36) teams in the final league standings.

The Interstate Association did not reform as a minor league after folding in 1906.

== Interstate Association teams ==
| Team name | City represented | Ballpark | Year |
|---|---|---|---|
| Anderson | Anderson, Indiana | Unknown | 1906 |
| Bay City | Bay City, Michigan | Clarkson Park | 1906 |
| Flint Vehicles | Flint, Michigan | Fairgrounds Field | 1906 |
| Fort Wayne Railroaders | Fort Wayne, Indiana | The Grand Dutchess | 1906 |
| Lima Lees | Lima, Ohio | San Felice Park | 1906 |
| Marion Moguls | Marion, Indiana | Unknown | 1906 |
| Marion | Marion, Ohio | Unknown | 1906 |
| Muncie Fruit Jars | Muncie, Indiana | McCulloch Park | 1906 |
| Saginaw | Saginaw, Michigan | Aces Park | 1906 |

== Standings & statistics ==
=== 1906 Interstate Association ===
| Team standings | W | L | PCT | GB | Managers |
|---|---|---|---|---|---|
| Fort Wayne Railroaders | 37 | 22 | .627 | – | Louie Heilbroner / Jack Hardy |
| Marion Moguls | 36 | 24 | .600 | 1½ | Clarence Jessup |
| Anderson | 22 | 21 | .512 | 8 | Sid Hubbard / Peaches O'Neill |
| Lima Lees | 14 | 24 | .368 | 12½ | Harry Truby |
| Flint Vehicles | 34 | 23 | .597 | NA | Joe Ganzel |
| Saginaw / Marion | 18 | 33 | .353 | NA | Bootie Wolf / A.B. Kimberly |
| Bay City | 6 | 10 | .375 | NA | John Strouthers |
| Muncie Fruit Jars | 4 | 12 | .333 | NA | Fred Paige |

Muncie and Bay city disbanded on May 18; Saginaw moved to Marion on June 21 before folding after three games; Flint disbanded July 2League Disbanded July 8, 1906
