= Dixie Walker =

American baseball player (1910–1982)

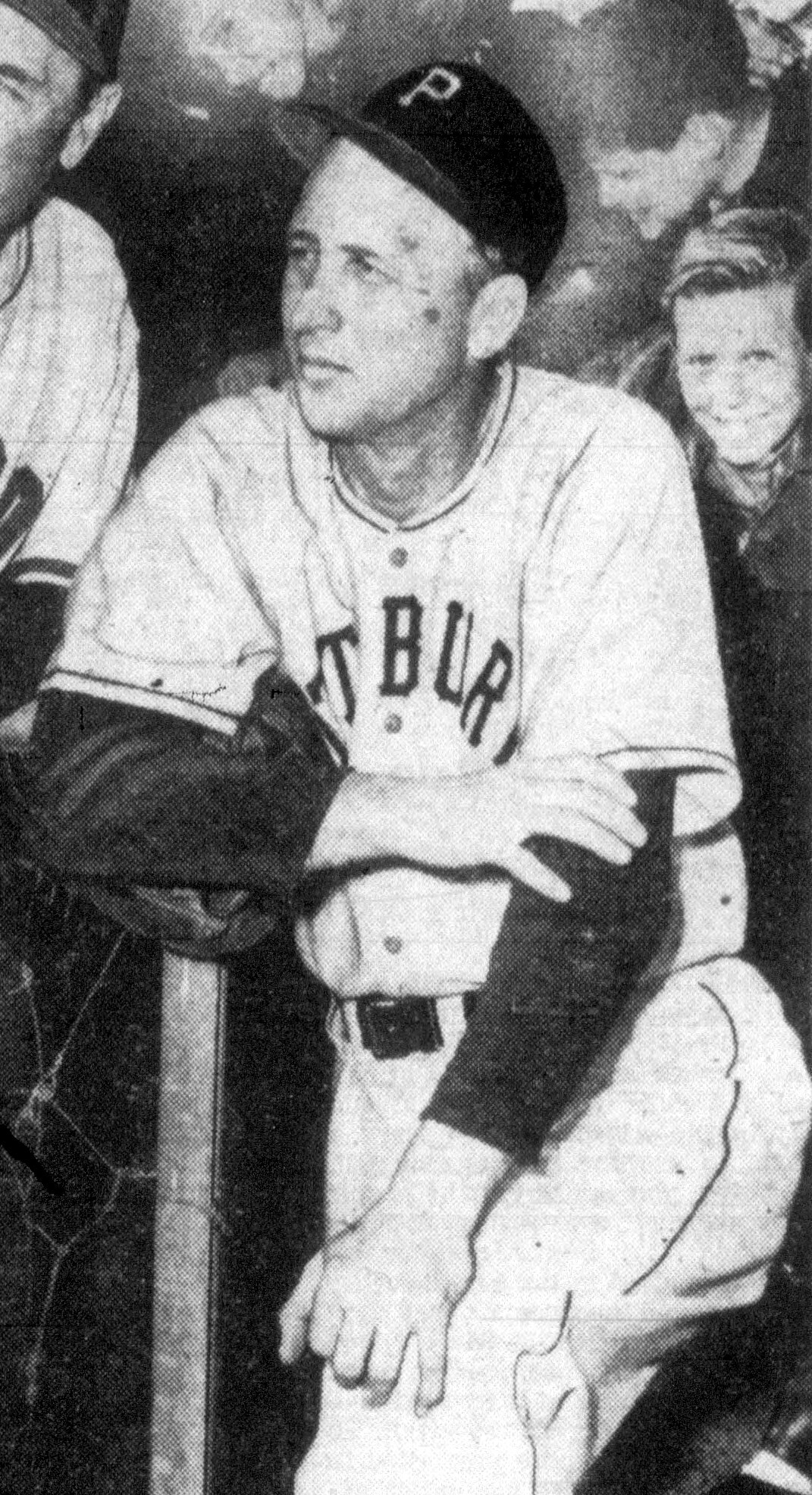
- Walker in 1949
- Outfielder
- Born: September 24, 1910; Villa Rica, Georgia, U.S.
- Died: May 17, 1982 (aged 71); Birmingham, Alabama, U.S.
- Batted: Left Threw: Right

MLB debut
- April 28, 1931, for the New York Yankees

Last MLB appearance
- September 22, 1949, for the Pittsburgh Pirates

MLB statistics
- Batting average: .306
- Hits: 2,064
- Home runs: 105
- Runs batted in: 1,023
- Stats at Baseball Reference

Teams
- New York Yankees (1931, 1933–1936); Chicago White Sox (1936–1937); Detroit Tigers (1938–1939); Brooklyn Dodgers (1939–1947); Pittsburgh Pirates (1948–1949)

Career highlights and awards
- 5× All-Star (1943–1947); NL batting champion (1944); NL RBI leader (1945)

Fred E. "Dixie" Walker (September 24, 1910 – May 17, 1982) was an American professional baseball player, coach, scout and minor league manager. He played as a right fielder in Major League Baseball from 1931 to 1949. Although Walker was a five-time All-Star selection, and won a National League batting championship (1944) as well as an RBI championship (1945) as a member of the Brooklyn Dodgers, his accomplishments as a player were overshadowed by his attempt to keep Jackie Robinson from joining the Dodgers in 1947. He also played for the New York Yankees, Chicago White Sox, Detroit Tigers and Pittsburgh Pirates.

In 11 years in the National League, Walker posted a .310 batting average (in nine seasons in the American League, an average of .295), and .306 average overall, with 105 total home runs and 1,023 RBIs in 1,905 games. Walker's popularity with the Ebbets Field fans in the 1940s brought him the nickname "the People's Cherce" (so-called, and spelled, because "Choice" in the "Brooklynese" of the mid-20th century frequently was pronounced that way).

== Early life ==
Born on September 24, 1910, in Villa Rica, Georgia, Walker was the scion of a baseball family. His father, Ewart (the original "Dixie Walker"), was a pitcher for the Washington Senators (1909–12); an uncle, Ernie Walker, was an outfielder for the St. Louis Browns (1913–15); and his younger brother, Harry "the Hat" Walker, also an outfielder, played for four National League teams between 1940 and 1955 and managed the St. Louis Cardinals (1955), Pittsburgh Pirates (1965–67) and Houston Astros (1968–72). All four Walkers batted left-handed and threw right-handed.

== Playing career ==
Walker originally entered the major leagues with the New York Yankees, and was considered the heir to Babe Ruth as the team's left fielder after playing with the Yankees in 1931, and again from 1933 to 1936.

After stints with the Chicago White Sox and Detroit Tigers, Walker blossomed into a star with the Brooklyn Dodgers, with whom he played from 1939 to 1947. He was a five time All Star, being selected in every year from 1943 to 1947. Additionally, he was the National League's batting champion in 1944, with his average of .357 besting runner up Stan Musial's .347. Additionally, Walker was the 1945 National League runs batted in champion, with his total of 124 topping Boston Braves outfielder Tommy Holmes, with 117. After the 1946 season, Walker became the first National League "player representative" recognized by major league owners. The post was created to stave off the formation of a players' union in the wake of the short-lived American Baseball Guild movement earlier that year. Johnny Murphy, the Yankees' stalwart relief pitcher, became the American League's first player representative.

After the 1947 season, Walker was traded to the Pittsburgh Pirates, for whom he played two seasons before retiring in 1949.

== Career statistics ==
In 1905 games covering 18 seasons, Walker compiled a .306 batting average (2,064-for-6,740) with 1,038 runs, 376 doubles, 96 triples, 105 home runs, 1,023 RBI, 817 base on balls, a .383 on-base percentage and a .437 slugging percentage. Defensively, he recorded a .972 fielding percentage. In the 1941 and 1947 World Series, playing for the Brooklyn Dodgers, he hit .222 (10-for-45) with one home run and four RBI.

As a pinch hitter in his MLB career, Walker was productive, recording a .288 batting average (47-for-163) with 3 home runs and 26 RBI in that role. In his last season with the Pittsburgh Pirates, he had 13 pinch hits in 37 at-bats (.351) with a home run and 9 RBI.

== Managing and coaching career ==
The Pirates released Walker after the 1949 season, and he began a managing and coaching career as manager of the minor league Atlanta Crackers. In his first year as manager, they won the Southern Association pennant. He then led them to finishes of sixth and second.

Walker coached with the St. Louis Cardinals in 1953, but left partway through the season to manage the Cardinals' Houston team in the Texas League. He managed Houston through 1954, after which he managed in the International League, first with the Rochester Red Wings (1955–1956), where he won back-to-back Governors' Cup championships, and then with the Toronto Maple Leafs (1957–1959).

The Milwaukee Braves made Walker a scout in 1960, and he worked in this position until 1963, when he joined the team's coaching staff for three years. When the Braves relocated to Atlanta in 1966, Walker was their chief scout for the Southeastern United States.

In 1968, Walker rejoined the Dodgers as hitting coach, and he held this position until 1974. From 1974 to 1976 he was a coach for the Dodgers' minor league system.

== Baseball integration ==
Walker vocally opposed the participation of black baseball players regardless of their skill but did not act on this opposition, even losing to a team of black players (Cuban All Stars) in the 1941 MLB Series with no complaints. He suggested he would not play for the Dodgers if a black baseball player were permitted on the team. He reportedly initiated a player petition within the Dodgers in 1947, opposing Jackie Robinson joining the team, and he wrote a letter to Dodgers owner Branch Rickey asking to be traded.

From the MLB Network special Jackie Robinson: ”A very popular player, a charming fellow, [Dixie Walker] prepared a petition [for Dodgers manager Leo Durocher] saying, ‘If you promote a black man [Robinson], we will not play.’ Branch Rickey [the Dodgers' president and general manager] contacted Durocher and said, ‘Stomp this fire out right now because we can’t let it spread.’" Durocher called a meeting of the players and said, "I don't care if the guy is yellow or black, or if he has stripes like a fuckin' zebra...I'm the manager of this team, and I say he plays. What's more, I say he can make us all rich." Dixie Walker left a note for Branch Rickey, asking to be traded. Leeds, Alabama, is where Dixie Walker had his hardware store. He had to go home and answer to his customers, to his friends [who asked], ‘Do you mean you shower with this guy? Do you eat with this guy? We don’t do that.’ Branch Rickey explored trading Walker, but he couldn't afford to lose his star outfielder, and he continued to rely on Leo Durocher to keep the team in line.”

In a 1981 interview, Walker said that his trade request was not due to Robinson, but because Walker had become a scapegoat for opposition within the team. In his 1993 book, The Era, 1947–1957, author Roger Kahn wrote that Walker admitted to starting the Dodgers' player petition in 1947, in which the signatories opposed the integration of baseball. In an interview with Kahn, Walker stated, "I organized that petition in 1947, not because I had anything against Robinson personally or against Negroes generally. I had a wholesale business in Birmingham and people told me I’d lose my business if I played ball with a black man." According to Kahn, Walker referred to the petition as "the stupidest thing he’d ever done" and asked Kahn that, if he had the opportunity, he would write that Walker was sorry and apologized for his actions.

In his 2014 book, Rickey & Robinson: The True, Untold Story of the Integration of Baseball, Kahn also wrote that, in May 1947, Walker — the NL's player representative — proposed the idea of a league-wide players' strike in an attempt to end Robinson's MLB career. Although the St. Louis Cardinals reportedly were in favor of the idea, the quick intervention of their owner, Sam Breadon, and National League president Ford Frick, immediately reported by Stanley Woodward in the New York Herald Tribune, destroyed the strike movement.

== Personal life ==
In 1936 Walker married Estelle Shea. They were the parents of daughters Mary Ann and Susan, and sons Stephen, Fred Jr., and Sean.

Walker died of colon cancer in Birmingham on May 17, 1982, and was buried at Elmwood Cemetery in Birmingham.

== See also ==
- List of Major League Baseball career hits leaders
- List of Major League Baseball career runs scored leaders
- List of Major League Baseball career runs batted in leaders
- List of Major League Baseball batting champions
- List of Major League Baseball annual runs batted in leaders
- List of Major League Baseball annual triples leaders
- List of Major League Baseball players to hit for the cycle
- List of St. Louis Cardinals coaches
- List of second-generation Major League Baseball players

Achievements
| Preceded by Bob Johnson | Hitting for the cycle September 2, 1944 | Succeeded by Bob Elliott |
