= Bill Yohe =

American baseball player (1878-1938)

- Third baseman
- Born: September 2, 1878; Mount Erie, Illinois, U.S.
- Died: December 24, 1938 (aged 60); Bremerton, Washington, U.S.
- Batted: Left Threw: Right

MLB debut
- August 30, 1909, for the Washington Senators

Last MLB appearance
- September 27, 1909, for the Washington Senators

MLB statistics
- Batting average: .208
- Home runs: 0
- RBI: 4
- Stats at Baseball Reference

Teams
- Washington Senators (1909)

William Clyde Yohe (September 2, 1878 – December 24, 1938) was an American professional baseball player. He played one season in Major League Baseball for the Washington Senators for 21 games during the 1909 Washington Senators season, primarily as a third baseman.
