= Harry Walker =

American baseball player and manager (1918–1999)

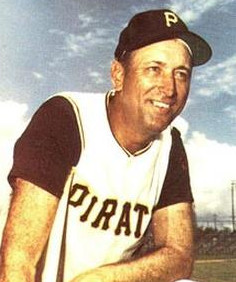
- Walker in 1966
- Center fielder / Manager
- Born: October 22, 1918; Pascagoula, Mississippi, U.S.
- Died: August 8, 1999 (aged 80); Birmingham, Alabama, U.S.
- Batted: Left Threw: Right

MLB debut
- September 25, 1940, for the St. Louis Cardinals

Last MLB appearance
- August 19, 1955, for the St. Louis Cardinals

MLB statistics
- Batting average: .296
- Home runs: 10
- Runs batted in: 214
- Managerial record: 630–604
- Winning %: .511
- Stats at Baseball Reference
- Managerial record at Baseball Reference

Teams
- As player: St. Louis Cardinals (1940–1943, 1946–1947); Philadelphia Phillies (1947–1948); Chicago Cubs (1949); Cincinnati Reds (1949); St. Louis Cardinals (1950–1951, 1955); As manager: St. Louis Cardinals (1955); Pittsburgh Pirates (1965–1967); Houston Astros (1968–1972)

Career highlights and awards
- 2× All-Star (1943, 1947); 2× World Series champion (1942, 1946); NL batting champion (1947)

Harry William Walker (October 22, 1918 – August 8, 1999) was an American professional baseball player, coach and manager. Known by the nickname "Harry the Hat", he played as a center fielder in Major League Baseball between 1940 and 1955, most notably as a member of the St. Louis Cardinals with whom he won two world championships and was the 1947 National League batting champion.

A two-time All-Star player, Walker also played for the Philadelphia Phillies, Chicago Cubs and the Cincinnati Reds. After his playing career, he served as manager for three major league teams between 1955 and 1972.

Walker served in the 65th Infantry Division in 1944 and 1945, earning a Bronze Star for valor and the Purple Heart.

== Early life and family ==
Born in Pascagoula, Mississippi, Walker was a member of a baseball family. He was the son of former Washington Senators pitcher Ewart "Dixie" Walker and the brother of Fred "Dixie" Walker, also an outfielder and National League batting champion. He was also the nephew of fellow major league outfielder Ernie Walker. Walker batted left-handed and threw right-handed; he stood 6 feet 2 inches (1.88 m) tall and weighed 175 pounds (79 kg).

== World Series star, NL batting champ ==
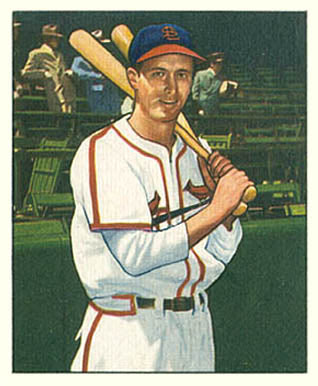
A baseball card of Walker from 1950.

"Harry the Hat" got his nickname from his habit during at-bats of continually adjusting his cap between pitches—there were no batting helmets in his day. His batting title came in 1947, when he hit .363 in a season during which he was traded from his original team, the St. Louis Cardinals, to the Philadelphia Phillies. The previous year he played for the Cardinals’ 1946 World Series championship team. In the decisive seventh game against the Boston Red Sox, with Enos Slaughter on first base, Walker doubled to left center and Slaughter scored from first base in a "mad dash" with the winning run. Walker knocked in six runs during that Series, and batted .412.

Walker lacked his brother Dixie's power—he hit only 10 home runs in 807 games played over all or parts of 11 seasons in the National League—but he compiled a .296 lifetime batting average and 786 hits with the Cardinals, Phillies, Chicago Cubs and Cincinnati Reds. Harry and Dixie Walker are the only brothers in MLB history to win batting titles, Dixie having captured the National League batting title with a .357 average in 1944 while playing for the Brooklyn Dodgers.

After prepping as a skipper in the Cardinals’ minor league system beginning in 1951, Walker was called up from Rochester in the Triple-A International League on May 28, 1955, to replace Eddie Stanky as Cardinals’ manager. Walker, then 36, was still a playing manager; he hit .357 (5-for-14) in 11 games—10 of which were as a pinch hitter—during July and August. However, the change backfired: the Cardinals fell two places in the standings under Walker, losing 67 of 118 games for a .432 winning percentage. Walker was replaced by Fred Hutchinson at the end of the 1955 season, and it would be another decade before he would again manage in the majors.

== Manager in Pittsburgh and Houston ==
During that exile, he returned to the Cardinal farm system to manage (1956–58; 1963–64), and served four years (1959–62) as a St. Louis coach. After piloting the Jacksonville Suns to the 1964 International League pennant, Walker was hired by the Pittsburgh Pirates as manager, replacing Danny Murtaugh, who stepped down for health reasons. The Pirates battled for the pennant until the closing days of the 1965 and 1966 seasons—each year finishing third behind the champion Los Angeles Dodgers and the runner-up San Francisco Giants. But when the 1967 Pirates—further strengthened by an off-season trade for standout shortstop Maury Wills—stumbled to a disappointing .500 mark in mid-season, Walker was let go on July 18 in favor of his predecessor, Murtaugh. Less than a week later, Walker was hired to be the organizational batting coach for the Houston Astros.

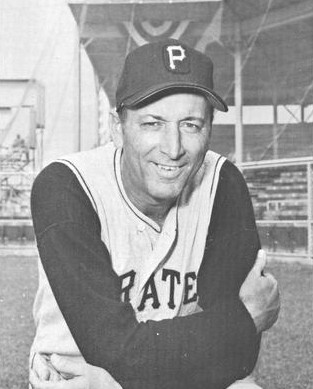
Walker in 1965

Eleven months later, on June 18, 1968, the Astros replaced skipper Grady Hatton with "Harry the Hat". The last-place 1968 Astros were only 23–38 under Hatton, but, featuring players like Joe Morgan, Jimmy Wynn, and Don Wilson, their record under Walker improved to 49–52. In 1969, they contended for the National League West Division title before fading to finish 12 games behind the Atlanta Braves. After back-to-back 79–83 marks in 1970 and 1971, Walker was sacked August 26, 1972, in favor of Leo Durocher; with the Astros at 67–54 and in third place at the time of the firing, it was Walker's best season in Houston. Over his managing career, he won 630 games, losing 604 (.511). After his firing, Walker returned to the Cardinals as a hitting instructor.

== College head baseball coach ==
Walker served as the head coach for the UAB Blazers baseball team at the University of Alabama at Birmingham from 1979 to 1986, as the program's first coach. In eight seasons, he compiled a record of 211–171, a .552 winning percentage. In 1980, the Blazers finished first in the Sun Belt Conference's North Division in the program's second season, and repeated as division champions in 1981 and 1982.

== Legacy and death ==
Walker was profiled in Jim Bouton's memoir of the 1969 season, Ball Four. Bouton mentioned that other players warned him about Walker as a guy who was going to scream at him and that he could adjust to him just like they had. Upon meeting him, Bouton felt that he would get along with Walker, and he credited him as the reason the team was doing as well as it was, one who managed to "keep everybody agitated and playing better baseball."

Walker's uniform number 32 has been retired by the UAB baseball program, and he was inducted to the Alabama Sports Hall of Fame in 1978.

Walker suffered a stroke on July 16, 1999 and went to UAB Hospital in Birmingham, Alabama. He died at the hospital on August 8. His interment was at Cedar Grove Cemetery in Leeds, Alabama. He was survived by his wife, Dot, and three daughters.

== See also ==
- List of Major League Baseball batting champions
- List of Major League Baseball annual triples leaders
- List of Major League Baseball player-managers
- List of St. Louis Cardinals coaches
- List of second-generation Major League Baseball players

Sporting positions
Preceded by Rollie Hemsley	Columbus Red Birds manager 1951	Succeeded by Johnny Keane
Preceded by Johnny Keane	Rochester Red Wings manager 1952–1955	Succeeded by Lou Kahn
Preceded by Mike Ryba	Houston Buffaloes manager 1956–1958	Succeeded by Rube Walker
Preceded by Terry Moore	St. Louis Cardinals first-base coach 1959–1962	Succeeded by Joe Schultz
Preceded by Joe Schultz	Atlanta Crackers manager 1963	Succeeded by Jack McKeon
Preceded by Casey Wise	Jacksonville Suns manager 1964	Succeeded by Grover Resinger
