= Ernie Walker (baseball) =

American baseball player (1890-1965)

- Outfielder
- Born: September 17, 1890; Blossburg, Alabama, U.S.
- Died: April 1, 1965 (aged 74); Pell City, Alabama, U.S.
- Batted: Left Threw: Right

MLB debut
- April 13, 1913, for the St. Louis Browns

Last MLB appearance
- July 6, 1915, for the St. Louis Browns

MLB statistics
- Batting average: .256
- Home runs: 1
- Runs batted in: 25
- Stats at Baseball Reference

Teams
- St. Louis Browns (1913–1915)

Ernest Robert Walker (September 17, 1890 – April 1, 1965) was an American Major League Baseball outfielder who played from 1913 to 1915 with the St. Louis Browns. He batted left and threw right-handed. Walker had a .256 batting average, with 65 career hits.

He was born in Blossburg, Alabama, and died in Pell City, Alabama. His interment was located in Birmingham's Fraternal Cemetery.

Walker was the brother of Major Leaguer Dixie Walker, and the uncle of Major Leaguers Dixie Walker and Harry Walker.
