= McCulloch Park (Muncie, Indiana) =

Public park in the US

- Location: Corner of North Broadway & East Centennial Avenue; Muncie, IN 47303; United States
- Owner: Muncie
- Operator: City of Muncie
- Capacity: 4,100
- Surface: Grass

Construction
- Opened: 1892 (Park); 1931 (Grnd)
- Demolished: 1952 (Grandstand only, fire)

Tenants
- MLB Spring Training; Pittsburgh Pirates (NL) (1943–1945); Minor League Baseball; Muncie Packers/Reds (OSL/OIL) (1947–1950); Muncie Fruit Jars (IA/IOL) (1906, 1908)

McCulloch Park is the largest community park located in Muncie, Indiana. The park is named after for local newspaper industrialist, George F. McCulloch, who gave the 118 acres of land to the city for a park in 1892. The park later consisted of a baseball field that hosted two professional teams; the Muncie Fruit Jars and the Muncie Reds. The park also served as the spring training home of the Pittsburgh Pirates from 1943 to 1945.

== Baseball ==
In 1906, Muncie fielded its first professional baseball team, the Muncie Fruit Jars, who played in the Interstate Association. The team played again in 1908 season in the Ohio–Indiana League which folded that season, on June 8, with the team in last place. Over the next two decades, McCulloch Park was home to several local semi-pro clubs. In 1931 a permanent wooden grandstand was built by the city. During the 1930s, several major league teams visited the ballpark. On one notable occasion, the St. Louis Browns lost a game to one of Muncie's local teams.

In 1943, the Pittsburgh Pirates traveled to Muncie for the club's spring training session. During this time, the United States was fighting in World War II. The Pirates' selection of Muncie was part of an effort by Major League Baseball to reduce team travel expenses, due to the lower revenues brought about by the war. The 1943 Pirates were managed Frank Frisch and Honus Wagner, both men were Hall of Famers. Their presence helped the team establish a fanbase in Muncie. During the Pirates' stay, other major league teams traveled to McCulloch Park to play them. Rudy York, of the Detroit Tigers, is credited for hitting the longest home run out of the Park.

Once the war ended, the Pirates ended their spring training relationship with Muncie. However, the Cincinnati Reds established a minor league affiliate in the city, called the Muncie Reds. The Reds played at McCulloch Park from 1947 to 1950. Future Cincinnati Reds standouts, Joe Nuxhall and Wally Post, played for Muncie in 1947 and they were among six Muncie Reds players who would later play in the majors.

The Reds disbanded in 1950 and the field was once again used only by amateur and semi-pro clubs.

== Today ==
On Friday, June 13, 1952, a fire completely destroyed the Park's grandstand. The grandstand was never replaced, however the field was refurbished and has been maintained since. The park is still in operation today. It is accessible to the community and includes playgrounds, a disc golf course, a soap box derby track, basketball courts, baseball fields, picnic areas, a park lodge rental facility, restrooms, and fishing/boating areas.

== See also ==
- Muncie Reds
