= Mount Erie, Illinois =

Mount Erie
- Village
- Location of Mount Erie in Wayne County, Illinois.
- Coordinates: 38°30′53″N 88°13′57″W
- Country: United States
- State: Illinois
- County: Wayne

Area
  - Total: 0.38 sq mi (0.99 km^{2})
  - Land: 0.38 sq mi (0.99 km^{2})
  - Water: 0 sq mi (0.00 km^{2})
- Elevation: 515 ft (157 m)

Population (2020)
  - Total: 98
  - Density: 255.5/sq mi (98.66/km^{2})
- Time zone: UTC−6 (CST)
  - Summer (DST): UTC−5 (CDT)
- ZIP code: 62446
- Area code: 618
- FIPS code: 17–50933
- GNIS feature ID: 2399411

Mount Erie is a village in Wayne County, Illinois, United States. As of the 2020 census, Mount Erie had a population of 98.

== Geography ==
According to the 2010 census, Mount Erie has a total area of 0.4 square miles (1.04 km^{2}), all land.

== Demographics ==
Historical population
Census	Pop.	Note	%±
1880	294		—
1890	266		−9.5%
1900	308		15.8%
1910	299		−2.9%
1920	230		−23.1%
1930	176		−23.5%
1940	200		13.6%
1950	149		−25.5%
1960	134		−10.1%
1970	149		11.2%
1980	135		−9.4%
1990	137		1.5%
2000	105		−23.4%
2010	88		−16.2%
2020	98		11.4%
U.S. Decennial Census

As of the census of 2000, there were 105 people, 47 households, and 32 families residing in the village. The population density was 269.7 inhabitants per square mile (104.1/km^{2}). There were 60 housing units at an average density of 154.1 units per square mile (59.5 units/km^{2}). The racial makeup of the village was 99.05% White, and 0.95% from two or more races. Hispanic or Latino of any race were 1.90% of the population.

There were 47 households, out of which 25.5% had children under the age of 18 living with them, 53.2% were married couples living together, 14.9% had a female householder with no husband present, and 31.9% were non-families. 29.8% of all households were made up of individuals, and 8.5% had someone living alone who was 65 years of age or older. The average household size was 2.23 and the average family size was 2.66.

In the village, the age distribution of the population shows 24.8% under the age of 18, 7.6% from 18 to 24, 21.0% from 25 to 44, 24.8% from 45 to 64, and 21.9% who were 65 years of age or older. The median age was 40 years. For every 100 females, there were 128.3 males. For every 100 females age 18 and over, there were 119.4 males.

The median income for a household in the village was $23,750, and the median income for a family was $33,333. Males had a median income of $18,750 versus $15,625 for females. The per capita income for the village was $10,532. There were 12.5% of families and 19.2% of the population living below the poverty line, including 44.4% of under eighteens and 20.8% of those over 64.

== Notable people ==
- Bill Yohe, third baseman for the Washington Senators
