= Dutch Hinrichs =

American baseball player (1889-1972)

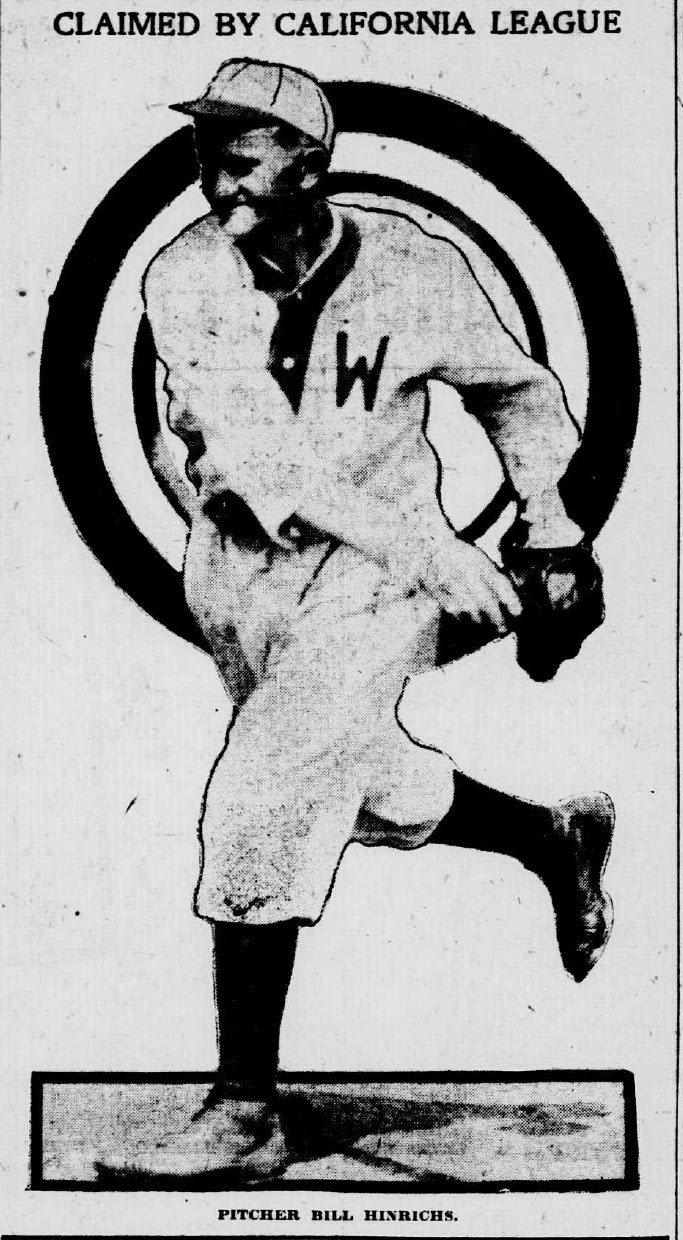
- Pitcher
- Born: April 27, 1889; Orange, California
- Died: April 18, 1972 (aged 82); Kingsburg, California
- Batted: Right Threw: Right

MLB debut
- June 25, 1910, for the Washington Senators

Last MLB appearance
- July 8, 1910, for the Washington Senators

MLB statistics
- Win–loss record: 0-1
- Earned run average: 2.57
- Strikeouts: 5
- Stats at Baseball Reference

Teams
- Washington Senators (1910)

William Louis "Dutch" Hinrichs (April 27, 1889 – April 18, 1972) was a pitcher in Major League Baseball. He played for the Washington Senators in 1910.
