= Lima Lees =

The Lima Lees were a minor league professional baseball team that played in the Ohio–Pennsylvania League and Interstate Association. In 1905, the club was managed by Eddie Bailey; in 1906, Harry Truby led the team. Bob Bescher is one known major leaguer to spend time with the club. It was the first pro baseball team to be based in Lima, Ohio since 1895.
