= Doc Ralston =

American baseball player (1885-1950)

- Outfielder
- Born: August 3, 1885; Pierpont, Ohio
- Died: August 29, 1950 (aged 65); Lancaster, Pennsylvania
- Batted: Right Threw: Right

MLB debut
- September 8, 1910, for the Washington Senators

Last MLB appearance
- October 6, 1910, for the Washington Senators

MLB statistics
- Batting average: .205
- Home runs: 0
- Runs batted in: 3
- Stats at Baseball Reference

Teams
- Washington Senators (1910)

Samuel Beryl Ralston (August 3, 1885 – August 29, 1950) was an outfielder in Major League Baseball. He played for the Washington Senators in 1910.
