= Warren Miller (baseball) =

American baseball player

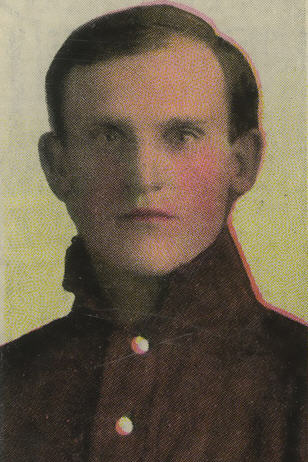
- Outfielder
- Born: July 14, 1885; Philadelphia, Pennsylvania, U.S.
- Died: August 12, 1956 (aged 71); Philadelphia, Pennsylvania, U.S.
- Batted: Left Threw: Left

MLB debut
- July 29, 1909, for the Washington Senators

Last MLB appearance
- June 9, 1911, for the Washington Senators

MLB statistics
- Batting average: .188
- Home runs: 0
- Runs batted in: 1
- Stats at Baseball Reference

Teams
- Washington Senators (1909, 1911)

Warren Lemuel Miller (July 14, 1885 – August 12, 1956) was an American outfielder in Major League Baseball. Nicknamed "Gitz", he played for the Washington Senators in 1909 and 1911.
