= Speed Kelly =

American baseball player

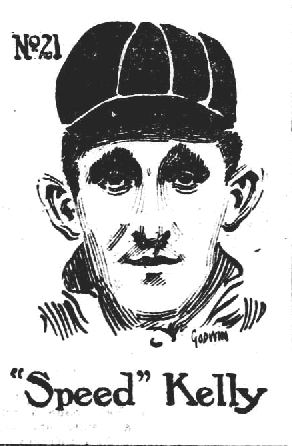
- Third baseman
- Born: August 19, 1884; Bryan, Ohio, U.S.
- Died: May 6, 1949 (aged 64); Goshen, Indiana, U.S.
- Batted: Right Threw: Right

MLB debut
- July 13, 1909, for the Washington Senators

Last MLB appearance
- October 1, 1909, for the Washington Senators

MLB statistics
- Batting average: .143
- Home runs: 0
- Runs batted in: 1
- Stats at Baseball Reference

Teams
- Washington Senators (1909)

Robert Brown "Speed" Kelly (August 19, 1884 – May 6, 1949) was an American third baseman in Major League Baseball. He played for the Washington Senators in 1909.
