= Joe Ohl =

American baseball player (1888-1951)

- Pitcher
- Born: January 10, 1888; Jobstown, New Jersey, U.S.
- Died: December 18, 1951 (aged 63); Camden, New Jersey, U.S.
- Batted: Left Threw: Left

MLB debut
- July 29, 1909, for the Washington Senators

Last MLB appearance
- August 5, 1909, for the Washington Senators

MLB statistics
- Win–loss record: 0–0
- Earned run average: 2.08
- Strikeouts: 2
- Stats at Baseball Reference

Teams
- Washington Senators (1909)

Joseph Earl von Ohl (January 10, 1888 – December 18, 1951) was an American pitcher in Major League Baseball. He played for the Washington Senators in 1909.

Ohl was born in the Jobstown section of Springfield Township, Burlington County, New Jersey.

Ohl's father, Rudolph, was the traveling secretary of the Philadelphia Athletics. Ohl lived for forty years in Merchantville, New Jersey until his death at Cooper University Hospital in 1951.
