= Frank Oberlin =

American baseball player (1876–1952)

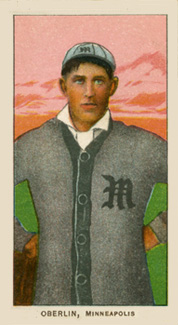
- Pitcher
- Born: March 29, 1876; Elsie, Michigan, U.S.
- Died: January 6, 1952 (aged 75); Ashley, Indiana, U.S.
- Batted: Right Threw: Right

MLB debut
- September 20, 1906, for the Boston Americans

Last MLB appearance
- June 28, 1910, for the Washington Senators

MLB statistics
- Win–loss record: 5-24
- Earned run average: 3.77
- Strikeouts: 80
- Stats at Baseball Reference

Teams
- Boston Americans (1906–1907); Washington Senators (1907, 1909–1910)

Frank Rufus "Flossie" Oberlin (March 29, 1876 – January 6, 1952) was an American Major League Baseball pitcher for the Boston Americans and Washington Senators.

== Biography ==
Oberlin was born on March 29, 1876, in Elsie, Michigan. Oberlin did not play professionally until age 26, when he joined the minor league Lansing Senators of the Michigan State League in 1902. In 1906, while playing for the Milwaukee Brewers of the American Association, he was acquired by the Americans, and made his major league debut for them in September.

Oberlin pitched four games for the Americans that year, going 1-3, striking out 13 batters and having an ERA of just 3.18. Oberlin pitched 12 games with the Americans the next year before his contract was sold to the Washington Senators in August. He pitched 11 more games with the Senators, finishing his 1907 season with a total record of 3-11.

Oberlin spent 1908 with the minor league Minneapolis Millers. He returned to the Senators for the 1909 and 1910 seasons. He was back in the minor leagues in 1911 with the Utica Utes of the New York State League, for whom he played until 1916. He finished the 1916 season with the NYSL's Scranton Miners before retiring at age 40.

On January 6, 1952, Oberlin died at age 75 in Ashley, Indiana. He was buried in Hamilton, Indiana.
