= Ed Moyer =

American baseball player (1885-1962)

- Pitcher
- Born: August 15, 1885; Andover, Ohio, U.S.
- Died: November 18, 1962 (aged 77); Jacksonville, Florida, U.S.
- Batted: Unknown Threw: Unknown

MLB debut
- July 20, 1910, for the Washington Senators

Last MLB appearance
- October 4, 1910, for the Washington Senators

MLB statistics
- Win–loss record: 0–3
- Earned run average: 3.24
- Strikeouts: 3
- Stats at Baseball Reference

Teams
- Washington Senators (1910)

Charles Edward Moyer (August 15, 1885 – November 18, 1962) was an American pitcher in Major League Baseball. He played for the Washington Senators in 1910.

Moyer died the same day Jamie Moyer was born, who happens to be the only other Major League Baseball player with the last name, Moyer.
