= Muncie Fruit Jars =

- (1906, 1908); Muncie, Indiana

Minor league affiliations
- Previous classes: Class D (1908); Class C (1906)
- Previous leagues: Indiana-Ohio League (1908); Interstate Association (1906)

Team data
- Previous parks: McCulloch Park

The Muncie Fruit Jars were a professional minor league baseball team based in Muncie, Indiana. The club was first formed in 1906 as a team in the class-C Interstate Association. The Fruit Jars' name was inspired by Muncie's local economy, which was the home of Ball Brothers Glass Manufacturing Company, famous for producing glass canning jars.

The team was expelled from the league on May 18, 1906, after posting a 4–12 record. Less than two months later, the league folded on July 8, 1906. The team was fielded again in 1908 as a member of the class-D Indiana-Ohio League. The league began play on May 9, however it was forced to fold on June 8, 1908. The Fruit Jars finished with a 10–14 record and disbanded with the league. The team played its home games at McCulloch Park.

== Year-by-year records ==
| Year | Record | Finish | Manager | Playoffs |
|---|---|---|---|---|
| 1906 | 4-12 | NA | Fred Paige | Team was expelled on May 18 |
| 1908 | 10-14 | 4th | Dick Baird/Wills | |
