= Jimmy Burke (baseball) =

American baseball player and manager (1874–1942)

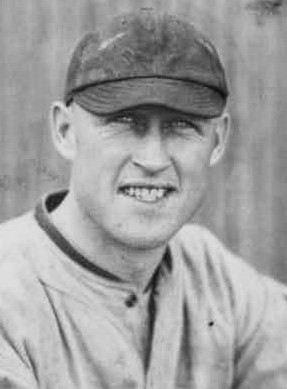
- Third baseman / Manager
- Born: October 12, 1874; St. Louis, Missouri, U.S.
- Died: March 26, 1942 (aged 67); St. Louis, Missouri, U.S.
- Batted: Right Threw: Right

MLB debut
- October 6, 1898, for the Cleveland Spiders

Last MLB appearance
- October 8, 1905, for the St. Louis Cardinals

MLB statistics
- Batting average: .244
- Home runs: 1
- Runs batted in: 187
- Games managed: 445
- Managerial record: 206–236
- Winning %: .466
- Stats at Baseball Reference

Teams
- As player: Cleveland Spiders (1898); St. Louis Perfectos (1899); Milwaukee Brewers (1901); Chicago White Sox (1901); Pittsburgh Pirates (1901–1902); St. Louis Cardinals (1903–1905); As manager: St. Louis Cardinals (1905); St. Louis Browns (1918–1920); As coach: Detroit Tigers (1914–1917); Boston Red Sox (1921–1923); Chicago Cubs (1926–1930); New York Yankees (1931–1933)

Career highlights and awards
- World Series champion (1932)

James Timothy Burke (October 12, 1874 – March 26, 1942) was an American Major League Baseball third baseman, coach, and manager. He played for the Cleveland Spiders, St. Louis Perfectos, Milwaukee Brewers, Chicago White Stockings, Pittsburgh Pirates, and St. Louis Cardinals.

Burke was the regular third baseman for the Cardinals from 1903 to 1905. He was named player-manager in the middle of the 1905, season but was replaced by Stanley Robison after amassing a record of 34–56.

== Playing career ==
Burke made his debut in October 1898 for the Cleveland Spiders. He was one of many players moved from Cleveland to St. Louis the following season, a move that stocked Cleveland with inferior and inept ball players that resulted in that team producing the worst record ever in Major league baseball. Burke only played a couple of games for St. Louis, now called the St. Louis Perfectos.

In 1901, he split time between the Milwaukee Brewers and Chicago White Sox of the American League. After being released by Chicago in 1901, he signed with the National League's Pittsburgh Pirates where once again he played only occasionally.

Burke never got anywhere near close to regular playing time until he was traded by Pittsburgh to the St. Louis Cardinals. In 1903, his first season with significant playing time, he batted .285 and rove in 42 runs. However, despite in appearing in over hundred games in both of the next seasons, Burke found himself playing for the Kansas City Blues in the minor leagues. Burke never again played in the majors, finishing his career with the Fort Wayne Champs of the Central League in 1913.

== Coaching ==
From 1914 through 1917, Burke was a coach for the Detroit Tigers. He then served as manager for the St. Louis Browns from 1918 through 1920. In 1921, he became a coach for the Boston Red Sox, a position he held for three seasons. Burke later was a coach for the Chicago Cubs from 1926 through 1930, and was last a coach with the New York Yankees from 1931 through 1933.

== Managerial record ==
Team	Year	Regular season					Postseason			
Team	Year	Games	Won	Lost	Win %	Finish	Won	Lost	Win %	Result
STL	1905	90	34	56	.378	interim	–	–	–	–
STL total		90	34	56	–		0	0	–	
SLB	1918	60	29	31	.483	5th in AL	–	–	–	–
SLB	1919	139	67	72	.482	5th in AL	–	–	–	–
SLB	1920	153	76	77	.497	4th in AL	–	–	–	–
SLB total		352	172	180	.489		0	0	–	
Total		442	206	236	.466		0	0	–	

== See also ==
- List of Major League Baseball player–managers

Preceded by N/A	Boston Red Sox Pitching Coach; 1921–1923	Succeeded by Jack Ryan
