= Dixie Walker (pitcher) =

American baseball player (1887–1965)

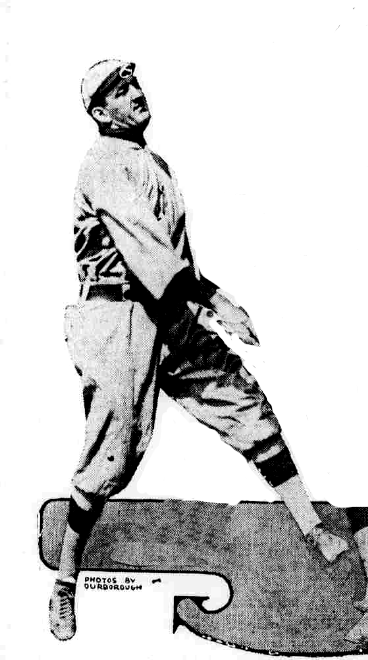
- Pitcher
- Born: June 1, 1887; Brownsville, Pennsylvania, U.S.
- Died: November 14, 1965 (aged 78); Leeds, Alabama, U.S.
- Batted: Left Threw: Right

MLB debut
- September 17, 1909, for the Washington Senators

Last MLB appearance
- May 29, 1912, for the Washington Senators

MLB statistics
- Win–loss record: 25-31
- Earned run average: 3.52
- Strikeouts: 203
- Stats at Baseball Reference

Teams
- Washington Senators (1909–1912)

Ewart Gladstone "Dixie" Walker (June 1, 1887 – November 14, 1965) was an American Major League Baseball pitcher who played from 1909 to 1912 with the Washington Senators. He batted left and threw right-handed. Walker had a 25–31 record in 74 career games.

His best season was in 1910, when he went 11-11 with a 3.30 ERA.

He was born in Brownsville, Pennsylvania, and died in Leeds, Alabama. His given names "Ewart Gladstone" would appear to honor William Ewart Gladstone, who served as British prime minister at various junctures between 1868 and 1894.

Walker was the brother of Major Leaguer Ernie Walker, and the father of Major Leaguers Dixie Walker and Harry Walker. Walker is buried in Birmingham's Elmwood Cemetery.
