= Joe Hovlik =

American baseball player (1884–1951)

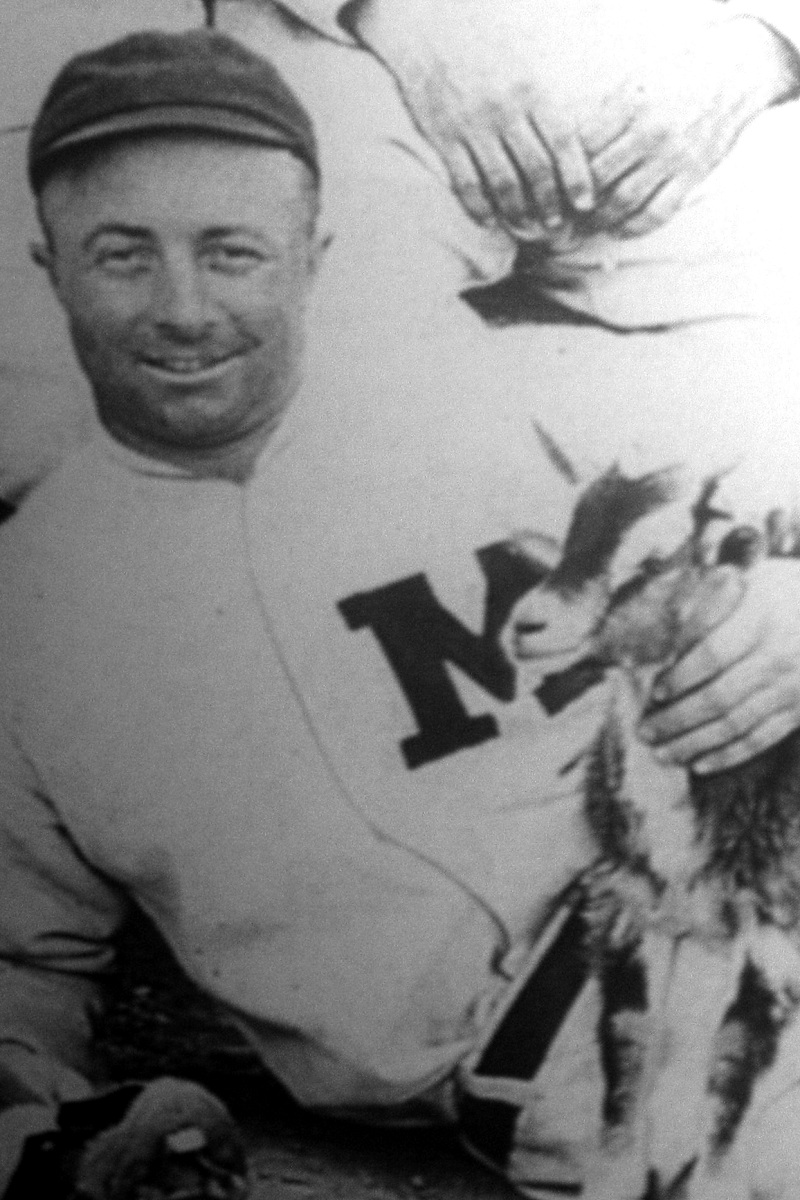
- Pitcher
- Born: August 16, 1884; Austria-Hungary
- Died: November 2, 1951 (aged 67); Oxford Junction, Iowa, U.S.
- Batted: Right Threw: Right

MLB debut
- July 10, 1909, for the Washington Senators

Last MLB appearance
- September 25, 1911, for the Chicago White Sox

MLB statistics
- Win–loss record: 2-0
- Earned run average: 3.62
- Strikeouts: 25
- Stats at Baseball Reference

Teams
- Washington Senators (1909–1910); Chicago White Sox (1911)

Joseph Hovlik (August 16, 1884 – November 3, 1951) was an American professional baseball pitcher who played in the major leagues from 1909 to 1911. He played for the Chicago White Sox and Washington Senators.
