= Jack Hardy (catcher) =

American baseball player (1877–1921)

- Catcher
- Born: June 23, 1877; Cleveland, Ohio, U.S.
- Died: October 20, 1921 (aged 44); Cleveland, Ohio, U.S.
- Batted: Right Threw: Right

MLB debut
- August 29, 1903, for the Cleveland Naps

Last MLB appearance
- June 28, 1910, for the Washington Senators

MLB statistics
- Batting average: .182
- Home runs: 0
- Runs batted in: 5
- Stats at Baseball Reference

Teams
- Cleveland Naps (1903); Chicago Cubs (1907); Washington Senators (1909–1910)

John Doolittle Hardy (June 23, 1877 – October 20, 1921) was an American professional baseball player for nine seasons from 1903 to 1911. Used principally as a catcher and outfielder, he played parts of four seasons in Major League Baseball for the Cleveland Naps, Chicago Cubs, and Washington Senators. He also played several seasons in Minor League Baseball, appeared in a total 642 professional games.

== Early years ==
Hardy was born in 1877 in Cleveland.

== Professional baseball ==
The earliest record of Hardy's participation in professional baseball is from 1903 when, at age 26, Hardy played five games for the Cleveland Naps of the American League, 74 games for the Los Angeles team in the Pacific National League, and 21 games for the Fort Wayne Railroaders of the Central League.

He spent the 1904 season with the Fort Wayne club, appearing in 115 games and compiling a .299 batting average. He continued in the minor leagues with Fort Wayne and Canton in 1905 and with the Sharon Steels in 1906. He also played during the 1905 season for the "Ohio Works" team in Youngstown, Ohio. After he compiled a .441 batting average for Ohio Works, The Youngstown Vindicator offered a fan's account of his talents: "Hardy was a great player, he had a million dollar eye, a thousand dollar arm and a two bit head."

Hardy began the 1907 season with the Nashville Volunteers of the Southern Association. He joined the Volunteers as an outfielder, but the team had a surplus of players at that position. He filled in at several positions and eventually became the team's leading catcher. He compiled a .312 batting average during the 1907 season, ranking him among the leading batters in the Southern Association.

In late August 1907, after his strong showing in Nashville, Hardy joined the Chicago Cubs. He appeared in only one game for the Cubs, managing one hit in four at bats.

After his second stint in the majors ended, Hardy returned to Nashville for the 1908 season. He appeared in 60 games for Nashville in 1908, though his batting average plummeted by more than 100 points from his 1907 tally.

Hardy began the 1909 season with the Mobile Sea Gulls of the Southern Association. In August 1909, he was acquired by the Washington Senators of the American League. In his third and final stint in the majors, he appeared in 17 games, 13 of them as a catcher, during the 1909 and 1910 seasons. He appeared in his final major league game on June 28, 1910. He was released by the Senators in July 1910.

Hardy concluded his professional baseball career with the Montreal Royals of the Eastern League. He appeared in 85 games for the Royals during the 1910 and 1911 seasons. He compiled a career-high .330 batting average during the 1910 season. In his final season, he hit .320 for the Royals.

Over the course of nine seasons in professional baseball, Hardy appeared in 642 games and totaled 585 hits in 1,843 plate appearances.

== Personal life and later years ==
In July 1903, Hardy married Emma Marquardt. The ceremony was held at the Kenyon Hotel in Salt Lake City.

After his professional baseball career ended, he continued to play semi-professional baseball, joining the Guttridge and Rand team in 1912.

Hardy died in Cleveland in 1921. He was 44 years old at the time of his death. He was buried at the Lakewood Park Cemetery in Rocky River, Ohio.
