= Bill Forman (baseball) =

American baseball player (1886-1958)

- Pitcher
- Born: October 10, 1886; Venango, Pennsylvania
- Died: October 2, 1958 (aged 71); Uniontown, Pennsylvania
- Batted: Both Threw: Right

MLB debut
- September 20, 1909, for the Washington Senators

Last MLB appearance
- July 9, 1910, for the Washington Senators

MLB statistics
- Win–loss record: 0-2
- Earned run average: 5.40
- Strikeouts: 2
- Stats at Baseball Reference

Teams
- Washington Senators (1909–1910)

William Orange Forman (October 10, 1886 – October 2, 1958) was a pitcher in Major League Baseball. He played for the Washington Senators.
