= 1907 Detroit Tigers season =

Major League Baseball season

1907 Detroit Tigers
- American League champions
- League: American League
- Ballpark: Bennett Park
- City: Detroit, Michigan
- Record: 92–58 (.613)
- League place: 1st
- Owners: William H. Yawkey
- Managers: Hughie Jennings

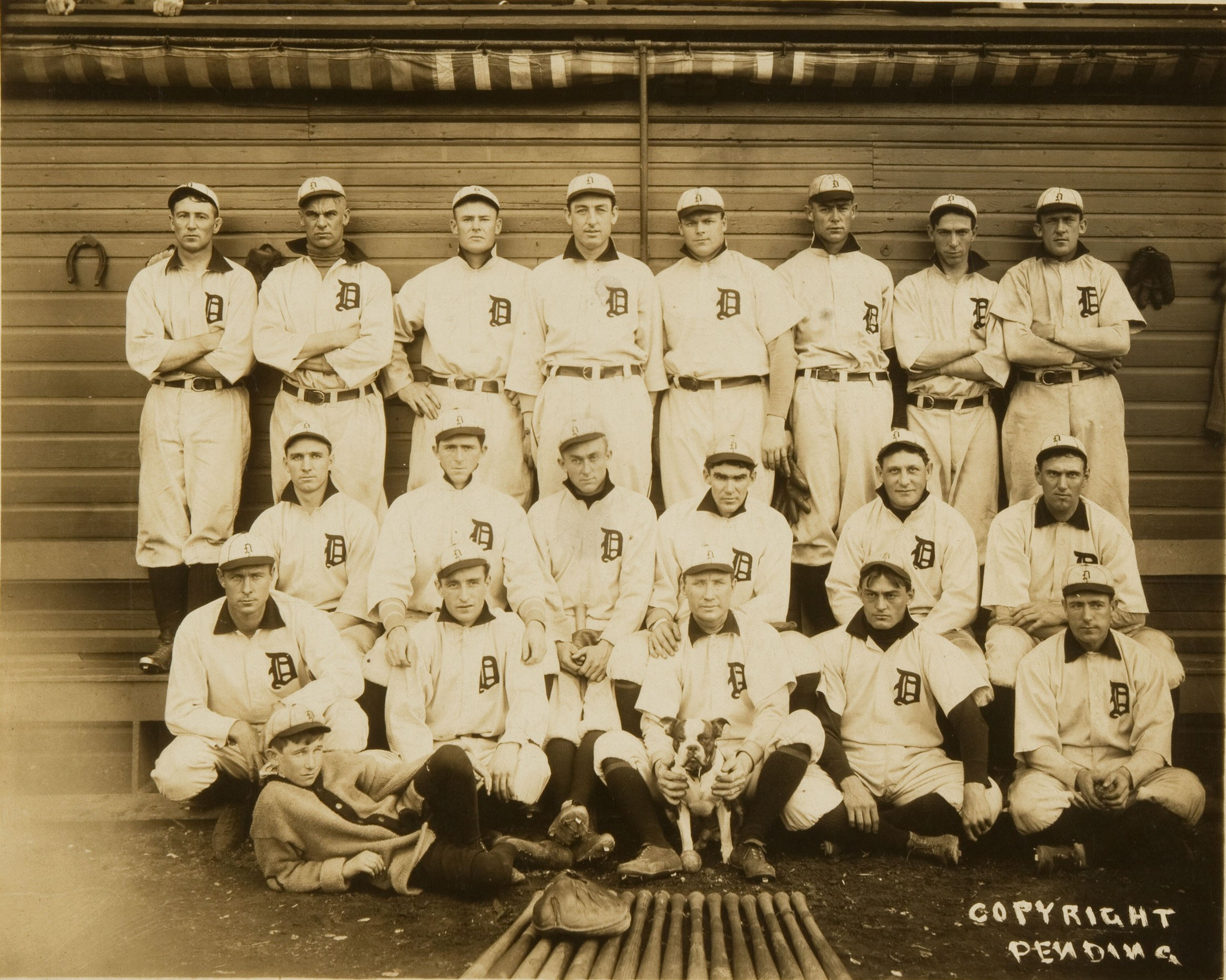

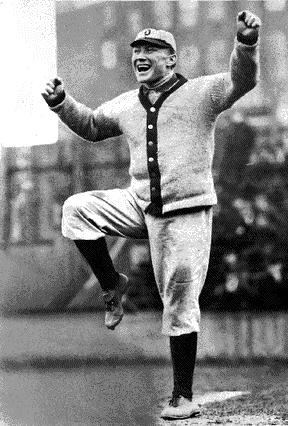
Hughie Jennings

The 1907 Detroit Tigers won the American League pennant with a record of 92–58, but lost to the Chicago Cubs in the 1907 World Series, four games to none (with one tie). The season was their seventh since they entered the American League in 1901.

== Offseason ==
In March 1907, Detroit manager Hughie Jennings actually offered Ty Cobb to the Cleveland Naps in exchange for Elmer Flick. The Naps refused the deal.

== Regular season ==
=== Season summary ===
The 1907 season was the first year the Tigers won the American League pennant. Their 1907 record of 92–58 was the team's best record to that point. Led by Ty Cobb, who led the American League in batting average (Cobb's first batting crown), RBIs, and slugging percentage, and Sam Crawford, who led the league in runs scored and extra base hits, they scored 89 more runs than any other team in the American League and outscored their opponents 694 to 532. They finished 1½ games ahead of the A's.

The Athletics and Detroit Tigers vied for the pennant through the 1907 season. The Tigers came into Philadelphia for a three game series on September 27, 1907 in a virtual tie for first-place. Detroit took the first game 5-4 to move in front of an official attendance of 17,926, exceeding Columbia Park's capacity. Saturday's game was postponed by rain, and Pennsylvania Blue Laws precluded play on Sunday. A double-header was scheduled for Monday. Detroit's Bill Donovan had pitched a complete game in the Friday game and was slated to start both games of the double-header.

With a week left in the season, Athletics fans were eager to see the team capture the pennant. It was estimated that the team could have sold 50,000 tickets to the Monday double-header. With Columbia Park's limited capacity, an overflow crowd spilled into a roped-off area on the outfield grass. The gates were locked 30 minutes before game time with thousands of fans outside unable to gain admittance. Fans stormed the gates and climbed over the outside fence, with more than the official 24,127 seeing the game. The Philadelphia Inquirer would remark on the crowd, "Never before in the history of the national game has so great and remarkable a gathering of its enthusiastic followers been held anywhere." Fans scaled trolley and telegraph poles to watch the game. Local residents charged as much as $1 to $5 a person ($35 to $125 in 2025-dollars) to watch the game from windows. On the Twenty-ninth street side of the park, a fan in the grandstand lowered a rope up which fans scrambled from the street and into the park. Large men charged ten-cents to boost fans over the fence and into the park. Down by six in the fifth, the Tigers came into the ninth down 8-6. Sam Crawford opened the ninth with a single off of future Hall of Fame Rube Waddell bringing 20-year year old Ty Cobb to the plate. Cobb crushed Waddell's pitch, clearing the right-field fence by fifty-feet and onto 29th Street for a game-tying homerun. The teams both scored in the eleventh and would battle to a 9-9 tie in 17-innings before darkness ended the game. The Philadelphia Inquirer would call it "the most remarkable game ever played on the Athletic ground." Reflecting on his career in 1930, Cobb would tell Grantland Rice, "The biggest thrill I ever got came in a game was against the Athletics in 1907 [on September 30]... The Athletics had us beaten, with Rube Waddell pitching. They were two runs ahead in the 9th inning, when I happened to hit a home run that tied the score. This game went 17 innings to a tie, and a few days later, we clinched our first pennant. You can understand what it meant for a 20-year-old country boy to hit a home run off the great Rube, in a pennant-winning game with two outs in the ninth."

The 1907 Tigers' winning percentage ranks as the 9th best in team history, as follows:

Best Seasons in Detroit Tigers History
Rank	Year	Wins	Losses	Win %	Finish
1	1934	101	53	.656	Lost 1934 World Series to Cardinals
2	1915	100	54	.649	2nd in AL behind Red Sox
3	1909	98	54	.645	Lost 1909 World Series to Pirates
4	1984	104	58	.642	Won 1984 World Series over Padres
5	1968	103	59	.636	Won 1968 World Series over Cardinals
6	1961	101	61	.623	2nd in AL behind Yankees
7	1950	95	59	.617	2nd in AL behind Yankees
8	1935	93	58	.616	Won 1935 World Series over Cubs
9	1907	92	58	.613	Lost 1907 World Series to Cubs
10	1987	98	64	.605	Lost 1987 ALCS to Twins

=== The players ===
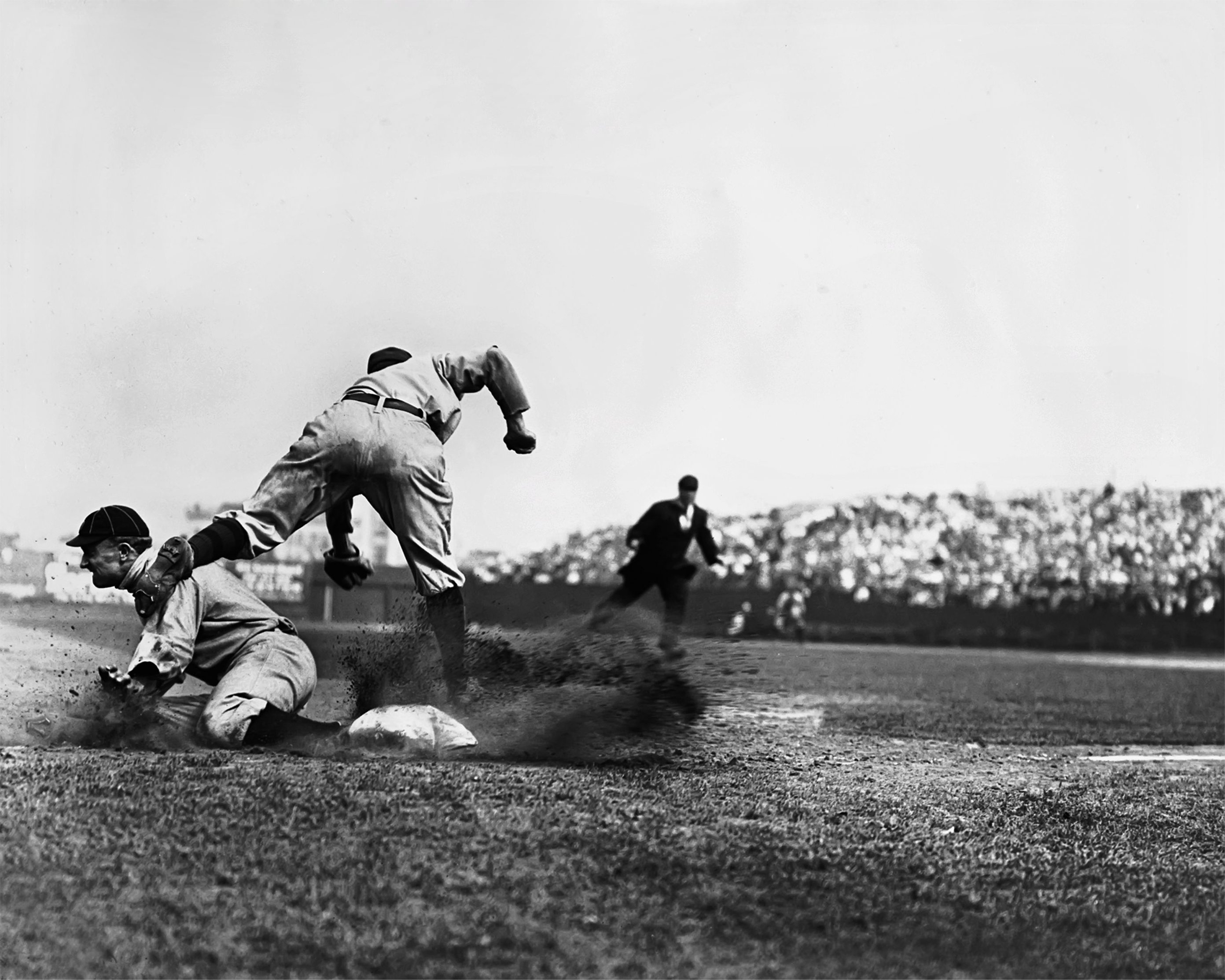
Cobb stealing third in 1909

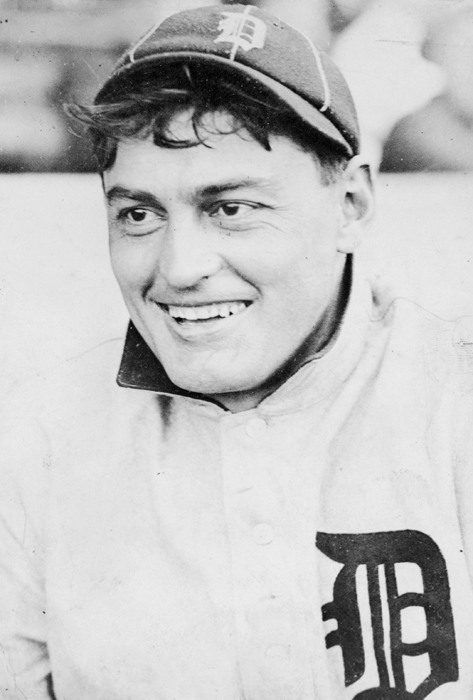
Boss Schmidt

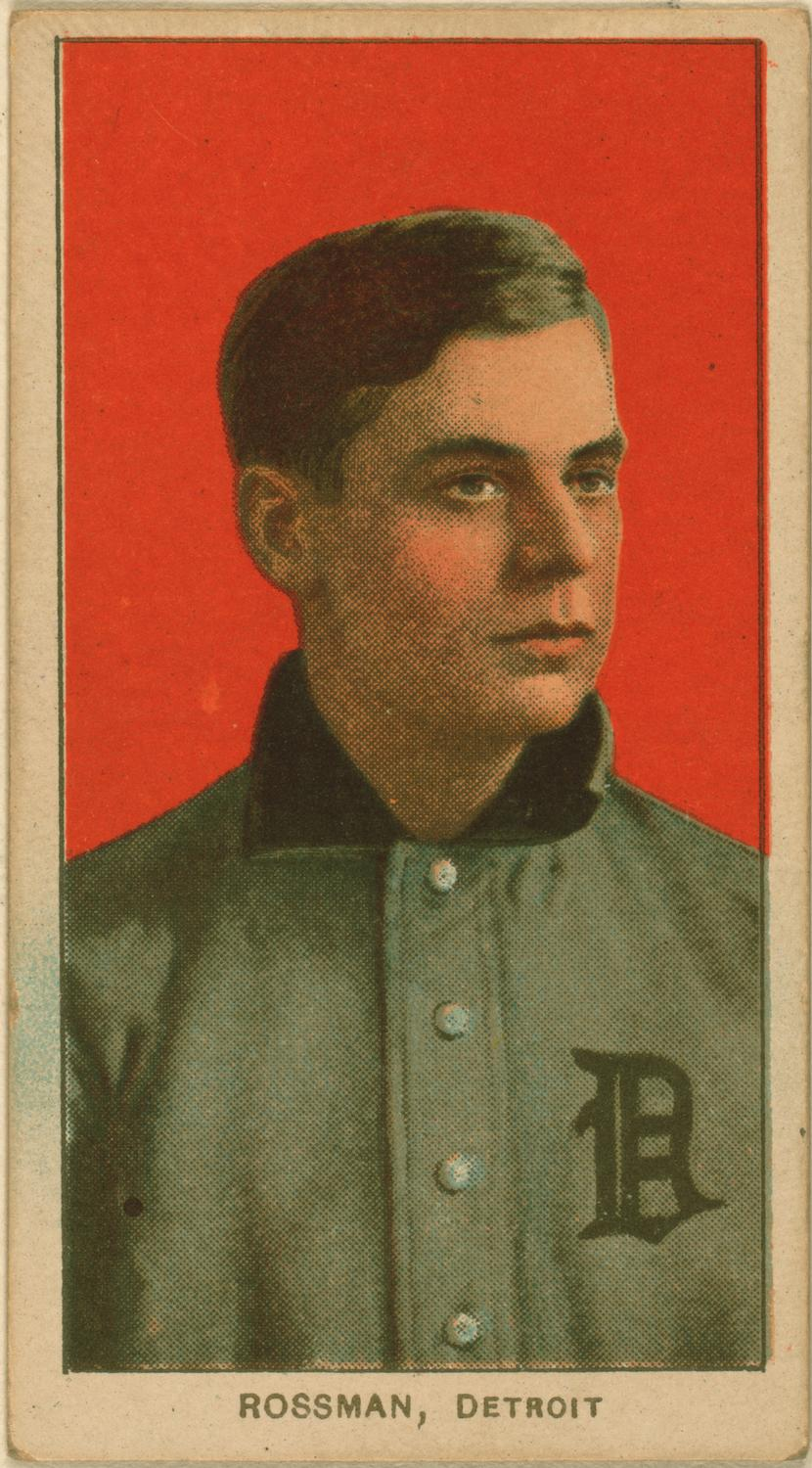
Claude Rossman

Bill Coughlin

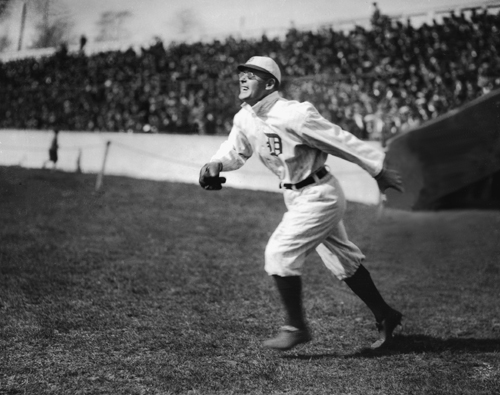
Sam Crawford pursues a fly ball

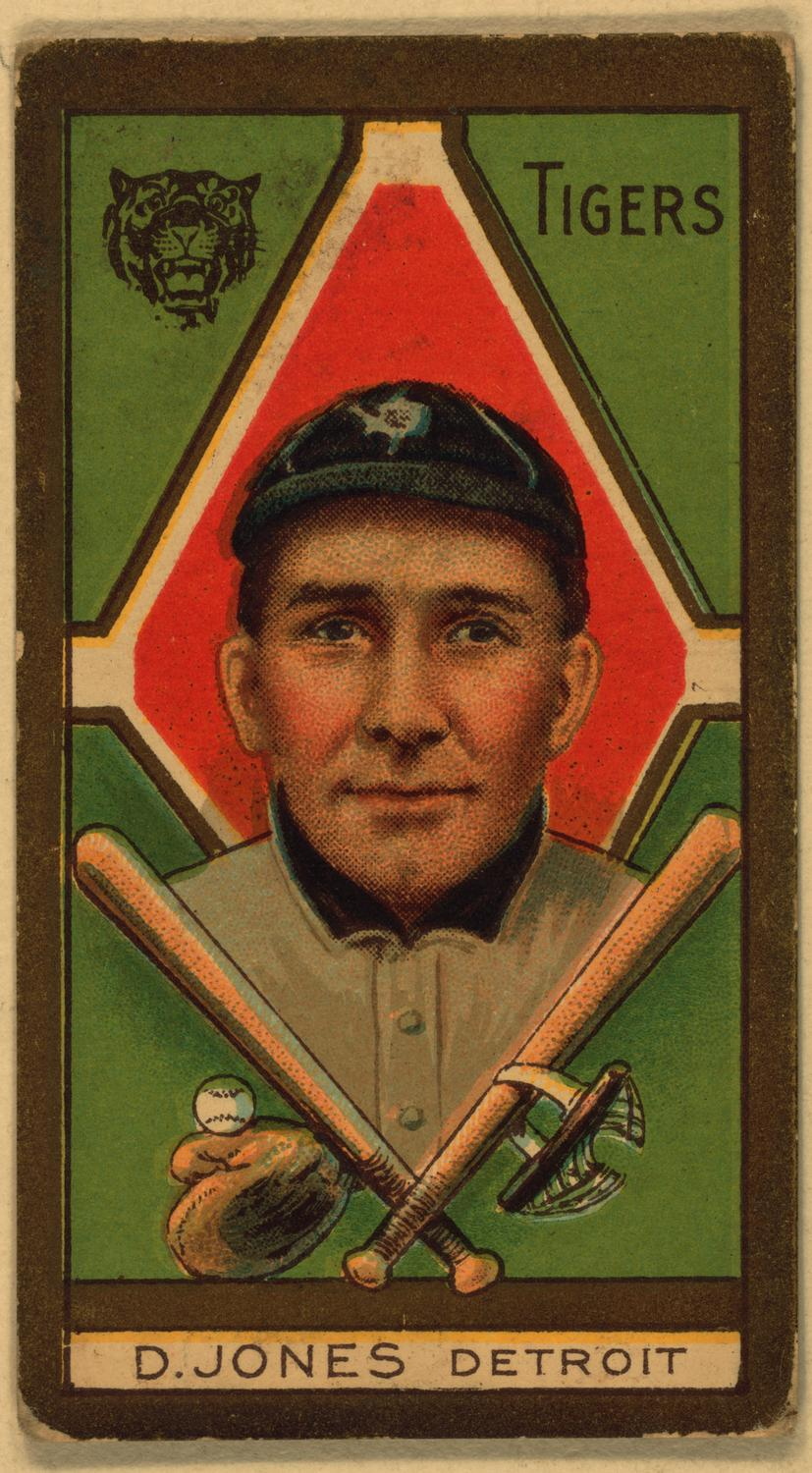
Davy Jones

==== Catchers: Boss Schmidt and Fred Payne ====
Catching duties were split between Boss Schmidt (67 games), Fred Payne (46 games), and Jimmy Archer (17 games).

Schmidt hit .244 in 1907. As a young man, Schmidt worked in the coal mines and was a skilled brawler who fought an exhibition match with the heavyweight champion, Jack Johnson. Schmidt also beat Ty Cobb in at least two fights. In the second fight, Schmidt knocked Cobb unconscious but admired Cobb's resiliency, and the two became friends until Schmidt's death in 1932. Schmidt never wore shinguards and could force nails into the floor with his bare fists.

==== Infield: Rossman, Downs, O'Leary, Coughlin, and Schaefer ====
First baseman Claude Rossman played for the Tigers from 1907 to 1909. In 1907, Rossman hit .277 and had 69 RBIs—third most on the team after Cobb and Crawford. Rossman had a peculiar emotional quirk where he sometimes froze and could not throw the ball when he became excited. Runners would lead off first to draw a throw from the pitcher, then run to second when Rossman froze. He was 28 when he played his last major league game and died at age 46 in a New York hospital for the insane where he had been a patient for several years.

Red Downs and Germany Schaefer platooned at the second base position for the Tigers in 1907 and 1908. Downs hit .219 in 1907 with 42 RBIs and 28 runs scored. In March 1932, Downs and another man robbed a jewelry store at the Biltmore Hotel in Los Angeles. Downs was convicted of first-degree robbery and sentenced to five years to life. He was paroled after 3½ years and returned to Iowa.

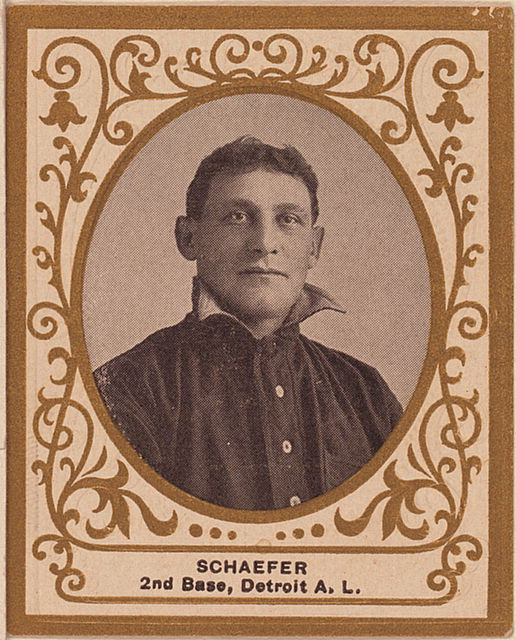
Germany Schaefer

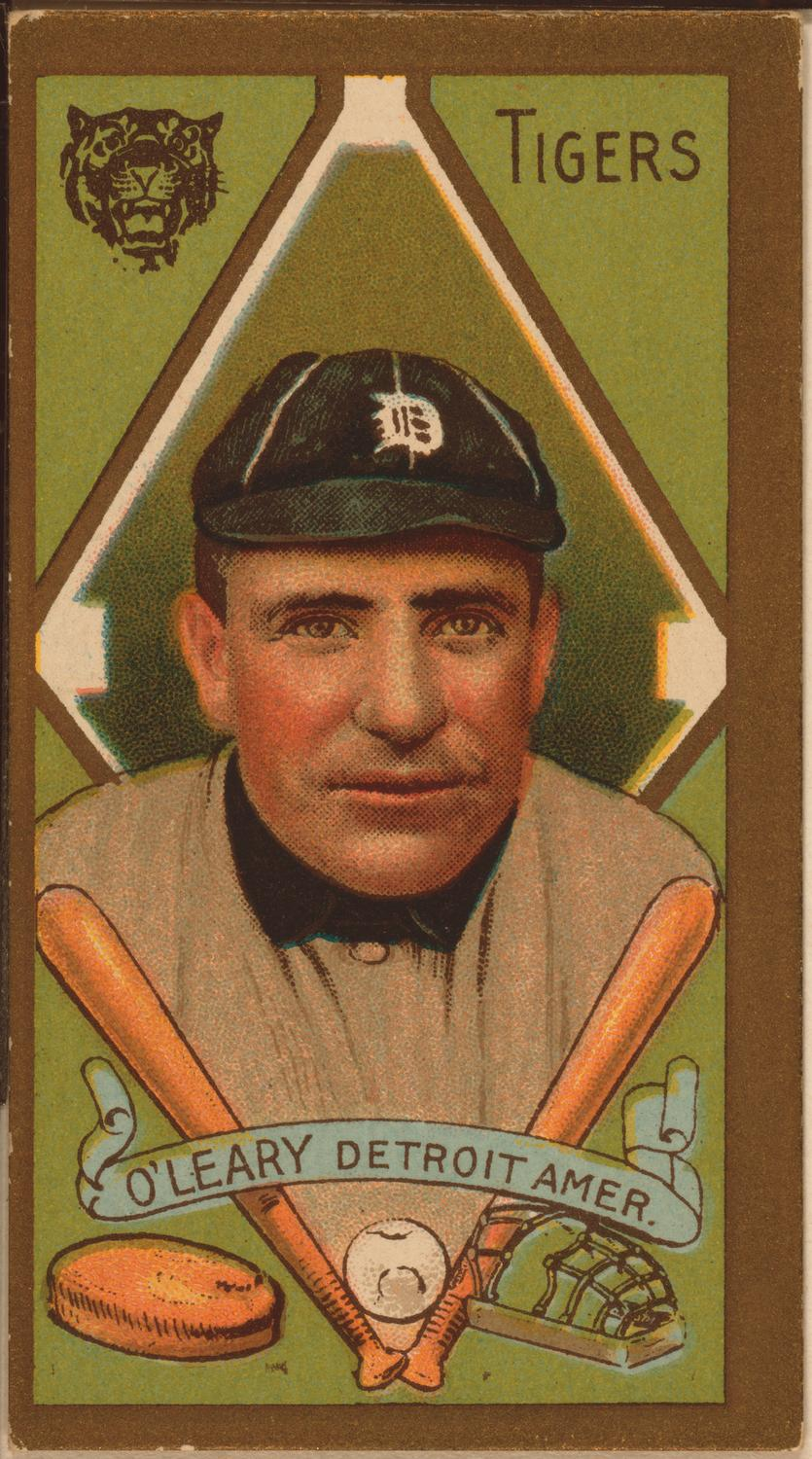
Charley O'Leary

Germany Schaefer was a backup second baseman and utility infielder for the 1907 Tigers. He played 74 games at second base, 18 at shortstop, and 14 at third base. Schaefer is remembered more for his antics than for his performance on the field, including trying to steal first base (from second base) and, coming to bat in the rain with a raincoat and boots (to persuade the umpire to call the games). Schaefer was a pioneer of baseball clowning, and his vaudeville act with teammate Charley O'Leary was inspiration for the MGM musical film "Take Me Out To The Ball Game" starring Gene Kelly and Frank Sinatra. In 1919, a little over a year after Schaefer played his last game, he died at age 42 of tuberculosis at the sanitarium in Saranac Lake, New York.

Charley O'Leary was Detroit's starting shortstop from 1904 to 1907. In 1907, he hit .241 and scored 61 runs. On September 30, 1934, O'Leary pinch hit for the St. Louis Browns at age 51 and became one of the oldest players to collect a hit and score a run.

Third baseman Bill Coughlin, known as "Scranton Bill", was named team captain in 1907 and 1908. He was a light-hitting defensive player, who never hit higher than .252 for the Tigers. His 232 putouts in 1901 is the 8th highest single season total in history by a major league third baseman. He is also one of the few MLB players to have stolen 2nd base, 3rd base and home in a single game. Coughlin was also the maestro of the hidden ball trick. Although no known comprehensive list is known to exist of all times when the hidden ball trick has worked, Coughlin reportedly pulled it off seven times (and at three different positions) – more than any other player in MLB history. In Game 2 of the 1907 World Series, Coughlin caught Jimmy Slagle with a hidden ball trick, the only one in World Series history.

==== Outfield: Cobb, Crawford and Jones ====
1907 was Ty Cobb's first season as an every-day starter. He won his first batting crown with a .350 average and led the American League in RBIs (119), slugging percentage (.468), hits (212), total bases (283), stolen bases (49), and runs created (106).

Right fielder Sam Crawford, known as "Wahoo Sam", was one of the greatest sluggers of the deadball era and still holds the major league records for triples in a career (309) and for inside-the-park home runs in a season (12) and a career (51). He finished his career with 2,961 hits and a .309 batting average. Crawford was among the AL leaders in hits, RBIs, extra base hits, slugging percentage, and total bases every year for twelve consecutive years from 1905 to 1915. In 1907, Crawford finished second in the AL in batting average (.323) behind Cobb, and led the league in runs scored (102) and extra base hits.

Davy Jones played for the Tigers from 1906 to 1912. With Cobb and Crawford solidly entrenched in the outfield, Jones was forced to battle for the third outfield spot with Matty McIntyre each year from 1906 to 1910. As a speedy leadoff man, he was a reliable run scorer with Cobb and Crawford following him in the lineup. Jones' speed also made him a fine outfielder, with tremendous range In 1907, he finished second in the AL with 101 runs. In his three World Series for the Tigers, Jones played in 18 games, had a .357 on-base percentage, scored 8 runs, and had a home run in the 1909 World Series against the Pittsburgh Pirates.

==== Pitching: Mullin, Killian, Siever, and Donovan ====
"Wild Bill" Donovan was the Tigers ace in 1907 with a 25–4 record—the best win percentage in Tigers' team history. On May 7, 1906, Donovan stole second base, third base, and home on the front end of a double steal and also hit a triple in the same game. In June 1923, Donovan died in a train wreck.

Ed Killian led the team (and was 2nd in the AL) with a 1.78 ERA and compiled a 25–13 record. As of the end of the 2009 season, Killian's career ERA of 2.38 is the 26th-best in MLB history. Killian also holds the record for fewest home runs allowed, giving up only 9 in his entire career. At one point, Killian pitched a record 1001 innings (from September 1903 – August 1907) without allowing a home run.

George Mullin won 20 games in 1907, but he also lost 20 games. His ERA of 2.59 was the highest among the four Detroit starting pitchers. Mullin holds the Detroit Tigers franchise record for innings pitched (in a career and in a season) and has the second most wins in the team's history. He also pitched the team's first no-hitter; had five 20-win seasons (including a league-leading 29 wins in 1909; twice hit over .310 as a batter); and ranks 7th in major league history for fielding assists by a pitcher.

The fourth Tiger starter was Ed Siever who had a 2.16 ERA in 1907 with a record of 18–11. Siever's Adjusted ERA+ of 191 for the 1902 Tigers is the second-best (after Hal Newhouser) in Tigers franchise history for a pitcher with more than 150 innings pitched. (See Detroit Tigers award winners and league leaders) Ironically, Siever won fewer games in 1902 than he did any other full season he played.

=== Player/Manager Hughie Jennings ===
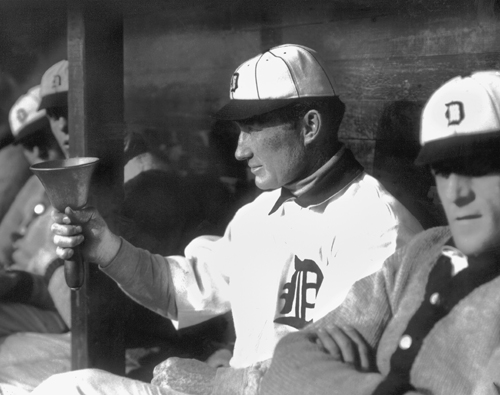
Hughie Jennings with horn in the Tigers dugout

Hughie "Ee-yah" Jennings led the Tigers to three consecutive American League pennants, in 1907–08–09. Jennings continued to manage the Tigers through the 1920 season, though his team never won another pennant. During his years as Detroit's manager, Jennings became famous for his antics, mostly in the third base coaching box, which variously included shouts of "Ee-Yah", and other whoops, whistles, horns, gyrations, jigs, and grass-plucking. The "Ee-Yah" whoop became his trademark and was accompanied with waves of both arms over his head and a sharp raising of his right knee. In 1907, he was suspended for taunting opponents with a tin whistle. The "Ee-Yah" shouts continued and became such a trademark that Jennings became known as Hughie "Ee-Yah" Jennings, and Detroit fans would shout "Ee-Yah" when Jennings would appear on the field. (See also Jack Smile, Ee-yah: The Life And Times Of Hughie Jennings, Baseball Hall Of Famer)

According to Connie Mack (a fellow baseball manager), Jennings was one of the three greatest managers in history, along with John McGraw and Joe McCarthy.

=== Season highlights ===
- September 27: The Tigers beat the A's, 5–4‚ to take over first place.
- September 30: The Tigers and A's, battling for the pennant, play to a 17-inning 9–9 tie in one of the most memorable games of the 1907 season. In the first game of a planned double header‚ the A's got off to a 7–1 lead against "Wild Bill" Donovan. The Tigers came back to tie the game, 8–8, against Rube Waddell, on a two-run home run by Ty Cobb. Both teams scored once in the 11th, and an umpire's ruling cost Philadelphia the game in the 14th inning. Harry Davis hit a long fly. Detroit outfielder Sam Crawford went to the crowd's edge‚ and a policeman stood up and moved‚ either to interfere or to get out of the way. Home plate umpire Silk O'Loughlin ruled there was no interference‚ then reversed his ruling when base umpire Tom Connolly offered a different opinion. The game was called because of darkness in the 17th‚ a 9–9 tie. The Tigers‚ in first place‚ left for Washington where they won four games.
- October 2: The Tigers swept a double header against Washington‚ winning 9–5 and 10–2. Ty Cobb got his 200th hit.

=== Season standings ===
American League
Team	W	L	Pct.	GB	Home	Road
Detroit Tigers	92	58	.613	—	50‍–‍27	42‍–‍31
Philadelphia Athletics	88	57	.607	1½	50‍–‍20	38‍–‍37
Chicago White Sox	87	64	.576	5½	48‍–‍29	39‍–‍35
Cleveland Naps	85	67	.559	8	46‍–‍31	39‍–‍36
New York Highlanders	70	78	.473	21	32‍–‍41	38‍–‍37
St. Louis Browns	69	83	.454	24	36‍–‍40	33‍–‍43
Boston Americans	59	90	.396	32½	34‍–‍41	25‍–‍49
Washington Senators	49	102	.325	43½	26‍–‍48	23‍–‍54

=== Record vs. opponents ===
1907 American League record Sources:
Team	BOS	CWS	CLE	DET	NYH	PHA	SLB	WSH
Boston	—	10–11–3	8–13	6–16	8–12–1	8–14–2	10–12	9–12
Chicago	11–10–3	—	10–11–1	13–9–1	12–10	10–12–1	16–6	15–6
Cleveland	13–8	11–10–1	—	11–11–1	15–7	8–14	12–10–2	15–7–2
Detroit	16–6	9–13–1	11–11–1	—	13–8	11–8–1	14–8	18–4
New York	12–8–1	10–12	7–15	8–13	—	10–9–1	8–14–1	15–7–1
Philadelphia	14–8–2	12–10–1	14–8	8–11–1	9–10–1	—	14–6	17–4
St. Louis	12–10	6–16	10–12–2	8–14	14–8–1	6–14	—	13–9
Washington	12–9	6–15	7–15–2	4–18	7–15–1	4–17	9–13	—

=== Roster ===
1907 Detroit Tigers
Roster
Pitchers: Bill Donovan; John Eubank; Elijah Jones; Ed Killian; Herm Malloy; George Mullin; Ed Siever; Ed Willett	Catchers: Jimmy Archer; Tex Erwin; Fred Payne; Boss Schmidt; Infielders: Bill Coughlin; Red Downs; Hughie Jennings; Bobby Lowe; Charley O'Leary; Claude Rossman; Germany Schaefer	Outfielders: Ty Cobb; Sam Crawford; Davy Jones; Red Killefer; Matty McIntyre	Manager: Hughie Jennings

== Player stats ==
= Indicates team leader

=== Batting ===
==== Starters by position ====
Note: Pos = Position; G = Games played; AB = At bats; H = Hits; Avg. = Batting average; HR = Home runs; RBI = Runs batted in

Pos	Player	G	AB	H	Avg.	HR	RBI
C	Boss Schmidt	104	349	85	.244	0	23
1B	Claude Rossman	153	571	158	.277	0	69
2B	Red Downs	105	374	82	.219	1	42
3B	Bill Coughlin	134	519	126	.243	0	46
SS	Charley O'Leary	139	465	112	.241	0	34
OF	Ty Cobb	150	605	212	.350	5	119
OF	Sam Crawford	144	582	188	.323	4	81
OF	Davy Jones	126	491	134	.273	0	34

==== Other batters ====
Note: G = Games played; AB = At bats; H = Hits; Avg. = Batting average; HR = Home runs; RBI = Runs batted in

Player	G	AB	H	Avg.	HR	RBI
Germany Schaefer	109	372	96	.258	1	32
Fred Payne	53	169	28	.166	0	14
Matty McIntyre	20	81	23	.284	0	9
Jimmy Archer	18	42	5	.119	0	0
Bobby Lowe	17	37	9	.243	0	5
Tex Erwin	4	5	1	.200	0	1
Hughie Jennings	1	4	1	.250	0	0
Red Killefer	1	4	0	.000	0	0

Note: pitchers' batting statistics not included

=== Pitching ===
==== Starting pitchers ====
Note: G = Games pitched; IP = Innings pitched; W = Wins; L = Losses; ERA = Earned run average; SO = Strikeouts

Player	G	IP	W	L	ERA	SO
George Mullin	46	357.1	20	20	2.59	146
Ed Killian	41	314.0	25	13	1.78	96
Ed Siever	39	274.2	18	11	2.16	88
Bill Donovan	32	271.0	25	4	2.19	123
Herm Malloy	1	8.0	0	1	5.63	6

==== Other pitchers ====
Note: G = Games pitched; IP = Innings pitched; W = Wins; L = Losses; ERA = Earned run average; SO = Strikeouts

Player	G	IP	W	L	ERA	SO
John Eubank	15	81.0	3	3	2.67	17
Ed Willett	10	48.2	1	5	3.70	27
Elijah Jones	4	16.0	0	1	5.06	9

== Awards and honors ==
=== Players ranking among top 100 all time at position ===
The following members of the 1909 Detroit Tigers are among the Top 100 of all time at their position, as ranked by The New Bill James Historical Baseball Abstract in 2001:

- Ty Cobb: 2nd best center fielder of all time
- Sam Crawford: 10th best right fielder of all time

== World Series ==
=== World Series summary ===
In the 1907 World Series, the Chicago Cubs beat the Tigers 4 games to none (with one tie). With pitching dominance over the Tigers and Cobb, the Cubs allowed only three runs in the four games they won, while stealing 18 bases off the rattled Tigers.

In Game 1, Tigers pitcher Bill Donovan struck out twelve Cubs in 12 innings. The Tigers scored three runs, in part due to three Chicago errors, in the 8th inning and held a 3–1 lead going into the bottom of the 9th. The Cubs loaded the bases on a single, walk and infield error with one out. Detroit conceded a run on a ground ball for the second out and Cub player-manager Frank Chance then used pinch-hitter Del Howard to bat for Joe Tinker. Howard struck out against "Wild" Bill Donovan (25–4 in the regular season) but the ball got away from catcher Boss Schmidt, allowing Harry Steinfeldt to score the tying run. Donovan got the next batter but the damage to Detroit has been done. The teams then played three scoreless innings before the game was called on account of darkness and declared a tie, a first for the World Series.

In Game 2, George Mullin, a 20-game winner and loser for Detroit in 1907 and who had walked over 100 batters in each of his last five seasons, issues a bases-loaded walk in the 2nd inning to tie the game at 1–1. Chicago scored two more in the 4th on a single, sacrifice bunt, RBI single, stolen base and double to take a 3–1 lead.

In Game 3, Cubs pitcher Ed Reulbach scattered six hits as Chicago jumped on Tiger starter Ed Siever for four runs on seven hits in only four innings. Johnny Evers had three hits, including two doubles, as the Cubs took a 2–0 lead in the series.

In Game 4, Detroit held a 1–0 lead on a triple by Ty Cobb and an RBI single by Claude Rossman before a rain delay in the 5th inning. When play resumed, Chicago baserunners reached via an error and a walk. After Joe Tinker sacrificed, pitcher Orval Overall drove both runners home on a single to right field. The Cubs scored three more in the 7th without hitting the ball out of the infield on four bunts (two for hits) and two ground balls.

In Game 5, Chicago wrapped up the series with a 2–0 victory as Mordecai Brown pitched a seven-hit shutout. The Cubs scored a run in the first inning on a walk, stolen base and RBI single by Harry Steinfeldt and scored again in the 2nd on an error, a single, a double-steal and a ground ball out to drive in the final run. Detroit had runners on 2nd and 3rd with one out in the 4th inning, but could not score and never seriously threatened after that.

=== Postseason player stats ===
==== Batting ====
Note: G = Games played; AB = At bats; H = Hits; Avg. = Batting average; HR = Home runs; RBI = Runs batted in

Player	G	AB	H	Avg.	HR	RBI
Ty Cobb	5	20	4	.200	0	0
Bill Coughlin	5	20	5	.250	0	0
Sam Crawford	5	21	5	.238	0	3
Davy Jones	5	17	6	.353	0	0
Charley O'Leary	5	17	1	.059	0	0
Claude Rossman	5	19	9	.474	0	2
Germany Schaefer	5	21	3	.143	0	0
Boss Schmidt	4	12	2	.167	0	0

==== Pitching ====
Note: G = Games pitched; IP = Innings pitched; W = Wins; L = Losses; ERA = Earned run average; SO = Strikeouts

Player	G	IP	W	L	ERA	SO
Bill Donovan	2	21	0	1	1.71	16
George Mullin	2	17	0	2	2.12	8
Ed Killian	1	4	0	0	2.25	1
Ed Siever	1	4	0	1	4.50	1
