= Bill Coughlin =

American baseball player (1878–1943)

- Third baseman
- Born: July 12, 1878; Scranton, Pennsylvania, U.S.
- Died: May 7, 1943 (aged 64); Scranton, Pennsylvania, U.S.
- Batted: Right Threw: Right

MLB debut
- August 9, 1899, for the Washington Senators

Last MLB appearance
- September 23, 1908, for the Detroit Tigers

MLB statistics
- Batting average: .252
- Hits: 972
- Runs batted in: 380
- Stolen bases: 159
- Stats at Baseball Reference

Teams
- Washington Senators (NL) (1899); Washington Senators (AL) (1901–1904); Detroit Tigers (1904–1908)

William Paul Coughlin (July 12, 1878 – May 7, 1943), nicknamed "Scranton Bill", was an American Major League Baseball third baseman for the Washington Senators (1901–1904) and Detroit Tigers (1904–1908). Coughlin spent his entire adult life (1899–1943) playing and coaching baseball, as a major league player, minor league coach, and spending his last 23 years as the head baseball coach at Lafayette College, in Easton, Pennsylvania.

== Playing career ==
Born in Scranton, Pennsylvania, and nicknamed "Scranton Bill" (also "Rowdy Bill"), Coughlin played nine seasons in the major leagues. Coughlin had a career batting average of .252 with 159 stolen bases and 123 sacrifice hits, including 36 sacrifice hits in 1906 (2nd best in the American League). Coughlin was twice among the AL leaders in home runs during the dead-ball era, with 6 each year in 1901 and 1902.

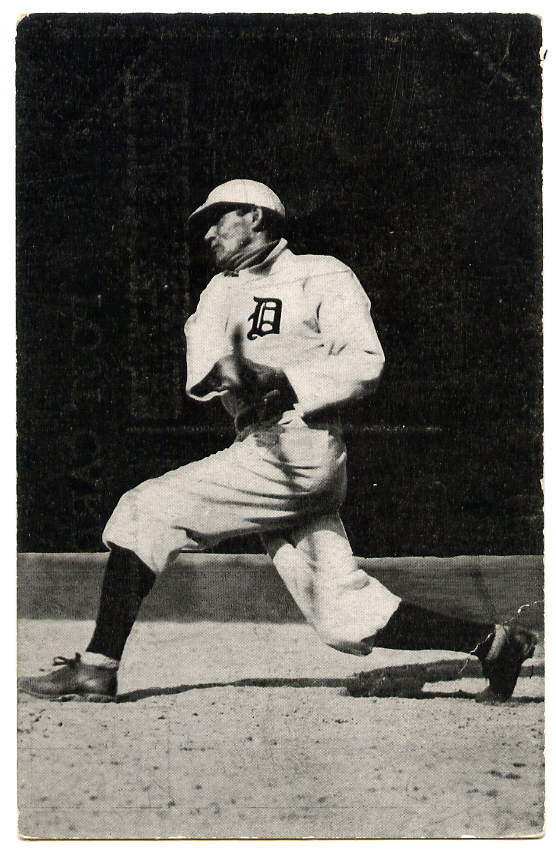
Bill Coughlin, Dietsche Baseball Card, 1907

Coughlin began his major league baseball career with Washington's National League club in 1899 but played in only 6 games. Two years later, he joined the newly formed Washington Senators for their inaugural season in the American League. He played with the Senators from 1901 to 1905.

Coughlin's best year was 1902, when he had career highs in batting average (.301), on-base percentage (.348), slugging percentage (.414), hits (141), doubles (27), home runs (6), and RBIs (71).

Coughlin was also a strong fielder at 3rd base. He led the American League in putouts by a third baseman in 1901 with 232 (only 11 short of Willie Kamm's AL record of 243) and again in 1906 with 188. Over his career, he had 1,269 putouts at third base. His 232 putouts in 1901 is the 8th highest single season total in history by a major league third baseman.

Coughlin was purchased by the Tigers on July 31, 1904, for $8,000. From that point through the 1908 season, Coughlin was Detroit's starting third baseman. He was a team leader and was named team captain in the 1907 and 1908 seasons. Coughlin was the captain for the Tigers' first two American League pennant winners in 1907 and 1908. Coughlin hit .258 in the 1907 and 1908 World Series but did not score. The Tigers lost both Series to the Chicago Cubs.

Coughlin was a good baserunner. He had 159 stolen bases, including 31 in 1906. He is one of the few MLB players to have stolen 2nd base, 3rd base and home in a single game. He accomplished the feat in June 1906 against the Washington Senators.

Coughlin was a light-hitting defensive player, which was common for third basemen of that era. In four years as the Tigers regular third baseman, Scranton Bill never hit higher than .252, and he slugged over .300 just once.

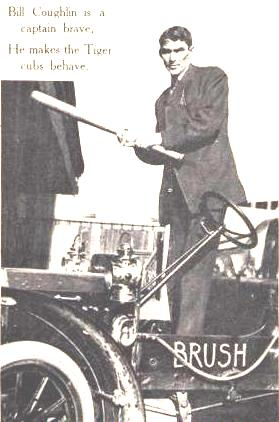
Bill Coughlin, Captain of the 1907 Tigers

== Maestro of the hidden ball trick ==
The Detroit Tigers teams of 1906–1908, on which Coughlin played, were among the most colorful groups in baseball history, with the flying spikes of Ty Cobb, on-field antics from Germany Schaefer and Charley O'Leary (who toured as a vaudeville act in the off-season), fisticuffs from catcher Boss Schmidt, and the shouts, gyrations, and jigs of Hughie "Ee-Yah" Jennings from the third base coaching box.

Coughlin's role in this colorful bunch was as the maestro of the hidden ball trick. The hidden ball trick is a play in which the runner is deceived about the location of the ball, in an effort to tag him out. Although no known comprehensive list is known to exist of all times when the hidden ball trick has worked, Coughlin reportedly pulled it off seven times (and at three different positions) -- more than any other player in MLB history. He pulled it off on May 12, 1905, against Hobe Ferris of the Boston Red Sox. He did it again on September 3, 1906, catching George Stone in the first inning. In Game 2 of the 1907 World Series, Coughlin caught Jimmy Slagle with a hidden ball trick, the only one in World Series history.

== Later years ==
After leaving Major League Baseball, Coughlin became a baseball coach in the minor leagues and then at Lafayette College in Easton, Pennsylvania. From 1909 to 1917, he was a minor league manager for the Williamsport Millionaires (1909–1910), Allentown (1912–1913), and Scranton Miners (1914–1917). He was a player-manager until 1914.

In 1919, Coughlin was involved in the occupation of Germany after World War I. Coughlin conceived and operated a school for umpires run by the Knights of Columbus in occupied Coblenz, Germany. Coughlin taught the umpire candidates to officiate baseball games for the occupying servicemen. Coughlin taught his umpires to play "The Star Spangled Banner" if fights erupted among the players, causing "rocks held ready to avenge an unpopular decision" to fall from "reverent hands." (Harold Seymour and Dorothy Seymour Mills, Baseball: The People's Game (Oxford Univ. Press 1990), p. 347)

After the war, Coughlin became the head baseball coach at Lafayette College, a post he held from 1920 to 1943. He had only one losing season in his 23 seasons at Lafayette. His coaching record at Lafayette was 273-134, a .675 winning percentage. His teams were 52-13 against rival Lehigh and 31-8 against Rutgers. Under Coughlin, the Lafayette baseball program became one of the best in the country. Coughlin was inducted into the Helms Foundation College Baseball Hall of Fame in 1954 and the Lafayette College Hall of Fame in 1977.

Coughlin died in Scranton, Pennsylvania, in 1943 at age 64.

== See also ==
- List of Major League Baseball career stolen bases leaders
