= Ed Killian =

American baseball player (1876–1928)

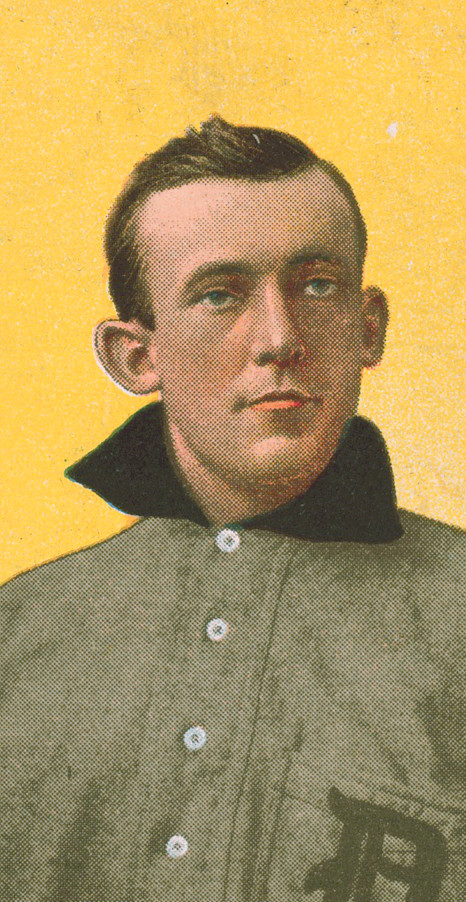
- Killian on a 1909 tobacco card
- Pitcher
- Born: November 12, 1876; Racine, Wisconsin, U.S.
- Died: July 18, 1928 (aged 51); Detroit, Michigan, U.S.
- Batted: Left Threw: Left

MLB debut
- August 25, 1903, for the Cleveland Naps

Last MLB appearance
- July 15, 1910, for the Detroit Tigers

MLB statistics
- Win–loss record: 103–78
- Earned run average: 2.38
- Strikeouts: 516
- Stats at Baseball Reference

Teams
- Cleveland Naps (1903); Detroit Tigers (1904–1910)

Edwin Henry Killian (November 12, 1876 – July 18, 1928), nicknamed "Twilight Ed" and the "Twilight Twirler", was an American left-handed pitcher in Major League Baseball.

Killian played professional baseball from 1902 to 1912, including seven seasons with the Detroit Tigers from 1904 to 1910. He recorded an MLB won-loss record of 103–78 for a winning percentage of .569. Twice a 20-game winner (including a 25–13 season in 1907), Killian's career earned run average (ERA) of 2.38 ranks 26th best in major league history. He also helped lead the Tigers to three consecutive American League pennants from 1907 to 1909, including winning both games of a doubleheader on September 30, 1909, to clinch the third pennant. As a hitter, Killian posted a .209 batting average (127-for-609) with 56 runs, 52 runs batted in and 16 bases on balls.

Killian allowed only nine home runs during his major league career. He holds the major league record for the longest streak without allowing a home run – a streak of 1,001 innings that ran from September 19, 1903, to August 7, 1907.

Killian played in the minor leagues for the Rockford Red Sox of the Three-I League (1902–1903) and the Toronto Maple Leafs of the International League (1910–1911).

== Early years ==
Killian was born in 1876 in Racine, Wisconsin. He did not begin playing professional baseball until he was in his mid-20s. He played independent baseball in Racine and worked in a planing mill where he was "receiving $1.25 per day for ten hours of hard manual labor."

== Professional baseball career ==
=== Rockford and Cleveland (1902–03) ===
Killian began playing professional baseball in the spring of 1902 with the Rockford Red Sox of the Three-I League for a salary of $75 per month. He started 38 games at Rockford and compiled a 21-15 record with a 2.80 earned run average (ERA). Killian returned to Rockford in 1903 and compiled a 14-10 record in 24 games.

In August 1903, Killian was sold by the Rockford team to the Cleveland Naps. Killian made his major league debut with Cleveland on August 25, 1903. He appeared in nine games in the closing weeks of the 1903 season, compiling a 3-4 record with a 2.48 ERA.

=== Detroit Tigers (1904–10) ===
==== The "twilight twirler" ====
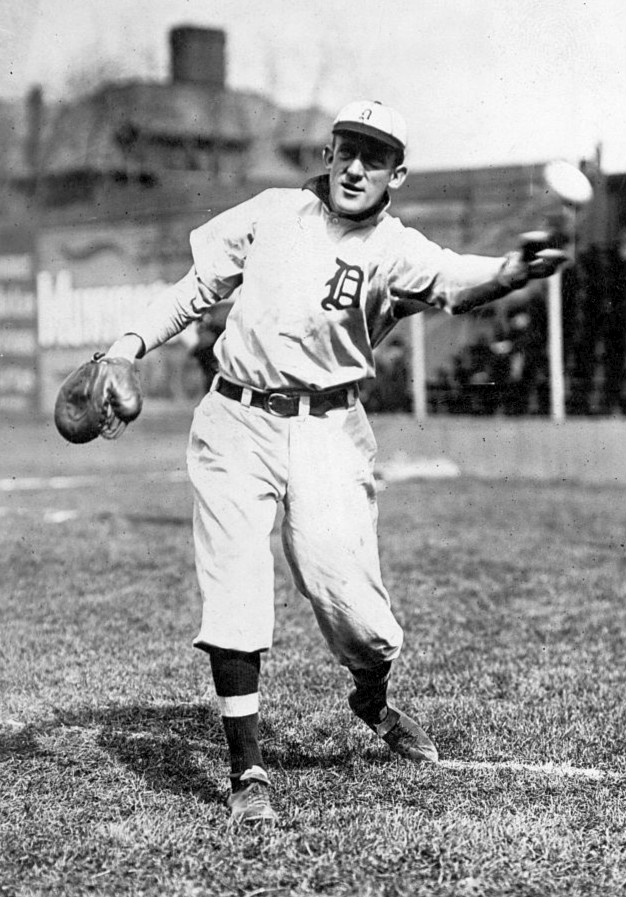
Killian in 1908

In January 1904, Killian was traded by the Naps with Jesse Stovall to the Detroit Tigers for Billy Lush. Killian pitched the rest of his major league career with the Tigers. In 1904, Killian had 32 complete games and a 2.44 ERA in 331 innings, but lost 20 games. The 1904 Tigers team (one year before the arrival of Ty Cobb) was a weak-hitting group that compiled a .231 team batting average and finished in seventh place.

As proof that his 1904 win–loss record was not indicative of his talents, Killian battled Cy Young in one of the most remarkable pitching duels in history on May 11, 1904. Young and Killian each pitched 14 scoreless innings, before the Red Sox scored a run in the 15th inning, winning 1–0. Early in his career with the Tigers, Killian received the nicknames "Twilight Ed" and the "Twilight Twirler" after pitching multiple extra-inning games that extended into the twilight hours.

In 1905, Killian reduced his ERA further to 2.27. He started 37 games and completed 33. He wound up with a 23–14 record, the third best win total in the American League and fourth best in complete games. His eight shutouts in 1905 was tops in the American League.

==== Suspension in 1906 ====
Killian started only 16 games in 1906 and finished 10–6 with a 3.43 ERA. He missed several weeks of the season in August and September. He was suspended after a series of incidents in which he destroyed a telephone and various articles of furniture in the clubhouse in a rage, showed up on multiple occasions not "in condition to play ball", and trouble under the grandstand in which officers had to be called to prevent Killian from going on the field. During the suspension, Killian left Detroit and pitched semipro ball in Chicago (for $100 per game) and did not pitch in a game for the Tigers until September 19.

==== 1,001 innings without a home run ====
After surrendering a home run to Freddy Parent on September 19, 1903, Killian would not surrender another home run until August 7, 1907 when Socks Seybold ended the streak, a span of nearly four years and 1,001 innings. In his entire career, he allowed only nine home runs – an average of one home run every 178 innings. According to BaseballLibrary.com, he was "the hardest pitcher to homer against in ML history." He reportedly used a "sinkerball" to induce batters to hit groundballs.

==== Three consecutive American League pennants ====
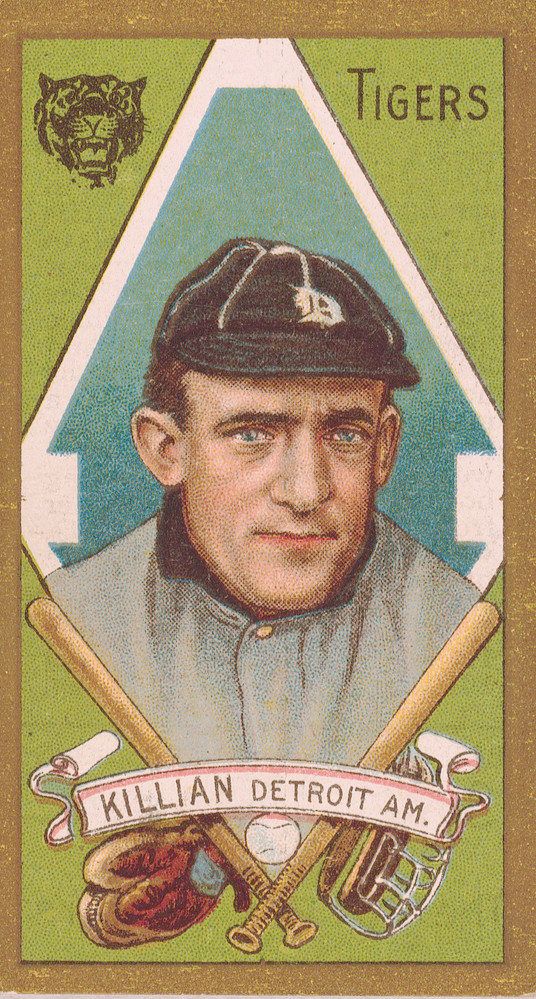
1911 tobacco card

In 1907, Killian had the best season of his career. He started 41 games and compiled a 25–13 record with a 1.78 ERA. His ERA was 81 points lower than the league average of 2.59. He ranked among the American League's leaders with his 1.78 ERA (second), 25 wins (third), 29 complete games (sixth), and 1,270 batters faced (sixth). Killian also excelled as a batter in 1907, compiling a .320 batting average and .410 slugging percentage. His batting average was 73 points higher than the league average of .247.

Killian's 8.0 wins above replacement (WAR) in 1907 was the highest of any player in the American League at any position, higher even than teammate Ty Cobb. Only Honus Wagner in the National League had a higher WAR rating at 9.0.

Killian's performance helped lead the 1907 Tigers to their first American League pennant and was one of the best pitching performances in the club's history. Unfortunately, Killian's arm was worn out for the post-season, and he pitched only four innings in relief with no decision during the 1907 World Series against the Chicago Cubs.

In 1908, Killian appeared in 27 games and compiled a 12-9 record and 2.99 ERA as the Tigers won their second consecutive pennant. He also started one game in the 1908 World Series, giving up five hits, three walks, and three earned runs in 2 1/3 innings.

In 1909, Killian did not appear in his first game until mid-May. He ultimately appeared in 25 games and compiled an 11-9 record with a 1.71 ERA. On September 30, 1909, he pitched both games of a doubleheader against Boston and won both games to help the Tigers clinch their third consecutive American League pennant. He was pitching a no-hitter in the first game until the eighth inning and was then removed after the eighth inning to rest up for the second game. The Tigers won the first game by a 5-0 score. In the second game, Killian pitched a complete game (bringing his day's total to 17 innings), and the Tigers won by an 8-3 score.

==== Final season ====
In 1910, Killian appeared in only 11 games for the Tigers, compiling a 4-3 record with a 3.04 ERA. He appeared in his final major league game on July 15, 1910. After seven seasons in a Detroit uniform, he was sold to the Toronto Maple Leafs of the International League on August 2, 1910. At the time of his release, the Detroit Free Press wrote:

"Gameness has been one of Killian's chief assets. He has the reputation of being as nervy a pitcher as ever stepped to the slab and repeatedly won games when his arm was out of condition through sheer pluck. Killian also is the possessor of a great pitching head, studying the opposing batsmen and preying upon their weaknesses. For a slabman, he hits well and also is a good fielder."

=== Toronto Maple Leafs (1910–11) ===
In 1910 and 1911, Killian played for the Toronto Maple Leafs of the Eastern League. He compiled a 2-6 record with a 1.96 ERA in 1910 and a 4-3 record and 3.51 ERA in 1911.

== Family and later years ==
Killian was married to Lottie McAfee in June 1908 at Alpena, Michigan. She died in 1920, and he was subsequently married to Millie Ann Moore in 1920. He had no children. In the last years of his life, he worked at an automobile factory in Detroit.

In 1928, Killian died at his home in Detroit at age 51 after battling cancer for several months.

== See also ==
- List of Major League Baseball career ERA leaders
- List of Major League Baseball annual shutout leaders
- List of Major League Baseball individual streaks
