= Elijah Jones =

Elijah Jones may refer to:

- Elijah Jones (baseball) (1882–1943), American baseball pitcher
- Elijah Jones (American football) (born 2000), American football cornerback
