= Red Downs =

American baseball player (1883–1939)

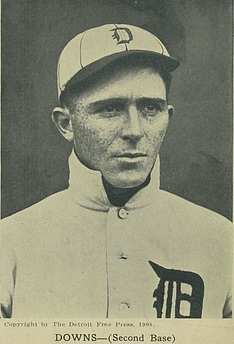
- Downs in 1908
- Second baseman
- Born: August 23, 1883; Neola, Iowa, U.S.
- Died: October 19, 1939 (aged 56); Council Bluffs, Iowa, U.S.
- Batted: Right Threw: Right

MLB debut
- May 2, 1907, for the Detroit Tigers

Last MLB appearance
- September 30, 1912, for the Chicago Cubs

MLB statistics
- Batting average: .227
- Hits: 179
- Runs batted in: 94
- Stats at Baseball Reference

Teams
- Detroit Tigers (1907–1908); Brooklyn Dodgers (1912); Chicago Cubs (1912)

Career highlights and awards
- 1907 American League Championship; 1908 American League Championship

Jerome Willis "Red" Downs (August 23, 1883 – October 19, 1939) was an American Major League Baseball player, who gained notoriety later in life as an armed robber during the Great Depression.

== Early life and MLB career ==
Downs was born and raised in Neola, Iowa, a small town with a town ball baseball team. Downs played on the Neola team, known as the Neola Erins, as a young man. Between 1903 and 1906, he played minor league baseball on teams in Fort Scott, Kansas (Fort Scott Giants), Guthrie, Oklahoma (Guthrie Senators) and Topeka, Kansas (Topeka White Sox]). In 1906, he led the Western Association with 8 home runs, leading to his signing with the Detroit Tigers. Downs had a batting average of .227 in 241 major league games. Downs and Germany Schaefer platooned at the second base position for the Tigers in 1907 and 1908. Detroit won the American League pennant in both of Downs' years with the team. He played in two games in the 1908 World Series, getting one hit (a double) in 6 at-bats for a .167 batting average. Downs also scored a run and had an RBI in the 1908 World Series.

The Chicago White Sox acquired Downs after the 1908 season, but he got off the team train while on the way to spring training and did not reboard. Downs played with the minor-league Minneapolis Millers for most of the 1909, and then got another shot at the major leagues with the Washington Senators, but he declined to take the long trip east to play in only a few games. He played in 1910 and 1911 with the Columbus Senators. The Brooklyn Dodgers drafted Downs after the 1911 season, but he was released after only 9 games in 1912. He was then picked up by the Chicago Cubs, where he took Joe Tinker's spot at shortstop. Sporting Life, in August 1912, reported that "Jerry Downs is proving a good substitute for Johnny Evers. The lad can bat some."

== Return to minors ==
From 1913 to 1918, Downs played for the San Francisco Seals in the Pacific Coast League, including the 1915 PCL championship team. Downs also served as the Seals' manager at the end of the 1917 season, leading the team to another PCL pennant. On July 1, 1918, Downs resigned from the Seals and signed with the Los Angeles Angels, helping the Angels win the 1918 PCL pennant.

"Liquor has put me out for the third time", said Downs to a police detective upon his arrest for armed robbery in 1932. "First, it caused me to lose a place in the big league, where I might, by this time, have been a successful manager. The second time it threw me out of the Coast League. And now it's got me into this jam."

— Red Downs,
Los Angeles Times newspaper article, March 29, 1932

== Later years ==
In 1924, Downs helped organize the Professional Ball Players of America. The organization carried on for a number of years, assisting ill and needy former ballplayers, and Downs served as a Director of the organization through 1925.

As the Great Depression hit, Downs fell on hard times. In March 1932, Downs and another man robbed a jewelry store at the Biltmore Hotel in Los Angeles. Downs was convicted of first-degree robbery and sentenced to five years to life. He was paroled after 3 1/2 years and returned to Iowa. Downs died of cirrhosis of the liver in Council Bluffs, Iowa, in 1939 at age 56. He is buried at the Neola Township Cemetery in Neola, Iowa.
