= Red Killefer =

American baseball player (1885–1958)

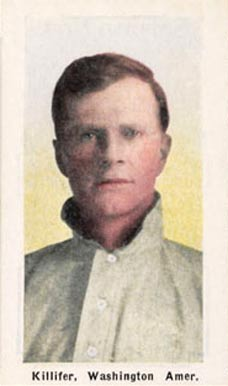
- Outfielder
- Born: April 13, 1885; Bloomingdale, Michigan, U.S.
- Died: September 4, 1958 (aged 73); Los Angeles, California, U.S.
- Batted: Right Threw: Right

MLB debut
- September 16, 1907, for the Detroit Tigers

Last MLB appearance
- August 19, 1916, for the New York Giants

MLB statistics
- Batting average: .248
- Home runs: 3
- Runs batted in: 116
- Stats at Baseball Reference

Teams
- Detroit Tigers (1907–1909); Washington Senators (1909–1910); Cincinnati Reds (1914–1916); New York Giants (1916)

Wade Hampton "Red" Killefer (April 13, 1885 – September 4, 1958) was an American outfielder and second baseman in Major League Baseball who played seven seasons with the Detroit Tigers (1907–1909), Washington Senators (1909–1910), Cincinnati Reds (1914–1916), and New York Giants (1916).

== Life and career ==
Born in Bloomingdale, Michigan, Killefer attended the University of Michigan from 1904 to 1907 before joining the Detroit Tigers in September 1907. Killefer led the American League and the National League in being hit by pitches in 1910 (16) and 1915 (19). Killefer batted .248 with 3 home runs in 467 career games. Though he played on the Tigers' American League pennant winning teams in 1907 and 1908, Killefer did not play in either World Series. On August 13, 1909, the Tigers traded Killefer and Germany Schaefer to the Washington Senators for Jim Delahanty.

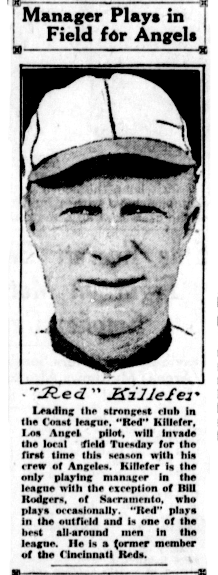
Red with the Pacific Coast League.

On July 20, 1916, Killefer was traded by the Reds with Buck Herzog to the New York Giants for three future Hall of Famers: Christy Mathewson, Edd Roush, and Bill McKechnie. After the trade, Killefer had only one at bat for the Giants before retiring.

In 467 major league games, Killefer was a versatile player who logged time at every position except pitcher: 135 games as a center fielder, 135 games as a left fielder, 129 games as a second baseman, 27 games as a right fielder, 11 games as a third baseman, 8 games as a shortstop, 3 games as a catcher, and 2 games as a first baseman.

Killefer is noted as being the first ever batter in a National League game at Wrigley Field (Wrigley had been a Federal League park in its first two years), as a visiting team batter for the Cincinnati Reds. After his playing career ended, Killefer was a minor league manager for 25 years, (1917–1941). His managerial career included stints with the following teams:

- Los Angeles Angels in the Pacific Coast League (1917–1922). He led the Angels to second-place finishes in his first three years with the team and finally to a PCL championship in 1921.
- Seattle Indians in the Pacific Coast League (1923–1927). He won a PCL championship with them in 1924.
- Mission Reds in the PCL (1928–1930).
- Indianapolis Indians in the American Association (1933–1937, 1941).
- Hollywood Stars of the Pacific Coast League (1938–1939).

He was inducted in the Pacific Coast League Hall of Fame.

Killefer's brother, Bill Killefer, was a major league catcher from 1909 to 1921 with the St. Louis Browns, Philadelphia Phillies, and Chicago Cubs.

== Death ==
Killefer died in Los Angeles at age 73 in 1958.
