= Ed Siever =

American baseball player (1875–1920)

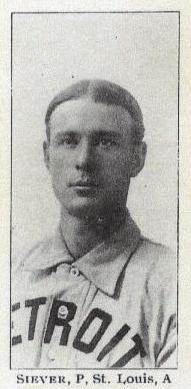
- Pitcher
- Born: April 2, 1875; Goddard, Kansas, U.S.
- Died: February 4, 1920 (aged 44); Detroit, Michigan, U.S.
- Batted: Left Threw: Left

MLB debut
- April 26, 1901, for the Detroit Tigers

Last MLB appearance
- June 18, 1908, for the Detroit Tigers

MLB statistics
- Win–loss record: 83–82
- Earned run average: 2.60
- Strikeouts: 470
- Stats at Baseball Reference

Teams
- Detroit Tigers (1901–1902); St. Louis Browns (1904–1905); Detroit Tigers (1906–1908)

Career highlights and awards
- AL ERA leader (1902)

Edward Tilden Siever (April 2, 1875 – February 4, 1920) was an American professional baseball pitcher. He played for 12 seasons from 1899 to 1910, including seven years in Major League Baseball with the Detroit Tigers (1901–1902, 1906–1908) and St. Louis Browns (1903–1904). He led the American League with a 1.91 earned run average (ERA) in 1902. In seven major league seasons, Siever compiled an 83–82 Win–loss record with a 2.60 ERA and 470 strikeouts in 1,507 innings pitched.

== Early years ==
Siever was born in Goddard, Kansas, in 1875. Prior to his professional baseball career he was a locomotive fireman for the Grand Trunk Railway.

== Professional baseball ==
=== Minor leagues ===
Siever began his professional baseball career with the London Cockneys in 1899 and 1900. He compiled a 14-8 record in 1899 and helped lead the Cockneys to the Canadian League pennant.

=== Detroit Tigers ===
In 1900, he joined the Detroit Tigers, then a minor league club, compiling a 6-5 record with a 3.97 earned run average (ERA). He was described by a writer in the Detroit Free Press as having "a great pitching arm and a physique as strong as a young lion."

In 1901, the American League became a major league. In the Tigers' inaugural season as a major league club, Siever and Roscoe Miller were the team's leading pitchers. Siever appeared in 38 games, 33 as a starter, compiled an 18-14 record and a 3.24 ERA with 30 complete games and 85 strikeouts in 288 2/3 innings pitched.

In 1902, Siever led the American League with a 1.91 ERA, and his Adjusted ERA+ of 195 remains the second best in Tigers history for a pitcher with more than 150 innings pitched. However, the 1902 Tigers lacked hitting and finished in seventh place. Despite his 1.91 ERA, Siever compiled an 8-11 record in 1902. On August 11, 1902, Siever and Rube Waddell engaged in a pitching duel that held both sides scoreless through 12 innings. Waddell hit a triple off Siever in the 13th inning to drive in the game's only run. Siever suffered from arm strain after the pitching duel with Waddell and was only able to pitch in two more games that season. According to one account, "His arm was in bad condition owing to strain, the results of that famous battle."

=== St. Louis Browns ===
In December 1902, contract negotiations between the Tigers and Siever broke down over money. In the end, Siever was sold to the St. Louis Browns. In 1903, he compiled a record of 13-14 with a 2.48 ERA in 254 innings pitched. The following year, he had a 10-15 record 2.65 ERA in 29 games with the Browns.

In January 1905, the Browns released Siever to the Indianapolis Indians in the minor leagues. He ended up with the Minneapolis Millers and, with his arm in "perfect working order," compiled a 23-11 record with a 2.74 ERA in 35 games for the Millers.

=== Detroit Tigers ===
In February 1906, Siever signed with the Detroit Tigers. He appeared in 30 games for the 1906 Tigers and compiled a 14-11 record and 2.71 ERA in 222 2/3 innings pitched. The following year, Siever compiled an 18-11 for the 1907 Tigers team that went 92-58 and lost to the Chicago Cubs in the 1907 World Series. Siever's 2.16 ERA ranked 10th in the American League in 1907. Siever started one game in the 1907 World Series and gave up two earned runs in four innings pitched. The Detroit Free Press later called 1907 season "the zenith of his career" and described a change in strategy in Siever's approach to the game: "While control and speed were 'Eddie's' best assets in his early career, in later years he resorted to the use of a slow ball, by using it in conjunction with a ball that burned its way plateward, he got away with many sensational victories."

In his final major league season, he compiled a 2-6 record for the 1907 Tigers. During his seven years in the major leagues, Siever compiled an 83–82 record with a 2.60 ERA and 470 strikeouts in 1,507 innings pitched.

=== Minor leagues ===
Although his major league career ended in 1908, he pitched for two additional years in the minor leagues with Aberdeen and Grays Harbor in 1909 and Chattanooga in 1910.

== Later years ==
After retiring from professional baseball, Siever continued to play amateur baseball in a Detroit Masonic league until he was badly injured in a fall. Siever was employed by the Board of Water Commissioners. He was married and had three sons with his wife, Charlotte. Siever died suddenly in 1920 at age 44. The cause of death was believed to be heart disease.

== See also ==
- List of Major League Baseball annual ERA leaders
