= Boss Schmidt =

American baseball player (1880–1932)

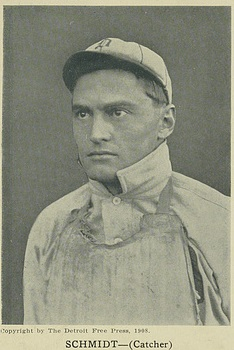
- Catcher
- Born: September 12, 1880; London, Arkansas, U.S.
- Died: November 14, 1932 (aged 52); Altus, Arkansas, U.S.
- Batted: Right Threw: Right

MLB debut
- April 30, 1906, for the Detroit Tigers

Last MLB appearance
- October 8, 1911, for the Detroit Tigers

MLB statistics
- Batting average: .243
- Home runs: 3
- Runs batted in: 124
- Stats at Baseball Reference

Teams
- Detroit Tigers (1906–1911)

Charles "Boss" Schmidt (September 12, 1880 – November 14, 1932) was an American professional baseball catcher for the Detroit Tigers of Major League Baseball (MLB)

A native of Arkansas, Schmidt played professional baseball from 1901 to 1926, including six seasons in MLB with Detroit from 1906 to 1911. He was the starting catcher on the Detroit teams that won three consecutive American League pennants from 1907 to 1909. He also led the American League in errors by a catcher in each of those seasons. Schmidt had a reputation for toughness enhanced by his grotesque-looking hands, the result of work as a coal miner and prizefighter.

Following his MLB career, Schmidt played Minor League Baseball for another 15 seasons. He then coached and managed ballclubs before dying suddenly of an intestinal obstruction in 1932.

== Early years ==
Schmidt was born on September 12, 1880, in London, Arkansas. (Note: Schmidt's 1932 obituary in the Detroit Free Press lists his place of birth as Coal Hill, Arkansas.) His parents were immigrants from Germany. As a young man, Schmidt worked in the local coal mines, "cutting, shoveling, and pushing carts of coal".

== Professional baseball player ==
=== Minor leagues ===
Schmidt began his baseball career with a semipro baseball team in Fort Smith, Arkansas. In 1901, he joined the Little Rock Travelers of the Southern Association. Duke Finn, his manager at Little Rock, thought Schmidt showed good baseball judgment during games. Schmidt then played for the Springfield Reds of the Missouri Valley League (1902–1904), the Rock Island Islanders of the Three-I League (1903), and the Minneapolis Millers of the American Association (1904–1905).

=== Detroit Tigers ===
==== 1906 season ====
In late August 1905, the Minneapolis Millers sold Schmidt, Davy Jones, and Ed Siever to the Detroit Tigers. Schmidt was initially a holdout from the Tigers' 1906 training camp, but he finally reported on March 21. During the 1906 season, Schmidt shared catching duties with John Warner and Fred Payne. He appeared in 68 games, 64 of which were as the team's starting catcher. Schmidt compiled a .218 batting average, not a great figure, but manager Bill Armour told him to concentrate on defense and handling the pitchers on the roster. Despite appearing in less than half the team's games, Schmidt ranked among the American League's best defensive catchers with 106 assists (fourth in the American League), 72 players caught stealing (fifth in the American League), and a 50.7 percent rate of catching runners attempting to steal (fourth in the American League).

==== 1907 season ====
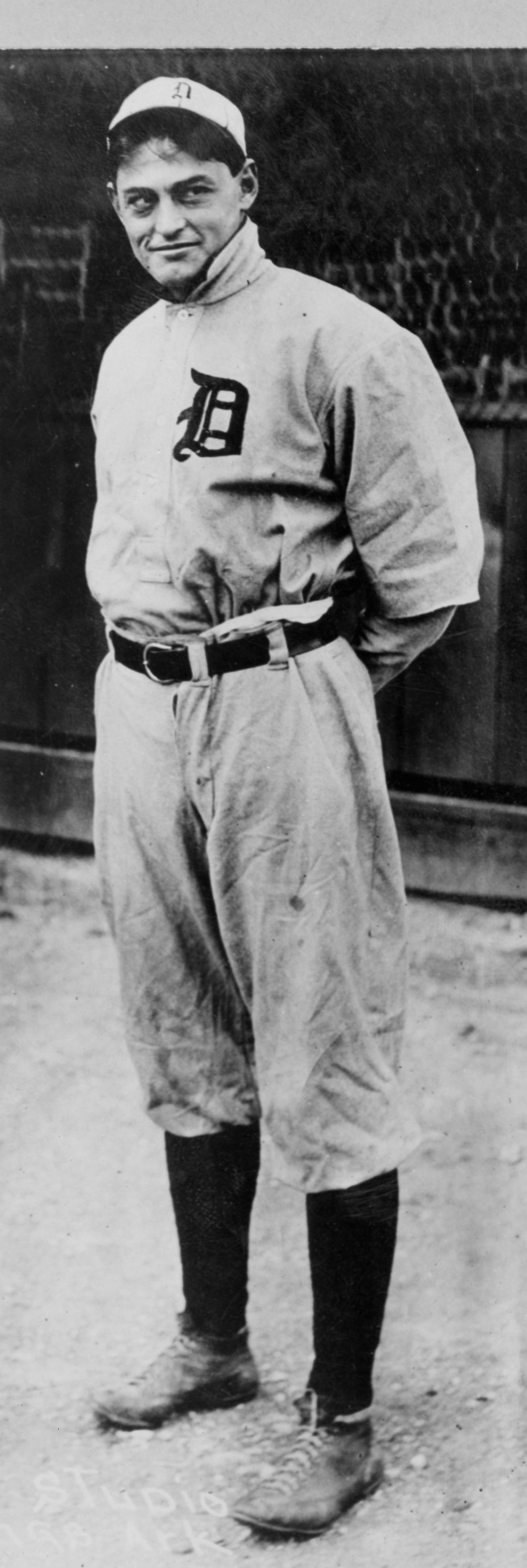
Schmidt in 1909

In 1907, Schmidt appeared in 104 games, 96 as the Tigers' starting catcher, and compiled a .244 batting average with six triples and eight stolen bases. Defensively, he led the American League's catchers with 14 double plays turned, but also led the league with 34 errors at catcher and ranked second with 16 passed balls.

The Tigers won the American League pennant and lost to the Chicago Cubs in the 1907 World Series. Schmidt hit .167 (two singles in 12 at bats) in the World Series, and his multiple defensive lapses in Game 1 were particularly costly. The Cubs stole six bases on Schmidt during the first game. Schmidt's poor throw to second base in the fourth inning failed to catch Frank Chance who was heading down the line when the batter swung and missed. An accurate throw would have ended the inning; instead, Chance eventually scored on a base hit. The Tigers led in the ninth inning with two outs and Chicago's Harry Steinfeldt on third base; Chicago pinch hitter Del Howard swung on a third strike that should have ended the game, but "Schmidt missed the ball, which got by him to the crowd." His passed ball allowed Steinfeldt to score the tying run in a contest that ended tied after 12 innings. After the game, Joe S. Jackson of the Detroit Free Press wrote: "The surprise of the game was the poor work of Charlie Schmidt, who had an off day such as probably will not come to him again in the series. He found it almost impossible to locate second sack, and only once, in a half dozen tries, did he manage to put the ball where the infielder could get it on the runner." Schmidt also caught Games 3 and 4, allowing two stolen bases in each game. He made one other appearance in the series, pinch-hitting in the ninth inning of Game 5.

After the season, X-rays revealed a severe dislocation on the forefinger of Schmidt's throwing hand. Doctors examining the injury questioned how Schmidt had been able to play in the World Series at all. The finger was broken in a game in mid-September; he underwent surgery in November to re-break the finger to allow it to heal properly.

==== 1908 season ====
In 1908, Schmidt appeared in a career-high 122 games, starting 113 behind the plate for the Tigers. It was his best season offensively, as he compiled a .265 batting average. He also had his best defensive season, leading the American League's catchers with 184 assists and 129 runners caught stealing, though he also led the league with 37 errors at catcher and 115 stolen bases allowed. Many people who saw him play speculated that his gnarled hands made it difficult to grip the ball, which led to all the stolen bases against him. However, Schmidt ranked second among the league's catchers with 12 double plays turned and third with 541 putouts. His defensive wins above replacement rating of 2.6 was the third highest among all position players in the league during the 1908 season.

Schmidt's 1908 season was marred by another poor showing in the World Series. The Tigers won their second consecutive pennant and again lost to the Cubs in the 1908 World Series. Schmidt hit .071 (one single in 14 at bats) in the series, and allowed 12 stolen bases in four games of the series. For the second year in a row, he made the last out of the series, becoming the only player ever to do so twice.

==== 1909 season ====
Prior to the 1909 season, Schmidt did not attend spring training with the team, instead holding out over salary issues. On March 3, he announced that he had purchased a half interest in a shoe store in Fort Smith and would miss the 1909 season so that he could manage his store. Aside from salary demands, he expressed frustration with the way the press treated him in 1907 and 1908. Schmidt argued that reporters who criticized his misplays were not taking into consideration his skill or the fact that injuries to his throwing hand had hindered his last two seasons. Schmidt ultimately reported to the team on April 9.

However, Schmidt now faced competition from rookie Oscar Stanage. The pair shared the catching duties in 1909, with Schmidt starting 76 games and Stanage starting 74. Schmidt's batting average in 1909 dipped to a career-low .209 while Stanage hit more than 50 points higher at .262. Moreover, Schmidt led the American League's catchers in errors (20) for the third consecutive year. To his credit, he also ranked third among the league's catchers with 83 runners caught stealing.

The Tigers won their third consecutive pennant in 1909. In the six games of the 1909 World Series in which he played, Schmidt compiled a .222 batting average (three doubles and a single in 18 at bats), The Pittsburgh Pirates stole 15 bases against him, en route to winning the series in seven games.

==== 1910 and 1911 seasons ====
Before the 1910 season, Schmidt purchased a saloon in Fort Smith. During the season, he was overtaken by Stanage as the Tigers' primary catcher, with Stanage starting 83 games at the position to 54 for Schmidt. Schmidt's batting average improved to .259, and he hit a career-high seven triples.

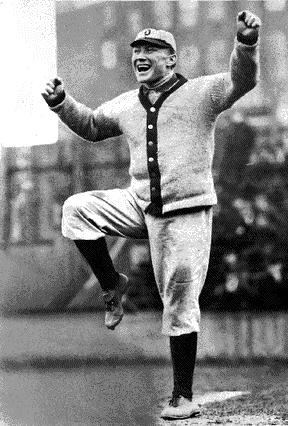
Detroit manager Hughie Jennings

In January 1911, Schmidt sent a lengthy letter published by the Detroit Free Press complaining of mistreatment by manager Hughie Jennings. The letter asserted:

"If ever a catcher has worked under a handicap, I certainly have. I have had a manager to fight, besides the other clubs and he has done everything in his power to put me out of baseball. . . . When the manager and catcher speak only when absolutely necessary, during a whole season; when a catcher that has worked as hard as I did in three seasons, pennant winning seasons, and then is benched for half a season, for nothing more than a personal dislike and when a man has given a team his best efforts and worked with a broken ankle, crippled hands, disabled in other ways, something no other man would have done and then gets hooks thrown into him, it doesn't make him feel the best in the world. . . . I think I have got a rotten deal in Detroit. I like Detroit and its people. They have all treated me well. . . . but Jennings and I can never get along."

Jennings announced during spring training that Schmidt would be the backup to Stanage. During the 1911 season, Schmidt appeared in 28 games, only seven as the Tigers' starting catcher, and compiled a .283 batting average in 46 at bats. He appeared in his final major league game on October 8, 1911. The Detroit Free Press in October 1911 wrote: "Schmidt, who reported with a sore arm, has done practically no work this season, beyond warming up the pitchers and some very useful pinch hitting when called upon." Russo wrote that "Schmidt was worn down from abusing his body throughout the years." In January 1912, the Tigers dealt Schmidt to the minor league Providence Grays.

In six major league seasons, Schmidt appeared in 477 games, 410 of them as Detroit's starting catcher. He compiled a .243 batting average, .270 on-base percentage, .307 slugging percentage, 41 doubles, 22 triples, and 23 stolen bases.

=== Reputation for toughness ===
Schmidt's work in the coal mines as a young man helped him to develop a muscular and powerful physique. His hands particularly stood out for their grotesque-looking calluses and scar tissue. Even early in his baseball career, his knuckles and joints bore the signs of extreme disfigurement, a result of his work in the coal mines and his prizefighting. Schmidt put this to his advantage, though, regularly using his right fist to divert baserunners from reaching home plate and sometimes simply punching his opponents.

Schmidt had two fights with Ty Cobb. Their first clash came in Augusta, Georgia, in March 1907, when Schmidt alleged that Cobb was trying to chase a drunk groundskeeper into the Warren Park clubhouse. The groundskeeper's wife then began to yell at Cobb, to which he responded by attempting to choke the woman. Schmidt and several other players got involved in the fray, with Schmidt calling Cobb a "coward" for his treatment of the woman. Cobb and Schmidt then exchanged blows before being separated by their teammates. However, this version of the event is based solely on Schmidt’s statement to the press with no other witnesses, which caused some to doubt whether the assault on the couple ever actually happened. (Note: A myth started after the fight that Cobb was choking the groundskeeper's wife, but Cobb historian Wesley Fricks has not found a basis for this in any of the eyewitness accounts.)

Both participants wanted a rematch, and they staged a second fight at a baseball field in Meridian, Mississippi, on a day off later in the season. Schmidt battered Cobb close to unconsciousness during the second fight, but admired Cobb's resiliency and stayed to revive the man as he lay motionless on the Tigers' dressing room floor. Cobb, in turn, respected Schmidt's conduct during the fight, and remarked: "He fought the fight clean and on the square." Despite their clashes, Schmidt and Cobb became close friends until Schmidt's death in 1932.

Schmidt was a skilled boxer. In March 1910, Schmidt issued a public challenge to fight any player in the major leagues, saying, "I want a fight and I want it badly." He announced that he was training with former welterweight boxing champion Rube Ferns and offered to put up $2,000 of his own money on the outcome of the fight. In early 1911, Schmidt won a match against a boxer named McDonald, and rumors spread that Schmidt hoped to become the "great white hope" by taking on heavyweight champion Jack Johnson. Ferns, representing Schmidt, issued a public letter denying any interest on Schmidt's part in fighting Johnson or "any of the Ethiopian race."

Aside from his prowess as a fighter, Schmidt was also known for other displays of his physical toughness. He did not use shinguards during games. Using only his fists, he could hammer nails through a floorboard. Accompanying his teammates to a carnival on one occasion, he had a wrestling match with a bear, pinning the animal in place by the end of the fight. He likely would have played MLB baseball longer had he not suffered many fractures sustained of his thumb and fingers during his career.

=== Return to minor leagues ===
After his major league career ended, Schmidt continued to play in the minor leagues for another 15 years. With Providence in 1912, he batted .342 in 132 games, telling Cobb after the season he felt better physically than he had in several years. Schmidt also had stints with the Mobile Sea Gulls (1913–1916), Vernon Tigers (1916), Memphis Chickasaws (1917), Sioux City Indians (1919), Tulsa Oilers (1919), Fort Smith Twins (1920–1921), Atlanta Crackers (1921–1922), Springfield Midgets (1924), and Kalamazoo Celery Pickers (1926). He served as a player-manager at Mobile (1915–1916), Sioux City (1917, 1919), Fort Smith (1920–1921), Springfield (1924), and Kalamazoo (1926). He also managed the Quincy Red Birds in 1927.

== Personal life and later years ==
Schmidt's younger brother, Walter Schmidt, was also a major league catcher, playing for the Pirates from 1916 to 1924.

The nickname "Boss" is usually attributed to Schmidt's characteristic take-charge attitude when he played ballgames. Some newspapers attributed it to his dominance of prizefights, and other reporters thought it originated during his service in the coal mines.

After his major league career ended, Schmidt was employed as a coach for the Brooklyn Robins of the National League in 1923, an umpire in the Pacific Coast League in 1925, a manager at Quincy in 1927, an umpire in the Atlantic League in 1928, and a coach for the Detroit Tigers in 1929. In the early 1930s, he worked for Ford Motor Company in Detroit and managed the Walkerville baseball team of the Michigan–Ontario League in 1932.

Schmidt died suddenly in November 1932 in Altus, Arkansas. The cause of death was an intestinal obstruction. Upon hearing of his friend's death, Cobb wept, saying, "In all my years in baseball, I don't think I ever saw anyone tougher than my old friend Charlie Schmidt. I will always remember him fondly."

The ex-catcher was buried at St. Mary Catholic Cemetery in Altus. His grave was unmarked for over 30 years. When the Tigers found out about this in 1969, they paid to have a new headstone installed at the site. The stone lists Schmidt's name, date of birth, date of death, and the following epitaph: "A DETROIT TIGER 1906–1911."

== Bibliography ==
- Russo, Frank (2014). The Cooperstown Chronicles: Baseball's Colorful Characters, Unusual Lives, and Strange Demises. New York: Rowman & Littlefield. ISBN 978-1-4422-3639-4.
