= Charley O'Leary =

American baseball player and coach (1875–1941)

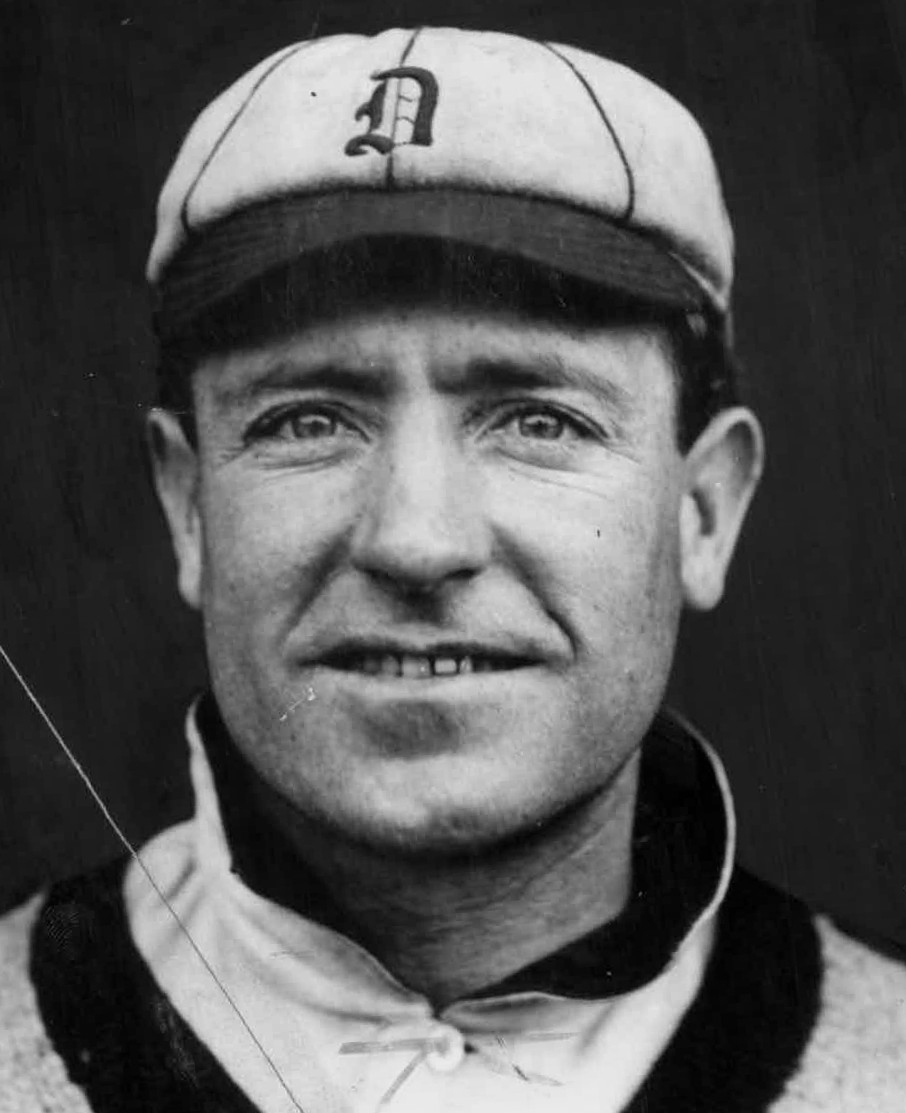
- O'Leary with the Detroit Tigers
- Shortstop
- Born: October 15, 1875; Chicago, Illinois, U.S.
- Died: January 6, 1941 (aged 65); Chicago, Illinois, U.S.
- Batted: Right Threw: Right

MLB debut
- April 14, 1904, for the Detroit Tigers

Last MLB appearance
- September 30, 1934, for the St. Louis Browns

MLB statistics
- Batting average: .226
- Home runs: 3
- Runs batted in: 213
- Stats at Baseball Reference

Teams
- As a player: Detroit Tigers (1904–1912); St. Louis Cardinals (1913); St. Louis Browns (1934); As a coach: St. Louis Cardinals (1913–1917); New York Yankees (1921–1930); Chicago Cubs (1931–1933); St. Louis Browns (1934–1937)

Career highlights and awards
- 3× World Series champion (1923, 1927, 1928); Oldest player to record a hit; Oldest player to score a run; Second-oldest player to appear in a game

Charles Timothy O'Leary (October 15, 1875 – January 6, 1941) was an American professional baseball shortstop who played eleven seasons with the Detroit Tigers (1904–1912), St. Louis Cardinals (1913), and St. Louis Browns (1934) of Major League Baseball (MLB).

== Early life ==
Born in Chicago, Illinois to Irish immigrants Timothy and Ellen O’Leary, who had 16 children (11 boys). O'Leary worked at age 16 for a clothing company and played on the company's semi-pro baseball team. In 1900, while working as a messenger boy, he was sent to the ballpark of the Chicago White Stockings; when their shortstop, Frank Shugart, was injured, O'Leary was recruited on the spot, based on the recommendation of someone who knew him. His talent as a middle infielder and scrappy hitter came to the attention of Charles Comiskey, owner of the White Stockings (later the Chicago White Sox). Though there is no independent verification, O'Leary reportedly signed briefly with the team, only to have his arm broken from a pitched ball thrown by 'fireballer' and Hall of Famer Rube Waddell.

== Major leagues ==
O'Leary made his major league debut on April 14, 1904, with the Tigers. He was Detroit's starting shortstop from 1904 to 1907 and became a backup shortstop and utility infielder from 1908–1912.

In the off-season, O'Leary and teammate Germany Schaefer, known as one of baseball's zaniest characters, worked as a comic vaudeville act. The O'Leary-Schaefer vaudeville act is said to have inspired two Metro-Goldwyn-Mayer musicals: the forgotten 1930 film They Learned About Women and Busby Berkeley's last film, Take Me Out to the Ballgame (1949), with Gene Kelly and Frank Sinatra.

Not known for his hitting, O'Leary had a career batting average of .226.

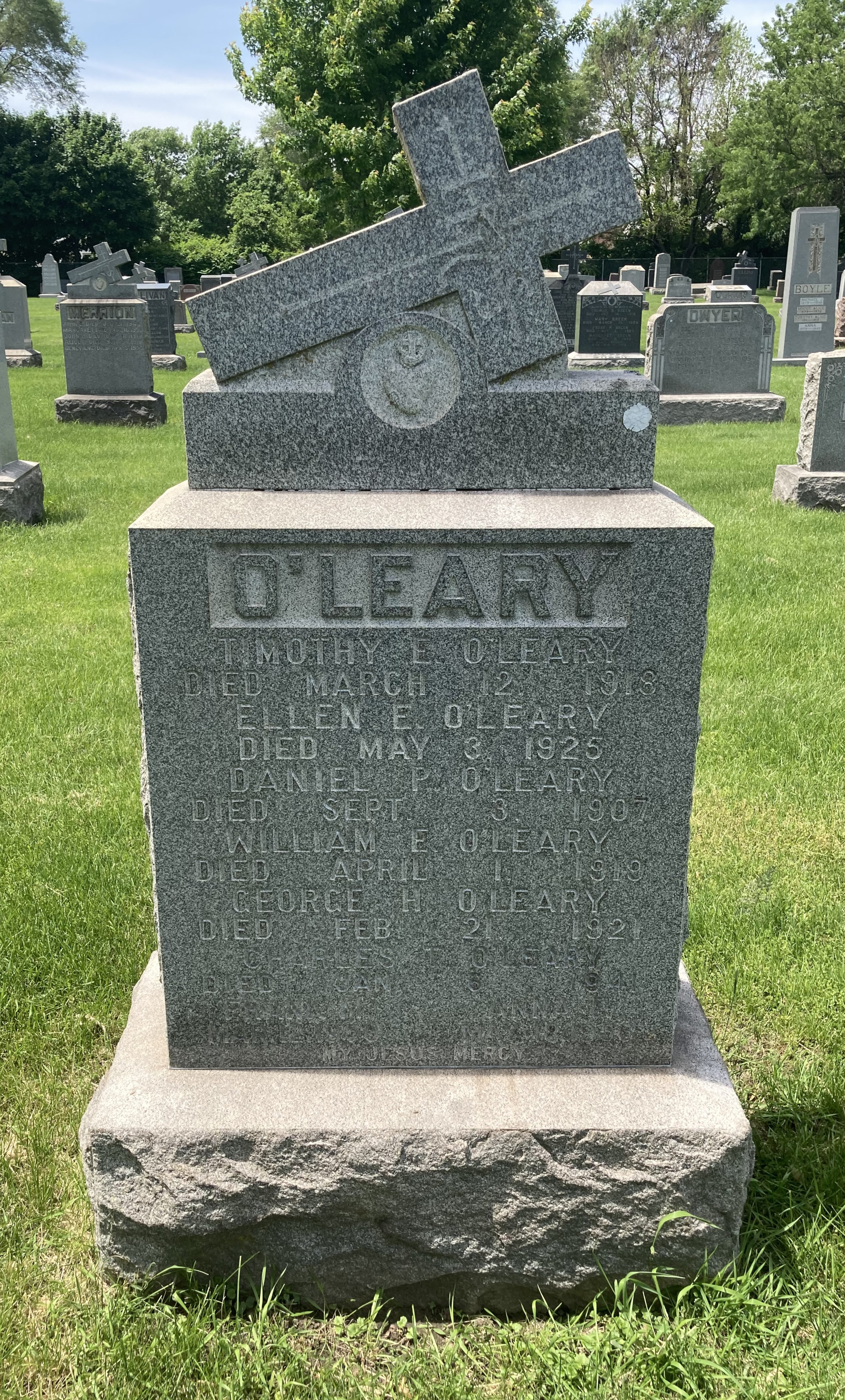
O'Leary's grave at Mount Olivet Cemetery

After finishing his playing career in 1913 with the St. Louis Cardinals, O'Leary became a player-manager in the minor and semi-pro leagues for several years, including in San Francisco, St. Paul, San Antonio, and Chicago, until he was offered a coaching job in 1920 by his close friend, Miller Huggins, manager of the New York Yankees. After a 17–0 victory over the Washington Senators on July 6, 1920, O'Leary was returning to New York in a car driven by Babe Ruth, along with Ruth's wife Helen, rookie outfielder Frank Gleich, and second-string catcher Fred Hofmann. Ruth lost control of the car, and O'Leary was ejected from the vehicle, although he suffered only minor injuries. He then coached with the Yankees for 10 years, during which period they won six pennants and two World Series, including the great 1927 Yankees team. O'Leary then coached with the Chicago Cubs under Rogers Hornsby, and with the St. Louis Browns.

On September 30, 1934, several weeks shy of his 59th birthday, O'Leary was brought out of retirement by the Browns. In a pinch-hitting appearance, he singled and subsequently scored, becoming both the oldest Major League Baseball player to collect a hit and score a run.

He died from peritonitis in Chicago on January 6, 1941, and was buried at Mount Olivet Cemetery.

== Date of birth ==
During his career, O'Leary claimed to have been born in 1882. However, in 2010, a researcher for the Society for American Baseball Research found him in the 1880 census. His draft record for World War I, which showed that he was born in 1875, was subsequently located. This made him the second-oldest Major League Baseball player to appear in a game, after Satchel Paige.

== See also ==
- List of oldest Major League Baseball players
- 1909 Detroit Tigers season
- List of St. Louis Cardinals coaches
