= Jimmy Slagle =

American baseball player (1873–1956)

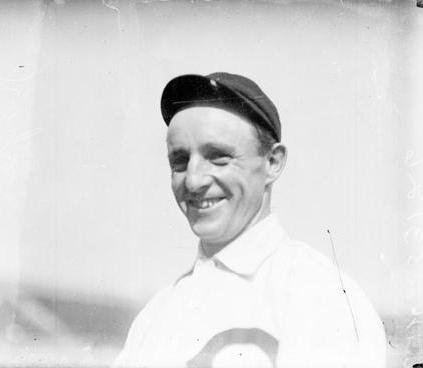
- Outfielder
- Born: July 11, 1873; Worthville, Pennsylvania, U.S.
- Died: May 10, 1956 (aged 82); Chicago, Illinois, U.S.
- Batted: Left Threw: Right

MLB debut
- April 17, 1899, for the Washington Senators

Last MLB appearance
- October 3, 1908, for the Chicago Cubs

MLB statistics
- Batting average: .268
- Home runs: 2
- Runs batted in: 344
- Stolen bases: 274
- Stats at Baseball Reference

Teams
- Washington Senators (1899); Philadelphia Phillies (1900–1901); Boston Beaneaters (1901); Chicago Cubs (1902–1908)

Career highlights and awards
- World Series champion (1907)

James Franklin Slagle (July 11, 1873 – May 10, 1956), nicknamed both "Rabbit" and "Shorty", was an American professional baseball player who played as an outfielder in Major League Baseball from 1899 to 1908. In his ten major league seasons, he played for four teams, all in the National League. Officially, he was 5 feet 7 inches (1.70 m) in height and weighed 144 pounds (65 kg). He batted left-handed and threw right-handed.

== Biography ==
Slagle began his professional career in minor league baseball in 1895. In 1898, he won the Western League batting title with a .378 average. He spent four seasons in the minor leagues before signing with the Washington Senators in 1899. He played one season in Washington, D. C. before signing with the Philadelphia Phillies when the Senators folded. Over the next two season, he played for the Phillies and, for a short time, the Boston Beaneaters. In 1902, he signed with the Chicago Cubs, and stayed with the team for seven seasons. He was the Cubs' starting center fielder for three of their National League championships, from 1906 to 1908, which included two World Series victories. Slagle became the first player to successfully accomplish a straight steal of home in World Series play.

His last major league season was in 1908, and later played two more seasons in the minor leagues in 1909 and 1910. He later settled in Chicago, where he died in 1956, at the age of 82.

In 1300 games over 10 seasons, Slagle posted a .268 batting average (1343 hits in 5005 at bats), scoring 781 runs and hitting 124 doubles, 56 triples, and two home runs, with 344 runs batted in, 274 stolen bases, 619 bases on balls, a .352 on-base percentage and a .317 slugging percentage. Although on three straight Cubs pennant winners, he appeared only in the 1907 World Series, batting .273 (6 hits in 22 at bats), scoring three runs, with three runs batted in, six stolen bases and two walks.

== See also ==
- List of Major League Baseball career stolen bases leaders
