= Elijah Jones (baseball) =

American baseball player (1882–1943)

- Pitcher
- Born: April 13, 1882; Oxford, Michigan, U.S.
- Died: April 29, 1943 (aged 61); Pontiac, Michigan, U.S.
- Batted: Right Threw: Right

MLB debut
- April 13, 1907, for the Detroit Tigers

Last MLB appearance
- April 24, 1909, for the Detroit Tigers

MLB statistics
- Win–loss record: 1-2
- Earned run average: 4.15
- Strikeouts: 11
- Stats at Baseball Reference

Teams
- Detroit Tigers (1907, 1909)

Elijah Albert Jones (January 27, 1882 – April 29, 1943), nicknamed "Bumpus", (not to be confused with Charles "Bumpus" Jones who shares occupation and position) was an American baseball pitcher. He was born in Oxford, Michigan, in 1882 and played seven years of professional baseball from 1906 to 1912, including two seasons in Major League Baseball with the Detroit Tigers in 1907 and 1909. He appeared in six major league games and compiled a 1-2 record with a 4.15 earned run average (ERA). He died in 1943 in Pontiac, Michigan, at age 61.
