= Germany Schaefer =

American baseball player (1876–1919)

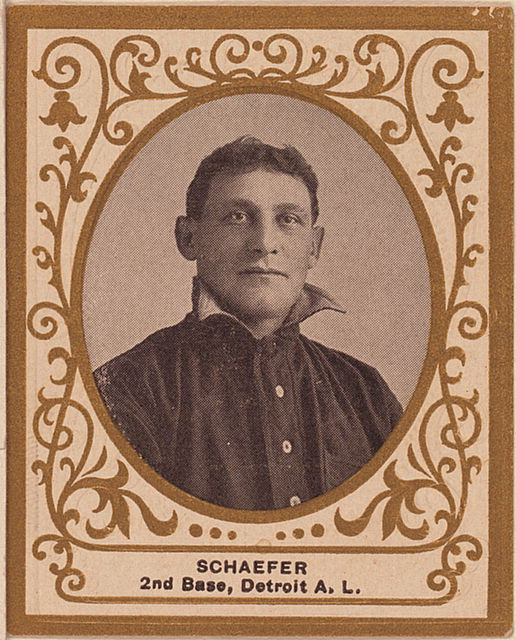
- Second baseman
- Born: February 4, 1876; Chicago, Illinois, U.S.
- Died: May 16, 1919 (aged 43); Saranac Lake, New York, U.S.
- Batted: Right Threw: Right

MLB debut
- October 5, 1901, for the Chicago Cubs

Last MLB appearance
- April 25, 1918, for the Cleveland Indians

MLB statistics
- Batting average: .257
- Home runs: 9
- Runs batted in: 309
- Stats at Baseball Reference

Teams
- Chicago Cubs (1901–1902); Detroit Tigers (1905–1909); Washington Senators (1909–1914); Newark Pepper (1915); New York Yankees (1916); Cleveland Indians (1918)

Herman A. "Germany" Schaefer (February 4, 1876 – May 16, 1919) was an American second baseman, first baseman and third baseman in Major League Baseball who played 15 seasons with the Chicago Cubs, Detroit Tigers, Washington Senators, Newark Peppers, New York Yankees, and Cleveland Indians.

== Biography ==
Born William Herman Schaefer in the South Side of Chicago, to German immigrant parents, he played in two World Series with the Tigers. During the 1909 season, Schaefer and Red Killefer were traded by the Tigers to the Senators for Jim Delahanty. In 1,150 career games, Schaefer batted .257 with 9 home runs and 201 stolen bases.

Schaefer was known as both a baseball trickster and a tactician in the early years of 20th century baseball. Well liked, stories of his exploits dot both the memories of his contemporaries and the newspaper reports of the time. One of his most famous exploits was stealing first base, which was perhaps recalled in Lawrence Ritter's The Glory of Their Times by Detroit outfielder Davy Jones. With runners on first and third, a common ploy in baseball at the time was an attempted double steal, in which the runner heading from first (in this case Schaefer) ran for second, hoping to draw a throw from the catcher as the runner on third tried to scamper home. The catcher did not throw the first time, inspiring Schaefer to steal first base in reverse and then attempt the double steal once more on the following pitch. It worked in Jones' recollection although factual evidence of this is lacking.

On August 4, 1911, Schaefer tried the same stunt again, this time for the Washington Senators, inspiring the Chicago White Sox' manager, Hugh Duffy, to come out of the dugout to protest. With the chaos on the field, Clyde Milan attempted to steal home, where he was thrown out. This event was recorded by both The Washington Post and the Chicago Tribune on the following day.

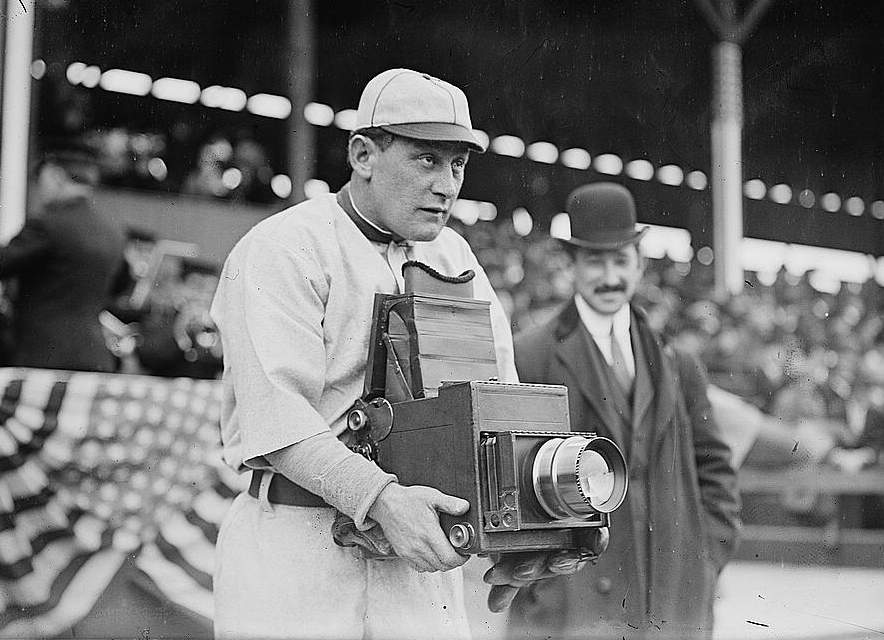
Schaefer in 1911

Although it was not passed until 1920, after Schaefer's death, a baseball rule (currently 5.09(b)(10)) states that a player is out if "After he has acquired legal possession of a base, he runs the bases in reverse order for the purpose of confusing the defense or making a travesty of the game. The umpire shall immediately call 'Time' and declare the runner out". It is often said that it was passed because of Schaefer's thefts.

Though a clown on the field, Schaefer had a very sound baseball mind. He also made many friends throughout the baseball world, including the irascible Ty Cobb. Schaefer bestowed upon Walter Johnson his nickname "Barney" at a traffic stop, claiming that Johnson was Barney Oldfield, the racecar driver, a stunt that got him out of a speeding ticket. Schaefer modified his own moniker, "Germany", replacing it with "Liberty" after the United States declared war on Germany in 1917.

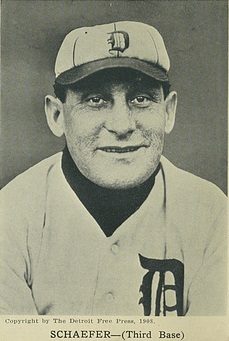
Schaefer in 1908 with Detroit

Schaefer was the player representative present at the meeting held in preparation for the 1907 World Series between Schaefer's team, the Tigers, and the Chicago Cubs. The others in the meeting, discussing ground rules, players' pool, etc., were "Garry" Herrman, owner of the Cincinnati Reds and head of the Commission; the league presidents Ban Johnson and Harry Pulliam, the managers Hughie Jennings and Frank Chance, and the two umpires, Hank O'Day and Jack Sheridan. Schaefer asked "Is a tie game a legal game?" It was supposedly a trivial question, but Schaefer made a point: If there is a tie game in the Series, do the players share in its gate receipts? After a short discussion with Johnson and Pulliam, Herrman answered, 'The players' pool will include receipts from any tie games.' As luck would have it, the first game was a 12-inning, 3–3 tie, called due to darkness. The players shared in the receipts of all five games (the Cubs won the next four in a row). But a month later the Commission changed its ruling: The players share in the receipts of the first four games only, ties or no ties.

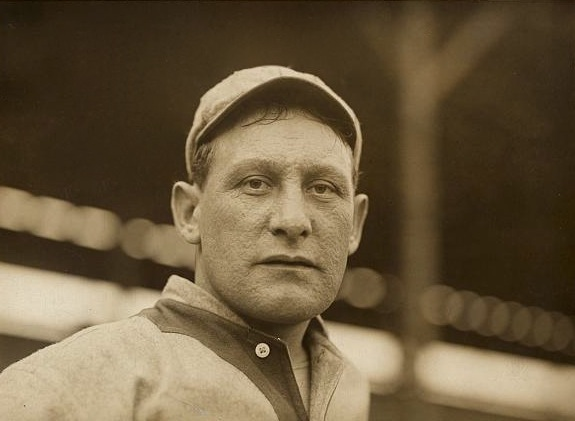
Germany Schaefer, circa 1911

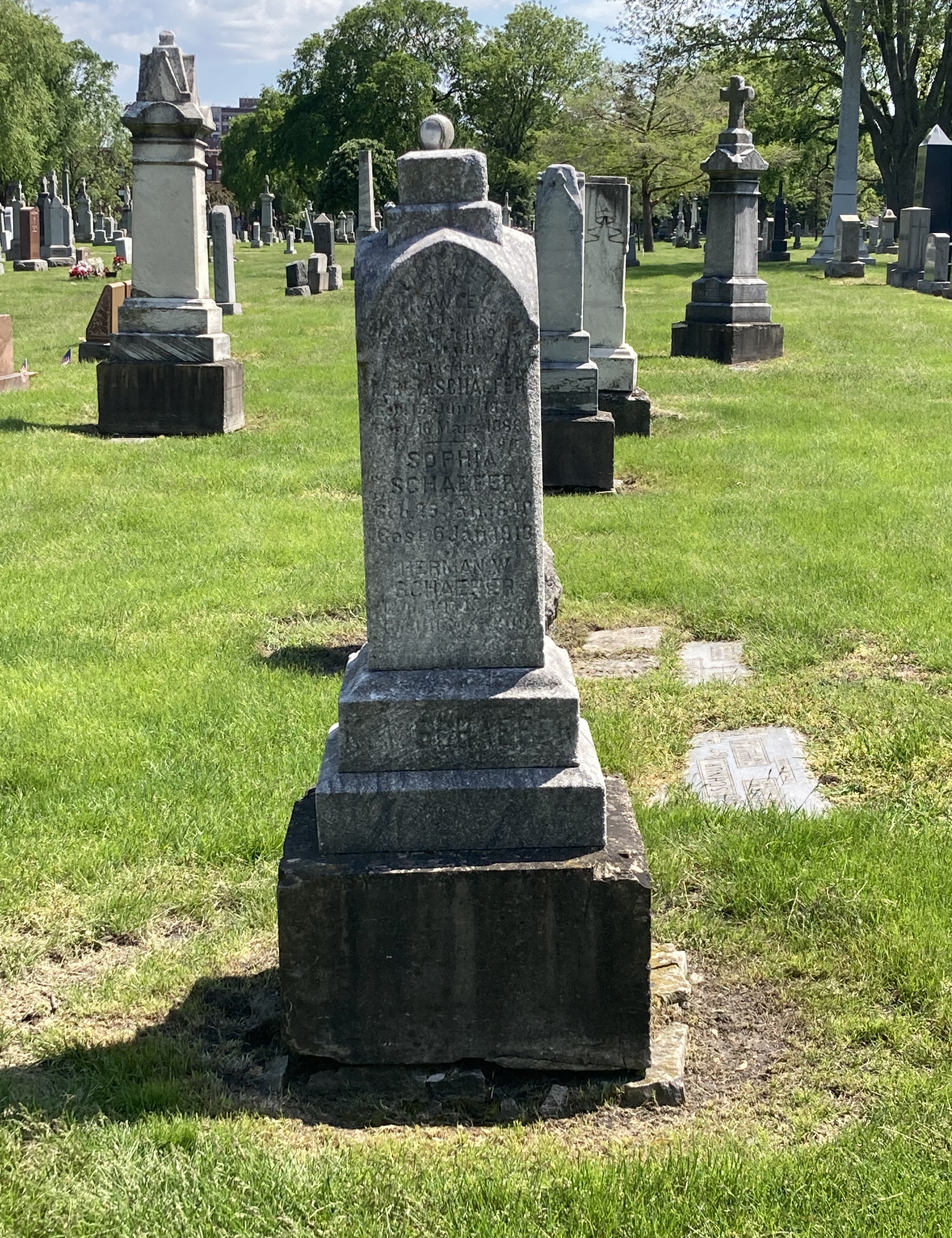
Schaefer's grave, topped with a baseball, at St. Boniface Catholic Cemetery

Jimmy McAleer, Schaefer's manager with the Washington Senators, took him on several barnstorming all star trips, and with an all star team posing as the New York Giants he traveled around the world in 1913, playing a variety of positions and entertaining crowds and his teammates alike. In Ceylon, Schaefer even struck up a kinship with tea magnate Sir Thomas Lipton. Schaefer was a pioneer of baseball clowning, and his vaudeville act with teammate Charley O'Leary was inspiration for the MGM musical Take Me Out To The Ball Game starring Gene Kelly and Frank Sinatra. He also teamed with Nick Altrock, who later took baseball clowning to legendary heights with Al Schacht.

Among Schaefer's legendary antics are diversionary tactics with umbrellas, raincoats and galoshes, to get games canceled on account of the weather. In one story he wears the outfit out onto the playing field, in another he wears it to the plate during a drizzle, but when the umpire sends him back to the dugout to take it off, the rains begin to pour, forcing the umpire to indeed call the game. An account of Schaefer wearing a raincoat onto the field occurs in the July 4, 1906, edition of The Washington Post. It is not known whether he wore it on offense or defense. Schaefer once verbally "called" his shot before hitting a two-run home run on June 24, 1906 to put the Tigers up 3–2 against the Chicago White Sox in the top of the 9th.

In 1919, a little over a year after Schaefer played his last game, he died in Saranac Lake, New York. Several of his baseball contemporaries died of tuberculosis at the sanitarium there, and that disease also claimed Schaefer. While on a scouting trip to Lake Placid, New York, Schaefer suffered a fatal hemorrhage complicating his pulmonary tuberculosis. He died at 9:30 AM on May 16, 1919, at age 43, according to the death certificate signed by John A. Farrell, M.D. of Saranac Lake.

He was buried at St. Boniface Catholic Cemetery in Chicago.

== See also ==
- List of Major League Baseball career stolen bases leaders
