= 1907 World Series =

1907 Major League Baseball championship series

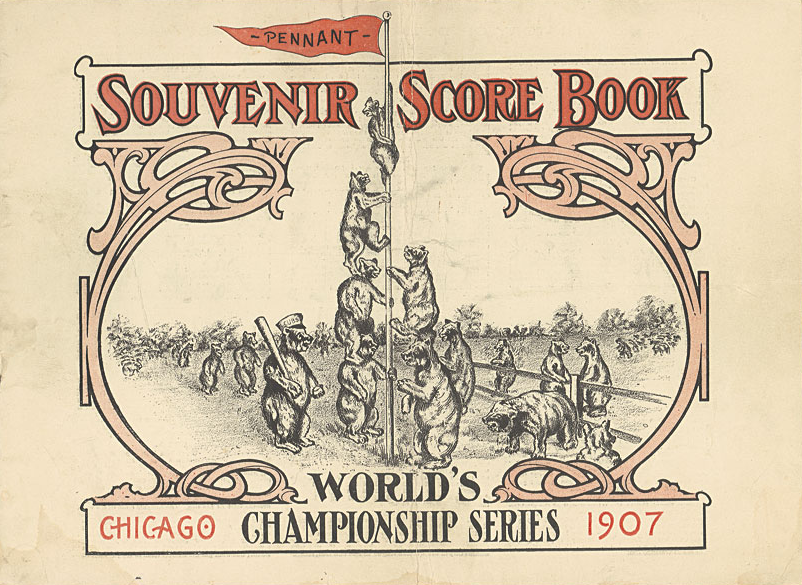
Team (Wins)	Managers	Season
Chicago Cubs (4)	Frank Chance (player/manager)	107–45, .704, GA: 17
Detroit Tigers (0)	Hughie Jennings	92–58, .613, GA: 1 1/2
- Dates: October 8–12
- Venue(s): West Side Grounds (Chicago); Bennett Park (Detroit)
- Umpires: Hank O'Day (NL); Jack Sheridan (AL)
- Hall of Famers: Umpire: Hank O'Day; Cubs: Mordecai Brown; Frank Chance; Johnny Evers; Joe Tinker; Tigers: Sam Crawford; Ty Cobb; Hughie Jennings (manager)

The 1907 World Series was the championship series in Major League Baseball for the 1907 season. The fourth edition of the World Series, it featured the defending National League (NL) champion Chicago Cubs and the American League (AL) champion Detroit Tigers. The Cubs won the Series four games to none (with one tie) for their first championship.

The series had been scheduled for two games in Chicago, three games in Detroit, and one game in Chicago (games beyond the first four, only if necessary). Had a seventh game been necessary, its location was to be decided by the league office. After the first game ended in a tie, the series did not move to Detroit until Game 4.

The Cubs came back strong from their shocking loss in the 1906 World Series. The Tigers' young star Ty Cobb came into the Series with the first of his many league batting championships. With pitching dominance over the Tigers and Cobb, the Cubs allowed only three runs in the four games they won, while stealing 18 bases off the rattled Tigers.

Each game was umpired by the two-man crew of Hank O'Day and Jack Sheridan.

This was the last time the Tigers were swept in the World Series until 2012.

== Summary ==
NL Chicago Cubs (4) vs. AL Detroit Tigers (0)

Game	Date	Score	Location	Time	Attendance
1	October 8	Detroit Tigers – 3, Chicago Cubs – 3 (12)	West Side Grounds	2:40	24,377
2	October 9	Detroit Tigers – 1, Chicago Cubs – 3	West Side Grounds	2:13	21,901
3	October 10	Detroit Tigers – 1, Chicago Cubs – 5	West Side Grounds	1:35	13,114
4	October 11	Chicago Cubs – 6, Detroit Tigers – 1	Bennett Park	1:45	11,306
5	October 12	Chicago Cubs – 2, Detroit Tigers – 0	Bennett Park	1:42	7,370

== Matchups ==
=== Game 1 ===
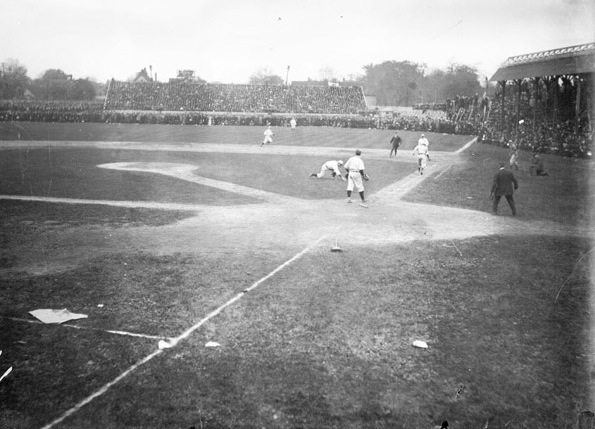
West Side Grounds during Game 1 on October 8

Tuesday, October 8, 1907 at West Side Grounds in Chicago, Illinois
Team	1	2	3	4	5	6	7	8	9	10	11	12	R	H	E
Detroit	0	0	0	0	0	0	0	3	0	0	0	0	3	9	3
Chicago	0	0	0	1	0	0	0	0	2	0	0	0	3	10	5
Boxscore

The Tigers scored three runs, largely due to three Cub errors, in the eighth inning and held a 3–1 lead going into the bottom of the ninth inning. The Cubs loaded the bases on a single, walk and infield error with one out. Detroit conceded a run on a ground ball for the second out, and Cub player-manager Frank Chance then pinch hit Del Howard for Joe Tinker. Wild Bill Donovan (25–4 in the regular season) struck him out, but the ball got away from catcher Boss Schmidt, allowing Harry Steinfeldt to score the tying run. Donovan got the next hitter, but the damage had been done. The teams then played three scoreless extra innings before the game was called on account of darkness and declared a tie, a World Series first.

Donovan struck out 12 Cubs in the game. Although that matched Ed Walsh's total in Game 3 against the Cubs in 1906, Walsh had done so in nine innings while Donovan only struck out 10 batters in the first nine innings of the game.

This was the closest the Tigers came to winning a game in this, their first Series. The Cubs committed five errors and struck out 12 times in the game, but nine stolen base attempts (seven successful) and five bunts (two for hits) set an aggressive offensive tone pressuring the Tigers for the rest of the series.

=== Game 2 ===
Cubs catcher Johnny Kling

Wednesday, October 9, 1907 at West Side Grounds in Chicago, Illinois
Team	1	2	3	4	5	6	7	8	9	R	H	E
Detroit	0	1	0	0	0	0	0	0	0	1	10	1
Chicago	0	1	0	2	0	0	0	0	X	3	8	1
WP: Jack Pfiester (1–0) LP: George Mullin (0–1); Boxscore

George Mullin, who both won and lost 20 games for Detroit in the regular season, and who had walked over 100 batters in each of his last five seasons, issued a bases-loaded walk in the bottom of the second, matching the Tiger run in the top of the inning and tying the score at 1–1. Chicago scored two more in the fourth on a single, sacrifice bunt, RBI single, stolen base and double to take a 3–1 lead. Jack Pfiester, while allowing ten hits, benefited from two double plays and three caught-stealings by battery-mate Johnny Kling and was the winning pitcher for the Cubs. Joe Tinker scored a run and drove in another in Game 2 after being pinch-hit for in the ninth inning of Game 1.

Hughie Jennings was the recipient of the first ejection issued in World Series history when he argued a caught stealing call by Hank O'Day against Germany Schaefer.

=== Game 3 ===
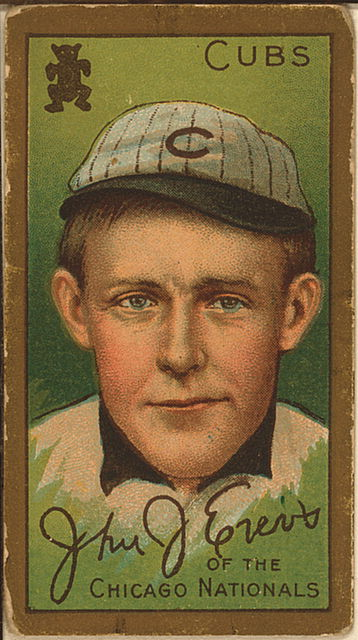
Cubs second baseman Johnny Evers

Thursday, October 10, 1907 at West Side Grounds in Chicago, Illinois
Team	1	2	3	4	5	6	7	8	9	R	H	E
Detroit	0	0	0	0	0	1	0	0	0	1	6	1
Chicago	0	1	0	3	1	0	0	0	X	5	10	1
WP: Ed Reulbach (1–0) LP: Ed Siever (0–1); Boxscore

Cub pitcher Ed Reulbach scattered six hits as Chicago jumped on Tiger starter Ed Siever for four runs on seven hits in only four innings en route to their second win. Johnny Evers had three hits, including two doubles, as the Cubs took a 2–0 lead in the Series.

=== Game 4 ===
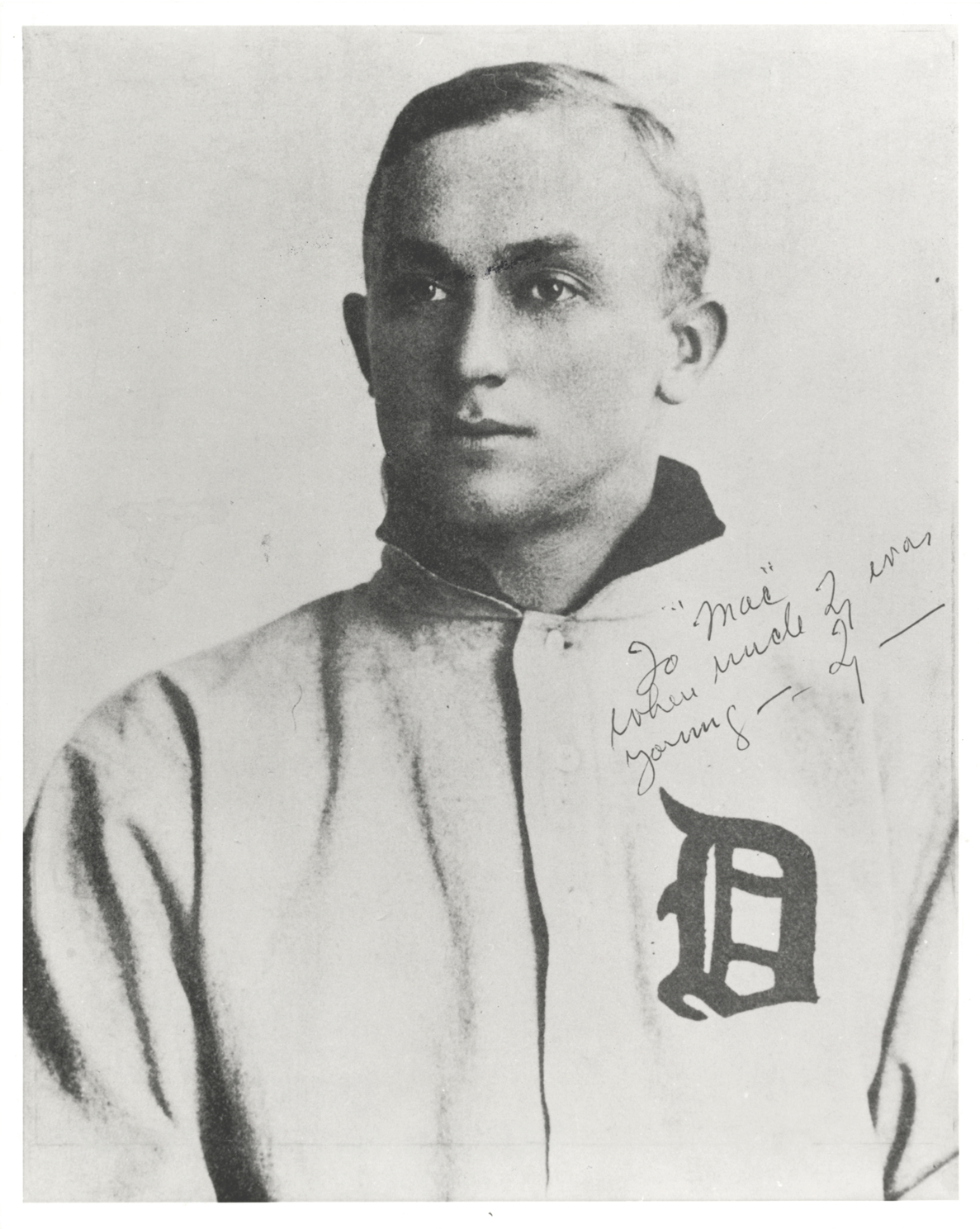
Tigers outfielder Ty Cobb

Friday, October 11, 1907 at Bennett Park in Detroit, Michigan
Team	1	2	3	4	5	6	7	8	9	R	H	E
Chicago	0	0	0	0	2	0	3	0	1	6	7	2
Detroit	0	0	0	1	0	0	0	0	0	1	5	2
WP: Orval Overall (1–0) LP: Wild Bill Donovan (0–1); Boxscore

In their first World Series home game, the Tigers took a 1–0 lead on a triple by their 20-year-old batting champion Ty Cobb and an RBI single by Claude Rossman in the bottom of the fourth, shortly before a rain delay in the top of the fifth. Soon after play resumed in the same inning, two Cubs reached base on an error and a walk. After Joe Tinker sacrificed, pitcher Orval Overall drove both runners home on a single to right. The Cubs scored three more in the seventh without the ball leaving the infield, on four bunts (two for hits) and two ground balls. Regular-season 23-game winner Overall was masterful after the rain delay, allowing only one hit in Detroit's final five innings, giving his Cubs a commanding 3–0 lead in the Series.

=== Game 5 ===
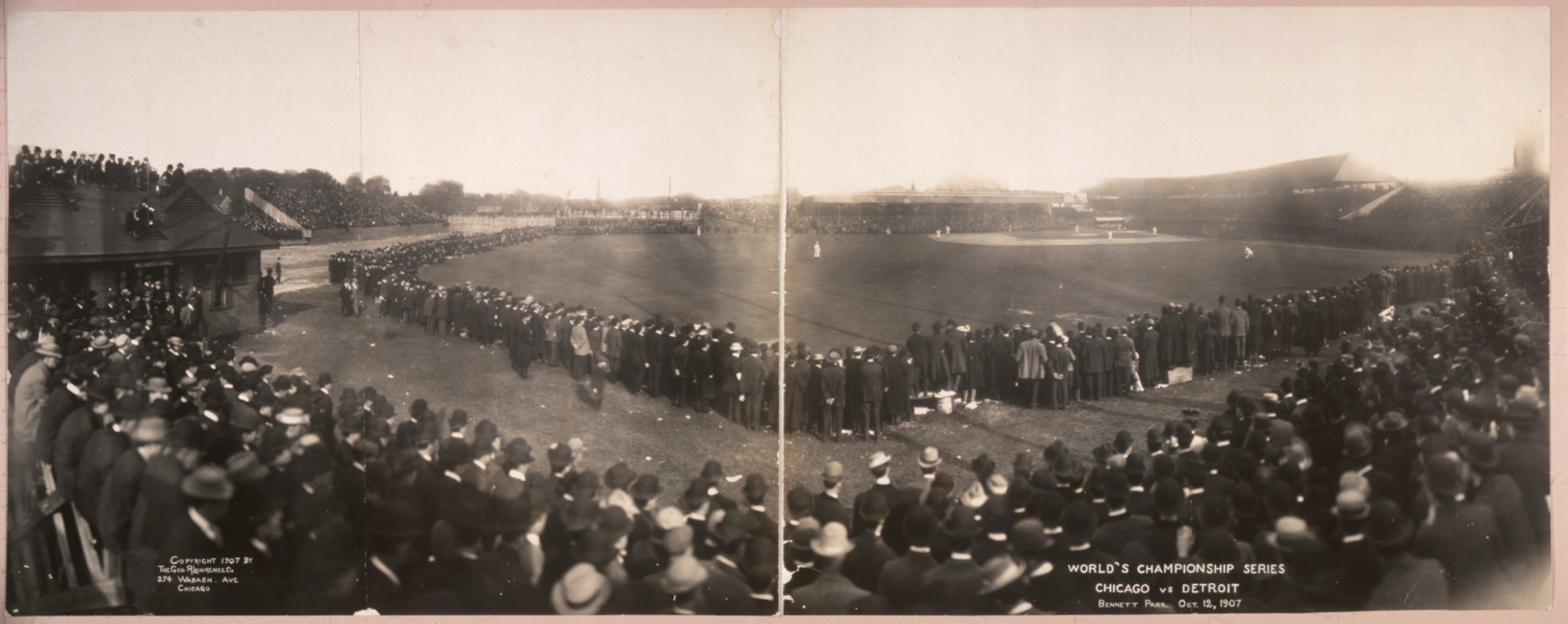
Bennett Park during Game 5 on October 12

Saturday, October 12, 1907 at Bennett Park in Detroit, Michigan
Team	1	2	3	4	5	6	7	8	9	R	H	E
Chicago	1	1	0	0	0	0	0	0	0	2	7	1
Detroit	0	0	0	0	0	0	0	0	0	0	7	2
WP: Mordecai Brown (1–0) LP: George Mullin (0–2); Boxscore

Chicago wrapped up the series with a 2–0 victory on "Three-fingered" Mordecai Brown's seven-hit shutout. The Cubs scored a run in the top of the first on a walk, stolen base and RBI single by Harry Steinfeldt and scored again in the second on an error, a single, a double-steal and a groundout to drive in the last run of the Series. Detroit had runners on second and third with one out in the last of the fourth, but left them there and never seriously threatened after that.

This Series was the closest to a four-game sweep until the first true Series sweep in 1914, when George Stallings' "miracle" Boston Braves surged from last place in mid-July to win the NL pennant and upset Connie Mack's Philadelphia Athletics in the Series.

Frank Chance remains, at 30, the youngest manager to win a World Series title, breaking the mark set by John McGraw who won the 1905 World Series with the New York Giants at the age of 32. Since then only one other manager has won a World Series under the age of 40, Tom Kelly of the Minnesota Twins won the 1987 World Series at the age of 37.

== Composite line score ==
1907 World Series (4–0–1): Chicago Cubs (N.L.) over Detroit Tigers (A.L.)

Team	1	2	3	4	5	6	7	8	9	10	11	12	R	H	E
Chicago Cubs	1	3	0	6	3	0	3	0	3	0	0	0	19	42	10
Detroit Tigers	0	1	0	1	0	1	0	3	0	0	0	0	6	37	9
Total attendance: 78,068 Average attendance: 15,614; Winning player's share: $2,143 Losing player's share: $1,946

== Aftermath ==
This was the first of four consecutive World Series defeats for the Tigers. The next year, they were beaten by the Cubs again, in 1909 they were defeated by the Pittsburgh Pirates in seven games, and in 1934 they were defeated by the St. Louis Cardinals, also in seven games. It would not be until 1935 that the Tigers would finally taste championship success.

== Sources ==
- Cohen, Richard M.; Neft, David S. (1990). The World Series: Complete Play-By-Play of Every Game, 1903–1989. New York: St. Martin's Press. pp. 18–22. ISBN 0-312-03960-3.
- Reichler, Joseph (1982). The Baseball Encyclopedia (5th ed.). Macmillan Publishing. p. 2115. ISBN 0-02-579010-2.
