= 1909 St. Louis Browns season =

Major League Baseball season

1909 St. Louis Browns
- League: American League
- Ballpark: Sportsman's Park
- City: St. Louis, Missouri
- Record: 61–89 (.407)
- League place: 7th place
- Owners: Robert Hedges
- Managers: Jimmy McAleer

The 1909 St. Louis Browns season was a season in American baseball. It involved the Browns finishing 7th place in the American League with a record of 61 wins and 89 losses.

== Regular season ==
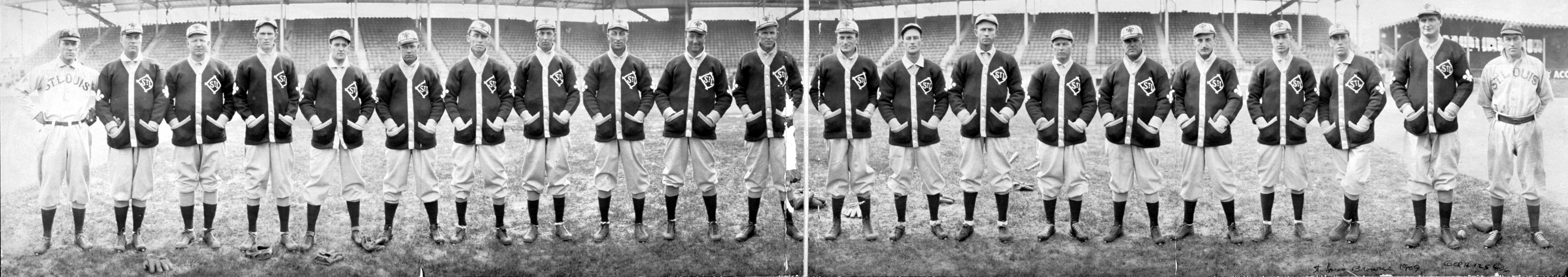

=== Season standings ===
American League
Team	W	L	Pct.	GB	Home	Road
Detroit Tigers	98	54	.645	—	57‍–‍19	41‍–‍35
Philadelphia Athletics	95	58	.621	3½	49‍–‍27	46‍–‍31
Boston Red Sox	88	63	.583	9½	47‍–‍28	41‍–‍35
Chicago White Sox	78	74	.513	20	42‍–‍34	36‍–‍40
New York Highlanders	74	77	.490	23½	41‍–‍35	33‍–‍42
Cleveland Naps	71	82	.464	27½	39‍–‍37	32‍–‍45
St. Louis Browns	61	89	.407	36	40‍–‍37	21‍–‍52
Washington Senators	42	110	.276	56	27‍–‍48	15‍–‍62

=== Record vs. opponents ===
1909 American League record Sources:
Team	BOS	CWS	CLE	DET	NYH	PHA	SLB	WSH
Boston	—	13–9–1	14–8	9–13	13–9	10–11	13–7	16–6
Chicago	9–13–1	—	8–13–1	6–15–2	14–8–1	12–10	10–12–1	19–3–1
Cleveland	8–14	13–8–1	—	8–14–1	8–14	9–13	14–8	11–11
Detroit	13–9	15–6–2	14–8–1	—	14–8	8–14	18–3–1	16–6–2
New York	9–13	8–14–1	14–8	8–14	—	8–14	13–8–1	14–6
Philadelphia	11–10	10–12	13–9	14–8	14–8	—	14–8	19–3
St. Louis	7–13	12–10–1	8–14	3–18–1	8–13–1	8–14	—	15–7–1
Washington	6–16	3–19–1	11–11	6–16–2	6–14	3–19	7–15–1	—

=== Roster ===
1909 St. Louis Browns
Roster
Pitchers: Bill Bailey; Dode Criss; Bill Dinneen; Jack Gilligan; Bill Grahame; Harry Howell; Ed Kusel; Bill McCorry; Barney Pelty; Jack Powell; Chuck Rose; Phil Stremmel; Rube Waddell	Catchers: Lou Criger; Bill Killefer; Wib Smith; Jim Stephens; Infielders: Hobe Ferris; Art Griggs; Tom Jones; Ham Patterson; Bobby Wallace; Jimmy Williams	Outfielders: Ned Crompton; Walt DeVoy; Roy Hartzell; Danny Hoffman; Jack McAleese; Claude Rossman; Al Schweitzer; Burt Shotton; George Stone	Manager: Jimmy McAleer

== Player stats ==
=== Batting ===
==== Starters by position ====
Note: Pos = Position; G = Games played; AB = At bats; H = Hits; Avg. = Batting average; HR = Home runs; RBI = Runs batted in

Pos	Player	G	AB	H	Avg.	HR	RBI
C	Lou Criger	74	212	36	.170	0	9
1B	Tom Jones	97	337	84	.249	0	29
2B	Jimmy Williams	110	374	73	.195	0	22
SS	Bobby Wallace	116	403	96	.238	0	35
3B	Hobe Ferris	148	556	120	.216	4	58
OF	Roy Hartzell	152	595	161	.271	0	32
OF	George Stone	83	310	89	.287	1	15
OF	Danny Hoffman	110	387	104	.269	2	26

==== Other batters ====
Note: G = Games played; AB = At bats; H = Hits; Avg. = Batting average; HR = Home runs; RBI = Runs batted in

Player	G	AB	H	Avg.	HR	RBI
Art Griggs	108	364	102	.280	0	43
Jack McAleese	85	267	57	.213	0	12
Jim Stephens	79	223	49	.220	3	18
Al Schweitzer	27	76	17	.224	0	2
Walt Devoy	19	69	17	.246	0	8
Ned Crompton	17	63	10	.159	0	2
Burt Shotton	17	61	16	.262	0	0
Ham Patterson	17	49	10	.204	0	5
Wib Smith	17	42	8	.190	0	2
Harry Howell	18	34	6	.176	0	3
Bill Killefer	11	29	4	.138	0	1
Claude Rossman	2	8	1	.125	0	0

=== Pitching ===
==== Starting pitchers ====
Note: G = Games pitched; IP = Innings pitched; W = Wins; L = Losses; ERA = Earned run average; SO = Strikeouts

Player	G	IP	W	L	ERA	SO
Jack Powell	34	239.0	12	16	2.11	82
Rube Waddell	31	220.1	11	14	2.37	141
Barney Pelty	27	199.1	11	11	2.30	88
Bill Dinneen	17	112.0	6	7	3.46	26
Chuck Rose	3	25.0	1	2	5.40	6
Ed Kusel	3	24.0	0	3	7.13	2
Jack Gilligan	3	23.0	1	2	5.48	4
Phil Stremmel	2	18.0	0	2	4.50	6
Bill McCorry	2	15.0	0	2	9.00	10

==== Other pitchers ====
Note: G = Games pitched; IP = Innings pitched; W = Wins; L = Losses; ERA = Earned run average; SO = Strikeouts

Player	G	IP	W	L	ERA	SO
Bill Bailey	32	199.0	9	10	2.44	114
Bill Grahame	34	187.1	8	14	3.12	82
Dode Criss	11	55.1	1	5	3.42	43
Harry Howell	10	37.1	1	1	3.13	16
