= 1909 Detroit Tigers season =

Major League Baseball season

1909 Detroit Tigers
- American League champions
- League: American League
- Ballpark: Bennett Park
- City: Detroit, Michigan
- Record: 98–54 (.645)
- League place: 1st
- Owners: William H. Yawkey and Frank Navin
- Managers: Hughie Jennings

The 1909 Detroit Tigers won the American League pennant with a record of 98–54, but lost to the Pittsburgh Pirates in the 1909 World Series, 4 games to 3. The season was their ninth since they were charter members of the American League in 1901. It was the third consecutive season in which they won the pennant but lost the World Series. Center fielder Ty Cobb won the Triple Crown and pitcher George Mullin led the league in wins (29) and winning percentage (.784).

== The players ==
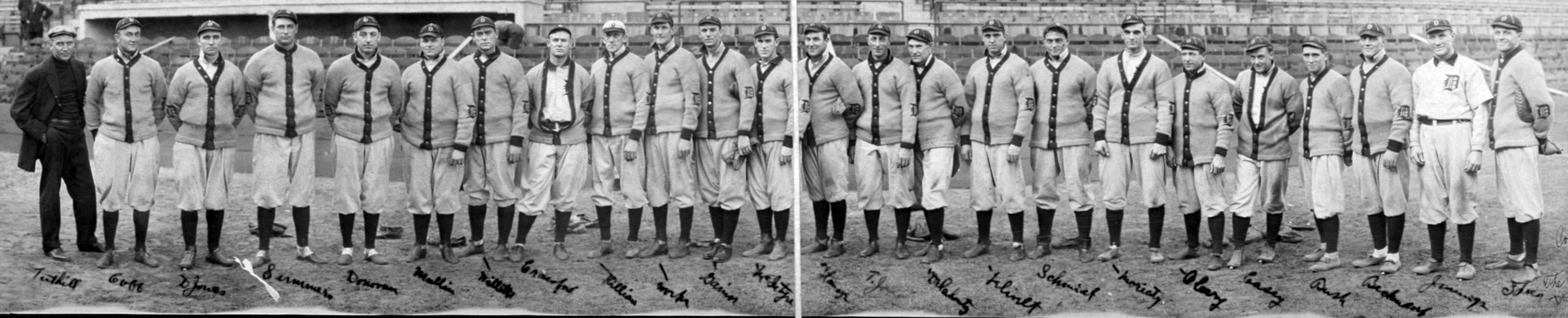

=== Catchers: Boss Schmidt and Oscar Stanage ===
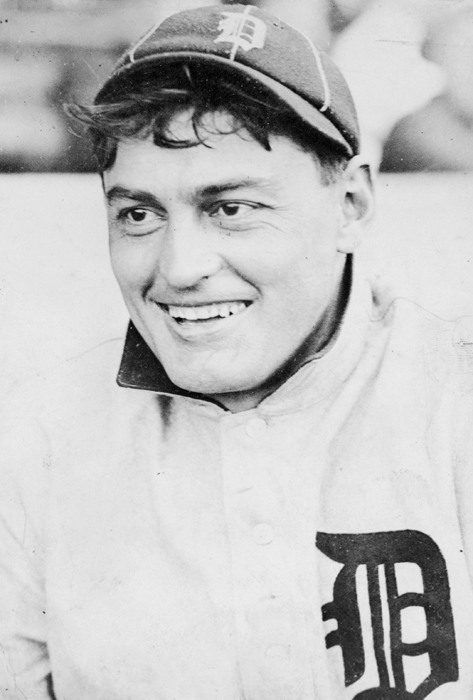
Boss Schmidt

Catching duties were split between Boss Schmidt (81 games) and Oscar Stanage (77 games).

Schmidt hit .265 in 1908, but his batting average dropped to .209 in 1909. As a young man, Schmidt worked in the coal mines and was a skilled brawler who fought an exhibition match with the heavyweight champion, Jack Johnson. Schmidt also beat Ty Cobb in at least two fights. In the second fight, Schmidt knocked Cobb unconscious but admired Cobb's resiliency, and the two became friends until Schmidt's death in 1932. Schmidt never wore shinguards and could force nails into the floor with his bare fists.

Stanage played for the Tigers from 1909 to 1920, catching 1,074 games for Detroit—second only to Bill Freehan in team history. Stanage was a weak hitter but one of the best defensive catchers of the dead-ball era. Known for his strong throwing arm, Stanage threw out more baserunners than any other catcher in the 1910s. Stanage still holds the American League record for most assists by a catcher, with 212 in 1911, and his career average of 1.29 assists per game is the fifth best in major league history. Stanage was not as skilled with the glove; his 41 errors in 1911 was the most by a catcher for the 20th Century.

=== Infield: Rossman, Schaefer, Bush, Moriarty, Delahanty and O'Leary ===
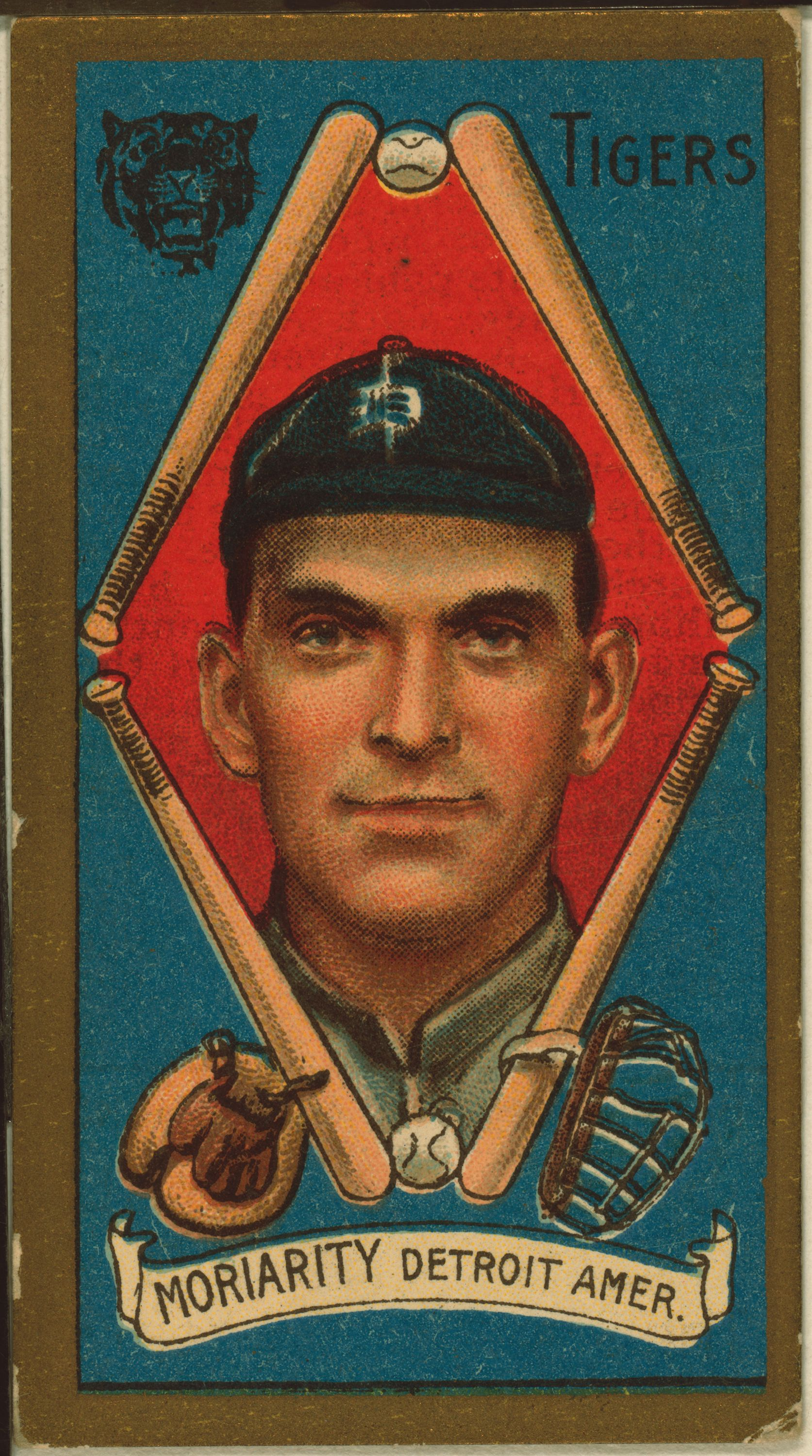
George Moriarty

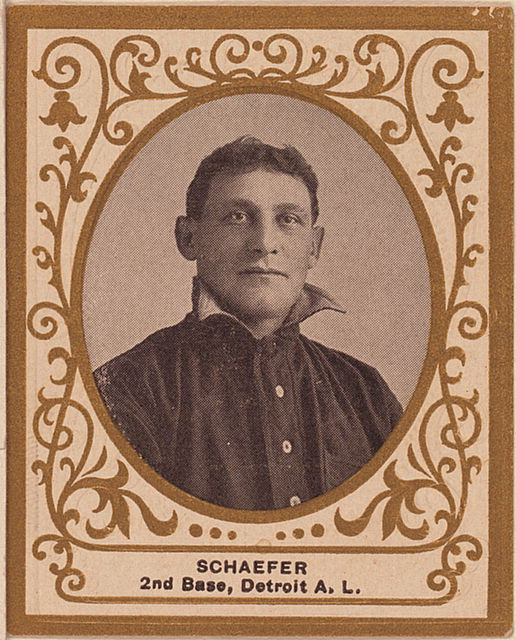
Germany Schaefer

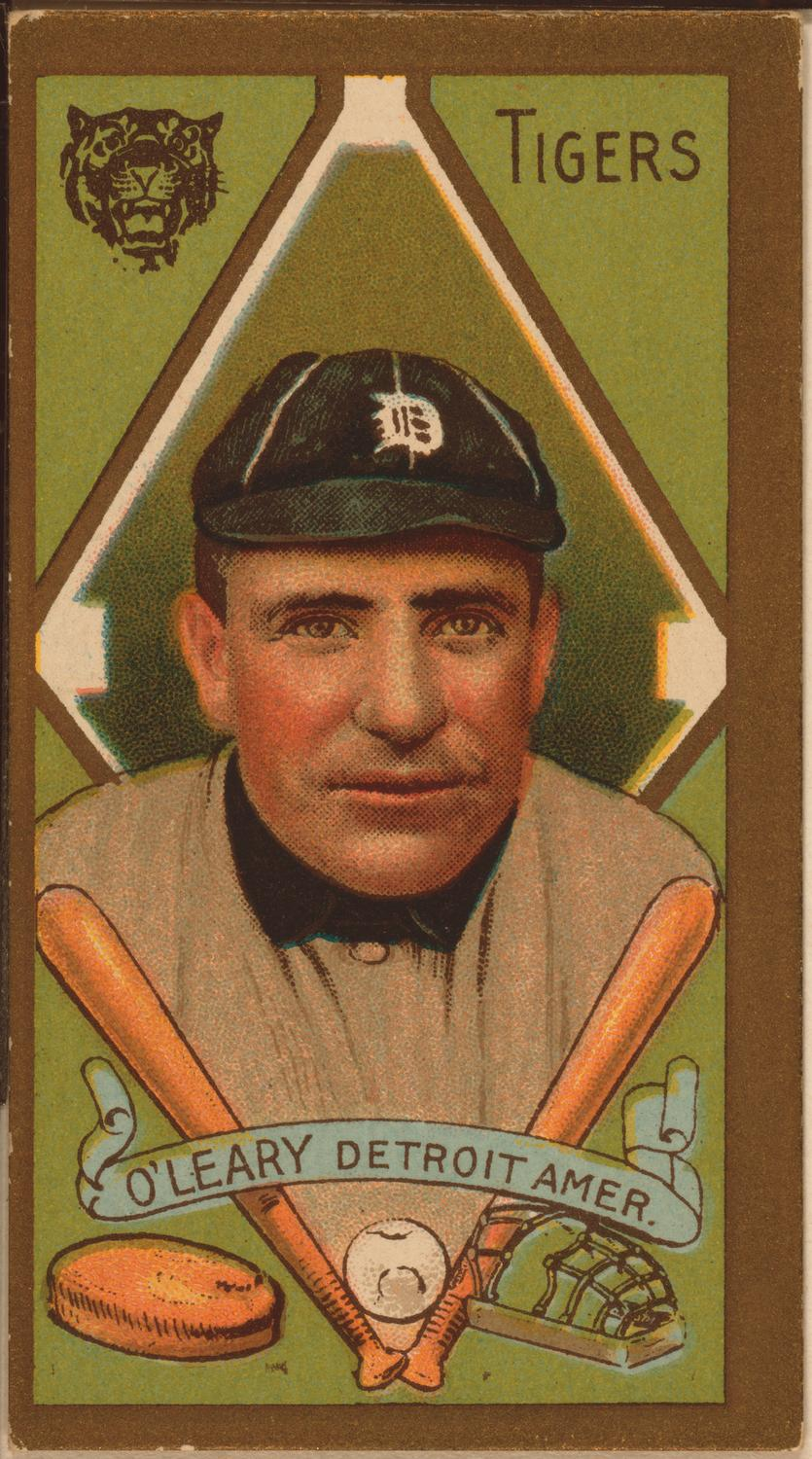
Charley O'Leary

First baseman Claude Rossman played for the Tigers from 1907 to 1909. In 1908, Rossman had the best year of his career with 33 doubles (2nd in the AL), 219 total bases (3rd in the AL), and 48 extra base hits (3rd in the AL). On August 20, 1909, the Tigers traded him to the St. Louis Browns for Tom Jones. Rossman had a peculiar emotional quirk where he sometimes froze and could not throw the ball when he became excited. Runners would lead off first to draw a throw from the pitcher, then run to second when Rossman froze. He was 28 when he played his last major league game and died at age 46 in a New York hospital for the insane where he had been a patient for several years.

Second baseman Germany Schaefer was traded by the Tigers to the Washington Senators during the 1909 season for Jim Delahanty. Schaefer is remembered more for his antics than for his performance on the field, including trying to steal first base (from second base) and, coming to bat in the rain with a raincoat and boots (to persuade the umpire to call the games). Schaefer was a pioneer of baseball clowning, and his vaudeville act with teammate Charley O'Leary was inspiration for the MGM musical film "Take Me Out to the Ball Game" starring Gene Kelly and Frank Sinatra. In 1919, a little over a year after Schaefer played his last game, he died at age 42 of tuberculosis at the sanitarium in Saranac Lake, New York.

Jim Delahanty took over at second base from Schaefer in 1909. He played all seven games of the 1909 World Series, batting .346 with 4 runs batted in.

Donie Bush was Detroit's starting shortstop for thirteen seasons from 1909 to 1921. As a rookie in 1909, he led the American League in walks (88), sacrifice hits (52), and assists by a shortstop (567), finished second in the AL in runs scored (114), was third in the AL in on-base percentage (.380), and set a major league record for stolen bases by a rookie (53) that stood for 89 years. His 52 sacrifice hits is the fourth highest single season total in major league history. He also led the AL in walks in five times and walked more than any other major league player from 1910 to 1919. Bush was also the surprise hitting star for Detroit in the World Series, hitting .318 with a .438 on-base percentage, picking up 7 hits, 5 bases on balls, 3 sacrifice hits, twice being hit by a pitch, scoring 5 runs and collecting 3 runs batted in. Bush played all seven game of the World Series at shortstop, collecting 9 putouts, 18 assists, and 3 double plays (but also committing 5 errors).

George Moriarty hit .273 and stole 34 bases as the team's third baseman. He later became one of the AL's most highly regarded umpires, officiating in the World Series in 1921, 1925, 1930, 1933 and 1935. Once while Moriarty was umpiring, Babe Ruth stepped out of the batter's box and asked Moriarty to spell his last name. When he had spelled it out, Ruth reportedly replied, "Just as I thought; only one I."

Charley O'Leary was Detroit's starting shortstop from 1904 to 1907 and became a backup shortstop and utility infielder from 1908 to 1912. In 1908, he shared third baseman duties with Moriarty and hit .202. On September 30, 1934, O'Leary pinch hit for the St. Louis Browns at age 51 and became one of the oldest players to collect a hit and score a run.

=== Outfield: McIntyre, Cobb, Crawford and Jones ===
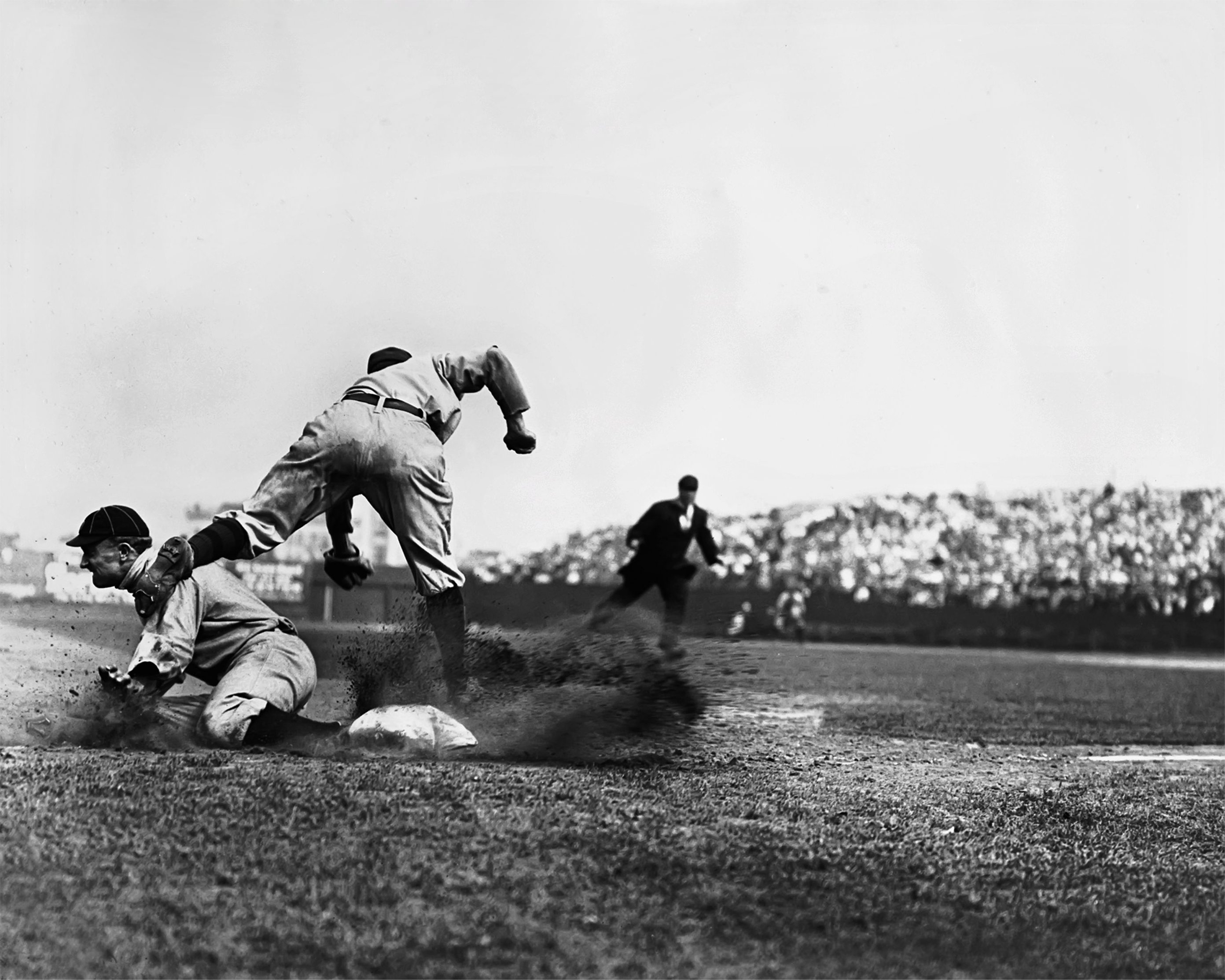
Cobb stealing third in 1909

In 1909, Ty Cobb won the Triple Crown with a .377 batting average‚ nine home runs (all inside the park)‚ and 107 runs batted in. (He not only led the AL in all three Triple Crown categories; he led all major league players in all three categories.) Cobb also led the major leagues with 216 hits and 76 stolen bases. Adding the stolen base title, Cobb was the only player ever to win a quadruple crown.

Right fielder Sam Crawford, known as "Wahoo Sam", was one of the greatest sluggers of the dead-ball era and still holds the major league records for triples in a career (309) and for inside-the-park home runs in a season (12) and a career (51). He finished his career with 2,961 hits and a .309 batting average. Crawford was among the AL leaders in hits, runs batted in, extra base hits, slugging percentage, and total bases every year for twelve consecutive years from 1905 to 1915. In 1909, Crawford hit .314 (4th in the AL) with a .452 slugging percentage (2nd in the AL), 97 runs batted in (2nd in the AL), 35 doubles (1st in the AL), 14 triples (2nd in the AL), 266 total bases (2nd in the AL), six home runs (3rd in the AL), 55 extra base hits (1st in the American League), and 30 stolen bases.

Left fielder Matty McIntyre played for Detroit from 1904 to 1910. His best season was 1908, when he led the AL in: plate appearances (672), times on base (258), runs (105), and singles (131). McIntyre is also remembered as the leader of the "anti-Cobb" clique on the Tigers during Cobb's early years. Early in Cobb's rookie season, Cobb went after a flyball in McIntyre's left field territory. By cutting in front, Cobb caused McIntyre to drop the ball, infuriating McIntyre. McIntyre and his cohorts led a prolonged hazing campaign, locking Cobb out of an empty washroom, flicking food at Cobb, and nailing his shoes to the clubhouse floor.

Davy Jones played for the Tigers from 1906 to 1912. With Cobb and Crawford solidly entrenched in the outfield, Jones was forced to battle for the third outfield spot with McIntyre each year from 1906 to 1910. As a speedy leadoff man, he was a reliable run scorer with Cobb and Crawford following him in the lineup. Jones' speed also made him a fine outfielder, with tremendous range. In 1907, he led the AL with a .357 on-base percentage and finished second in the AL with 101 runs. In his three World Series for the Tigers, Jones played in 18 games, had a .357 on-base percentage, scored 8 runs, and had a home run in the 1909 World Series against the Pittsburgh Pirates.

=== Pitching: Mullin, Willett, Summers, Killian, Donovan and Works ===
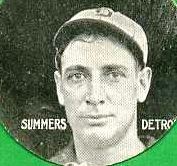

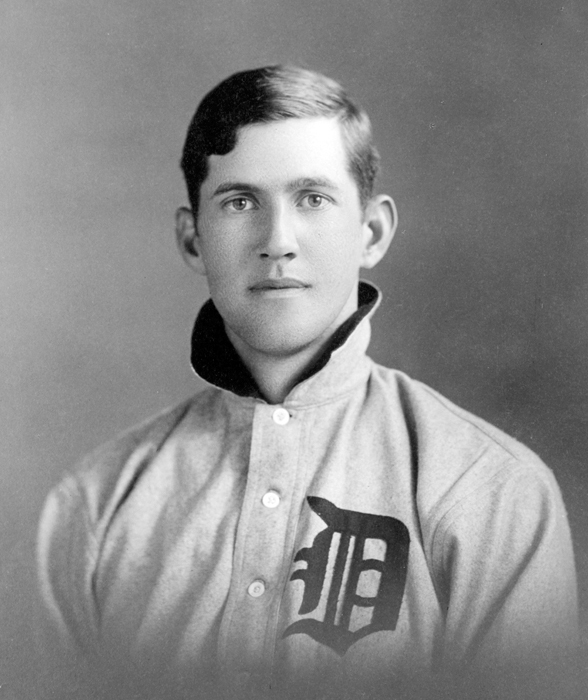
Ralph Works

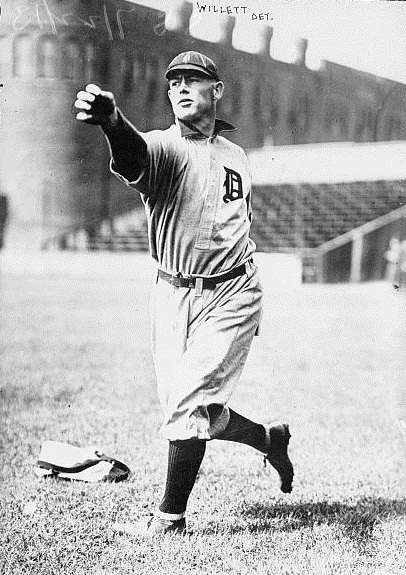
Ed Willett

George Mullin was the Tigers' leading pitcher in 1909, leading the major leagues with 29 wins and leading the AL with a .784 win percentage. Mullin holds the Tigers franchise record for innings pitched (in a career and in a season) and has the second most wins in the team's history. He also pitched the team's first no-hitter; had five 20-win seasons (including a league-leading 29 wins in 1909); helped the Tigers to three straight American League pennants (1907–09); twice hit over .310 as a batter; and ranks 7th in major league history for fielding assists by a pitcher.

Ed Killian led the team (and was 4th in the AL) with a 1.71 ERA. Twice a 20-game winner (including a 25–13 season in 1907), as of the end of the 2009 season Killian's career ERA of 2.38 is 26th-best in MLB history. Killian also holds the record for fewest home runs allowed, giving up only 9 in his entire career. At one point, Killian pitched a record 1001 innings (from September 1903 – August 1907) without allowing a home run.

Ed Willett had his best season in 1909 when he had a record of 21–10, ranking 3rd in the American League in wins and 5th in winning percentage (.677). He had an earned run average of 2.34 for the season and was among the AL leaders in games (41), innings (292 2/3), games started (34), complete games (25), bases on balls and hits allowed (88 and 239), as well as wild pitches (10) and hit batsmen (14).

Ed Summers had two great seasons for the Tigers, going 24–12 with a 1.64 ERA in his 1908 rookie season, and 19–9 with a 2.24 ERA in 1909. On September 25, 1908, Summers threw two complete game victories in a double header to help the Tigers clinch the AL pennant. On July 16, 1909, Summers pitched 18 scoreless innings of a tie game against the Washington Senators at Bennett Park.

Bill Donovan was the Tigers ace in 1907 with a 25–4 record (the best win percentage in Tigers' team history), but in 1909 he went 8–7 in 17 starts. On May 7, 1906, Donovan stole second base, third base, and home on the front end of a double steal and also hit a triple in the same game. In June 1923, Donovan died in a train wreck.

Ralph Works was a pitcher for Tigers from 1909 to 1912. Works was called "Judge" by teammates for his scholarly countenance. Works had career record of 24–24 with a 3.79 ERA. His best season was 1911 when he went 11–5 in 30 games for the Tigers. He ranked No. 5 in the American League in winning percentage (.688) in 1911, No. 7 in shutouts with 3 and No. 8 in games finished with 10. Works died in of a self-inflicted gunshot would in Pasadena, California in 1941 at age 53. He died with his wife in an apparent double suicide.

=== Player-manager Hughie Jennings ===
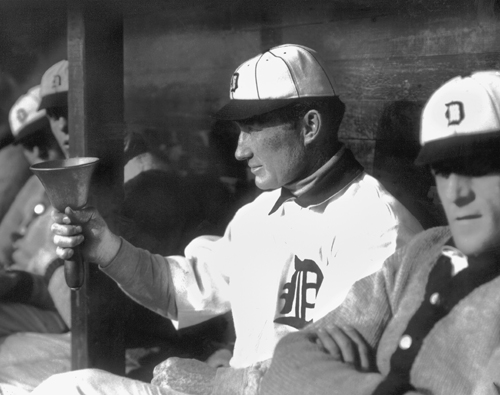
Hughie Jennings with horn in the Tigers dugout

Hughie "Ee-yah" Jennings led the Tigers to three consecutive American League pennants, in 1907–09. Jennings continued to manage the Tigers through the 1920 season, though his team never won another pennant. During his years as Detroit's manager, Jennings became famous for his antics, mostly in the third base coaching box, which variously included shouts of "Ee-Yah", and other whoops, whistles, horns, gyrations, jigs, and grass-plucking. The "Ee-Yah" whoop became his trademark and was accompanied with waves of both arms over his head and a sharp raising of his right knee. In 1907, he was suspended for taunting opponents with a tin whistle. The "Ee-Yah" shouts continued and became such a trademark that Jennings became known as Hughie "Ee-Yah" Jennings, and Detroit fans would shout "Eee-Yah" when Jennings would appear on the field. (See also Jack Smile, Ee-yah: The Life and Times of Hughie Jennings, Baseball Hall of Famer)

Beyond his on-field behavior, Jennings was recognized for his managerial abilities. Connie Mack described him as one of the three greatest managers in baseball history, alongside John McGraw and Joe McCarthy.

== Regular season ==
=== Season summary ===
The 1909 season was the third straight year the Tigers won the American League pennant. Their 1909 record of 98–54 was the team's best record to that point. Led by Ty Cobb, who won the Triple Crown and Sam Crawford, who led the league in doubles and extra base hits, they scored 66 more runs than any other team in the American League and outscored their opponents 666 to 493. They led the American League for most of the regular season, but remained in a close race with the Philadelphia Athletics, finally taking the pennant by 3½ games.

The 1909 Tigers' winning percentage ranks as the 3rd best in team history through 2010, as follows:

Best Seasons in Detroit Tigers History
| Rank | Year | Wins | Losses | Win % | Finish |
| 1 | 1934 | 101 | 53 | .656 | Lost 1934 World Series to Cardinals |
| 2 | 1915 | 100 | 54 | .649 | 2nd in AL behind Red Sox |
| 3 | 1909 | 98 | 54 | .645 | Lost 1909 World Series to Pirates |
| 4 | 1984 | 104 | 58 | .642 | Won 1984 World Series over Padres |
| 5 | 1968 | 103 | 59 | .636 | Won 1968 World Series over Cardinals |

=== Season highlights ===
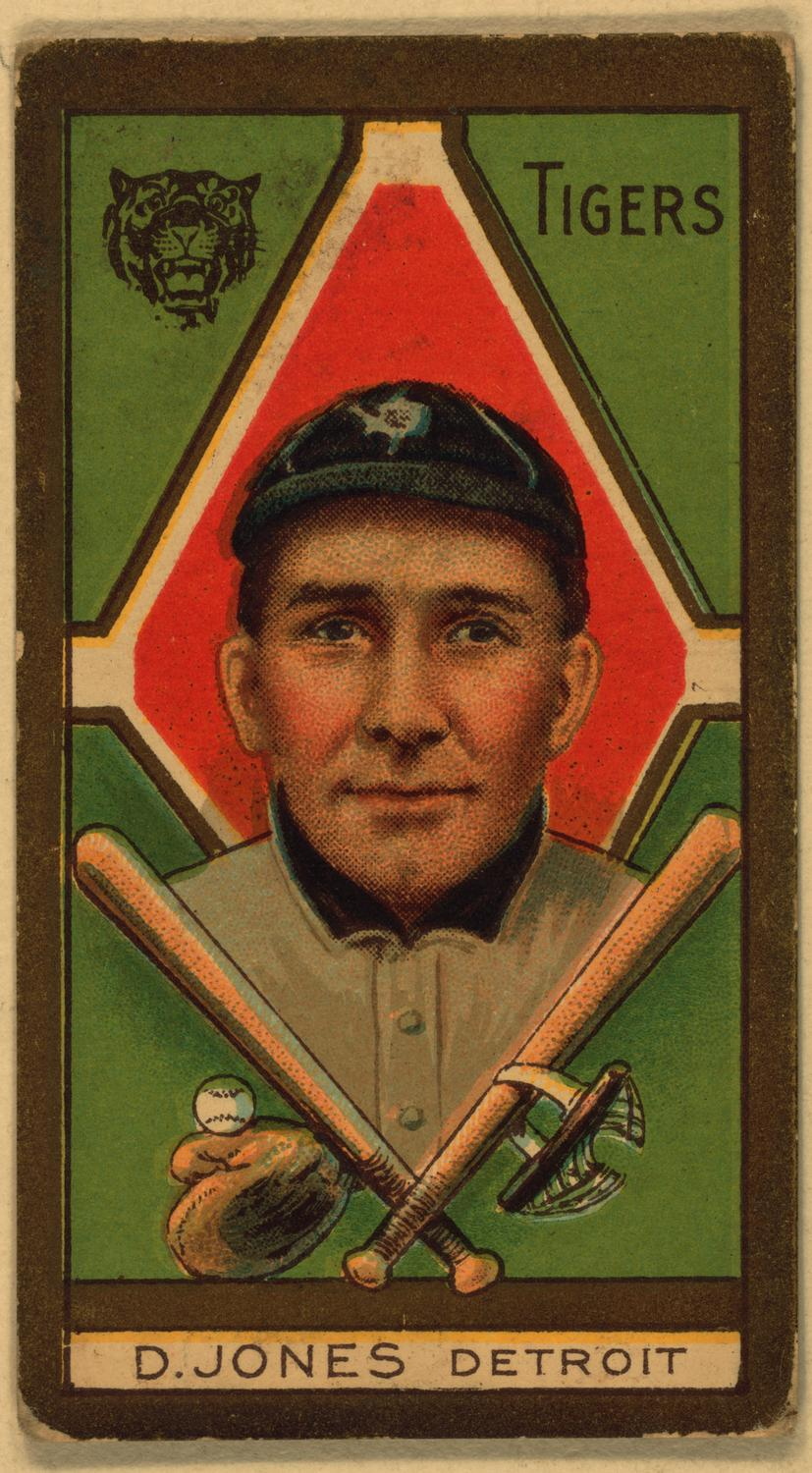
Davy Jones

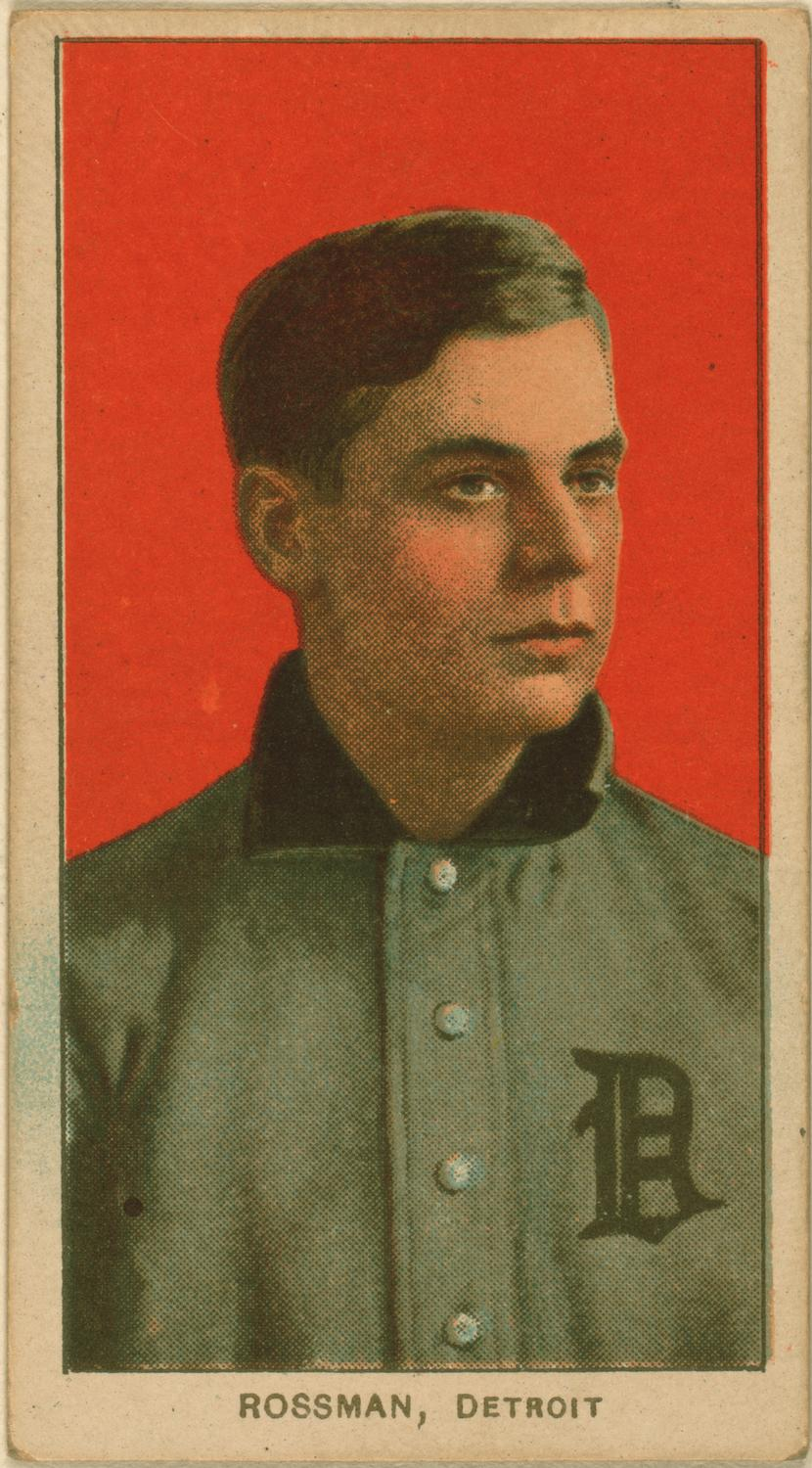
Claude Rossman

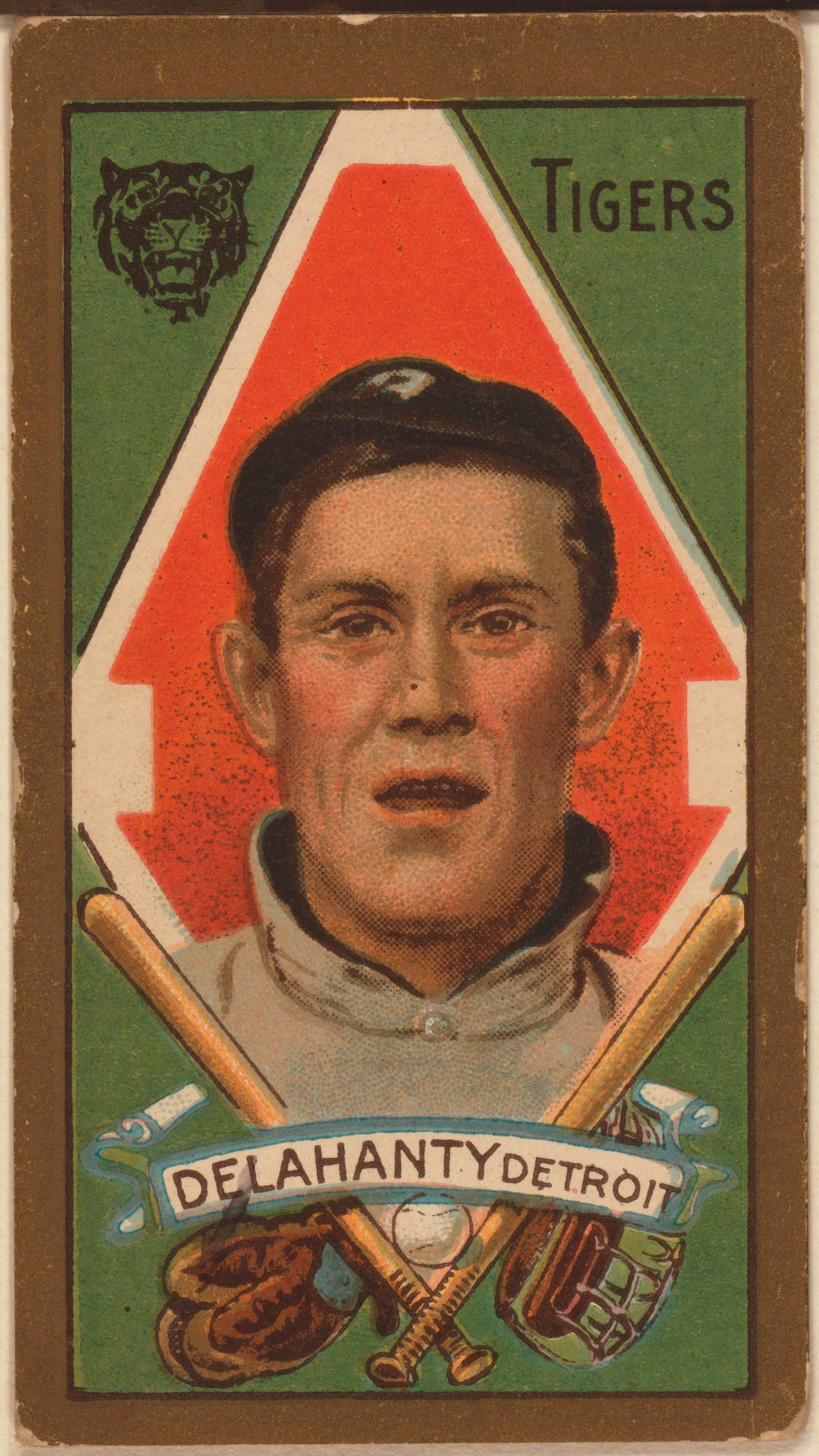
Jim Delahanty

- April 14: George Mullin pitches a 1-hit shutout as the Tigers beat the White Sox, 1–0, on Opening Day at Bennett Park.
- April 18: The Tigers announced plans to build a new concrete and steel stadium. The team won its fifth straight game to start the season, 5–0, as George Mullin got his second win, a 3–2 victory over Cleveland.
- May 2: The Tigers beat the White Sox, 6–5. Ty Cobb was ejected from a game for the first time. He tried stretching a double and was called out at third base.
- May 16: The Tigers lost, 3–2, to Boston. George Moriarty was tagged out in the 9th inning trying to steal home to end the game. After tagging Moriarty, Boston catcher Bill Carrigan spit tobacco on Moriarty‚ saying‚ "don't try that and pull that on a smart guy." Moriarty then flattened Carrigan. Both players were suspended for fighting.
- June 10: The Tigers beat the New York Highlanders, 2–1, as George Mullin won his 11th straight game. Mullin lost to the A's, 5–4, in his next start on June 15.
- June 22: The Tigers bought the rest of the vacant Bennett Field grounds as the site for a new baseball stadium.
- June 26: In Detroit‚ the Tigers beat the Browns and Rube Waddell‚ 6–2. It was the 8th straight game between the two teams‚ and the Tigers won all eight.
- July 15: Ty Cobb hit two inside-the-park homers to lead the Tigers to a double header sweep of the Senators. Detroit won‚ 9–5 and 7–0.
- July 16: At Bennett Field‚ Detroit and Washington played the longest scoreless game in AL history – 18 innings. Ed Summers pitched a complete game‚ holding the Senators to 7 hits‚ two walks (one intentional)‚ while striking out 10. The Senators' 30-year-old rookie‚ Bill "Dolly" Gray‚ allowed only one hit before leaving with an injury after 8 innings.
- July 22: The Tigers beat Boston, 6–0, as Ty Cobb stole second, third and home in the 7th inning‚ against pitcher Harry Wolter. In all, Cobb had three hits and four stolen bases. Ed Killian got the win for Detroit.
- August 20: The Browns and Tigers traded first baseman: Tom Jones went to Detroit for Claude Rossman.
- August 24: The Tigers beat the A's, 7–6. A's catcher Paddy Livingston threw out Ty Cobb trying to steal 3rd base during an intentional walk to Sam Crawford. Cobb intentionally spiked third baseman Frank "Home Run" Baker on his bare hand during the play‚ prompting howls of protest from the A's. A's manager Connie Mack complained to AL president Ban Johnson about Cobb's dirty play, and Cobb received a warning from Johnson.
- August 28: The Tigers beat New York, 2–1. The first six New York batters reached base safely‚ and two crossed the plate‚ but only one run counted. Engel hit a leadoff single and stayed on first base when Chase chopped a ball in the air and Engel thought it was a pop up. Engel was tagged out. Four more singles drove in one run but the Knight was called back to third base when a hit ball touched an umpire. Ty Cobb had a single‚ double, and triple for Detroit.
- September 2: Detroit beat Boston‚ 8–5‚ and completed a sweep of every series against visiting Eastern teams‚ winning their 14th game in a row. The Tigers regained first place by a half game.
- September 13: Ty Cobb hit his major league leading ninth home run in a 10–2 Detroit win over the Browns. All of Cobb's home runs in 1909 were inside-the-park. He was the only player in the 20th century to lead the league in home runs without hitting one out of the park. Only Sam Crawford (12 in 1901) hit more inside-the-park home runs in a year.
- September 18: Before 35‚409 in Philadelphia‚ the largest paid baseball attendance ever‚ the A's Chief Bender beat Detroit's Bill Donovan, 2–0, to keep the A's in the pennant race. The A's were 14–8 against Detroit in 1909‚ setting an AL record for most wins against the pennant winner.
- September 21: Detroit was shut out by Walter Johnson, 2–0.
- September 25: The Tigers swept the Highlanders in a double header, 2–1 and 10–4. During the second game, Detroit manager, Hughie Jennings, discovered that the Yankees were stealing the catcher's signs, using a telescope and sending signals to the batter by moving a crossbar in a hat advertisement in center field. Jennings sent the team trainer to investigate. The trainer destroyed the crossbar. In the off-season, the AL announced that a manager or player responsible for sign-tipping would be banned from the league for all time.

=== Season standings ===
American League
| Team | W | L | Pct. | GB | Home | Road |
|---|---|---|---|---|---|---|
| Detroit Tigers | 98 | 54 | .645 | — | 57‍–‍19 | 41‍–‍35 |
| Philadelphia Athletics | 95 | 58 | .621 | 3½ | 49‍–‍27 | 46‍–‍31 |
| Boston Red Sox | 88 | 63 | .583 | 9½ | 47‍–‍28 | 41‍–‍35 |
| Chicago White Sox | 78 | 74 | .513 | 20 | 42‍–‍34 | 36‍–‍40 |
| New York Highlanders | 74 | 77 | .490 | 23½ | 41‍–‍35 | 33‍–‍42 |
| Cleveland Naps | 71 | 82 | .464 | 27½ | 39‍–‍37 | 32‍–‍45 |
| St. Louis Browns | 61 | 89 | .407 | 36 | 40‍–‍37 | 21‍–‍52 |
| Washington Senators | 42 | 110 | .276 | 56 | 27‍–‍48 | 15‍–‍62 |

=== Record vs. opponents ===
1909 American League record Sources:
| Team | BOS | CWS | CLE | DET | NYH | PHA | SLB | WSH |
|---|---|---|---|---|---|---|---|---|
| Boston | — | 13–9–1 | 14–8 | 9–13 | 13–9 | 10–11 | 13–7 | 16–6 |
| Chicago | 9–13–1 | — | 8–13–1 | 6–15–2 | 14–8–1 | 12–10 | 10–12–1 | 19–3–1 |
| Cleveland | 8–14 | 13–8–1 | — | 8–14–1 | 8–14 | 9–13 | 14–8 | 11–11 |
| Detroit | 13–9 | 15–6–2 | 14–8–1 | — | 14–8 | 8–14 | 18–3–1 | 16–6–2 |
| New York | 9–13 | 8–14–1 | 14–8 | 8–14 | — | 8–14 | 13–8–1 | 14–6 |
| Philadelphia | 11–10 | 10–12 | 13–9 | 14–8 | 14–8 | — | 14–8 | 19–3 |
| St. Louis | 7–13 | 12–10–1 | 8–14 | 3–18–1 | 8–13–1 | 8–14 | — | 15–7–1 |
| Washington | 6–16 | 3–19–1 | 11–11 | 6–16–2 | 6–14 | 3–19 | 7–15–1 | — |

=== Roster ===
1909 Detroit Tigers
Roster
| Pitchers: Bill Donovan; Elijah Jones; Ed Killian; Ed Lafitte; Bill Lelivelt; George Mullin; Kid Speer; George Suggs; Ed Summers; Ed Willett; Ralph Works | Catchers: Heinie Beckendorf; Joe Casey; Boss Schmidt; Oscar Stanage; Infielders: Donie Bush; Jim Delahanty; Del Gainer; Hughie Jennings; Tom Jones; Red Killefer; George Moriarty; Charley O'Leary; Claude Rossman; Germany Schaefer | Outfielders: Ty Cobb; Sam Crawford; Davy Jones; Matty McIntyre | Manager: Hughie Jennings |

== Player stats ==
=== Batting ===
==== Starters by position ====
Note: Pos = Position; G = Games played; AB = At bats; H = Hits; Avg. = Batting average; HR = Home runs; RBI = Runs batted in

| Pos | Player | G | AB | H | Avg. | HR | RBI |
|---|---|---|---|---|---|---|---|
| C | Boss Schmidt | 84 | 253 | 53 | .209 | 1 | 28 |
| 1B | Claude Rossman | 82 | 287 | 75 | .261 | 0 | 39 |
| 2B | Germany Schaefer | 87 | 280 | 70 | .250 | 0 | 22 |
| 3B | George Moriarty | 133 | 473 | 129 | .273 | 1 | 39 |
| SS | Donie Bush | 157 | 532 | 145 | .273 | 0 | 33 |
| OF | Ty Cobb | 156 | 573 | 216 | .377 | 9 | 107 |
| OF | Sam Crawford | 156 | 589 | 185 | .314 | 6 | 97 |
| OF | Matty McIntyre | 125 | 476 | 116 | .244 | 1 | 34 |

==== Other batters ====
Note: G = Games played; AB = At bats; H = Hits; Avg. = Batting average; HR = Home runs; RBI = Runs batted in

| Player | G | AB | H | Avg. | HR | RBI |
|---|---|---|---|---|---|---|
| Charley O'Leary | 76 | 261 | 53 | .203 | 0 | 13 |
| Oscar Stanage | 77 | 252 | 66 | .262 | 0 | 21 |
| Davy Jones | 69 | 204 | 57 | .279 | 0 | 10 |
| Tom Jones | 44 | 153 | 43 | .281 | 0 | 18 |
| Jim Delahanty | 46 | 150 | 38 | .253 | 0 | 20 |
| Red Killefer | 23 | 61 | 17 | .279 | 1 | 4 |
| Heinie Beckendorf | 15 | 27 | 7 | .259 | 0 | 1 |
| Joe Casey | 3 | 5 | 0 | .000 | 0 | 0 |
| Del Gainer | 2 | 5 | 1 | .200 | 0 | 0 |
| Hughie Jennings | 2 | 4 | 2 | .500 | 0 | 0 |

Note: pitchers' batting statistics not included

=== Pitching ===
==== Starting pitchers ====
Note: G = Games pitched; IP = Innings pitched; W = Wins; L = Losses; ERA = Earned run average; SO = Strikeouts

| Player | G | IP | W | L | ERA | SO |
|---|---|---|---|---|---|---|
| George Mullin | 40 | 303.2 | 29 | 8 | 2.22 | 124 |
| Ed Willett | 41 | 292.2 | 21 | 10 | 2.34 | 89 |
| Ed Summers | 35 | 281.2 | 19 | 9 | 2.24 | 107 |
| Ed Killian | 25 | 173.1 | 11 | 9 | 1.71 | 54 |
| Bill Donovan | 21 | 140.1 | 8 | 7 | 2.31 | 76 |
| Elijah Jones | 2 | 10.0 | 1 | 1 | 2.70 | 2 |

==== Other pitchers ====
Note: G = Games pitched; IP = Innings pitched; W = Wins; L = Losses; ERA = Earned run average; SO = Strikeouts

| Player | G | IP | W | L | ERA | SO |
|---|---|---|---|---|---|---|
| Kid Speer | 12 | 76.1 | 4 | 4 | 2.83 | 12 |
| Ralph Works | 16 | 64.0 | 4 | 1 | 1.97 | 31 |
| George Suggs | 9 | 44.1 | 1 | 3 | 2.03 | 18 |
| Bill Lelivelt | 4 | 20.0 | 0 | 1 | 4.50 | 4 |
| Ed Lafitte | 3 | 14.0 | 0 | 1 | 3.86 | 11 |

== Postseason ==
=== World Series summary ===
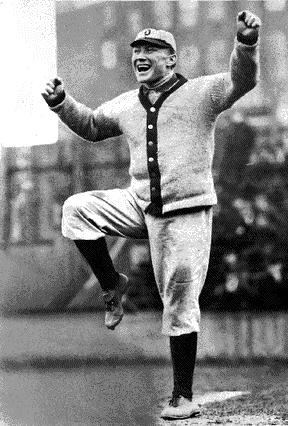

The Tigers faced the Pittsburgh Pirates‚ winners of 110 games‚ in the World Series. The Series matched AL batting champion Ty Cobb against NL batting champion Honus Wagner. Detroit gave up 18 stolen bases in 7 games to the Pirates.

In Game 1, 27-year-old rookie Babe Adams faced George Mullin. There were only 11 hits in the game‚ but Fred Clarke's home run led the Pirates to a 4–1 win.

In Game 2, Tigers' pitcher Bill Donovan led the team to a 7–2 win. Ty Cobb stole home as the Tigers scored three runs in the third inning.

In Game 3, the Pirates won, 8–6, behind three hits, three runs batted in and three stolen bases by Honus Wagner. Nick Maddox was the winner over Ed Summers.

In Game 4, George Mullin pitched a 5-hit shutout for Detroit, a 5–0 victory. Ty Cobb drove in two runs with a double. Mullin struck out ten batters, and the Pirates committed six errors.

In Game 5, Pirates' rookie Babe Adams threw his second complete-game victory, an 8–4 win. Sam Crawford hit a home run and a double, but Fred Clarke's three-run home run gave the win to Pittsburgh.

In Game 6, George Mullin led the Tigers to a 5–4 win. The World Series would go to a seventh game for the first time.

In Game 7, the Pirates won, 8–0, as Babe Adams got his third complete game victory of the 1909 World Series. Adams was the only rookie pitcher in the 20th century to win a World Series Game 7. (John Lackey did it in 2002.) Fred Clarke walked four times, and Honus Wagner drove in two runs. The Pirates and Tigers combined for 34 errors (18 by the Tigers), a World Series record.

| Game | Score | Date | Location | Attendance | Winning Pitcher | Losing Pitcher |
|---|---|---|---|---|---|---|
| 1 | Pirates – 4, Tigers – 1 | October 8 | Forbes Field | 29,264 | Babe Adams | George Mullin |
| 2 | Tigers – 7, Pirates – 2 | October 9 | Forbes Field | 30,915 | Bill Donovan | Howie Camnitz |
| 3 | Pirates – 8, Tigers – 6 | October 11 | Bennett Park | 18,277 | Nick Maddox | Ed Summers |
| 4 | Tigers – 5, Pirates – 0 | October 12 | Bennett Park | 17,036 | George Mullin | Lefty Leifield |
| 5 | Pirates – 8, Tigers – 4 | October 13 | Forbes Field | 21,706 | Babe Adams | Ed Summers |
| 6 | Tigers – 5, Pirates – 4 | October 14 | Bennett Park | 10,535 | George Mullin | Vic Willis |
| 7 | Pirates – 8, Tigers – 0 | October 16 | Bennett Park | 17,562 | Babe Adams | Bill Donovan |

=== Postseason player stats ===
==== Batting ====
Note: G = Games played; AB = At bats; H = Hits; Avg. = Batting average; HR = Home runs; RBI = Runs batted in

| Player | G | AB | H | Avg. | HR | RBI |
|---|---|---|---|---|---|---|
| Donie Bush | 7 | 22 | 7 | .318 | 0 | 3 |
| Ty Cobb | 7 | 26 | 6 | .231 | 0 | 5 |
| Sam Crawford | 7 | 28 | 7 | .250 | 1 | 4 |
| Jim Delahanty | 7 | 26 | 9 | .346 | 0 | 4 |
| Davy Jones | 7 | 30 | 7 | .233 | 1 | 1 |
| Tom Jones | 7 | 24 | 6 | .250 | 0 | 2 |
| George Moriarty | 7 | 22 | 6 | .273 | 0 | 1 |
| George Mullin | 6 | 16 | 3 | .188 | 0 | 0 |
| Boss Schmidt | 6 | 18 | 4 | .300 | 0 | 4 |
| Oscar Stanage | 2 | 5 | 1 | .200 | 0 | 2 |

==== Pitching ====
Note: G = Games pitched; IP = Innings pitched; W = Wins; L = Losses; ERA = Earned run average; SO = Strikeouts

| Player | G | IP | W | L | ERA | SO |
|---|---|---|---|---|---|---|
| George Mullin | 4 | 32 | 2 | 1 | 2.25 | 20 |
| Bill Donovan | 2 | 12 | 1 | 1 | 3.00 | 7 |
| Ed Willett | 2 | 7.2 | 0 | 0 | 0.00 | 1 |
| Ed Summers | 2 | 7.1 | 0 | 2 | 8.59 | 4 |
| Ralph Works | 1 | 2 | 0 | 0 | 9.00 | 2 |

=== The Cuban tour ===
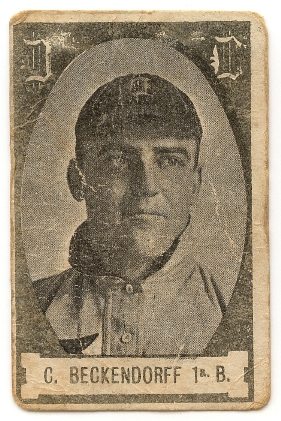
Heinie Beckendorf, Cabanas Cuban Baseball Card

In November 1909, a group of players from the 1909 Tigers (not including Ty Cobb or Sam Crawford) toured Cuba and played 12 exhibition games against two integrated Cuban teams, Habana and Almendares. The Cuban-American Major League Clubs Series drew wide attention in Cuba, where baseball was already very popular. Demonstrating the high level of play in Cuba, the Tigers lost 8 of the 12 games to the integrated Cuban baseball teams. To take advantage of the interest in the tour of the American baseball players, the Cabañas Company printed a series of baseball cards showing the members of the Almendares, Habana and Detroit baseball teams.

The Detroit roster, from a game played on November 18, 1909, consisted of the following players: Davy Jones, Charley O'Leary, George Moriarty, Matty McIntyre, Boss Schmidt, George Mullin, Heinie Beckendorf, Bill Hopke and W. Lelivelt. In that game, Cuban pitcher, Eustaquio "Bombin" Pedroso no hit the Tigers for 11 innings‚ finally winning‚ 2–1. The only run for Detroit came on an error in the 7th inning. A squeeze bunt against Bill Lelivelt in the 11th inning scored the winner. A collection was taken up for Pedroso and fans‚ including several Tigers‚ contributed 300 dollars.

== Awards and honors ==
=== League leaders ===
- Donie Bush:MLB walks leader (88)
- Donie Bush:sacrifice hits leader (88)
- Donie Bush:MLB games played leader (157)
- Ty Cobb: MLB batting title (.377)
- Ty Cobb: MLB batting triple crown
- Ty Cobb: MLB on-base percentage leader (.431)
- Ty Cobb: MLB slugging percentage leader (.517)
- Ty Cobb: MLB on-base plus slugging leader (.948)
- Ty Cobb: AL runs leader (116)
- Ty Cobb: MLB: hits leader (216)
- Ty Cobb: AL total bases leader (296)
- Ty Cobb: MLB home runs leader (9)
- Ty Cobb: MLB RBI leader (107)
- Ty Cobb: MLB stolen base leader (76)
- Ty Cobb: MLB runs created leader (126)
- Sam Crawford: AL doubles leader (35)
- Sam Crawford: MLB extra base hits leader (55)
- George Mullin: MLB wins leader (29)
- George Mullin: AL win percentage leader (.784)

=== Players ranking among Top 100 all time at position ===
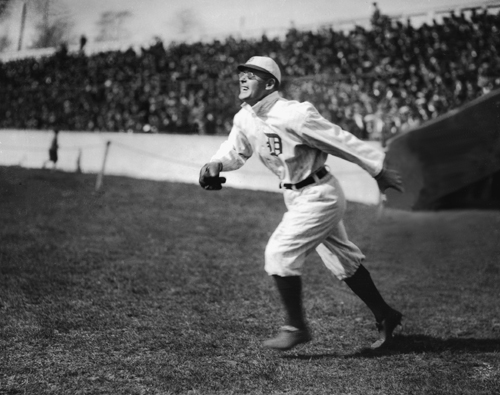
Sam Crawford pursues a fly ball

The following members of the 1909 Detroit Tigers are among the Top 100 of all time at their position, as ranked by The New Bill James Historical Baseball Abstract in 2001:

- Donie Bush: 51st best shortstop of all time
- Hughie Jennings: 18th best shortstop of all time
- Ty Cobb: 2nd best center fielder of all time
- Sam Crawford: 10th best right fielder of all time
