= Heinie Beckendorf =

American baseball player (1884–1949)

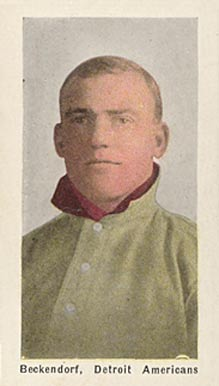
- 1910 Sporting Life baseball card
- Catcher
- Born: June 15, 1884; New York, New York, U.S.
- Died: September 15, 1949 (aged 65); Jackson Heights, New York, U.S.
- Batted: Right Threw: Right

MLB debut
- April 16, 1909, for the Detroit Tigers

Last MLB appearance
- September 10, 1910, for the Washington Senators

MLB statistics
- Batting average: .182
- Hits: 25
- Runs batted in: 13
- Stats at Baseball Reference

Teams
- Detroit Tigers (1909–1910); Washington Senators (1910)

Henry Ward "Heinie" Beckendorf (June 15, 1884 – September 15, 1949) was an American professional baseball catcher from 1903 to 1912. He played Major League Baseball for the Detroit Tigers in 1909 and 1910 and for the Washington Senators in 1910.

== Playing career ==
=== Early years ===
Beckendorf was born in 1884 in New York, New York. He played semi-professional baseball with the Williams Athletic Association in New York City and also played intercollegiate baseball for Everett College.

=== Minor leagues ===
Beckendorf began his professional baseball career in 1903 with the Kingston Colonials of the Hudson River League. He played for Kingston from 1903 through the early part of the 1906 season. In 1905, he helped Kingston win the Hudson River League pennant.

In early 1906, Beckendorf filed a claim with the National Board asking to be released from Kingston's reserve list. Beckendorf sought the release on the grounds that Kingston had failed to pay him all that was due and on the further ground that there was a non-reserve clause in his contract with the team. In April 1906, the Board sustained Beckendorf's claim on both bases and struck his name from Kington's reserve list.

In May 1906, after gaining his release from Kingston, Beckendorf signed with the Providence Grays of the Eastern League. He split the remainder of the 1906 season with the Grays and the Newark Sailors of the Eastern League. During the 1907 and 1908 seasons, Beckendorf played for the Scranton Miners in the New York State League. He helped Scranton win the New York State League pennant and was presented with a silver shaving set by his Scranton admirers.

=== Major League Baseball ===
==== Detroit Tigers ====
At the end of July 1908, Beckendorf was purchased from Scranton by the Detroit Tigers with the condition that he would report to Detroit in the spring. In November 1908, Sporting Life reported on Connie Mack's offer to purchase Beckendorf from Detroit: "Beckendorf, the other new catcher, so strongly impressed Connie Mack that he offered the Tigers $2,500 in cash and might have gone higher had there been any use. Mr. Mack told a local man that never in his experience had he seen a catcher get more out of his pitchers than this man Beckendorf did in a long examination he underwent, with the eye of that master looking on."

Beckendorf signed a contract with the Tigers in January 1909. At the time, Detroit Free Press writer Joe S. Jackson wrote: "The dope on Beckendorf for last year's work would indicate that he is something of a horse. He looks like a man who would thrive on hard labor." The Sporting Life called Beckendorf one of "the highest-touted backstops who have broken into fast company in recent years." In March 1909, the same publication reported on Beckendorf's prospects as follows:

"Beckendorf in particular seems to have the making of a sure big leaguer. While his batting does not promise much, he has learned considerable from Hughey Jennings in this respect. His throwing is sensational, his demeanor behind the bat inspiring and his fleetness of foot considerable in a chap so stockily built. In general appearance he reminds one very much of Spencer, of Boston, as he looked when he first entered the league. At that time, it will be recalled, he had the build of a strong, sturdy youngster, the rolls of adipose tissue for which he has been of late noted having been added as the accompaniment of play in the big league."

Beckendorf made his major league debut with the Tigers on April 16, 1909. He appeared in 15 games for the 1909 Tigers, compiling a .259 batting average in 27 at bats. Although the Tigers won the American League pennant in 1909, there is no record of Beckendorf having appeared in the 1909 World Series.

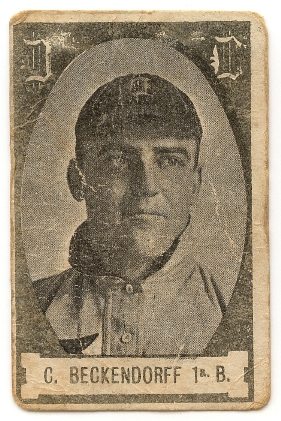
1908 Cabanas Cuban baseball card for Beckendorf

In November 1909, Beckendorf was among a group of players from the 1909 Tigers that toured Cuba and played 12 exhibition games against two integrated Cuban teams, Habana and Almendares. He alternated as a catcher and right fielder during the Cuban tour. The Cabañas Company printed a series of baseball cards showing the members of the Almendares, Habana and Detroit baseball teams. Beckendorf's Cabañas card is displayed to the right.

Beckendorf began the 1910 season with the Tigers. In March 1919, Beckendorf's photograph was featured on the front page of Sporting Life. He appeared in only three games for the 1910 Tigers, compiling a .429 batting average in seven at bats.

==== Washington Senators ====
In June 1910, Beckendorf was purchased for the balance of the 1910 season by the Washington Senators from the Tigers. He appeared in 37 games for the 1910 Senators and compiled a .146 batting average in 103 at bats. Beckendorf reportedly caught three of the eight shutouts thrown by Walter Johnson in 1910. In August 1910, Beckendorf's "right thumb was badly damaged by one of Dolly Gray's fast ones." Beckendorf tried to come back, but re-injured his thumb in the first inning of a game pitched by Walter Johnson. Sporting Life noted that "Henry's hands were hardly equal to the punishment inflicted by Johnson's speed." Beckendorf appeared in his final major league game at age 26 on September 10, 1910, for the Senators. Shortly thereafter, he was furloughed by Washington manager Jimmy McAleer for the remainder of the season.

==== Major league totals ====
In 55 major league games (53 as a catcher), Beckendorf compiled a .182 batting average with no home runs and 13 RBIs. His talent as a catcher brought him to the major leagues. His 1910 fielding percentage of .988 was 20 points above league average, and his range factor of 6.39 was 25 points higher than league average. However, he was not a strong batter; his 1910 batting average of .146 was 81 points below league average, and his .173 slugging percentage was 143 points lower than league average.

=== Minor leagues ===
Beckendorf reverted to the Detroit Tigers after the 1910 season. He attended spring training with the Tigers in 1911. He reported overweight but lost 16 pounds during the spring. E. A. Batchelor of the Detroit Free Press wrote at the time that Beckendorf led everyone "in ginger," was a mimic of manager Hughie Jennings' voice, entertained all with his diving stunts in the pool, and was "the personification of pepper and hard work." Batchelor added: "Everybody likes Beck and Beck likes everybody, so he was much sought as a companion by those who wished to enjoy life to the fullest. He always was ready for a lark and never lost any legitimate fun, even at the cost of keeping in condition."

Nevertheless, Beckendorf did not make the Tigers roster and was sent to the Buffalo Bisons of the Eastern League for the 1911 season. In 1912, he played for the Providence Grays in the International League.

== Family and death ==
On January 6, 1910, Beckendorf was married to Rose Mallon of Columbus Avenue, New York City. The two were childhood friends in New York. At the time, the Detroit Free Press reported that news of the wedding cast a "pall of gloom ... [f]or be it known that Mr. Beckendorf is there strong with the fair sex, and was much admired of many of Detroit's fairest daughters." At the time of the 1920 U.S. Census, the couple was living on 96th Street in Manhattan; Beckendorf listed his profession at the time as "none."

Beckendorf died in 1949 at age 65 in Jackson Heights, New York. He was buried at Long Island National Cemetery in Farmingdale, New York.
