= 1909 New York Highlanders season =

Baseball team season

1909 New York Highlanders
- League: American League
- Ballpark: Hilltop Park
- City: New York City, New York
- Record: 74–77 (.490)
- League place: 5th
- Owners: William Devery and Frank Farrell
- Managers: George Stallings

The 1909 New York Highlanders season saw the team finishing with a total of 74 wins and 77 losses, coming in fifth in the American League.

New York was managed by George Stallings, the team's fourth manager in as many years. Games were played at Hilltop Park. The alternate and equally unofficial nickname, "Yankees", was being used more and more frequently by the media. The eventually-famous curving "NY" logo appeared for the first time, on the sleeve and cap of the uniform.

== Regular season ==
=== Season standings ===
American League
Team	W	L	Pct.	GB	Home	Road
Detroit Tigers	98	54	.645	—	57‍–‍19	41‍–‍35
Philadelphia Athletics	95	58	.621	3½	49‍–‍27	46‍–‍31
Boston Red Sox	88	63	.583	9½	47‍–‍28	41‍–‍35
Chicago White Sox	78	74	.513	20	42‍–‍34	36‍–‍40
New York Highlanders	74	77	.490	23½	41‍–‍35	33‍–‍42
Cleveland Naps	71	82	.464	27½	39‍–‍37	32‍–‍45
St. Louis Browns	61	89	.407	36	40‍–‍37	21‍–‍52
Washington Senators	42	110	.276	56	27‍–‍48	15‍–‍62

=== Record vs. opponents ===
1909 American League record Sources:
Team	BOS	CWS	CLE	DET	NYH	PHA	SLB	WSH
Boston	—	13–9–1	14–8	9–13	13–9	10–11	13–7	16–6
Chicago	9–13–1	—	8–13–1	6–15–2	14–8–1	12–10	10–12–1	19–3–1
Cleveland	8–14	13–8–1	—	8–14–1	8–14	9–13	14–8	11–11
Detroit	13–9	15–6–2	14–8–1	—	14–8	8–14	18–3–1	16–6–2
New York	9–13	8–14–1	14–8	8–14	—	8–14	13–8–1	14–6
Philadelphia	11–10	10–12	13–9	14–8	14–8	—	14–8	19–3
St. Louis	7–13	12–10–1	8–14	3–18–1	8–13–1	8–14	—	15–7–1
Washington	6–16	3–19–1	11–11	6–16–2	6–14	3–19	7–15–1	—

=== Roster ===
1909 New York Highlanders
Roster
Pitchers: King Brockett; Dick Carroll; Jack Chesbro; Slow Joe Doyle; Russ Ford; Tom Hughes; Joe Lake; Rube Manning; Doc Newton; Jack Quinn; Butch Schmidt; Jack Warhop; Pete Wilson	Catchers: Walter Blair; Red Kleinow; Ed Sweeney; Infielders: Jimmy Austin; Neal Ball; Hal Chase; Kid Elberfeld; Earle Gardner; John Knight; Frank LaPorte; George McConnell; Al Orth; Eddie Tiemeyer; Bobby Vaughn; Jack Wanner; Joe Ward	Outfielders: Birdie Cree; Ray Demmitt; Clyde Engle; Charlie Hemphill; Willie Keeler; Other positions: Irish McIlveen	Manager: George Stallings; Coaches: Duke Farrell

== Player stats ==
=== Batting ===
==== Starters by position ====
Note: Pos = Position; G = Games played; AB = At bats; H = Hits; Avg. = Batting average; HR = Home runs; RBI = Runs batted in

Pos	Player	G	AB	H	Avg.	HR	RBI
C	Red Kleinow	78	206	47	.228	0	15
1B	Hal Chase	118	474	134	.283	4	63
2B	Frank LaPorte	89	309	92	.298	0	31
SS	John Knight	116	360	85	.236	0	40
3B	Jimmy Austin	136	437	101	.231	1	39
OF	Willie Keeler	99	360	95	.264	1	32
OF	Ray Demmitt	123	427	105	.246	4	30
OF	Clyde Engle	135	492	137	.278	3	71

==== Other batters ====
Note: G = Games played; AB = At bats; H = Hits; Avg. = Batting average; HR = Home runs; RBI = Runs batted in

Player	G	AB	H	Avg.	HR	RBI
Kid Elberfeld	106	379	90	.237	0	26
Birdie Cree	104	343	90	.262	2	27
Charlie Hemphill	73	181	44	.243	0	10
Ed Sweeney	67	176	47	.267	0	21
Walter Blair	42	110	23	.209	0	11
Earle Gardner	22	85	28	.329	0	15
George McConnell	13	43	9	.209	0	5
Al Orth	22	34	9	.265	0	5
Neal Ball	8	29	6	.207	0	3
Joe Ward	9	28	5	.179	0	0
Bobby Vaughn	5	14	2	.143	0	0
Eddie Tiemeyer	3	8	3	.375	0	0
Jack Wanner	3	8	1	.125	0	0
Irish McIlveen	4	3	0	.000	0	0

=== Pitching ===
==== Starting pitchers ====
Note: G = Games pitched; IP = Innings pitched; W = Wins; L = Losses; ERA = Earned run average; SO = Strikeouts

Player	G	IP	W	L	ERA	SO
Jack Warhop	36	243.1	13	15	2.40	95
Joe Lake	31	215.1	14	11	1.88	117
Rube Manning	26	173.0	7	11	3.17	71
King Brockett	26	170.0	10	8	2.12	70
Slow Joe Doyle	17	125.2	8	6	2.58	57
Pete Wilson	14	93.2	6	5	3.17	44
Doc Newton	4	22.1	0	3	2.82	11
Al Orth	1	3.0	0	0	12.00	1

==== Other pitchers ====
Note: G = Games pitched; IP = Innings pitched; W = Wins; L = Losses; ERA = Earned run average; SO = Strikeouts

Player	G	IP	W	L	ERA	SO
Tom Hughes	24	118.2	7	8	2.65	69
Jack Quinn	23	118.2	9	5	1.97	36
Jack Chesbro	9	49.2	0	4	6.34	17
Dick Carroll	2	5.0	0	0	3.60	1
George McConnell	2	4.0	0	1	2.25	4

==== Relief pitchers ====
Note: G = Games pitched; W = Wins; L = Losses; SV = Saves; ERA = Earned run average; SO = Strikeouts

Player	G	W	L	SV	ERA	SO
Butch Schmidt	1	0	0	0	7.20	2
Russ Ford	1	0	0	0	9.00	2
