= Richard Carroll =

Richard Carroll may refer to:

- Richard Carroll (politician) (born 1956), United States politician and member of the Democratic Party
- Rick Carroll (1946–1989), program director for radio station KROQ-FM in Los Angeles, California
- Dick Carroll (1888–1952), Canadian ice hockey coach
- Dick Carroll (baseball) (1884–1945), Major League Baseball pitcher
