= Bill Lelivelt =

American baseball player (1884–1968)

- Image from Chicago Daily News negatives collection, Chicago History Museum
- Pitcher
- Born: October 21, 1884; Amsterdam, Netherlands
- Died: February 14, 1968 (aged 83); Chicago, Illinois, U.S.
- Batted: Right Threw: Right

MLB debut
- July 19, 1909, for the Detroit Tigers

Last MLB appearance
- May 6, 1910, for the Detroit Tigers

MLB statistics
- Win–loss record: 0–2
- Earned run average: 3.41
- Strikeouts: 6
- Stats at Baseball Reference

Teams
- Detroit Tigers (1909–1910)

William John Lelivelt (October 21, 1884 – February 14, 1968) was a Dutch professional baseball pitcher. He played Major League Baseball for the Detroit Tigers in 1909 and 1910. He appeared in five major league games and compiled an 0–2 record in 29 innings pitched with an earned run average (ERA) of 3.41.

== Early years ==
Lelivelt was born in Amsterdam on 21 October 1884 as Willem Johan Lelivelt. His father Franciscus Zacharias Lelivelt (later: Frank) came from Groessen, his mother Theodora Mattijssen (later: Dora) from Renkum. They married in Amsterdam on 19 June 1884, and emigrated in 1887 to the USA. At the time of the 1900 U.S. Census, the family was living at 586 S. Spaulding Avenue in Chicago.

== Professional baseball ==
=== Minor leagues ===
Lelivelt began his professional baseball career playing for the Davenport Riversides of the Illinois–Indiana–Iowa League (Three-I League) from 1905 to 1906. He began the 1907 season with the Clinton Infants of the Three-I League and next played for the Decatur Commodores in the same Three-I League from 1907 to 1908. He compiled a 16–8 record for Decatur in 1908.

=== Detroit Tigers ===
Lelivelt began the 1909 season with the Mobile Sea Gulls of the Southern Association. On July 13, 1909, he was traded by Mobile to the Detroit Tigers in exchange for Frank Allen, George Suggs and $2,800. He made his major league debut in Detroit on July 19, 1909, a 5–3 loss to New York. He appeared in four games for the 1909 Tigers, two as a starter, and compiled an 0–1 record and 4.50 ERA. Although the Tigers won the American League pennant in 1909, there is no record of Lelivelt having appeared in the 1909 World Series.

In November 1909, Lelivelt was part of a group of Tigers players that toured Cuba and played 12 exhibition games against two integrated Cuban teams, Habana and Almendares. Lelivelt allowed only five hits in a 2–1 loss to the Almendares team in late November. The Cabañas Company printed a series of baseball cards showing the members of the Almendares, Habana and Detroit baseball teams. Lelivelt's Cabañas baseball card is pictured above and to the right.

On May 6, 1910, Lelivelt appeared in his last major league game, a 4–0 loss to the Chicago White Sox. Although Lelivelt took the loss, he allowed only two runs in the first eight innings, and Joe S. Jackson wrote in the Detroit Free Press that Lelivelt pitched an excellent game.

=== Minor leagues ===
Lellivelt spent the remainder of the 1910 season playing for the Minneapolis Millers (American Association), compiling an 8–7 record. He played four more years in professional baseball for the Montgomery Billikens (1911), Minneapolis Millers (1912), and Springfield Watchmakers (1913–1914). He pitched a no-hitter for the Millers in August 1912.

== Family and later years ==
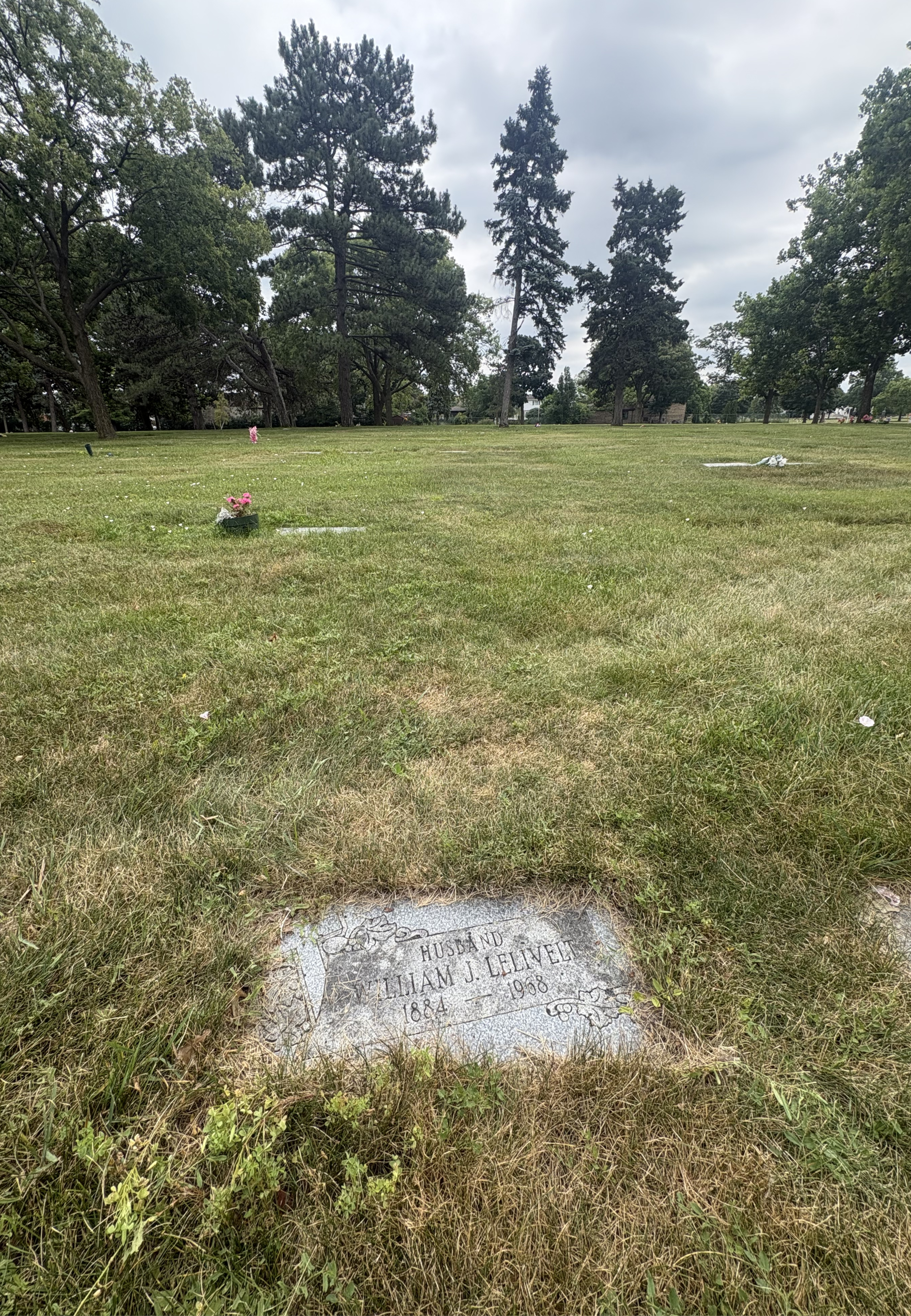
Lelivelt's grave at St. Adalbert Cemetery

Lelivelt's younger brother Jack Lelivelt was an outfielder in Major League Baseball from 1909 to 1914.

In September 1918, Lelivelt was employed by the City of Chicago. He continued to be in the employ of the City of Chicago in 1942.

Lelivelt died in February 1968. He was buried at St. Adalbert Cemetery in Niles, Illinois.
