= Edward A. Batchelor =

American sportswriter and editor (1883–1968)

- Batchelor in 1939, from The Sporting News
- Born: September 1883; Raleigh, North Carolina, U.S.
- Died: July 1968 (aged 84); Detroit, Michigan, U.S.
- Occupation: Sportswriter
- Employer(s): The Providence Journal (1903–1906), Detroit Free Press (1906–1917), The Detroit News (1917–1919)
- Spouse: Frida Isabella (Stirling) Batchelor Hester Crawford (Wright) Batchelor
- Children: Edward Amistead Batchelor, Jr.
- Parent(s): Joseph B. Batchelor and Mary Batchelor

Edward Armistead Batchelor Sr. (September 1883 – July 1968), also known as "Batch" and "E.A.", was an American sportswriter and editor for The Providence Journal, the Detroit Free Press, and The Detroit News. He was one of the charter members of the Baseball Writers' Association of America ("BBWAA") upon its founding in October 1908 and held membership card No. 1 in that organization for many years.

== Early years ==
Batchelor was born in Raleigh, North Carolina in September 1883. His father, Joseph Branch Batchelor Jr, was an officer in the United States Army. His mother was Mary (Gouge) Batchelor (born October 1858 in Massachusetts); he had and two younger sisters, Winifred (born December 1885 in North Carolina) and Dorothy (born September 1893 in Arizona). As a result of his father's service, Batchelor lived in nine states in the first ten years of his life. He recalled that he lived for a time in Arizona while his father's regiment was assigned "to subdue an unruly group of Apaches. In the late 1890s, his father was stationed at Fort Slocum on Long Island. In April 1898, following the outbreak of the Spanish–American War, Batchelor's father was promoted to the rank of captain. His father was assigned to the Philippine Islands where he led three companies of the African-American 24th Infantry during 1899 and 1900 in combat operations against Filipino insurgents in the Pangasinan and Nueva Vizcaya provinces on Luzon. For his service and for gallantry in action, Captain Batchelor (Brevet Major) was posthumously awarded two Silver Stars.

While his father was serving in the Philippines, Batchelor graduated from New Rochelle High School in 1901 and enrolled at Brown University.

== Sportswriter in Providence ==
Batchelor worked part-time for The Providence Journal while attending Brown. His son later described Batchelor's challenge in reporting while attending college: "It meant conflict with his classes at Brown and the classes lost. At the end of a year, he terminated his formal schooling (it is understood at the request of the faculty) and threw himself into full-time newspaper work." According to another account, Batchelor's father told a fellow Army officer that he wanted his son to be a newspaperman. Batchelor's father died in the Philippines in August 1902. According to the second account, the friend in whom Batchelor's father confided returned to the United States and "rescued Eddie from an auditor's desk and found a spot for him in the sports department of the Providence Journal. Batchelor career in journalism actually began as a general reporter with The Providence Journal, covering local fires, crime, and social events. He eventually was assigned to sports stories and became the paper's sporting editor. Batchelor recalled that his assignment to sports came after the Journal's sports writer "went off the deep end," leading Batchelor to say that he credited "booze for any success I had in life."

== Sportswriter in Detroit ==
In 1906, Batchelor was hired by the Detroit Free Press at a salary of $25 per week. He began as a general reporter in Detroit before being assigned to assist the paper's sports editor, Joe S. Jackson. Batchelor became the paper's sports editor in 1910 when Jackson left Detroit to become the sporting editor of The Washington Post.

Batchelor covered the Detroit Tigers from 1907 to 1917 during the years when Ty Cobb dominated the sport. Batchelor wrote extensively about Cobb, and the two became friends. Well into his 80s, Batchelor insisted that Cobb was the greatest ball player of all time. Interviewed in 1939, Batchelor said, "There never was such a combination of brains and skill. Others might have been able to imagine the plays Cobb made, but only Cobb could execute them." When asked by The Sporting News in 1965 to pick his all-time American League All-Star team, Batchelor emphasized his view that Cobb was the greatest player of all-time: "He was the best two players I ever saw."

In 1916, Cobb became angry over a call during a game in which Batchelor was acting as the official scorer. Batchelor ruled that a line drive to the shortstop by Tris Speaker was a hit, costing Cobb percentage points in the race for the American League batting championship. Batchelor later recalled that the ball was hit so hard that it nearly turned the shortstop (Donie Bush) around, but Cobb wrote a six-page letter to Batchelor stating that "if Batchelor didn't value his friendship any more than that—to aid the opposition—then he was through talking to him." The two did not speak for two years after the incident.

One of the highlights of Batchelor's career came in 1912 when the Detroit Tigers went on strike to protest the suspension of Cobb. The team was in Philadelphia when the players went on strike, and manager Hughie Jennings spent the morning visiting Philadelphia's sandlots to recruit replacement players for a 3:00 p.m. game. Batchelor covered the game and called the replacement players "the worst bunch of clowns ever to wear major league uniforms." He opined that the only reason the replacement Tigers scored in the 24–2 defeat was because "the Athletics were laughing so hard they couldn't field."

Batchelor also befriended Babe Ruth. He covered Ruth when he was a pitcher for the Boston Red Sox. Batchelor later recalled Ruth's generosity: "Whenever the Babe would come to Detroit, he'd say, 'A little short? How about a hundred bucks? How about fifty?' You'd say, 'No thanks, Babe, I'm okay.' And he'd say, 'Well, how about a box of cigars—here y'are take a cigar.'"

Batchelor's baseball articles were also published during the 1910s in The Sporting News.

Batchelor also covered the Michigan Wolverines football team for the Free Press. After a predominantly Irish Notre Dame football team defeated Michigan, 11–3, in November 1909, Batchelor opened his report on the game with a line that gave the Notre Dame their nickname. Batchelor wrote, "Eleven fighting Irishmen wrecked the Yost machine this afternoon. These sons of Erin, individually and collectively representing the University of Notre Dame, not only beat the Michigan team, but they dashed some of Michigan's fondest hopes ..." Notre Dame football historian, John Kryk, later wrote: "With that flowery lead, E.A. Batchelor of the Detroit Free Press popularized a moniker Notre Dame teams would later come to embrace - and aptly summed up the greatest athletic achievement to that point in Notre Dame history." Kryk noted that, according to Notre Dame folklore, Batchelor had overheard a Notre Dame player trying to motivate his teammates at halftime by pleading, "What's the matter with you guys? You're all Irish and you're not fighting worth a lick."

== War correspondent in Europe ==
After the United States' entry into World War I, Batchelor was hired by The Detroit News and reported on the war from France. Batchelor later described the reason for his decision to take the job with the News: "Somehow, with a war going on, it didn't seem important if the Tigers were in first place or last." Two of Batchelor's articles from France, one reporting on soldiers' efforts to play baseball during lulls in the combat, and another about an Illinois school teacher who taught the French forces to play baseball, were published by The Sporting News. He returned from Europe in May 1919 as a passenger on the SS Noordam.

== Later years ==
After returning from Europe, Batchelor went into the advertising business. And in 1920, he formed his own advertising firm, Batchelor, Mason & Brown. He later worked for the advertising department at Chrysler Corporation. As of the 1920 United States Census, Batchelor was living at 281 Agnes Avenue in Detroit with his wife, Frida Batchelor (age 35, born in New York), their son, Edward A. Batchelor Jr. (age 4 years, 10 months, born in Michigan), and a servant, Elsie Lonsway (age 24, born in Canada).

Throughout his various advertising jobs, Batchelor was able to keep his membership in the BBWAA active by writing a monthly sports column for the Detroit Athletic Club News. In the 1930s, he also served as the publicity director for the University of Detroit football team. At the time of the 1930 United States census, Batchelor was living at 69 Moran Road in Grosse Pointe Farms, Michigan, with his wife, Frida S. Batchelor (age 45, born in New York), his son, Edward A. Batchelor Jr. (age 15, born in Michigan), and a servant, Emma Black (age 46, born in Georgia).

In 1939, The Sporting News published a lengthy feature story on Batchelor's 30 years of covering baseball in Detroit. In July 1958, the Detroit Tigers held a Hall of Fame Day at Briggs Stadium honoring the team's inductees into the Baseball Hall of Fame and also honoring Detroit's two surviving charter members of the BBWAA. Batchelor appeared in person to accept a plaque from Baseball Commissioner Ford Frick. By 1962, Batchelor was the oldest active member of the BBWAA and held membership card No. 1 with that organization. In 1965, the Tigers celebrated their 10,000th game in the American League. The team honored Batchelor on the occasion by presenting him with a television set and driving him around the field at Tiger Stadium in a 1915 Ford Model T along with Davy Jones, a member of the outfield with Ty Cobb and the first player to face Walter Johnson in a major League game.

For many years, Batchelor resided in Grosse Pointe, Michigan. In his final months, Batchelor lived in a nursing home in Detroit. Sportswriter Joe Falls remained close to Batchelor in his later years. After Batchelor died, Falls described a visit to Batchelor at the nursing home:

"Batch couldn't have weighed more than 60 pounds at the end, but his mind was nimble. He'd drift between fantasy and fact. ... But before you could feel pangs of sadness at his deterioration, he'd pull you close to the bed and whisper: 'I think it's great the Lions got Munson from the Rams. They couldn't win with Plum and Munson has the poise to be a good quarterback. Pour me a drink' Batch went out the way he would have wanted, with his lifelong friend and companion, Jack Daniels, at his side. He couldn't eat at the end, and water repulsed him, so they let him sip his favorite liquid."

Batchelor was married to Frida Isabella Stirling in 1913. Their son, E.A. Batchelor Jr., was a sportswriter in Detroit from the 1950s to the 1960s.

== Selected articles by Batchelor ==
- Fair Treatment of Deposed Player-Manager: Manager Connie Mack, of the Athletics, Believes That in Suit Cases the Player's Value Is So Impaired as to Be Sold or Traded (Connie Mack), Sporting Life, July 18, 1914, page 25
- A Mutual Contract: A Suggestion By a Detroit Lawyer Which Would Entail a Secret Understanding Instead of the Indispensable Reserve Rule, of the National Agreement, However, Sporting Life, January 23, 1915, page 11
- Major Leagues Alibi Spring Batting Slumps, Sporting Life, April 8, 1916, page 11
- Lochmoor Club's New Golf Course Close Approach to Ideal in Links, The American Golfer, September 1919
