= Johnny Wanner =

American baseball player (1885-1919)

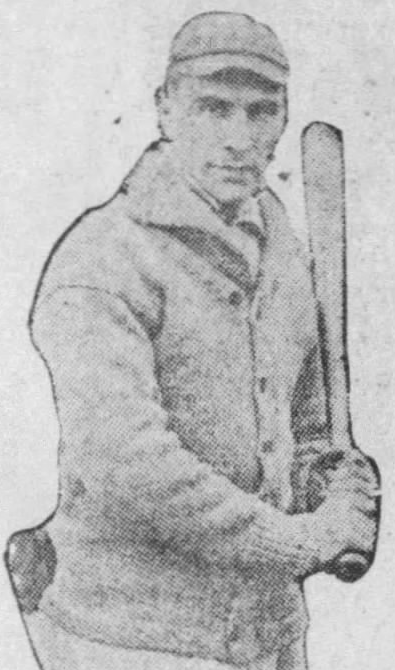
- Shortstop
- Born: Clarence Curtis Wanner; November 29, 1885; Geneseo, Illinois, U.S.
- Died: May 28, 1919 (aged 33); Geneseo, Illinois, U.S.
- Batted: Right Threw: Right

MLB debut
- September 28, 1909, for the New York Highlanders

Last MLB appearance
- October 2, 1909, for the New York Highlanders

MLB statistics
- Batting average: .125
- Home runs: 0
- RBI: 0
- Stats at Baseball Reference

Teams
- New York Highlanders (1909)

Clarence Curtis "Johnny" Wanner (November 29, 1885 – May 28, 1919) was an American Major League Baseball player who appeared in three games for the New York Highlanders in the 1909 season. He was 1 for 8 for a batting average of .125. He reached base safely three times, including one hit and two walks, and had one stolen base.

He died of tuberculosis of the spine in Geneseo, Illinois on May 28, 1919.
