= Joe Casey (catcher) =

American baseball player (1887–1966)

- Catcher
- Born: August 15, 1887; Boston, Massachusetts, U.S.
- Died: June 2, 1966 (aged 78); Melrose, Massachusetts, U.S.
- Batted: Right Threw: Right

MLB debut
- October 1, 1909, for the Detroit Tigers

Last MLB appearance
- August 24, 1918, for the Washington Senators

MLB statistics
- Batting average: .179
- Hits: 21
- Runs batted in: 7
- Stats at Baseball Reference

Teams
- Detroit Tigers (1909–1911); Washington Senators (1918)

Joseph Felix Casey (August 15, 1887 – June 2, 1966) was an American professional baseball player from 1908 to 1924. He played four seasons in Major League Baseball for the Detroit Tigers from 1909 to 1911 and the Washington Senators in 1918. He went to Boston College.

== Sources ==
- Career statistics from Baseball Reference · Baseball Reference (Minors) · Retrosheet · Baseball Almanac
