= 1908 World Series =

Major League Baseball championship games

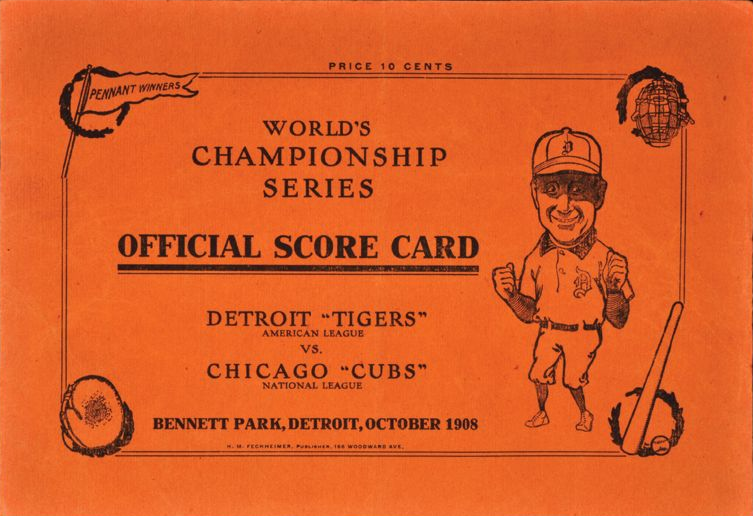
Team (Wins)	Managers	Season
Chicago Cubs (4)	Frank Chance (player/manager)	99–55, .643, GA: 1
Detroit Tigers (1)	Hughie Jennings	90–63, .588, GA: 1/2
- Dates: October 10–14
- Venue(s): Bennett Park (Detroit); West Side Grounds (Chicago)
- Umpires: Jack Sheridan (AL), Hank O'Day (NL), odd-numbered games; Bill Klem (NL), Tommy Connolly (AL), even-numbered games
- Hall of Famers: Umpires: Tommy Connolly; Bill Klem; Hank O'Day; Cubs: Mordecai Brown; Frank Chance; Johnny Evers; Joe Tinker; Tigers: Sam Crawford; Ty Cobb; Hughie Jennings (manager)

The 1908 World Series was the championship series in Major League Baseball for the 1908 season. The fifth edition of the World Series, it matched the defending National League (NL) champion Chicago Cubs against the American League (AL) champion Detroit Tigers in a rematch of the 1907 Series. In this first-ever rematch of this young event, the Cubs won in five games for their second straight World Series title.

The 1908 World Series was significant for being the last World Series championship the Cubs would win until 2016 (108 years later). That became the longest World Series championship drought for any team in North American sports history. Before the 2016 series, the team would go on to appear in seven World Series; in 1910, 1918, 1929, 1932, 1935, 1938, and 1945, losing each time. The Cubs had been one of baseball's most dominant teams in the early 1900s. This was the year of the infamous "Merkle's Boner" play that allowed the Chicago Cubs to reach the World Series after beating the New York Giants (now the San Francisco Giants) in a one-game "playoff", actually the makeup game for the tie that the Merkle play had caused.

The Series was anticlimactic after tight pennant races in both leagues. Ty Cobb had a much better World Series than in the previous year, as did the rest of his team. The final two games, held in Detroit, were shutouts. This was also the most poorly attended World Series in history, with the final game drawing a record-low 6,210 fans. Attendance in Chicago was harmed by a ticket-scalping scheme that fans accused the club's owner of participating in, and the World Series was boycotted to some degree.

For the first time, four umpires were used in the series, in alternating two-man teams. Games 1, 4, and 5 were played in Detroit, while Games 2 and 3 were played in Chicago. Had the series continued, Game 6 would have been played in Chicago, and the home team for Game 7 would have been decided randomly, "by lot".

This was also the first World Series with a defending champion and the first to feature a team that won back-to-back titles.

== Summary ==
NL Chicago Cubs (4) vs. AL Detroit Tigers (1)

Game	Date	Score	Location	Time	Attendance
1	October 10	Chicago Cubs – 10, Detroit Tigers – 6	Bennett Park	2:10	10,812
2	October 11	Detroit Tigers – 1, Chicago Cubs – 6	West Side Grounds	1:30	17,760
3	October 12	Detroit Tigers – 8, Chicago Cubs – 3	West Side Grounds	2:10	14,543
4	October 13	Chicago Cubs – 3, Detroit Tigers – 0	Bennett Park	1:35	12,907
5	October 14	Chicago Cubs – 2, Detroit Tigers – 0	Bennett Park	1:25	6,210

== Matchups ==
=== Game 1 ===
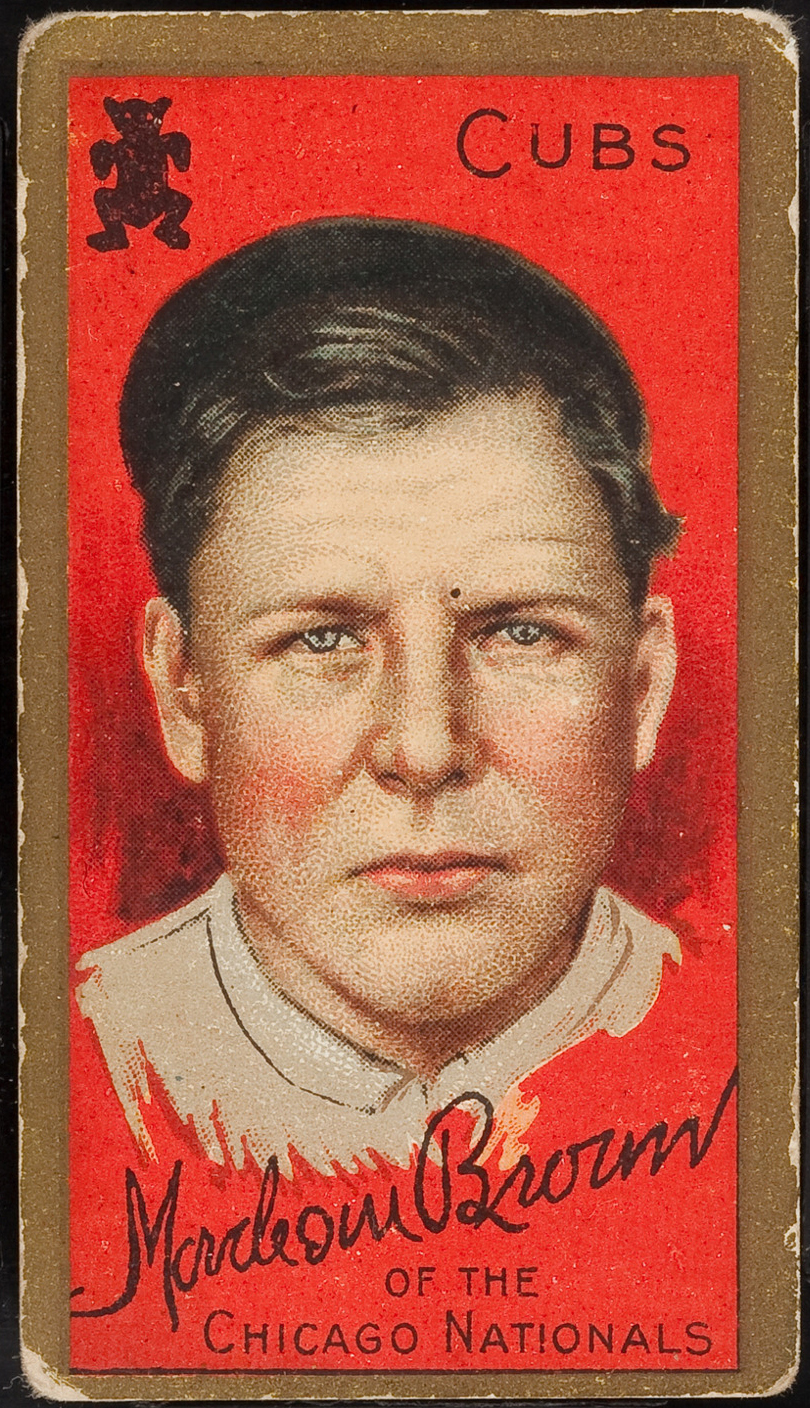
Game 1 winning pitcher Mordecai Brown

Saturday, October 10, 1908 at Bennett Park in Detroit, Michigan
Team	1	2	3	4	5	6	7	8	9	R	H	E
Chicago	0	0	4	0	0	0	1	0	5	10	14	2
Detroit	1	0	0	0	0	0	3	2	0	6	10	3
WP: Mordecai Brown (1–0) LP: Ed Summers (0–1); Attendance: 10,812; Boxscore

The Tigers struck first in Game 1 when Matty McIntyre singled to lead off the bottom of the first off of Ed Reulbach, stole second and scored on Ty Cobb's two-out single, but the Cubs responded in the third off of Ed Killian when after a leadoff double and single, Frank Schulte's RBI single tied the game. After a bunt groundout, Harry Steinfeldt's RBI single put Chicago up 2–1. After a walk, Ed Summers relieved Killian and allowed an RBI groundout to Joe Tinker and Johnny Kling reached on an error that allowed another run to score. The Cubs added another run in the seventh on Steinfedlt's sacrifice fly. In the bottom of the inning, with runners on second and third, Boss Schmidt's groundout, Red Downs's ground-rule double, and Summers's single scored a run each. Next inning, Claude Rossman's two-run single off of Mordecai Brown put the Tigers up 6–5. In the top of the ninth, three straight one-out singles loaded the bases before Solly Hofman's single scored two and Joe Tinker's bunt single scored another. After a double steal, Johnny Kling's two-run single put the Cubs up 10–6. Brown pitched a scoreless bottom of the ninth despite allowing a single and walk as the Cubs went up 1–0 in the series.

=== Game 2 ===
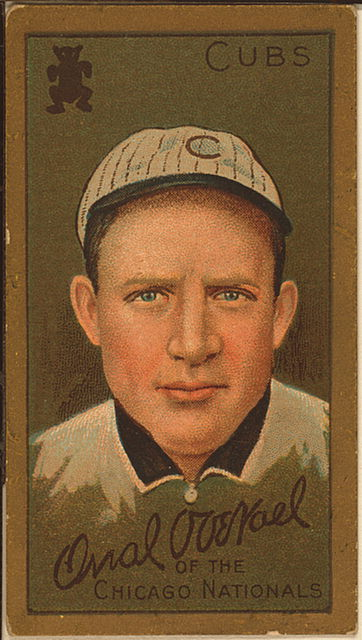
Game 2 winning pitcher Orval Overall

Sunday, October 11, 1908 at West Side Grounds in Chicago, Illinois
Team	1	2	3	4	5	6	7	8	9	R	H	E
Detroit	0	0	0	0	0	0	0	0	1	1	4	1
Chicago	0	0	0	0	0	0	0	6	X	6	7	0
WP: Orval Overall (1–0) LP: Wild Bill Donovan (0–1); Home runs: DET: None; CHC: Joe Tinker (1); Attendance: 17,760; Boxscore

A scoreless tie in the bottom of the eighth came to an end when Joe Tinker's two-run homer launched a six-run Cub outburst. Tinker's blast was the first World Series home run since Patsy Dougherty in 1903. After a ground-rule double and groundout, RBI singles by Jimmy Sheckard and Johnny Evers and an RBI triple by Frank Schulte (the last two hits coming off after stolen bases) scored a run each. A wild pitch to Frank Chance scored the Cubs' last run. The Tigers avoided a shutout in the ninth when Davy Jones drew a leadoff walk, moved to second on a groundout and scored on Ty Cobb's single. Orval Overall's complete-game win took just 90 minutes.

=== Game 3 ===
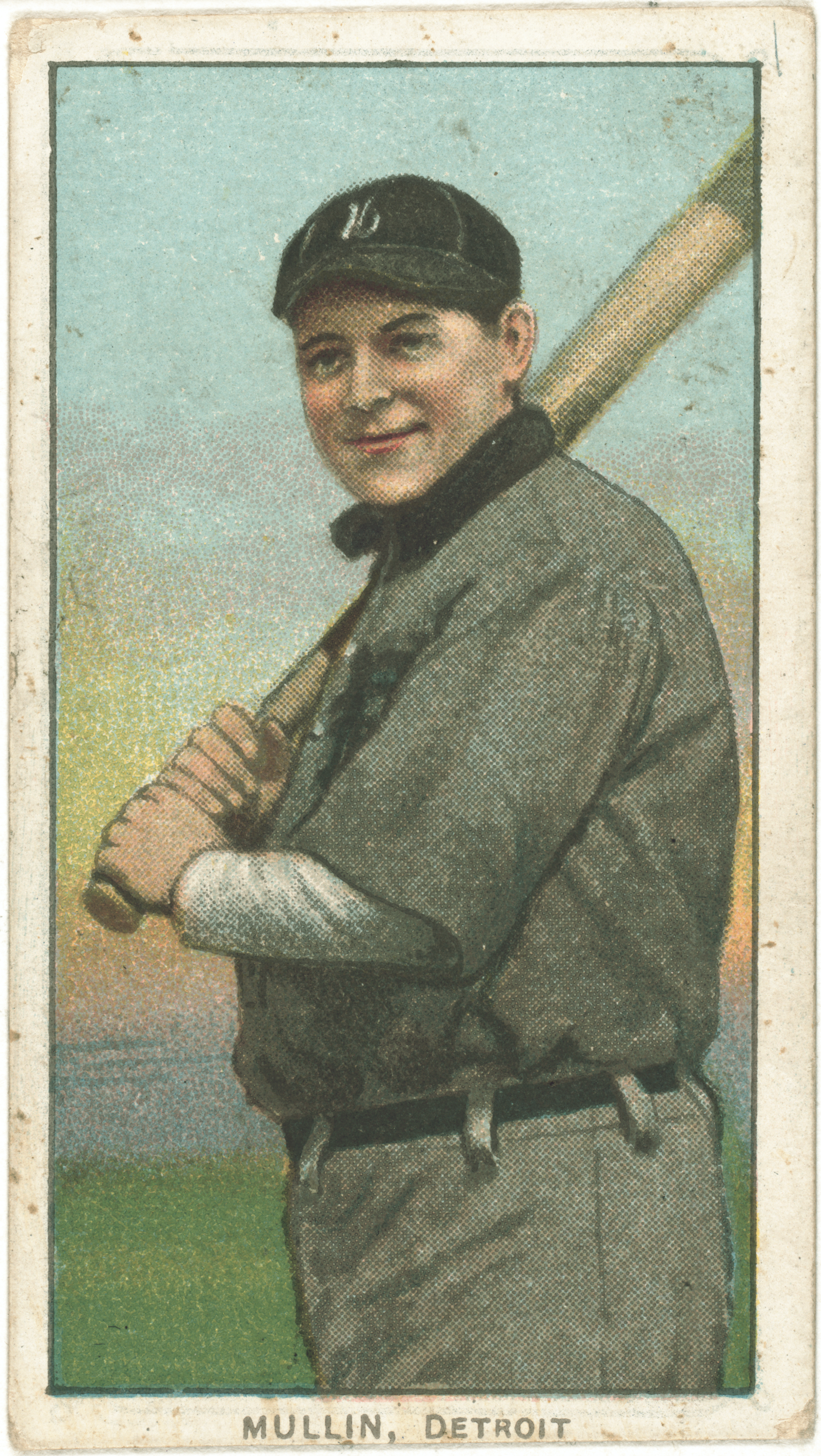
Game 3 winning pitcher George Mullin

Monday, October 12, 1908 at West Side Grounds in Chicago, Illinois
Team	1	2	3	4	5	6	7	8	9	R	H	E
Detroit	1	0	0	0	0	5	0	2	0	8	12	4
Chicago	0	0	0	3	0	0	0	0	0	3	7	0
WP: George Mullin (1–0) LP: Jack Pfiester (0–1); Attendance: 14,543; Boxscore

It was in this game that Ty Cobb enjoyed the finest World Series outing he ever had. The 21-year-old Georgian rapped three singles and a double in five at-bats, and stole two bases. In the top of the ninth, he singled and promptly stole second and third, but then the hyped-up boy wonder pressed his luck and was thrown out trying to steal home. This was the only Tiger win in their back-to-back first two World Series losses to the Cubs. Detroit struck first in the top of the first when Charley O'Leary hit a one-out single, moved to second on a groundout and scored on Ty Cobb's single. The Cubs responded in the fourth on Frank Chance's RBI single. After stealing second, an error on Harry Steinfeldt's ground ball and Solly Hofman's triple scored a run each. In the top of the sixth, after a single and walk, singles by Sam Crawford, Ty Cobb, and Claude Rossman scored a run each. After a double play, Ira Thomas's RBI double made it 6–3 Tigers. They added two more runs in the eighth on Bill Coughlin's bases loaded sacrifice fly followed by George Mullin's RBI single.

=== Game 4 ===
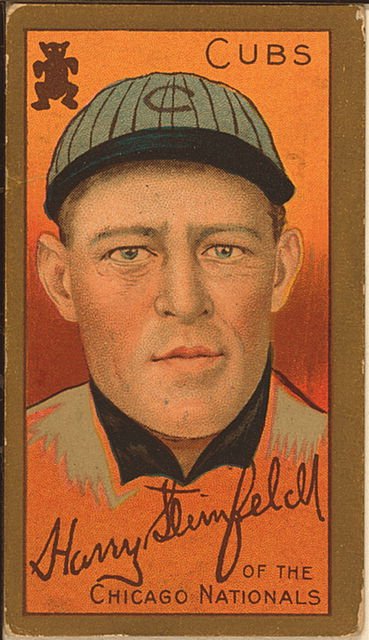
Cubs third baseman Harry Steinfeldt

Tuesday, October 13, 1908 at Bennett Park in Detroit, Michigan
Team	1	2	3	4	5	6	7	8	9	R	H	E
Chicago	0	0	2	0	0	0	0	0	1	3	10	0
Detroit	0	0	0	0	0	0	0	0	0	0	4	1
WP: Mordecai Brown (2–0) LP: Ed Summers (0–2); Attendance: 12,907; Boxscore

This one was over in 1 hour and 35 minutes. RBI singles by Harry Steinfeldt and Solly Hofman in the third inning after two walks gave Mordecai Brown all the support he'd need. Brown allowed only four hits and walked none. The Cubs added another run in the ninth when Frank Chance reached on an error with two on.

=== Game 5 ===
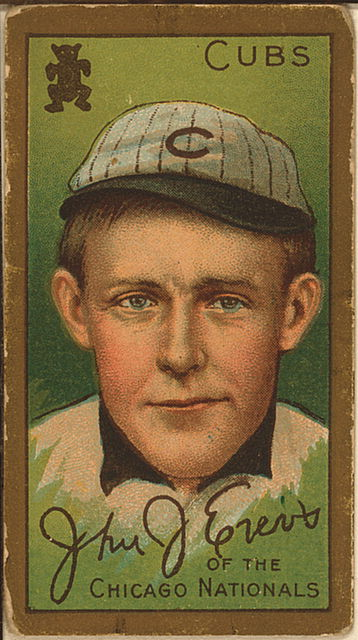
Cubs second baseman Johnny Evers

Wednesday, October 14, 1908 at Bennett Park in Detroit, Michigan
Team	1	2	3	4	5	6	7	8	9	R	H	E
Chicago	1	0	0	0	1	0	0	0	0	2	10	0
Detroit	0	0	0	0	0	0	0	0	0	0	3	0
WP: Orval Overall (2–0) LP: Wild Bill Donovan (0–2); Attendance: 6,210; Boxscore

In the first inning, Overall registered four strikeouts, as Claude Rossman reached on an uncaught third strike. This was the first, and to date only, instance of a four-strikeout inning in a World Series game. Overall allowed only three hits, walking four and striking out 10 for his second win of the series. In 18 1/3 innings pitched during the series, he allowed only seven hits and two runs for an ERA of 0.98.

The Cubs scored the game's first run in the first on three straight one-out singles, the last of which to Frank Chance scoring a run, then added another run in the fifth on Johnny Evers's double after two walks.

Boss Schmidt, who made the last out of the 1907 Series with a popup to short, also made the last out of this Series with a feeble catcher-to-first groundout.

This was also the first World Series game in which neither team committed an error. The Cubs did not win another World Series title until finally reclaiming the crown in 2016, a drought of 108 years, which remains the longest in MLB history.

The attendance during this final game of the series, 6,210, was the smallest crowd in World Series history. It also remains the fastest postseason game in major-league history, at 1 hour 25 minutes.

== Composite line score ==
1908 World Series (4–1): Chicago Cubs (N.L.) over Detroit Tigers (A.L.)

Team	1	2	3	4	5	6	7	8	9	R	H	E
Chicago Cubs	1	0	6	3	1	0	1	6	6	24	48	2
Detroit Tigers	2	0	0	0	0	5	3	4	1	15	33	9
Total attendance: 62,232 Average attendance: 12,446; Winning player's share: $1,318 Losing player's share: $870

== Aftermath ==
This was the Cubs’ last championship until 2016, 108 years later, when they finally ended their century-long championship drought over the Cleveland Indians in seven games. The Cubs would lose in their next seven World Series prior to their 2016 championship season.

This was the second straight World Series defeat for the Tigers. They would return to the Fall Classic the next year, but were defeated by the Pittsburgh Pirates in seven games.

The Tigers and Cubs would meet again in 1935 and 1945, and in those series the Tigers returned the favor, winning in six and seven games respectively.

== Sources ==
- Cohen, Richard M.; Neft, David S. (1990). The World Series: Complete Play-By-Play of Every Game, 1903–1989. New York: St. Martin's Press. pp. 23–26. ISBN 0-312-03960-3.
- Reichler, Joseph (1982). The Baseball Encyclopedia (5th ed.). Macmillan Publishing. p. 2116. ISBN 0-02-579010-2.
