= Ralph Works =

American baseball player (1888–1941)

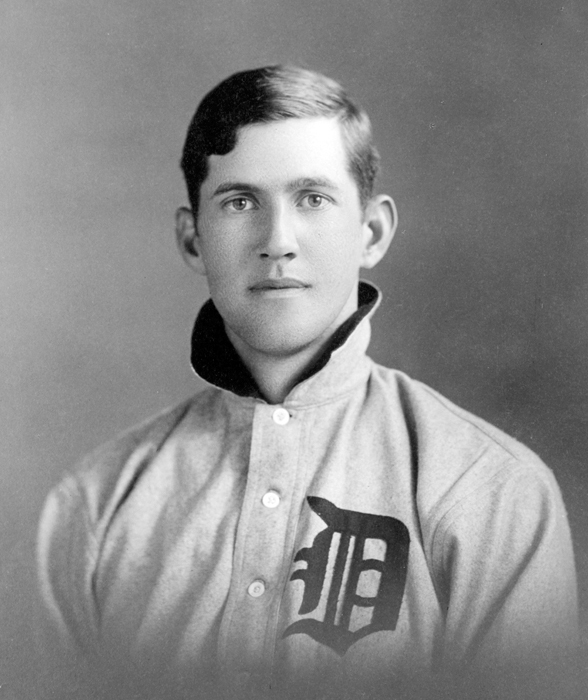
- Pitcher
- Born: March 16, 1888; Payson, Illinois, U.S.
- Died: August 8, 1941 (aged 53); Pasadena, California, U.S.
- Batted: Left Threw: Right

MLB debut
- May 1, 1909, for the Detroit Tigers

Last MLB appearance
- April 28, 1913, for the Cincinnati Reds

MLB statistics
- Win–loss record: 24–24
- Earned run average: 3.79
- Strikeouts: 208
- Stats at Baseball Reference

Teams
- Detroit Tigers (1909–1912); Cincinnati Reds (1912–1913)

Ralph Talmadge Works (March 16, 1888 – August 8, 1941), nicknamed "Judge," was an American professional baseball pitcher. He played all or part of five seasons in Major League Baseball with the Detroit Tigers (1909–12) and Cincinnati Reds (1912–13).

Works was born in 1888 in Payson, Illinois.

He began playing professional baseball in 1907 for the Medicine Hat Hatters in the Western Canada League, compiling a career-high 26 games and 11 losses for a .703 winning percentage. In 1908, he played for the Syracuse Stars in the New York State League.

In 1909, Works made his major league debut with the Detroit Tigers. He appeared in 15 games, four as a starter, and compiled a 4-1 record with a career-low 1.97 earned run average (ERA). After a poor showing in 1910 with a 3-6 record, he compiled an 11-5 record in 1911 with a 3.87 ERA. He played a total of four seasons with Detroit, compiling a 23-22 record and a 3.68 ERA. He also appeared in vaudeville during the off-seasons.

In September 1912, the Tigers sold Works to Providence in the International League. He was then drafted by the Cincinnati Reds in the 1912 Rule 5 draft. He appeared in three games for the Reds at the end of the 1912 season and another five games in 1913.

He split the 1914 season between the St. Paul Apostles and Memphis Chickasaws. He then concluded his professional baseball career in 1916 with the Mobile Sea Gulls.

In 1941, at age 53, Works and his wife died from gunshot wounds at their home in Pasadena, California. Works was found with a .44 caliber revolver in his hand, and the deaths were reported as a murder-suicide. He was buried at Mountain View Cemetery in Altadena, California.

== See also ==
- List of homicides in California
