= Tom Jones (baseball) =

American baseball player (1874–1923)

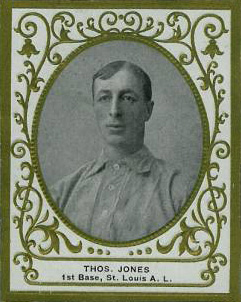
- First baseman
- Born: June 21, 1874; Honesdale, Pennsylvania
- Died: June 19, 1923 (aged 48); Danville, Pennsylvania
- Batted: Right Threw: Right

MLB debut
- August 25, 1902, for the Baltimore Orioles

Last MLB appearance
- October 9, 1910, for the Detroit Tigers

MLB statistics
- Batting average: .251
- Home runs: 4
- Runs batted in: 336
- Stats at Baseball Reference

Teams
- Baltimore Orioles (1902); St. Louis Browns (1904–1909); Detroit Tigers (1909–1910)

Thomas Jones (June 21, 1874 – June 19, 1923) was an American baseball player. He played professional baseball, principally as a first baseman, from 1902 to 1915, including eight years in Major League Baseball with the Baltimore Orioles (1902), St. Louis Browns (1904–1909), and Detroit Tigers (1909–1910). He compiled a .251 career batting average in 813 major league games.

He was one of the best defensive first basemen of his era. He led all American League players, regardless of position, with 487 outs made in 1904 and 1,616 putouts in 1908. Among the league's first basemen, he ranked second in assists for six consecutive years from 1904 to 1909, led in range factor in 1904 (11.46) and 1905 (11.90), and also led with 79 double plays in 1908. His career range factor of 11.20 ranks third all-time in major league history.

== Early years ==
Jones was born in Honesdale, Pennsylvania, in 1874.

== Professional baseball ==
Jones made his major league debut on August 25, 1902, with the Baltimore Orioles. He appeared in 37 games for the Orioles and compiled a .283 batting average. After the 1902 season, the Orioles moved to New York and became the Yankees. Jones remained in Baltimore with the newly formed Baltimore Orioles minor league club of 1903. Jones appeared in 127 games at first and second base and compiled a .335 batting average with 103 RBIs and 17 stolen bases.

In September 1903, Jones was drafted by the St. Louis Browns. He played six seasons for the Browns from 1904 to 1909 and became known as one of the best defensive first basemen in baseball. He led all American League players, regardless of position, with 487 outs made in 1904 and 1,616 putouts in 1908. He ranked second in putouts in 1904, 1905, 1907, and 1910. Among the league's first basemen, he ranked second in assists for six consecutive years from 1904 to 1909, led in range factor in 1904 (11.46) and 1905 (11.90), and also led with 79 double plays in 1908. His career range factor of 11.20 ranks third all-time in major league history behind Jiggs Donahue and Frank Isbell. He also led the American League with 40 sacrifice hits in 1906.

On August 20, 1909, the Browns traded Jones to the Detroit Tigers in exchange for Claude Rossman. He appeared in 44 games for the 1909 Tigers and also appeared in all seven games of the 1909 World Series against the Pittsburgh Pirates. In 1910, Jones concluded his major league career with the Tigers, compiling a .255 batting average in 135 games.

Over the course of eight major league seasons, Jones appeared in 1,058 games, 1,033 of them as a first baseman, and compiled a .258 batting average with 964 hits and 135 stolen bases. Defensively, he totaled 10,872 putouts, 698 assists, 456 double plays, and 183 errors.

After his major league career ended, Jones played for five seasons with the Milwaukee Brewers of the American Association from 1911 to 1915.

== Later years ==
Jones died in Danville, Pennsylvania, in 1923 at age 48.
