= Chuck Rose =

American baseball player (1885–1961)

- Pitcher
- Born: September 1, 1885; Macon, Missouri, U.S.
- Died: August 4, 1961 (aged 75); Salina, Kansas, U.S.
- Batted: Left Threw: Left

MLB debut
- September 13, 1909, for the St. Louis Browns

Last MLB appearance
- September 29, 1909, for the St. Louis Browns

MLB statistics
- Win–loss record: 1-2
- Earned run average: 5.40
- Strikeouts: 6
- Stats at Baseball Reference

Teams
- St. Louis Browns (1909)

Charles Alfred Rose (September 1, 1885 – August 4, 1961) was an American professional baseball pitcher, outfielder, and first baseman. He played three games in Major League Baseball for St. Louis Browns. Rose was 5 feet, 8 inches tall and weighed 158 pounds.

== Career ==
Rose was born in Macon, Missouri, in 1885. He started his professional baseball career in 1902 with Fargo of the Northern League. Rose stayed with Fargo for five seasons, playing mostly in the outfield. He had batting averages above .270 during each campaign and twice batted over .300.

In 1907, Rose joined the Burlington Pathfinders. The following season, he played for three teams: the Central Association's Pathfinders, the Texas League's Austin Senators, and the Pacific Coast League's Portland Beavers. With Burlington, Rose was a first baseman and batted .302 with a league-leading 146 hits. With the other two teams, he was a pitcher and had a combined win–loss record of 8-19.

Rose spent most of the 1909 season with the Texas League's Houston Buffaloes. His contract was purchased by the American League's St. Louis Browns in July, but he pitched for the Buffaloes until September, going 21-16, before joining the Browns. In three MLB starts that season, Rose went 1-2 with a 5.40 earned run average. That was the only time he would appear in the majors.

The following year, Rose returned to the Houston Buffaloes. He played for them from 1910 to 1915 and won over 20 games three times in those six years. In 1913, he went 26-7 and led the Texas League in wins. He retired with a career record of 143-99 in the minor leagues.

Rose died in Salina, Kansas, in 1961.
