= Walt Devoy =

American multi-sport athlete and executive

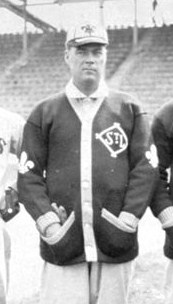
- Right fielder
- Born: March 14, 1885; St. Louis, Missouri, U.S.
- Died: December 17, 1953 (aged 68); St. Louis, Missouri, U.S.
- Batted: Right Threw: Right

MLB debut
- September 13, 1909, for the St. Louis Browns

Last MLB appearance
- October 3, 1909, for the St. Louis Browns

MLB statistics
- Batting average: .246
- Home runs: 0
- Runs batted in: 8
- Stats at Baseball Reference

Teams
- St. Louis Browns (1909)

Walter Joseph Devoy (March 14, 1885 – December 17, 1953) was an American multi-sport athlete and executive. He was Major League Baseball right fielder who played in 1909 with the St. Louis Browns.

In addition to his baseball career, Devoy played in the St. Louis Soccer League. In 1923, he was an executive with the Ben Millers.
