= Joe S. Jackson =

American sportswriter and editor

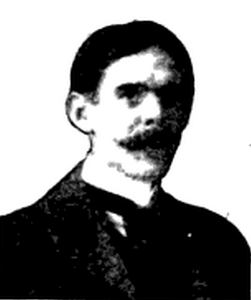
- Jackson from 1907 Spalding Guide
- Born: Joseph Samuel Jackson; July 1871; Providence, Rhode Island, U.S.
- Died: May 19, 1936; San Francisco, California, U.S.
- Occupation: Sportswriter
- Known for: President, Baseball Writers' Association of America, 1908–1919

Joseph S. Jackson (July 1871 – May 19, 1936) was an American sportswriter and editor for the Detroit Free Press, The Washington Post and The Detroit News. He was the founder and first president of the Baseball Writers' Association of America, holding the office from 1908 to 1919.

== Early years ==
Jackson was born in Providence, Rhode Island, in 1871. At the time of the 1900 United States census, he was living in Providence and working as a reporter. He worked for six years for the Providence Telegram from 1895 to 1901 and became the newspaper's Sunday and sporting editor.

== Sportswriter ==
In November 1901, Jackson was hired to replace Ray M. Ziegler as the sporting editor of the Detroit Free Press, a position he held until 1910. In addition to his editorial duties, Jackson published a regular column titled "Sporting Facts and Fancies", and feature stories on the major sports events in the city. He covered Michigan Wolverines football in the era of Fielding H. Yost's "Point-a-Minute" teams and the Detroit Tigers during the early years of Ty Cobb's career in Major League Baseball. Jackson is credited with having given Cobb the nickname, "The Georgia Peach". In 1910, he became the sports editor of The Washington Post. He published a regular column in The Washington Post called Sporting Facts and Fancies. After three years in Washington, D.C., Jackson returned to Detroit as a sports writer and editor for The Detroit News-Tribune. He subsequently returned to the Detroit Free Press.

== Baseball Writers' Association of America ==
In 1908, Jackson and Jack Ryder of the Cincinnati Enquirer organized the Baseball Writers' Association of America (BBWAA). The BBWAA was established in response to ongoing disputes over working conditions in, and control over, press boxes. The press boxes at many fields were cramped, and team owners had begun to offer seating in the press boxes to actors, friends and others who were not members of the working press. Frequently, there was no room for reporters from the visiting team. The issue came to a head during the 1908 World Series between the Detroit Tigers and Chicago Cubs when visiting baseball writers in Chicago were seated in the back row of the grandstand and in Detroit "were compelled to climb a ladder to the roof of the first base pavilion and write in the rain and snow".

The organization was established at a meeting held at the Pontchartrain Hotel in Detroit, Michigan, on October 14, 1908, following the 1908 World Series. Jackson was selected as the organization's first president and held that position for 11 years from 1908 to 1919. When Jackson stepped down as president in October 1919, the Association presented him with "a handsome traveling bag".

== Later years and death ==
In 1921, Jackson moved to California and worked for several years there. He died in San Francisco, California, in June 1936. Edgar Guest, known as the "People's Poet", began his writing career with the Detroit Free Press in the early 1900s. After learning of Jackson's death, Guest published a poem titled "Joe S. Jackson" which provided in part:

"Joe wrote of baseball in the years gone by
And all the sports which men and boys enjoyed.
His was the nimble brain, the watchful eye,
Mine was the poor assistance he employed
* * *
Word comes that Joe is dead. The game goes on!
Before the march of time all champions fall.
Now those he lavished praise and help upon
Only the dusty record books recall.

== Selected articles by Jackson ==
- Baseball's Tangled Tale, Pugilism's Bright Vista, Detroit Free Press, December 15, 1901
- Michigan 12, Wisconsin 0 -- Only Chicago To Brush Aside Now, Detroit Free Press, November 19, 1905
- An Optimistic View Hugh Jennings Takes of His Work for '07 (Hughie Jennings/1907 Detroit Tigers), Detroit Free Press, September 23, 1906
- White Sox Conquerors (1906 World Series), October 15, 1906
- Darkness Stops Opening Contest (1907 World Series), Detroit Free Press, October 9, 1907
- Opportune Hits Give Victory To Cubs (1907 World Series), Detroit Free Press, October 10, 1907
- Hope for Tiges Gets Severe Setback (1907 World Series), Detroit Free Press, October 12, 1907
- Cobb All But Loses Crown (1907 AL batting crown), Detroit Free Press, November 19, 1907
- Awful Ninth Beats Tiges (1908 World Series), Detroit Free Press, October 11, 1908
- Tigers' Farewell Dinner Proves a Grand Success (1908 World Series), Detroit Free Press, October 18, 1908
- Michigan's Worst Defeat of the Yost Regime, Detroit Free Press, November 15, 1908
- Game Is Peculiar Medley of Hitting, Erratic Play and Reckless Base Running--Tiges Go at Top Speed Until They Catch Sox, Then Make It an Easy Finish, Detroit Free Press, October 3, 1909
- Tiges Lose the First, But Still Look Good (1909 World Series), Detroit Free Press, October 9, 1909
- Playing at Their Proper Gait, Tigers Take Second Game, 7 to 2 (1909 World Series), Detroit Free Press, October 10, 1909
- Tiges Make It Even in a Nerve-Racking Fight with Pirates (1909 World Series), Detroit Free Press, October 15, 1909
- Game Today Decides Ownership of Title (1909 World Series), October 16, 1909
- Tigers Loss Saw-Off Game in Big Series (1909 World Series), Detroit Free Press, October 17, 1909
- Home Grown Cuban Ball Players Are Real Money Kings (Baseball in Cuba), Detroit Free Press, November 21, 1909
- First Time at Bat for Schmidt Gives Detroit a Victory: Sent Up With Bases Filled and Two Down, Coal Hill Boy Hits Two Home and Cinches It for His Team (Boss Schmidt), Detroit Free Press, May 6, 1910
- New Outlaw: Washington Reports Such a League Move; A Proposition to Revive Lawson's Union League Scheme With a Purely Eastern Circuit, Including Some Major League Cities, Sporting Life, December 1911, page 12
- The Claims of the Lawyer-Leader of the Base Ball Players' Fraternity Riddled By a Scribe's Recital of the Cold Facts (Dave Fultz), Sporting Life, November 16, 1912, page 10
- The Spurt of the Tigers Due Wholly to Great Batting -- Young Pitchers Who Look Good -- Infield Again Broken Up (Detroit's "wrecking crew" outfield of Veach, Cobb, Crawford), Sporting Life, May 1, 1915, page 7
- Detroit Dash for the Pennant (1916 Detroit Tigers season), Sporting Life, September 23, 1916, page 6
- President Navin Preparing for Real War -- Hold-Out Players Will Have Further Reduction in Salary to Face -- List of Players Signed Sporting Life, February 10, 1917, page 7
- Turner to Quit Grand Old Game, With His Record Just as Grand (Terry Turner), Detroit Free Press, August 27, 1918
- Jimmie Burke Finds Dying Year One to Recall With No Regrets (Jimmy Burke), Detroit Free Press, August 28, 1918
- With Vitt, Young, Burns, Bush: Infield in a Winter League Tale (Ossie Vitt/Donie Bush), Detroit Free Press, September 18, 1918
- Sob Story is Wasted On Ellison; Still On Ocean's Quieter Shore (Babe Ellison), Detroit Free Press, September 20, 1918
- House Cleaning of National Game Begins With Trial in Chase Case (Hal Chase), Detroit Free Press, September 21, 1918
- Can a Star Ball Player Come Back After Year Out? Cobb, Away Now After Best Season, May Answer, Detroit Free Press, September 22, 1918
- Vitt Breaks Into Shipyards Ball; League at Coast is a Major Now (Ossie Vitt), Detroit Free Press, October 1, 1918
- Into the Future A Cleric Peers; Vista, Sad to Him, Cheer to Sport, Detroit Free Press, October 3, 1918
- Service Flag of One Detroit Team Shows 14 Stars, One of Them Gold (Detroit Heralds), Detroit Free Press, October 4, 1918
- Hughie's War Work Over the Seas May Mean End of Baseball Career (Hughie Jennings), Detroit Free Press, October 5, 1918
- Overlooked Because of General Strength of Nine, Bush and Veach Have Credit Due Not Often Given for Their Share in Wonderful Attack on Bengals (Donie Bush/Bobby Veach), October 6, 1918
- STANAGE CAN MAKE FOUR BOASTS SHOULD HE QUIT NOW TWO LEAGUE MARKS ARE SAFE IN MITT OF OSCAR VITT (Oscar Stanage), Detroit Free Press, October 13, 1918
- JESS' LAZING HURTING GATE OF BIG FIGHT (Jess Willard vs. Jack Dempsey fight in Toledo), Detroit Free Press, June 25, 1919
- SIGNS OF LIFE BEING SHOWN IN FIGHT CITY (Willard/Demsey), Detroit Free Press, June 29, 1919
- TOLEDO FIGHT SETS RECORD FOR FREAKS (Willard/Dempsey), Detroit Free Press, July 1, 1919
- ALL TOLEDO HOT ON TRAIL OF ALIEN COIN (Willard/Dempsey), Detroit Free Press, July 2, 1919
- SIDELIGHTS OF THE CONTEST ON SHORES OF MAUMEE BAY (Willard/Dempsey), Detroit Free Press, July 5, 1919
- Tyrus Cobb, Through Thirteen Point Gain Past Week, Again Leads the Batters; Champion Slugger Is Closely Followed by Sisler and Veach -- Detroit Has Four Hitters in the 300 Class Now (Ty Cobb), Detroit Free Press, August 10, 1919
- Sidelights on Game (1919 World Series), October 6, 1919
