= Dick Carroll (baseball) =

American baseball player (1884-1945)

- Pitcher
- Born: July 21, 1884; Cleveland, Ohio, U.S.
- Died: November 22, 1945 (aged 61); Cleveland, Ohio, U.S.
- Batted: Right Threw: Right

MLB debut
- September 25, 1909, for the New York Highlanders

Last MLB appearance
- September 25, 1909, for the New York Highlanders

MLB statistics
- Win–loss record: 0–0
- Earned run average: 3.60
- Strikeouts: 1
- Stats at Baseball Reference

Teams
- New York Highlanders (1909)

Richard Thomas Carroll (July 21, 1884 – November 22, 1945), nicknamed "Shawdow", was an American Major League Baseball pitcher. Carroll played for the New York Highlanders in 1909. In 2 career games, he had a 0–0 record with a 3.60 ERA. He batted and threw right-handed.

After retiring from baseball in 1920, Carroll worked as a dealer of automobile trailers in his native Cleveland, Ohio and from 1930 on, in the oil industry in New York. He suffered a heart attack while visiting relatives in Cleveland on November 22, 1945.
