= Claude Rossman =

American baseball player (1881–1928)

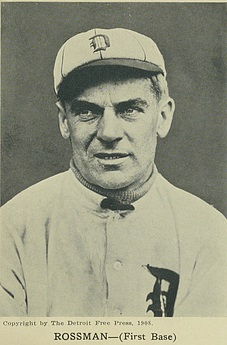
- Rossman in 1908
- First baseman
- Born: June 17, 1881; Philmont, New York, U.S.
- Died: January 16, 1928 (aged 46); Poughkeepsie, New York, U.S.
- Batted: Left Threw: Left

MLB debut
- September 16, 1904, for the Cleveland Naps

Last MLB appearance
- September 3, 1909, for the St. Louis Browns

MLB statistics
- Batting average: .283
- Home runs: 3
- Runs batted in: 238
- Stats at Baseball Reference

Teams
- Cleveland Naps (1904, 1906); Detroit Tigers (1907–1909); St. Louis Browns (1909)

Claude R. Rossman (June 17, 1881 – January 16, 1928) was an American professional baseball player. He played for 12 years from 1903 to 1914, principally as first baseman, including five years in Major League Baseball with the Cleveland Naps (1904, 1906), Detroit Tigers (1907–1909) and St. Louis Browns (1909). He appeared in 511 major league games and compiled a .283 batting average and a .318 on-base percentage.

== Early years ==
Rossman was born in Philmont, New York, in 1881.

== Professional baseball ==
Rossman began playing professional baseball in 1903 in the Connecticut League and was with Holyoke in 1903 and 1904. He was drafted by the Cleveland Naps but was sent to the Naps' minor league team in Des Moines in 1905. Rossman finally made it to the major leagues in September 1904, playing 16 games in right field for the Naps in the closing weeks of the season.

Rossman did not play in the majors in 1905 but won a spot as the Naps' starting first baseman in 1906. He hit .308 in 118 games with 53 RBIs. Rossman's .308 average in 1906 was 8th best in the American League and third highest among the Cleveland regulars—trailing two Hall of Famers, Nap Lajoie and Elmer Flick.

In December 1906, the Naps sold Rossman to the Detroit Tigers. With Ty Cobb and Sam Crawford already in the Detroit lineup, the addition of manager Hughie Jennings and Rossman in 1907 gave the Tigers the spark they needed to win three straight American League pennants from 1907 to 1909.

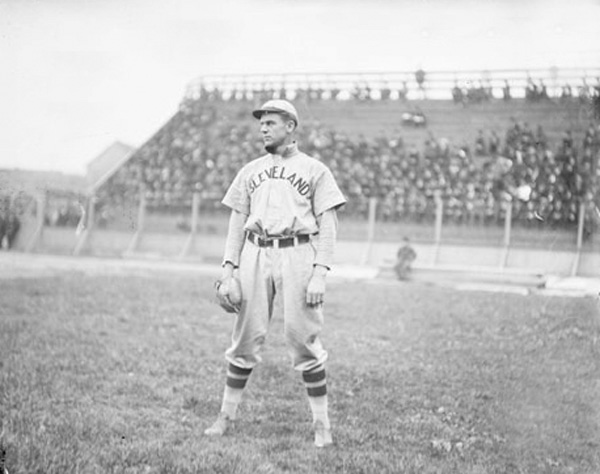
Claude Rossman, Cleveland Indians

Rossman had a good season for the Tigers in 1907, playing 153 games at first base. He was among the 1907 American League leaders in RBIs (69), hits (158), total bases (195) and runs created (62). Rossman also excelled in the 1907 World Series, batting .474 with a .579 slugging percentage, 9 hits, 2 RBIs and a run. Unfortunately for the Tigers, their two biggest hitting stars, Ty Cobb and Sam Crawford, did not come through, hitting .200 and .238 respectively. Rossman had as many hits and triples in the 1907 World Series as Cobb and Crawford combined.

In 1908, Rossman had the best year of his career. Rossman was among the American League leaders in most batting categories: 2nd in doubles with 33 (trailing only Ty Cobb); 3rd in total bases with 219 and extra base hits with 48 (trailing teammates Cobb and Crawford in both categories); 4th in slugging percentage at .418; 5th in RBIs (71), triples (13), and OPS (.748); and 6th in batting average at .294. In the 1908 World Series, Rossman had two hits and 3 RBIs in another losing effort to the Chicago Cubs.

Batting behind Ty Cobb in the Detroit lineup, Rossman had a useful talent for laying down bunts. Rossman was so proficient at bunting that Cobb was regularly able to streak from first to third base on Rossman's bunts.

On August 20, 1909, with Rossman batting .261 in his third season in Detroit, the Tigers traded him to the St. Louis Browns for Tom Jones. Rossman played in only 2 games for the Browns, his last major league game occurring on September 3, 1909.

Rossman continued to play professionally in the American Association after leaving the Browns. First with Columbus in 1910 and later that season with Minneapolis, where he continued to play until 1914.

Rossman had a peculiar emotional quirk where he sometimes froze and could not throw the ball when he became excited. Runners would lead off first to draw a throw from the pitcher, then run to second when Rossman froze. Rossman had excellent range as a first baseman. His career Range factor of 11.06 at first base was almost 2.00 full points above the average for first baseman of his era. But his propensity to freeze with the ball in his throwing hand is said to have greatly shortened his career. He was 28 when he played his last major league game.

In 511 major league games, Rossman hit .283 with 523 hits, 238 RBI, 175 runs, 109 extra base hits, and 49 stolen bases.

== Later years ==
In December 1922, Rossman was living in Minneapolis when he was psychiatrically hospitalized. A patrolman found him on the street "muttering to himself and acting queerly." Financial troubles were thought to be a cause of his condition; it was reported that he had $20,000 saved when he last played professional baseball seven years earlier but was down to less than $100 at the time of his breakdown. In 1924, Rossman began residing at Hudson River State Hospital in Poughkeepsie, New York after being transferred from a hospital in Albany. He had returned to New York some time earlier before his "nervous condition" worsened. Rossman died at age 46 at the Hudson River State Hospital. He is buried in an unmarked grave within the Rossman family plot in the Mellenville Union Cemetery, just outside the village of Philmont.
