= List of Northern Illinois University people =

The list of Northern Illinois University people includes notable alumni, non-graduates, faculty and staff, chief executives, and affiliates of the Northern Illinois University.

== Presidents of Northern Illinois University ==
The following persons have led Northern Illinois University as president since 1899:

| No. | Image | President | Term start | Term end | Refs. |
|---|---|---|---|---|---|
| 1 | | John Williston Cook | 1899 | 1919 | |
| 2 | | J. Stanley Brown | 1919 | 1927 | |
| 3 | | Joseph Clifton Brown | 1927 | 1929 | |
| 4 | | Karl Langdon Adams | 1929 | September 5, 1948 (Note: died in office) | |
| 5 | | Leslie A. Holmes | 1949 | 1967 | |
| 6 | | Rhoten A. Smith | 1967 | 1971 | |
| 7 | | Richard J. Nelson | August 1, 1971 | January 27, 1978 | |
| 8 | | William R. Monat | 1978 | 1984 | |
| 9 | | Clyde Wingfield | July 1, 1985 | May 22, 1986 | |
| 10 | | John E. La Tourette | May 22, 1986 | May 31, 2000 | |
| 11 | | John G. Peters | June 1, 2000 | June 30, 2013 | |
| 12 | | Douglas D. Baker | July 1, 2013 | June 30, 2017 | |
| interim | | Lisa C. Freeman | July 1, 2017 | September 20, 2018 | |
| 13 | | Lisa C. Freeman | September 20, 2018 | present | |

Table notes:

== Notable alumni ==
=== Academe ===
- Ross Alexander (Ph.D. 2002), 5th president of Texas A&M University-Texarkana
- Jerry M. Anderson (M.S. 1959), 9th president of Ball State University
- Gregg Andrews (Ph.D. 1988), labor historian and Distinguished Professor Emeritus at Texas State University
- Judith Curry (B.S. 1974, Ph.D. 1982), climatologist
- Jose Manuel "Chel" Diokno (J.D. 1986), founding dean of the De La Salle University College of Law in Malate, Manila, Philippines
- John Dunn (B.A. 1967, M.A. 1969), president of Western Michigan University
- Kevin Folta, professor and chairman of the horticultural science department at the University of Florida
- Michael Honey, Guggenheim Fellow and Haley Professor of Humanities at the University of Washington Tacoma
- Louise Huffman (M.S. 1979), teacher and educator on US Antarctic programs
- Thomas Lindsay (B.A. 1977, M.A. 1983), president of Shimer College
- Timothy P. Marshall (B.S. 1978), meteorologist and civil engineer, damage analysis expert
- Robert J. Mislevy (B.S 1972, M.S. 1974), academic and psychometrician
- Professor Thomas J. Near (B.A., B.S., 1993; M.S. 1995), evolutionary biologist, professor of Ecology and Evolutionary Biology, 18th head of Saybrook College at Yale University
- Vice Admiral Ann Rondeau USN, Retired (Ed.D.), past president of College of DuPage, past president of National Defense University
- Gregg Schlanger (MFA 1989), professor of Art and chair of the Department of Art at Central Washington University
- Dr. Christopher J. Schneider (M.A. 2004), professor at Wilfrid Laurier University
- Paul Sereno, paleontologist, University of Chicago, B.S., Biology, 1979
- Bharath Sriraman, academic editor, professor of mathematics at The University of Montana (M.S. 1999, Ph.D. 2002)

=== Arts and entertainment ===
- Joan Allen, 1980, actress, Academy Award nominee and Tony Award winner, The Contender, The Bourne Supremacy, Nixon, Face/Off, The Upside of Anger
- Dan Castellaneta, 1979, Emmy Award-winning actor, voice of "Homer Simpson" and others on The Simpsons
- Mike Disa, film director, screenwriter, animator (Pocahontas, Hercules, Tarzan and Atlantis: The Lost Empire)
- Charlotte Kate Fox, actress and first non-Japanese heroine of an NHK Asadora: the series Massan broadcast on Japanese television; earned her Master of Fine Arts at NIU
- Brian Godawa, screenwriter and author
- Steve Harris, 1989, actor, Emmy Award nominee, The Practice
- Wood Harris, actor, Remember the Titans and The Wire
- E. E. Knight, 1987, author of Vampire Earth series, Age of Fire series
- Sebastian Maniscalco, stand-up comedian (The Late Late Show, Comedians in Cars Getting Coffee)
- Justin Mentell, 2005, actor, Boston Legal
- Joe Minoso, actor, Boss and Chicago Fire
- Nicole Mitchell, musician and composer
- Cindy Morgan, actress, Lacy Underall in Caddyshack, Lora and Yori in TRON
- Matthew Prozialeck, blues musician, harmonica player
- Brian Simpson, smooth jazz pianist and composer
- Jason Matthew Smith, actor who portrays Ensign Hendorff in Star Trek, Star Trek Into Darkness and Star Trek Beyond
- Carrie Snodgress, Oscar-nominated actress (Diary of a Mad Housewife, Pale Rider, The Forsaken, Phantom 2040)
- Peter Sotos, writer, musician, and child pornography publisher, best known as a member of the band Whitehouse
- Kurt Sutter, actor, writer, producer, Sons of Anarchy and The Shield
- Doug Walker, YouTube personality known for web show Nostalgia Critic
- Matt Walsh, comedian and actor (Old School, Role Models, The Hangover); portrays Mike McLintock on Veep
- Patricia Wood, author of Lottery; attended NIU
- Barbara Alyn Woods, actress, One Tree Hill
- Robert Zemeckis, director, Back to the Future, Who Framed Roger Rabbit and Forrest Gump; attended NIU before enrolling in film study at University of Southern California

=== Media ===
- Nicole Briscoe, anchor for ESPN's SportsCenter
- T.J. Simers, former Los Angeles Times sportswriter
- Dalton Tanonaka, journalist and television executive, earned B.Sc. in journalism at NIU in 1977

=== Business ===
- Jeff Aronin, founder of Ovation Pharmaceuticals
- Allan Cox, author and business leader
- Ralph de la Vega, CEO of AT&T Mobility
- John Sall, co-founder of the SAS Institute and member of the Forbes 400

=== Athletics ===
==== American football ====
- Chad Beebe, wide receiver for Minnesota Vikings
- Ken Bishop, defensive tackle for Dallas Cowboys
- Christian Blake, wide receiver for Atlanta Falcons
- George Bork, quarterback for NIU 1962-63, first NCAA player to pass for more than 3,000 yards, College Football Hall of Fame
- Joel Bouagnon, running back for Chicago Bears and Green Bay Packers
- Larry Brink, NFL defensive lineman, two-time Pro Bowler
- Da'Ron Brown, wide receiver for Kansas City Chiefs
- Brad Cieslak, NFL tight end for Buffalo Bills and Cleveland Browns
- Ryan Diem, NFL offensive tackle for Indianapolis Colts
- Larry English, NFL defensive end/linebacker for San Diego Chargers and Tampa Bay Buccaneers; #16 pick in NFL Draft, highest ever by a NIU player
- P. J. Fleck, head football coach at the University of Minnesota, former NFL wide receiver for San Francisco 49ers
- Doug Free, NFL offensive tackle for Dallas Cowboys
- Kenny Golladay, wide receiver for New York Giants
- Thomas Hammock, head football coach at NIU; former assistant coach for Baltimore Ravens (NFL) and Wisconsin Badgers
- Chandler Harnish, NFL quarterback for Indianapolis Colts, MVP of 2010 Humanitarian Bowl victory
- Duane Hawthorne, NFL cornerback for Dallas Cowboys
- Jack Heflin, defensive end for Green Bay Packers
- Darrell Hill, NFL wide receiver for Kansas City Chiefs, Tennessee Titans
- Sam Hurd, NFL wide receiver for Dallas Cowboys and Chicago Bears
- LeShon Johnson, NFL running back, 1994
- Scott Kellar, nose tackle for Indianapolis Colts, Green Bay Packers, and Minnesota Vikings
- Jerry Kurz, president of Arena Football League
- Tommylee Lewis, wide receiver for New Orleans Saints and Detroit Lions
- Jordan Lynch, quarterback for Chicago Bears, Edmonton Elks of CFL, 2015 Grey Cup champion, 2015; third in 2013 Heisman Trophy voting (highest ever by NIU player)
- Justin McCareins, NFL wide receiver for Tennessee Titans and New York Jets
- Rashaan Melvin, cornerback for Tampa Bay Buccaneers, Baltimore Ravens, New England Patriots, Indianapolis Colts, Oakland Raiders and Detroit Lions
- Jake Nordin, NFL tight end/fullback for Baltimore Ravens and Detroit Lions
- Patricia Palinkas, first woman to play professional football, placekick holder in Atlantic Coast Football League for Orlando Panthers, attended NIU but did not play football
- Nathan Palmer, NFL wide receiver for Indianapolis Colts, Denver Broncos, Miami Dolphins, Chicago Bears, San Francisco 49ers and Denver Broncos
- Todd Peat, NFL guard for St. Louis Cardinals and Los Angeles Raiders
- David Petway, NFL defensive back for Green Bay Packers
- Max Scharping, NFL offensive tackle for Houston Texans
- Chad Spann, NFL running back for Pittsburgh Steelers and Houston Texans
- John Spilis, NFL wide receiver for Green Bay Packers
- Sutton Smith, NFL linebacker for Pittsburgh Steelers
- Hollis Thomas, NFL defensive tackle for Philadelphia Eagles, New Orleans Saints and Carolina Panthers
- Michael Turner, NFL running back for Atlanta Falcons
- Tim Tyrrell, NFL running back for Atlanta Falcons, St. Louis Rams and Pittsburgh Steelers
- Clarence Vaughn, defensive back for Washington Redskins, two-time Super Bowl champion, NIU Hall of Famer
- Jimmie Ward, safety for San Francisco 49ers
- Scott Wedige, NFL center for Arizona Cardinals
- Tom Wittum, NFL punter for San Francisco 49ers
- Garrett Wolfe, NFL running back for Chicago Bears, for Omaha Nighthawks of United Football League and Montreal Alouettes of Canadian Football League

==== Baseball ====
- Dan Bellino, MLB umpire
- Ned Colletti, former MLB general manager and current analyst for Los Angeles Dodgers
- Davy Jones, former MLB player
- Fritz Peterson, former MLB pitcher with New York Yankees
- Tom Tennant, former MLB player with the St. Louis Browns
- Larry Young, former MLB umpire

==== Basketball ====
- Kenny Battle, former NBA player
- Jim Bradley, former ABA player
- Paul Dawkins, former NBA player
- Eugene German (born 1997), basketball player in the Israeli Basketball Premier League
- Billy Harris, former ABA player
- Richard Oruche, former player for Nigerian national team, 2012 Olympic Games and for NIU until transfer to University of Illinois Springfield
- Xavier Silas, former NBA player for Washington Wizards, Philadelphia 76ers and Boston Celtics
- Donald Whiteside, former NBA player
- Bob Wood, former NBA player

==== Professional wrestling ====
- Brad Bradley, wrestler, B.A. History, 2004
- Maria Kanellis, wrestler and valet
- Marty Lurie, professional wrestling manager and announcer, B.A., Political Science, 1995

==== Other ====
- Curtis Blaydes (attended), professional mixed martial artist, UFC heavyweight contender
- Aimee Boorman, head coach of U.S. women gymnastics team at 2016 Summer Olympics, attended NIU for a year before leaving to coach
- Farell Duclair, Canadian football player, transferred from Vanier College to play for Northern Illinois Huskies
- Tim Gullikson, professional tennis player
- Tom Gullikson, professional tennis player
- Ken Henry, speed skater and gold medalist at the 1952 Winter Olympics
- Steven Kazmierczak, perpetrator of the shooting at NIU in February 2008
- Terry Martin, professional MMA fighter; B.A., Psychology, 2004

=== Politics and government ===
==== Federal government ====
- Don Bacon, Republican congressman from Nebraska's 2nd congressional district and retired United States Air Force Brigadier General
- Tammy Duckworth, U.S. senator from Illinois; previously served as a congresswoman, representing Illinois's 8th congressional district, 2013–2017; was a Ph.D. candidate at NIU
- Dennis Hastert, Republican U.S. congressman 1987–2008; longest-serving Republican speaker of the House; M.S., Education, 1967
- Robin Kelly, Democratic congresswoman from Illinois's 2nd congressional district, earned Ph.D. at NIU
- Andrew L. Traver, civilian director of the Naval Criminal Investigative Service
- W. Willard Wirtz, United States secretary of labor during Kennedy administration and Johnson administration, took classes at NIU (then Northern Illinois State Teachers College), member of Alpha Phi Omega chapter; graduated from Beloit College

==== State legislators ====
===== Colorado =====
- John Buckner, Democratic member of the Colorado House of Representatives, representing the 40th district from 2012 until his death in 2015

===== Florida =====
- Bill Heller, Democratic member of the Florida House of Representatives, representing the 52nd district 2007–2011

===== Illinois =====
- Steven Andersson, Republican member of the Illinois House of Representatives since 2015
- Ralph C. Capparelli, Democratic member of the Illinois House of Representatives, 1971–2004
- Cristina Castro, Democratic member of the Illinois since 2017; earned her Bachelor of Science and master of business administration at NIU
- Annazette Collins, Democratic member of the Illinois State Senate, representing the 5th district, 2011–2013; served in the Illinois House of Representatives, representing the 10th District, 2001–2011
- Michael Crawford, Democratic member of the Illinois House of Representatives since 2025; earned his Bachelor of Science and Master of Science in Education at NIU
- John Curran, Republican member of the Illinois Senate since 2017
- Joe Dunn, Republican member of the Illinois House of Representatives, 2003–2009
- Roger L. Eddy, Republican member of the Illinois House of Representatives, 2003–2012
- Beverly Fawell, Republican member of the Illinois House of Representatives (1981–1983) and the Illinois Senate (1983–1999)
- Gene L. Hoffman, Republican member of the Illinois House of Representatives, 1967–1991; earned his master's and doctorate degrees from NIU
- Joyce Holmberg, Democratic member of the Illinois Senate, 1983–1993
- Toi Hutchinson, Democratic member of the Illinois Senate since 2009
- Christine J. Johnson, Republican member of the Illinois Senate, 2011–2013
- Wendell E. Jones, Republican member of the Illinois Senate, 1998–2007
- Jeremiah E. Joyce, Democratic member of the Illinois Senate, 1979–1993; served as a member of the NIU Board of Trustees
- Doris Karpiel, Republican member of the Illinois Senate, 1984–2003; served in the Illinois House of Representatives, 1979–1984; earned her B.A. in political science from NIU
- Nancy Kaszak, Democratic member of the Illinois House of Representatives, 1993–1997
- Stephanie Kifowit, Democratic member of the Illinois House of Representatives, representing the 84th district since 2013
- Anna Moeller, Democratic member of the Illinois House of Representatives representing the 43rd district since 2014
- Bob Morgan, Democratic member of the Illinois House of Representatives representing the 58th district as of 2019
- Ruth Munson, Republican member of the Illinois House of Representatives, 2002–2009
- Vincent Persico, Republican member of the Illinois House of Representatives, 1991–2002; earned his master's of education at NIU in 1986
- Tom Rooney, Republican member of the Illinois Senate appointed in 2016; earned his M.P.A. from NIU in 2011
- Michael V. Rotello, Democratic member of the Illinois House of Representatives 1991–1995; earned his Bachelor of Arts and did public administration graduate work at NIU
- Kathleen A. Ryg, Democratic member of the Illinois House of Representatives, 2003–2009
- Jack Schaffer, Republican member of the Illinois Senate, 1973–1999
- George Scully, Jr., Democratic member of the Illinois House of Representatives, 1997–2009
- Joe Sosnowski, Republican member of the Illinois House of Representatives since 2011
- Litesa Wallace, Democratic member of the Illinois House of Representatives since 2014
- Pennie Von Bergen Wessels, Democratic member of the Illinois House of Representatives, 1993–1995
- Lance Yednock, Democratic member of the Illinois House of Representatives, 2019–present

===== Indiana =====
- Lonnie Randolph, Democratic member of the Indiana Senate representing the 2nd district since 2008

===== Iowa =====
- Cindy Golding, Republican member of the Iowa House of Representatives, representing the 83rd district, 2023–present
- David Hartsuch, Republican member of the Iowa Senate, representing the 41st District, 2007–2011

===== Maryland =====
- Michael D. Smigiel, Sr., Republican delegate in the Maryland House of Delegates, 2003–2015

===== Michigan =====
- John Olumba, Democratic turned Independent member of the Michigan House of Representatives, 2011–2015

===== Montana =====
- Tim Furey, Democratic member of the Montana House of Representatives, representing the 91st district, 2007–2011

===== New Hampshire =====
- Susan M. Ford, Democratic member of the New Hampshire House of Representatives, representing Grafton's 3rd district since 2013
- Jay Kahn, Democratic member of the New Hampshire Senate since December 2016
- Peter B. Schmidt, Democratic member of the New Hampshire House of Representatives, representing Grafton's 3rd district since 2013

===== New York =====
- Patricia Fahy, Democratic member of the New York State Assembly, representing the 109th district since 2013
- James E. Powers, Democratic member of the New York State Assembly, 1965–1966, and the New York State Senate, 1967–1972

===== Oregon =====
- Ron Maurer, Republican member of the Oregon House of Representatives, 2007–2011; candidate for Oregon Superintendent of Public Instruction, 2010

===== Virginia =====
- John Miller, Democratic member of the Virginia Senate from January 2008 until his death in April 2016

===== Wisconsin =====
- Tim Cullen, Democratic member of the Wisconsin Senate who served two non-consecutive tenures, 1975–1989 and 2011–2015
- Dave Heaton, Republican member of the Wisconsin House of Representatives since 2015
- Jacob Leicht, Progressive member of the Wisconsin State Assembly, 1925–1927
- James A. Wright, Republican member of the Wisconsin State Assembly from 1905 until his death in 1911; attended the university when it was Northern Illinois State Normal School

==== Local officeholders ====
- John Arena, alderman for Chicago's 45th ward since 2011
- Howard Brookins Jr., alderman for Chicago's 21st ward since 2003
- Franco Coladipietro, mayor of Bloomingdale, Illinois; member of the Illinois House of Representatives, 2005–2013
- Robert Fioretti, former alderman for the 2nd Ward; candidate for mayor of Chicago in 2015
- Terry Gabinski, member of the Chicago City Council from the 32nd ward, 1969–1998
- James Laski, former city clerk of Chicago, controversial talk radio host, and author of Fall From Grace — From City Hall to Prison Walls; graduated from Northern Illinois University College of Law in 1978
- Bill Morris, mayor of Waukegan, Illinois, 1977–1985
- Ricardo Muñoz, Chicago 22nd Ward alderman since 1993
- William E. Peterson, Vernon Township Supervisor, 1977–2017; served in the Illinois General Assembly, 1983–2009

==== Judiciary ====
- Sharon J. Coleman, jurist, presidential nominee for the United States District Court for the Northern District of Illinois
- James Leon Holmes, federal judge on the United States District Court for the Eastern District of Arkansas since 2004
- Thomas W. Murphy, Cook County Circuit Court judge since 2006; Chicago alderman of the 18th ward, 1991–2006

==== Activists ====
- Markos Moulitsas, founder of the Daily Kos blog; B.A., Journalism, Political Science, B.A. Philosophy 1996
- James F. Phillips, teacher and environmentalist who led a campaign against water pollution caused by Armour and Company
- Steven Schafersman, president of Texas Citizens for Science (B.S., 1971, Geology and Biology; M.S., 1973, Geology)

==== International figures ====
- Anies Baswedan, former Minister of Education and Culture of Indonesia and former Governor of Jakarta Indonesia; earned his Ph.D. in political science from NIU
- Chel Diokno (J.D), former dean of the De La Salle University College of Law, former Philippines senatorial candidate in 2019, 2022 elections
- Andi Mallarangeng, former Minister of Youth and Sports of Indonesia
- Audley Shaw, Minister of Finance and the Public Service of Jamaica and Member of Parliament for Manchester North Eastern
- Panitan Wattanayagorn, former deputy secretary-general to the prime minister of Thailand, and acting spokesman of the Royal Thai Government
- Wu Jun, vice mayor of Guiyang, the provincial capital of Guizhou, April 2013 to September 2014; studied at NIU

== Notable faculty and staff ==
=== Academics ===
- Michael Bakalis, served as assistant professor of History and assistant dean prior to his election as Illinois superintendent of Public Instruction
- Josephine Thorndike Berry (1871-1945), professor of Domestic Science, Northern Illinois State Normal School
- John W. Darrah, judge of the United States District Court for the Northern District of Illinois; served as an adjunct at the Northern Illinois University College of Law
- P. Allan Dionisopoulos, professor of political science; political scientist and legal scholar quoted in multiple Supreme Court of the United States decisions
- Mark Emmert, president of the National Collegiate Athletic Association; professor of political science at NIU, 1983–1985
- Mike Fortner, Republican member of the Illinois House of Representatives from the 49th district, 2007–2019; currently teaches physics at NIU
- Fareed Haque, professor of Jazz and Classical Guitar Studies
- Han Kuo-Huang, former professor of music
- Romualdas Kasuba (Ph.D. 1962), engineer, academician, co-founder of the College of Engineering and Engineering Technology
- Michael J. Kolb, associate professor of anthropology
- Vernon Lattin (born 1938), president of Brooklyn College
- Lynne M. Thomas, three-time Hugo Award-winning editor; head of rare books and special collections
- George L. Trager, linguist
- Thomas C. Wiegele, professor of political science; founder of Association for Politics and the Life Sciences

=== Athletics ===
- Rod Carey, head coach for football (2012–2019)
- Lee Corso, head coach for football (1984)
- Dave Doeren, former head coach for football (2010–2012)
- Lindsey Durlacher, wrestling coach
- Marci Jobson, former head coach for women's soccer
- Jerry Kill, former head coach for football (2008–2010)
- Mark Montgomery, head coach for men's basketball (2011–2021)
- Joe Novak, former head coach for football (1996–2007)
- Ricardo Patton, former head coach for men's basketball (2007–2011)
