= Marathon Pharmaceuticals =

Former U.S. rare disease drug company

- Type: Private
- Industry: Pharmaceuticals
- Founder: Robert Altman
- Headquarters: Northbrook, Illinois, USA
- Area served: Worldwide
- Key people: Robert Altman Jeffrey S. Aronin, former Chairman and CEO
- Products: Developed drugs for high-need, small patient populations, and late stage

Marathon Pharmaceuticals LLC was a privately held biopharmaceuticals company focused on drugs for people with rare diseases. The Illinois-based company developed and manufactured therapeutics and brought them to market. It employed 100 people in four global locations. In 2017, PTC Therapeutics acquired rights to Marathon Pharmaceuticals' drug Emflaza (deflazacort) for $140 million after criticism about their plan to sell the drug at a list price of $89,000 per year to sufferers despite the fact that the same drug was available in Canada and the UK for around $1,000 per year.

== Business model ==
Marathon produced medicines for high-need, small patient populations, including patients with rare diseases as outlined by the U.S. Food and Drug Administration’s (FDA) Orphan Drug Act. The Act defines rare diseases as impacting fewer than 200,000 patients in the U.S.

Marathon developed late-stage drugs, earned regulatory approvals, and then manufactured and commercialized medicines with input from patient advocacy groups. Marathon’s regulatory efforts centered on gaining FDA approval of New Drug Applications (NDA) or Biologic License Applications (BLA).

The company provided assistance for eligible patients with financial hardship and helped patients secure other assistance through the National Organization of Rare Disorders (NORD) and similar patient support groups.

The company was criticized for their business model which uses regulatory loopholes and FDA incentives to cheaply acquire drugs to treat rare diseases and multiplying the list price to make a profit.

Marathon distributed its products in North America.

== Treatment pipeline ==
Marathon developed medications that targeted neurological, muscular, gastrointestinal and blood disorders, including deflazacort, a new medication to slow the progression of Duchenne muscular dystrophy (DMD) in patients. In January 2015, Marathon was granted fast track status from FDA for deflazacort as a potential treatment for DMD. Exondys 51 and deflazacort are, as of 2/12/2017, the only FDA-approved drugs that treat DMD. Most patients die by age 25, although recently some people have lived into their 30s and 40s with assistive devices and support.

== Deflazacort ==
On February 13, 2017, the CEO of Marathon, Jeff Aronin, announced that after four years of development and over 17 trials, the company was granted FDA approval for deflazacort (Emflaza) to treat Duchenne muscular dystrophy, a rare disease that affects approximately 15,000 young boys in the U.S. Prior to the FDA approval, less than 10% of Duchenne patients in the U.S. had access to Emflaza. Post FDA approval, all Duchenne patients have access to an FDA approved and U.S. made drug that is being covered by over 170 payers and over 45 state Medicaid programs.

Amid controversy over the proposed $89,000 wholesale price to payers, Marathon sold Emflaza and related assets to PTC Therapeutics, a firm with a 20-year history in Duchenne drug development. In Canada, the same drug, although never approved for treating Duchenne, could be purchased for around $1 per tablet and used off-label to treat the disease. According to The Wall Street Journal, the price Marathon was proposing was "roughly 70 times" more than deflazacort would cost overseas, such as in Europe where it was approved to treat 23 indications for a patient base of 83 million. In a 2015 Chicago Tribune article, parents had expressed concerns that if deflazacort were approved in the United States, FDA guidelines seemed to suggest that parents would not "be able to order it from another country." They feared a "U.S. drug could be vastly more expensive than current international rates, leaving a question about insurance coverage." Senator Bernie Sanders and Rep. Elijah Cummings are investigating the price of the drug as part of a larger investigation about the cost of pharmaceuticals.
