= Christine Comer =

American educator

Christina Castillo Comer (born 1950) is the former Director of Science in the curriculum division of the Texas Education Agency (TEA). Comer spent nine years as the Director of Science until she resigned on November 7, 2007. Comer's resignation has sparked controversy about agency politics and the debate to teach evolution in public schools versus creationism or intelligent design.

Prior to her position at the TEA, Comer was a middle school science teacher with San Antonio Independent School District.

== Controversy over evolution ==
Comer was "forced out" of her TEA position following recommendations by TEA officials for "repeated acts of misconduct and insubordination", but Comer and others believe that she was targeted based on religious concerns and the teaching of creationism in Texas public schools.

On October 26, 2007, Comer forwarded to a local online community an email message from the National Center for Science Education promoting a November 2, 2007, talk by Barbara Forrest in Austin, Texas. Forrest is a professor of philosophy at Southeastern Louisiana University who served as an expert witness in the Kitzmiller v. Dover Area School District trial, the 2005 landmark evolution-intelligent design court battle in Dover, Pennsylvania, and co-authored the book Creationism's Trojan Horse: The Wedge of Intelligent Design.

The call to fire Comer came from Lizzette Reynolds, deputy commissioner for statewide policy and programs. Reynolds, who has a degree in political science and has no teaching experience, joined the TEA in January, 2007. Reynolds previously worked for a Texas state senator, as a lobbyist, as deputy legislative director for former Texas Governor George W. Bush, and in the U.S. Department of Education. In an email to Comer's supervisors, Reynolds called the email "highly inappropriate" and "an offense that calls for termination or, at the very least, reassignment of responsibilities." Reynolds has subsequently backtracked, expressing her surprise over Comer's resignation to The Austin American-Statesman.

Shortly after sending the email, Comer was placed on administrative leave. Agency official Monica Martinez cited the e-mail in a memo recommending her termination, stating, among other complaints, that "Ms. Comer's e-mail implies endorsement of the speaker and implies that TEA endorses the speaker's position on a subject on which the agency must remain neutral."

The TEA is scheduled to review, and possibly revise, its science curriculum in 2008. Some evolution proponents worry that politicization of the TEA may increase the influence of those lobbying for teaching of creationism and intelligent design. The issue is compounded by the recent appointment of Don McLeroy as chairman of the Texas State Board of Education. McLeroy has made past comments supporting the teaching of creationism and intelligent design.

== Response ==
Newspaper editorial boards have been critical of the actions of TEA officials, including The New York Times, Houston Chronicle, Austin American-Statesman, Corpus Christi Caller-Times, Waco Tribune-Herald, and Philadelphia Daily News. and this event has garnered a fair amount of negative press coverage.

Eugenie Scott of the National Center for Science Education stated that this event "underscores the politicization of science education in Texas". University of Minnesota Morris professor PZ Myers wrote that it was surprising that Barbara Forrest's lecture should be viewed as improper for those interested in educating children appropriately. Steven Schafersman of the Texas Citizens for Science suggests that there was a change in policy at the TEA after the appointments of Don McLeroy as Chairman of the State Board of Education and Robert Scott as Commissioner of Education.

Comer described the situation in a December 7, 2007, broadcast of Science Friday on National Public Radio. Comer stated that she has received support emails from teachers across Texas expressing that they have been pressured not to teach evolution.

Over 100 Texas biology professors signed a letter on December 10, 2007 to Texas Commissioner of Education Robert Scott stating that TEA employees should not have to remain neutral on evolution.

Robert Scott hinted that there was more to the story, but he did not dare speak about it for fear of being sued. "I am really frustrated with the issue, knowing the truth and not being able to talk about it," Scott is reported as saying by the Waco Tribune-Herald. Scott told The Dallas Morning News that, "You can be in favor of science without bashing people’s faith." The New York Times reports that Comer said in response that she wanted the commissioner to indicate where Comer was "bashing anyone’s faith". “He just doesn’t get it,” Comer opined.

The Dallas Morning News drew attention to the possible role in the Comer case played by disappointment of conservative elements of the Texas community at the decision on textbook purchases in 2003. Dentist Don McLeroy, a conservative member of the State Board of Education, was unhappy with the 2003 11-4 vote to purchase biology textbooks that did not champion intelligent design. Afterwards, he is reported to have said to a church group,

How can the materialistic philosophic naturalistic base dependency of Darwinism be brought into the discussion and used for our benefit? We didn't use it. All we did was stay with evidence, and we got run over.

In July 2007, McLeroy was made chairman of the State Board of Education by Texas Governor Rick Perry.

The Washington Spectator suggests that the goal was to remove Comer prior to the meetings to revise the science standards component of the Texas Essential Knowledge and Skills document, which will influence the design of science textbooks nationwide. The Spectator conjectures that this opportunity will be used by intelligent design supporters to more aggressively press efforts to "teach the controversy", a Discovery Institute program to introduce creationism into the classroom and avoid legal jeopardy. Comer told the Spectator that since she was forced to resign, many teachers in rural Texas have contacted her to tell her that they are already being forced to teach creationism in Texas public school science classes.

== Lawsuit ==
In mid 2008, Comer filed a suit in federal court in Austin, Texas, that stated that the policy she was terminated for contravening (which required employees to be neutral on the subject of creationism) was unconstitutional, as the Supreme Court of the United States has ruled that teaching creationism as science in public schools is illegal. Comer also stated in her complaint that she was fired without due process after serving as the state science director for nearly 10 years. Her lawsuit sought a court order overturning the neutrality policy on teaching creationism and declaring that her dismissal was illegal under the Constitution and her reinstatement. A federal judge dismissed the lawsuit on March 31, 2009.

In August 2009, Comer appealed the dismissal decision to the United States Court of Appeals for the Fifth Circuit (docket 09-50401). Appeal arguments were heard in April, 2010, and the court ruled on July 2, 2010, that the TEA's policy does not violate the First Amendment's religious freedom clause because it does not advance or inhibit the practice of religion.

== See also ==
- Creation and evolution in public education
