= Chicagoland Speedway =

Motorsport track in Joliet, Illinois, United States

- Tri-oval (2001–present)
- Location: 500 Speedway Boulevard; Joliet, Illinois, United States
- Coordinates: 41°28′29″N 88°03′26″W
- Capacity: 47,000
- Owner: NASCAR (2019–present)
- Broke ground: September 28, 1999; 26 years ago
- Opened: July 12, 2001; 25 years ago
- Construction cost: $130 million USD
- Major events: Current: NASCAR Cup Series eero 400 (2001–2019, 2026-Present); NASCAR O'Reilly Auto Parts Series; Cuervo 300 (2001–2019, 2026); Owens Corning AttiCat 300 (2011–2015); Former: NASCAR Camping World Truck Series; Camping World 225 (2009–2019); IndyCar Series; Peak Antifreeze Indy 300 (2001–2010); International Race of Champions (2002–2003)
- Website: chicagolandspeedway.com

Tri-Oval (2001–present)
- Surface: Asphalt
- Length: 1.520 mi (2.446 km)
- Turns: 4
- Banking: Turns: 18° Frontstretch: 11° Backstretch: 5°
- Race lap record: 0:24.4216 (224.067 mph (360.601 km/h)) ( (United States) Buddy Rice, Dallara IR-02, 2002, IndyCar)

Chicagoland Speedway is a 1.520 mi (2.446 km) tri-oval intermediate speedway in Joliet, Illinois, United States. It has hosted various major races throughout its existence, including NASCAR and IndyCar races. It features a 47,000-seat capacity as of 2019. The track is currently owned by NASCAR and led by track general manager Jacqueline Herrera.

During the 1990s stock car racing boom, NASCAR, the Indianapolis Motor Speedway, and Menards formed the Motorsports Alliance to find a new market to construct an intermediate oval, eventually deciding on the Chicago market. After failed proposals at the DuPage Airport and the town of Plano, the city of Joliet was chosen after the Alliance partnered with the Route 66 Raceway in 1999. Construction began within the year and was completed in 2001. After 18 years of racing, due to low attendance, all major racing at the facility stopped. From 2020 until 2025, with the exception of a one-off SuperMotocross race in 2023, the facility stayed largely dormant. In 2025, NASCAR announced the revival of the track with the return of the NASCAR Cup Series in 2026 and 2027.

== Description ==
=== Configuration ===
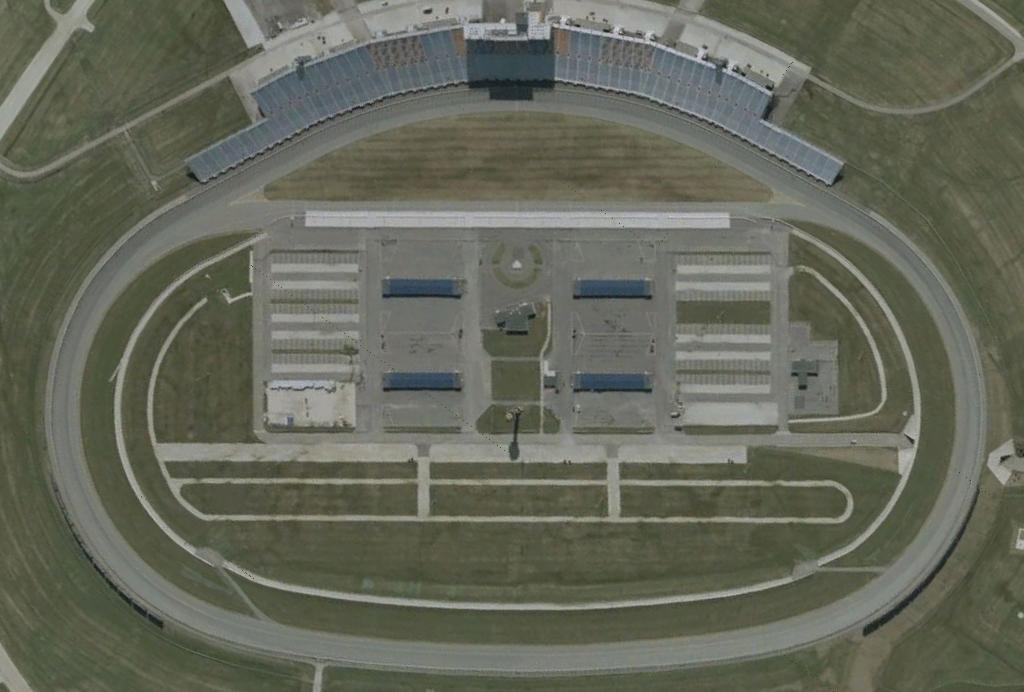
An overhead photo of the Chicagoland Speedway in 2005.

Chicagoland Speedway in its current form is measured at 1.520 mi (2.446 km), with 18° of banking in the track's turns, 11° of banking on the frontstretch, and 5° of banking on the backstretch. Unlike most intermediate oval tracks, the backstretch is a singular continuous curve instead of a straight line. The track's length has been disputed by varying sanctioning bodies; NASCAR utilized a length of 1.5 miles (2.4 km) while the IndyCar Series utilized a length of 1.52 miles (2.45 km).

=== Amenities ===
Chicagoland Speedway is located in Joliet, Illinois, and is served by Illinois Route 53 and Interstate 80. As of 2019, the facility has a seating capacity of 47,000 according to Forbes. The entire facility encompasses approximately 930 acres (380 ha) of land according to the Journal Star.

== Track history ==
=== Planning and construction ===
==== Failed proposals ====
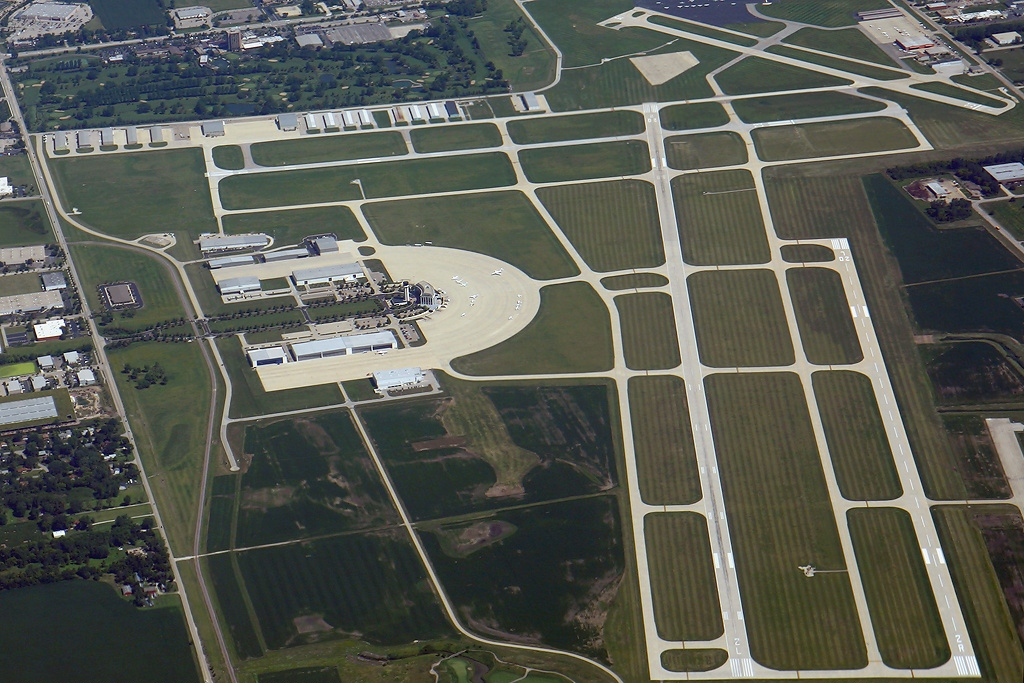
The DuPage Airport in 2013. The original plan for the Motorsports Alliance was to build a track on DuPage Airport land; however, the proposal was scrapped due to heavy public opposition.

In December 1996, DuPage Airport officials began hearing proposals of the construction of a potential racing facility on land owned by the airport. Out of three proposals, the one chosen by the airport's board was a 1.5-mile (2.4 km) intermediate oval funded by the Motorsports Alliance, a partnership between International Speedway Corporation (ISC), the Indianapolis Motor Speedway, and Menards. Initial plans for the $50 million proposal included seating capacity for 40–80 thousand and an opening date in 1999. The proposed racetrack quickly faced opposition; by February 1997, numerous anti-racetrack groups were formed, including in West Chicago and Geneva. Two months later, the plan was killed after numerous factors, including increasing public opposition, concerns about the track's environmental impact, and disagreements between DuPage Airport officials and the Motorsports Alliance in lease revenues made the location unfeasible. In August 1997, the Motorsports Alliance announced plans to pursue a location in either Plano, Illinois, or northwest Indiana. By February 1998, the proposal was narrowed to Plano; however, by January 1999, the plan was scrapped in favor for a proposal in Joliet, Illinois.

==== Joliet proposal ====
On January 6, 1999, The Charlotte Observer reported that the Motorsports Alliance was seeking to annex 930 acres (380 ha) in Joliet, with a hearing scheduled on the 19th for its approval. The location was later revealed to be a plot of land northeast of the Route 66 Raceway, with the owners of Route 66 Raceway partnering with the Alliance's proposal. On the 19th, the Joliet City Council unanimously approved the $100 million, 75,000-seat project. Within the month, the Motorsports Alliance spurred efforts for the plot of land to be included into the Des Plaines River Valley Enterprise Zone for a tax break worth up to $10 million over 10 years, which was fully approved four months later. In response to local residents' concerns regarding traffic, in February, the Alliance promised to invest $3.7 million towards nearby road improvements. In May, the Alliance announced plans to start construction in the summer of 1999 and open sometime in 2001. That same month, the Alliance and Route 66 Raceway owner Dale Coyne formed a joint company named Raceway Associates to run the facility, with the Alliance owning 75% and Coyne owning 25%. Two months later, NASCAR executive Mike Helton confirmed discussions about adding a potential NASCAR Winston Cup Series to their schedule for the 2001 season. By August, earthmovers began preparing the land for groundbreaking.

==== Construction ====
Groundbreaking on the facility occurred on September 28, 1999, with NASCAR driver Dale Earnhardt appearing as a dignitary. On May 8, 2000, track officials officially confirmed the addition of the facility to both the NASCAR Winston Cup Series and the Indy Racing League (IRL) for 2001; additionally, the track was also formally named as the "Chicagoland Speedway", with Joie Chitwood III being named as the general manager of the track. By September 2000, construction on the facility was "more than half done" according to Southtown Star writer John Debberstein, with the track itself being described as a 1.5-mile (2.4 km) oval with 18.5° of banking in the track's turns, 11° of banking on the frontstretch, and 5° of banking on the backstretch. The first tests done on the facility were conducted on October 26, with drivers John Andretti and Scott Sharp driving a NASCAR Cup car and Indy-car, respectively. On February 1, 2001, the only construction fatality occurred when worker Ehren Brandau fell while installing windows to a skybox. By the end of its construction, the entire facility cost approximately $130 million (adjusted for inflation, $236,374,742).

=== Operating years ===
Chicagoland Speedway officially opened to the public on July 12, 2001, for practice sessions for the 2001 Tropicana 400, a Cup Series race. The track's first race, a NASCAR Busch Series (now called the NASCAR O'Reilly Auto Parts Series) race, was run two days later with Jimmie Johnson winning the first race at the track. A day later, the Tropicana 400 was run, with Kevin Harvick winning the first highlight race at the facility. The track's first Indy Racing League (now called the IndyCar Series) occurred on September 2, with Jaques Lazier winning the event. A year later, the track recorded the closest finish in IndyCar history, with Sam Hornish Jr. winner over Al Unser Jr. by 0.0024 seconds. In 2003, Matthew Alexander replaced Chitwood as the general manager of Chicagoland Speedway. The following year, SAFER barriers were installed throughout the entire outside perimeter of the track at a cost of approximately $1.5 million.

In February 2007, ISC bought out Raceway Associates for $102.4 million, taking full control over both Chicagoland Speedway and Route 66 Raceway. (Note: "International Speedway Completes Acquisition of Raceway Associates" (Press release). U.S. Securities and Exchange Commission. February 8, 2007.) A month later, Alexander was promoted to president of the speedway. Within the year, Alexander announced the installation of lights to accommodate night racing; the $17 million installation was completed in time for the 2008 LifeLock.com 400. In 2009, Alexander stepped down as president of the speedway, with Craig Rust replacing Alexander. Rust's tenure was brief; he stepped down in September 2010 and was replaced by Scott Paddock four months later. In the 2010s, the track underwent two seating capacity declines due to attendance declines: one in 2013 that decreased capacity to 55,000, and one in 2019 that decreased capacity to 47,000. Also in 2019, the facility was bought out by NASCAR when the sanctioning body bought out ISC.

=== Vacant years and return of NASCAR ===
Although a NASCAR Cup Series race was scheduled in 2020, the race was canceled due to the COVID-19 pandemic. In May 2020, plans were made to convert 82 acres (33 ha) of the facility's parking lots into warehouse storage; however, the plan faced opposition from the Joliet City Council Economic Development Committee and was rejected by the Joliet Plan Commission in August. In September, NASCAR announced that all three national series would not return to Chicagoland Speedway for the 2021 season, leaving the track with an uncertain future. Paddock resigned as president a month later. The track was left widely dormant in the following years after NASCAR's departure. In 2022, the track was used to store vehicles awaiting computer chips from the Ford Motor Company in the midst of the 2021 global semiconductor shortage. The following year, the SuperMotocross World Championship announced that they would host races at the facility for their 2023 season. The event ran in September, becoming the first motorsports event at the facility in over four years.

On July 30, 2025, The Athletic reported that the Cup Series was expected to return to the facility in 2026 following the removal of a race at the Chicago Street Course. The series' return was officially announced a month later, with NASCAR scheduling Cup Series, O'Reilly Auto Parts Series, and ARCA Series races on Independence Day weekend of the 2026 NASCAR season. The Cup Series race is scheduled to be the first Cup Series race at the facility since 2019. In November, Jacqueline "Jacque" Herrera, previously the director of community relations for the Chicago Street Course, was appointed as the general manager of the track.

== Events ==
=== Racing events ===
==== NASCAR ====
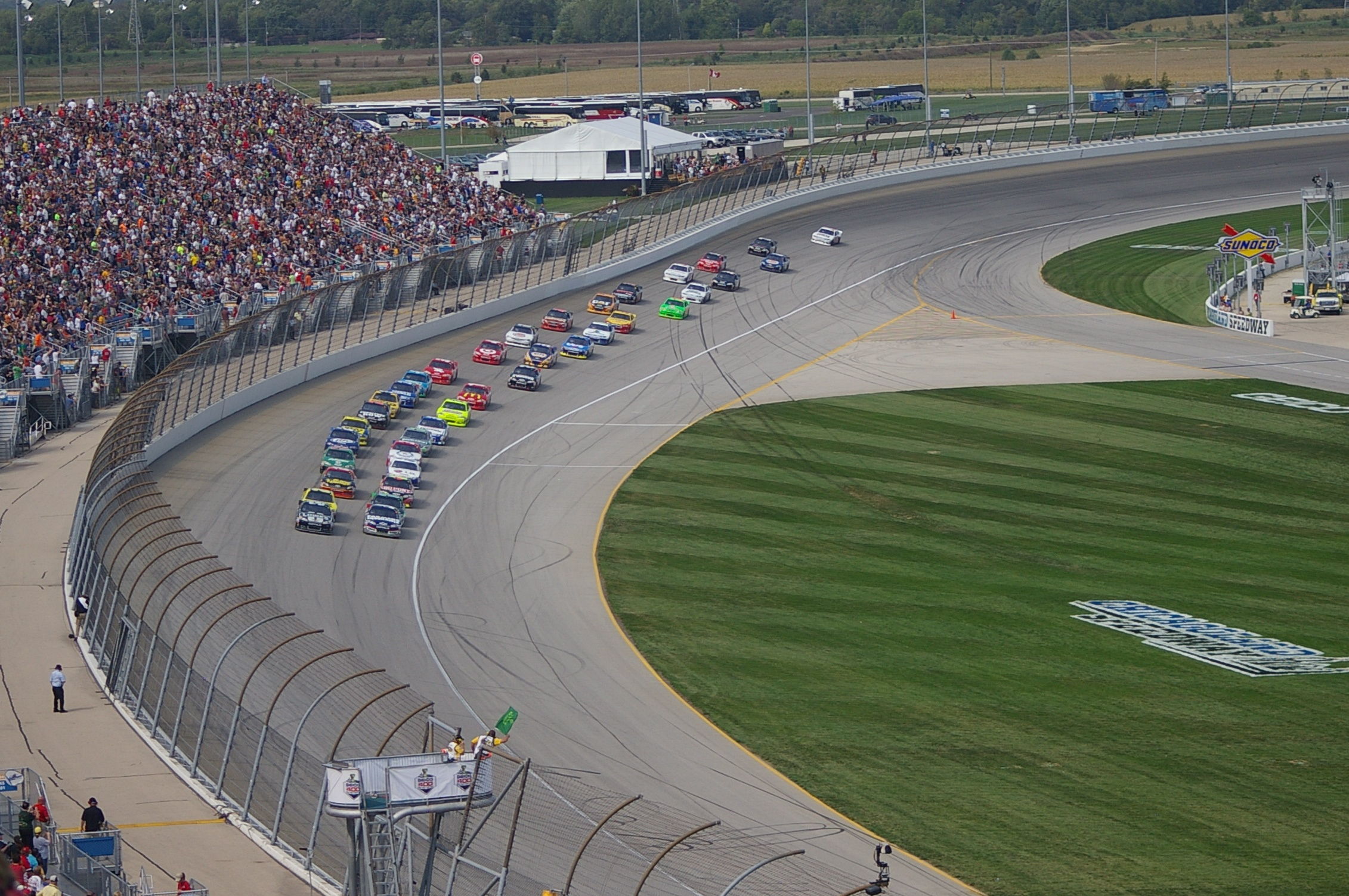
NASCAR racing at Chicagoland Speedway in 2012. From 2001 to 2019, the NASCAR Cup Series raced at the facility annually.

Chicagoland Speedway is scheduled to host an annual NASCAR weekend highlighted by the NASCAR Cup Series' eero 400 starting in 2026; the first race at the facility since 2019. The track is also scheduled to host a NASCAR O'Reilly Auto Parts Series race. Chicagoland Speedway formerly hosted a NASCAR Truck Series race last known as the Camping World 225 alongside another standalone NASCAR O'Reilly Series race last known as the Owens Corning AttiCat 300.

==== IndyCar Series ====
From 2001 to 2010, Chicagoland Speedway hosted one annual IndyCar Series weekend: the Peak Antifreeze Indy 300. In 2006, the race was moved to become the season finale of the IndyCar season. The move lasted for three seasons; in 2009, the season finale was switched for the Homestead–Miami Speedway. The race was dropped after the 2010 season.

==== Other racing events ====
- From 2002 to 2003, Chicagoland Speedway hosted the International Race of Champions (IROC).
- In 2023, the facility hosted the second round of the SuperMotocross World Championship.

=== Non-racing events ===
From May 24–26, 2013, Chicagoland Speedway held a branch of the Electric Daisy Carnival, drawing an attendance of approximately 65,000.

== Lap records ==
As of June 2019, the fastest official race lap records at Chicagoland Speedway are listed as:

Category	Time	Driver	Vehicle	Event
Tri-Oval (2001–present): 1.520 mi (2.446 km)
IndyCar	0:24.4216	Buddy Rice	Dallara IR-02	2002 Delphi Indy 300
Indy Lights	0:28.3159	Travis Gregg	Dallara IPS	2004 Chicagoland Indy Lights round
NASCAR Cup	0:29.736	Kyle Busch	Toyota Camry	2017 Tales of the Turtles 400
NASCAR O'Reilly Series	0:30.864	Cole Custer	Ford Mustang	2019 Camping World 300
NASCAR Truck	0:30.896	Brett Moffitt	Chevrolet Silverado	2019 Camping World 225
