= Candice McQueen =

U.S. academic administrator

18th President of Lipscomb University
- Incumbent
- Assumed office August 4, 2021
- Preceded by: L. Randolph Lowry III

23rd Commissioner of the Tennessee Department of Education
- In office January 2015 – January 2019
- Governor: Bill Haslam
- Preceded by: Kevin S. Huffman
- Succeeded by: Penny Schwinn

Personal details
- Born: Clarksville, Tennessee, U.S.
- Children: 2
- Education: Lipscomb University; Vanderbilt University; University of Texas at Austin

Candice McQueen is an American academic administrator serving as the 18th president of Lipscomb University since 2021. She is the first female chief executive officer of a university associated with the Churches of Christ. McQueen was the CEO of the National Institute for Excellence in Teaching from 2019 to 2021. She served as the commissioner of the Tennessee Department of Education from 2015 to 2019.

== Life ==
McQueen was born to Brenda and Nelson Hunter. She is from Clarksville, Tennessee. She lived in Iran for three years while her parents taught at the Tehran American School. She completed a B.S. from Lipscomb University. From 1996 to 1998, McQueen taught 5th grade at Lipscomb Middle School. She earned an M.Ed. in school administration from Vanderbilt Peabody College of Education and Human Development in 1998. She taught for three years at Lakeway Elementary in Austin, Texas. McQueen completed a Ph.D. in curriculum studies at the University of Texas.

McQueen was an adjunct faculty member at Vanderbilt University. She served as an assistant instructor and supervisor of student teachers at the University of Texas at Austin. McQueen joined the College of Education at Lipscomb University in August 2001. She served as chair of the undergraduate education department from 2004 to 2008. She became dean of the College of Education in July 2008. In November 2013, McQueen was also appointed senior vice president. She served as dean and senior vice president until December 2014. In January 2015, McQueen was appointed by Governor Bill Haslam as commissioner of the Tennessee Department of Education. She served in the role until January 2019.

McQueen was the chief executive officer of the National Institute for Excellence in Teaching (NIET), founded by educational reformer and philanthropist Lowell Milken, from January 2019 to August 2021. On August 4, 2021, She became the 18th president of Lipscomb University. She succeeded L. Randolph Lowry III. She is the first female president of a university associated with the Churches of Christ.

McQueen married Andy McQueen and has a son and daughter.
