= Roger Marquardt =

American lobbyist and politician (1936–2012)

Roger Marquardt (October 23, 1936 – May 16, 2012) was an American lobbyist and politician who served as a Republican member of the Illinois House of Representatives. Marquardt was born October 23, 1936, in Lombard, Illinois. He began his career as a police officer with Lombard rising to the rank of Deputy Chief before switching careers and opening a Century 21 location in DuPage. He was involved in professional issues and became a lobbyist for the Illinois Realtors. In 1966, he managed Pate Philips' first race for the Illinois House of Representatives. In 1981, he was appointed Chief Executive Officer for the DuPage Airport. Ten years later, he was appointed by Jim Edgar to serve as Assistant to the Secretary of the Illinois Department of Transportation. On January 9, 2002, he was appointed to serve the remainder of Vincent Persico's term in the 92nd General Assembly. He then returned to lobbying, dividing his time between Galena and Springfield. He served as the Chair of the Jo Daviess County Republican Party and supported the presidential campaign of former New York City Mayor Rudy Giuliani during the 2008 Republican Party presidential primaries. He died May 16, 2012.
