= Thomas C. Wiegele =

American political scientist

- Born: 1932
- Died: August 9, 1991 (age 58); DeKalb, Illinois, US
- Education: University of Pennsylvania
- Alma mater: Marquette University
- Occupation(s): Professor, author
- Organization: Association for Politics and the Life Sciences
- Known for: Contributions to biopolitics
- Notable work: Leaders Under Stress
- Title: Founder and Executive Director, Association for Politics and the Life Sciences
- Term: 1981–1991
- Successor: James. N. Schubert
- Spouse: Mary (ne. Preo) Wiegele
- Children: 5

Thomas C. Wiegele (1932–1991) was a pioneer in the field of biopolitics. He founded the Association for Politics and the Life Sciences, and was its executive director for over a decade.

== Biography ==
Wiegele received his bachelor's degree from Marquette University in 1956. His master's degree and Ph.D. in political science were from the University of Pennsylvania.

He was a professor of political science at St. Joseph's University in Philadelphia before accepting a position at Northern Illinois University, where he was the director of the Program for Biosocial Research. He was the founding editor of the journal Politics and the Life Sciences, holding the post from 1981 to 1991.

Wiegele's research included a study of the effects of international situations on world leaders. He analyzed voice recordings of world leaders to determine their stress levels. His paper, Leaders Under Stress, was presented to the International Political Science Association in Moscow in 1979.

Wiegele married Mary Preo in 1956 in Milwaukee, Wisconsin. They had three sons and two daughters - Joseph, Madelynn, Edward, Thomas and Katherine.

Wiegele died of an aneurysm on August 9, 1991, in DeKalb, Illinois. He had been planning to retire the day before and had been given a retirement party two days before his death.

== Honors ==
The Thomas C. Wiegele Interdisciplinary Dissertation Completion Award is presented to Northern Illinois University Ph.D. students writing a dissertation that bridges two academic fields. Wiegele was a Presidential Research Professor at Northern Illinois University.

== Bibliography ==
Wiegele authored or co-authored numerous books and articles in the field of biopolitics, including:

Wiegele, Thomas C. (1977). Robins, Robert S (ed.). Models of stress and disturbances in elite political behaviors: Psychological variables and political decision-making. Tulane studies in political science. New Orleans: Tulane University. OCLC 34495904.
——— (1979). Biopolitics: Search for a more human political science. Westview Special Studies. Boulder, CO: Westview Press. OCLC 474018181.
——— (1982). Biology and the Social Sciences: An emerging revolution. graph. Darst. Boulder, CO: Westview Press. ISBN 978-0-86531-201-2.
———; et al. (1985). Wiegele, Thomas C (ed.). Leaders Under Stress: A psychophysiological analysis of international crises. Duke Press policy studies. Durham, NC: Duke University Press. ISBN 978-0-8223-0641-2.
——— (1986). The Social Impacts of Biotechnology: an annotated bibliography of recent works. DeKalb, IL: Association for Politics and the Life Sciences, Northern Illinois University. OCLC 14256463.
——— (Winter 1990). "Presidential Physicians and Presidential Health Care: Some theoretical and operational considerations related to political decision making". Presidential Studies Quarterly. 20 (1). Blackwell: 71–89. JSTOR 20700115.
——— (1991). Biotechnology and International Relations: The political dimensions. Gainesville, FL: University of Florida Press. ISBN 978-0-8130-1055-7.
——— (1992). The Clandestine Building of Libya's Chemical Weapons Factory: A study in international collusion. Southern Illinois University Press. ISBN 978-0-8093-1775-2.
