= Ralph H. Barger =

American lithographer, publisher, and politician (1923–2002)

Ralph Hurt Barger, Jr. (January 24, 1923 – April 2, 2002) was an American printer, lithographer, publisher, and politician.

== Biography ==
Ralph Hurt Barger, Jr. was born on January 24, 1923 in Oak Park, Illinois. Barger graduated from Glenbard High School. He served in the United States Army Air Forces during World War II as a photographer. Barger was a printer, lithographer, and publisher. He served as Mayor of Wheaton, Illinois from 1971 to 1982 and was involved with the Republican Party. In the 1982 Republican primary, Gerald R. Weeks, a past chairman of the DuPage County Board, defeated Barger to win the Republican nomination in the 39th district. After Weeks's death on June 28, 1982, Kenneth C. Cole was appointed by the Republican Party to replace Weeks as the Republican nominee. However, Representative-elect Cole died prior to the start of the General Assembly to which he had been elected. Republicans appointed Barger to the subsequent vacancy and Barger took office at the start of the 83rd General Assembly.

Barger then served in the Illinois House of Representatives from 1983 to 1991. In the 1990 Republican primary, Barger was defeated for renomination by Vincent Persico, a Milton Township trustee who had challenged him in the two prior primary elections. He died from cancer at his home in Wheaton, Illinois.
