= Penny Schwinn =

American educator

24th Commissioner of the Tennessee Department of Education
- In office February 1, 2019 – July 1, 2023
- Governor: Bill Lee
- Preceded by: Candice McQueen; Lyle Alishie (acting)
- Succeeded by: Lizzette Reynolds

Personal details
- Born: 1982 (age 43–44) Sacramento, California
- Spouse: Paul Schwinn
- Education: University of California, Berkeley (BA); Johns Hopkins University (MA); Claremont Graduate University (PhD)

Penny Schwinn (born 1982) is an American educator who served as Education Commissioner of Tennessee from 2019 to 2023.

Schwinn was appointed by Governor Bill Lee on January 17, 2019, and was sworn in on February 1, 2019. In May 2023, Schwinn resigned to work for the University of Florida. In January 2025, she was nominated by President-elect Donald Trump to serve as the United States Deputy Secretary of Education. On July 31, 2025, Secretary Linda McMahon announced that Schwinn's candidacy for Deputy Secretary had been withdrawn.

== Early life and education ==
Schwinn was born and raised in Sacramento, California. Her mother was an educator for low-income students in Sacramento for nearly 40 years. Many of her extended family are also educators. After graduating high school, she went on to receive her Bachelor of Arts from the University of California, Berkeley, then Master of Arts in Teaching from Johns Hopkins University, and her PhD in Education Policy from Claremont Graduate University.

== Career ==
Schwinn began her career in education as a high school history and economics teacher in Baltimore, Maryland. She also has been involved in education in South Los Angeles and has worked in the private sector. She then served on the board of education for Sacramento County, California. After being a principal and board member, she served as the Assistant Secretary of Education of Delaware. She later served as the Deputy Commissioner of Standards and Engagement, Deputy Commissioner of Special Populations and Monitoring, and Chief Deputy Commissioner of Academics at the Texas Education Agency.

Appointment as Tennessee Commissioner of Education Penny Schwinn was appointed by Governor Bill Lee on January 17, 2019, and was sworn in on February 1, 2019 as Commissioner of the Tennessee Department of Education. She came to the role at age 36 after serving as chief deputy commissioner of academics at the Texas Education Agency from 2016 to 2019, and earlier as a leader at the Delaware Department of Education. Her starting salary was $200,000 annually, matching that of her predecessor Candice McQueen.

Major Initiatives Early Literacy and Reading 360 Schwinn made early literacy the signature priority of her tenure. During a special legislative session in January 2021, the General Assembly passed the Tennessee Literacy Success Act and related legislation establishing the Reading 360 initiative, which required phonics-based instruction grounded in the science of reading, mandated universal reading screeners, and funded large-scale educator training. After the 2021 literacy law passed, roughly 30,000 Tennessee teachers received summer training in the science of reading.

Schwinn also championed the state's controversial third-grade retention law, which required students not meeting reading expectations on the TCAP to face potential retention unless they completed tutoring or summer programming. The statute drew significant parent and educator opposition, and Governor Lee later softened the requirement to let parents and educators decide whether students should be retained.

School Funding Reform (TISA) In 2022, Schwinn led the replacement of Tennessee's 30-year-old Basic Education Program (BEP) with the Tennessee Investment in Student Achievement (TISA) Act, a student-based funding formula providing base per-pupil funding plus weights for low-income students, English learners, students with disabilities, characteristics of dyslexia, and students in sparse or small communities. The TISA development process incorporated 18 stakeholder committees, statewide town halls, and over 1,300 public comments Yahoo!, and the reform was accompanied by a roughly 20% increase in state dollars for public education.

Teacher Workforce Schwinn established Tennessee as the first state with a federally recognized registered teacher apprenticeship program, a model subsequently adopted by other states. She also supported legislation raising the statewide minimum teacher salary to $50,000 by 2027.

COVID-19 Response and Acceleration Schwinn oversaw Tennessee's pandemic response and learning-recovery effort. Tennessee was among the first states to get students back in the classroom in 2020 Tennessee Government, and Reading 360 was paired with what the state described as the largest permanent summer school program serving pre-K–9th grade and the largest state tutoring program in the country, with more than 200,000 students served.

Innovative School Models She directed Tennessee's Innovative School Models grant, described as a $500 million statewide high school initiative to align K-12, post-secondary, and workforce needs FutureEd, which expanded apprenticeships and work-based learning.

Results and Outcomes NAEP Performance and National Rankings The reforms advanced during Schwinn's tenure have been widely credited with contributing to what analysts now call the "Southern Surge," a cluster of Southern states — Tennessee, Mississippi, Louisiana, and Alabama — that have outpaced the nation on the National Assessment of Educational Progress (NAEP). Between 2022 and 2024, Tennessee made a relatively fast recovery from pandemic declines Chalkbeat, and literacy advocate Karen Vaites reported that on the 2024 NAEP, Tennessee was 6th in the nation for the growth of its 4th graders and topped the country for growth of its 8th graders.

These state-level gains are reflected in comparative research published by the Oklahoma Center for Education Policy (OCEP) at the University of Oklahoma. In the February 2026 report, OCEP executive director Adam Tyner analyzed 2024 NAEP data using a pooled "NAEP Core" measure averaging 4th- and 8th-grade math and reading, which placed Tennessee as #1 in the SEC across all 4 tested content areas, and #17 in the country. The study found that among the 12 Southeastern Conference states, Tennessee ranked first and Mississippi ranked fourth, while Oklahoma ranked last Oklahoma. Tyner traced the regional shift back more than a decade, noting that Tennessee was the first of the Southern Surge states to pull ahead of Oklahoma, overtaking it in 2013, with Mississippi following in 2019 and Louisiana in 2022 Oklahoma Council of Public Affairs.

At her July 2025 Senate confirmation hearing, Schwinn framed the results in her own terms, testifying that Tennessee became one of only two states to rank in the top 25 on all 16 NAEP indicators.

Third-Grade Reading Proficiency Under her successor Lizzette Gonzalez Reynolds, Tennessee reported that students achieved the highest 3rd grade ELA proficiency rate since ELA standards were reset in 2017 Tennessee Board of Regents, a result generally attributed to Reading 360 and related policies initiated during Schwinn's tenure.

Controversies Schwinn's tenure drew friction with parts of the Tennessee General Assembly and advocacy groups: - No-bid ClassWallet contract (2019–2020): The Tennessee Department of Education granted a no-bid contract to ClassWallet to administer the ESA program, which lawmakers later questioned. - Wellness-check proposal (2020): A never-executed plan to check on children during pandemic school closures drew strong pushback from homeschool advocates.

Resignation and Departure On May 1, 2023, Schwinn announced she would step down as Commissioner on June 1, 2023 Wikipedia.1 Governor Lee named Lizzette Gonzalez Reynolds, a former Texas education official and then–vice president of policy at ExcelinEd, as her successor.

Post-Tennessee Career In January 2025, she was nominated by President-elect Donald Trump to serve as the United States Deputy Secretary of Education Wikipedia, and her nomination was advanced by the Senate HELP Committee on a 12–11 party-line vote in 2025. On July 31, 2025, Secretary Linda McMahon announced that Schwinn had withdrawn her candidacy for Deputy Secretary. She has served as an Operating Partner with The Vistria Group, a Senior Advisor for the Emerson Collective, and a Senior Advisor with White Board Associates, among other projects.

== Personal life ==
Schwinn has three children.
