= L. Randolph Lowry III =

American academic administrator

President of Lipscomb University
- In office September 2005 – September 2021
- Preceded by: Steve Flatt
- Succeeded by: Candice McQueen

Personal details
- Born: 1951 or 1952 (age 74–75) Oregon, U.S.
- Spouse: Rhonda Lowry
- Children: 3
- Education: Pepperdine University, M.A. Hamline University, J.D.

L. Randolph Lowry III, also known as Randy Lowry, (born 1951/1952) is an American academic administrator. He was the President of Lipscomb University in Nashville, Tennessee from 2005 to 2021.

== Early life ==
Lowry was born in Oregon and grew up in Long Beach, California. He graduated with a B.A. in political science and an M.A. in public administration from Pepperdine University. He obtained his J.D. from Hamline University.

== Career ==
Lowry started his career by working in the president's office at both Hamline University and Willamette University. From 1986 onwards, he taught law at Pepperdine University, where he established the Straus Institute for Dispute Resolution. He has also taught at Vermont Law School, the City University of Hong Kong, Shantou University in Beijing, China, Bond University in Gold Coast, Australia, Hamline University in Saint Paul, Minnesota, and the University of Modena in Modena, Italy.

In 2005, Lowry became President of Lipscomb University. In September 2017, he apologized after hosting a dinner at his home for African-American students where the menu was "mac n cheese, collard greens, corn bread" and the centerpieces "contained stalks of cotton," a symbol of slavery in the United States.

== Personal life ==
Lowry and his wife, Rhonda, live in Nashville. They have three children together.
