= Davy Jones (baseball) =

American baseball player (1880–1972)

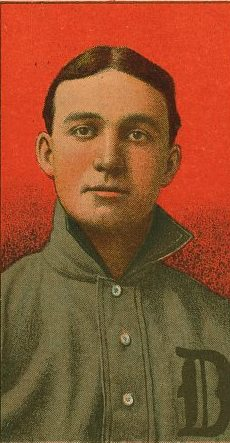
- Outfielder
- Born: June 30, 1880; Cambria, Wisconsin, U.S.
- Died: March 30, 1972 (aged 91); Mankato, Minnesota, U.S.
- Batted: Left Threw: Right

MLB debut
- September 15, 1901, for the Milwaukee Brewers

Last MLB appearance
- September 2, 1918, for the Detroit Tigers

MLB statistics
- Batting average: .270
- Home runs: 9
- Runs batted in: 288
- Stats at Baseball Reference

Teams
- Milwaukee Brewers / St. Louis Browns (1901–1902); Chicago Cubs (1902–1904); Detroit Tigers (1906–1912); Chicago White Sox (1913); Pittsburgh Rebels (1914–1915); Detroit Tigers (1918)

David Jefferson Jones (June 30, 1880 – March 30, 1972), nicknamed "Kangaroo", was an American outfielder in Major League Baseball. He played fifteen seasons with the Milwaukee Brewers / St. Louis Browns, Chicago Cubs, Detroit Tigers, Chicago White Sox, and Pittsburgh Rebels. Jones played with some of the early legends of the game, including Ty Cobb, Sam Crawford, Frank Chance, Mordecai Brown, Hugh Duffy and Jesse Burkett. He also played part of one year with the Chicago White Sox, where several of his teammates would later be implicated in the 1919 Black Sox scandal. Jones was immortalized in the classic 1966 baseball book The Glory of Their Times by Lawrence Ritter.

Jones was mostly a platoon rather than a full-time player who was decent with the bat and swift on his feet. He played in the major leagues from 1901 to 1918, compiling a .270 career batting average with 1,020 hits.

== Early years and non-baseball career ==
Born in Cambria, Wisconsin, as David Jefferson, he later changed his last name to Jones. He attended Dixon College in Dixon, Illinois, on a track and baseball scholarship, and graduated with a degree in law, but instead accepted a contract to play for the Rockford Club in Rockford, Illinois. In 1910, during his playing days, he purchased a drug store in Detroit with his brother, whose education in pharmacy he had paid for, and after retiring from baseball he himself qualified as a pharmacist at the University of Southern California.

Jones was 21 years old when he broke into the big leagues on September 15, 1901, with the Milwaukee Brewers.

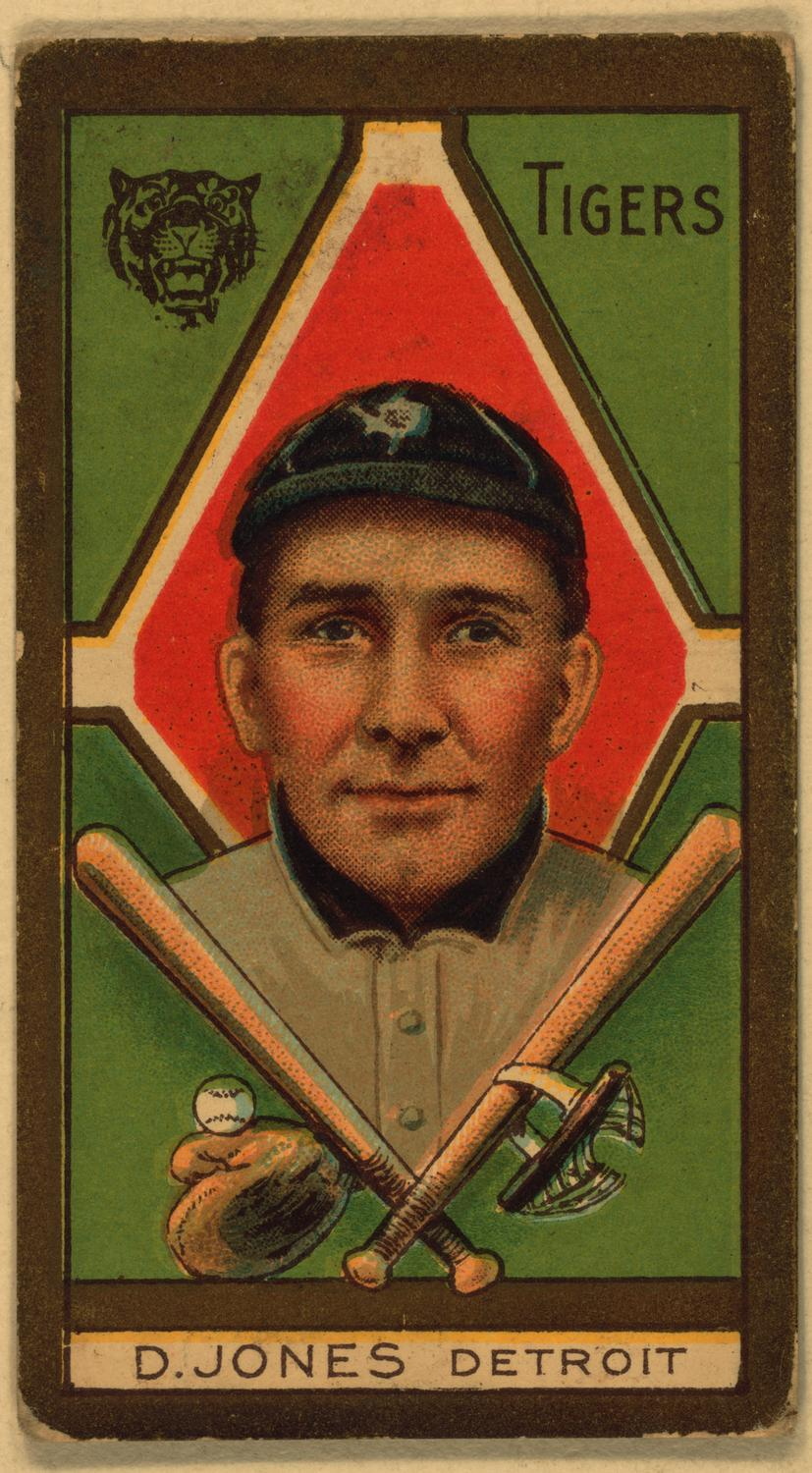

== Detroit Tigers ==
Jones spent much of his career playing outfield with the Detroit Tigers, alongside Hall of Fame outfielders, Ty Cobb and Wahoo Sam Crawford. With Cobb and Crawford solidly entrenched in the outfield, Jones was forced to battle for the 3rd outfield spot with Matty McIntyre each year from 1906 to 1910.

As a speedy leadoff man, he was a reliable run scorer with Cobb and Crawford following him in the lineup. Jones's speed also made him a fine outfielder, with tremendous range. In 1907, he made 282 putouts and had a range factor of 2.45, 58 points higher than the average outfielder of his day. Jones had his best season in 1907. That year, he had a .357 on-base percentage (the best in the American League). He also scored 101 runs, second in the American League behind his teammate Sam Crawford. Jones was also among the AL leaders in 1907 in bases on balls (60) and stolen bases (30). The Tigers advanced to the first of three consecutive World Series in 1907, and Jones batted .353 with a .476 on-base percentage in a losing effort to the Chicago Cubs. In his three World Series for the Tigers, Jones played in 18 games, had a .357 on-base percentage, scored 8 runs. In Game 5 of the 1909 World Series against the Pittsburgh Pirates, he hit the first leadoff home run in postseason history (the next home run to start a postseason game would not occur again until 1953).

== Germany Schaefer incident ==
Jones is also known for recounting a famous story in The Glory of Their Times about the early ballplayer/comedian Germany Schaefer. According to Jones, Schaefer was the only player who ever stole first base in a ballgame.

The incident evidently took place during a Detroit game versus Cleveland. With Davy Jones on third and Schaefer at first, the double steal was on. But as Schaefer slid into second base safe, the Cleveland catcher held onto the ball. In order to set up the double-steal again, Schaefer took off screaming for first on the next pitch and dove in headfirst in without a play. This stunned the players, fans and umpires, but it was perfectly legal. On the next pitch, the double steal worked.

In the same interview, Jones also mentions how, as the lead off batter for the Detroit Tigers, he was the first hitter to face the great pitcher Walter Johnson (the game in question was August 2, 1907).

== Post-retirement ==
At the age of 38, having retired from baseball and running a successful pharmacy in Detroit, Jones was inserted into one game by an old friend who was managing the ball club, Hughie Jennings. Jones attended the final game of the season as a spectator, and since the contest had no bearing on the pennant race, he and Bill Donovan (a coach) were used in the game, with Donovan getting the win (his final as a player) when Jones recorded the last putout. The baseball used in that game is in the National Baseball Hall of Fame collection and is inscribed: "Last ball used in game at Navin Field in last game of season, 1918, caught by Davy Jones. Hit by Jack Collins of the Chicago White Sox. Season ending on Labor Day on account of War." The circumstances of the play in which the ball was involved went unrecognized in the official statistical record for more than 85 years.

== See also ==
- List of Major League Baseball career stolen bases leaders
- 1909 Detroit Tigers season
- List of Northern Illinois University people
