= 2001 Tropicana 400 =

18th race of the 2001 NASCAR Winston Cup Series

Race details
- Race 18 of 36 in the 2001 NASCAR Winston Cup Series
- The 2001 Tropicana 400 program cover.
- Date: July 15, 2001
- Official name: Inaugural Tropicana 400
- Location: Joliet, Illinois, Chicagoland Speedway
- Course: Permanent racing facility
- Course length: 1.5 miles (2.41 km)
- Distance: 267 laps, 400.5 mi (644.542 km)
- Scheduled distance: 267 laps, 400.5 mi (644.542 km)
- Average speed: 121.200 miles per hour (195.052 km/h)

Pole position
Driver	Todd Bodine	Haas-Carter Motorsports
- Time: 29.393

Most laps led
Driver	Kevin Harvick	Richard Childress Racing
- Laps: 113

Winner
No. 29	Kevin Harvick	Richard Childress Racing

Television in the United States
- Network: NBC
- Announcers: Allen Bestwick, Benny Parsons, Wally Dallenbach Jr.

Radio in the United States
- Radio: Motor Racing Network

The 2001 Tropicana 400 was the 18th stock car race of the 2001 NASCAR Winston Cup Series season and the inaugural running of the event. The race was held on July 15, 2001, in Joliet, Illinois at Chicagoland Speedway, a 1.5 mile (2.41 km) tri-oval speedway. The race took the scheduled 267 laps to complete. Kevin Harvick, driving for Richard Childress Racing, would dominate the late stages of the race to win his second career NASCAR Winston Cup Series win and his second and final win of the season. To fill out the podium, Robert Pressley of Jasper Motorsports and Ricky Rudd of Robert Yates Racing would finish second and third, respectively.

== Background ==
The layout of Chicagoland Speedway, the venue where the race was held.

Chicagoland Speedway is a 1.5 miles (2.41 km) tri-oval speedway in Joliet, Illinois, southwest of Chicago. The speedway opened in 2001 and currently hosts NASCAR racing. Until 2011, the speedway also hosted the IndyCar Series, recording numerous close finishes including the closest finish in IndyCar history. The speedway is owned and operated by International Speedway Corporation and located adjacent to Route 66 Raceway.

=== Entry list ===
- (R) denotes rookie driver

#	Driver	Team	Make
1	Steve Park	Dale Earnhardt, Inc.	Chevrolet
01	Jason Leffler (R)	Chip Ganassi Racing	Dodge
2	Rusty Wallace	Penske Racing	Ford
4	Kevin Lepage	Morgan-McClure Motorsports	Chevrolet
5	Terry Labonte	Hendrick Motorsports	Chevrolet
6	Mark Martin	Roush Racing	Ford
7	Robby Gordon	Ultra Motorsports	Ford
8	Dale Earnhardt Jr.	Dale Earnhardt, Inc.	Chevrolet
9	Bill Elliott	Evernham Motorsports	Dodge
10	Johnny Benson	MBV Motorsports	Pontiac
11	Brett Bodine	Brett Bodine Racing	Ford
12	Jeremy Mayfield	Penske Racing	Ford
14	Ron Hornaday Jr. (R)	A. J. Foyt Racing	Pontiac
15	Michael Waltrip	Dale Earnhardt, Inc.	Chevrolet
17	Matt Kenseth	Roush Racing	Ford
18	Bobby Labonte	Joe Gibbs Racing	Pontiac
19	Casey Atwood (R)	Evernham Motorsports	Dodge
20	Tony Stewart	Joe Gibbs Racing	Pontiac
21	Elliott Sadler	Wood Brothers Racing	Ford
22	Ward Burton	Bill Davis Racing	Dodge
24	Jeff Gordon	Hendrick Motorsports	Chevrolet
25	Jerry Nadeau	Hendrick Motorsports	Chevrolet
26	Jimmy Spencer	Haas-Carter Motorsports	Ford
27	Mike Bliss	Eel River Racing	Pontiac
28	Ricky Rudd	Robert Yates Racing	Ford
29	Kevin Harvick (R)	Richard Childress Racing	Chevrolet
30	Jeff Green	Richard Childress Racing	Chevrolet
31	Mike Skinner	Richard Childress Racing	Chevrolet
32	Ricky Craven	PPI Motorsports	Ford
33	Joe Nemechek	Andy Petree Racing	Chevrolet
36	Ken Schrader	MB2 Motorsports	Pontiac
40	Sterling Marlin	Chip Ganassi Racing	Dodge
43	John Andretti	Petty Enterprises	Dodge
44	Buckshot Jones	Petty Enterprises	Dodge
45	Kyle Petty	Petty Enterprises	Dodge
55	Bobby Hamilton	Andy Petree Racing	Chevrolet
66	Todd Bodine	Haas-Carter Motorsports	Ford
71	Dave Marcis	Marcis Auto Racing	Chevrolet
77	Robert Pressley	Jasper Motorsports	Ford
84	Shawna Robinson	Michael Kranefuss Racing	Ford
88	Dale Jarrett	Robert Yates Racing	Ford
90	Hut Stricklin	Donlavey Racing	Ford
92	Stacy Compton	Melling Racing	Dodge
93	Dave Blaney	Bill Davis Racing	Dodge
96	Andy Houston (R)	PPI Motorsports	Ford
97	Kurt Busch (R)	Roush Racing	Ford
99	Jeff Burton	Roush Racing	Ford
Official entry list

== Practice ==
=== First practice ===
The first practice session was held on Thursday, July 12, at 2:00 PM CST, and would last for an hour and 25 minutes. Bill Elliott of Evernham Motorsports would set the fastest time in the session, with a lap of 31.477 and an average speed of 171.554 miles per hour (276.089 km/h).

Pos.	#	Driver	Team	Make	Time	Speed
1	9	Bill Elliott	Evernham Motorsports	Dodge	29.574	182.593
2	2	Rusty Wallace	Penske Racing	Ford	29.588	182.506
3	26	Jimmy Spencer	Haas-Carter Motorsports	Ford	29.633	182.402
Full first practice results

=== Second practice ===
The second practice session was held on Thursday, July 12, at 5:05 PM CST, and would last for an hour and 25 minutes. Mark Martin of Roush Racing would set the fastest time in the session, with a lap of 31.477 and an average speed of 171.554 miles per hour (276.089 km/h).

Pos.	#	Driver	Team	Make	Time	Speed
1	6	Mark Martin	Roush Racing	Ford	29.369	183.867
2	25	Jerry Nadeau	Hendrick Motorsports	Chevrolet	29.444	183.399
3	26	Jimmy Spencer	Haas-Carter Motorsports	Ford	29.471	183.231
Full second practice results

=== Third practice ===
The third practice session was held on Friday, July 13, at 11:00 AM CST, and would last for an hour and 55 minutes. Todd Bodine of Haas-Carter Motorsports would set the fastest time in the session, with a lap of 29.347 and an average speed of 183.443 miles per hour (295.223 km/h).

Pos.	#	Driver	Team	Make	Time	Speed
1	66	Todd Bodine	Haas-Carter Motorsports	Ford	29.347	183.443
2	25	Jerry Nadeau	Hendrick Motorsports	Chevrolet	29.475	183.206
3	18	Bobby Labonte	Joe Gibbs Racing	Pontiac	29.504	183.026
Full third practice results

=== Fourth practice ===
The fourth practice session was held on Saturday, July 14, at 11:30 AM CST, and would last for 45 minutes. Dale Jarrett of Robert Yates Racing would set the fastest time in the session, with a lap of 30.158 and an average speed of 179.057 miles per hour (288.164 km/h).

Pos.	#	Driver	Team	Make	Time	Speed
1	88	Dale Jarrett	Robert Yates Racing	Ford	30.158	179.057
2	24	Jeff Gordon	Hendrick Motorsports	Chevrolet	30.181	178.921
3	29	Kevin Harvick (R)	Richard Childress Racing	Chevrolet	30.195	178.838
Full fourth practice results

=== Fifth and final practice ===
The fifth and final practice session, sometimes referred to as Happy Hour, was held on Saturday, July 14, at 1:00 PM CST, and would last for 45 minutes. Jeff Gordon of Hendrick Motorsports would set the fastest time in the session, with a lap of 30.142 and an average speed of 179.152 miles per hour (288.317 km/h).

Pos.	#	Driver	Team	Make	Time	Speed
1	24	Jeff Gordon	Hendrick Motorsports	Chevrolet	30.142	179.152
2	26	Jimmy Spencer	Haas-Carter Motorsports	Ford	30.154	179.081
3	1	Steve Park	Dale Earnhardt, Inc.	Chevrolet	30.195	178.838
Full Happy Hour practice results

== Qualifying ==
Qualifying was held on Friday, July 13, at 3:05 PM CST. Each driver would have two laps to set a fastest time; the fastest of the two would count as their official qualifying lap. Positions 1-36 would be decided on time, while positions 37-43 would be based on provisionals. Six spots are awarded by the use of provisionals based on owner's points. The seventh is awarded to a past champion who has not otherwise qualified for the race. If no past champ needs the provisional, the next team in the owner points will be awarded a provisional.

Todd Bodine of Haas-Carter Motorsports would win the pole, setting a time of 29.393 and an average speed of 183.7172 miles per hour (295.6642 km/h).

Four drivers would fail to qualify: Kyle Petty, Dave Marcis, Mike Bliss, and Shawna Robinson.

=== Full qualifying results ===
Pos.	#	Driver	Team	Make	Time	Speed
1	66	Todd Bodine	Haas-Carter Motorsports	Ford	29.393	183.7172
2	26	Jimmy Spencer	Haas-Carter Motorsports	Ford	29.442	183.4115
3	28	Ricky Rudd	Robert Yates Racing	Ford	29.483	183.1564
4	9	Bill Elliott	Evernham Motorsports	Dodge	29.545	182.7720
5	33	Joe Nemechek	Andy Petree Racing	Chevrolet	29.615	182.3400
6	29	Kevin Harvick (R)	Richard Childress Racing	Chevrolet	29.644	182.1617
7	31	Mike Skinner	Richard Childress Racing	Chevrolet	29.661	182.0572
8	25	Jerry Nadeau	Hendrick Motorsports	Chevrolet	29.669	182.0082
9	40	Sterling Marlin	Chip Ganassi Racing with Felix Sabates	Dodge	29.701	181.8121
10	11	Brett Bodine	Brett Bodine Racing	Ford	29.722	181.6836
11	88	Dale Jarrett	Robert Yates Racing	Ford	29.733	181.6164
12	36	Ken Schrader	MBV Motorsports	Pontiac	29.808	181.1594
13	77	Robert Pressley	Jasper Motorsports	Ford	29.830	181.0260
14	96	Andy Houston (R)	PPI Motorsports	Ford	29.842	180.9530
15	01	Jason Leffler (R)	Chip Ganassi Racing with Felix Sabates	Dodge	29.846	180.9290
16	14	Ron Hornaday Jr. (R)	A. J. Foyt Racing	Pontiac	29.847	180.9227
17	19	Casey Atwood	Evernham Motorsports	Dodge	29.869	180.7894
18	6	Mark Martin	Roush Racing	Ford	29.887	180.6806
19	4	Kevin Lepage	Morgan-McClure Motorsports	Chevrolet	29.898	180.6141
20	21	Elliott Sadler	Wood Brothers Racing	Ford	29.899	180.6080
21	2	Rusty Wallace	Penske Racing	Ford	29.903	180.5840
22	55	Bobby Hamilton	Andy Petree Racing	Chevrolet	29.912	180.5296
23	43	John Andretti	Petty Enterprises	Dodge	29.926	180.4450
24	18	Bobby Labonte	Joe Gibbs Racing	Pontiac	29.942	180.3487
25	92	Stacy Compton	Melling Racing	Dodge	29.969	180.1860
26	22	Ward Burton	Bill Davis Racing	Dodge	29.987	180.0780
27	20	Tony Stewart	Joe Gibbs Racing	Pontiac	29.990	180.0600
28	24	Jeff Gordon	Hendrick Motorsports	Chevrolet	29.994	180.0360
29	30	Jeff Green	Richard Childress Racing	Chevrolet	29.999	180.0060
30	1	Steve Park	Dale Earnhardt, Inc.	Chevrolet	30.027	179.8380
31	97	Kurt Busch	Roush Racing	Ford	30.030	179.8202
32	99	Jeff Burton	Roush Racing	Ford	30.044	179.7364
33	32	Ricky Craven	PPI Motorsports	Ford	30.045	179.7304
34	10	Johnny Benson	MBV Motorsports	Pontiac	30.046	179.7244
35	93	Dave Blaney	Bill Davis Racing	Dodge	30.059	179.6467
36	8	Dale Earnhardt Jr.	Dale Earnhardt, Inc.	Chevrolet	30.085	179.4914
Provisionals
37	17	Matt Kenseth	Roush Racing	Ford	-	-
38	12	Jeremy Mayfield	Penske Racing	Ford	-	-
39	15	Michael Waltrip	Dale Earnhardt, Inc.	Chevrolet	-	-
40	5	Terry Labonte	Hendrick Motorsports	Chevrolet	-	-
41	7	Robby Gordon	Ultra Motorsports	Ford	-	-
42	90	Hut Stricklin	Donlavey Racing	Ford	-	-
43	44	Buckshot Jones	Petty Enterprises	Dodge	-	-
Failed to Qualify
44	45	Kyle Petty	Petty Enterprises	Dodge	30.102	179.4560
45	71	Dave Marcis	Marcis Auto Racing	Chevrolet	30.300	178.2180
46	27	Mike Bliss	Eel River Racing	Pontiac	30.495	177.0780
47	84	Shawna Robinson	Michael Kranefuss Racing	Ford	30.807	175.2850
Official qualifying results

== Race results ==
Fin.	#	Driver	Team	Make	Laps	Led	Status	Pts	Winnings
1	29	Kevin Harvick (R)	Richard Childress Racing	Chevrolet	267	113	running	185	$162,500
2	77	Robert Pressley	Jasper Motorsports	Ford	267	0	running	170	$126,600
3	28	Ricky Rudd	Robert Yates Racing	Ford	267	25	running	170	$112,600
4	88	Dale Jarrett	Robert Yates Racing	Ford	267	0	running	160	$101,300
5	26	Jimmy Spencer	Haas-Carter Motorsports	Ford	267	50	running	160	$94,200
6	6	Mark Martin	Roush Racing	Ford	267	20	running	155	$77,100
7	17	Matt Kenseth	Roush Racing	Ford	267	0	running	146	$70,650
8	97	Kurt Busch (R)	Roush Racing	Ford	267	0	running	142	$68,100
9	40	Sterling Marlin	Chip Ganassi Racing with Felix Sabates	Dodge	267	0	running	138	$65,900
10	9	Bill Elliott	Evernham Motorsports	Dodge	267	0	running	134	$71,080
11	8	Dale Earnhardt Jr.	Dale Earnhardt Inc.	Chevrolet	267	0	running	130	$70,800
12	93	Dave Blaney	Bill Davis Racing	Dodge	267	0	running	127	$54,800
13	2	Rusty Wallace	Penske Racing	Ford	267	0	running	124	$69,300
14	66	Todd Bodine	Haas-Carter Motorsports	Ford	267	6	running	126	$58,300
15	21	Elliott Sadler	Wood Brothers Racing	Ford	267	2	running	123	$71,600
16	33	Joe Nemechek	Andy Petree Racing	Ford	267	17	running	120	$62,600
17	24	Jeff Gordon	Hendrick Motorsports	Chevrolet	267	0	running	112	$68,300
18	99	Jeff Burton	Roush Racing	Ford	266	0	running	109	$69,100
19	11	Brett Bodine	Brett Bodine Racing	Ford	266	0	running	106	$52,000
20	22	Ward Burton	Bill Davis Raving	Dodge	266	0	running	103	$62,600
21	32	Ricky Craven	PPI Motorsports	Ford	266	0	running	100	$52,900
22	15	Michael Waltrip	Dale Earnhardt Inc.	Chevrolet	266	0	running	97	$57,900
23	43	John Andretti	Petty Enterprises	Dodge	266	0	running	94	$58,900
24	01	Jason Leffler (R)	Chip Ganassi Racing with Felix Sabates	Dodge	266	0	running	91	$58,600
25	5	Terry Labonte	Hendrick Motorsports	Chevrolet	266	0	running	88	$58,300
26	92	Stacy Compton	Melling Racing	Dodge	266	0	running	85	$50,500
27	10	Johnny Benson	MBV Motorsports	Pontiac	266	3	running	87	$57,900
28	19	Casey Atwood (R)	Evernham Motorsports	Dodge	265	0	running	79	$46,700
29	36	Ken Schrader	MBV Motorsports	Pontiac	265	0	running	76	$54,500
30	55	Bobby Hamilton	Andy Petree Racing	Chevrolet	264	0	running	73	$54,800
31	90	Hut Stricklin	Donlavey Racing	Ford	262	0	running	70	$46,100
32	12	Jeremy Mayfield	Penske Racing	Ford	259	0	running	67	$63,900
33	20	Tony Stewart	Joe Gibbs Racing	Pontiac	257	0	crash	64	$65,900
34	4	Kevin Lepage	Morgan-McClure Motorsports	Chevrolet	255	0	crash	61	$45,500
35	7	Robby Gordon	Ultra Motorsports	Ford	252	0	crash	58	$53,300
36	30	Jeff Green	Richard Childress Racing	Chevrolet	243	0	engine	55	$45,100
37	25	Jerry Nadeau	Hendrick Motorsports	Chevrolet	239	25	engine	57	$52,900
38	44	Buckshot Jones	Petty Enterprises	Dodge	184	0	crash	49	$52,700
39	18	Bobby Labonte	Joe Gibbs Racing	Pontiac	168	2	engine	51	$69,500
40	14	Ron Hornady Jr. (R)	A. J. Foyt Racing	Pontiac	150	0	engine	43	$44,300
41	1	Steve Park	Dale Earnhardt Inc.	Chevrolet	134	0	flywheel	40	$52,100
42	31	Mike Skinner	Richard Childress Racing	Chevrolet	22	0	crash	37	$51,900
43	96	Andy Houston (R)	PPI Motorsports	Ford	3	0	engine	34	$43,950
Official race results

Previous race: 2001 Pepsi 400	NASCAR Winston Cup Series; 2001 season	Next race: 2001 New England 300
