= Tim Furey =

American politician

Member of the Montana House of Representatives from the 91st district
- In office May 2007 – January 2013
- Preceded by: Kevin Furey
- Succeeded by: David "Doc" Moore

Personal details
- Born: June 29, 1954 (age 72)
- Party: Democratic
- Education: University of Montana (B.A.); Northern Illinois University (MPA)
- Profession: Nonprofit Administrator

Tim Furey was a Democratic member of the Montana House of Representatives, representing the 91st district from October 2007 to January 2013.

== Montana House of Representatives ==
In 2004, Tim Furey's son Kevin was elected to the Montana House of Representatives. Kevin served for three years before being called to active duty as a First Lieutenant in the United States Army Reserves in Iraq. Kevin recommended his father be appointed to the seat after his resignation in 2007. Local Democrats agreed to the request and appointed Tim Furey to serve as State Representative for the 91st district.

While a member of the Montana House of Representatives, Furey serves on the following committees: Agriculture, Business & Labor and Human Services. In 2011, he voted against the bill that repealed Initiative 148, reinstating criminal penalties for use of medical marijuana that Montana voters had repealed by a 62%-38% margin in 2004.
