= Deflazacort =

Pharmaceutical drug

Clinical data
- Trade names: Emflaza, Calcort, others
- AHFS/Drugs.com: Monograph
- Routes of administration: By mouth
- ATC code: H02AB13 (WHO)

Legal status
- Legal status: UK: POM (Prescription only); US: ℞-only

Pharmacokinetic data
- Protein binding: 40%
- Metabolism: By plasma esterases, to active metabolite
- Elimination half-life: 1.1–1.9 hours (metabolite)
- Excretion: Kidney (70%) and fecal (30%)

Identifiers
- IUPAC name: (11β,16β)-21-(Acetyloxy)-11-hydroxy-2′-methyl-5′H-pregna-1,4-dieno[17,16-d]oxazole-3,20-dione
- CAS Number: 14484-47-0
- PubChem CID: 189821
- DrugBank: DB11921
- ChemSpider: 164861
- UNII: KR5YZ6AE4B
- KEGG: D03671
- ChEMBL: ChEMBL1201891
- CompTox Dashboard (EPA): DTXSID9020378
- ECHA InfoCard: 100.034.969

Chemical and physical data
- Formula: C_{25}H_{31}NO_{6}
- Molar mass: 441.524 g·mol^{−1}
- 3D model (JSmol): Interactive image
- SMILES: O=C(OCC(=O)[C@]25/N=C(\O[C@@H]5C[C@H]1[C@H]4[C@H]([C@@H](O)C[C@@]12C)[C@]/3(/C=C\C(=O)\C=C\3CC4)C)C)C
- InChI: InChI=1S/C25H31NO6/c1-13-26-25(20(30)12-31-14(2)27)21(32-13)10-18-17-6-5-15-9-16(28)7-8-23(15,3)22(17)19(29)11-24(18,25)4/h7-9,17-19,21-22,29H,5-6,10-12H2,1-4H3/t17-,18-,19-,21+,22+,23-,24-,25+/m0/s1; Key:FBHSPRKOSMHSIF-GRMWVWQJSA-N

Deflazacort, sold under the brand name Calcort among others, is a glucocorticoid belonging to acetonides or O-isopropylidene derivative. It is used as an anti-inflammatory and was patented in 1969 and approved for medical use in 1985. The US Food and Drug Administration considers it to be a first-in-class medication for Duchenne Muscular Dystrophy.

== Medical uses ==
The manufacturer lists the following uses for deflazacort:

- Acute interstitial nephritis
- Anaphylaxis
- Asthma
- Autoimmune haemolytic anaemia
- Bullous pemphigoid
- Mixed connective tissue disease (other than systemic sclerosis)
- Crohn's disease
- Dermatomyositis
- Idiopathic thrombocytopenic purpura
- Juvenile chronic arthritis
- Severe hypersensitivity reactions
- Immunosuppression in transplantation
- Acute and lymphatic leukaemia
- Malignant lymphoma
- Multiple myeloma
- Muscular dystrophy
- Rheumatoid arthritis
- Polymyalgia rheumatica
- Nephrotic syndrome
- Pemphigus
- Polyarteritis nodosa
- Pyoderma gangrenosum
- Sarcoidosis
- Systemic lupus erythematosus
- Ulcerative colitis

In the United States, deflazacort is approved for the treatment of duchenne muscular dystrophy in people over the age of two.

== Adverse effects ==
Deflazacort carries the risks common to all corticosteroids, including immune suppression, decreased bone density, steroid induced muscle atrophy, myopathy and endocrine insufficiency. In clinical trials, the most common side effects (>10% above placebo) were Cushing's-like appearance, weight gain, and increased appetite.

== Pharmacology ==
=== Mechanism of action ===
Deflazacort is an inactive prodrug which is metabolized rapidly to the active drug 21-desacetyldeflazacort.

=== Relative potency ===
Deflazacort's potency is around 70–90% that of prednisone. A 2017 review found its activity of 7.5 mg of deflazacort is approximately equivalent to 25 mg cortisone, 20 mg hydrocortisone, 5 mg of prednisolone or prednisone, 4 mg of methylprednisolone or triamcinolone, or 0.75 mg of betamethasone or dexamethasone. The review noted that the drug has a high therapeutic index, being used at initial oral doses ranging from 6 to 90 mg, and probably requires a 50% higher dose to induce the same demineralizing effect as prednisolone. Thus it has "a smaller impact on calcium metabolism than any other synthetic corticosteroid, and therefore shows a lower risk of growth rate retardation in children and of osteoporosis" in the elderly, and comparatively small effects on carbohydrate metabolism, sodium retention, and hypokalemia.

== History ==
Deflazacort was first introduced in 1969 to treat rheumatoid arthritis, nephritic syndrome, SLE, transplantation, polymyalgia rheumatica, sarcoidosis and juvenile chronic arthritis.

In January 2015, the US Food and Drug Administration (FDA) granted fast track status to Marathon Pharmaceuticals to pursue approval of deflazacort as a potential treatment for Duchenne muscular dystrophy, a rare, "progressive and fatal disease" that affects boys. Although deflazacort was approved by the FDA for use in treatment of Duchenne muscular dystrophy on February 9, 2017, Marathon CEO announced on February 13, 2017, that the launch of deflazacort (Emflaza) would be delayed amidst controversy over the steep price Marathon was asking for the drug in the United States - $89,000 per year, which is "roughly 70 times" more than it would cost overseas.

== Society and culture ==
=== Legal status ===
The US Food and Drug Administration approved deflazacort to treat people aged five years of age and older with Duchenne muscular dystrophy, a rare genetic disorder that causes progressive muscle deterioration and weakness. Emflaza is a corticosteroid that works by decreasing inflammation and reducing the activity of the immune system. NDA 208684 was approved in February 2017, as a Type 1- new molecular entity with orphan status.

=== Economics ===
Deflazacort is available as an inexpensive generic. For example, in Canada, deflazacort can be purchased for around $1 per tablet.

=== Brand names ===
Deflazacort is sold in the United States under the brand name Emflaza after PTC Therapeutics, Inc. acquired all rights to Emflaza in March 2017. Deflazacort is sold in the United Kingdom under the trade name Calcort; in Brazil as Cortax, Decortil, Defcort and Deflanil; in India as Moaid, Zenflav, Defolet, DFZ, Decotaz, and DefZot; in Bangladesh as Xalcort; in Panama as Zamen; Spain as Zamene; and in Honduras as Flezacor.
