= Vincent Persico =

American politician

Member of the Illinois House of Representatives from the 39th district
- In office January 1991 – January 2002
- Preceded by: Ralph H. Barger
- Succeeded by: Roger Marquardt

Personal details
- Born: December 9, 1948 Oak Park, Illinois
- Died: July 22, 2016 (aged 67) Glen Ellyn, Illinois
- Party: Republican
- Spouse: Donna
- Children: One son
- Education: University of Illinois (B.S.); Northern Illinois University (M.Ed.)
- Profession: Teacher; Lobbyist

Vincent A. Persico (December 9, 1948 – July 22, 2016) was an American politician who served as a Republican member of the Illinois House of Representatives from 1991 to 2002.

== Early life, education and teaching career ==
He was born in Oak Park, Illinois and raised in the western suburbs of Chicago. He graduated from University of Illinois at Urbana–Champaign with a bachelor's in history and education. He became a teacher, first at Main Street Elementary School, then at Hadley Junior High School. In 1986, he earned his masters of education from Northern Illinois University.

== Political career ==
Also in 1986, Persico challenged incumbent Ralph H. Barger in the Republican primary to represent the 39th district in the Illinois General Assembly. He was unsuccessful. He ran for office three more times; first an unsuccessful rematch against Barger; a successful run for Milton Township Trustee; and a successful run two more attempts, defeating Barger in the 1990 Republican primary, which was tantamount to election. He continued to teach while a member of the Illinois House of Representatives.

In his first term, he was a member of the following committees; Education Appropriations; Educational Finance (vice spokesman); Elementary and Secondary Education; Energy and Environment; and Transportation and Motor Vehicles. He was Vice Spokesman for the Education Finance committee. During his tenure, he was active in deregulation and brownfield remediation issues. He was the leader of the successful movement to deregulate electric utilities in Illinois. He was the author of the rewritten Telecommunications Act, which deregulated telecommunications.

== Resignation and lobbying ==
After announcing his intention not to run for reelection in the 2002 general election, Persico resigned early in order to become a lobbyist. His clients included DuPage County government and the Illinois Society of Eye Physicians. A panel, led by Pate Philip chose Roger Marquardt, executive director of the DuPage Airport, to complete the remainder of his term.
