= Air Classics Museum of Aviation =

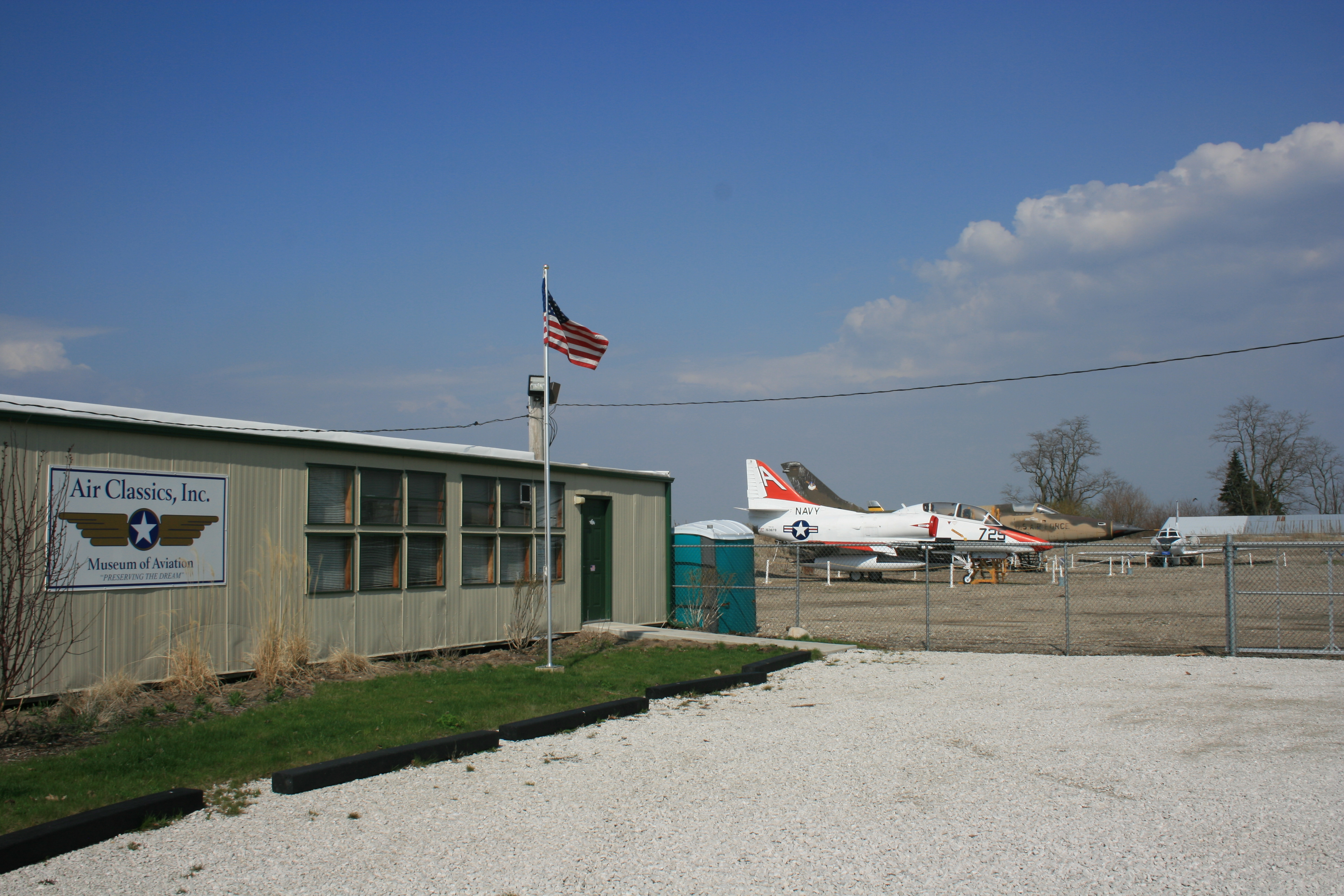

- Location within Illinois
- Established: 1990
- Location: Sugar Grove, Illinois
- Coordinates: 41.7643°N 88.4838°W
- Type: Aviation museum
- Founders: Rod Kath; Robert Knoll; Irvin Lewandowski; Larry Matt; Jack Rodgers
- Website: Archived 10 February 2025 at the Wayback Machine

The Air Classics Museum of Aviation is an aviation museum located at the Aurora Municipal Airport in Sugar Grove, Illinois.

== History ==
=== Establishment ===
The museum was founded by Rod Kath, Larry Matt, Irvin Lewandowski, Jack Rodgers, Robert Knoll in 1990 after they met at The Landings Airport in Huntley, Illinois. It opened with 17 aircraft three years later at the DuPage Airport in West Chicago, Illinois and began fundraising for a purpose built 100,000-square-foot (9,300 m^{2}) facility across the airport. However, within two years Knoll, Lewandowski and Rodgers had died. Their deaths resulted in a significant drop in funding and in another two years the museum was being asked to leave the airport. Shortly before moving, it completed the restoration of a F4F-3 for a display at O'Hare International Airport.

=== Move to Aurora ===
It moved to the Aurora Municipal Airport in Sugar Grove, Illinois within a year. Not long thereafter, in 1999, the museum announced a partnership with the Bannockburn Corporation to create the Ageless Classics Transportation Museum to display the latter's collection of classic cars.

== Exhibits ==
Exhibits at the museum include a display about women in aviation.

== Collection ==
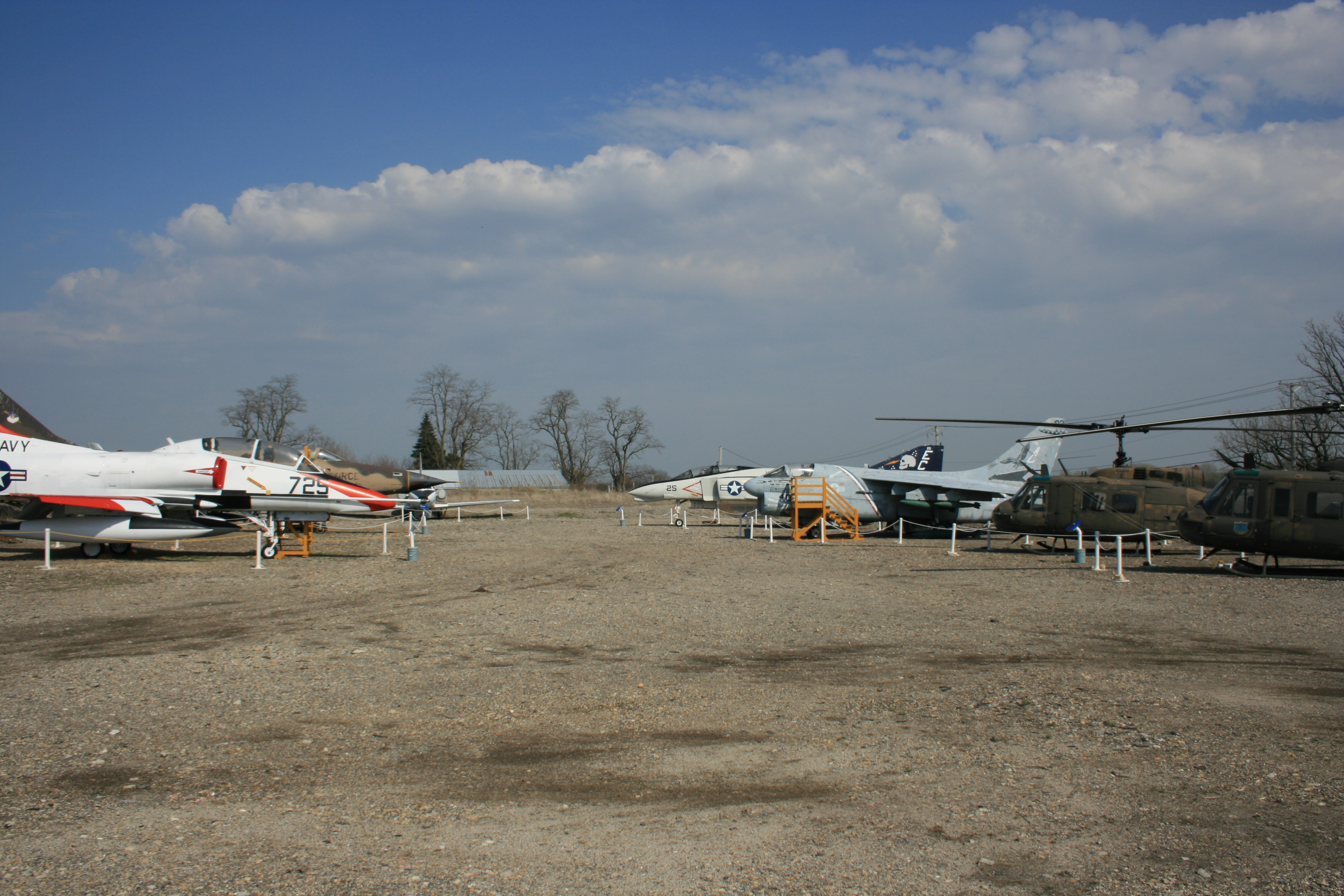
Aircraft at the museum

- Bell UH-1H Iroquois
- Curtiss P-40 Warhawk – replica
- McDonnell F-4B Phantom II
- McDonnell Douglas TA-4J Skyhawk
- LTV A-7E Corsair II
- Messerschmitt Bf 109 – replica
- North American P-51D Mustang – replica
- North American RF-86F Sabre
- North American T-39 Sabreliner
- Republic F-105D Thunderchief
- Republic P-47D Thunderbolt – replica

== Events ==
The museum holds an annual open house.
