= Tennessee Department of Education =

Education branch of the government of Tennessee, United States

Agency overview
- Jurisdiction: Tennessee
- Headquarters: 710 James Robertson Parkway, Nashville, TN 37243; 36.168000487139324°N 86.787147013493°W
- Agency executive: Lizzette Reynolds, Commissioner
- Website: www.tn.gov/education/

The Tennessee Department of Education (TDOE) is the state education agency of Tennessee. It is headquartered on the 9th floor of the Andrew Johnson Tower in Nashville. Lizzette Gonzales Reynolds is the current Commissioner of Education. She has held that position since June 29, 2023. Her predecessor was Dr. Penny Schwinn, who was sworn in on February 1, 2019. Prior to Dr. Schwinn, Candice McQueen held the position.

== List of commissioners ==
1. P.L. Harned 1923-1832
2. Walter D. Cocking 1932-1936
3. J.M. Smith 1937-1938
4. B.O. Duggan 1939-1943
5. Burgin E. Dossett 1943-1948
6. J.M. Smith 1949-1950
7. James A. Barksdale 1951-1952
8. Quill E. Cope 1953-1959
9. Joe Morgan 1959-1963
10. John Howard Warf 1963-1970
11. E.C. Stimbert 1971-1972
12. Benjamin E. Carmichael 1972-1974
13. Sam H. Ingram 1975-1978
14. Edward A. Cox 1978-1980
15. Robert L. McElrath 1980-87
16. Charles E. Smith 1987-1993
17. Wayne Qualls 1994-1995
18. Jane Walters 1995-1999
19. E. Vernon Coffey 1999-2001
20. Faye P. Taylor 2001-2003
21. Lana C. Seivers 2003-2008
22. Kevin S. Huffman 2011-2015
23. Candice McQueen 2015-2019
24. Penny Schwinn 2019-2023
25. Lizzette Reynolds 2023-
