= Lizzette Reynolds =

American education commissioner

25th Commissioner of the Tennessee Department of Education
- Incumbent
- Assumed office July 1, 2023
- Governor: Bill Lee
- Preceded by: Penny Schwinn

Personal details
- Born: Lizzette Gonzalez c. 1965
- Education: Southwestern University

Lizzette Gonzalez Reynolds (born c. 1965) is an American education commissioner. She has served as Statewide Policy and Programs Deputy Commissioner for the Texas Education Agency. She currently serves as the Tennessee Commissioner of Education. She came to public attention in November 2007 over the controversial firing of Christine Comer.

== Career ==
Lizzette Reynolds was educated at Southwestern University (1983-7) and holds a degree in political science. She worked for a state senator and as a lobbyist before serving as deputy legislative director during George W Bush’s 1994-2000 tenure as Governor of Texas. She was the Secretary's Regional Representative, U.S. Department of Education, Region VI. While in this role she was invited to the Board of Visitors of Southwestern University, She joined the Texas Education Agency (the state education agency) in January, 2007, as the Acting Deputy Commissioner for Statewide Policy and Programs. She was given management responsibility in September 2007 for the Curriculum Division.

On July 1, 2023, Reynolds became the education commissioner for the state of Tennessee, after Penny Schwinn's resignation.

== Comer controversy ==
In October 2007, Eugenie Scott, the executive director of the National Center for Science Education, sent an email to a list of addressees including Christine Comer, then Director of Science in the curriculum division of the Texas Education Agency. It announced a talk in Austin by one of the Center's directors, Barbara Forrest. Forrest was a key expert witness for the plaintiffs in the 2005 Kitzmiller v. Dover Area School District trial, who argued successfully that the concept of Intelligent Design is not scientific, but is a trojan horse for religious teaching in public schools. Comer received the email on October 26, 2007, and forwarded it to some acquaintances, adding only the text "FYI".

Reynolds received a copy of the email and forwarded it to Comer's bosses less than two hours after Comer sent it. Reynolds cover text is quoted in part: "This is highly inappropriate. I believe this is an offense that calls for termination or, at the very least, reassignment of responsibilities. This is something that the State Board, the Governor's Office and members of the Legislature would be extremely upset to see because it assumes this is a subject that the agency supports." Comer was subsequently asked to resign her employment.
