= Texas Citizens for Science =

- Company type: non-profit, educational science advocacy
- Industry: Education
- Founded: 2003
- Headquarters: Midland, Texas
- Key people: Steven Schafersman, President
- Website: www.txscience.org (Defunct)

Texas Citizens for Science (TCS) is a Texas-based advocacy group that works to protect the accuracy and reliability of science education in Texas. Its main activity is to oppose organized creationism in Texas, especially at the Texas State Board of Education, Texas Education Agency, Texas Legislature, and Texas Higher Education Coordinating Board.

TCS was formed in January 2003 as the successor to the Texas Council for Science Education that was active during 1980–1994.

Steven Schafersman, the president of the organization, is a geologist and former university professor.

In 2003, TCS was involved in opposing the introduction of creationism in hearings conducted by the Texas State Board of Education on biology textbooks. Schafersman testified before the board.

In 2007–2008, TCS provided information to the public about the forced resignation of Christine Comer from the Texas Education Agency and the attempt of the Institute for Creation Research to win Texas certification to offer master's degrees in science education.
