= Politics and the Life Sciences =

- Language: English
- Edited by: Gregg R. Murray

Publication details
- History: 1982-present
- Publisher: Cambridge University Press
- Frequency: biannual

Standard abbreviations
- ISO 4: Politics Life Sci.

Indexing
- ISSN: 0730-9384 (print); 1471-5457 (web)
- LCCN: 2001227164
- JSTOR: 07309384
- OCLC no.: 46368130

Links
- Journal homepage

Politics and the Life Sciences (PLS) is a peer-reviewed academic journal that was first published in 1982 with Thomas Wiegele as the editor. It is published by Cambridge University Press on behalf of the Association for Politics and the Life Sciences. Broadly speaking, PLS seeks to promote and disseminate peer-reviewed research on the relationship between biological mechanisms, broadly construed, and political behavior and institutions. It publishes rigorously conducted empirical research, both quantitative and qualitative, that tests clearly articulated theoretical assertions and rigorously argued theoretical essays that are intended to stimulate further scientific research. The journal welcomes the submission of full-length research articles and short research notes, meta-analyses, replications, introductions to new research tools, theoretical essays, and letters.

== Editors ==
- 1981-1991 : Thomas C. Wiegele, Northern Illinois University
- 1991-2001 : Gary R. Johnson, Lake Superior State University
- 2001-2008 : Robert Hunt Sprinkle, University of Maryland
- 2008–2016 : Erik P. Bucy, Indiana University
- 2017–2020 : Margaret E. Kosal, Georgia Institute of Technology, and Tony E. Wohlers, Cameron University
- 2020–present : Gregg R. Murray, Augusta University

== Indexing and archiving ==
The journal is indexed by International Political Science Abstracts and partially indexed in MEDLINE.

In January 2007 the journal was added to BioOne as part of its second collection BioOne.2, and in October 2008 it was added to JSTOR with a 3-year moving wall.
