= Kevin Furey =

American politician

Member of the Montana House of Representatives from the 91st district
- In office 2004 - 2007

Personal details
- Born: January 24, 1983 (age 43) Barrington, Illinois
- Party: Democratic Party
- Education: University of Montana
- Profession: Energy Development Officer

Kevin Timothy Furey was a Democratic Party member of the Montana House of Representatives, he represented District 91 from 2004 to 2007. Kevin resigned his seat in October 2007.
