= Ovation Pharmaceuticals =

American pharmaceutical manufacturer

Ovation Pharmaceuticals is an American manufacturer and distributor of pharmaceuticals products. It was founded in 2000 by Jeffrey Aronin and is headquartered in Deerfield, Illinois. A major office is also located near Lebanon, New Jersey. Ovation is a privately held corporation based on a business model of acquiring mature but under-promoted pharmaceuticals, as well as pharmaceutical candidates which are far along the development and FDA certification processes. Since 2009, the company has been wholly owned by the Danish pharmaceutical company Lundbeck.

In 2007, Ovation Pharmaceuticals was a recipient of the 2007 Chicago Innovation Awards.

== Products ==
The company particularly focuses on niche drugs for small patient populations. Products include the ADHD medicine, Desoxyn (brand name for methamphetamine hydrochloride), and vigabatrin, an anticonvulsant that inhibits the catabolism of GABA and is indicated for epilepsy and substance abuse.

== Purchases ==
In 2003, Sanofi sold its interests in stanozolol, Methylphenobarbital, and Dimercaptosuccinic acid to Ovation.

In March 2009, Lundbeck purchased Ovation for $600 million in cash, with further payments of up to $300 million based on regulatory approvals for vigabatrin (Sabril), which was under development at the time.

== Controversy ==
In 2008, the Federal Trade Commission sued Ovation in Minnesota federal district court over its 2006 acquisition of NeoProfen, a treatment for a congenital heart defect in newborns known as patent ductus arteriosus. Ovation already owned Indocin IV, the only other drug used for this condition. Upon acquiring the only competitor for Indocin IV, Ovation raised the price of both drugs by 1,300 percent, from $36 per vial to nearly $500 per vial. The dramatic price increase was the subject of a 2008 Congressional hearing. In 2010, a district court judge ruled that the FTC had not proved its case.
