= National Institute for Excellence in Teaching =

The National Institute for Excellence in Teaching (NIET) is an American nonprofit organization focused on K–12 education. It aims to improve teacher effectiveness and student achievement across the United States. Founded in 2005, NIET's main initiative is the TAP System for Teacher and Student Advancement (TAP System), a multi-measure school reform model.

== History ==
The concept for NIET began in the late 1990s when Lowell Milken, Chairman of the Milken Family Foundation, began exploring strategies to improve teacher quality, leading to the creation of the TAP System in 1999. As the system was implemented in various schools, the National Institute for Excellence in Teaching was established in 2005 as an independent 501(c)(3) nonprofit organization to oversee its expansion and research.

== TAP System ==
The TAP System incorporates four main components:

- Multiple Career Paths: Provides opportunities for teachers to take on leadership roles, such as mentor or master teacher, while continuing to teach.
- Ongoing Applied Professional Growth: Involves weekly, job-embedded professional development and coaching aligned with student needs.
- Instructionally Focused Accountability: Utilizes multiple evaluations per year by certified evaluators, focusing on feedback using research-based, well-defined instructional standards.
- Performance-Based Compensation: Allows teachers to earn additional pay based on multiple measures, including classroom observations and student achievement growth.

NIET supports the implementation of the TAP system, sometimes adapting its elements to fit specific state and local contexts.

== Development and expansion ==
In the late 2000s, NIET was awarded federal grants through the Teacher Incentive Fund (TIF) to help high-need schools implement performance-based teacher support systems. By 2020, NIET had worked with schools in several states, including Louisiana, Texas, Indiana, South Carolina, and Tennessee. NIET also collaborates with universities to incorporate its principles into teacher preparation programs. TAP’s implementation models vary to meet state and local contexts. Some districts fully adopt TAP’s four elements, while others customize implementation to meet their specific needs.

In 2024, ASCD published Unleashing Teacher Leadership: A Toolkit for Ensuring Effective Instruction in Every Classroom authored by Dr. Joshua Barnett. The book outlines strategies based on NIET's work with teacher leaders.

== Research and impact ==
Several independent studies have evaluated NIET's models:

- A 2023 National Bureau of Economic Research (NBER) working paper found positive long-term effects of TAP in South Carolina on student test scores, graduation rates, and reduced felony arrest rates and social welfare reliance, suggesting a cost-effective return on investment.
- Mathematica Policy Research found modest but statistically significant improvements in teacher retention and test scores in TAP schools.
- The American Institutes for Research (AIR) found that districts working with NIET through the Teacher Incentive Fund reported stronger teacher collaboration and improved instructional quality.

Some critics question the use of standardized test scores in performance-based pay systems. NIET states that TAP uses multiple measures, including both student growth and teacher evaluations based on instructional standards. Research on the program's long-term effectiveness continues.
