= Association for Politics and the Life Sciences =

The Association for Politics and the Life Sciences (APLS) was formed in 1981 and exists to study the field of biopolitics as a subfield of political science. APLS owns an academic peer-reviewed journal, Politics and the Life Sciences (PLS), which is published semi-annually by Cambridge University Press.
