= Steven Schafersman =

American paleontologist

- Born: Steven Dale Schafersman; November 4, 1948 (age 77); Dumas, Texas, United States
- Occupation: Geologist
- Website: www.BadGeology.com (Defunct)

Steven Dale Schafersman (born November 4, 1948) is an American geologist and current president of Texas Citizens for Science, an advocacy group that opposes teaching creationism as science in the public schools. He is also known for his blog BadGeology.com.

== Biography ==
Schafersman holds a B.S. in Geology and Biology from Northern Illinois University, a M.S. in Geology, and a Ph.D. in Geology (1983) from Rice University. He currently resides in Midland, Texas with his wife Dr. Gae Kovalick, at the University of Texas of the Permian Basin professor of Biology. He specialized in invertebrate paleontology, stratigraphy, and sedimentary petrology.

Schafersman grew up collecting fossils, mushrooms, insects, rocks, minerals, and playing outdoors in Texas, Arkansas, and Illinois.

Schafersman taught at the University of Texas of the Permian Basin (2000-2002), Miami University (Ohio) (1994-1999), University of Houston (1984-1989) and Houston Community College (1974-1978 and 1984-1994).

He has been a pro-science activist since 1989.

In addition, he created the Free Inquiry, a now-defunct website dedicated to educating the public on humanism and skepticism, and the Texas Citizens for Science website, committed to opposing the representation of religious concepts such as intelligent design and creationism as science in Texas textbooks. Schafersman contributes to a blog column for the Houston Chronicle at Evo.Sphere Blog.

== Texas State Board of Education ==
Schafersman works against the movement to revise the Texas State Board of Education science curriculum to include religious objections to evolution.
