= Jeff Aronin =

American businessman

- Born: December 8, 1967 (age 58)
- Education: Northern Illinois University
- Occupations: Chairman and CEO of Paragon Biosciences, LLC

Jeff Aronin (born December 8, 1967) is an American investor, entrepreneur, and biotechnology executive. He is founder, chairman and CEO of Paragon Biosciences, LLC, a global life science company that creates, builds, and funds innovative biology-based companies.

== Early life and education ==
Aronin discovered his passion for pharmaceutical development while shadowing a physician who was treating an epileptic pediatric patient with regular seizures. Confronted with limited options to stop the seizures other than to remove a portion of the young patient's brain, the doctor pursued an alternative treatment with a dosage of medication that successfully curbed the child's seizures, preventing the life-altering surgery and setting Aronin on his course to become an entrepreneur in the biopharmaceutical industry.

Aronin holds an M.B.A. from DePaul University and earned a B.S. from Northern Illinois University. He also lectures on entrepreneurship at the University of Chicago Booth School of Business and Northwestern University's Kellogg School of Management, where he completed post-graduate coursework. In 2010, he was named an Aspen Institute Henry Crown Fellow.

== Career ==
Aronin is the chairman of multiple Paragon portfolio companies including Harmony Biosciences (HRMY), Evozyne, Castle Creek Biosciences, Emalex Biosciences, and CiRC Biosciences, and previously Marathon Pharmaceuticals, a research based prescription biopharmaceutical company. Prior to Paragon, Aronin founded Ovation Pharmaceuticals LLC in 2000 and served as its chairman and CEO for nine years. On February 9, 2009, it was announced that H. Lundbeck A/S, a Danish pharmaceutical company, had purchased Ovation for $900 million. Chicago Mayor Rahm Emanuel appointed Aronin to the board of directors of World Business Chicago and co-chair of ChicagoNEXT. Aronin is also a former chair of MATTER, a start-up center in Chicago for next-generation healthcare technology companies that opened in February 2015. He previously served on the board of trustees of Discover Financial Services. He also served on the board of trustees of the Museum of Science and Industry.

In 2022 Aronin won a Gold Stevie Award and was named Entrepreneur of the Year – Pharmaceuticals. He also received a Titan Award for biology-based innovation.

== Philanthropy ==
Chicago Mayor Rahm Emanuel appointed Aronin to the board of directors of World Business Chicago (WBC), public-private partnership between the city and Chicago's business community to spur economic and job growth, and co-chair of ChicagoNEXT, WBC's council of technology leaders dedicated to driving opportunity in innovation and entrepreneurship in the region. Aronin is also chair of ChicagoNEXT's bioscience committee, where he spearheaded development of the health technology startup center MATTER. and previously served on the board of trustees of Chicago's Museum of Science and Industry. Aronin and his wife Lisa, thru the Aronin Family Foundation, support patient advocacy and research at organizations such as the American Porphyria Foundation, Huntington's Disease Society of America and the Pediatric Epilepsy Research Foundation. In November 2017 the Weizmann Institute of Science awarded Aronin the Weizmann Leadership Award.

== MATTER ==
Aronin is founder and former chairman of MATTER, an incubator community of healthcare innovators dedicated to improving patients' lives and solving complex problems confronting the healthcare industry launched in 2014. MATTER has supported more than 1,000 companies that have raised more than $5 billion to fuel their growth. Aronin was recognized in 2015 by the Chicagoland Entrepreneurial Center (CEC) for his leadership and contributions to establishing MATTER, awarding Aronin its Entrepreneurial Champion Award.
