= DuPage Airport =

Airport in West Chicago, Illinois, United States

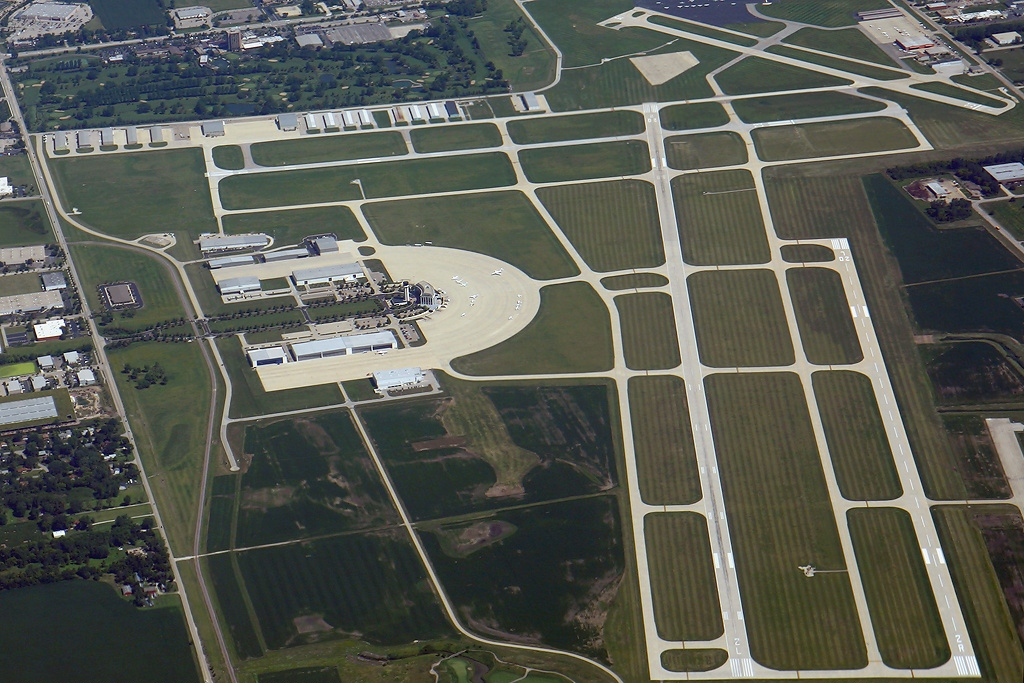
- IATA: DPA; ICAO: KDPA; FAA LID: DPA

Summary
- Airport type: Public
- Owner/Operator: DuPage Airport Authority
- Serves: Chicago metropolitan area
- Location: West Chicago, Illinois
- Opened: March 1943; 83 years ago
- Elevation AMSL: 759 ft (231 m)
- Coordinates: 41°54′25″N 88°14′54″W
- Website: www.dupageairport.com

Maps
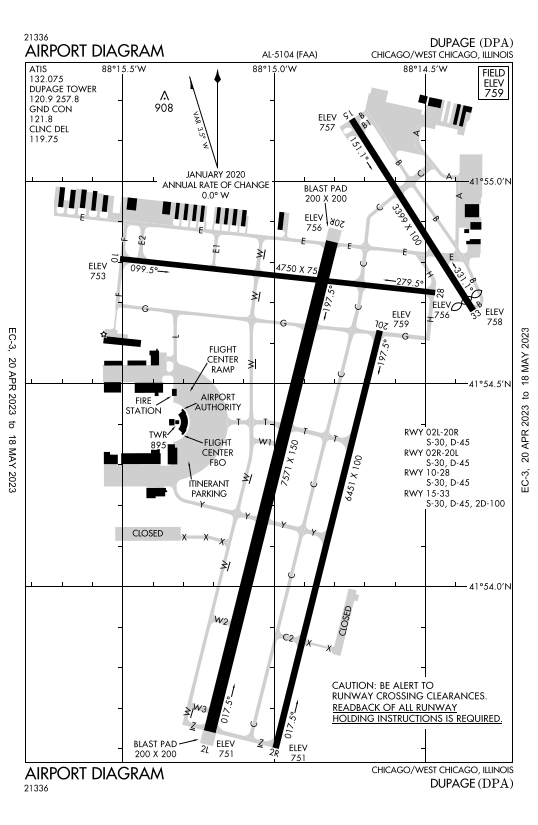
- FAA airport diagram

- Location of airport in Illinois DPA/KDPA/DPA (the United States)
- Interactive map of DuPage Airport

Runways
| Direction | Length | | Surface |
| Direction | ft | m | Surface |
|---|---|---|---|
| 2L/20R | 7,571 | 2,308 | Concrete |
| 2R/20L | 6,451 | 1,966 | Concrete |
| 10/28 | 4,750 | 1,448 | Asphalt |
| 15/33 | 3,399 | 1,036 | Asphalt |

Statistics (2022)
- Aircraft operations: 135,932
- Based aircraft: 236
- Source: FAA

DuPage Airport (IATA: DPA, ICAO: KDPA, FAA LID: DPA) is a general aviation airport located 29 miles (47 km) west of downtown Chicago in West Chicago, DuPage County, Illinois, United States. It is owned and operated by the DuPage Airport Authority, which is an independent government body established by law by the state of Illinois. It also serves as a relief airport for O'Hare International Airport and Midway International Airport, both in nearby Chicago.

== History ==
DuPage Airport is located on what used to be sheep-grazing land. In 1927, two Chicago entrepreneurs purchased the land and began barnstorming, using the field as a grass strip. In 1941, the U.S. Navy requisitioned DuPage Airport, built brick hangars, paved two runways in an “X” pattern and began training pilots for the war effort. The airport was officially activated in March 1943. Both the hangars and the original runway configuration still exist, though one runway is closed and is now taxiway C.

A year after the Navy began operations, Howard Aircraft Corporation opened a factory east of the airport across the road. The company built more than 500 trainer, transport and air ambulance aircraft for the military, and Howard employees were regularly seen pushing aircraft across the road to the little airport to test fly them.

In 1946, with the war over, the Navy sold the airport to DuPage County for $1. The post-war boom saw a lot of regional growth and the airport reflected it by adding an east-west runway and a five-story control tower and making plans for further expansion.

In the late 1970s, DuPage Airport was designated a reliever airport for general aviation aircraft, and in the early 1980s, the airport authority began an expansion project to accommodate the increased traffic.

However, planners learned a lesson from the plight of the beleaguered, land-locked Midway Airport. Surrounded by houses, restaurants and other small businesses, Midway found itself unable to expand and neighbors filed an endless succession of noise complaints. DuPage County would not make the same mistake.

The airport grew from 900 acres (360 ha) in 1985 to 2,800 acres (1,100 ha) by 1992, with the goal of maintaining control of all the property surrounding the runway complex. Much of the land was acquired to provide a large buffer zone around the airport.

The Air Classics Museum of Aviation was located at the airport from in the 1990s.

== Facilities and aircraft ==
DuPage Airport has four runways. The longest, and the reason for its status as a reliever airport, is runway 2L/20R, which is a Group IV-compliant concrete runway at 7,571 ft × 150 ft (2,308 m × 46 m). Its slightly smaller partner, 2R/20L, is another concrete runway with dimensions of 6,451 ft × 100 ft (1,966 m × 30 m). Two asphalt general aviation runways complete the arrangement: runway 10/28 at 4,750 ft × 75 ft (1,448 m × 23 m) and 15/33 at 3,399 ft × 100 ft (1,036 m × 30 m).

The DuPage Airport Authority owns 2,800 acres (1,100 ha) and operates four separate business units. This multifaceted business portfolio includes the DuPage Airport, one of the busiest airports in Illinois, its associated fixed-base operator (FBO), a Robert Trent Jones, Jr., designed golf course, and the largest corporate research and development park in DuPage County.

The airport has a Fixed-Base Operator offering fuel and aircraft parking, de-icing, catering, and lavatory services. Courtesy cars, a passenger terminal, lounges, snooze rooms, showers, and an exercise room are available for transient crews and passengers. There is also a flight school offering flight training, aircraft rental, aerial tours, pilot supplies, and aircraft maintenance and management. A cafe named for Kitty Hawk, North Carolina, the location of the Wright brothers' first flight, is also located at the airport.

DuPage Airport sits on 1,200 acres (490 ha), and is the only general aviation airport in Illinois with four active runways, two ILS approaches, a 24-hour FAA air traffic control tower, and over 40 aviation and non-aviation support businesses. DPA also has an on-site U.S. Customs Office. A total of 110 employees are associated with the airport.

For the 12-month period ending December 31, 2019, the airport had roughly 133,000 aircraft operations, an average of 364 per day: 95% general aviation, 4% air taxi, and <1% military. For the same time period, there were 255 aircraft based at this airport: 160 single-engine and 31 multi-engine airplanes, 60 jets, and 4 helicopters.

In September 2022, DuPage Airport opened a $1.3 million U.S. Customs and Border Protection (CBP) facility. The 2,200-sq-ft, user-fee CBP facility is conveniently located on the first floor of the DuPage Flight Center FBO.

DuPage Airport also serves as the headquarters for the Illinois Wing of the Civil Air Patrol.

== Reception ==
The airport faced severe political criticism in the 1980s and 1990s. A 1995 Chicago magazine exposé called it "A Monument to Lavish Spending of Taxpayers' Money, a Haven of GOP Patronage, and the Target of a Federal Probe."

According to an article by John K. Wilson:

"'Pate' Philip, the patron of DuPage airport, helped push forward a disastrously expensive enterprise which included land purchases making it four times the size of Midway Airport, a $10 million terminal, a $14 million golf course, and a charter airline run by the airport. The DuPage Airport budget grew from $1.6 million in 1984 to $46 million in 1993 at a time when airport use was declining. In 1992, DuPage Airport handled only 177,000 takeoffs and landings, while Aurora Municipal Airport took care of 134,000 takeoffs and landings at a cost of only $2 million."

According to a May 2006 article in Aviation International News:

"Before 2003, the airport had been on a trend of worsening annual operating losses. That trend was reversed in 2003 and the airport has continued to show improved operating results each quarter since. Last year the airport experienced a record-breaking year, with revenue up and expenditures down. The cornerstone of the airport's financial turnaround is the mission statement developed by the airport's Board of Commissioners in 2003. It establishes the framework for moving the airport toward operating as a self-sustaining facility while contributing to the economic impact of the county. The aggressive philosophy has resulted in two leases that will bring 60,000 sq ft (6,000 m^{2}) of new hangar space to the airport. The airport is also developing another 48,000 sq ft (4,500 m^{2}) of hangar space".

In the late 1990s, 800 acres (3.2 km^{2}) of land were set aside for a nonprofit technology park that had secured a $34 million grant from the state. After the DuPage National Technology Park's failure to attract significant business and a media investigation into its highly paid administrator, the board of the park voted for its dissolution in June 2010. The park's management was transferred to the DuPage Airport Authority Board, whose chairman criticized the political decision-making that had led to its failure. The park was then reorganized as the DuPage Business Center.

== Accidents and incidents ==
- On October 23, 1986, a Cessna 441 Conquest was involved in an accident at DuPage.
- On December 22, 1986, a Bellanca 14-19-3A was involved in an accident at DuPage.
- On April 15, 1989, a Cessna 152 crashed at DuPage due to the flight instructor's improper execution of S-turns on final to increase spacing and the full retraction of flaps when performing a go-around. The student pilot aboard was also found to have failed to maintain adequate airspeed during the S-turns. Contributing factors were inadequate ATC tower service and tower separation, improper supervision in the tower, and the student pilot's inexperience.
- On September 21, 1991, a Cessna 172 crashed at DuPage after a loss of engine power. The pilot did not properly execute a return to the airport and failed to maintain airspeed, resulting in an inadvertent stall at an altitude insufficient for recovery.
- On June 13, 1995, a Grumman G-21E impacted terrain after takeoff from DuPage. The aircraft entered a high nose up pitch, rolled left, and struck the ground in a dive. The private pilot and passenger were fatally injured. The probable cause of the crash was found to be the pilot's excessive nose-up rotation during liftoff and failure to maintain adequate airspeed, which resulted in an inadvertent stall.
- On December 30, 1997, a Mitsubishi MU-2B-30 crashed north of DuPage after departing from the airport on a training flight. Both pilots had commercial licenses. One pilot had reportedly said before takeoff that the two planned to work on engine failure scenarios, and the aircraft's trim settings were found to be set for a simulated right engine failure. The aircraft's flaps had been set to up but were stuck at 2 degrees in transit at the time of the crash.
- On May 9, 2001, a Cessna 172 Skyhawk was substantially damaged when the aircraft veered off the runway, striking a sign and collapsing the right main landing gear. The probable cause was found to be an inadequate compensation for the crosswind by the student pilot; contributing were the student pilot's lack of total flight time and the runway signs.
- On August 28, 2001, a Swearingen SA226-T Metroliner was damaged during a loss of direction control on takeoff at DuPage. The pilot failed to complete all the required checklists and did not maintain directional control.
- On January 28, 2003, an Agusta A109 impacted terrain north of DuPage Airport. The aircraft was operating as an on-demand air ambulance flight. The probable cause of the accident was found to be the pilot's failure to maintain control of the helicopter while maneuvering, resulting in excessive descent rate and impact terrain. Contributing factors include the dark night, low ceiling, and reduced visibility.
- On June 1, 2003, a Mooney M20 sustained substantial damage when it veered off the side of the runway and impacted signs and markings after a hard landing at DuPage. The pilot reported he flared too high, dropped to the runway, and bounced. The pilot attempted a go-around by adding power and retracting what he believed to be one notch of flaps, but the aircraft swerved left, and the pilot overcorrected and swerved off the runway. The aircraft's nosegear collapsed after the aircraft returned to a paved taxiway from the grass. The probable cause of the accident was found to be the pilot's improper flare and inability to maintain directional control. Contributing was the pilot's inadequate recovery from a bounced landing.
- On March 18, 2003, a Piper PA-34 Seneca sustained substantial damage during a hard landing at the airport. The pilot flew a faster-than-normal approach due to winds, but he flared too high and landed hard. The nose gear collapsed, and the nose gear support tube was pushed vertically up through the airframe by 6 inches. The center windshield airframe was pushed up, and the left and right windshields were separate from the cockpit's windshield frame. All three blade tips on both propellers were bent aft and exhibited gouging and scraping.
- On December 30, 2003, a Cessna 182 Skylane received substantial damage when a fire began in the engine compartment during an attempted start. The fire was extinguished by the local fire department. The instructor onboard stated the engine was over-primed, and while a flooded start procedure was used, the engine would not start. Smoke was seen from the cowling on the second start attempt. The probable cause of the incident was found to be the inadequate starting and flooded engine procedure used by the instructor onboard while providing instruction to the student.
- On May 1, 2007, a Cessna 172 Skyhawk impacted a ditch following an uncontrolled exit from the runway surface at DuPage. The aircraft lifted off after initial touchdown, and power was increased as the aircraft yawed into the left crosswind. The aircraft exited the runway into the grass adjacent to the runway, and the left wingtip impacted the grass during rollout. The probable cause of the accident was found to be the instructor's inadequate remedial action following the student pilot's loss of control during a crosswind landing as well as the instructor's failure to compensate for the wind conditions. Contributing were the crosswind, gusting winds, and the ditch.
- On July 19, 2009, a Cessna 172 Skyhawk experienced a loss of throttle control during a practice instrument approach at DuPage. The flight landed without incident. The probable cause was found to be a partial loss of engine power due to the detachment of the throttle control from the throttle assembly; contributing to the incident was a lack of redundant means to preclude the detachment of the cable from the throttle assembly.
- On April 19, 2010, a Piper PA-24 Comanche experienced a runway excursion at DuPage during a training flight. The solo pilot on board was performing touch-and-goes when they lost control after touchdown. The aircraft corrected with aileron and rudder but neglected to use brakes. The aircraft continued off the paved runway and struck two runway lights and a taxiway sign. The pilot continued the aircraft across the grass and stopped on the adjacent paved taxiway, then taxied the aircraft to the ramp. The probable cause of the incident was found to be the pilot's failure to maintain directional control of the airplane during landing.
- On October 23, 2011, a Cessna 210 Centurion landed with its landing gear retracted. The pilot reported he had selected the down-neutral position instead of the full-down position. The pilot neglected to confirm whether the gear was in fact extended. No mechanical malfunctions or failures that would have prevented the landing gear from extending normally were found. The probable cause of the incident was found to be the pilot's failure to extend the landing gear before touchdown due to his failure to use a checklist.
- On November 26, 2011, a pilot crashed northwest of DuPage airport after attempting to land there in instrument meteorological conditions. The non-instrument-rated pilot lost sight of the airport and overflew it before leaving the area to try to land at another airport. The aircraft impacted terrain soon after. The pilot, his two daughters, and the boyfriend of one of the daughters were all killed in the crash.
- On April 11, 2014, a Piper PA-46 Mirage experienced a landing gear collapse following a loss of directional control while landing at DuPage. The commercial pilot and passenger on board were not injured, but the aircraft received substantial damage to the firewall and wings. The pilot reported the landing gear was reported as down and locked by the aircraft's indicators, but when the nosegear touched down, the aircraft pulled hard to the left. Though the pilot attempted to maintain control, the aircraft traveled into the grass off the runway, where the wing impacted an airport sign and the gear collapsed. The probable cause of the crash was found to be a failure of the nose gear actuator attachment to the engine mount due to overstress, resulting in the loss of directional control.
- On May 2, 2024, a Cessna 172 Skyhawk registered as N20095 was holding short of runaway 20R on taxiway E and waited for a storm with heavy precipitation to pass. A gust of wind lifted the right wing and pushed the airplane to the right side of the runway causing the aircraft to be completely overturned. The airplane came to rest upside down which resulted in substantial damage to the wing, vertical stabilizer, and rudder. The flight instructor reported he was holding appropriate flight control inputs for the wind at the time the accident occurred. The flight instructor later reported that there were no mechanical failures or malfunctions with the airplane that would have precluded normal operations. The probable cause of the crash was found to be the flight instructor's failure to maintain control of the airplane during an encounter with wind while holding short of the runaway. The two occupants in the aircraft survived.
- On December 17, 2025, at around 1:50PM CST a Piper PA-30 registered as N8693Y crashed shortly after takeoff from runaway 20R. The airplane crashed into the grass west of taxiway W between taxiway T and Y. The two occupants onboard sustained fatal injuries.

== See also ==
- List of airports in Illinois
- List of airports in the Chicago area
- West Chicago station
