= Hilltop Park =

Former baseball venue in New York City

- Hilltop Park
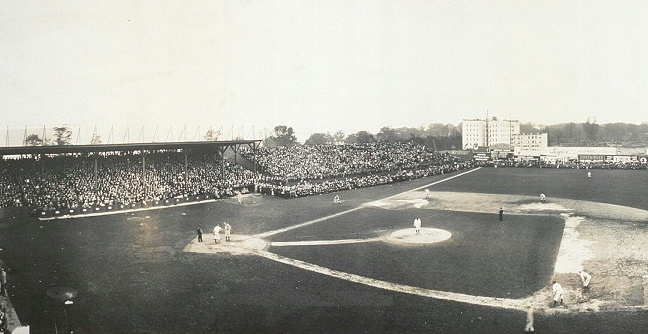
- Interactive map of Hilltop Park
- Former names: American League Park (official)
- Location: Broadway between 165th and 168th St; New York City
- Coordinates: 40°50′26″N 73°56′32″W
- Owner: Frank J. Farrell
- Capacity: 16,000 seated with 10,000 standing
- Surface: Grass
- Field size: Left Field – 365 ft (111 m); Left-Center – 378 ft (115 m); Center Field – 420 ft (128 m); Right-Center – 424 ft (129 m); Right Field – 385 ft (117 m); Backstop – 91 ft (27 m)

Construction
- Opened: April 30, 1903
- Closed: October 5, 1912
- Demolished: 1914
- Cost: US$200,000 ($7.17 million in 2025 dollars)

Tenants
- New York Highlanders (MLB) (1903–1912); Columbia Lions football (1904–1905); New York Giants (MLB) (1911)

Hilltop Park was a ballpark in the Washington Heights neighborhood of Manhattan in New York City. It was the home of the New York Yankees of Major League Baseball from 1903 to 1912 when they were known as the "Highlanders". It was also the temporary home of the New York Giants during a two-month period in 1911 while the Polo Grounds was being rebuilt after a fire.

The ballpark's formal name, as painted on its exterior walls, was American League Park. Because the park was located on top of a ridge of Manhattan Island, it was nicknamed Hilltop Park, and its team was most often called the New York Highlanders (as well as the Americans and the Yankees). This "Highland" connection contrasted with their intra-city rivals, the Giants, whose Polo Grounds was just a few blocks away, in the bottomland under Coogan's Bluff.

Hilltop Park sat on the block bounded by Broadway, 165th Street, Fort Washington Avenue, and 168th Street. The structure consisted of a covered grandstand stretching from first base to third base and uncovered bleacher sections down the right and left field lines. Originally built in just six weeks, the park sat 16,000, with standing room for an additional 10,000 or so. The bleachers were covered in 1911, and also bleachers to seat an additional 5,000 fans were built in 1911 (partially to accommodate Giants fans, who were temporary tenants after the Polo Grounds fire) in center field.

The field was initially huge by modern standards — 365 ft (111 m) to left field, 542 ft (165 m) to center field and 400 ft (120 m) to right field. An inner fence was soon constructed to create more realistic action. Both the park and the nickname "Highlanders" were abandoned when the American Leaguers left, at the beginning of the 1913 season, to rent the Polo Grounds from the Giants. The Polo Grounds had a far larger seating capacity, and by that time was made of concrete due to the 1911 fire. Hilltop Park was demolished in 1914.

== History ==
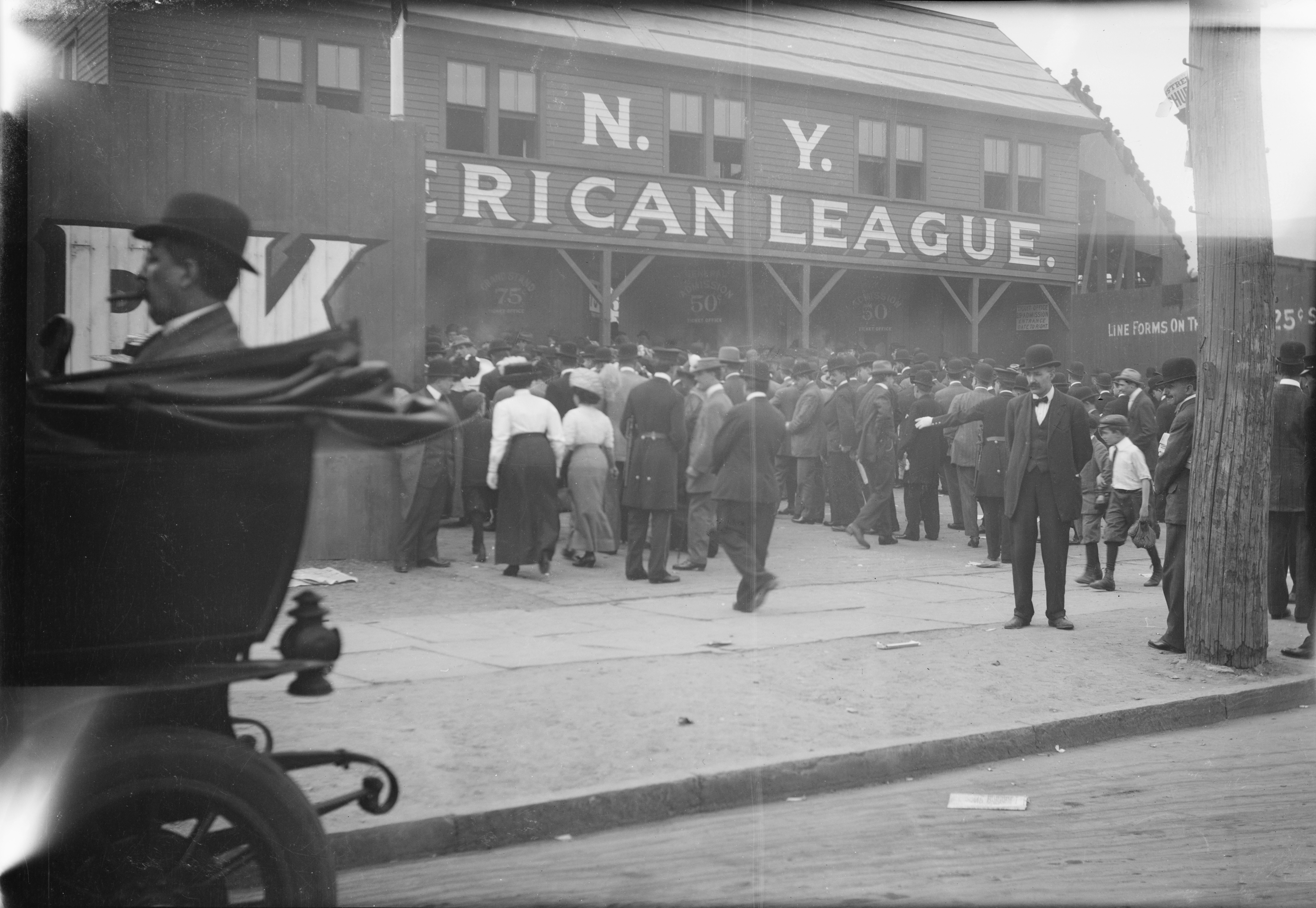
The entrance to Hilltop Park, 1912.

American League baseball came to New York City in 1903 when gambler Frank J. Farrell and former New York City Police Chief William S. Devery bought the Baltimore Orioles franchise for $18,000, equal to $645,000 today. They established the team at Hilltop Park, a hastily constructed wooden park seating about 16,000 fans, on the west side of Broadway between 165th and 168th streets. It was catty-corner to the New York School for the Deaf, which at that time was located at 99 Fort Washington. The land was acquired via a ten-year lease, arranged by the New York Institution for the Blind.

The block was effectively parkland, with many trees to be cut down and an artificial lake to be drained and filled in. In mid-April, the owners announced that the new ballpark was to be officially known as American League Park.

Between that fact and the club president Joseph Gordon being fancifully linked by sportswriters to the Gordon Highlanders, the team nickname "Highlanders" followed logically. Opening Day came on April 30, 1903, when the New York Highlanders played the Washington Senators.

The ballpark site was quite large for its time (9.6 acres (3.9 ha) or nearly double the size of many ballpark sites of that era), and the south portion of the land plot was used for the parking of first carriages and later automobiles. The shape of the land plot was a large trapezoid with right angles at the site's northeast and southeast corners. The left field foul line ran mostly North to South and was parallel to Fort Washington Road (the western boundary of the park). The left field foul line would, if extended about 20 additional feet, have intersected 168th Street at less than 90°. The right field foul line would, if extended, have intersected Broadway (the eastern boundary of the park) at more than 90°. The ballpark site was thus trapezoidal in shape and large for the Deadball Era.

Hilltop Park in 1908. MLB rules then allowed for standing-room-only fans to take up the foul lines and along the outfield fences.

The seating capacity of 16,000 was also rather large for this time period. Capacity in the dead-ball Era was a flexible concept. In accordance with the practices of the day, overflow crowds were allowed to stand in the perimeter of the outfield. In addition, for "big" games, additional standees were allowed down the foul lines and between home plate and the backstop. Thus the effective overall capacity of the park was closer to 25,000, although even when stuffed to the gills, it fell well short of the normal capacity of the Polo Grounds.

The original 1903 construction of Hilltop Park cost about $200,000, more than two-thirds of which was spent for rock blasting and excavations; and the groundskeeper of the Highlanders, Phil Schenck, laid out the playing field. The ballpark consisted of a covered grandstand of three sections, although it was not actually roofed until June 1 that season. Two sections of the grandstand were parallel to the foul lines and the third section was a short intermediate diagonal, which formed the backstop. The grandstand extended a short way past both first and third bases, and a clubhouse was located behind the center field fence. Single-deck bleachers that extended down both foul lines reached from the grandstand almost to the fences. The third base bleachers were not finished until June 1903. These first and third base bleachers angled towards the foul lines reducing the foul area at the fences to about 15 feet. A modest-sized scoreboard was in fair territory down the left field foul line. The main entrance to the park was on Broadway and a ramp led up to the top of the first base grandstand. Unlike many of the other contemporary wooden ballparks-this one never burned.

Hilltop Park was not in good condition when it opened. There was a swamp in right field that had yet to be filled with rock, the outfield had no grass, the grandstand had not been completed, and players had to dress at their hotel rooms because the clubhouse was not completed. When Hilltop Park was finally completed, a single-tier wooden covered grandstand extended from the third base dugout to homeplate, and around to the first base dugout. Uncovered grandstands extended to both foul poles. From behind homeplate, fans could see scenic views of the Hudson River and New Jersey Palisades.

The ball club continued work on the outfield. Prior to the 1904 season, it was reported, "the rather deep hollow at right field has been nearly obliterated, which will increase the playing space of that portion of the park many feet."

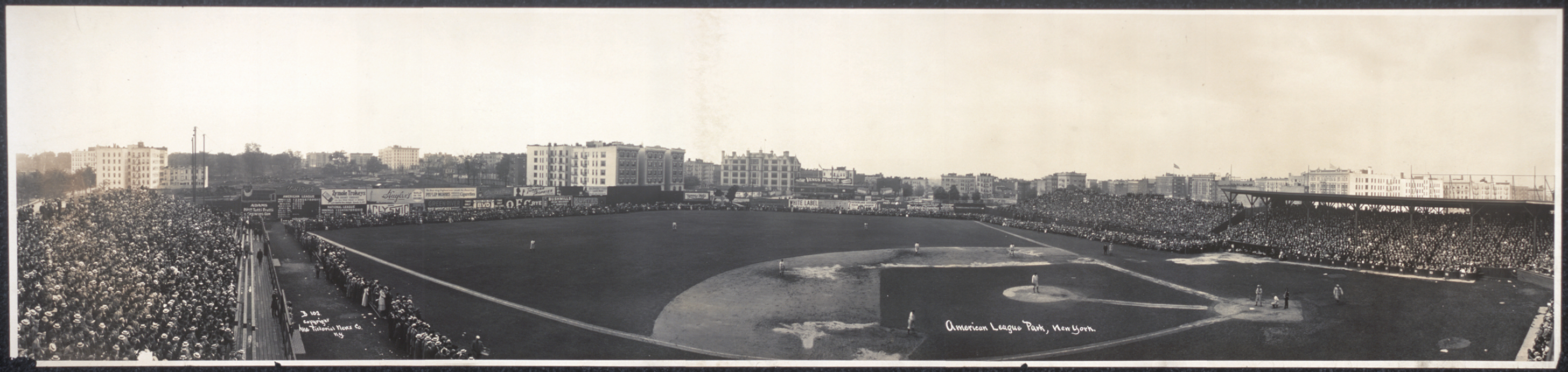
Hilltop Park, circa 1910. Products advertised on the fences include Green River Whiskey and Zymole Trokeys throat lozenges.

After the Polo Grounds burnt down in 1911, the Highlanders/Yankees offered to share their facility with the New York Giants, and the grateful National Leaguers took up temporary residence in Hilltop Park. The Highlanders added a bleacher section in deep center field, painted black to serve as a batter's eye screen. After two more seasons, the lease expired and the American Leaguers moved a few blocks east and south into the rebuilt Polo Grounds to sub-lease from the Giants. At that point the nickname Highlanders was dropped as the team was now strictly "the Yankees". The last big league game played at Hilltop Park was on October 5, 1912.

Although the Yankees were done at the Hilltop, other events were staged there in the fall of 1912, including high school football and Auto polo. The park was demolished in 1914.

== 1904 ==
The Highlanders / Yankees were not particularly successful during their stay at the Hilltop. There was no hint that the club would eventually become baseball's greatest dynasty. Their best season was 1904, when they were in a tight race with Boston all summer. The season ended on October 10, with the Hilltop hosting a doubleheader against Boston, who led by 1 1/2 games. A sweep by the home team would have won the league championship for New York. However, Boston won the first game by scoring a tie-breaking run in the top of the ninth inning. With a Boston runner on third, New York pitcher Jack Chesbro threw a spitball that got away and sailed over the catcher's head. The runner on third easily came across the plate with what proved to be the pennant-clinching run.[Boston Globe, October 11, 1904, p. 11] The Globe giddily called the game "The greatest victory ever won in outdoor sport."

Although the Highlanders failed to win the league title, their unexpected presence in the pennant race ultimately led to the stabilization of the modern World Series. The Giants were on their way to winning the National League flag, and they announced ahead of time that they had no intention of playing against their cross-town rivals in a post-season World Series. Although Boston prevailed in the American League race, the Giants stuck with their plan, and no Series was played. The resulting public outcry spurred the Giants' owner to organize a committee and establish rules for how future Series were to be conducted.

== Cy Young and Walter Johnson ==
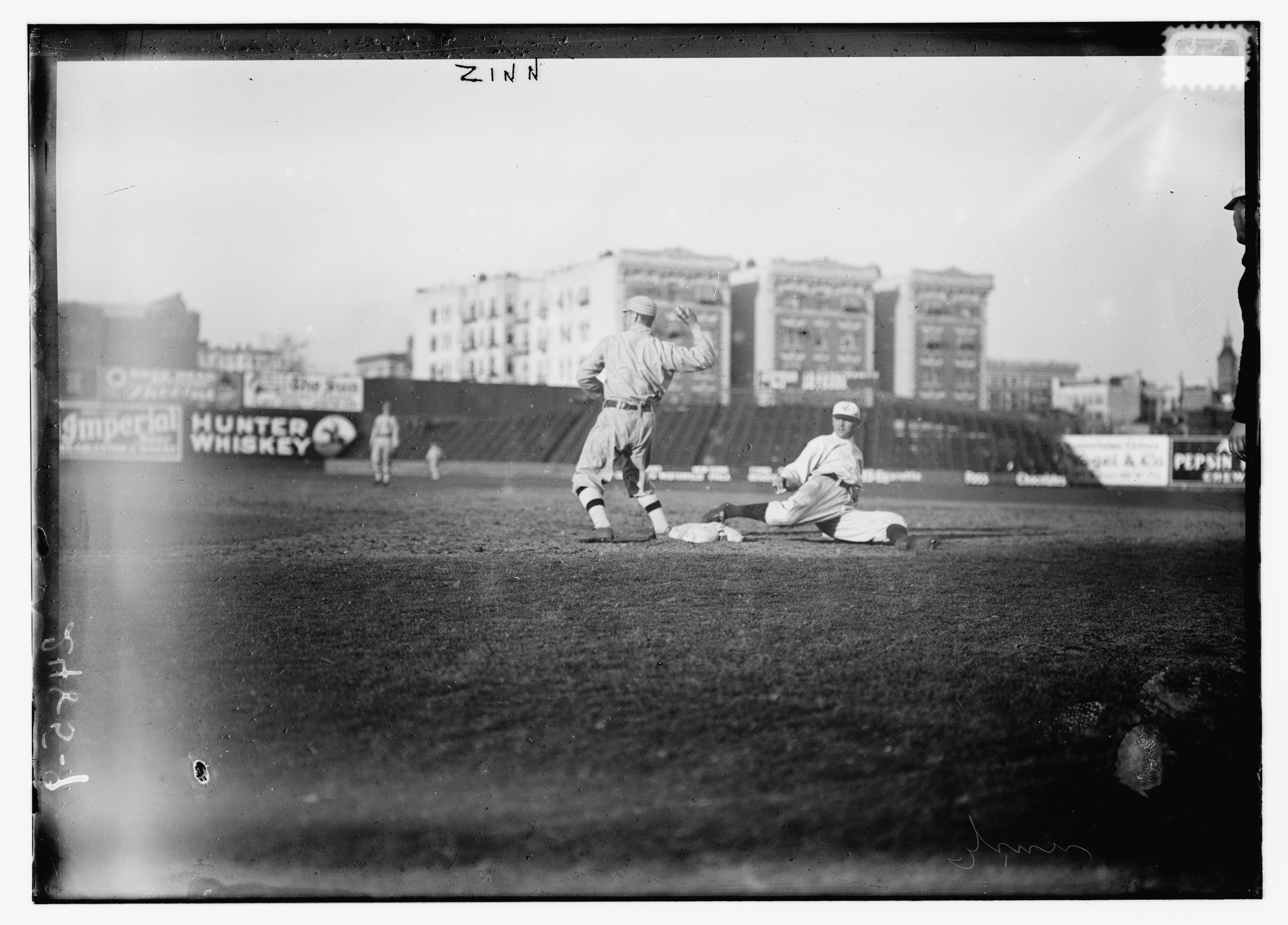
Hilltop Park in 1912. The three buildings above the bleachers still stand today on 168th Street and Broadway.

Two Hall of Fame pitchers had good outings at Hilltop Park in 1908.

- On June 30, 1908, Cy Young pitched a no-hitter against New York, winning handily 8-0. This was the third and final no-hitter in Young's illustrious career. The game coverage by The New York Times the following day, along with a summary of Young's career, is noteworthy in that the locals were referred to as the "New York Yankees" or "Yanks" throughout the article, demonstrating how common the nickname was by then, and with no reference at all to "Highlanders". The Times also consistently referred to the Hilltop by its formal name, "the American League Park". (The Complete Book of Baseball: A New York Times Scrapbook History, Arno Press, Bobbs-Merrill, 1980, p. 8)
- One of the more impressive pitching performances of all time took place at the Hilltop. On September 4, 1908, 20-year-old Walter Johnson of the Washington Senators/Nationals shut out the Highlanders 3-0 with a five-hitter. The next day, Johnson again blanked the Yankees, 6-0, on a three-hitter. The city's "blue law" prevented a game on Sunday. On Monday, September 7, Senators manager Joe Cantillon again gave Johnson the ball and he improved again, this time hurling a two-hit, 4-0 victory over the Hilltoppers, his third shutout in the space of four days.

== Ty Cobb ==
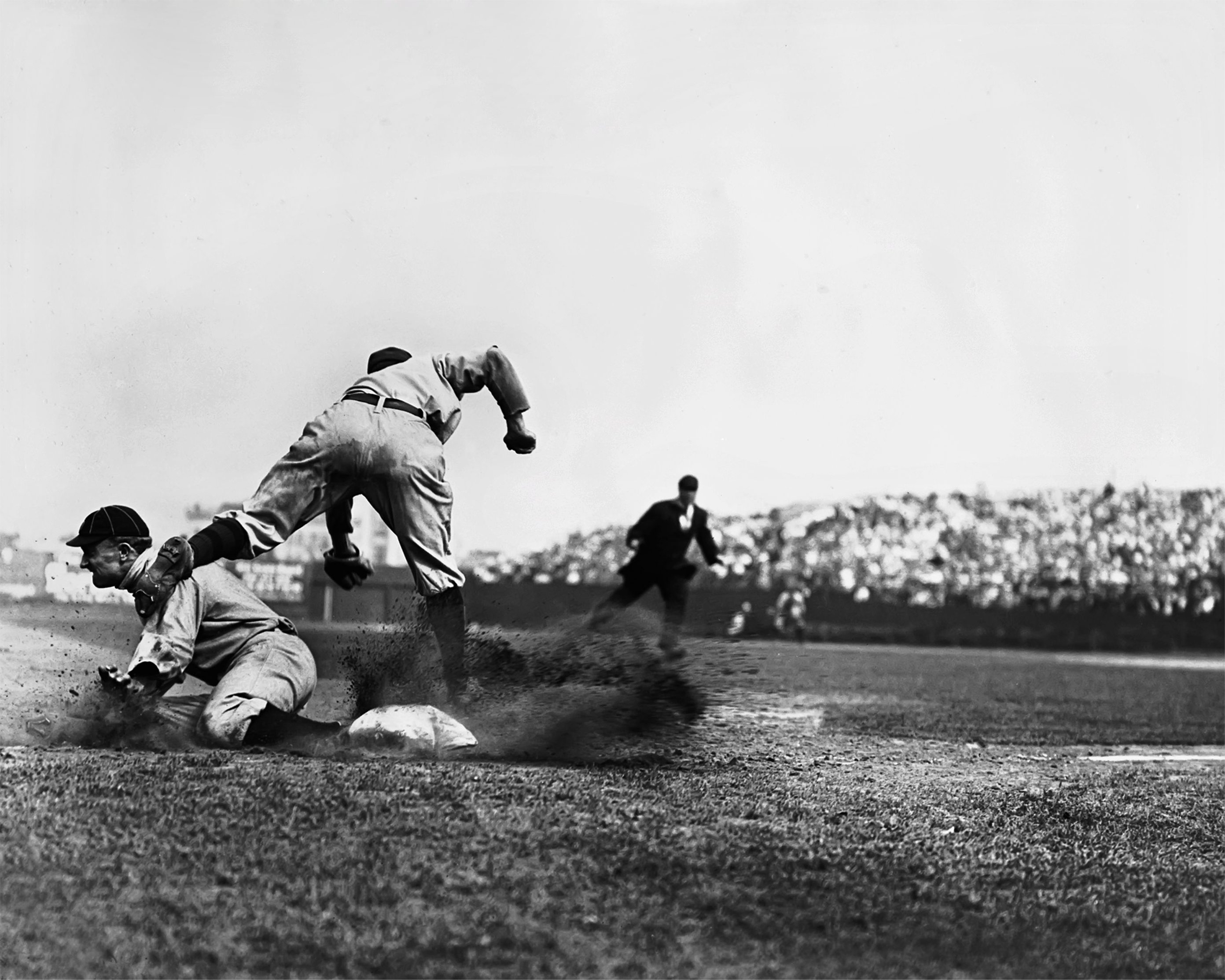
Cobb stealing third at Hilltop Park

Detroit outfielder Ty Cobb, "The Georgia Peach", made many a mark on the game of baseball, some famous and some infamous. At least one of each happened at the Hilltop:

- In a game "sometime in 1909" according to photographer Charles M. Conlon (the actual date has been determined as July 23, 1910 ), Conlon snapped a photo of Cobb sliding into third base, stealing the base and spilling Highlanders' third baseman Jimmy Austin. This photo became one of the most famous and widely circulated baseball photos ever.
- On May 15, 1912, after being heckled for several innings, Cobb leaped the fence and attacked his tormentor. He was suspended indefinitely by league president Ban Johnson, but his suspension was eventually reduced to 10 days and $50. The Tigers went on a one-game strike for the next game, at Philadelphia, but rather than forfeit, the Tigers owners filled the lineup with a makeshift group of ex-college players and whoever else could be found. Coincidentally, one of the substitutes, Billy Maharg, would become involved behind the scenes in the Black Sox Scandal seven years later.

== Site ==
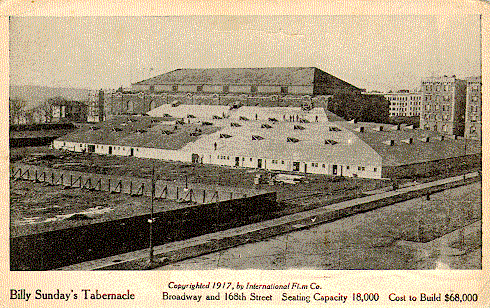
Billy Sunday tabernacle on the ballpark site, 1917

The block where Hilltop Park once stood was used as a temporary site for a Billy Sunday tabernacle in 1917. The site remained otherwise vacant until the land was purchased by Edward S. Harkness for the express purpose of building the world's first academic medical center. Columbia-Presbyterian Medical Center opened in 1928 and is now called NewYork-Presbyterian / Columbia University Irving Medical Center.

Some of the buildings visible in the background of ballpark photos still stand. They include a trio of six-story buildings at the northwest corner of Broadway and 168th (behind center field); and the Fort Washington Avenue Armory (behind left field), which was built in 1911. Those buildings also appear in pictures of the Billy Sunday tabernacle.

The site of the hearing-impaired institution to the southwest is now a parking lot for the Medical Center. Most of the other buildings visible in ballpark photos are gone, including the five-story Public School 169, behind right-center field.

On September 30, 1993 a plaque was placed on the hospital grounds to mark the former location of home plate in Hilltop Park. The plaque was donated to the hospital by the New York Yankees to commemorate the exact location of where home plate rested in Hilltop Park. The plaque is bronze and is the same size and shape as a regulation home plate. The text on the plaque reads,

"Dedicated to Columbia-Presbyterian Medical Center and the community of Washington Heights by the New York Yankees to mark the exact location of home plate in Hilltop Park, home of the New York Highlanders, from 1903 to 1912, later renamed the New York Yankees."

Preceded by Oriole Park	Home of the New York Highlanders; 1903 – 1912	Succeeded by Polo Grounds
Preceded by Polo Grounds	Home of the New York Giants; 1911	Succeeded by Polo Grounds
