= Frank Navin =

American businessman and baseball executive

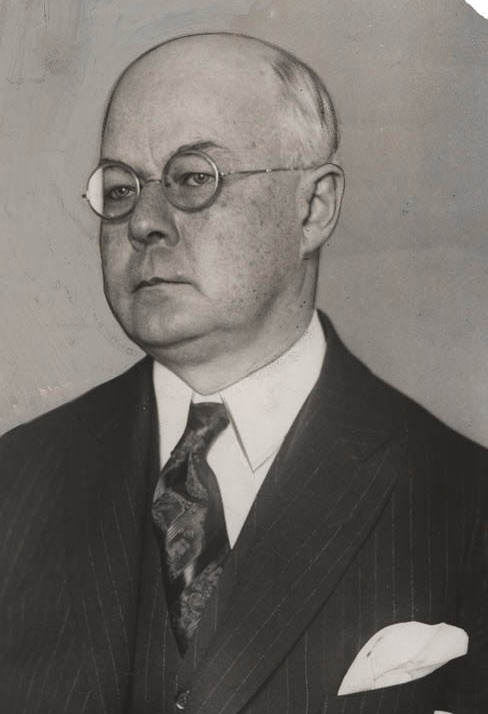
- Born: April 18, 1871; Adrian, Michigan, U.S.
- Died: November 13, 1935 (aged 64); Detroit, Michigan, U.S.
- Education: Detroit College of Law
- Occupation: Businessman

Francis Joseph Navin (April 18, 1871 – November 13, 1935) was an American businessman and baseball executive who was the president of the Detroit Tigers in Major League Baseball for 27 years, from 1908 to 1935. He was part-owner from 1908 to 1919, and principal owner from 1919 to 1935. He also served as vice president and, in 1927, as acting president of the American League.

== Early years (1902–1910) ==
Born in Adrian, Michigan, Navin was one of nine children of Irish immigrants. He attended the Detroit College of Law and worked as both a lawyer and accountant.

In 1902, Navin was a bookkeeper at the insurance offices of Samuel F. Angus when Angus led a syndicate that purchased the Detroit Tigers. Angus brought the 31-year-old Navin with him as the team's bookkeeper. He also served as "secretary, treasurer, business manager, farm director, chief ticket seller, advertising manager, and any other position that demanded immediate attention." In 1903, Navin bought $5000 in stock in the team, reportedly with money won in a card game.

Navin had an eye for talent, and he built a team that won three straight pennants from 1907 to 1909. His signing of Ty Cobb and Hughie Jennings was instrumental in the development of the Tigers championship teams. But Angus soon tired of the Tigers' massive monetary losses, and told Navin to find a buyer. Navin quickly cut a deal with the richest man in Michigan, lumber baron William Clyman Yawkey. However, Yawkey died before the deal closed, and Navin persuaded his son, Bill Yawkey, to complete the deal.

Yawkey mostly stayed in the background, largely leaving the Tigers in Navin's hands. In January 1908, Yawkey sold Navin almost half the club's stock, making him for all intents and purposes a full partner. Navin then became team president in name as well as in fact.

Baseball was not a side business for Navin. It was his principal business and passion. Navin once said: "No game is cleaner, healthier or more scientific. (Baseball brings) thousands of devotees out into the open air and the sunshine and distracts them from every contaminating influence." And legendary Detroit News sports editor H. G. Salsinger wrote that "Navin was one of the few owners who knew the playing end of the game as well as the business end."

== Reputation as a penny-pincher ==
Despite his love of the game, Navin developed a reputation as a penny-pincher, which was not surprising given he was trained as an accountant. A 1904 letter he wrote to Hall of Famer Sam Crawford adds to the reputation. After hitting .338 for the Tigers in 1903, Crawford took his used uniform home to Wahoo, Nebraska, prompting Navin to send the following letter:

Kindly forward last season's uniform to the Detroit Ball Club at once, so it can be put in shape for spring practice. As those uniforms are paid for by the Detroit club, they are, of course, the property of the Detroit club and should have been returned at the close of last season.

Navin's tightfisted nature came in part because unlike most of the other owners, he had no income apart from the Tigers. In 1919, after Yawkey's death, Navin bought 15 shares from the Yawkey estate to become half-owner of the Tigers. However, without Yawkey's fortune to fall back on, Navin had to take on additional investors to keep afloat. With this in mind, he brokered the sale of 25 percent of the Yawkey interest to auto-body manufacturer Walter Briggs, Sr., and another 25 percent to wheelmaker John Kelsey. In 1927, Briggs bought Kelsey's interest and became a full partner with Navin. However, Briggs largely stayed in the background.

Navin's tough negotiations and salary battles with Tiger players are legendary. In the 1920s, Tigers slugger Bob "Fats" Fothergill always had a weight problem, and Navin constantly rode Fothergill about it. When Fothergill came to Navin's office in the winter to negotiate his contract, he wore a big, heavy overcoat to conceal the weight he had put on in the offseason. Navin figured out what Fothergill was up to and turned the heat way up in his office. Navin then sat back and engaged Fothergill in a long, drawn-out conversation about his family, hunting, and anything but the contract. As sweat poured off Fothergill, Navin suggested that he take off the coat, but Fothergill insisted he was comfortable. When the conversation finally got around to the contract, Fothergill wanted to get out of Navin's hot office so badly that he accepted Navin's first offer.

Years later, when pitcher Elden Auker was called up to the Tigers in 1933, Navin told him: "Elden, we're bringing you up here as a starting pitcher. We think you have an opportunity to be a major league pitcher. I don't have a lot of money. My philosophy for starting pitchers is when they give you the ball, I expect you to pitch nine innings. I can't afford to pay you to start a ballgame and pay three or four others to finish it."

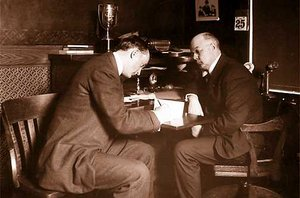
Ty Cobb and Frank Navin pose as Cobb signs a $5000 ($129,333 in 2012) contract for 1908 after Cobb's bitter holdout.

Navin's knowledge of the game and his reputation for penny-pinching are both reflected in his relationship with Ty Cobb.

In 1905, a young Cobb tried out with the Tigers, and many laughed at the skinny kid's eager tryout. But Navin was impressed with Cobb's effort and signed him for $1500. Each year thereafter, Navin and Cobb engaged in prolonged contract negotiations, with Cobb holding out at times, and Navin ultimately paying what was needed to retain the best batter in baseball. In 1925, the Tigers were offered an opportunity to purchase a young Paul Waner from the San Francisco Seals, but Navin was not willing to pay the $40,000 asking price. Cobb, who was the team's manager, was angered at Navin's refusal to sign Waner, and later said that their relationship deteriorated so much that "I couldn't stand to look at Navin."

== Later years (1911–1935) ==
In 1911, Navin tore down the Tigers' longtime home, Bennett Park, and built a new concrete-and-steel facility on the same site with a seating capacity of 23,000. The new park, named "Navin Field", opened on April 20, 1912. Renamed Briggs Stadium in 1938, and then Tiger Stadium in 1961, the park built by Navin remained the Tigers' home until 2000. In 1924, as Detroit grew, Navin built a second deck on his stadium, increasing the seating capacity to 30,000.

In May 1912, Navin found himself embroiled in the first player strike in American League history. During a game in New York, Ty Cobb jumped into the stands and attacked a handicapped heckler who had been taunting Cobb with racial epithets. When American League President Ban Johnson suspended Cobb indefinitely, the Tigers voted to strike, refusing to play until the suspension was lifted. When Ban Johnson threatened Navin with a $5,000 per game fine if he failed to field a team, Navin told manager Hughie Jennings to find replacement players. As the Tigers were on the road in Philadelphia, Jennings recruited eight replacement "Tigers" from a neighborhood in North Philadelphia. The replacement Tigers lost 24–2 to the Philadelphia Athletics. The regular Tigers returned after a one-game strike.

In 1920 Navin played a key role in the dissolution of the National Baseball Commission and the creation of the office of Commissioner of Baseball and the appointment of Judge Kenesaw Mountain Landis as the first commissioner. The American League owners had become divided into two factions. One faction, the Red Sox, White Sox and Yankees, sought to remove Ban Johnson as the league's president. The other faction, the Tigers, Indians, Athletics, Browns, and Senators, known as the "Loyal Five", supported Johnson. When the Black Sox Scandal broke after the 1920 season, the White Sox, Red Sox and Yankees threatened to pull out of the American League and join a new 12-team National League. The enlarged league would include a new team in Detroit unrelated to the Tigers — an obvious attempt to push out Navin, a longtime Johnson loyalist. However, Navin was in no mood for another war and persuaded the other five clubs to agree to appoint a new National Commission of non-baseball men. Judge Landis was tapped as chairman, but would only accept an appointment as sole commissioner, with nearly unlimited power over the game. The owners, desperate to fight the perception that baseball was crooked, readily agreed. Navin developed a close relationship with Landis, and Landis reportedly called Navin as many as 20 times a day for advice.

After the other American League owners forced Johnson on an indefinite sabbatical in January 1927, Navin became acting president of the American League. Johnson returned in time for the start of the 1927 season, but was forced out entirely after the season, and Navin served as acting president until Ernest Barnard was elected as permanent successor.

In 1931, Navin was nearly ruined by the Great Depression and by his losses betting on horse racing. Navin had a lifelong love of gambling on horse races, a quirk that was overlooked by his friend, Judge Landis. Navin also worked for a time as a croupier at a turn of the century gambling house in Detroit. He was thus forced to rely more and more on Briggs' money to keep the Tigers competitive.

By 1933, the Great Depression (and a losing team) had cut attendance at Navin Field to a third of what it had been a decade earlier. Navin contemplated selling the franchise and even entertained an offer from Ty Cobb. But Navin decided not to sell and tried to sign Babe Ruth as player-manager, hoping to revive interest in the team. However, Ruth was unwilling to postpone a planned trip to Hawaii, and in any event his asking price was well beyond what Navin was willing to pay. Instead, he ended up buying Mickey Cochrane from Connie Mack's Philadelphia Athletics for $100,000. Navin immediately installed Cochrane as player-manager, and Cochrane proved to be the sparkplug that helped the Tigers win two consecutive pennants in 1934 and 1935.

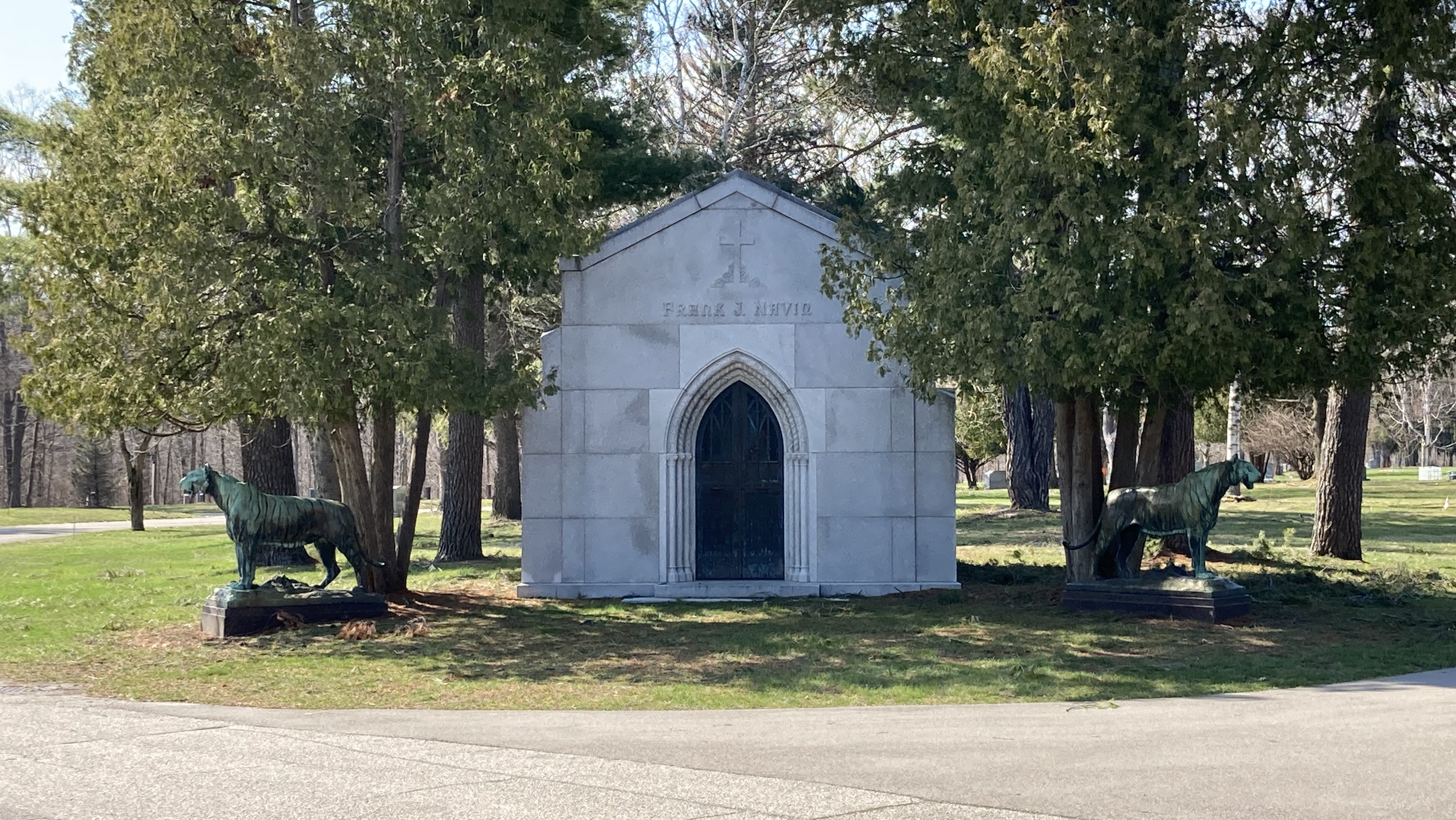
Navin mausoleum at Holy Sepulchre Cemetery

After the Tigers lost the 1934 World Series to the Gashouse Gang from St. Louis, the 64-year-old Navin was reportedly heartbroken, having seen his teams win four American League pennants, only to lose four World Series.

In October 1935, the Tigers finally brought Detroit its first undisputed world championship. Six weeks later, on November 13, 1935, Navin suffered a heart attack and fell from a horse while riding at the Detroit Riding and Hunt Club, killing him. Navin was buried in Holy Sepulchre Cemetery in Southfield, Michigan where the family mausoleum was decorated by Corrado Parducci and is guarded by two tigers by American animalier Frederick Roth.

== See also ==
- 1935 Detroit Tigers season

== Bibliography ==
- Burton, Clarence, "Frank J. Navin", The City of Detroit, Michigan: 1701–1922, vol. III. Detroit: S. J. Clarke Publishing Company, 1922. pp. 772–75.
