= Auto polo =

American-invented sport

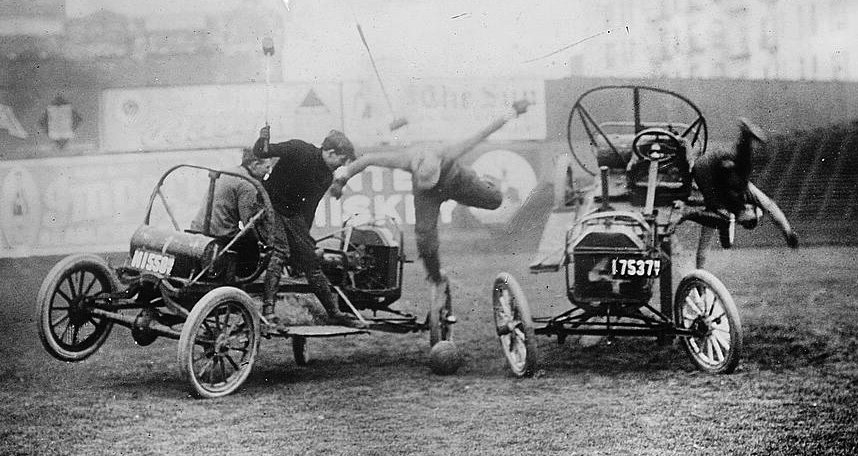
Auto polo match in the 1910s at Hilltop Park in New York. Malletmen were often thrown from the cars during matches.

Automobile polo or auto polo was a motorsport invented in the United States that featured rules and equipment similar to equestrian polo but using automobiles instead of horses. The sport was popular at fairs, exhibitions and sports venues across the United States and several areas in Europe from 1911 until the late 1920s; it was, however, dangerous and carried the risk of injury and death to the participants and spectators, and expensive damage to vehicles.

== History ==
The official inventor of auto polo is purported to be Ralph "Pappy" Hankinson, a Ford automobile dealer from Topeka who devised the sport as a publicity stunt in 1911 to sell Model T cars. The reported "first" game of auto polo occurred in an alfalfa field in Wichita on July 20, 1912, using four cars and eight players (dubbed the "Red Devils" and the "Gray Ghosts") and was witnessed by 5,000 people. While Hankinson is credited with the first widely publicized match and early promotion of the sport, the concept of auto polo is older and was proposed as early as 1902 by Joshua Crane of the Dedham Polo Club in Boston, with the Patterson Daily Press noting at the time of Crane's exhibition that the sport was "not likely to become very popular." Auto polo was also first played in New York City inside a regimental armory building in 1908 or 1909. The popularity of the sport increased after its debut in July 1912, with multiple auto polo leagues founded across the country under the guidance of the Auto Polo Association. The first large-scale exhibition of auto polo in the eastern United States was held on November 22, 1912, at League Stadium in Washington, D.C. Another exhibition was staged the following day at Hilltop Park in New York.[Brooklyn Daily Eagle, November 24, 1912, p. 14] By the 1920s, New York City and Chicago were the principal cities for auto polo in the United States with auto polo matches occurring every night of the week. In New York, matches were held at Madison Square Garden and Coney Island.

Internationally, auto polo was regarded with skepticism and caution. In 1912, the British motoring publication The Auto described the new sport as "very impressive" and a "lunatic game" that the writers hoped would not become popular in Britain. Hankinson himself promoted auto polo in Manila in the 1910s with events sponsored by Texaco and recruited teams in the United Kingdom. Auto polo was further spread to Europe by auto polo teams from Wichita that toured Europe in the summer of 1913 to promote the sport. In Toronto in 1913, auto polo became the first motorsport to be showcased at the Canadian National Exhibition, but the sport did not become popular in Canada.

The sport waned in popularity during the late 1920s, mostly due to the high cost of replacing vehicles, but did have a brief resurgence in the Midwestern United States after World War II. A tuk tuk polo tournament was held in Galle, Sri Lanka, starting in 2016.

== Rules and equipment ==
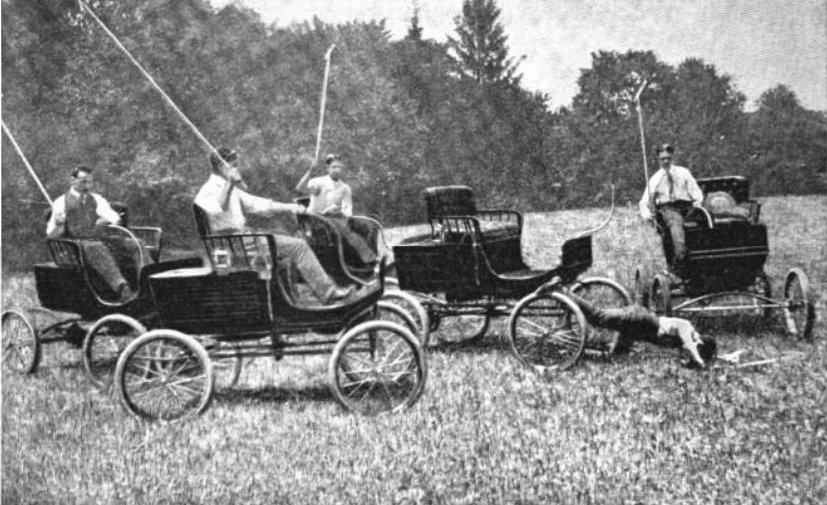
The Dedham Polo Club first used Mobile Runabouts for their exhibition game in 1902.

Unlike equestrian polo which requires large, open fields that can accommodate up to eight horses at a time, auto polo could be played in smaller, covered arenas during wintertime, a factor that greatly increased its popularity in the northern United States. The game was typically played on a field or open area that was a least 300 feet (91 m) long and 120 feet (37 m) wide with 15-foot (4.6 m) wide goals positioned at each end of the field. The game was played in two halves (chukkars) and each team had two cars and four men in play on the field at a given time. The first auto polo cars used by the Dedham Polo Club were unmodified, light steam-powered Mobile Runabouts that seated only one person and cost $650 (equivalent to $24,187 today). As the sport progressed, auto polo cars resembled stripped down Model Ts and usually did not have tops, doors or windshields, with later incarnations sometimes outfitted with primitive rollbars to protect the occupants. Cars typically had a seat-belted driver and a malletman that held on to the side of the car and would attempt to hit a regulation-sized basketball toward the goal of the opposing team with the cars reaching a top speed of 40 miles per hour (64 km/h) and while making hairpin turns. The mallets were shaped like croquet mallets but had a three-pound head to prevent "backfire" when striking the ball at high speeds.

== Safety and damage concerns ==
Due to the nature of the sport, cars would often collide with each other and become entangled, with malletmen frequently thrown from the cars. Installation of rollcages over the radiator and rear platforms of the cars helped prevent injuries to players, but falls did result in severe cuts and sometimes broken bones if players were run over by the cars, though deaths due to auto polo were rare. Most of the cars would usually be severely wrecked or demolished by the time the match was finished, leaving most players uninsurable for costly material and bodily damages incurred during the game. A tally of the damages encountered by Hankinson's British and American auto polo teams in 1924 revealed 1564 broken wheels, 538 burst tires, 66 broken axles, 10 cracked engines and six cars completely destroyed during the course of the year.

== Gallery ==
Auto polo
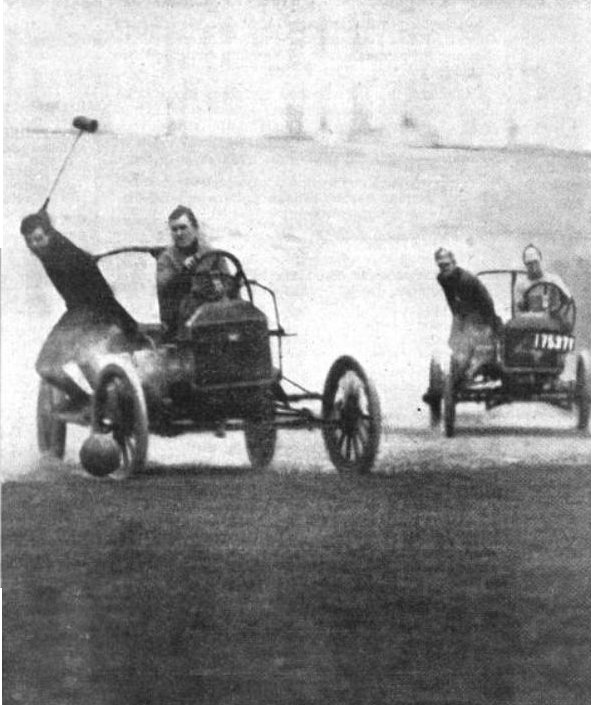
Auto poloists chase each other down the field in a 1913 photograph by Collier's Magazine.

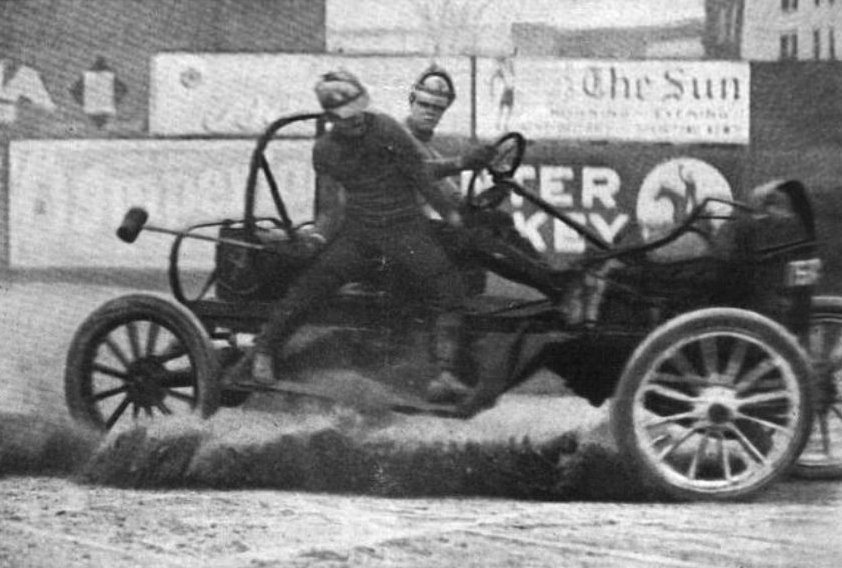
A malletman balances on the side of a moving auto polo car during a match at Hilltop Park, New York, in a photograph by the International News Service.

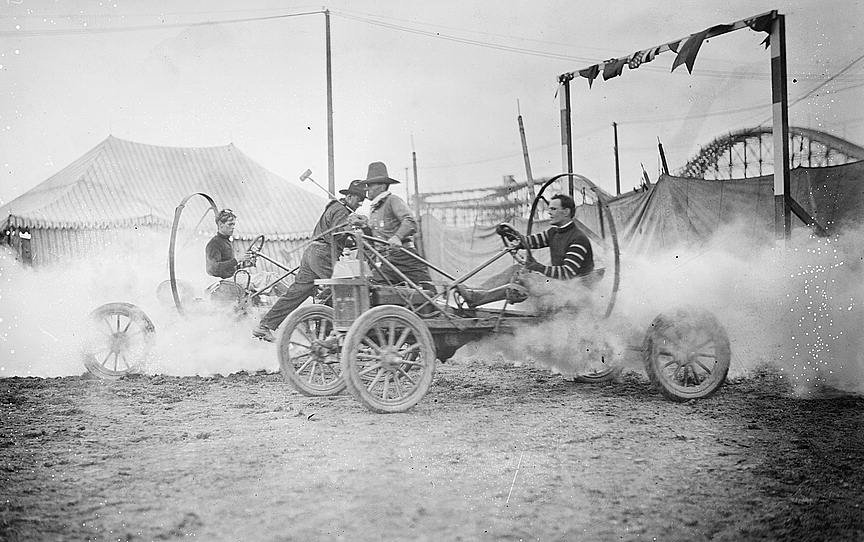
An auto polo match at Coney Island photographed by the Bain News Service. Cars had primitive metal hoops around the driver's seat and radiator to protect the occupants in the event of a rollover.

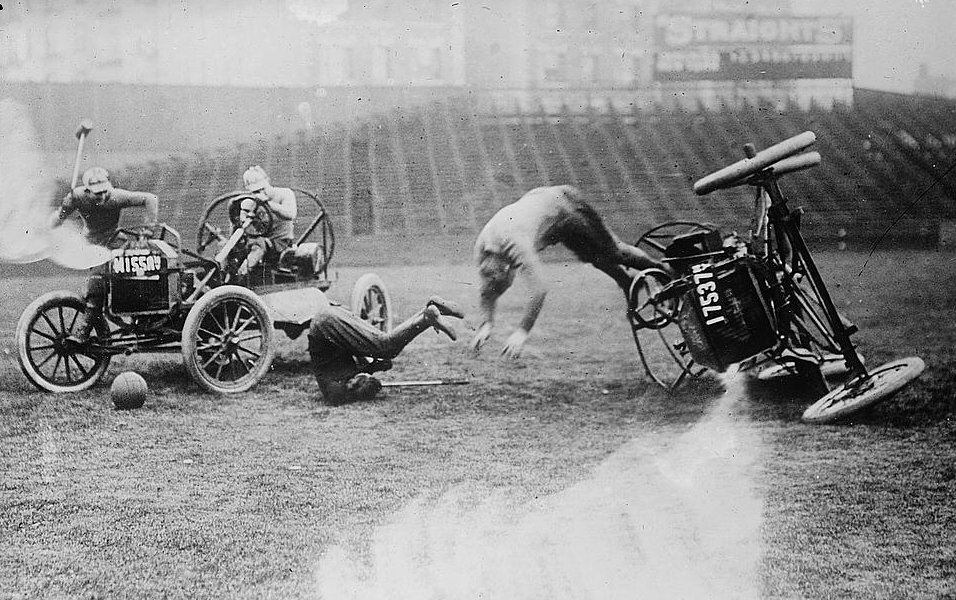
A rollover during a match at Hilltop Park, New York, in a photograph by the Bain News Service.

== See also ==
- Segway polo
