= 1912 suspension of Ty Cobb =

Suspension in Major League Baseball

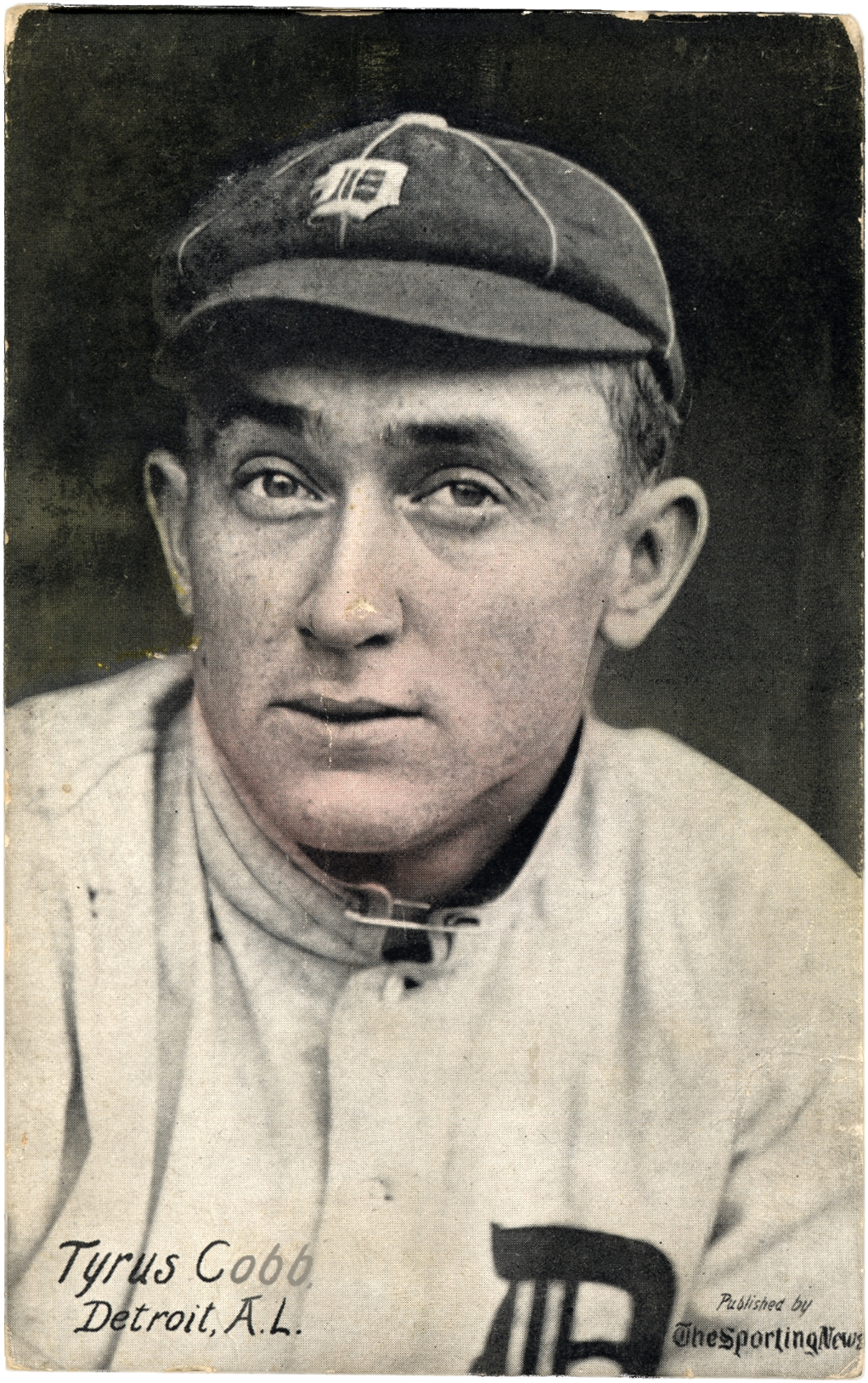
Cobb in 1913

During the 1912 baseball season, center fielder Ty Cobb of the Detroit Tigers was suspended for ten days after entering the spectator stands at New York's Hilltop Park during a game and physically assaulting Claude Lucker, a heckler. At the time, Cobb was among the biggest stars in the major leagues. American League president Ban Johnson suspended Cobb and fined him $50 ($1,700 in 2025).

Cobb had been Lucker's verbal target throughout the four-game series between the Tigers and New York Yankees. Facing a continued stream of insults and questioning about his racial ancestry, Cobb lost his temper in the fourth inning of the fourth game, on May 15, 1912. He raced into the stands, punching and kicking Lucker; Lucker had lost eight fingers in an industrial accident and could not defend himself. Cobb was ejected from the game. Johnson witnessed these events and suspended Cobb indefinitely. Since there were few protections for ballplayers at the time from insults and objects hurled by fans, many took Cobb's side, including his teammates. After defeating the Philadelphia Athletics on May 17, the Detroit players telegraphed Johnson that they would not play again until Cobb was reinstated; Johnson refused to do so.

Seeking to avoid a $5,000 fine ($117,000 in 2024) if Detroit did not field a team, owner Frank Navin instructed manager Hughie Jennings to recruit a team. Jennings did so with help from Connie Mack, the Philadelphia owner/manager. Facing baseball's defending World Series champions, the replacement team lost 24–2. After the game, Johnson travelled to Philadelphia to negotiate with the players. At Cobb's urging, they returned to work. The striking players were fined, as was Cobb when his suspension was lifted on May 25, but Navin paid all penalties. Baseball's first major league strike, the walkout had little effect, but teams added security to stadium seating areas.

== Background ==
By 1912, fan conduct in major league ballparks had become a matter of public discussion. Despite efforts to provide a family-friendly atmosphere, it was common for some of those attending to spend time hurling bottles and epithets at those on the field. Players sometimes responded verbally, or even physically—Cy Young, who had a reputation as mild-mannered, had gone into the stands to confront a heckler. There were no security guards or ushers at the time, and the police could be as partial as the fans.

Ty Cobb of the Detroit Tigers was one of the dominant players in the major leagues in 1912 and one of baseball's biggest stars. The previous season, he had won the batting title with an average of .420, and led the American League in runs, hits, doubles, triples, run batted in (RBIs), slugging percentage, and stolen bases. He was also controversial, notable for violent actions on and off the field. A native of Georgia, he had the racial attitudes of many whites of his state at the time, although in later life, he expressed support for the integration of baseball.

Claude Lucker (sometimes rendered "Lueker") was a former printing press operator for The New York Times who had lost eight fingers in an industrial accident about 1910, and subsequently did odd jobs for the former sheriff of New York County, Thomas F. Foley. His employment paid enough for him to be well-dressed and to attend all four games of the series between the Tigers and the New York Yankees. (Note: By 1912, the nickname "Yankees" had become more prevalent than the team's previous nickname, "Highlanders". See Alexander, p. 825.) There, he sat along the left field foul line in the stands past third base and engaged himself in hurling insults at Cobb in center field. According to Cobb, Lucker had been heckling him for years. The reasons for Lucker's hostility toward Cobb are unknown; the player's biographer, Richard Bak, suggested that it was a case of "one of life's victims venting his bitterness" at "a thin-skinned star whose slow burn made for great sport".

Lucker, like Cobb, had lived in Georgia, and the insults Lucker shouted at Cobb often focused on racial matters. Lucker called Cobb's mother a "nigger lover" and Cobb himself "half black" and a "coon". Cobb shouted for Lucker to go back to his "waiter's job" but Lucker persisted. By May 15, the fourth and final game of the series between the two teams, Cobb's patience was nearly exhausted. According to Bak, "on the afternoon of May 15, 1912, Claude Lucker outdid himself, pushing Cobb over the edge and setting in motion one of the wildest chain of events in sports history".

== Game at Hilltop Park ==
Hilltop Park, the site of the game during which Cobb attacked a fan

During pregame fielding practice Cobb muffed a fly ball, and someone in the stands yelled, "Hey, are you on dope?" Lucker later denied being the person who yelled this; regardless, the accusation upset Cobb. Between the home halves of the first and second inning, with Detroit batting, Cobb remained behind the outfield rather than return to the dugout and pass Lucker. During the third inning, Cobb visited the Yankee dugout and asked for Frank J. Farrell, co-owner of the team, apparently in an attempt to have Lucker removed from the ballpark, but Farrell could not be located and Cobb made no request of other Yankee officials. Lucker was not the only fan screaming insults at Cobb, and the epithets questioned Cobb's race and morals.

The stream of insults from Lucker continued into the fourth inning. One of Cobb's teammates, perhaps Davy Jones or Sam Crawford, suggested to Cobb that he could not let the insults pass. This was enough to spark Cobb's rage, and he ran over to where Lucker was sitting, leaped into the stands, and began to punch and kick Lucker as other fans tried to get out of his way. Fans shouted at Cobb, "He has no hands!", referring to Lucker's disability, which meant he could not defend himself. Cobb responded, continuing to pummel Lucker, "I don't care if he has no feet."

The Detroit manager, Hughie Jennings, by some accounts stated to the press that he heard Cobb called a "half-nigger" and "no Southerner would stand such an insult". Jennings added that he "knew it would be useless to restrain Ty as he would have got his tormentor sooner or later. When Ty's Southern blood is aroused, he is a bad man to handle." Lucker stated to the press that he had been on good terms with Cobb until the incident, despite the insults, which Lucker termed mere kidding or joshing. He denied being the person who called Cobb a "coon" and contended the ballplayer had, in assaulting him, gotten the wrong person.

Fred Westervelt, one of the umpires, separated the two men with the aid of a Pinkerton guard. Cobb was kicked out of the game but was allowed to remain in the dugout for several innings, and the fans cheered him as he was taken away from Lucker. Detroit beat New York, 8–4.

The American League president, Ban Johnson, was present at Hilltop Park that day and saw the incident. He sent one of his assistants, named O'Neill, over to Lucker to urge him not to have Cobb arrested, and O'Neill got Lucker to leave the ballpark, though what if anything he was promised in exchange for not filing a complaint is unknown. He did feel free to voice his opinion of Cobb, first to anyone who would listen on his way out of Hilltop Park, and then to the baseball press.

Much of the press supported Cobb, stating that he had been a target for fan abuse in every ballpark the Tigers visited. The entire Georgia congressional delegation, including both senators, sent Cobb a telegram applauding his actions. Johnson summoned Cobb to the league president's hotel room on the evening of May 15 and asked the player for his version of events. Cobb recounted the epithet regarding his ancestry and stated that when a spectator called him that, "I think it is about time to fight". Johnson was aghast at Cobb's defense.

== Cobb suspended ==
The Tigers traveled to Philadelphia for a series against the Athletics, but the first game, on May 16, was rained out. That evening, Johnson informed Jennings that Cobb was suspended indefinitely for the May 15 incident, to which Cobb objected. "Johnson has always believed himself to be infallible. He suspends a man first and then investigates afterward. It should be the reverse." Johnson responded that Cobb may have had "great provocation", but he should have appealed to the umpire to have Lucker thrown out of the ballpark: "What right did Cobb have to rush into the stand, knock down a man and kick him with his spikes?"

Angered by the indefinite suspension of Cobb, the players for the Tigers sent a telegram to Johnson stating they would not play beyond the game with the Athletics on May 17 if Cobb's suspension was not lifted. Baseball historian Harold Seymour found it significant that all 18 Detroit players joined in, showing the depth of player resentment at spectator abuse, despite the fact that some disliked Cobb. They wrote,

Feeling that Mr. Cobb is being done an injustice by your action in suspending him we, the undersigned, refuse to play in another game after today until such action is adjusted to our satisfaction. He was fully justified in his actions, as no one could stand such personal abuse from anyone. We want him reinstated for tomorrow's game, May 18 or there will be no game. If players cannot have protection we must protect ourselves.

Jennings backed his players, saying, "The suspension was not warranted. I am in the hands of my players, if they refuse to play I will finish way down in the races. I expect Johnson to reconcile the matter, fine Cobb or announce definitely the length of the suspension." Johnson received the telegram on the evening of May 17. He responded that Cobb was not permanently banned, but only until the investigation was complete. He told the owner of the Tigers, Frank Navin, that the franchise would be fined $5,000 ($117,000 in 2024) if it failed to put a team on the field to face the Athletics on May 18. Navin instructed Jennings to make sure the Tigers had a team there, by whatever means were necessary.

Accordingly, Jennings and his coaches Deacon McGuire and Joe Sugden, with the help of the Athletics owner/manager, Connie Mack, decided to seek replacement players who could take the field for the Tigers on May 18 if Cobb's teammates did not relent. Mack was willing to be helpful because he feared losing a day's gate receipts. There are various accounts of how they went about this. By one version, Aloysius Travers, a student at Saint Joseph's College who was an outfielder on a team called the Park Sparrows, was tipped off by a sports editor named John Nolan to bring as many players as he could recruit to Shibe Park the following day. Nolan told Jennings that the players would be there and waiting. By another account, Jennings and his coaches (who would also play in the game), combed the streets for players and held tryouts at the team hotel. According to Mack biographer Norman Macht, both stories may be true.

Another version of the story has Mack informing Jennings that the Athletics had played (and lost) an exhibition game to Saint Joseph's baseball team, the Philadelphia collegiate city champions, during spring training, and had Jennings get in touch with Nolan, who referred him to Travers. However, the Saint Joseph's team had played a game out of town on Friday and apparently declined the offer, leaving Travers to gather up whatever volunteers he could find. In addition to himself, he secured five sandlot baseball players and two amateur boxers.

Travers and the others were in the grandstand when the Tigers, including Cobb, came on the field on the afternoon of May 18. Cobb was asked to leave the field by umpire Bill Dinneen; he did, and his teammates followed. The replacement players also went into the clubhouse, where the striking Tigers gave them the shirts off their backs and they were signed to one-day contracts by Jennings. Then, they went out on the field to face the two-time defending World Series champion Athletics, featuring the future Hall of Famers Home Run Baker, Eddie Collins and Herb Pennock. Mack had hinted he would play his reserves against the substitute Tigers, but he chose six of his eight starting position players, with veteran pitcher Jack Coombs to start for his team. Travers took the pitching assignment for the Tigers upon learning that the pitcher would be paid more; by other accounts he was the best performer at the pitching tryouts. Many of Cobb's teammates sat in the stands to see what would happen.

== Replacement game ==
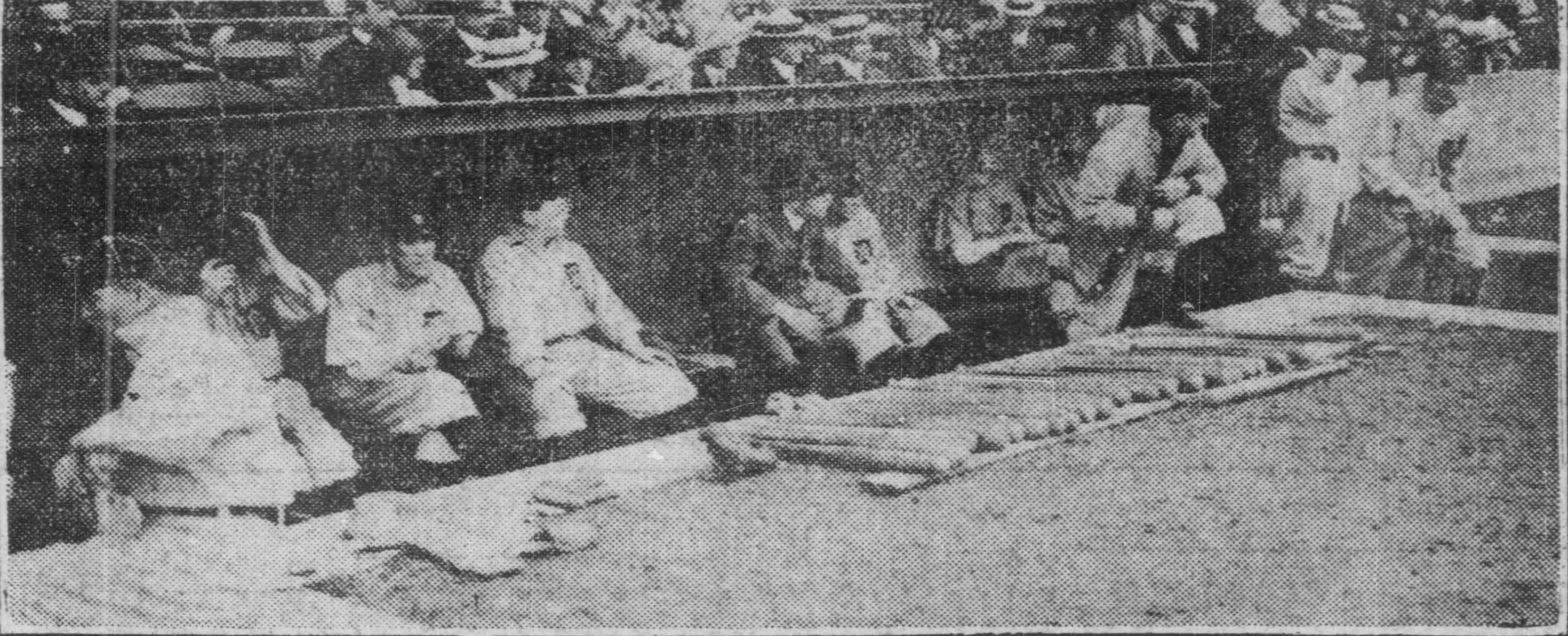
The replacement players in the Detroit dugout

About 15,000 fans came to Shibe Park to see the game. In the top of the first inning, the Tigers were retired in order. Philadelphia scored three times in the bottom of the first, with three hits (two on bunts), two stolen bases and a throwing error by McGuire on the attempted stolen base. Travers, who was advised to throw slow balls, tried throwing a fastball to Home Run Baker, who hit it well out of the park but barely foul.

Detroit went in order in the top of the second, with Coombs securing two strikeouts. Travers was able to hold Philadelphia without a run in the bottom of the inning; catcher Jack Lapp singled, but was out trying to extend it to a double. In the top of the third, Detroit managed only a walk from right fielder Hap Ward, who was out attempting to steal second base. The bottom of the third saw Detroit retire the first two batters, then Collins bunted a ball that third baseman Billy Maharg fumbled. Collins stole second and went to third on another wild throw from McGuire. Baker bunted for a base hit and stole second; Danny Murphy walked to load the bases. Stuffy McInnis hit to shortstop Vincent Maney, who let the ball by him and all three baserunners scored. This made the score 6–0 Philadelphia.

Maharg was unable to continue after losing two teeth to a ground ball, so Ed Irwin pinch hit for him in the top of the fourth. Irwin tripled, but could not score against Boardwalk Brown, who had replaced Coombs on the pitcher's mound for Philadelphia. The Athletics did not score in the bottom of the fourth despite getting two singles. In the top of the fifth, Sugden and McGuire each singled with one out, and Maney walked. Catcher Lapp threw to first in an attempt to pick off Maney, but the throw got away, and Sugden and McGuire scored to cut Philadelphia's lead to 6–2.

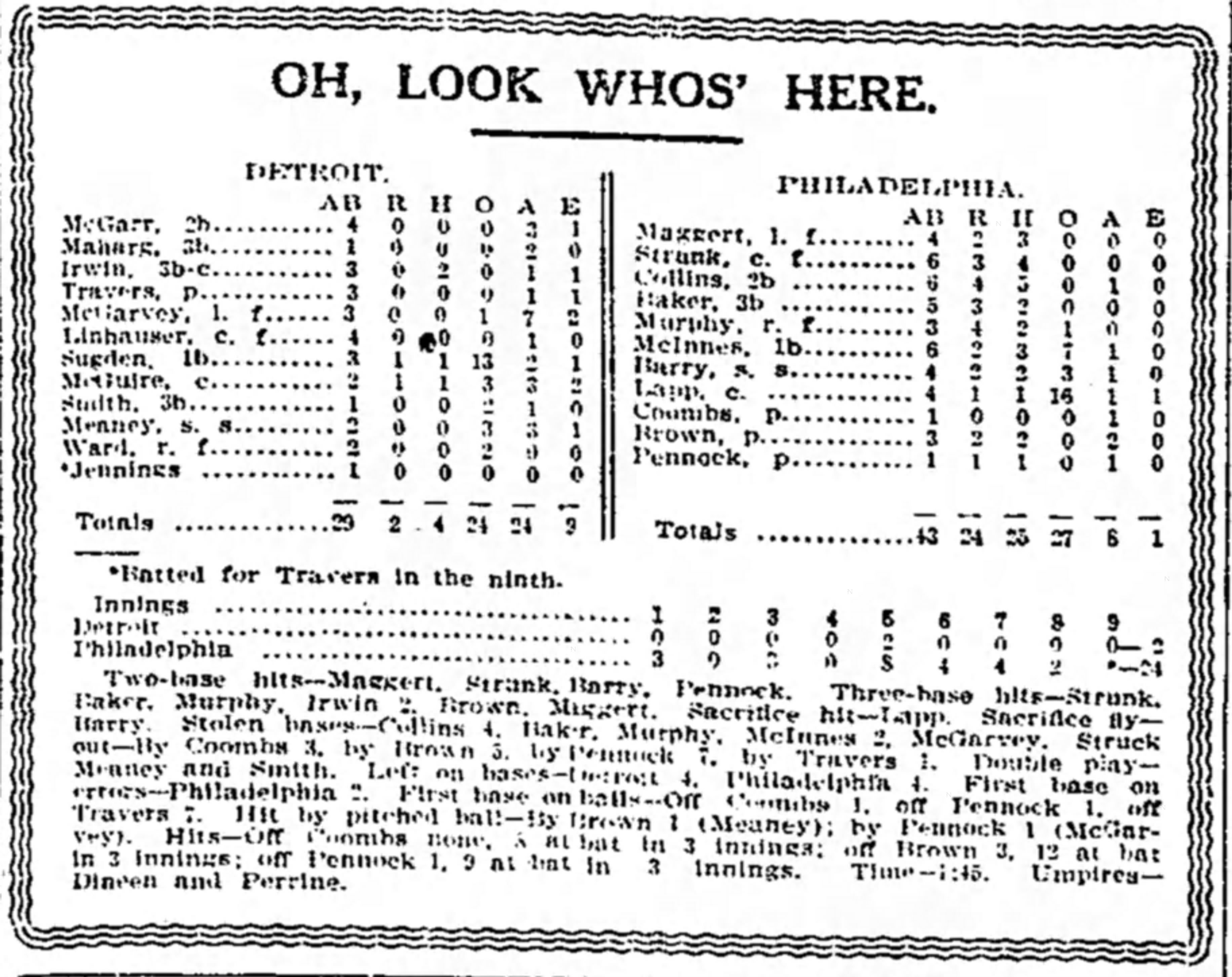
Box score of the game, from the Detroit Free Press

Philadelphia scored eight times in the bottom of the fifth inning, with Jack Barry beginning the scoring with a bases-loaded double. Barry was himself driven in by a single by the pitcher, Brown. With two on following a walk, Strunk hit a fly ball to right field, but Ward fell down and the hit went for a double, scoring two more runs. Collins bunted for a base hit, with Strunk scoring all the way from second base, and then stole second. After Baker grounded out, Murphy tripled, scoring Collins, but was out trying to extend it to an inside the park home run, retiring the side with the score 14–2 Philadelphia.

Four runs followed in the bottom of the sixth, with the highlights triples from Brown and Strunk, and a double from Harl Maggert, each of which drove in a run. Collins also drove in a run with a single, making the score 18–2. Pennock relieved Brown in the top of the seventh. He allowed a walk to McGuire, who was picked off first base for the third out. In the bottom of the seventh, four more runs scored, two of them on a double by Pennock and a triple by Maggert making the score 22–2. Bill Leinhauser, Cobb's 18-year-old replacement in center field, was hit on the head by one fly ball, leading Jennings to advise him, "Don't try to catch them. Just play them off the walls." Leinhauser, like Maharg, was not a baseball player; the two were amateur boxers.

In the bottom of the eighth inning, Collins reached on an error, then stole second base and continued to third as no one was covering the base. Baker tripled, scoring Collins, and after Travers retired the next two batters, Barry doubled, driving in Baker. He was caught trying to steal third base to retire the side, but the score at that point was 24–2 in favor of Philadelphia. In the top of the ninth, Irwin tripled, his second of the game. Jennings batted for Travers, but struck out. Dan McGarvey was hit by a pitch and stole second base, but Pennock retired the next two batters to end the game.

Coombs was the winning pitcher; there was no requirement at the time that a starting pitcher complete five innings to be credited with the win. Travers took the loss, having completed the entire game, and Pennock was later credited with a save despite never having less than a sixteen-run lead. Travers's 24 runs allowed set a major league record that has never been equalled or surpassed. His 26 hits allowed by a pitcher tied a major league record, broken (with 29) in an 18-inning game by Eddie Rommel of the Athletics in 1932.

Of the players recruited to join the Tigers, only Irwin got a hit, though his two triples did not figure into the scoring. Irwin, a 30-year-old semipro player, concluded his brief major league career with a lifetime batting average of .667 and a slugging percentage of 2.000. The everyday coaches, Sugden and McGuire, aged 41 and 48 respectively, got the other two hits for Detroit. Manager Jennings, who pinch-hit in the ninth inning, was aged 43 at the time. Tigers shortstop Donie Bush said, "It's a circus. Gosh, I'm glad I came." Jim Delahanty, who had helped instigate the strike, commented, "This is great, I wouldn't have missed it for a minute."

== Remainder of suspension and aftermath ==
Jennings stated after the game: "I put a team on the field today to save the owners of the Detroit franchise from being fined $5,000. It is now up to President Johnson of the league and President Navin of the Detroit club to settle with the 'strikers'. I do not intend to take sides one way or the other. You can say this much for me. There will be a club, professional club of some sort on the field at Shibe Park on Monday." While the Detroit Free Press supported the players' actions, The Sporting News called Cobb a "natural insurrectionist" and The New York Times compared the players' actions to a mutiny of soldiers.

Since Sunday baseball was still illegal in Pennsylvania at that time, there was no game on May 19, and Johnson, who arrived in Philadelphia on Sunday, cancelled the Tigers-Athletics game for May 20, stating that Detroit would not play again until the regular players were on the field. Johnson assembled Cobb's teammates and told them they would be fined $100 ($3,000 in 2025) per game if they refused to play; they remained resolute. Cobb, however, urged them to go back to work. On Tuesday, they beat the host Washington Senators and pitcher Walter Johnson, 2–0. According to Seymour, "although the strike was quickly broken, it was significant in that it exemplified a growing dissatisfaction among major-league players." The strike by the Tigers, the first such labor action in the major leagues, led to the formation of the first players' union, headed by Dave Fultz, but the organization lasted only a few years and had no lasting effect.

Cobb's teammates were fined $100 each, representing $50 each for the Saturday game and the cancelled Monday game. On the evening of May 25, Johnson, who had pledged to deal as lightly with Cobb as possible, lifted his suspension and fined him $50 ($1,700 in 2025). Navin had pledged to pay all fines incurred by the players, and Cobb's salary (he was in the third and final year of a contract that paid him $9,000 per season ($211,100 in 2025)) was unaffected by the suspension.

Detroit had a record of 13–14 through May 15. Of the six games played with Cobb under suspension, all on the road, they won two (the May 17 game against Philadelphia and the May 21 game against Washington). On his return they won their next four games but finished the season sixth out of eight in the American League with a record of 69–84. Johnson had promised additional security in American League ballparks, and in the aftermath of Cobb's suspension, almost all teams complied.

Travers later became a Catholic priest, the only priest ever to have major league experience. Billy Maharg became a driver and assistant trainer for the Philadelphia Phillies and was allowed to play in their final game of the 1916 season, the only one of the recruited players to play again in the major leagues. Maharg was one of the gamblers involved in the Black Sox scandal, when members of the Chicago White Sox helped throw the 1919 World Series. The Detroit manager, Jennings, appeared in one more game for the Tigers, in 1918. Leinhauser later became a policeman for the city of Philadelphia. The last to die of the replacement players, second baseman Jim McCarr, lived until 1981. McCarr outlived by 65 years the first replacement player to die, Irwin, who died in 1916 after being thrown through a saloon window.

== See also ==
- List of violent spectator incidents in sports

== Bibliography ==
- Alexander, Charles (1984). Ty Cobb. Oxford University Press. ISBN 978-0-8032-6359-8.
- Allen, Lee (1962). The American League Story. Hill & Wang. OCLC 1147859.
- Bak, Richard (1994). Ty Cobb: His Tumultuous Life and Times. Taylor Publishing Company. ISBN 978-0-87833-848-1.
- Macht, Norman L. (2007). Connie Mack and the Early Years of Baseball. University of Nebraska Press. ISBN 978-0-8032-3263-1.
- Rhodes, Don (2008). Ty Cobb: Safe at Home. New York: Lyons Press. ISBN 978-0-7627-4480-0.
- Seymour, Harold; Seymour Mills, Dorothy (1971). Baseball: The Golden Age. Oxford University Press. ISBN 978-0-19-802012-7.
