= Joe Sugden (baseball) =

American baseball player (1870–1959)

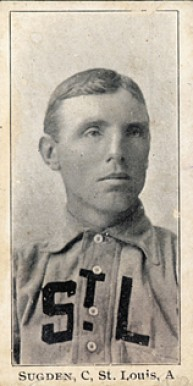
- Catcher
- Born: July 31, 1870; Philadelphia, Pennsylvania, U.S.
- Died: June 28, 1959 (aged 88); Philadelphia, Pennsylvania, U.S.
- Batted: Switch Threw: Right

MLB debut
- July 20, 1893, for the Pittsburgh Pirates

Last MLB appearance
- May 18, 1912, for the Detroit Tigers

MLB statistics
- Batting average: .255
- Home runs: 3
- Runs batted in: 283
- Stats at Baseball Reference

Teams
- Pittsburgh Pirates (1893–1897); St. Louis Browns (1898); Cleveland Spiders (1899); Chicago White Sox (1901); St. Louis Browns (1902–1905); Detroit Tigers (1912)

Joseph Sugden (July 31, 1870 – June 28, 1959) was an American professional baseball catcher. He played in Major League Baseball from 1893 to 1912 for the Pittsburgh Pirates, St. Louis Browns, Cleveland Spiders, Chicago White Sox, St. Louis Browns and Detroit Tigers.

== Biography ==
Sugden got a base hit in his final game on May 18, 1912, as a member of the coaching staff for the replacement Tigers called into service when the team went on strike to protest the suspension of Ty Cobb.

In his later years, Sugden was a scout for the St. Louis Cardinals, a position he held until his death in 1959 at the age of 88.

== See also ==
- List of St. Louis Cardinals coaches
