= Detroit Tigers replacement players (May 18, 1912) =

American baseball player

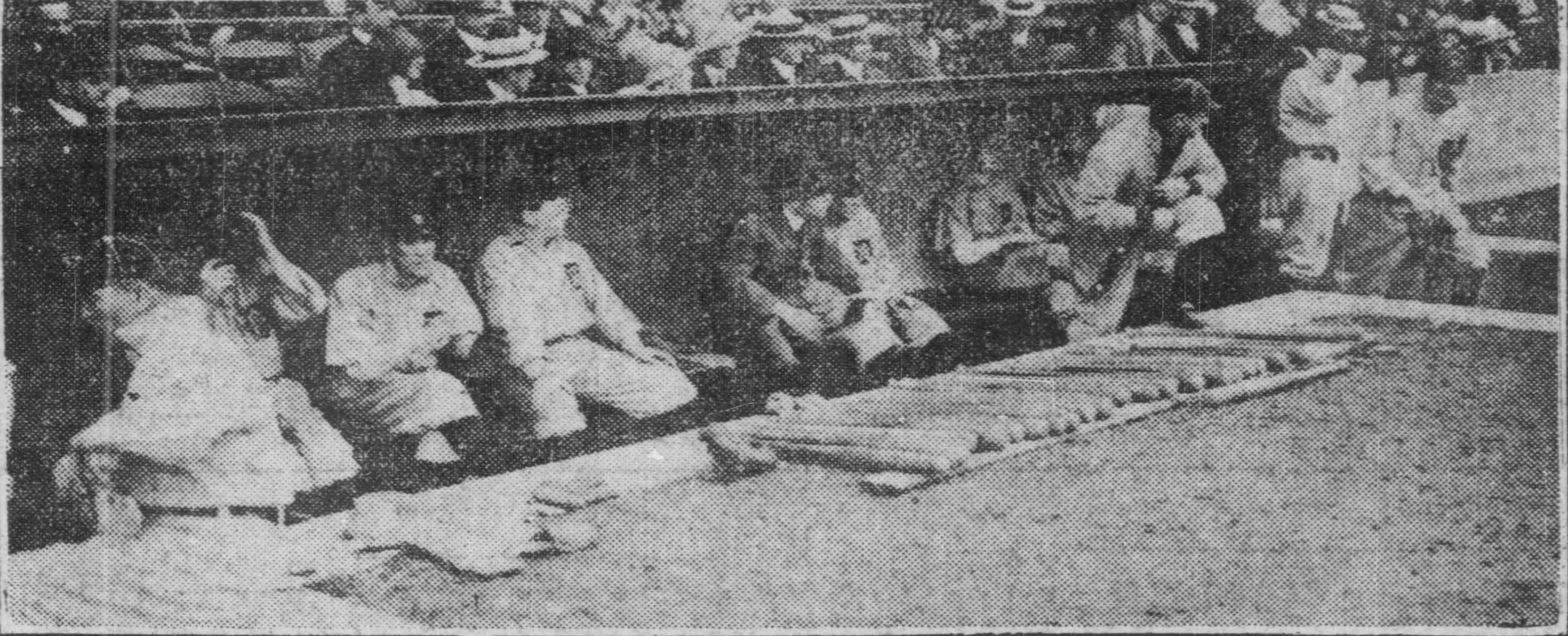
Replacement players of the Tigers in the dugout in Philadelphia

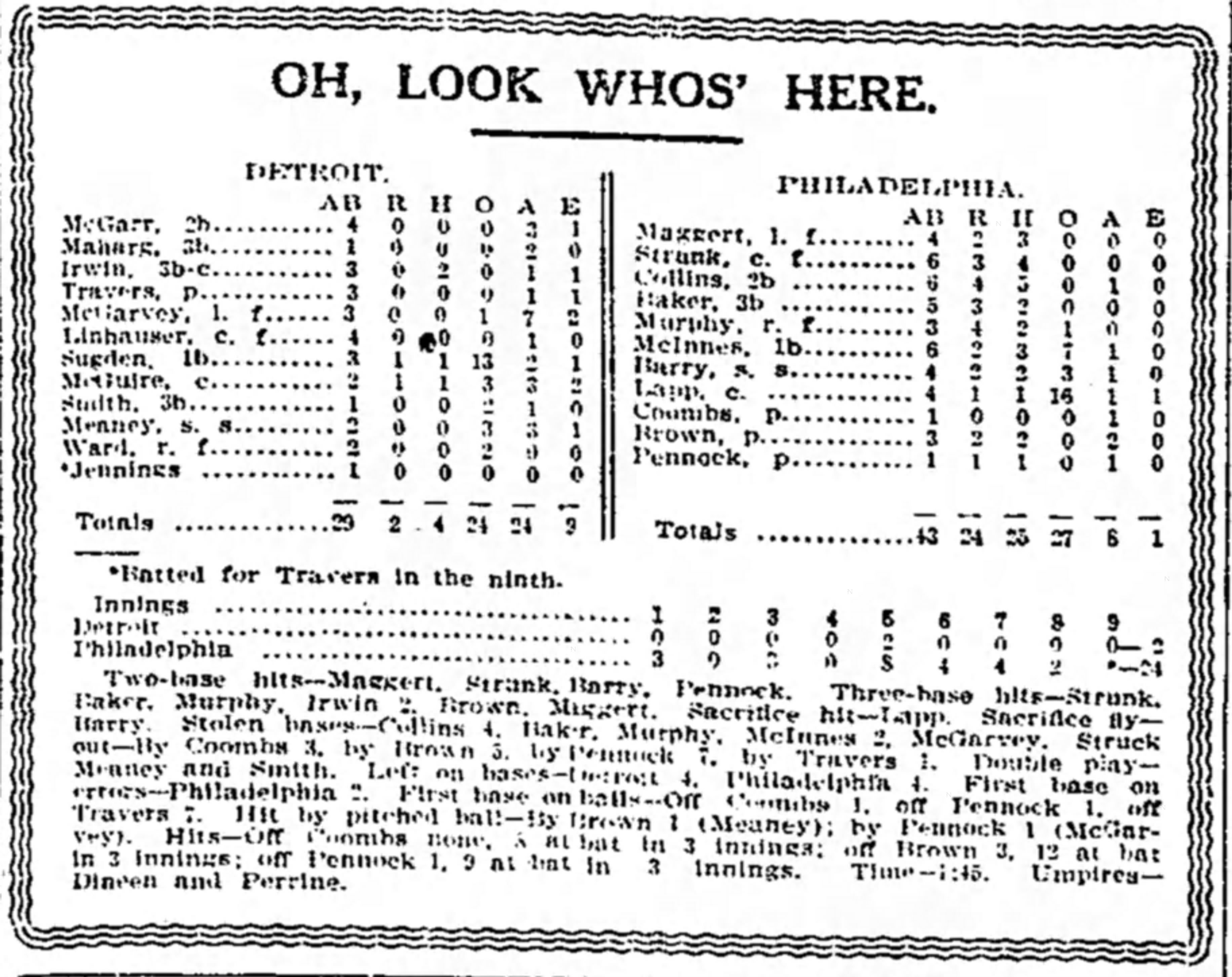
Box score of the game

The Detroit Tigers replacement players represented the Detroit Tigers of the American League in a major-league baseball game played on May 18, 1912, against the Philadelphia Athletics at Shibe Park in Philadelphia, Pennsylvania.

== Context ==
On May 15, 1912, after a game against the New York Yankees in New York, Tigers star Ty Cobb was taunted by a fan named Claude Lueker. According to several accounts, Lueker triggered Cobb's anger by calling him "a half nigger". According to another version, Lueker also yelled at Cobb, "your sisters screw niggers" and "your mother is a whore." Cobb leapt into the stands where he assaulted Lueker. Lueker was unable to defend himself, having lost one hand and three fingers from the other hand in an industrial accident. When fans yelled at Cobb that the man had no hands, Cobb shouted back, "I don't care if he has no feet!" American League president Ban Johnson responded by suspending Cobb indefinitely.

Cobb's teammates voted to strike, declaring that they would not take the field until Cobb was reinstated. It was the first strike in baseball history. Johnson refused to back down and told Detroit owner Frank Navin that the team would be fined $5,000 ($166,810 in 2025) for every game in which they failed to field a team.

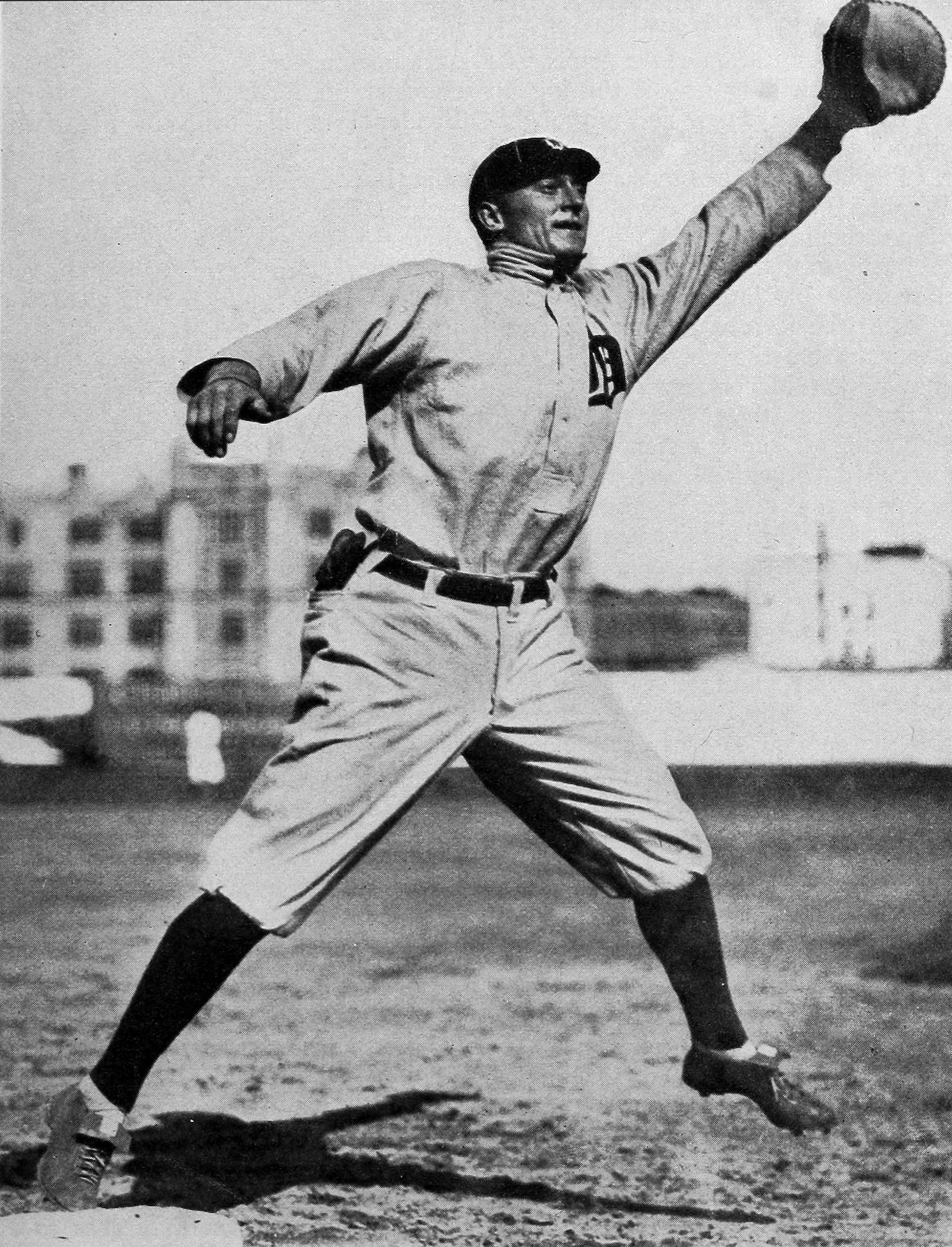
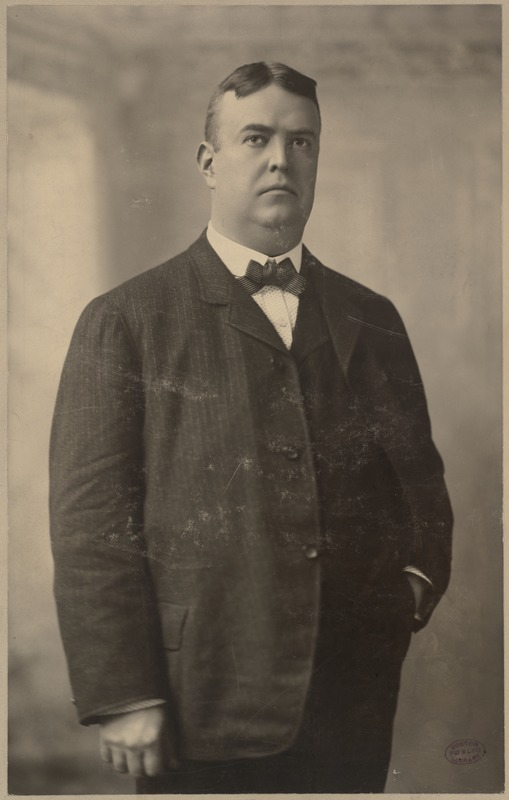
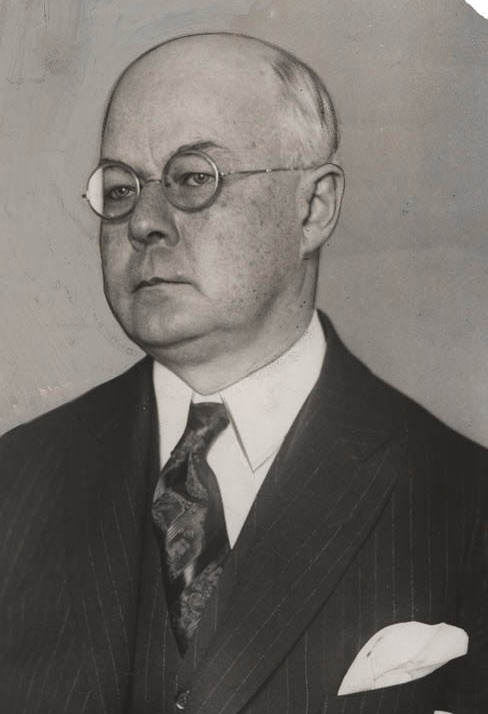
From left: Ty Cobb, Ban Johnson, and Frank Navin

Navin ordered manager Hughie Jennings to find players willing to take the field. The Tigers were on the road in Philadelphia, and so Jennings recruited eight replacement players from a neighborhood in North Philadelphia. Each man was paid $25 ($834.10 in 2025) or $50 ($1,668 in 2025). The Athletics set a team scoring record in defeating the replacement Tigers by a score of 24 to 2, tallying 26 hits, 42 total bases, and ten stolen bases (five by Eddie Collins). The Tigers' starting pitcher, Allan Travers, was a college student who became a Catholic priest and later confessed he had never pitched in his life.

The Tigers' manager Hughie Jennings (age 43) and coaches Joe Sugden (age 41) and Deacon McGuire (age 48), each of whom previously had long and distinguished careers as players, also played in the May 18 game for the Tigers. For all three men, it was their only playing appearance of the 1912 season. Jennings played in only one more major league game, in 1918. It was the final game of both Sugden's and McGuire's careers. The unplanned appearance raised McGuire's career total to 26 seasons, a record that was not surpassed until 1993 by Nolan Ryan. McGuire, who became the last player born during the American Civil War to appear in a major league game, recorded two fielding assists in the game for a career total of 1,859, which remains the all-time record for catchers.

After the embarrassing display, Johnson met personally with the striking players and told them they would be banned for life if the strike continued. Cobb urged his teammates to end the strike, and they complied. Accordingly, the major league careers of the replacement Tigers players lasted one game.

== Replacement players ==
=== Ed Irwin ===
Ed Irwin
- Third baseman
- Born: 1882; Philadelphia, Pennsylvania, U.S.
- Died: February 5, 1916 (aged 32–33); Philadelphia, Pennsylvania, U.S.
- Batted: Right Threw: Right

MLB debut
- May 18, 1912, for the Detroit Tigers

Last MLB appearance
- May 18, 1912, for the Detroit Tigers

MLB statistics
- Batting average: .667
- Triples: 2

Teams
- Detroit Tigers (1912)

William Edward Irwin (1882 – February 5, 1916) sometimes referred to as Ed Irvin, played at third base for the Tigers during the player strike.

Irwin had two triples in three plate appearances for a .667 batting average. He was the only replacement Tiger to get a hit in the game. Two members of the coaching staff (Deacon McGuire and Joe Sugden), who were pressed into service for that game, also got one hit each. Defensively, Irwin had two chances with an assist and an error. Pitcher Allan Travers later recalled: "I was doing fine until they started bunting. The guy playing third base had never played baseball before."

On February 5, 1916, Irwin and William Fitzmeyer got into an argument in a Philadelphia saloon near its front bulk window. After arguing for a while, the fight got physical. As other patrons struggled to break them up, Fitzmeyer moved Irwin towards the window and pushed him hard enough that Irwin ended up going through the window. Irwin fell on to the damaged glass and cut his jugular vein. Despite attempts to save his life, including a surgeon on a nearby ambulance, Irwin died on the way to the hospital.

A play about his life, The Perfect Hands of the Irresistible Ed was written by David James Brock.

=== Bill Leinhauser ===
Bill Leinhauser
- Center fielder
- Born: November 4, 1893; Philadelphia, Pennsylvania, U.S.
- Died: April 14, 1978 (aged 84); Elkins Park, Pennsylvania, U.S.
- Batted: Right Threw: Right

MLB debut
- May 18, 1912, for the Detroit Tigers

Last MLB appearance
- May 18, 1912, for the Detroit Tigers

MLB statistics
- Batting average: .000
- Home runs: 0
- Runs batted in: 0

Teams
- Detroit Tigers (1912)

William Charles Leinhauser (November 4, 1893 – April 14, 1978) played center field for the replacement Tigers on May 18, 1912.

A Philadelphia native, Leinhauser was a noted amateur welterweight boxer. In the replacement game, he took Ty Cobb's spot in center field. He had no hits and struck out three times in four plate appearances. Defensively, he had only one chance and was credited with an assist and no errors. Leinhauser later recalled that he wore Cobb's uniform and used his glove while playing in center field. According to one account, "when Leinhauser's wife found that he had the audacity to replace the great Ty Cobb, she hit him with a skillet."

During World War I, Leinhauser served in France for the U.S. Army with an antiaircraft artillery squad. He worked for the Philadelphia Police Department for 41 years, including 29 years with the narcotics squad. He retired in 1959 as captain of the North Central Detective Division. He died at age 84 in 1978 at Rolling Hill Hospital.

=== Billy Maharg ===
Billy Maharg
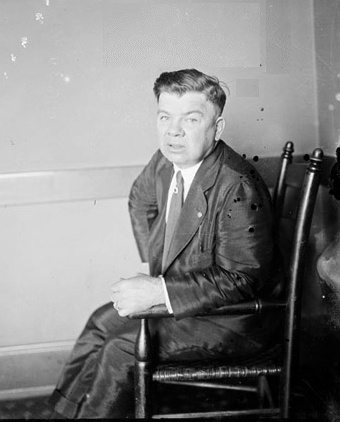
- Image from Chicago Daily News negatives collection, Chicago History Museum.
- Third baseman/Outfielder
- Born: March 19, 1881; Philadelphia, Pennsylvania, U.S.
- Died: November 20, 1953 (aged 72); Philadelphia, Pennsylvania, U.S.
- Batted: Right Threw: Right

MLB debut
- May 18, 1912, for the Detroit Tigers

Last MLB appearance
- October 5, 1916, for the Philadelphia Phillies

Teams
- Detroit Tigers (1912); Philadelphia Phillies (1916)

William Joseph Maharg (March 19, 1881 – November 20, 1953) was a professional boxer and baseball player.

Maharg appeared as a replacement player for the Tigers on May 18, 1912. He played two innings at third base and had two assists and no errors. He failed to reach base in his only at bat in the game.

On October 5, 1916, Maharg resurfaced in major-league baseball as an assistant trainer and driver with the Philadelphia Phillies. Maharg was given a chance to bat in the final game of the 1916 season. With the Braves ahead 4–1 in the 8th inning‚ Phillies manager Pat Moran put Maharg in as a pinch hitter. Maharg grounded out and then played left field before returning to his real duties as chauffeur for Phillies catcher Bill Killefer.

Maharg ended his two-game major-league career with a .000 batting average but a perfect 1.000 fielding percentage.

Maharg later gained notoriety in 1919 for his role in the Black Sox Scandal. Several White Sox players, including Eddie Cicotte, Chick Gandil, and Swede Risberg, conspired with Sleepy Bill Burns, a former big-league pitcher, to throw the World Series in exchange for $100,000. Maharg worked with Burns to find financing, approaching New York gambler Arnold Rothstein to raise the money for the players. Actor Richard Edson played the part of Maharg in John Sayles's 1988 film Eight Men Out. It has been incorrectly alleged, including in "Eight Men Out", the Eliot Asinof book about the scandal, that Maharg's real name was Graham, or Maharg spelled backwards; however, his father is clearly recorded in the 1900 Census as George Maharg, and appears also as "George Maharg" in Censuses prior to Billy Maharg's birth.

Maharg died in Philadelphia on November 20, 1953, and was interred at Holy Sepulchre Cemetery in Cheltenham Township, Pennsylvania.

=== Vincent Maney ===
Vincent Maney
- Shortstop
- Born: October 14, 1886; Batavia, New York, U.S.
- Died: March 13, 1952 (aged 65); Batavia, New York, U.S.
- Batted: Right Threw: Right

MLB debut
- May 18, 1912, for the Detroit Tigers

Last MLB appearance
- May 18, 1912, for the Detroit Tigers

MLB statistics
- Games played: 1
- At bats: 2
- Hits: 0

Teams
- Detroit Tigers (1912)

Stephen Vincent Maney (October 14, 1886 – March 13, 1952) played shortstop for the replacement Tigers on May 18, 1912. In four plate appearances, he had no hits, a walk, was hit by a pitch, and struck out twice. He compiled a .500 on-base percentage. Defensively, he had six chances, recording three putouts, two assists, and one error. He later wrote to his brother: "I played shortstop and had more fun than you can imagine. Of course it was a big defeat for us, but they paid us fifteen dollars for a couple of hours work and I was satisfied to say that I had played against the world champions."

Prior to the game, Maney was a worker at the Iroquois Iron Works in Philadelphia. He served in World War I and later worked as an insurance broker in Batavia, New York.

=== Jim McGarr ===
Jim McGarr
- Second baseman
- Born: November 9, 1888; Philadelphia, Pennsylvania, U.S.
- Died: July 21, 1981 (aged 92); Miami, Florida, U.S.
- Batted: Right Threw: Right

MLB debut
- May 18, 1912, for the Detroit Tigers

Last MLB appearance
- May 18, 1912, for the Detroit Tigers

MLB statistics
- Games played: 1
- At bats: 4
- Hits: 0

Teams
- Detroit Tigers (1912)

James Vincent McGarr (November 9, 1888 – July 21, 1981), nicknamed "Reds", played second base for the replacement Tigers on May 18, 1912. He struck out in all four plate appearances. Defensively, he had five chances, recording one putout, three assists, and one error. McGarr and fellow replacement player Dan McGarvey were friends who had also been teammates at Georgetown College. McGarr died in July 1981 in Miami, Florida at age 92. Having played during the first major-league players strike, he died during the 1981 Major League Baseball strike.

=== Dan McGarvey ===
Dan McGarvey
- Left fielder
- Born: December 2, 1887; Philadelphia, Pennsylvania, U.S.
- Died: August 18, 1945 (aged 57); Kecoughtan, Virginia, U.S.
- Batted: Right Threw: Unknown

MLB debut
- May 18, 1912, for the Detroit Tigers

Last MLB appearance
- May 18, 1912, for the Detroit Tigers

MLB statistics
- Games played: 1
- At bats: 3
- Hits: 0

Teams
- Detroit Tigers (1912)

Daniel John McGarvey (December 2, 1887 – August 18, 1945) played in left field for the Tigers' replacement team. He had no hits and a walk in five plate appearances. Defensively, he had three chances with one putout, one assist, and one error.

=== Jack Smith ===
Jack Smith
- Third baseman
- Born: August 8, 1893; Oswayo, Pennsylvania, U.S.
- Died: December 4, 1962 (aged 69); New York City, New York, U.S.
- Batted: Right Threw: Right

MLB debut
- May 18, 1912, for the Detroit Tigers

Last MLB appearance
- May 18, 1912, for the Detroit Tigers

MLB statistics
- Games played: 1
- At bats: 0
- Fielding percentage: 1.000

Teams
- Detroit Tigers (1912)

John Joseph Smith (born John Joseph Coffey, August 8, 1893 – December 4, 1962) played two innings at third base for the replacement Tigers on May 18, 1912. He had no plate appearances. Defensively, he had three chances with two putouts, one assist, and a double play. According to a publication by the Society for American Baseball Research (SABR), Smith was an alias used that day by John Coffee.

=== Joe Sugden ===
Joe Sugden
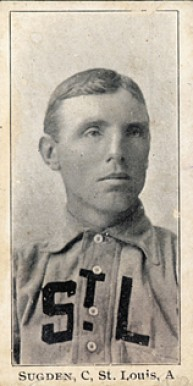
- Catcher
- Born: July 31, 1870; Philadelphia, Pennsylvania, U.S.
- Died: June 28, 1959 (aged 88); Philadelphia, Pennsylvania, U.S.
- Batted: Switch Threw: Right

MLB debut
- July 20, 1893, for the Pittsburgh Pirates

Last MLB appearance
- May 18, 1912, for the Detroit Tigers

MLB statistics
- Batting average: .255
- Home runs: 3
- Runs batted in: 283

Teams
- Pittsburgh Pirates (1893–1897); St. Louis Browns (1898); Cleveland Spiders (1899); Chicago White Sox (1901); St. Louis Browns (1902–1905); Detroit Tigers (1912)

Joseph Sugden (July 31, 1870 – June 28, 1959) was a professional baseball catcher. He played in the major leagues from 1893 to 1912 for the Pittsburgh Pirates, St. Louis Browns, Cleveland Spiders, Chicago White Sox, St. Louis Browns and Detroit Tigers. He was the only replacement player to have prior major-league experience. He was a coach for the Tigers during the 1912 season and was called back to active duty at age 41 for the May 18 game. He had a base hit in the game. In his later years, Sugden was a scout for the St. Louis Cardinals, a position he held until his death in 1959 at the age of 88.

=== Allan Travers ===
Allan Travers
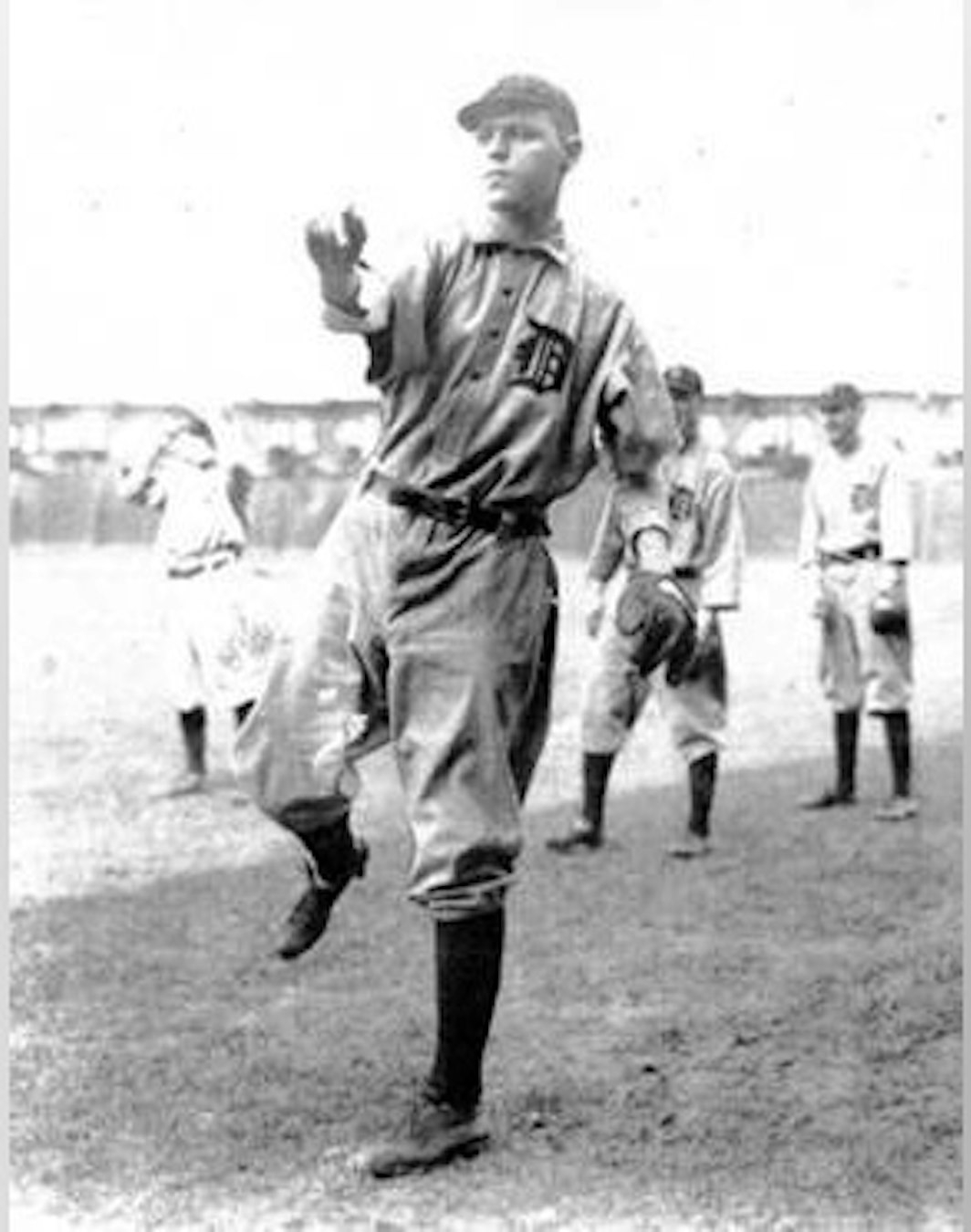
- Pitcher
- Born: May 7, 1892; Philadelphia, Pennsylvania, U.S.
- Died: April 19, 1968 (aged 75); Philadelphia, Pennsylvania, U.S.
- Batted: Right Threw: Right

MLB debut
- May 18, 1912, for the Detroit Tigers

Last MLB appearance
- May 18, 1912, for the Detroit Tigers

MLB statistics
- Win–loss record: 0–1
- Earned run average: 15.75
- Strikeouts: 1

Teams
- Detroit Tigers (1912)

Aloysius Joseph "Allan" Travers, SJ, also known as Aloysius Stanislaus Travers (May 7, 1892 – April 19, 1968), was the pitcher for the Tigers in the replacement game.

Detroit manager Hughie Jennings found Travers on a city street corner. Travers was 20 years old and a junior at Philadelphia's St. Joseph's College. He was a violinist in the student orchestra and had never pitched a game in his life. He had even been unable to make the school's varsity baseball team. Instead, Travers served as the team's assistant manager, preparing game summaries for the school annual.

Yet on May 18, 1912, Travers became a starting pitcher in a major-league baseball game, walking out onto the mound in front of 15,000 Philadelphia fans at Shibe Park to face the two-time defending World Series champions. Over the next few hours Travers pitched to some of the best players of the era, including Frank "Home Run" Baker, Eddie Collins, and Stuffy McInnis.

Under these unlikely circumstances, Travers pitched a complete game, allowing 26 hits, 24 runs, 14 earned runs, seven walks and one strikeout. Travers faced 50 batters through eight innings and was tagged with the loss in the 24–2 decision. His 24 runs allowed remains the American League record for a complete game, and his 23 earned runs allowed are the most in a single game in major-league history; this performance broke the previous record of 20, which was shared by Nixey Callahan of the Chicago Orphans (against the Philadelphia Phillies on September 6, 1900) and George LeClair of the Pittsburgh Rebels (against the Indianapolis Hoosiers on August 16, 1914).

Travers (0–1) never played again in the major leagues, preserving his career ERA at 15.75.

Many years later, Travers told his story in an interview with sportswriter Red Smith. He recalled being asked to round up "as many fellows as I could find" to play for the Tigers. Travers claims to have gone to the corner of 23rd and Columbia in Philadelphia where "a bunch of fellows were standing around the corner." That "bunch of fellows" became the Detroit Tigers for a day.

When asked about his performance on the mound, Travers told Smith that he threw "slow curves" that day, because the A's were not used to them, and because manager Hughie Jennings told Travers not to throw any fastballs as he "was afraid I might get killed."

Travers later entered the Society of Jesus, also known as the Jesuits, and was ordained as a Catholic priest in 1926. He is the only priest to have played major league baseball. Travers taught at St. Francis Xavier High School in Manhattan and was later named Dean of Men at St. Joseph College. From 1943 to 1968, he taught Spanish and religion at Saint Joseph's Preparatory School in Philadelphia.

Travers lived in Philadelphia, Pennsylvania, for almost all of his life. He died at Misericordia Hospital in 1968 at age 75.

=== Hap Ward ===
Hap Ward
- Outfielder
- Born: November 15, 1885; Leesburg, New Jersey, U.S.
- Died: September 13, 1979 (aged 93); Elmer, New Jersey, U.S.
- Batted: Switch Threw: Right

MLB debut
- May 18, 1912, for the Detroit Tigers

Last MLB appearance
- May 18, 1912, for the Detroit Tigers

MLB statistics
- Batting average: .000
- Home runs: 0
- Runs batted in: 0

Teams
- Detroit Tigers (1912)

Joseph Nichols "Hap" Ward (November 15, 1885 – September 13, 1979) played in right field for the replacement Tigers on May 18, 1912. He was born on November 15, 1885, in Leesburg, New Jersey. He had no hits in three plate appearances, struck out twice, and was caught stealing once. Defensively, he had two putouts and no errors in two chances. He died at age 93 in 1979 in Elmer, New Jersey.
