= Narrows, Georgia =

Unincorporated community in Georgia, U.S.

Coordinates: 34°28′16″N 83°28′52″W

Narrows is an unincorporated community in Banks County, Georgia, United States. It is located on Georgia State Route 105, approximately four miles southeast of Baldwin.

Narrows was the birthplace of baseball player Ty Cobb. A roadside sign describes the original location of the cabin in which the Cobb family lived and where Ty was born.

In 1864, Narrows was the site of the Battle of the Narrows, between Confederate and Union forces, which resulted in a Confederate victory.
