= Ty Cobb =

American baseball player (1886–1961)

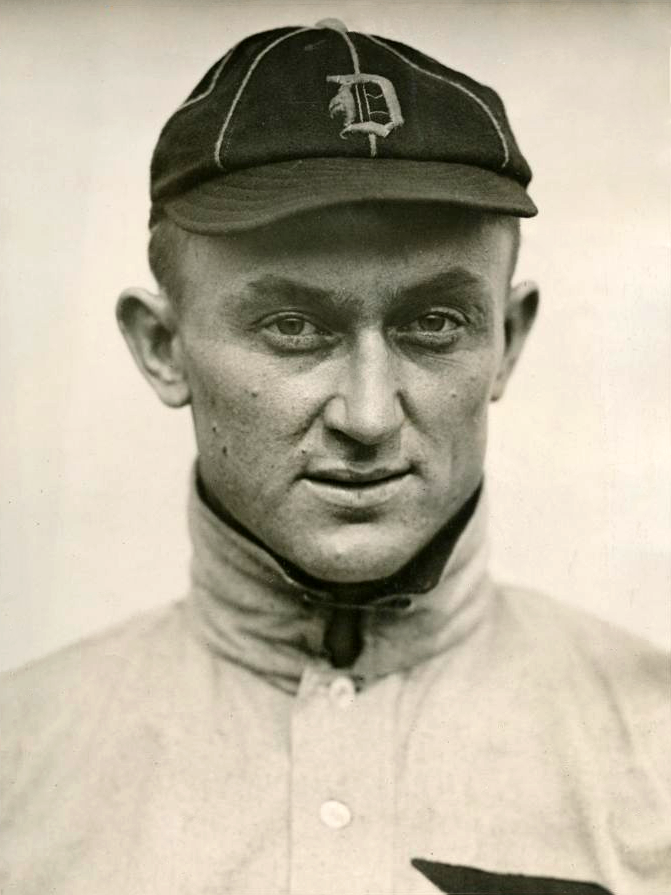
- Cobb with the Detroit Tigers in 1913
- Center fielder / Manager
- Born: December 18, 1886; Narrows, Georgia, U.S.
- Died: July 17, 1961 (aged 74); Atlanta, Georgia, U.S.
- Batted: Left Threw: Right

MLB debut
- August 30, 1905, for the Detroit Tigers

Last MLB appearance
- September 11, 1928, for the Philadelphia Athletics

MLB statistics
- Batting average: .366
- Hits: 4,189
- Home runs: 117
- Runs batted in: 1,944
- Stolen bases: 897
- Managerial record: 479–444
- Winning %: .519
- Stats at Baseball Reference
- Managerial record at Baseball Reference

Teams
- As player: Detroit Tigers (1905–1926); Philadelphia Athletics (1927–1928); As manager: Detroit Tigers (1921–1926)

Career highlights and awards
- AL MVP (1911); Triple Crown (1909); 12× AL batting champion (1907–1915, 1917–1919); AL home run leader (1909); 4× AL RBI leader (1907–1909, 1911); 6× AL stolen base leader (1907, 1909, 1911, 1915–1917); Name honored by the Tigers; Major League Baseball All-Century Team

Member of the National

Baseball Hall of Fame
- Induction: 1936
- Vote: 98.2% (first ballot)

Tyrus Raymond Cobb (December 18, 1886 – July 17, 1961), nicknamed "the Georgia Peach", was an American professional baseball center fielder. A native of rural Narrows, Georgia, Cobb played 24 seasons in Major League Baseball (MLB). He spent 22 years with the Detroit Tigers and served as the team's player-manager for the last six, and he finished his career with the Philadelphia Athletics. In 1936, Cobb received the most votes of any player on the inaugural ballot for the National Baseball Hall of Fame, receiving 222 out of a possible 226 votes (98.2%); no other player received a higher percentage of votes until Tom Seaver in 1992. In 1999, The Sporting News ranked Cobb third on its list of "Baseball's 100 Greatest Players."

Cobb is credited with setting 90 MLB records throughout his career. Cobb won 12 batting titles, more than any other player. During his 24-year career, he hit .300 in a record 23 consecutive seasons, with the exception being his abbreviated two month debut in 1905. He also hit .400 in three different seasons, a record he shares with three other players. Cobb has more five-hit games (14) than any other player in major league history. He also holds the career record for stealing home (54 times) and for stealing second base, third base, and home in succession (4 times). His combined total of 4,065 runs scored and runs batted in (after adjusting for home runs) is still the highest ever produced by any major league player. Cobb also ranks first in games played by an outfielder in major league history (2,934). He retained many other records for almost a half century or more, including most career games played (3,035) and at bats (11,429 or 11,434 depending on source) until 1974 as well as the modern record for most career stolen bases (892) until 1977. He also had the most career hits until 1985 (4,189 or 4,191, depending on source) and most career runs until 2001. His .366 or .367 (depending on source) career batting average ranked as the highest-ever recorded up until 2024, when MLB added Negro Leagues players to official historical statistics. Some sources still list Cobb as the all-time average leader

Cobb's legacy, which includes a large college scholarship fund for Georgia residents that he endowed with early investments in Coca-Cola and General Motors, has been somewhat tarnished by allegations of racism and violence. These primarily stem from a couple of mostly discredited biographies released following his death. Cobb's reputation as a violent man was exaggerated by his first biographer, sportswriter Al Stump, whose stories about Cobb have been proven to be sensationalized and largely fictional. While he was known for often violent conflicts, he spoke favorably about black players joining the Major Leagues and was a well-known philanthropist.

== Early life ==
Tyrus Raymond Cobb was born on December 18, 1886, in Narrows, Georgia, a small, unincorporated rural community of farmers. He was the first of three children born to William Herschel Cobb (1863–1905) and Amanda Chitwood Cobb (1871–1936). Cobb's father was a state senator.

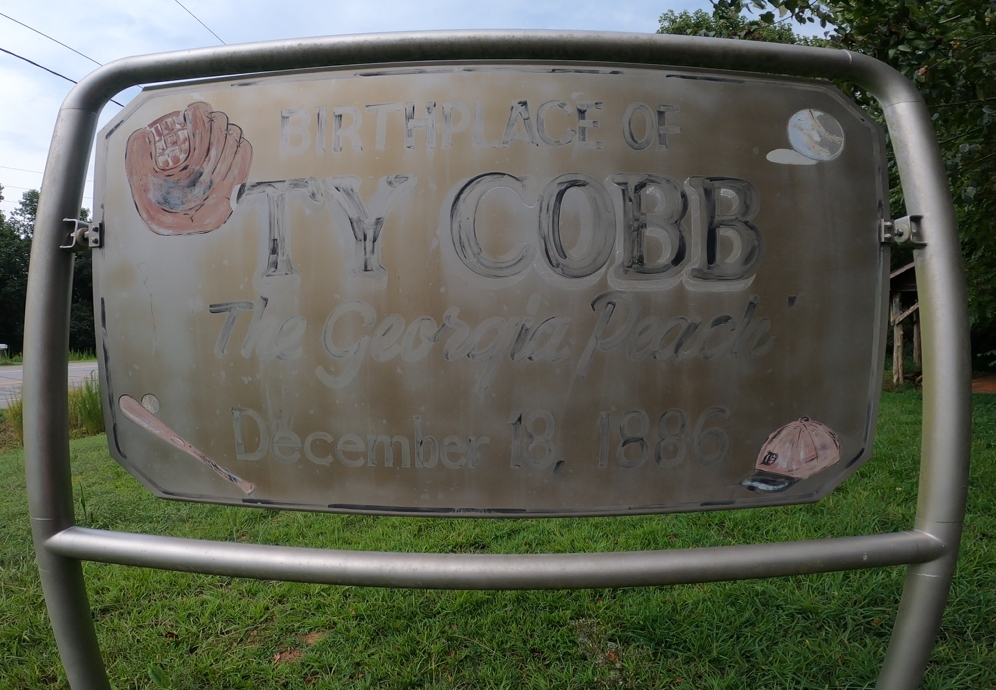
Faded sign at Narrows, Georgia, celebrating it as the birthplace of Ty Cobb, "The Georgia Peach"

When he was still an infant, his parents moved to the nearby town of Royston, where he grew up. By most accounts, he became fascinated with baseball as a child, and decided that he wanted to go professional one day; his father was vehemently opposed to this idea, but by his teenage years, he was trying out for area teams. He played his first years in organized baseball for the Royston Rompers, the semi-pro Royston Reds, and the Augusta Tourists of the South Atlantic League, who released him after only two days. He then tried out for the Anniston, Alabama-based Anniston Steelers of the semipro Tennessee–Alabama League, with his father's stern admonition ringing in his ears: "Don't come home a failure!" After joining the Steelers for a monthly salary of $50, Cobb promoted himself by sending several postcards written about his talents under different aliases to Grantland Rice, the Atlanta Journal sports editor. Eventually, Rice wrote a small note in the Journal that a "young fellow named Cobb seems to be showing an unusual lot of talent." After about three months, Cobb returned to the Tourists and finished the season hitting .237 in 35 games. While with the Tourists he was mentored and coached by George Leidy, who emphasized pinpoint bunting and aggression on the basepaths. In August 1905, the management of the Tourists sold Cobb to the American League's Detroit Tigers for $750 (equivalent to $26,875 in 2025).

On August 8, 1905, Cobb's mother, Amanda, fatally shot his father, William, with a pistol that William had purchased for her. Court records indicate that William Cobb had suspected Amanda of infidelity and was sneaking past his own bedroom window to catch her in the act. She saw the silhouette of what she presumed to be an intruder and, acting in self-defense, shot and killed her husband. Amanda Cobb was charged with murder and released on a $7,000 recognizance bond. She was acquitted on March 31, 1906. Ty Cobb later attributed his ferocious play to his father, saying, "I did it for my father. He never got to see me play ... but I knew he was watching me, and I never let him down."

Cobb was initiated into Freemasonry in 1907, and he was a member of the Scottish Rite and completed the 32nd degree in 1912.

In 1911, Cobb moved to Detroit's architecturally significant and now historically protected Woodbridge neighborhood, from which he would walk with his dogs to the ballpark prior to games. The Victorian duplex in which Cobb lived still stands.

== Professional career ==
=== Detroit Tigers (1905–1926) ===
==== Early years ====
Three weeks after his mother killed his father, Cobb debuted in center field for the Detroit Tigers. On August 30, 1905, in his first major league at bat, he hit a double off Jack Chesbro of the New York Highlanders. Chesbro had won 41 games the previous season. Cobb was 18 years old at the time, the youngest player in the league by almost a year. Although he hit only .240 in 41 games, he signed a $1,500 contract to play for the Tigers in 1906.

As a rookie, Cobb was subject to severe hazing by his veteran teammates, who were jealous of the young prospect. The players smashed his homemade bats, nailed his cleats in the clubhouse, doused his clothes before tying knots in them, and verbally abused him. Cobb later attributed his hostile temperament to this experience: "These old-timers turned me into a snarling wildcat." Tigers manager Hughie Jennings, who took the helm in 1907, later acknowledged that Cobb was targeted for abuse by veteran players, some of whom sought to force him off the team. "I let this go for a while because I wanted to satisfy myself that Cobb has as much guts as I thought in the very beginning," Jennings recalled. "Well, he proved it to me, and I told the other players to let him alone. He is going to be a great baseball player and I won't allow him to be driven off this club."

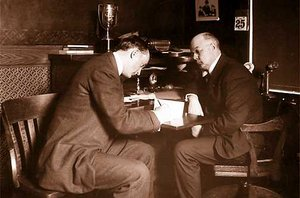
Cobb ends a 1908 holdout by signing a $5,000 contract (equivalent to $179,170 today)

Within a year, Cobb emerged as the Tigers' regular center fielder and hit .316 in 98 games in 1906, setting a record for the highest batting average (minimum 310 plate appearances) for a 19-year-old (bested by Mel Ott's .322 average in 124 games for the 1928 New York Giants). He never hit below that mark again. After being moved to right field, he would lead the Tigers to three consecutive American League pennants in 1907, 1908 and 1909. Detroit would lose each World Series (to the Cubs twice and then the Pirates), however, and Cobb's postseason numbers were in sum notably below his career standard. It was his later contention that his youth at the time played a factor in this. In his remaining nineteen seasons, Cobb did not get another opportunity to play on a pennant-winner and thus in a World Series.

In a game in 1907, Cobb reached first and then stole second, third and home. a feat he accomplished four times during his career, still an MLB record. He finished the 1907 season with a league-leading .350 batting average, 212 hits, 49 steals and 119 runs batted in (RBI). At age 20, he was the youngest player to win a batting championship and held this record until 1955, when fellow Detroit Tiger Al Kaline won the batting title at twelve days younger than Cobb had been. Reflecting on his career in 1930, two years after retiring, he told Grantland Rice, "The biggest thrill I ever got came in a game against the Athletics in 1907 [on September 30]... The Athletics had us beaten, with Rube Waddell pitching. They were two runs ahead in the 9th inning, when I happened to hit a home run that tied the score. This game went 17 innings to a tie, and a few days later, we clinched our first pennant. You can understand what it meant for a 20-year-old country boy to hit a home run off the great Rube, in a pennant-winning game with two outs in the ninth." In the 1907 World Series, after a suspended tie in Game One, the Tigers were outclassed and swept by the Chicago Cubs, with Cobb battling a lackluster .200.

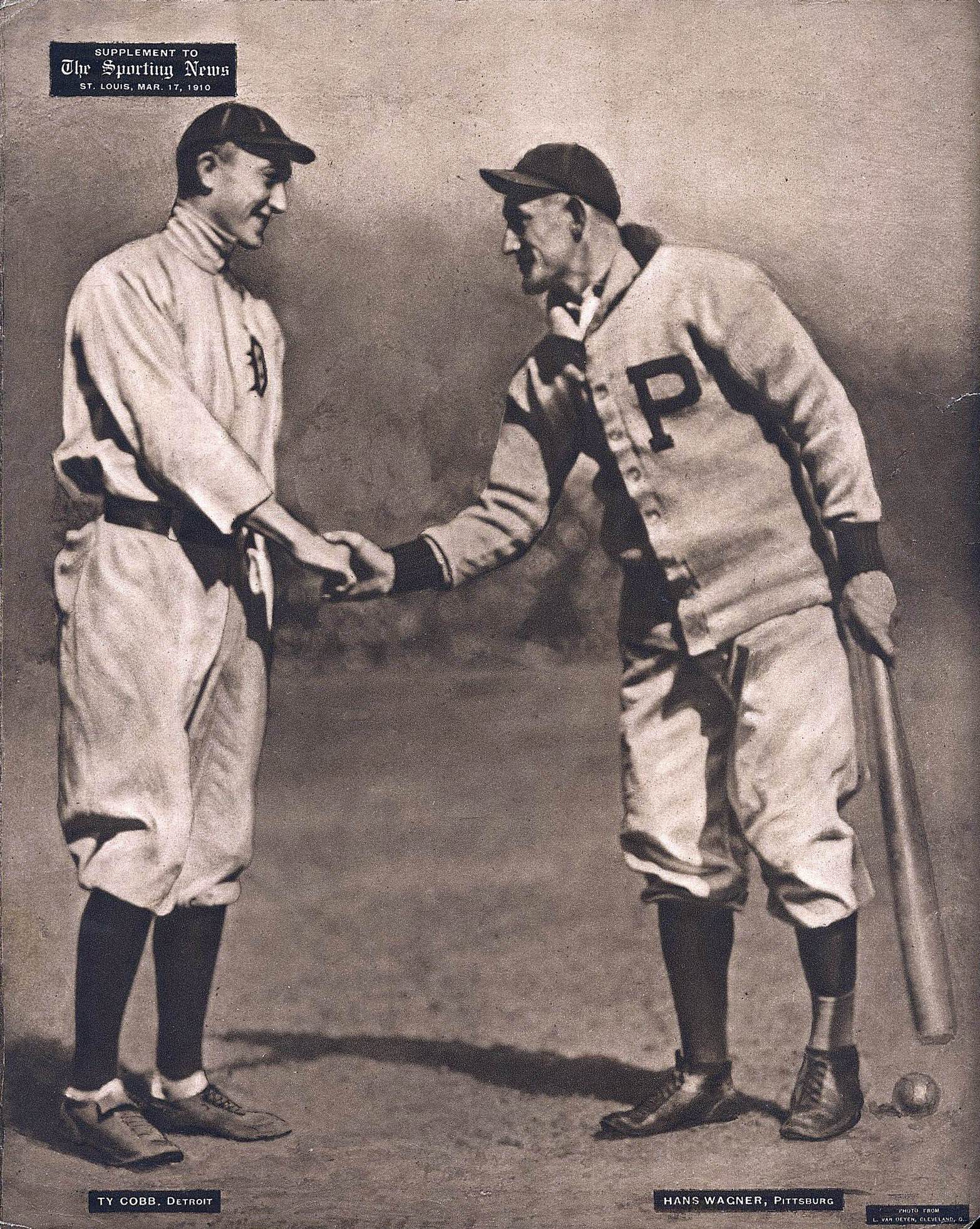
Cobb (left) and Honus Wagner, his National League rival for greatest position player in the game, during the 1909 Detroit-Pittsburgh World Series

Despite great success on the field, Cobb began a habit of attracting controversy off it. An early incident, as described in Smithsonian, alleged, "In 1907 during spring training in Augusta, Georgia, a black groundskeeper named Bungy Cummings, whom Cobb had known for years, attempted to shake Cobb's hand or pat him on the shoulder." The "overly familiar greeting infuriated" Cobb, who attacked Cummings. When Cummings' wife tried to defend him, Cobb allegedly choked her. The assault was only stopped when catcher Charles "Boss" Schmidt knocked Cobb out. However, aside from Schmidt's statement to the press, no other corroborating witnesses to the assault on Cummings ever came forward and Cummings himself never made a public comment about it. Author Charles Leerhsen speculates that the assault on Cummings and his wife never occurred and that it was a total fabrication by Schmidt. Cobb had spent the previous year defending himself on several occasions from assaults by Schmidt, with Schmidt often coming out of nowhere to blindside Cobb. On that day, several reporters did see Cummings, who appeared to be "partially under the influence of liquor," approach Cobb and shout "Hello, Carrie!" (the meaning of which is unknown) and go in for a hug. Cobb then pushed him away, which was the last interaction that anyone saw between Cobb and Cummings. Shortly thereafter, hearing a fight, several reporters came running and found Cobb and Schmidt wrestling on the ground. When the fight was broken up and Cobb had walked away, Schmidt remained behind and told the reporters that he saw Cobb assaulting Cummings and his wife and had intervened. Leerhsen speculates that this was just another one of Schmidt's assaults on Cobb and that once discovered, Schmidt made up a story that made him sound like he had assaulted Cobb for a noble purpose. In 1908, Cobb attacked a black laborer in Detroit who complained when Cobb stepped into freshly poured asphalt; Cobb was found guilty of battery, but the sentence was suspended.

In September 1907, Cobb began a relationship with The Coca-Cola Company that lasted the remainder of his life. By the time he died, he held over 20,000 shares of stock and owned bottling plants in Santa Maria, California, Twin Falls, Idaho, and Bend, Oregon. He was also a celebrity spokesman for the product. In the offseason between 1907 and 1908, Cobb negotiated with Clemson Agricultural College of South Carolina, offering to coach baseball there "for $250 a month, provided that he did not sign with Detroit that season." This did not come to pass, however.

The following season, the Tigers finished one game ahead of the Chicago White Sox for the pennant. Cobb again won the batting title with a .324 average. (It would be the low mark of his twelve titles, as that season saw league batting averages dip to a low for the dead-ball era. For the next eleven seasons, Cobb posted a yearly average above his career mark of .367) In the World Series, he performed well, batting a team-high .368 and starring in a Game 3 win. Nonetheless, Detroit suffered another lopsided series loss to the Cubs. In August 1908, Cobb married Charlotte ("Charlie") Marion Lombard, the daughter of prominent Augustan Roswell Lombard. In the offseason, the couple lived on her father's Augusta estate, The Oaks, until they moved into their own house on Williams Street in November 1913.

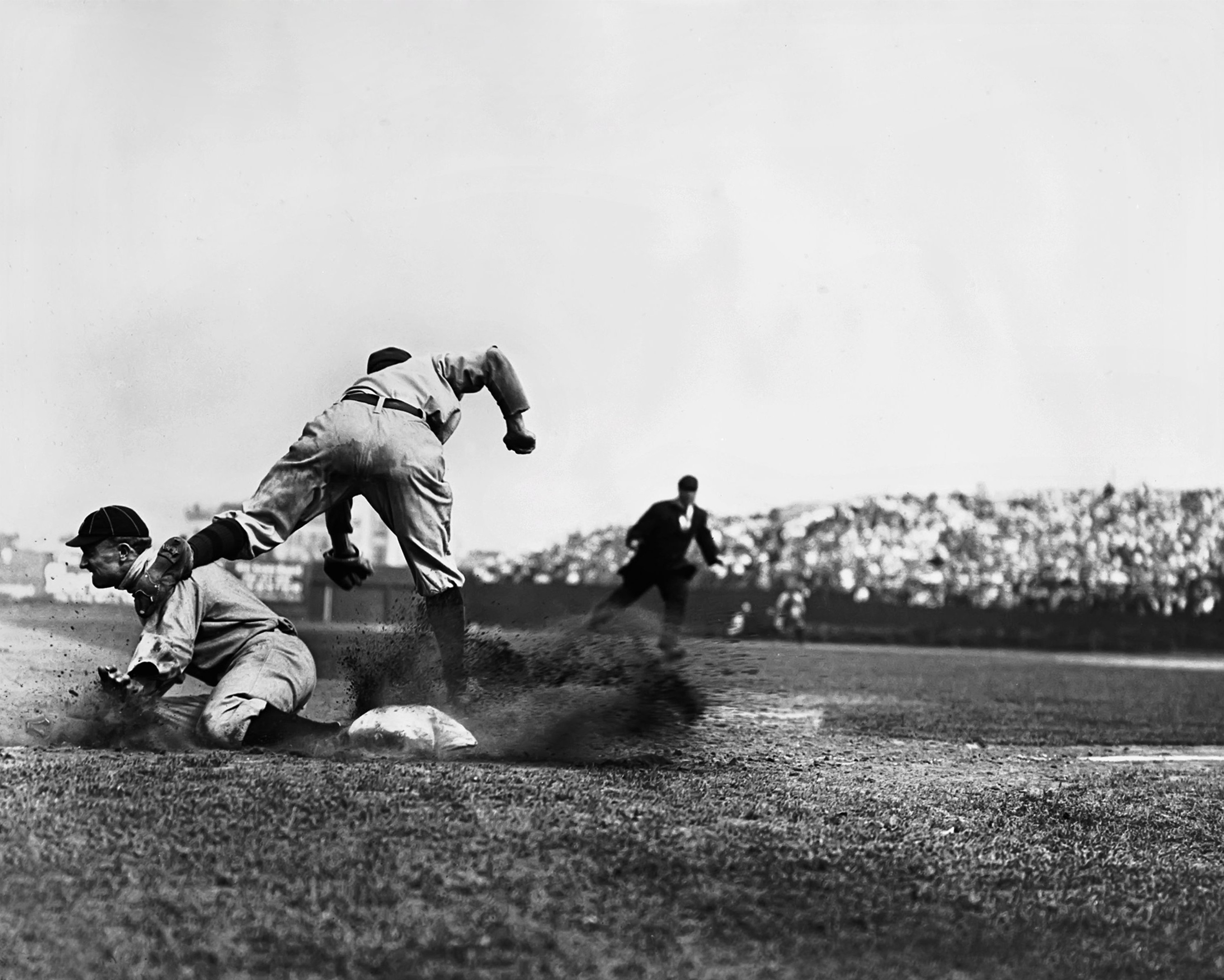
Charles M. Conlon's famed picture of Cobb stealing third base during the 1909 season

The Tigers won a third straight AL pennant in 1909, winning a then-franchise high 98 games. The World Series was a matchup with the Pittsburgh Pirates, led by Honus Wagner. It would turn out to be Cobb's last. He stole home in the second game, igniting a key three-run rally, and also plated a team-high six RBIs for the series. Despite those highlights, he finished with a subpar .231 batting average, as the Tigers fell in seven games. Although the postseason ended in another setback, Cobb won the [Major League Baseball] Triple Crown that year by hitting .377 with 107 RBI and nine home runs, all inside the park (thus becoming the only player of the modern era to lead his league in home runs without hitting a ball over the fence).

In the same season, Charles M. Conlon snapped the famous photograph of a grimacing Cobb sliding into third base amid a cloud of dirt, visually capturing the grit and ferocity of his playing style.

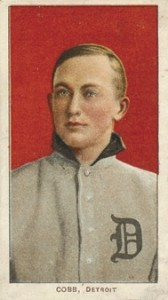
T-206 Ty Cobb baseball card

=== 1910: Chalmers Award controversy ===
Going into the final days of the 1910 season, Cobb had a .004 lead over Nap Lajoie for the American League batting title. The prize for the winner of the title was a Chalmers automobile. With the pennant long clinched by the Athletics, Cobb sat out the final two games to preserve his average. On the last day, Lajoie hit safely eight times in a doubleheader, but six of those hits were bunt singles. Later, it was rumored that the opposing manager had instructed his third baseman to play back to tip the batting race in Lajoie's favor. Still, Cobb was credited at the end of the season with a barely higher average. In the controversy that followed, AL president Ban Johnson was forced to arbitrate the matter. He declared Cobb the rightful winner of the title, though car company president Hugh Chalmers chose to award automobiles to both players. (It was later claimed by a researcher in the 1970s that one Detroit game had apparently been counted twice, in which case if corrected Cobb actually finished behind Lajoie. Major League Baseball nevertheless recognizes Cobb as the winner, with the original stats having been grandfathered in.)

=== 1911–1914 ===
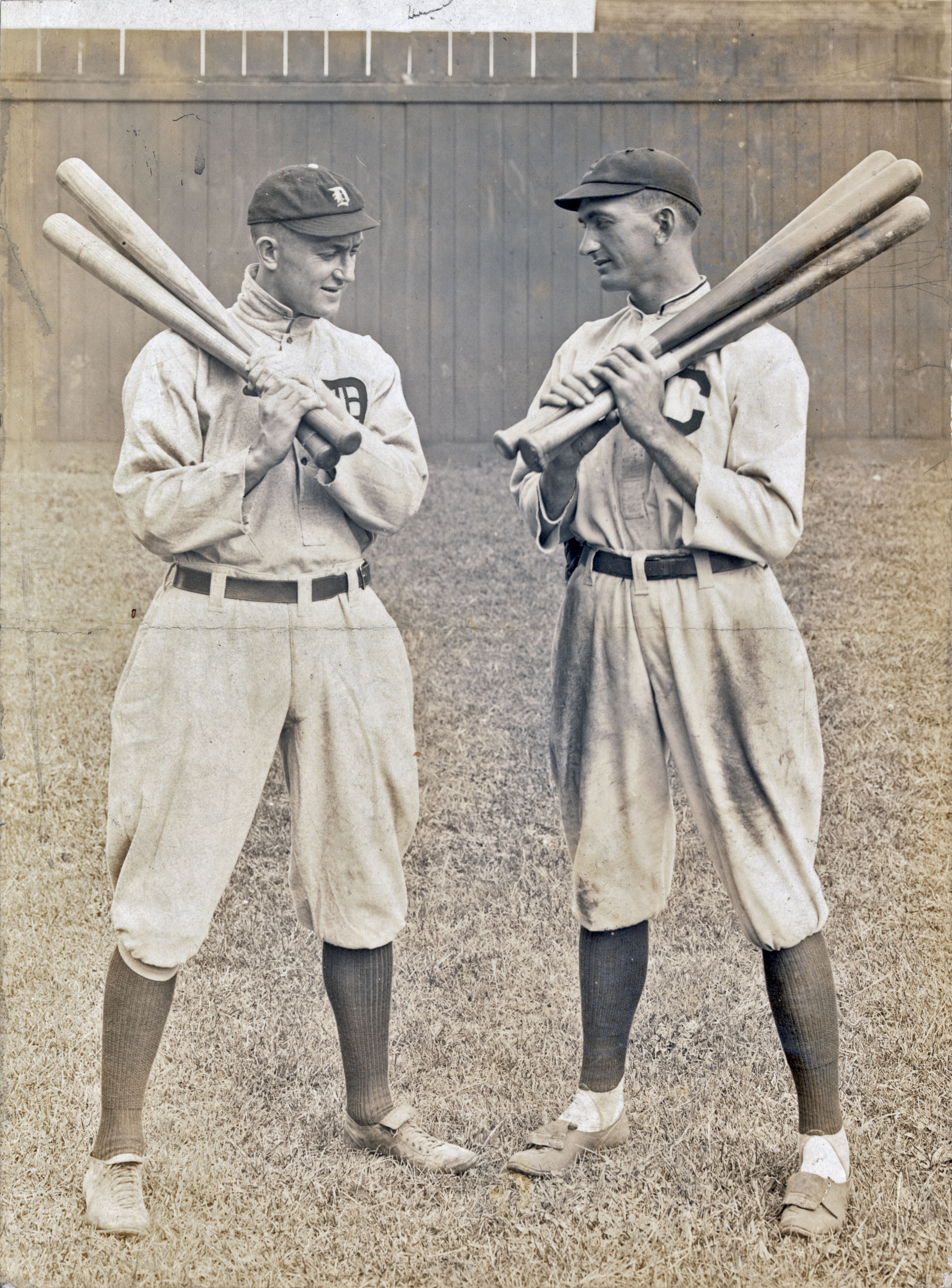
Cobb and "Shoeless" Joe Jackson, a top American League rival, in Cleveland (1913)

Cobb regarded baseball as "something like a war, a struggle for survival..." Future Tiger second baseman Charlie Gehringer said. "Every time at bat for him was a crusade." Baseball historian John Thorn said in the book Legends of the Fall, "He is testament to how far you can get simply through will. ... Cobb was pursued by demons."

Cobb was having a tremendous year in 1911, which included a personal high 40-game hitting streak. Still, "Shoeless" Joe Jackson led him by .009 points in the batting race late in the season. Cobb's Tigers were set to square off in a long series against Jackson's Cleveland Naps. Fellow Southerners Cobb and Jackson were friendly on and off the field. Cobb now sought to use that friendship to his advantage. He ignored Jackson whenever he went to speak to him. When Jackson persisted, Cobb snapped back angrily, making the impressionable Jackson puzzle over what he could have done to enrage Cobb. Anecdotally, at least, the mind games contributed to a slump that saw Jackson's final average fall to.408, twelve points lower than the .420 Cobb posted to set a modern era record (which was tied by George Sisler in 1922 and surpassed two years later by Rogers Hornsby with a.424 mark). Cobb still owns the distinction of being the only player in the dead-ball era (1901-19) to surpass .400 twice, repeating the feat the next year, with only Jackson achieving it even once.

I often tried plays that looked recklessly daring, maybe even silly. But I never tried anything foolish when a game was at stake, only when we were far ahead or far behind. I did it to study how the other team reacted, filing away in my mind any observations for future use.

— Ty Cobb in The New York Times

Cobb dominated the AL statistically that year, his best, leading in numerous categories, including 248 hits, 147 runs scored, 127 RBI, 83 stolen bases, 47 doubles, 24 triples and a hefty .621 slugging percentage. Cobb hit also eight home runs, finishing second in that category to Frank Baker, who hit eleven. He was awarded another Chalmers car for being voted the AL MVP by the Baseball Writers' Association of America. He also returned to playing centerfield full-time that season, the position he would occupy for most of the rest of his career.

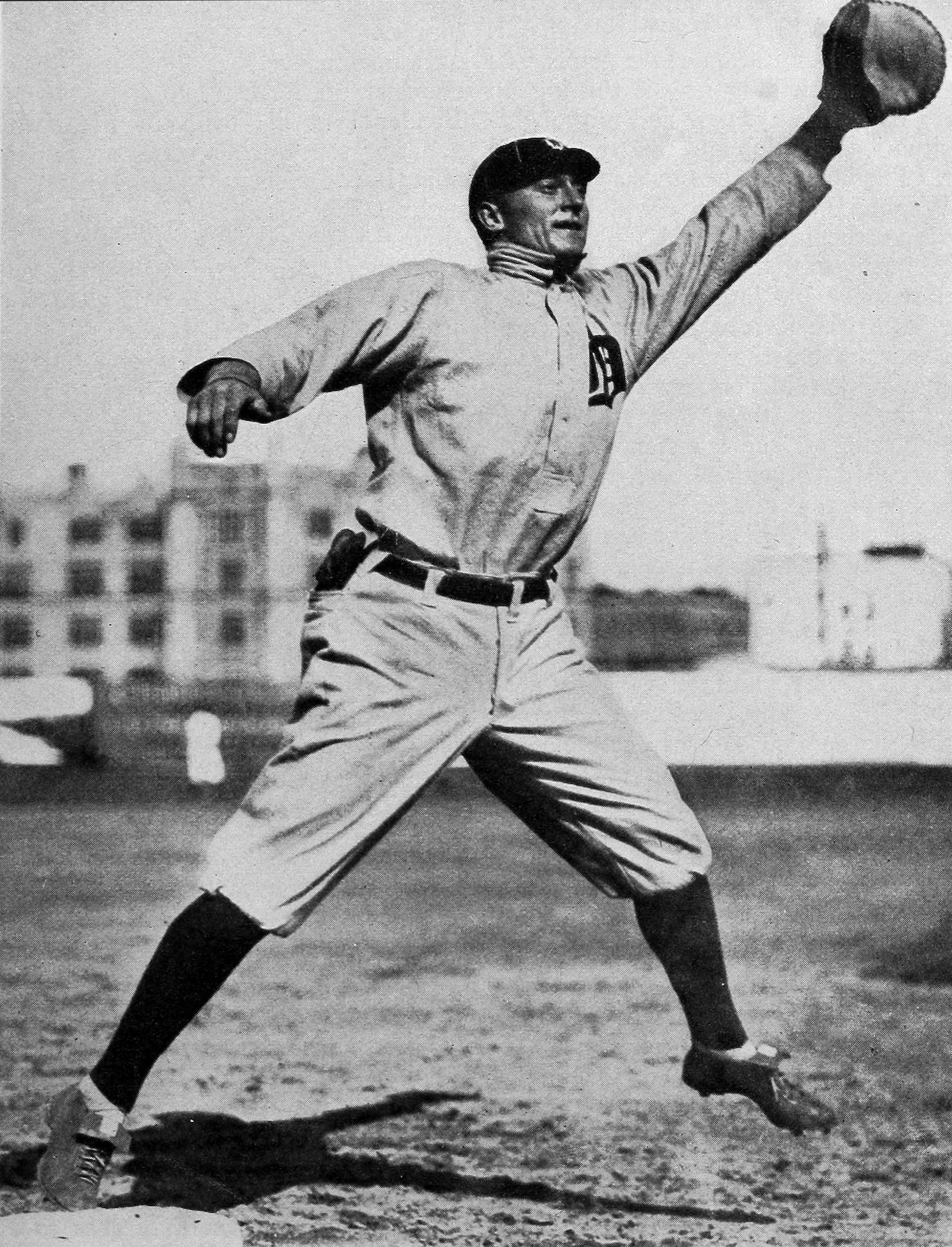
Cobb in 1911

On May 12, 1911, playing against the New York Highlanders, he scored from first base on a single to right field, then scored another run from second base on a wild pitch. In the seventh inning, he tied the game with a two-run double. The Highlanders catcher vehemently argued the safe call at second base with the umpire, going on at such length that the other Highlanders infielders gathered nearby to watch. Realizing that no one on the Highlanders had called time, Cobb strolled unobserved to third base and then casually walked towards home plate as if to get a better view of the argument. He then suddenly broke into a run and slid into home plate for the eventual winning run. It was improvised performances like this that led Branch Rickey to remark later that Cobb "had brains in his feet."

Spurred by Cobb's play, the Tigers shot to a dizzying start of 21-2 that year. Though their pace cooled considerably after that, they still held first place as late as early August. But they faded badly in the stretch and finished a distant second to the Philadelphia Athletics.

Describing his gameplay strategy in 1930, Cobb said, "My system was all offense. I believed in putting up a mental hazard for the other fellow. If we were five or six runs ahead, I'd try some wild play, such as going from first to home on a single. This helped to make the other side hurry the play in a close game later on. I worked out all the angles I could think of, to keep them guessing and hurrying." In the same interview, he talked about having noticed a throwing tendency of first baseman Hal Chase but having to wait two full years until the opportunity came to exploit it. By unexpectedly altering his own baserunning tendencies, he was able to surprise Chase and score the winning run of the game in question.

On May 15, 1912, controversy returned in the form of his most notorious altercation. Cobb assaulted a heckler, Claude Lucker (often misspelled as Lueker), in the stands in New York's Hilltop Park where the Tigers were playing the Highlanders. Lucker, described by baseball historian Frank Russo as "a Tammany Hall lackey and two-bit punk," often berated Cobb when Detroit visited New York. In this game, the two traded insults through the first couple of innings. Cobb at one point went to the Highlander dugout to look for the Highlanders' owner to try to have Lucker ejected from the game, but his search went in vain. He also sought the police to intervene, but they refused. The situation escalated when Lucker allegedly called Cobb a "half-nigger." Cobb, in his discussion of the incident in the Holmes biography, avoided such explicit words but alluded to Lucker's epithet by saying he was "reflecting on my mother's color and morals." He went on to state that he warned Highlander manager Harry Wolverton that if something was not done about the man, there would be trouble. No action was taken. At the end of the sixth inning, after being challenged by teammates Sam Crawford and Jim Delahanty to do something himself, Cobb climbed into the stands and attacked Lucker, who it turned out was handicapped (he had lost all of one hand and three fingers on his other hand in an industrial accident). Some onlookers shouted at him to stop because the man had no hands, to which Cobb reportedly retorted, "I don't care if he's got no feet!" According to Russo, the crowd cheered Cobb on in the fight. Virtually unheard of nowadays, attacking fans was not so rare in the early 20th century era. Other notable baseball stars who assaulted hecklers included Babe Ruth, Cy Young, Rube Waddell, Kid Gleason, Sherry Magee, and Fred Clarke.

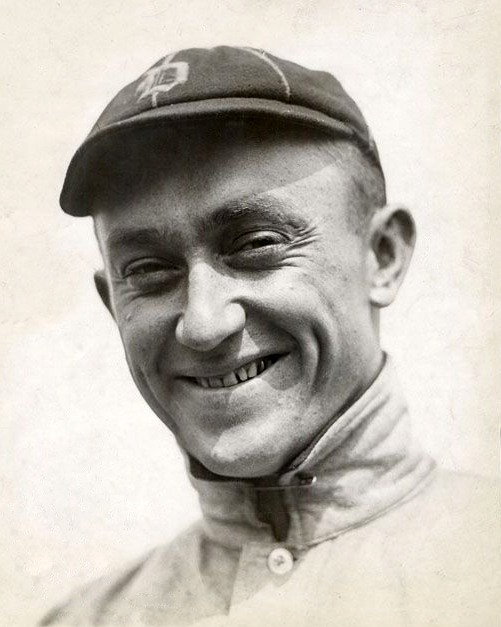
Cobb in 1916

The league summarily suspended Cobb over the incident. His teammates, backing him, however, went on strike to protest the suspension and lack of protection for players from abusive fans, prior to the May 18 game in Philadelphia. For that single game, Detroit fielded a roster of replacement players made up of hastily recruited college and sandlot players plus two Tiger coaches and lost 24–2, thereby setting some of Major League Baseball's modern-era (post-1900) negative records, notably the 26 hits in a nine-inning game allowed by pitcher Allan Travers, who lasted the distance for the sport's most unlikely complete games ever. The pre-1901 record for the most hits and runs given up in a game is held by the Cleveland Blues' Dave Rowe. Primarily an outfielder, Rowe pitched a complete game on July 24, 1882, giving up 35 runs on 29 hits. The current post-1900 record for most hits in a nine-inning game is 31, set in 1992 by the Milwaukee Brewers against Toronto; however, the Blue Jays used six pitchers.

The strike ended when Cobb urged his teammates to return to the field. According to him, this incident led to the formation of a players' union, the "Ballplayers' Fraternity" (formally, the Fraternity of Professional Baseball Players of America), an early precursor of what is now called the Major League Baseball Players Association, which garnered some concessions from the owners.

During his career, Cobb was involved in numerous other physical encounters, both on and off the field. Cobb and umpire Billy Evans once arranged to settle their in-game differences through fisticuffs under the grandstand afterward. Members of both teams were spectators, and broke up the scuffle after Cobb had knocked Evans down, pinned him and began choking him. In 1909, Cobb was arrested for assault over an incident that occurred in a Cleveland hotel. Cobb got into an argument with the elevator operator around 2 a.m. when the man refused to take him to the floor where some of his teammates were having a card game. The elevator operator stated that he could only take Cobb to the floor where his room was. As the argument escalated, a night watchman approached and he and Cobb subsequently got into a physical confrontation. During the scuffle, Cobb took out a penknife and slashed the watchman across the hand. Cobb later claimed that the watchman had pried his finger into Cobb's left eye and Cobb was worried his sight was going to be ruined. The fight finally ended when the watchman produced a gun and struck Cobb several times in the head, knocking him out. Cobb later pled guilty to simple assault and paid a $100 fine. This incident has often been retold with the elevator operator and the watchman both being black. However, recent scholarship has shown that all parties involved were white.

On August 13, 1912, the Tigers were once again to play the New York Highlanders at Hilltop Park, Cobb reported that he and his wife were driving to a train station in Syracuse that was to transport him to the game when three intoxicated men had stopped him on the way. Cobb got out of the car to confront the men, who demanded money and instigated a fight, with Cobb defending himself from one of the men by punching him in the chin as another fled the scene. After Cobb was grabbed by the neck by the third man, the man pulled a knife and stabbed him in the back before he forced him away and returned to his car and continued driving to the station. Cobb refused to speak further of the incident. He would go on to hit 2–3 with two singles and a run scored in the game the next day.

For the 1912 season, Cobb again batted over .400 at .409, but Detroit sank to sixth place in the American League standings, by far a new low in the years following their pennant wins.

In 1913, Cobb signed a contract worth $12,000 for the six-month season (equivalent to $390,909 in 2025), making him likely the first baseball player in history to be paid a five-figure salary. This occurred in the same year when Cobb allegedly grew pessimistic and was quoted as saying: "It seems I am a burden to the Detroit club, as a trespasser of its rules. If that be the case, let Mr. Navin put a price on me and I'll take a chance on being able to negotiate my own release. I don't think I shall ever play ball again. This is positively my last statement in this matter." This attributed statement was first published in an April 19, 1913, edition of the Los Angeles Herald. (Cobb did not play that day as the Tigers won 4–0 against the St. Louis Browns.) A second straight sixth-place campaign by Detroit probably contributed to his negativity.

In still another off-field incident in June 1914, Cobb pled guilty to disturbing the peace for pulling a revolver during an argument at a Detroit butcher shop. He was fined $50 (equivalent to $1,607 in 2025).

=== 1915–1921 ===
In 1915, Cobb set the single-season record for stolen bases with 96, which stood until Dodger Maury Wills broke it in 1962. That year, he also won his record ninth consecutive batting title, hitting .369. The Tigers surged back to win 100 games in 1915, the most during Cobb's career, but finished a close second to the Boston Red Sox. It was his nearest miss of a pennant and another shot at a World Series.

During 1917 spring training, Cobb showed up late for a Dallas spring training doubleheader against the New York Giants because of a golf outing. Several of the Giants, including Buck Herzog, called him names from the bench. Cobb retaliated by spiking Herzog during the second game, prompting a bench-clearing brawl in which Cobb ground Herzog's face in the dirt. The Dallas Police Department had to help stop the brawl, and Cobb was thrown out of the game. Both teams were staying at the Oriental Hotel, and at dinner that evening, Herzog walked up to Cobb and challenged him to a fight. The two met an hour later in Cobb's room, where the Tiger outfielder had prepared for the fight by moving furniture out of the way and pouring water on the floor. Cobb's leather-soled shoes enabled him to get better footing than Herzog, who wore tennis shoes. The fight lasted for thirty minutes, over the course of which Cobb knocked down Herzog about six times while Herzog only knocked Cobb down once. The scuffle left Herzog's face bloodied and his eyes nearly shut. With Herzog vowing revenge, Cobb skipped the rest of the exhibition series against the Giants, heading to Cincinnati to train with the Reds, who were managed by Cobb's friend Christy Mathewson. However, Cobb later expressed the deepest respect for Herzog because of the way the infielder had conducted himself in the fight.

In 1917, Cobb hit in 35 consecutive games, still the only player ever with two hitting streaks of 35 or more in his career (after his 40-game streak in 1911). He had six hitting streaks of at least 20 games in his career, second only to Pete Rose's eight. That year would also be the last he dominated the American League statistically, after having done so for nearly a decade. He led in hits, doubles, triples, slugging pct. and recaptured the batting title after a one-year interruption. He also led in stolen bases for the last time with 55. Thereafter, his steals dropped to 34 in 1918 and then below 30 for the rest of his career, as his speed and daring had diminished due to the physical toll playing had taken on him (particularly his legs from sliding on the rough diaamond ground) and he was no longer as imposing a threat on the basepaths as he had been. Cobb would go on to notch his 11th and 12th batting titles the next two years. But after that, he never led the league in a major statistical category agan, though he maintained a high average and hit .401 in 1922.

Also in 1917, Cobb starred in the motion picture Somewhere in Georgia for a sum of $25,000 plus expenses (equivalent to approximately $628,000 today). Based on a story by sports columnist Grantland Rice, the film casts Cobb as "himself," a small-town Georgia bank clerk with a talent for baseball. Broadway critic Ward Morehouse called the movie "absolutely the worst flicker I ever saw, pure hokum."

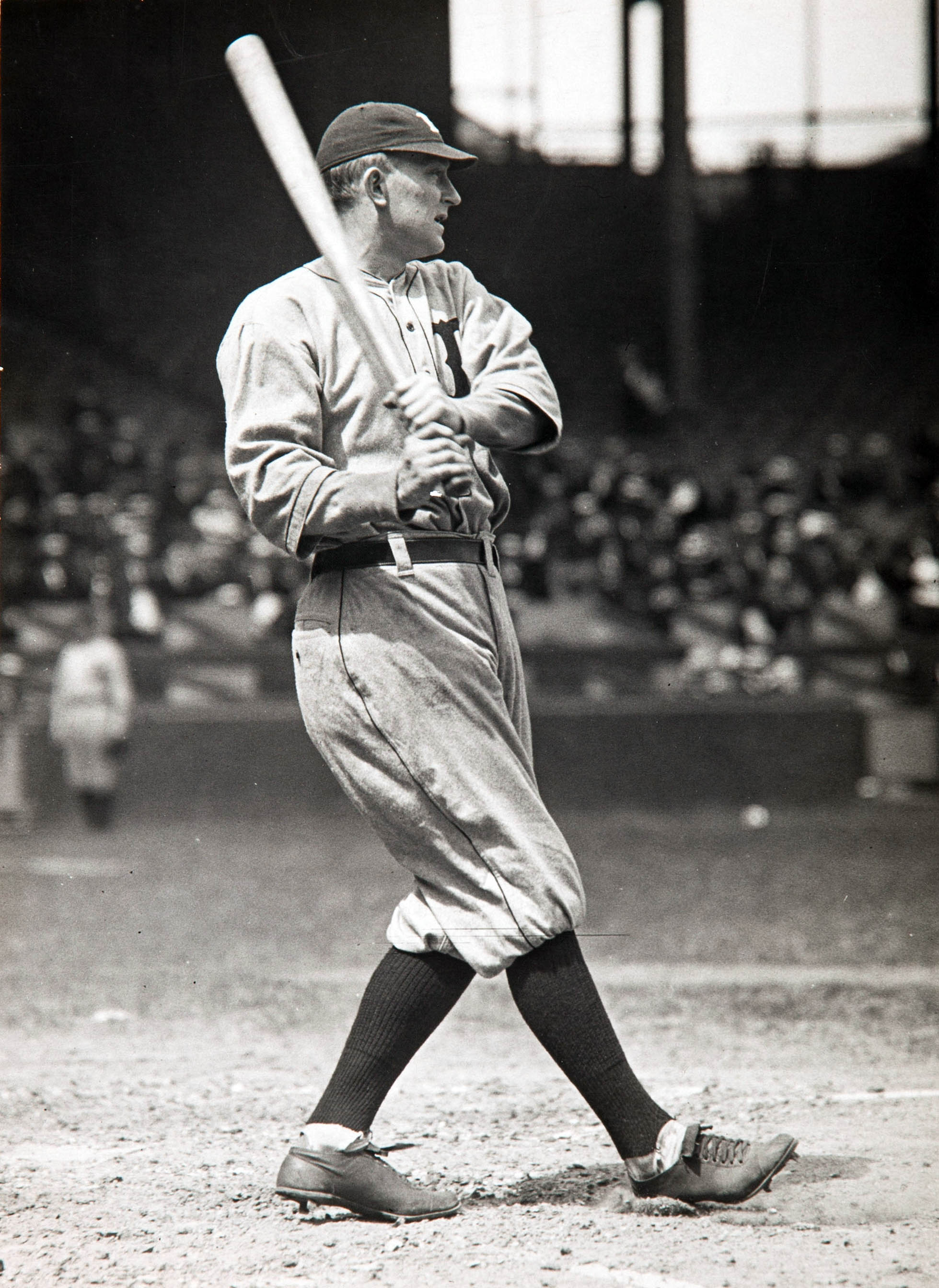
Cobb circa 1918

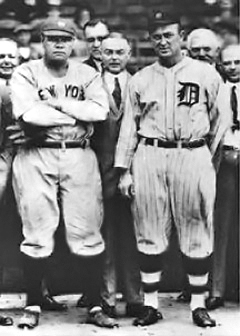
Babe Ruth (left) and Ty Cobb in 1920

In October 1918, Cobb enlisted in the Chemical Corps branch of the United States Army and was sent to the Allied Expeditionary Forces headquarters in Chaumont, France. He served approximately 67 days overseas before being honorably discharged and returning to the United States. He was given the rank of captain underneath the command of Major Branch Rickey, the president of the St. Louis Cardinals. Other baseball players serving in this unit included Captain Christy Mathewson and Lieutenant George Sisler. All of these men were assigned to the Gas and Flame Division, where they trained soldiers in preparation for chemical attacks by exposing them to gas chambers in a controlled environment, training which eventually was believed to cause Mathewson to contract the tuberculosis that killed him on the eve of the 1925 World Series.

On August 19, 1921, in the second game of a doubleheader against Elmer Myers of the Boston Red Sox, Cobb collected his 3,000th hit. Aged 34 at the time, he is still the youngest player to reach that milestone, and in the fewest at-bats (8,093).

By 1920, Babe Ruth, sold to the renamed New York Yankees from the Boston Red Sox, was establishing himself as an unprecedented power hitter in what would be a new era of baseball. When Cobb's Tigers showed up in New York to play the Yankees for the first time that season, writers billed it as a showdown between stars of clashing styles. (The comparison was not quite equable, since Cobb was past his prime as a player while Ruth was just entering his.) Ruth hit two homers, a triple, and two singles during the series, compared to Cobb's two hits of a double and a single.

As Ruth's popularity grew in the '20s, Cobb became at least outwardly hostile toward him. The Babe had emerged as a threat to his style of play, which now appeared out-dated and he was unable to display at the level of his prime. Possibly, what riled him most was that despite Ruth's apparent disregard for his physical condition and traditional baseball, he was an overwhelming success who brought fans to the ballparks in record numbers to see him challenge his own slugging records.

On May 5, 1925, his frustration apparently came to a head. Cobb told a reporter before the game that day that, for the first time in his career, he was going to try to hit home runs, saying he wanted to show that he could hit home runs but simply had chosen not to. He was as good as his word, belting out three homers in going 6 for 6 at the plate, along with two singles and a double. The 16 total bases set a AL record which was not surpassed until May 8, 2012, when Josh Hamilton of the Texas Rangers hit four home runs and a double for a total of 18 bases. The next day, Cobb walloped two more home runs. A single his first time up had given him nine consecutive hits over three games, while his five homers in two games tied a record set by Cap Anson of the old Chicago NL team in 1884. By the end of the series Cobb had gone 12 for 19 with 29 total bases. Afterwards, he reverted to his old playing style (though in truth he may also have realized he was not going to beat Ruth at his own game). When asked in 1930 by Grantland Rice to name the best hitter he'd ever seen, Cobb answered frankly, "You can't beat the Babe. Ruth is one of the few who can take a terrific swing and still meet the ball solidly. His timing is perfect. [No one has] the combined power and eye of Ruth." By then, he had mellowed on the rivalry, and the two later became friends in retirement. In his autobiography, published shortly before his death, Cobb revealed how proud he was of being the top vote-getter in the initial Hall-of-Fame balloting in 1936, besting even Ruth among the other inductees.

== Player-manager career ==
=== Detroit Tigers (1921–1926) ===
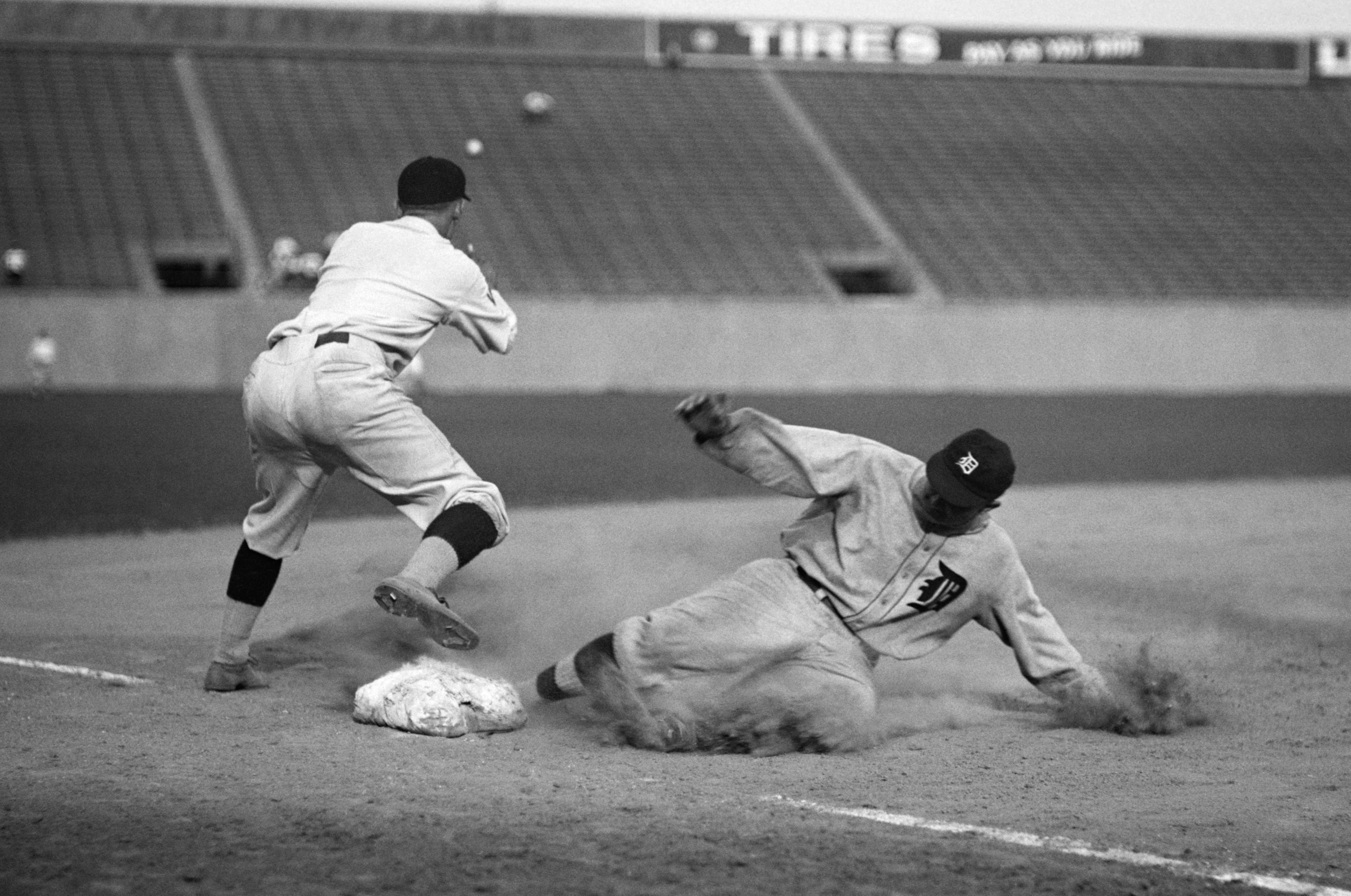
Cobb slides into third base for a triple against the Washington Senators at Griffith Stadium, August 16, 1924

Tigers owner Frank Navin tapped Cobb to take over for Hughie Jennings as manager for the 1921 season, a deal he signed on his 34th birthday for $32,500 (equivalent to approximately $586,637 in today's terms). The signing came as somewhat of a surprise to the baseball world. Although Cobb was a legendary player, he was regarded as disliked by many in the baseball community, even by fellow teammates.

The closest Cobb came to winning a pennant as manager was in 1924, when the Tigers finished in third place, six games behind the pennant-winning Washington Senators. The Tigers also finished third in 1922, 16 games behind the Yankees, and a high of second in 1923. Cobb blamed his overall unspectacular managerial record (479 wins to 444 losses) principally on Navin, who not wanting to lay out the money, had passed up several quality players Cobb sought to add to the team. In fact, the thrifty Navin had saved money by hiring Cobb for double duty as player and manager.

In 1922, Cobb tied a batting record set by Wee Willie Keeler, with four five-hit games in a season. This has since been matched by Stan Musial, Tony Gwynn and Ichiro Suzuki. On May 10, 1924, Cobb was honored at ceremonies before a game in Washington, D.C., by more than 100 dignitaries and legislators. He received 21 books, one for each of his years in professional baseball. The gift was a testament to the well-known fact he was an avid reader of books.

At the end of 1925, Cobb had become locked in another tight batting title race (six years after winning his last), this time with one of his teammates and players, Harry Heilmann. In a doubleheader against the St. Louis Browns on October 4, 1925, Heilmann got six hits to lead the Tigers to a sweep of the doubleheader and beat Cobb for the batting crown, .393 to .389. Cobb and Browns player-manager George Sisler each pitched in the final game, Cobb pitching a perfect inning.

==== Managerial record ====
Team	Year	Regular season					Postseason			
Team	Year	Games	Won	Lost	Win %	Finish	Won	Lost	Win %	Result
DET	1921	153	71	82	.464	6th in AL	–	–	–	
DET	1922	154	79	75	.513	3rd in AL	–	–	–	
DET	1923	154	83	71	.539	2nd in AL	–	–	–	
DET	1924	154	86	68	.558	3rd in AL	–	–	–	
DET	1925	154	81	73	.526	4th in AL	–	–	–	
DET	1926	154	79	75	.513	6th in AL	–	–	–	
Total		923	479	444	.519		0	0	–	

=== Philadelphia Athletics (1927–1928) ===
Cobb announced his retirement after a 22-year career as a Tiger in November 1926, and headed home to Augusta, Georgia. Shortly thereafter, Tris Speaker also retired as player-manager of the Cleveland Indians. The retirement of two great players at the same time sparked interest, and it turned out that the two were coerced into retirement because of allegations of game-fixing brought about by Dutch Leonard, a former pitcher managed by Cobb.

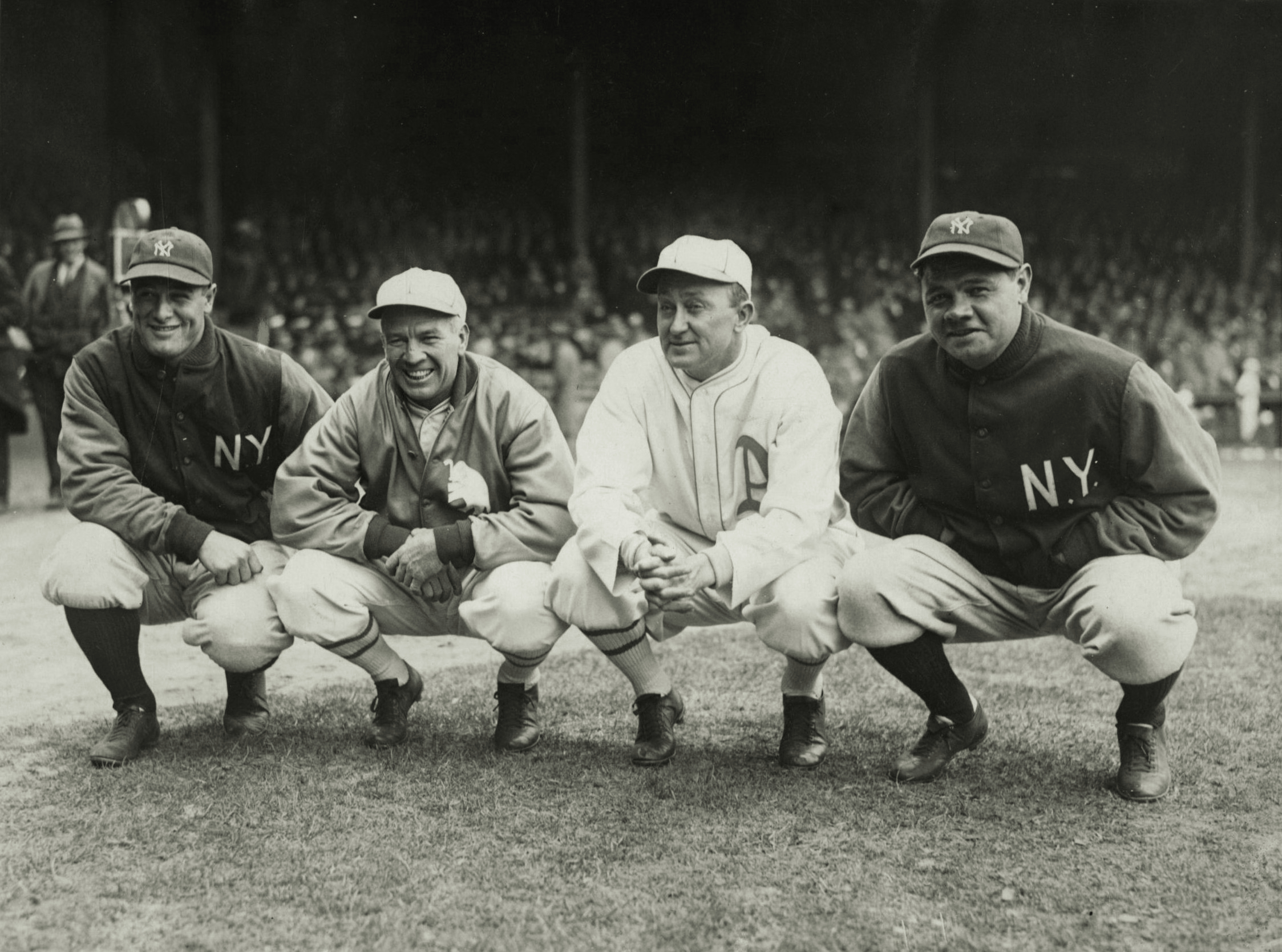
Future Hall of Famers Lou Gehrig, Tris Speaker, Cobb, and Babe Ruth, 1928

Leonard accused former pitcher and outfielder Smoky Joe Wood and Cobb of betting on a Tigers–Indians game played in Detroit on September 25, 1919, in which they allegedly orchestrated a Tigers victory to win the bet and for the team a postseason share of money for finishing in third place. (They actually finished fourth.) Leonard claimed proof existed in letters written to him by Cobb and Wood. Commissioner Kenesaw Mountain Landis held a secret hearing with Cobb, Speaker and Wood. A second secret meeting among the AL directors led to the unpublicized resignations of Cobb and Speaker; however, rumors of the scandal led Judge Landis to hold additional hearings in which Leonard refused to participate. Cobb and Wood admitted to writing the letters, but claimed that a horse-racing bet was involved and that Leonard's accusations were in retaliation for Cobb's having released him from the Tigers, demoting him to the minor leagues. Speaker denied any wrongdoing.

On January 27, 1927, Judge Landis cleared Cobb and Speaker of any wrongdoing because of Leonard's refusal to appear at the hearings. Landis allowed both Cobb and Speaker to return to their original teams, but each team let them know they were free agents who could sign with any club they wanted. Speaker signed with the Washington Senators for 1927, and Cobb with the Philadelphia Athletics. Speaker then joined Cobb in Philadelphia for the 1928 season. Cobb said he had come back only to seek vindication and say he left baseball on his terms.

Cobb played regularly in 1927 for a Philadelphia team that finished a distant second to the [1927 New York Yankees season|110–44 New York Yankees, often regarded as the greatest team ever.]]. He returned to Detroit on May 10 and doubled in his first plate appearance. On July 18, Cobb became the first player ever to reach the milestone of 4.000 hits 4,000-hit club when he doubled off former teammate Sam Gibson, fittingly at Navin Field. He would be joned in the 4.000 hit club finally six decades later by Pete Rose, who then broke Cobb's all-time record of 4,191 hits in 1985 (although it took Rose over 2400 at bats to eclipse Cobb).

Cobb returned for the 1928 season but played less frequently due to his age and physical limitations and the blossoming abilities of the young A's, who were in a pennant race with the Yankees. On September 3, he pinch-hit in the ninth inning of the first game of a doubleheader against the Senators and doubled off Bump Hadley for his last career hit. His final two at-bats came on September 11 against the Yankees, when he popped out off Hank Johnson and grounded out to shortstop Mark Koenig.

== Retirement ==
Cobb announced his retirement September 11, 1928, effective the end of the season. In his career, he batted an average of.300 or higher in 23 consecutive seasons (his only season under .300 being his abbreviated debut in 1905), a major league record that is unlikely to be broken, and won a major league record 12 batting titles, with a record-tying three seasons over .400. Despite not being labeled a slugger, he led the AL in RBI's four times, rapped 295 triples, won the 1909 AL Triple Crown, and led the AL in slugging percentage eight times in his 11 seasons from 1907 to 1917, being the only player other than Ruth and Rogers Hornsby ever to lead in that category in six consecutive years.

Fleet afoot and an aggressive base runner, Cobb led the American League 6 times in stolen bases, retiring with a modern record of 897 steals, 256 ahead of his closest competitor, and a record that stood for 49 years. He also led the league in runs scored five times, and set a Major League record of 2,245 runs that stood for 73 years.

An aggressive fielder, Cobb retired with 271 errors as an outfielder, 14th on the all-time list as of 2025, which stands as a record for 20th century on players.

== Post-playing career ==
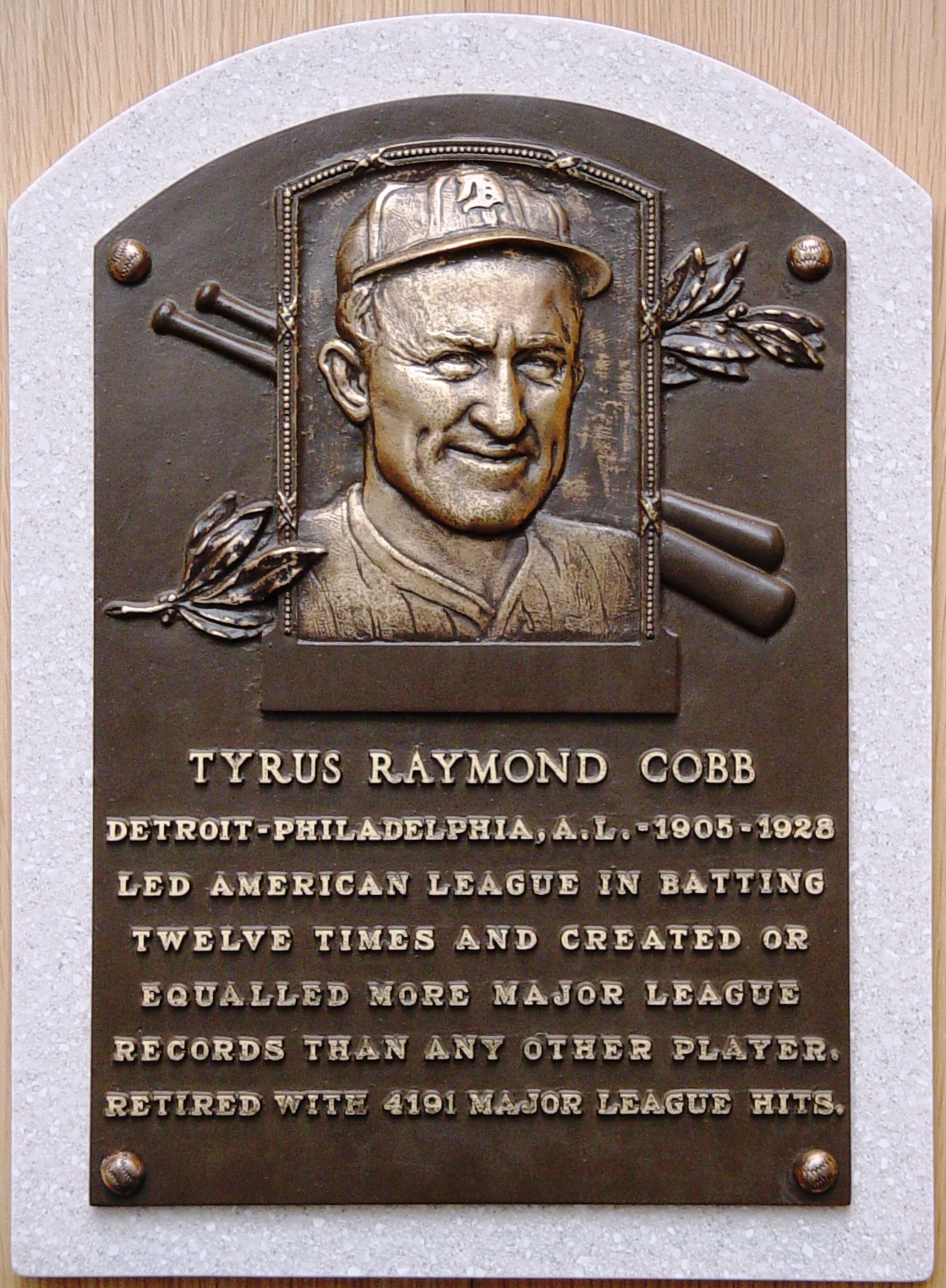
Cobb's plaque in the Baseball Hall of Fame

Cobb retired a wealthy and successful man. He toured Europe with his family, went to Scotland for some time and then returned to his farm in Georgia. He spent his retirement pursuing his off-season avocations of hunting, golfing, polo, and fishing. His other pastime was trading stocks and bonds, increasing his immense personal wealth. He was a major stockholder in the Coca-Cola Corporation, which by itself would have made him wealthy.

In the winter of 1930, Cobb moved into a Spanish ranch estate on Spencer Lane in the affluent town of Atherton located south of San Francisco, California, on the San Francisco Peninsula. At the same time, his wife Charlie filed the first of several divorce suits but withdrew the suit shortly thereafter. The couple eventually divorced in 1947 after 39 years of marriage, the last few years of which Cobb's wife lived in nearby Menlo Park. The couple had three sons and two daughters: Tyrus Raymond Jr, Shirley Marion, Herschel Roswell, James Howell, and Beverly.

Cobb's children found him to be demanding, yet also capable of kindness and extreme warmth. He expected his sons to be exceptional athletes in general and baseball players in particular. Tyrus Raymond, Jr. flunked out of Princeton (where he had played on the varsity tennis team), much to his father's dismay. The elder Cobb traveled to the Princeton campus and beat his son with a whip to ensure against future academic failure. Tyrus Raymond, Jr. then entered Yale University and became captain of the tennis team while improving his academics, but was then arrested twice in 1930 for drunkenness and left Yale without graduating. Cobb helped his son deal with his pending legal problems, but then permanently broke off with him. Even though Tyrus Raymond, Jr. finally reformed and eventually earned an M.D. from the Medical College of South Carolina and practiced obstetrics and gynecology in Dublin, Georgia, until his death at 42 on September 9, 1952, from a brain tumor, his father remained distant.

In February 1936, when the first Baseball Hall of Fame election results were announced, Cobb had been named on 222 of 226 ballots, outdistancing Babe Ruth, Honus Wagner, Christy Mathewson, and Walter Johnson, the only others to earn the necessary 75% of votes to be elected that first year. His 98.2% stood as the record until Tom Seaver received 98.8% of the vote in 1992. Those results show that although Cobb was often portrayed as disliked by many people, the baseball writers greatly respected the way he had played the game and all he had accomplished. In 1998, Sporting News ranked him as third on their list of 100 Greatest Baseball Players.

Of major league stars of the 1940s and 1950s, Cobb had positive things to say about Stan Musial, Phil Rizzuto, and Jackie Robinson, but relatively few others. Even so, he was known to help out young players. He was instrumental in helping Joe DiMaggio negotiate his rookie contract with the New York Yankees.

According to sportswriter Grantland Rice, he and Cobb were returning from the Masters golf tournament in the late 1940s and stopped at a Greenville, South Carolina, liquor store. Cobb noticed that the man behind the counter was "Shoeless" Joe Jackson, who had been banned from baseball almost 30 years earlier following the Black Sox scandal. Jackson did not appear to recognize him, and after making his purchase an incredulous Cobb asked, "Don't you know me, Joe?" "Sure, I know you, Ty" replied Jackson, "but I wasn't sure you wanted to know me. A lot of them don't."

Cobb was mentioned in the poem "Line-Up for Yesterday" by Ogden Nash:

Line-Up for Yesterday

C is for Cobb,
Who grew spikes and not corn,
And made all the basemen
Wish they weren't born.

— Ogden Nash, Sport magazine (January 1949)

=== Later life ===
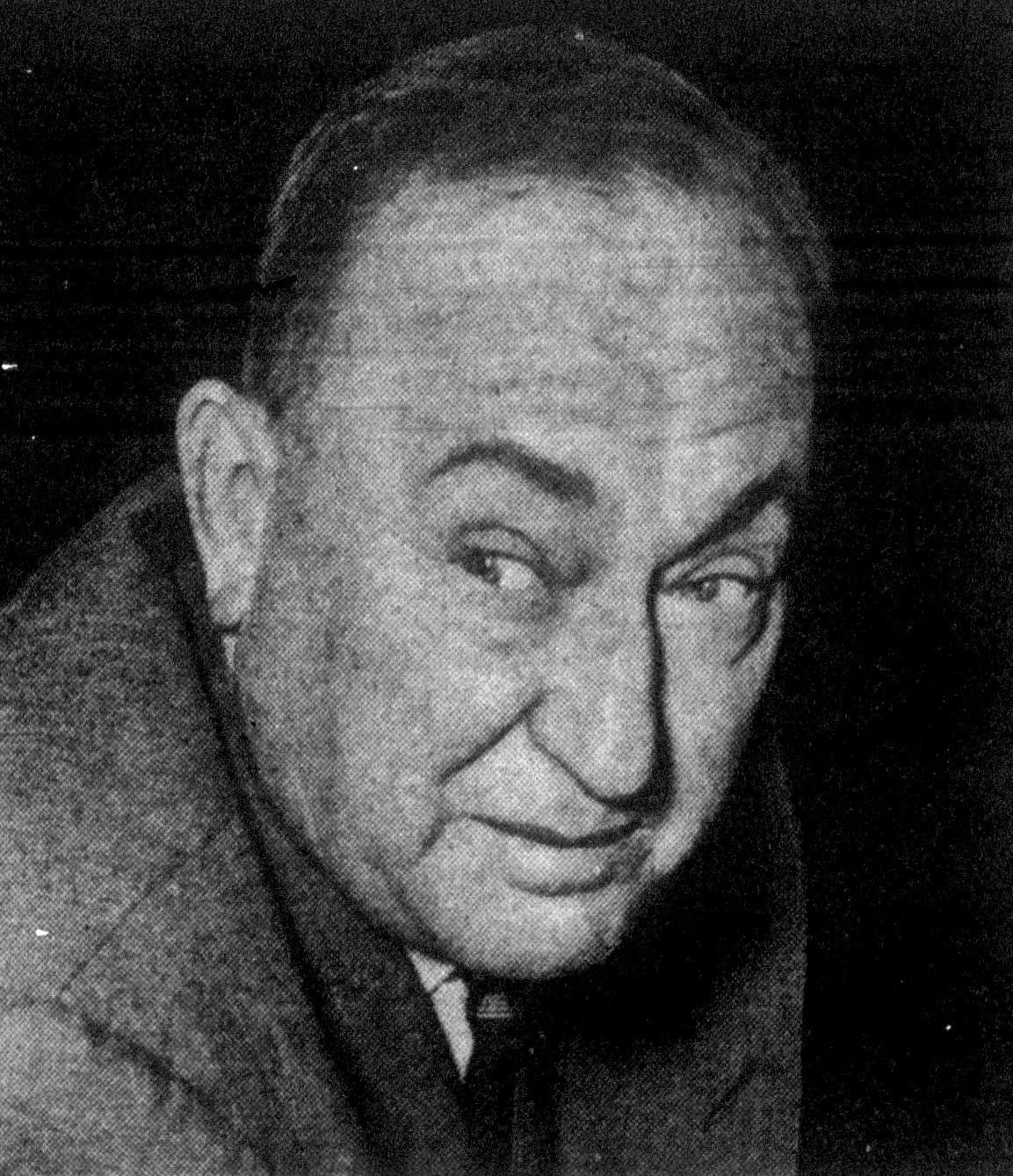
Cobb in 1951

In 1949, at the age of 62, Cobb married a second time, to 40-year-old Frances Fairbairn Cass, a divorcée from Buffalo, New York. Their childless marriage ending with a divorce in 1956. At this time, Cobb became generous with his wealth, donating $100,000 in his parents' name for his hometown to build a modern 24-bed hospital, Cobb Memorial Hospital, which is now part of the Ty Cobb Healthcare System. He also established the Cobb Educational Fund, which awarded scholarships to needy Georgia students bound for college, by endowing it with a $100,000 donation in 1953 (equivalent to approximately $1,203,358 in current year dollars).

Cobb knew that another way he could share his wealth was by having biographies written that would both set the record straight on him and teach young players how to play. John McCallum spent some time with Cobb to write a combination how-to and biography titled The Tiger Wore Spikes: An Informal Biography of Ty Cobb that was published in 1956. In December 1959, he was diagnosed with prostate cancer, diabetes, high blood pressure, and Bright's disease.

It was also during his final years that Cobb began work on his autobiography, My Life in Baseball: The True Record, with writer Al Stump. Cobb retained editorial control over the book and the published version presented him in a positive light. Stump said that the collaboration was contentious, and after Cobb's death Stump published two more books and a short story giving what he said was the "true story." One of these later books was used as the basis for the 1994 film Cobb (a box office flop starring Tommy Lee Jones as Cobb and directed by Ron Shelton). In 2010, an article by William R. "Ron" Cobb (no relation) in the peer-reviewed The National Pastime (the official publication of the Society for American Baseball Research) accused Stump of extensive forgeries of Cobb-related documents and diaries. The article further accused Stump of numerous false statements about Cobb in his last years, most of which were sensationalistic in nature and intended to cast Cobb in an unflattering light.

=== Death ===
In his last days, Cobb spent some time with the old movie comedian Joe E. Brown, talking about the choices he had made in his life. According to Brown, Cobb said he felt that he had made mistakes and that he would do things differently if he could. He had played hard and lived hard all his life, had few friends to show for it at the end, and regretted it. Publicly, however, he claimed to have no regrets: "I've been lucky. I have no right to be regretful of what I did."

He was taken to Emory University Hospital for the last time in June 1961 after falling into a diabetic coma. His first wife Charlie, his son Jimmy, and other family members came to be with him for his final days. He died there on July 17, 1961, at age 74.

...the most sensational player of all the players I have seen in all my life...

— Casey Stengel, The New York Times, July 18, 1961 regarding Ty Cobb shortly after Cobb's death

Approximately 150 friends and relatives attended a brief service in Cornelia, Georgia, and drove to the Cobb family mausoleum in Royston for the burial. Cobb's family kept the event private, not trusting the media to report accurately on it. Baseball's only representatives at his funeral were three old-time players, Ray Schalk, Mickey Cochrane, and Nap Rucker, and Sid Keener, the director of the Baseball Hall of Fame, but messages of condolence numbered in the hundreds and included notes from Joe DiMaggio and Ted Williams. Family in attendance included Cobb's former wife Charlie, his two daughters, his surviving son Jimmy, his two sons-in-law, his daughter-in-law Mary Dunn Cobb and her two children.

At the time of his death, Cobb's estate was reported to be worth at least $11.78 million (equivalent to $127 million today), including $10 million worth of General Motors stock and $1.78 million in The Coca-Cola Company stock. His will left a quarter of his estate to the Cobb Educational Fund, and distributed the rest among his children and grandchildren. Cobb is interred in the Rose Hill Cemetery in Royston, Georgia. As of April 2021, the Ty Cobb Educational Foundation has distributed $19.2 million in college scholarships to needy college bound Georgia students.

== Legacy ==
Ty Cobb was honored alongside the retired numbers of the Detroit Tigers in 2000.

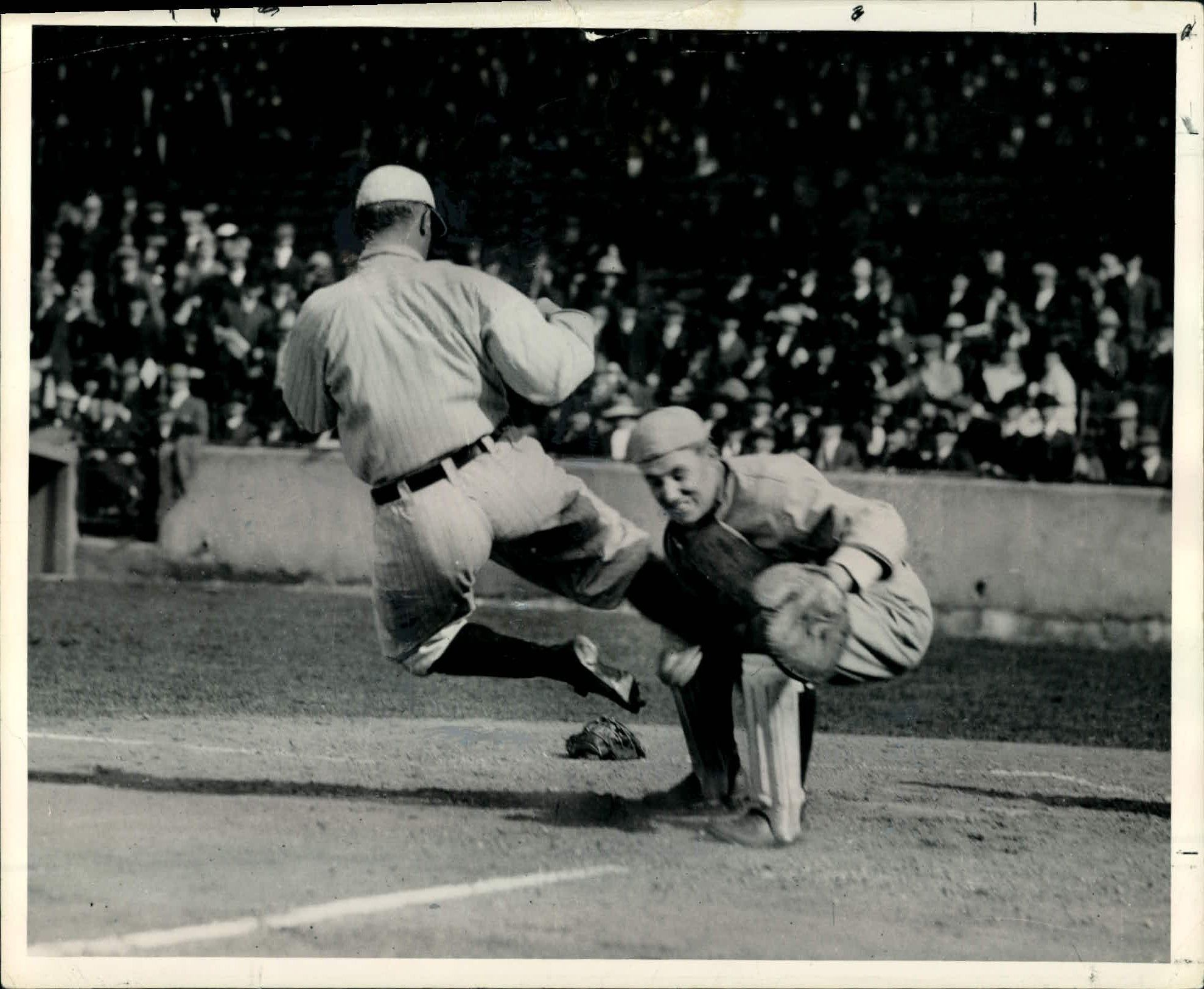
Cobb sliding-high into St. Louis Browns catcher Paul Krichell

The greatness of Ty Cobb was something that had to be seen, and to see him was to remember him forever.

— George Sisler

The historian Steven Elliott Tripp has explored the public's reaction to Cobb as a pioneer sports celebrity and "a player fans loved to hate." Tripp writes that Cobb was both loved and hated as a representative of a particular kind of masculinity on the field, inviting male spectators to participate in the contest through taunts directed at opposing players. Cobb's own sense of manhood, according to Tripp, was a product of his Southern upbringing that prized individualism, excitement, and family honor. Russo wrote, "There is no denying that Cobb ranks as one of baseball's greatest players, if not the game's fiercest competitor." Many of baseball's greatest players were friends with Cobb. Mathewson and Walter Johnson were some of his closest friends. Others included Joe DiMaggio, Ted Williams, Home Run Baker, and Eddie Collins. Following his retirement, Cobb even befriended one of his greatest rivals, Babe Ruth, whose wife Claire was from Georgia.

Cobb has been judged by some historians and journalists as the best player of the dead-ball era, and is generally seen as one of the greatest players of all time.

Some historians, including Wesley Fricks, Dan Holmes, and Charles Leerhsen, have defended Cobb against unfair portrayals of him in popular culture since his death. A noted case is the book written by sportswriter Al Stump in the months after Cobb died in 1961. Stump was later discredited when it became known that he had stolen items belonging to Cobb and also betrayed the access Cobb gave him in his final months. As a result of the movie Cobb, which starred Tommy Lee Jones, there are many myths surrounding Cobb's life, including one that he sharpened his spikes to inflict wounds on opposing players. This accusation was common for many decades before the movie was released.

Lee Blessing wrote the play Cobb in 1989, featuring three actors playing Cobb at different points in his life, arguing with each other and with Oscar Charleston (referred to as the "Black Cobb"). Blessing developed the play after reading the 1984 Cobb biography by Charles Alexander, noting "that most people sentimentalize baseball, and [Cobb] wasn’t sentimental at all." Theater critic Frank Rich wrote that the play depicts Cobb as a controversial titan of America, similar to John D. Rockefeller or Andrew Carnegie.

Writing in The Journal of American Culture, Hunter M. Hampton says that Leerhsen "succeeds in debunking the myth of Cobb that Stump created, but he spawned a new myth by conflating Stump's shortcomings to depict Cobb as an egalitarian."

In 1977, a statue of Ty Cobb, designed by the sculptor Felix de Weldon, was installed outside the Atlanta–Fulton County Stadium. It was relocated to the front of the public library in his hometown of Royston in 2017.

In the band Soundgarden's 1996 album Down on the Upside, the 5th track and single Ty Cobb is a reference to his aggressive playing style.

=== Views on race ===
Cobb's family had a long history of abolitionism: according to biographer Charles Leerhsen, his great-grandfather was a preacher who opposed slavery, his grandfather refused to join the Confederate Army out of opposition to slavery, and his father was a state senator who strongly supported his black constituents and reputedly broke up a lynch mob. Though Cobb did not speak on race during his career, he later praised several black players and spoke strongly in favor of integration. Five years after Jackie Robinson broke the color barrier, Cobb publicly supported blacks and whites playing baseball together, adding: "Certainly it is okay for them to play. I see no reason in the world why we shouldn't compete with colored athletes as long as they conduct themselves with politeness and gentility. Let me say also that no white man has the right to be less of a gentleman than a colored man; in my book that goes not only for baseball but in all walks of life." Using even stronger language, Cobb told the Sporting News in 1952 that "the Negro should be accepted and not grudgingly but wholeheartedly."

In 1953, black newspapers cited his praise for Brooklyn Dodgers' catcher Roy Campanella, who Cobb said was "among the all-time best catchers" in the sport. Following Campanella's accident that left him paralyzed, the Dodgers staged a tribute game where tens of thousands of spectators silently held lit matches above their heads. Cobb wrote the Dodgers owner to show appreciation "for what you did for this fine man." Cobb also stated that Willie Mays was the "only player I'd pay money to see." In the obituaries that ran in the black press following Cobb's death, he was praised for "[speaking] in favor of racial freedom in baseball."

Leerhesen also notes Cobb was the "main defender and patron" of Ulysses Simon Harrison, an African-American youth who was the Tigers' mascot from 1908 to 1910 under the name "L'il Rastus". Rastus was then understood as the name of a stereotypical foolish, carefree or ignorant black man. Cobb, unlike most players, did not rub the boy's head for good luck. Cobb took a protective attitude towards Harrison when the team was traveling in racially-segregated areas, and also employed him during the off-season at Cobb's automobile dealership. As an adult, Harrison worked as a chauffeur for construction executive F. H. Goddard, a job he might have secured with Cobb's assistance.

Despite his public support for black players, Cobb has earned a reputation as "an avowed racist." Evidence for this reputation includes alleged violent outbursts against a black groundskeeper and separately against several black hotel employees; later research suggests that none of the hotel employees were black. Allegations of racism were first suggested by early biographies of Cobb and later popularized by his depiction in Ken Burns' Baseball.

== Teammates ==
Sam Crawford and Ty Cobb were teammates for parts of thirteen seasons. They played beside each other in right and center field, and Crawford followed Cobb in the batting order year after year. Despite the physical closeness, the two had a complicated relationship.

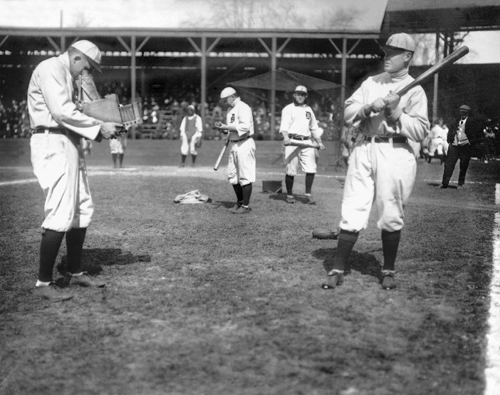
Sam Crawford poses for a photograph by Cobb c. 1914

Initially, they had a student-teacher relationship. Crawford was an established star when Cobb arrived, and Cobb eagerly sought his advice. The student–teacher relationship gradually changed to one of jealous rivals. Cobb was not popular with his teammates, and as Cobb became the biggest star in baseball, Crawford was unhappy with the preferential treatment given to Cobb. Cobb was allowed to show up late for spring training and was given private quarters on the road – perks not offered to Crawford. The competition between the two was intense. Crawford recalled that, if he went three for four on a day when Cobb went hitless, Cobb would turn red and sometimes walk out of the park with the game still on. When it was reported that Nap Lajoie had won the batting title, Crawford was alleged to have been one of several Tigers who sent a telegram to Lajoie congratulating him on beating Cobb.

In retirement, Cobb wrote a letter to a writer for The Sporting News accusing Crawford of not helping in the outfield and of intentionally fouling off balls when Cobb was stealing a base. Crawford learned about the letter in 1946 and accused Cobb of being a "cheapskate" who never helped his teammates. He said that Cobb had not been a very good fielder, "so he blamed me." Crawford denied intentionally trying to deprive Cobb of stolen bases, insisting that Cobb had "dreamed that up."

When asked about the feud, Cobb attributed it to envy. He felt that Crawford was "a hell of a good player," but he was "second best" on the Tigers and "hated to be an also ran." Cobb biographer Richard Bak noted that the two "only barely tolerated each other" and agreed with Cobb that Crawford's attitude was driven by Cobb's having stolen Crawford's thunder.

Although they may not have spoken to each other, Cobb and Crawford developed an ability to communicate non-verbally with looks and nods on the base paths. They became one of the most successful double steal pairings in baseball history.

== Regular season statistics ==
=== Batting average revision ===
When Cobb retired, and for most of the next 70 years following it, he was officially regarded to have had the highest batting average in major league history at .367. This was based on the "best available" statistics, recorded and compiled as they were generated. However, scrupulous modern research reconstructing and verifying box scores game by game revealed a fraction of a .001 point error, (Note: Differences are: .423 (of 1 point in batting average) at SABR; .583 at Baseball Almanac; and .615 at Baseball Reference and the Baseball Hall of Fame, based upon the cited figures given below.) reducing Cobb's average to .366 among numerous reputable sources.

Major League Baseball itself (Note: Which does not maintain "official statistics. In C.B.C. Distribution Marketing v. Major League Baseball, the United States Court of Appeals for the Eighth Circuit upholding a 2007 judgement by the United States District Court for the Eastern District of Missouri, ruled that baseball statistics, as being mere facts, are in the public domain and are therefore not the property of Major League Baseball Enterprises, Inc. or any other private or public entity. However, because Major League Baseball Enterprises, Inc. does have some official legal rights and responsibilities concerning major league baseball – enforcing copyrights on team logos, making the official rules used by the teams, and so forth – and because Major League Baseball does empower the Elias Sports Bureau with "official provider of MLB statistics" status - confusion sometimes arises and thus a few sources can still describe Cobb's major league batting average as being "officially" .367. "Official" in that sense of the word means merely "from the office" of Major League Baseball, the corporation. In 2024, MLB.com incorporated the records of more than 2,300 Negro Leagues players, making Josh Gibson's .372 career batting average the new highest.) is divided on whether to continue to honor Cobb's traditional average (based on 4,191 hits in 11,429 at-bats) or bow to revised records. According to longtime baseball commissioner Bowie Kuhn, who served between 1969 and 1984, Major League Baseball would continue to report the traditional value based on it being grandfathered. In his words (stated in 1981), "The passage of 70 years, in our judgment, constitutes a certain statute of limitation as to recognizing any changes."

Other major reliable sources agree on .366. Some show slightly different numbers for at-bats and hits: SABR (the Society for American Baseball Research) (seconded by John Thorn and Pete Palmer, among others), the Baseball Almanac, and ESPN credit Cobb with 4,189 hits in 11,434 at-bats. Retrosheet gives Cobb the same number of hits in five more at-bats (11,439), and Baseball Reference and the Baseball Hall of Fame add one more at-bat (11,440).

MLB, however, does not insist on censoring even its own, allowing the 2016 publication of an article reporting the .366 figure and its revision by other bodies even on its own website, mlb.com.

=== Career totals ===
In other statistics compiled during his career, Retrosheet indicates Cobb recorded 1 six-hit game, 13 five-hit games, and 82 four-hit games in his MLB career.

Cobb's career totals from Baseball Reference are as follows. Other sources may have slightly different figures. Caught Stealing is not shown comprehensively because the stat was not regularly recorded until 1920.

G	AB	R	H	2B	3B	HR	RBI	SB	CS	BB	SO	BA	OBP	SLG	TB	SH	HBP
3,034	11,440	2,245	4,189	724	295	117	1,944	897	212	1,249	680	.366	.433	.512	5,854	292	94

Cobb's career totals published by Major League Baseball Enterprises, Inc. are shown below:

G	AB	R	H	2B	3B	HR	RBI	SB	CS	BB	SO	BA	OBP	SLG	TB	SH	HBP
3,035	11,429	2,246	4,191	723	297	117	1,938	892	---	1,249	357	.367	.433	.513	5,859	295	94

== See also ==
- Major League Baseball titles leaders
- Major League Baseball Triple Crown
- List of Major League Baseball annual home run leaders
- List of Major League Baseball annual runs scored leaders
- List of Major League Baseball annual doubles leaders
- List of Major League Baseball annual runs batted in leaders
- List of Major League Baseball annual stolen base leaders
- List of Major League Baseball annual triples leaders
- List of Major League Baseball batting champions
- List of Major League Baseball career hits leaders
- List of Major League Baseball career stolen bases leaders
- List of Major League Baseball career runs scored leaders
- List of Major League Baseball career runs batted in leaders
- List of Major League Baseball career on-base percentage leaders
- List of Major League Baseball career OPS leaders
- List of Major League Baseball career total bases leaders
- List of Major League Baseball career doubles leaders
- List of Major League Baseball career triples leaders
- List of Major League Baseball single-game hits leaders
- List of Major League Baseball player-managers
- List of Major League Baseball individual streaks
