= Pawtucket Maroons =

- 1894–1996; (1892, 1894–1899, 1908, 1914–1915); Pawtucket, Rhode Island

Minor league affiliations
- Class: Class B (1892, 1894–1899); Class D (1908); Class C (1914–1915)
- League: New England League (1892, 1894–1899); Atlantic Association (1908); Colonial League (1914–1915)

Major league affiliations
- Team: None

Minor league titles
- League titles (0): None
- Wild card berths (0): None

Team data
- Name: Pawtucket Secrets (1892); Pawtucket Maroons (1894-1896); Pawtucket Phenoms (1897); Pawtucket Tigers (1898, 1914); Pawtucket Colts (1899, 1908); Pawtucket Rovers (1915)
- Ballpark: Crescent Park (1892, 1894–1899, 1908, 1914–1915); Dexter Street Grounds (1892, 1894–1899, 1908, 1914–1915

The Pawtucket Maroons were an early minor league baseball team based in Pawtucket, Rhode Island. The "Maroons" were part of a Pawtucket tenure as members of the New England League beginning in 1892 and continuing through the 1899 season. Pawtucket teams then played briefly in the 1908 Atlantic League and were members of the Colonial League in 1914 and 1915.

The Colonial teams of the era hosted minor league home games at the Dexter Street Grounds, with select Sunday games played at Crescent Park.

Pawtucket next hosted minor league baseball in 1946, when the Pawtucket Slaters resumed play in the New England League, after a thirty-season gap between Pawtucket minor league teams.

== History ==
=== 1892 to 1895 - New England League ===
Pawtucket hosted minor league play for the first time in 1892, when the Pawtucket franchise joined the eight-team, Class B level New England League.

The Pawtucket "Secrets" played a partial season in the 1892 New England League. Pawtucket disbanded on July 26, 1892, with a 17–43 record in the eight–team New England League, which lost two other teams during the season. Pawtucket finished behind first place Woonsocket team in the final standings, as the New England League ended the season with five remaining teams.

In 1893, Pawtucket did not continue play as the New England League reduced two teams and played the season as a six team, Class B level league. The Fall River Indians were the league champions, placing first in the league standing, as no playoffs were held.

The Pawtucket "Maroons" resumed minor league play as the 1894 New England League expanded to again become an eight–team league, adding the Pawtucket and Haverhill teams as members to the league. Haverhill and Pawtucket joined the Bangor Millionaires, Brockton Shoemakers, Fall River Indians, Lewiston, Portland and Worcester teams in beginning league play on April 28, 1894.

On July 30, 1894, Buck Freeman, playing for Haverhill at home against Pawtucket Maroons, hit four home runs in the game. Freeman went 5-5 with four homers (one was an inside the park home run) with 13 RBIs. In the next game, Freeman hit 2 more home runs.

Catcher George Yeager had a whirlwind season in 1894, ending up on the Pawtucket roster. Beginning the season with a semi-professional team in Chambersburg, Pennsylvania, Yeager was involved in a fight at a cigar shop where he fractured the skull of another man. Yeager faced a trial, but the other victim had fled to Illinois and had been arrested in another incident, escaped from jail and was still a fugitive when Yeager's case went to trial. Charges were dismissed against Yeager. In July, Yeager was playing with the Brockton Shoemakers in the New England League. After the Brockton team folded on August 25, 1894, Yeager was signed by Pawtucket. Yeager would remain with Pawtucket for three seasons.

Pawtucket ended the season in sixth place in the 1894 New England League season. With a record of 46–52, playing the season under managers Frank Leonard and Royal Perrin. The Fall River Indians were the league champions for the second consecutive season, finishing 16.5 games ahead of Pawtucket. Tom Bannon of Pawtucket led the New England League with both 101 stolen bases and 137 runs scored.

As the Pawtucket Maroons continued New England League play in 1895, catcher George Yeager continued to make news with Pawtucket. On May 4, 1895, Yeager had five hits, with a double and two home runs in the contest. On June 8, 1895, he hit a grand slam. On June 19, 1895, Yeager was ejected from a game for throwing a broom at the umpire. On July 8, 1895, Yeager was fined $10 by a different umpire "for insolent language and threatening with the bat." On July 11, 1895, Yeager went 5-for-5 at the plate in a home game.

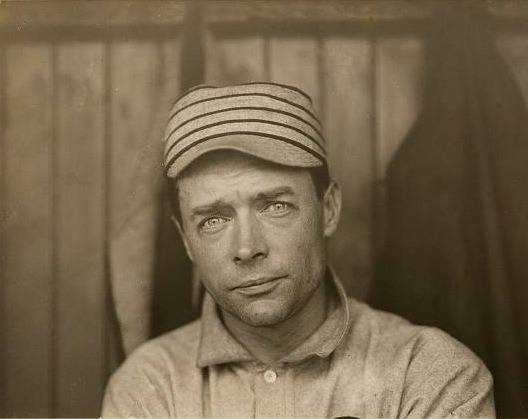
(1911) Harry Davis, Philadelphia Athletics. Davis played with Pawtucket in 1884 and 1895, managing the team in 1895. Davis went on to lead the American League in home runs four times in his 22 year major league career.

The Pawtucket Maroons continued membership in the 1895 Class B level New England League and began the season with the rest of the eight–team league. The Pawtucket Maroons finished in fourth place in the eight–team league. With a final record of 52–53, the Maroons ended the season 14.5 games behind the first place Fall River Indians in the final standings. Louis Bacon and Harry Davis managed Pawtucket during the 1895 season. Player/manager Harry Davis led the New England league with a .391 batting average and 16 home runs, as well as 189 total hits. Irv Waldron had 84 stolen bases to lead the league.

After the 1895 season ended for Pawtucket, Harry Davis was signed by the New York Giants and made his major league debut in on September 27, 1895, getting three hits the game against the Boston Red Sox in his first game. Davis went on to play for the Philadelphia Athletics, leading the American League home runs in four consecutive seasons from 1904 to 1907. Davis would play 22 seasons in the major leagues.

After the 1895 New England season concluded, Pawtucket catcher George Yeager was recruited to play for a Fall River, Massachusetts team in an exhibition series featuring teams from Fall River, New Bedford, Massachusetts and Newport, Rhode Island. In the era of segregated baseball, the three teams joined by the trailblazing African-American Cuban Giants, which featured future Baseball Hall of Fame member Frank Grant. Each team was to play at least 11 games. Yeager played in the game against the Cuban Giants was on September 13, 1895, in a game won 16-9 by the Fall River team.

=== 1896 to 1899 - New England League ===
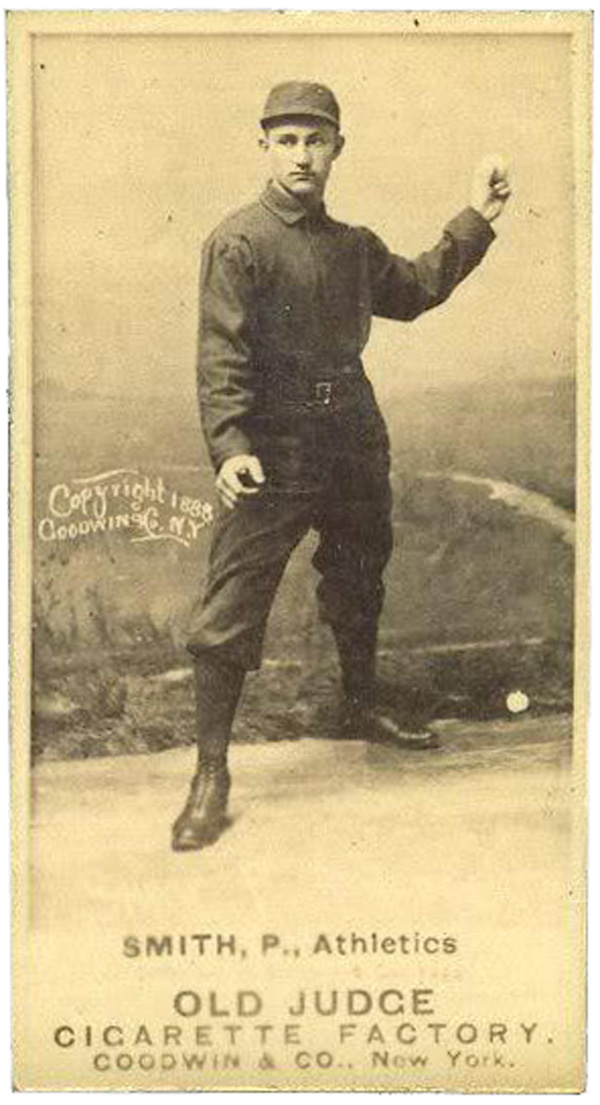
(1888) Phenomenal Smith, Philadelphia Athletics, Old Judge Tobacco card. Smith managed Pawtucket in 1896 and 1897 and was the namesake of the "Phenoms."

With Germany "Phenomenal" Smith beginning a tenure as manager, the 1896 Pawtucket Maroons finished in fifth place in the New England League season. Smith had reportedly received the nickname "Phenomenal" after pitching a no-hitter for the Philadelphia Athletics against the Baltimore Orioles on October 3, 1885, facing the minimum of 27 batters in the game.

George Yeager played his final season with Pawtucket in 1896. On May 20, 1896, Yeager and manager Joe Smith were both ejected from a game. On June 5, 1895, Yeager homered twice in an 11-inning game won by Pawtucket. In August Yeager was fined $25 "for giving unsolicited advice to his manager," as the Boston Herald reported. Later in August while catching, he became angry at Pawtucket's pitcher and he was ordered to switch positions with the Pawtucket right fielder.

With Yeager's performance getting notice from scouts (113 runs scored, 36 stolen bases, 25 home runs, a .345 batting average, and slugged .604) he was purchased by the Boston Beaneaters on September 5, 1895. Two days later, in his last game before joining Boston, Yeager hit a game winning grand slam.

Pawtucket ended the 1896 New England League season with a 55–54 record, playing its first season under manager Phenomenal Smith. The league championship was won again by the Fall River Indians, who finished 14.0 games ahead of fifth place Pawtucket in the final standings, as the league held no playoffs. The Maroons' Irv Waldron led the New England League with both 137 runs and 182 total hits. Pawtucket catcher George Yeager led the league with 25 home runs before he advanced to catch for the Boston Beaneaters at the end of the season.

In 1897, the Pawtucket team was called the "Phenoms" as the team was managed again by their new namesake, Phenomenal Smith. The New England League reduced teams and played as six–team Class B level league The Brockton Shoemakers, Fall River Indians, New Bedford Whalers, Newport Colts and Taunton Herrings teams joined Pawtucket in 1897 New England League play.

After beginning league play on May 1, 1897, the Pawtucket Phenoms ended the New England League season in third place. The Phenoms ended the season with a 70–37 record, playing under returning manager Phenomenal Smith. Brockton and Newport finished in a first-place tie, as they ended the New England League season identical records and no playoff was held between the two teams. Brockton and Newport were followed in the New England League standings by the Pawtucket Phenoms (54–51), Fall River Indians (47–59), Taunton Herrings (40–68) and New Bedford Whalers (38–67). Tom News of Pawtucket hit 17 home runs to lead the New England League.

In 1898, Phenomenal Smith left Pawtucket and became manager of the Fall River Indians, replaced as manager in Pawtucket by Hobe Whiting, who had played with Pawtucket since 1895. In 1900, while manager of the Norfolk Phenoms, Phenomenal Smith resurrected the career of Baseball Hall of Fame member Christy Mathewson. Smith had signed Mathewson after his 2–13 season pitching for the Taunton Herrings in the 1899 New England League. Signed by Smith to a contract for $90.00 per month, Under Smith's tutelage, Mathewson went on to have an 18–2 season with the Phenoms, before being acquired by the New York Giants. Mathewson made his debut with New York on July 18, 1900, beginning a major league career that saw him win 373 games for the Giants.

Continuing play in the 1898 six–team Class B level New England League, the Pawtucket "Tigers" played a shortened season. On July 5, 1898, the New England League stopped play. The Pawtucket Tigers ended the season with a record of 26–23 and were in second place under new manager Hobe Whiting when the New England League folded. Pawtucket finished 6.5 games behind of the first place Brockton Shoemakers in the final standings. In the shortened season, Tom News of the Tigers won the New England league batting title, hitting .401, and added a league leading 9 home runs. Pawtucket pitcher Frank Todd led the New England League with a 13 wins.

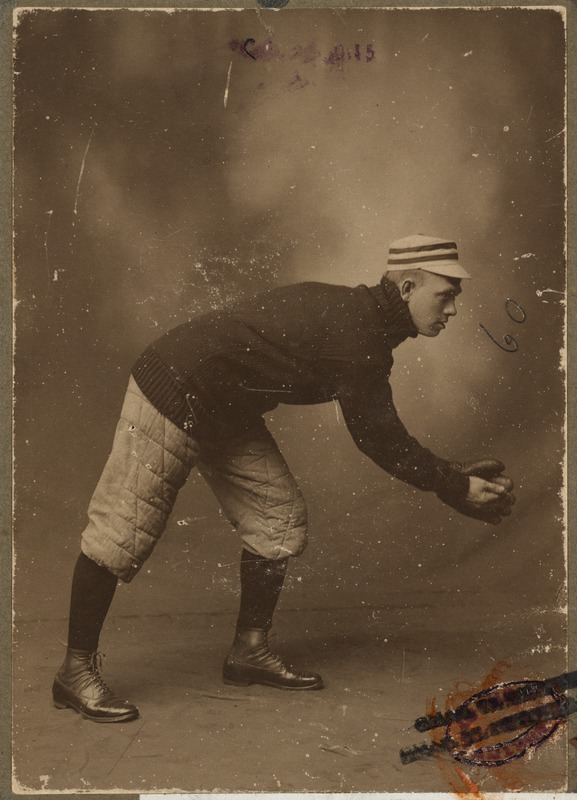
(1901) Hobe Ferris, Boston Americans. Ferris played for Pawtucket from 1897 to 1899.

Infielder Hobe Ferris played for Pawtucket from 1897 to 1899. He played sparingly in 1897 and 1898 before playing regularly with Pawtucket in 1899 before the team folded. He played for the Norwich Witches in 1900 before making his major league debut with the Boston Americans of the newly formed American League in 1901 and committing 61 errors as a rookie, a record at the time. Ferris's error total remains the second-highest total ever for a second baseman in American League history. Ferris was previously a shortstop and his fielding improved greatly over the following seasons. Known to be feisty, in 1902, Ferris was suspended for an altercation with umpire Jack Sheridan and received a three-day suspension from American League president Ban Johnson. "Ferris deserves his suspension, and while it will hurt Collins’ club, I am glad of it," wrote Peter Kelley of the Boston Journal, regarding the incident. On September 11, 1906, he fought with Boston teammate Jack Hayden during a game in New York and kicked Hayden in the face, knocking out some of Hayden's teeth. Both players were arrested, but neither pressed charges. Ban Johnson suspended Ferris for the remainder of the season.

The Pawtucket "Colts" continued play as the New England League resumed play in 1899 after folding during the previous season. The league expanded from six teams to eight teams to begin the 1899 season, but four of the teams folded during the season, Pawtucket included. On August 8, 1899, with a 37–40 record, Pawtucket folded along with the Brockton Shoemakers, who were leading the league standings. Pawtucket played the shortened season under returning manager Hobe Whiting. The Portland Phenoms, led by manager Phenomenal Smith, were the eventual league champion in 1899, completing the season in first place, but not without controversy.

There was controversy surrounding the conclusion of the New England League season. The Newport Colts won the second half of the 1899 New England League season but did so under dubious circumstances. Allegedly, the Portland Phenoms and Manchester, not wanting Newport to win the second half of the season, expanded the schedule on the final day from a doubleheader to play six games in one day, beginning at 9:00 am. Manchester won all six games, to move ahead of Newport in the standings, but the league allowed only two of the wins. In was noted that Portland subsequently refused to play Newport in the finals after their initial impropriety.

After failing to complete the previous two seasons, the New England League did not return to play in the 1900 season. The league reformed in 1901 without Pawtucket as a member.

=== 1908 - Brief Atlantic Association season ===
The Pawtucket "Colts" reformed briefly in 1908, becoming members of a short-lived league. The Colts began the season playing as members of the Class D level Atlantic Association. The Attleboro Angels, Lewiston, Newport Ponies, Portland Blue Sox and Woonsocket Trotters teams joined with Pawtucket in forming the league, which folded after playing less than three weeks.

The Atlantic Association began minor league league play on May 2, 1908. On May 19, 1908, Pawtucket folded with a 6–3 record under manager Bill Conners. Two days later, the six-team Atlantic Association league folded. The Atlantic Association never reformed as a minor league. The league restructured with new teams and played the rest of the 1908 season without affiliation with National Association of Professional Baseball Leagues.

=== 1914 & 1915 - Colonial League ===
In 1914, the Pawtucket "Tigers" resumed minor league play and became charter members of the newly formed Colonial League, a league that became mired in controversy, some of it surrounding the Pawtucket ownership. The Colonial League was formed for the 1914 season as a six–team Class C level minor league. The Brockton Shoemakers, Fall River Spindles, New Bedford Whalers, Pawtucket Tigers, Taunton Herrings and Woonsocket Speeders teams joined Pawtucket in the newly formed league.

During their first 1914 season, it was speculated that the Colonial League was being controlled by the major league rival Federal League, a claim which was denied by the league, but later proved to be accurate. In April 1914, Pawtucket team owner Alexander Bannwart drew attention in hiring Frank "Big Jeff" Pfeffer to manage the Pawtucket Tigers after a hiatus from baseball while running a hotel in nearby Providence. In May, it was suspected that Bannwart was working as an "agent" of the Federal League, which Bannwart denied.

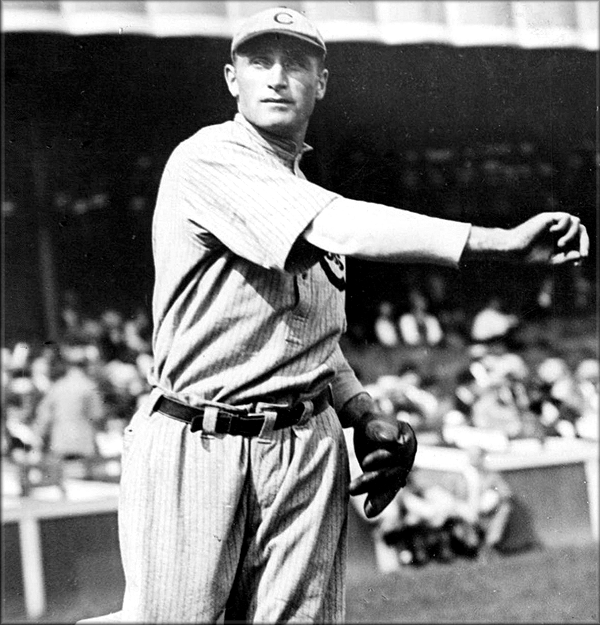
(1910) Big Jeff Pfeffer. Pfeffer was the player/manager for Pawtucket in 1914. He was suspended and then replaced in July 1914 after assaulting team owner Alexander Bannwart.

On July 4, 1914, Pfeffer assaulted Bannwart in the stands at Woonsocket before the game that day and was suspended by the league president. Banwart stated to the press that he "handed Big Jeff a jolt on the jaw and stood him on his head like a baby" in the fracas, which spilled onto the field and drew a big crowd. Pawtucket second baseman Joseph Callahan was appointed as interim manager to replace Pfeffer, who never returned to organized baseball following the incident.

The 1914 Pawtucket Tigers ended their first Colonial League season in fifth place in the final standings of the newly formed league, which held no playoffs. With a record of 46–56 the Tigers placed fifth in the six-team league. Playing the season under managers Frank "Big Jeff" Pfeffer, Joseph Callahan and William Fortin, Pawtucket finished 18.0 games behind the first place Fall River Spindles in the final standings. John Gilmore of Pawtucket led the league with 9 home runs.

Before the 1915 season, the Colonial League reorganized itself, officially becoming a farm system for the major league rival Federal League. As a result, the league voluntarily withdrew itself from the National Association structure and affiliation to align with the Federal League. At the April 1915 Colonial League meeting, Charles Coppen was re-elected as president and Pawtucket's Alexander Bannwart was elected as league secretary. Walter S. Ward, the treasurer of the Brooklyn Tip-Tops and the son of Brooklyn team owner George S. Ward, was elected as the Colonial League's treasurer.

Wishing to expand the Colonial League into Springfield, Massachusetts, Hartford, Connecticut and New Haven, Connecticut, whose regions belonged to the Eastern Association, the Colonial League expanded by two teams as it reorganized itself as the farm system for the Federal League. and withdrew itself from the structure of the National Association. Continuing play in the eight-team 1915 Colonial League, the Pawtucket }Rovers" joined the Brockton Shoemakers, Fall River Spindles, Hartford Senators, New Bedford Whalers, New Haven White Wings, Springfield Tips and Taunton Herrings teams in Colonial League play.

After their fifth place finish the previous season, the Pawtucket "Rovers" continued play in the 1915 Colonial League and ended the season in last place. Pawtucket finished the season with a 37–57 record as the Rovers finished 16.5 games behind the first place Hartford Senators, who had a 55–42 record. Jim Connor served as the Pawtucket manager, as Pawtucket ended the season in sixth place after the Fall River and Taunton teams folded and were unable to finish the season.

The Federal League folded following the 1915 season, and the Colonial League followed suit. With legal disputes and financial challenges mounting, the Federal League was forced to fold following the 1915 season, leaving the Colonial League unable to continue following the 1915 league season. The Colonial League's financial struggles were directed at Pawtucket's Alexander Bannwart and numerous league policies he championed. The salary maximums set by Bannwart and approved by the league were cited for the poor quality of play and subsequent low fan interest in the league. In August 1915, Bannwart resigned from his Colonial League leadership role before the conclusion of the season.

Following the demise of the 1915 Federal League, Pawtucket did not host another a minor league team until the 1946 season, when the Pawtucket Slaters resumed play as members of the reformed New England League.

== The ballparks ==
The Pawtucket teams played their regular minor league home games at the Dexter Street grounds in the Pawtucket. The grounds also hosted soccer games in the era, beginning in 1887. The ballpark site was located at the corner of Barton Street and Dexter Street in Pawtucket. Today, the ballpark site is commercial property.

In the era, Pawtucket teams hosted Sunday minor league games at Crescent Park. Crescent Park was located in neighboring East Providence, Rhode Island. The site also hosted major league teams playing exhibitions in the early 1900s. The amusement park operated from 1887 to 1979. Built in 1895, the Crescent Park Carousel survives and is listed on the National Register of Historic Places. Today, the historic carousel is located at 700 Bullocks Point Avenue in Riverside, Rhode Island.

== Timeline ==
Year(s)	# Yrs.	Team	League	Level	Ballpark
1892	1	Pawtucket Secrets	New England League	Class B	Crescent Park / Dexter Street Grounds
1894-1896	3	Pawtucket Maroons	New England League	Class B	Crescent Park / Dexter Street Grounds
1897	1	Pawtucket Phenoms	New England League	Class B	Crescent Park / Dexter Street Grounds
1898	4	Pawtucket Tigers	New England League	Class B	Crescent Park / Dexter Street Grounds
1899	1	Pawtucket Colts	New England League	Class B	Crescent Park / Dexter Street Grounds
1908	1	Pawtucket Colts	Atlantic Association	Class D	Crescent Park / Dexter Street Grounds
1914	1	Pawtucket Tigers	Colonial League	Class C	Crescent Park / Dexter Street Grounds
1915	1	Pawtucket Rovers	Colonial League	Class C	Crescent Park / Dexter Street Grounds

== Year–by–year records ==
Year	Record	Place	Manager	Playoffs/notes
1892	17–47	NA	William Rowe	Team folded July 2
1894	46–52	6th	Frank Leonard / Royal Perrin	No playoffs held
1895	52–53	4th	Louis Bacon / Harry Davis	No playoffs held
1896	55–54	5th	Phenomenal Smith	No playoffs held
1897	54–51	3rd	Phenomenal Smith	No playoffs held
1898	26–23	2nd	Hobe Whiting	League folded July 5 No playoffs held
1899	37–40	NA	Hobe Whiting	Team disbanded August 8
1908	6–3	3rd	William Conners	Team folded May 19; League folded May 21
1914	45–56	5th	Big Jeff Pfeffer / Joseph Callahan / William Fortin	No playoffs held
1915	37–57	6th	Jim Connor	Did not qualify

== Notable alumni ==
- Willie Adams (1915)
- Tom Bannon (1894)
- Harry Barton (1895–1896)
- Larry Battam (1897)
- Bill Bergen (1898)
- George Bone (1898–1899)
- Al Boucher (1915)
- John Buckley (1895)
- Fred Buelow (1897–1898)
- Doc Casey (1892)
- Frank Connaughton (1892)
- Jim Connor (1915, MGR)
- Frank Corridon (1899)
- Bill Coughlin (1896–1898)
- Roscoe Coughlin (1897)
- Harry Davis (1894; 1895, MGR)
- Pat Duff (1898)
- Hobe Ferris (1898–1899)
- Henry Fournier (1894)
- Bill Friel (1898)
- Dinty Gearin (1915)
- Paddy Greene (1899)
- Pat Hannivan (1894–1896)
- Jack Horner (1897–1898)
- Byron Houck (1915)
- Mike Jordan (1892)
- Pete LePine (1899)
- Alfred Lawson (1894)
- Frank Leonard (1894, MGR)
- Ezra Lincoln (1896)
- John McGlone (1894)
- Bill Mellor (1894–1895)
- Danny Murphy (1899, 1915)
- Big Jeff Pfeffer (1914, MGR)
- Doc Potts (1896)
- Frank Quinlan (1892)
- Mike Roach (1894)
- Bill Rotes (1896, 1989)
- Harvey Russell (1915)
- Frank Sexton (1892)
- Tim Shinnick (1894)
- Phenomenal Smith (1896–1897, MGR)
- Rudy Sommers (1915)
- Dummy Stephenson (1895)
- Tom Stouch (1897–1898)
- Fred Tenney (1892)
- Frank Todd (1895, 1898–1899)
- Irv Waldron (1895–1896)
- Nick Wise (1894–1895, 1897)
- George Yeager (1894–1896)
- Stan Yerkes (1896–1897)

== See also ==
- Pawtucket (minor league baseball) players
- Pawtucket Maroons players
- Pawtucket Phenoms players
- Pawtucket Tigers players
- Pawtucket Colts players
- Pawtucket Rovers players
