= Attleboro Burros =

- 1928; (1908, 1928, 1933); Attleboro, Massachusetts

Minor league affiliations
- Class: Class D (1908); Class B (1928, 1933)
- League: Atlantic Association (1908); New England League (1928, 1933)

Major league affiliations
- Team: New York Giants (1933)

Minor league titles
- League titles (0): None
- Conference titles (1): 1928

Team data
- Name: Attleboro Angels (1908); Attleboro Burros (1928); Attleboro (1933)
- Ballpark: Brady Field (1908); Hayward Field (1928, 1933)

The Attleboro Burros were a minor league baseball team based in Attleboro, Massachusetts. In 1928, the Burros played the season as members of the Class B level New England League, reaching the league playoff Final. The Burros were preceded and succeeded by two Attleboro teams that played partial minor league seasons. The Attleboro Angels played briefly in the 1908 Atlantic Association and Attleboro played a few games in returning to the New England League in 1933.

The 1933 Attleboro team was a minor league affiliate of the New York Giants.

Attleboro teams hosted minor league home games at the Brady Field in 1908 and Hayward Field in 1928 and 1933.

== History ==
=== 1908: Atlantic Association ===
In 1908, the Attleboro "Angels" began minor league play, as Attleboro became members of the six–team Class D level Atlantic Association during the season. The Lewiston, Pawtucket Colts, Portland Blue Sox, Newport Ponies and Woonsocket Trotters teams joined the Taunton Angels in beginning league play on May 1, 1908, before the franchise relocated.

In 1908, the Taunton Angels began Atlantic Association play, before the Taunton franchise moved to Attleboro, Massachusetts. The move to Attleboro was short-lived as the Atlantic Association disbanded on May 21, 1908, due to a "lack of public interest." The Taunton/Attleboro Angles had an overall record of 1–12 record, playing the brief season under managers Mike McDermott, Bill Wilson and McEleney.

=== 1928 & 1933: New England League ===
The Attleboro "Burros" joined the eight-team Class B level New England League in 1928 and won the first-half pennant in a split-season schedule. The Brockton Shoemakers, Haverhill Hillies, Lewiston-Auburn Twins, Lynn Papooses, Manchester Blue Sox, Portland Mariners and Salem Witches joined Attleboro in beginning league play on May 16, 1928.

Attleboro placed sixth in the overall New England League standings in 1928. With a record of 47-49, the Burros were managed by Patsy Donovan, a former major league manager and Bill Hunnefield. The Burrows won the first-half pennant of the split-season schedule and advanced to the playoff finals. The Lynn Papooses defeated the Attleboro Burros four games to three in the league final. Burros' pitcher John Pomorski had 21 wins to lead the New England League. Despite reaching the 1928 league finals, the Attleboro franchise did not return to the 1929 New England League.

In 1933, Attleboro briefly returned to play as a minor league affiliate of the New York Giants, playing in a final season as members of the six–team Class B level New England League. The Lowell Lauriers, New Bedford Whalers, Quincy Shipbuilders, Taunton Blues and Worcester Chiefs joined Attleboro in beginning league play on May 17, 1933.

The 1933 Attleboro team relocated during the season and finished last in the standings after playing in three cities. Nine days into the season, on May 26, 1933, Attleboro, with a 2–6, record moved to Lawrence and continued play as the Lawrence Weavers. After playing in Lawrence, the team relocated to a third city as the franchise moved to Woonsocket, Rhode Island on July 18, 1933. Overall, the three-city team finished with a 27–58 overall record and placed sixth in the standings of the six–team league. The returning Bill Hunnefield and Mark Devlin managed the team. Skinny Graham hit .409 for the season, playing for the Attleboro/Lawrence/Woonsocket team.

The Woonsocket team did not resume play in 1934, as the New England League folded following the conclusion of the 1933 season. Attleboro, Massachusetts has not hosted another minor league team.

== The ballparks ==
The 1908 Attleboro Angels played home minor league games at Brady Field. Eighteen Baseball Hall of Fame members played at the ballpark in 1920, including Babe Ruth. Pro Football Hall of Fame member Jim Thorpe also participated. Baseball Hall of Fame members Grover Cleveland Alexander, Dave Bancroft, Eddie Collins, Frankie Frisch, Goose Goslin, Bucky Harris, Harry Heilmann, Harry Hooper, Rogers Hornsby, Walter Johnson, Rabbit Maranville, Rube Marquard, Sam Rice, George Sisler, Pie Traynor, Zack Wheat, and Ross Youngs also played in the games at the ballpark. Brady Field was located off North Main Street, near Veery Road & Lincoln Avenue.

In 1928 and 1933, Attleboro hosted home minor league games at Hayward Field. The ballfield was located on Hayward Street and is still in use as a public park. Today, the 9-acre Hayward Field houses a regulation ballfield, football field and a swimming pool and other amenities. It is located at 79 North Avenue.

== Timeline ==
Year(s)	# Yrs.	Team	Level	League	Affiliate	Ballpark
1908	1	Attleboro Angels	Class D	Atlantic Association	None	Brady Field
1928	1	Attleboro Burros	Class B	New England League	None	Heyward Field
1933	1	Attleboro	Class B	New England League	New York Giants	Heyward Field

== Year-by-year records ==
Year	Record	Finish	Manager	Playoffs/notes
1908	1–12	NA	Mike McDermott; Bill Wilson / McEleney	Taunton moved to Attleboro; League disbanded May 21
1928	47–49	6th	Patsy Donovan / Bill Hunnefield	Won first half pennant Lost in finals
1933	27–50	6th	Bill Hunnefield / Mark Devlin	Attleboro (2-6) moved to Lawrence May 26; Lawrence (12–24) moved to Woonsocket July 18

== Notable alumni ==
- Patsy Donovan (1928, MGR)
- Tom Drohan (1908)
- Skinny Graham (1933)
- Bill Hunnefield (1928, 1933 MGR)
- Roy Hutson (1928)
- Hugh Mulcahy (1933) MLB All-Star
- John Pomorski (1928)

== See also ==
- Attleboro Angels players
- Attleboro Burros players
- Brady Field photo
