= Washington Senators (Atlantic Association) =

- 1890; Washington D.C.

Minor league affiliations
- Class: Independent (1890)
- League: Atlantic Association (1890)

Major league affiliations
- Team: None

Minor league titles
- League titles (0): None

Team data
- Name: Washington Senators (1890)
- Ballpark: Atlantic Park (1890); Swampdoodle Grounds (1890)

The Washington Senators were a short lived minor league baseball team based in Washington D.C. In 1890, the Senators were a charter member of the Atlantic Association before the team folded during the 1890 season. Owned and managed by Ted Sullivan, the Senators hosted minor league home games at both Atlantic Park and the Swampdoodle Grounds.

== History ==
In 1890, the Washington Senators began play as charter members of the eight–team Atlantic Association. The Senators had played the previous season in the major league level American Association. Owned by Walter Hewett, the Senators franchise had been a strong, profitable franchise in the American Association before the team was forced out of the 1890 league by the other club owners. Hewett then sold the Washington Senators to Ted Sullivan, who was granted an Atlantic Association franchise.

Hewitt and Sullivan then combined resources and began construction of a ballpark called the "Atlantic Park" in honor of the new league. The Washington Senators played an integrated exhibition game against the Cuban Giants on April 6, 1890, at Atlantic Park. On April 16, 1890, the Senators hosted another integrated exhibition game. The Senators played against the New York Gorhams in front of 300 fans at Atlantic Park. Washington defeated the Gorhams 15–1 in the exhibition game.

Two days later, on April 18, 1890, the Senators and Grohams played a second exhibition on the day before the regular season began, with Washington winning 26–2. The next day, Washington lost their Atlantic Association opening game to Hartford by the score of 15–13.

Washington began play in the eight–team Atlantic Association with the Baltimore Orioles, Hartford Nutmeggers, Jersey City Gladiators, New Haven Nutmegs, Newark Little Giants, Wilmington Peach Growers and the Worcester Grays teams joining the Senators as charter members.

On May 21, 1890, the Senators were on the losing end of a no-hitter. John Doran, pitching for the New Haven Nutmegs in an Atlantic Association contest, threw a no–hit game against Washington, winning the game 4–0.

The Washington Senators began play under manager Ted Sullivan, who also owned the team. The Senators had a record of 38–47 through July 30, 1908.

As the season progressed, the franchise faced financial difficulties. Ted Sullivan attempted to organize investors to continue playing, but he was not successful. After playing their final game on June 30, the franchise was formally dissolved on August 2, 1890.

The Washington Senators joined the 1891 major league level American Association.

== The ballparks ==
It was reported the owners of the 1890 Washington Senators built Atlantic Park for the ballclub. The ballpark was located at 17th Street and U Street in Washington D.C.

The 1890 Washington Senators also were noted to have played home games at Swampdoodle Grounds. The ballpark was located at North Capital Street and Massachusetts Avenue, Washington D.C. Today, the site is the Union Station Shops.

== Year–by–year records ==
Year	Record	Finish	Manager	Playoffs/Notes
1890	38–47	NA	Ocheltree / Ted Sullivan	Team disbanded August 2

== Notable alumni ==
- Frank Bird (1890)
- Alexander Donoghue (1890)
- Bill Gleason (1890)
- Belden Hill (1890)
- Mike Jordan (1890)
- Harry Mace (1890)
- Bill Phillips (1890)
- John Riddle (1890)
- Ted Sullivan (1890, MGR)
- Fred Underwood (1890)
- Jack Wentz (1890)
- Lew Whistler (1890)
- Washington Senators (minor league) players
