= Atlantic Association =

- Classification: Independent (1889–1890); Class D (1908)
- Sport: Minor League Baseball
- First season: 1889; 1908
- Folded: 1890 (1st iteration); 1908 (2nd iteration)
- President: James M. Braden (1889–1890); Hugh McBreen (1908)
- No. of teams: 14 (Total – 1st iteration); 7 (Total – 2nd iteration)
- Country: United States
- Most titles: 1 Worcester (1889); New Haven Nutmegs (1890); Portland Blue Sox (1908)
- Related competitions: New England League

The Atlantic Association was a minor league baseball organization that operated between 1889 and 1890 and again in 1908 in the Northeastern United States.

== History ==
=== First demise ===
In each of the two seasons 4 or more teams failed to finish the season and with three teams remaining folded after the 1890 season. Only the New Haven Nutmegs survived after the demise of the league by transferring to another league.

=== Second demise ===
A smaller league in 1908 was also like the first league and plagued by teams failing to finish the season. Despite being the best team, Portland folded with the demise of the league and disbanded with its association with the Maine State League.

== Cities represented ==
- Attleboro, Massachusetts: Attleboro Angels (1908) – team moved from Taunton
- Baltimore, Maryland: Baltimore Orioles (1890) – not to be mistaken for the Baltimore Orioles of the American Association
- Easton, Pennsylvania: Easton (1889) – unnamed club failed to complete season and folded in June 1889
- Harrisburg, Pennsylvania: Harrisburg Athletics (1890) – former Harrisburg Ponies from the Pennsylvania State League and replaced the Jersey City Gladiators July 1890
- Hartford, Connecticut: Hartford Baseball Club (1889); Hartford Nutmeggers (1890): team disbanded August 1890
- Jersey City, New Jersey: Jersey City Skeeters (1889) Jersey City Gladiators (1890): replaced the Skeeters and then replaced by Harrisburg Athletics July 1890
- Lebanon, Pennsylvania: Lebanon (1890) – unnamed team disbanded August 25, 1890
- Lewiston, Maine: Lewiston (1908)
- Lowell, Massachusetts: Lowell (1889) – unnamed team disbanded after 1889
- New Haven, Connecticut: New Haven (1889) – unnamed team disbanded?; New Haven Nutmegs 1890: best team in the AA in 1892 but transferred to Eastern Association after end of season and last played as Eastern League's New Haven Bulldogs in 1932
- Newark, New Jersey: Newark Little Giants (1889–1890) – formerly with Eastern League, International League and Central League; club folded 1889
- Newport, Rhode Island: Newport Ponies (1908) – disbanded May 19
- Norwalk, Connecticut: Norwalk (1889) – unnamed team disbanded after single season
- Pawtucket, Rhode Island: Pawtucket Colts (1908) – originally with New England League in 1899
- Portland, Maine: Portland Blue Sox (1908) – best team in the AA in 1908, moved from Maine State League and appears to have joined New England League in 1919
- Washington D.C.: Washington Senators (1890): disbanded July 1890
- Wilkes-Barre, Pennsylvania: Wilkes-Barre Coal Barons (1889) – disbanded August 1889
- Wilmington, Delaware: Wilmington Peach Growers (1890) – disbanded August 1890
- Taunton, Massachusetts: Taunton Angels (1908) – team moved to Attleboro, MA as Angels
- Woonsocket, Rhode Island: Woonsocket Trotters (1908) – disbanded May 1908
- Worcester, Massachusetts: Worcester (1889–1890) – best team in the AA in 1889

== Standings & statistics ==
1889 Atlantic Association
schedule

Team standings	W	L	PCT	GB	Managers
Worcester	58	35	.624	-	Walt Burnham
Newark Little Giants	54	40	.574	4½	Sam Trott
Hartford	52	44	.542	7½	John Henry
New Haven	40	52	.435	17½	Harry Spence / Jack Burdock
Lowell	35	59	.373	23½	John Cosgrove / Nate Kellogg; Dan Sullivan
Wilkes-Barre Coal Barons	32	20	.605	NA	John Irwin / M.H. Bergunder
Jersey City Skeeters	33	23	.589	NA	Patrick Powers
Easton	10	26	.378	NA	Henry Putnam
Norwalk	2	17	.105	NA	Jim Donnelly / George Moolic

Norwalk disbanded September 2.
Easton disbanded June 22.
Jersey City disbanded July 25.
Wilkes-Barre disbanded August 1.

Player statistics
Player	Team	Stat	Tot	Player	Team	Stat	Tot
Robert Hamilton	Lowell	BA	.341	Jesse Burkett	Worcester	W	30
Ted Scheffler	Worcester	Runs	87	Henry Dooms	Newark	W	30
Robert Hamilton	Lowell	Hits	117	Jesse Burkett	Worcester	SO	240
William Campion	Worcester	HR	8	Bill Daley	Jersey City	Pct	.750; 18–6

1890 Atlantic Association
schedule

Team standings	W	L	PCT	GB	Managers
New Haven Nutmegs	82	36	.695	-	Walt Burnham
Worcester / Lebanon	60	51	.541	18½	Jim Cudworth
Newark Little Giants	60	61	.496	23½	Sam Trott
Jersey City Gladiators / Harrisburg Athletics	58	72	.446	30	Steve Brady / Jack Burdock; James Harrington
Baltimore Orioles	77	24	.762	NA	Billy Barnie
Washington Senators	38	47	.447	NA	Ted Sullivan
Wilmington Peach Growers	29	66	.305	NA	Barney Stephenson / Joe Simmons; Bill Wehrle
Hartford Nutmeggers	22	60	.268	NA	John Henry / Ezra Sutton; Tom Forster

Jersey City (27–46) disbanded July 22.
Harrisburg, from the disbanded Interstate League, applied for the vacant franchise and joined the league July 24.
Worcester (37–31) moved to Lebanon July 28; Washington disbanded August 2; Hartford disbanded August 25; Wilmington disbanded August 27.
Baltimore left the league to join the American Association August 27.

Player statistics
Player	Team	Stat	Tot	Player	Team	Stat	Tot
Joe Sommer	Baltimore	BA	.347	Les German	Baltimore	W	35
Reddy Mack	Baltimore	Runs	120	John Doran	New Haven	SO	241
Danny Long	Baltimore	Runs	120	John Doran	New Haven	ERA	1.12
Dan Lally	New Haven	Hits	159	Mike O'Rourke	Baltimore	Pct	.923; 12–1
Dan Lally	New Haven	HR	12				

1908 Atlantic Association

Team standings	W	L	PCT	GB	Managers
Portland Blue Sox	8	3	.727	-	F. Driscoll
Lewiston	8	4	.667	½	George Beede / Ed McDonough
Pawtucket Colts	6	3	.667	1	William Conners
Newport Ponies	5	5	.500	2½	Ben Anthony / George Reed
Taunton / Attleboro Angels	1	12	.077	8	Mike McDermott / Bill Wilson; McEleney
Woonsocket Trotters	0	1	.000	NA	John Leighton / Buster Burrell

Taunton moved to Attleboro; Woonsocket disbanded May 4; Pawtucket disbanded May 19.
The league started May 2 and disbanded May 21.

Player statistics
Player	Team	Stat	Tot	Player	Team	Stat	Tot
Billy Lush	Taunton/Attleboro	BA	.418	Sandy Burk	Pawtucket/Attleboro	W	4
Bob Black	Pawtucket	Runs	13	Sandy Burk	Pawtucket/Attleboro	SO	40
Pat Sullivan	Lewiston	Runs	13	Joe Burns	Taunton/Attleboro	Hits	16
Pat Sullivan	Lewiston	Hits	16	Pat Sullivan	Lewiston	HR	4

== Hall of Fame alumni ==
- Jesse Burkett, 1889 Worcester
- Frank Grant, 1890 Harrisburg Athletics

== See also ==
- Atlantic League (1896–1900)
- American Association (19th century)
- American Association (20th century)
