= Quincy Shipbuilders =

- 1933; Quincy, Massachusetts

Minor league affiliations
- Class: Class B (1933)
- League: New England League (1933)

Major league affiliations
- Team: Detroit Tigers (1933)

Minor league titles
- League titles (0): None

Team data
- Name: Quincy Shipbuilders (1933)
- Ballpark: Fore River Field (1933)

The Quincy Shipbuilders were a minor league baseball team based in Quincy, Massachusetts. In 1933, the Shipbuilders played briefly as members of the Class B level New England League, before relocating during the season. Quincy hosted home games at Fore River Field.

The Quincy Shipbuilders were a minor league affiliate of the Detroit Tigers.

== History ==
Minor league baseball began in Quincy, Massachusetts in 1933. The Quincy "Shipbuilders" became charter members of the six–team Class B level New England League. The Shipbuilders were joined by the Attleboro Burros, Lowell Lauriers, New Bedford Whalers, Taunton Blues and Worcester Chiefs in the 1933 reformed league play, which began on May 17, 1933.

The Quincy use of the "Shipbuilders" moniker corresponds to local industry and history. Quincy, Massachusetts was home to the Fore River Shipyard and other ship building related companies in the era.

On June 6, 1933, after beginning league play, the Quincy Shipbuilders franchise relocated. Quincy had compiled a 12–6 record when the franchise relocated to Nashua, New Hampshire, where the team became the Nashua Millionaires. Nashua moved to Brockton, Massachusetts on August 8, 1933, where the team finished the season as the Brockton Shoemakers. After compiling a 16–41 record after leaving Quincy, the team placed fifth and finished with an overall record of 28–47, playing under managers Hal Weafer, Billy Flynn and Paul Wolff in the three locations. The Quincy/Nashua/Brockton team finished 22.0 games behind the first place New Bedford Whalers (58–33) in the final 1933 League standings.

The New England League folded after the 1933 season. When the league resumed minor league play in 1946, Quincy did not field a franchise.

In 1944, a Quincy "Shipbuilders" team played in a semi–pro version of the New England League.

Quincy, Massachusetts has not hosted another minor league team.

== The ballpark ==
The 1933 Quincy Shipbuilders hosted home minor league home games at Fore River Field. Reportedly, fans passed a hat to pay admission in the 500 seat ballpark. Today, the park is still in use as a public park with ballfields. Fore River Field is located on Beechwood Street, Quincy, Massachusetts.

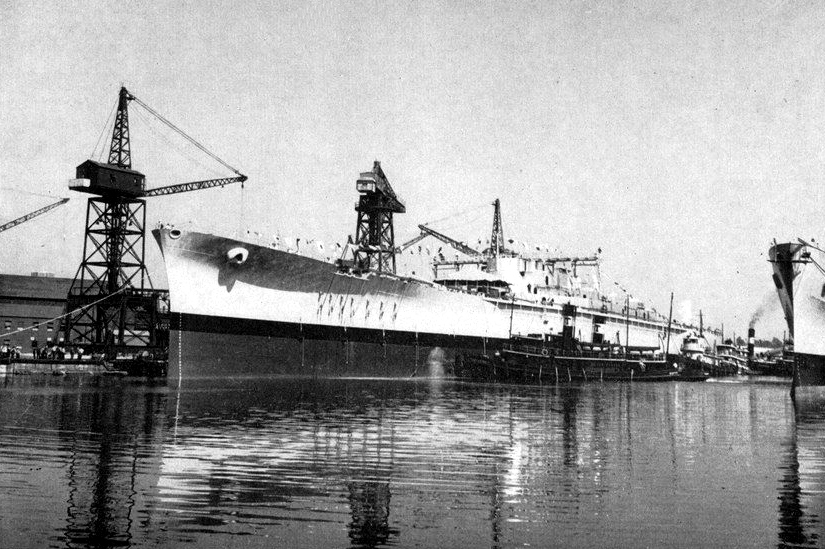
(1941) USS Massachusetts after launch at Fore River. Quincy, Massachusetts

== Year–by–year record ==
Year	Record	Finish	Manager	Playoffs/Notes
1933	28–47	5th	Hal Weafer; Billy Flynn / Paul Wolff	Quincy (12–6) moved to Nashua June 6

== Notable alumni ==
Hal Weafer (1933, MGR)
