= List of San Francisco Giants minor league affiliates =

Current San Francisco Giants domestic minor league affiliate locations

The San Francisco Giants farm system consists of seven Minor League Baseball affiliates across the United States and in the Dominican Republic. Four teams are independently owned, while three others—the Arizona Complex League Giants squads and two Dominican Summer League Giants squads—are owned by the major league club.

The Giants have been affiliated with the Single-A San Jose Giants of the California League since 1988, making it the longest-running affiliation in the organization. Their newest affiliate is the Eugene Emeralds of the Northwest League, which became the Giants' High-A club in 2021.

Geographically, San Francisco's closest domestic affiliate is the San Jose Giants, which are approximately 43 miles (69 km) away. San Francisco's furthest domestic affiliate is the Double-A Richmond Flying Squirrels of the Eastern League some 2,433 miles (3,916 km) away.

== Current affiliates ==
The San Francisco Giants farm system consists of seven minor league affiliates.

Class	Team	League	Location	Ballpark	Affiliated
Triple-A	Sacramento River Cats	Pacific Coast League	West Sacramento, California	Sutter Health Park	2015
Double-A	Richmond Flying Squirrels	Eastern League	Richmond, Virginia	CarMax Park	2010
High-A	Eugene Emeralds	Northwest League	Eugene, Oregon	PK Park	2021
Single-A	San Jose Giants	California League	San Jose, California	Excite Ballpark	1988
Rookie	ACL Giants Black	Arizona Complex League	Scottsdale, Arizona	Scottsdale Stadium	2024
Rookie	DSL Giants Black	Dominican Summer League	Boca Chica, Santo Domingo	Rawling Foundation Complex	2021
Rookie	DSL Giants Orange	Dominican Summer League	Boca Chica, Santo Domingo	Rawling Foundation Complex	2021

== Past affiliates ==
=== Key ===
Season	Each year is linked to an article about that particular Giants season.

=== 1932–1962 ===
Minor League Baseball operated with five classes (Double-A, Class A, Class B, Class C, and Class D) from 1932 to 1935. Class A1, between Double-A and Class A, was added in 1936. The minors continued to operate with these six levels through 1945. Triple-A was established as the highest classification in 1946, and Class A1 became Double-A, with Class A through D remaining. These six levels continued through 1962. The Pacific Coast League (PCL) was reclassified from Triple-A to Open in 1952 due to the possibility of becoming a third major league. This arrangement ended following the 1957 season when the relocation of the National League's Dodgers and Giants to the West Coast ended any chance of the PCL being promoted.

Season	Triple-A	Double-A	Class A	Class B	Class C	Class D	Ref.
1932	—	—	Bridgeport Bears	Winston-Salem Twins / High Point Pointers	—	—	
1933	—	—	—	Attleboro / Lawrence Weavers / Woonsocket	—	—	
1934	—	—	Nashville Volunteers	—	Jacksonville Jax	—	
1935	—	—	Nashville Volunteers	—	Tyler Trojans	Abbeville A's; Tallahassee Capitals	
1936	—	—	Memphis Chickasaws (A1)	—	Greenwood Chiefs; Muskogee Tigers; Tyler Trojans	Tallahassee Capitals	
1937	—	Jersey City Giants	—	Richmond Colts	Greenwood Giants	Blytheville Giants; Crisfield Crabbers	
1938	—	Jersey City Giants	—	Richmond Colts	Fort Smith Giants	Blytheville Giants; Milford Giants	
1939	—	Jersey City Giants	—	Clinton Giants	Fort Smith Giants	Milford Giants; Salisbury Giants	
1940	—	Jersey City Giants	Knoxville Smokies (A1)	Clinton Giants; Richmond Colts	Fort Smith Giants	Milford Giants; Salisbury Giants	
1941	—	Jersey City Giants	—	Clinton Giants	Fort Smith Giants; San Bernardino Stars	Milford Giants; Salisbury Giants	
1942	—	Jersey City Giants	Oklahoma City Indians (A1)	Jacksonville Tars	Fort Smith Giants	Bristol Twins; Oshkosh Giants; Salisbury Giants	
1943	—	Jersey City Giants	Springfield Rifles	—	—	Bristol Twins	
1944	—	Jersey City Giants	—	Richmond Colts	—	Bristol Twins; Erie Sailors; Springfield Giants	
1945	—	Jersey City Giants; San Francisco Seals	—	Richmond Colts	Danville Leafs	Bristol Twins; Erie Sailors; Hickory Rebels; Springfield Giants	
1946	Jersey City Giants; Minneapolis Millers; San Francisco Seals	—	Jacksonville Tars	Anderson A's; Manchester Giants; Richmond Colts; Trenton Giants	Danville Leafs; Erie Sailors; Fort Smith Giants; St. Cloud Rox	Bristol Twins; Hickory Rebels; Oshkosh Giants; Peekskill Highlanders; Springfield Giants	
1947	Jersey City Giants; Minneapolis Millers	—	Jacksonville Tars; Sioux City Soos	Manchester Giants; Richmond Colts; Trenton Giants	Danville Leafs; Erie Sailors; Fort Smith Giants; Reno Silver Sox	Bristol Twins; Hickory Rebels; Oshkosh Giants; Peekskill Highlanders; Seaford Eagles; Springfield Giants	
1948	Jersey City Giants; Minneapolis Millers	—	Jacksonville Tars; Sioux City Soos	Knoxville Smokies; Richmond Colts; Trenton Giants	Erie Sailors; Fort Smith Giants; Ogdensburg Maples; Quebec Alouettes; Reno Silver Sox; St. Cloud Rox	Bristol Twins; Chanute Giants; Hickory Rebels; Lawton Giants; Oshkosh Giants; Sanford Giants; Seaford Eagles; Springfield Giants	
1949	Jersey City Giants; Minneapolis Millers	—	Jacksonville Tars; Sioux City Soos	Knoxville Smokies; Richmond Colts; Trenton Giants	Erie Sailors; Fort Smith Giants; Idaho Falls Russets; Reno Silver Sox; St. Cloud Rox	Bristol Twins; Hickory Rebels; Lawton Giants; Lenoir Red Sox; Oshkosh Giants; Sanford Giants; Springfield Giants	
1950	Jersey City Giants; Minneapolis Millers	—	Jacksonville Tars; Sioux City Soos	Knoxville Smokies; Richmond Colts; Trenton Giants; Vicksburg Hill Billies	Enid Giants; Erie Sailors; Idaho Falls Russets; St. Cloud Rox	Bristol Twins; Galax Leafs; Lawton Giants; Lenoir Red Sox; Medford Rogues; Oshkosh Giants; Sanford Giant; Springfield Giants	
1951	Minneapolis Millers; Ottawa Giants	—	Jacksonville Tars; Sioux City Soos	Knoxville Smokies; Sunbury Giants	Idaho Falls Russets; Muskogee Giants; St. Cloud Rox	Bristol Twins; Lawton Giants; Lenoir Red Sox; Oshkosh Giants; Sanford Giants; Springfield Giants	
1952	Minneapolis Millers	Nashville Volunteers	Jacksonville Tars; Sioux City Soos	Knoxville Smokies; Sunbury Giants	Muskogee Giants; St. Cloud Rox	Big Stone Gap Rebels; Kingsport Cherokees; Moultrie Giants; Oshkosh Giants; Pauls Valley Raiders; Statesville Owls	
1953	Minneapolis Millers	Nashville Volunteers	Sioux City Soos	Danville Leafs	Muskogee Giants; St. Cloud Rox	Mayfield Clothiers; Oshkosh Giants; Pauls Valley Raiders	
1954	Minneapolis Millers	Nashville Volunteers	Sioux City Soos	Danville Leafs	Muskogee Giants; St. Cloud Rox	Danville Dans; Mayfield Clothiers; Olean Giants; Shelby Clippers	
1955	Minneapolis Millers	Dallas Eagles	Sioux City Soos; Wilkes-Barre Barons / Johnstown Johnnies	Danville Leafs	El Dorado Oilers; St. Cloud Rox	Mayfield Clothiers; Muskogee Giants; Sandersville Giants	
1956	Minneapolis Millers	Dallas Eagles	Albuquerque Dukes; Johnstown Johnnies	Danville Leafs	Lake Charles Giants; St. Cloud Rox	Cocoa Indians; Hastings Giants; Michigan City White Caps; Muskogee Giants; Sandersville Giants	
1957	Minneapolis Millers	Dallas Eagles	Springfield Giants	Danville Leafs	St. Cloud Rox	Hastings Giants; Michigan City White Caps; Muskogee Giants; Selma Cloverleafs	
1958	Phoenix Giants	Corpus Christi Giants	Springfield Giants	Danville Leafs	Fresno Giants; St. Cloud Rox	Artesia Giants; Hastings Giants; Michigan City White Caps; Panama City Fliers	
1959	Phoenix Giants	Corpus Christi Giants	Springfield Giants	Eugene Emeralds	Fresno Giants; St. Cloud Rox	Artesia Giants; Hastings Giants; Michigan City White Caps	
1960	Tacoma Giants	Rio Grande Valley Giants	Springfield Giants	Eugene Emeralds	Fresno Giants; Pocatello Giants	Artesia Giants; Quincy Giants; Salem Rebels	
1961	Tacoma Giants	Rio Grande Valley Giants / Victoria Giants	Springfield Giants	Eugene Emeralds	Fresno Giants; Pocatello Bannocks	Belmont Chiefs; El Paso Sun Kings; Quincy Giants; Salem Rebels	
1962	Tacoma Giants	El Paso Sun Kings	Springfield Giants	Eugene Emeralds	Fresno Giants	Decatur Commodores; Lakeland Giants; Salem Rebels	

=== 1963–1989 ===
Prior to the 1963 season, Major League Baseball (MLB) initiated a reorganization of Minor League Baseball that resulted in a reduction from six classes to four (Triple-A, Double-A, Class A, and Rookie) in response to the general decline of the minors throughout the 1950s and early-1960s when leagues and teams folded due to shrinking attendance caused by baseball fans' preference for staying at home to watch MLB games on television. The only change made within the next 27 years was Class A being subdivided for the first time to form Class A Short Season in 1966.

Season	Triple-A	Double-A	Class A	Class A Short Season	Rookie	Ref(s).
1963	Tacoma Giants	El Paso Sun Kings; Springfield Giants	Decatur Commodores; Fresno Giants; Lexington Giants	—	Salem Rebels	
1964	Tacoma Giants	El Paso Sun Kings; Springfield Giants	Decatur Commodores; Fresno Giants; Lexington Giants	—	Magic Valley Cowboys	
1965	Tacoma Giants	Springfield Giants	Decatur Commodores; Fresno Giants; Lexington Giants	—	Magic Valley Cowboys	
1966	Phoenix Giants	Waterbury Giants	Decatur Commodores; Fresno Giants; Lexington Giants	—	Magic Valley Cowboys	
1967	Phoenix Giants	Waterbury Giants	Decatur Commodores; Fresno Giants	Medford Giants	Salt Lake City Giants	
1968	Phoenix Giants	Amarillo Giants	Decatur Commodores; Fresno Giants	Medford Giants	Salt Lake City Giants	
1969	Phoenix Giants	Amarillo Giants	Decatur Commodores; Fresno Giants	—	Great Falls Giants	
1970	Phoenix Giants	Amarillo Giants	Decatur Commodores; Fresno Giants	—	Great Falls Giants	
1971	Phoenix Giants	Amarillo Giants	Decatur Commodores; Fresno Giants	—	Great Falls Giants	
1972	Phoenix Giants	Amarillo Giants	Decatur Commodores; Fresno Giants	—	Great Falls Giants	
1973	Phoenix Giants	Amarillo Giants	Decatur Commodores; Fresno Giants	—	Great Falls Giants	
1974	Phoenix Giants	Amarillo Giants	Decatur Commodores; Fresno Giants	—	Great Falls Giants	
1975	Phoenix Giants	Lafayette Drillers	Cedar Rapids Giants; Fresno Giants	—	Great Falls Giants	
1976	Phoenix Giants	Lafayette Drillers	Cedar Rapids Giants; Fresno Giants	—	Great Falls Giants	
1977	Phoenix Giants	Waterbury Giants	Cedar Rapids Giants; Fresno Giants	—	Great Falls Giants	
1978	Phoenix Giants	Waterbury Giants	Cedar Rapids Giants; Fresno Giants	—	Great Falls Giants	
1979	Phoenix Giants	Shreveport Captains	Cedar Rapids Giants; Fresno Giants	—	Great Falls Giants	
1980	Phoenix Giants	Shreveport Captains	Clinton Giants; Fresno Giants	—	Great Falls Giants	
1981	Phoenix Giants	Shreveport Captains	Clinton Giants; Fresno Giants	—	Great Falls Giants	
1982	Phoenix Giants	Shreveport Captains	Clinton Giants; Fresno Giants	—	Great Falls Giants	
1983	Phoenix Giants	Shreveport Captains	Clinton Giants; Fresno Giants	—	Great Falls Giants	
1984	Phoenix Giants	Shreveport Captains	Clinton Giants; Fresno Giants	Everett Giants	—	
1985	Phoenix Giants	Shreveport Captains	Clinton Giants; Fresno Giants	Everett Giants	—	
1986	Phoenix Firebirds	Shreveport Captains	Clinton Giants; Fresno Giants	Everett Giants	—	
1987	Phoenix Firebirds	Shreveport Captains	Clinton Giants; Fresno Giants	Everett Giants	Pocatello Giants	
1988	Phoenix Firebirds	Shreveport Captains	Clinton Giants; San Jose Giants	Everett Giants	Pocatello Giants	
1989	Phoenix Firebirds	Shreveport Captains	Clinton Giants; San Jose Giants	Everett Giants	Pocatello Giants; DSL Giants/Tigers	

=== 1990–2020 ===
Minor League Baseball operated with six classes from 1990 to 2020. In 1990, the Class A level was subdivided for a second time with the creation of Class A-Advanced. The Rookie level consisted of domestic and foreign circuits.

Season	Triple-A	Double-A	Class A-Advanced	Class A	Class A Short Season	Rookie	Foreign Rookie	Ref(s).
1990	Phoenix Firebirds	Shreveport Captains	San Jose Giants	Clinton Giants	Everett Giants	—	DSL Giants	
1991	Phoenix Firebirds	Shreveport Captains	San Jose Giants	Clinton Giants	Everett Giants	AZL Giants	DSL Giants	
1992	Phoenix Firebirds	Shreveport Captains	San Jose Giants	Clinton Giants	Everett Giants	AZL Giants	DSL Giants	
1993	Phoenix Firebirds	Shreveport Captains	San Jose Giants	Clinton Giants	Everett Giants	AZL Giants	DSL Giants/Phillies/Astros	
1994	Phoenix Firebirds	Shreveport Captains	San Jose Giants	Clinton LumberKings	Everett Giants	AZL Giants	DSL Giants/Orioles	
1995	Phoenix Firebirds	Shreveport Captains	San Jose Giants	Burlington Bees	Bellingham Giants	—	DSL Giants	
1996	Phoenix Firebirds	Shreveport Captains	San Jose Giants	Burlington Bees	Bellingham Giants	—	DSL Giants	
1997	Phoenix Firebirds	Shreveport Captains	Bakersfield Blaze; San Jose Giants	—	Salem-Keizer Volcanoes	—	DSL Giants	
1998	Fresno Grizzlies	Shreveport Captains	Bakersfield Blaze; San Jose Giants	—	Salem-Keizer Volcanoes	—	DSL Giants	
1999	Fresno Grizzlies	Shreveport Captains	Bakersfield Blaze; San Jose Giants	—	Salem-Keizer Volcanoes	—	DSL Giants	
2000	Fresno Grizzlies	Shreveport Captains	Bakersfield Blaze; San Jose Giants	—	Salem-Keizer Volcanoes	AZL Giants	DSL Giants	
2001	Fresno Grizzlies	Shreveport Swamp Dragons	San Jose Giants	Hagerstown Suns	Salem-Keizer Volcanoes	AZL Giants	DSL Giants	
2002	Fresno Grizzlies	Shreveport Swamp Dragons	San Jose Giants	Hagerstown Suns	Salem-Keizer Volcanoes	AZL Giants	DSL Giants	
2003	Fresno Grizzlies	Norwich Navigators	San Jose Giants	Hagerstown Suns	Salem-Keizer Volcanoes	AZL Giants	DSL Giants	
2004	Fresno Grizzlies	Norwich Navigators	San Jose Giants	Hagerstown Suns	Salem-Keizer Volcanoes	AZL Giants	DSL Giants	
2005	Fresno Grizzlies	Norwich Navigators	San Jose Giants	Augusta GreenJackets	Salem-Keizer Volcanoes	AZL Giants	DSL Giants	
2006	Fresno Grizzlies	Connecticut Defenders	San Jose Giants	Augusta GreenJackets	Salem-Keizer Volcanoes	AZL Giants	DSL Giants	
2007	Fresno Grizzlies	Connecticut Defenders	San Jose Giants	Augusta GreenJackets	Salem-Keizer Volcanoes	AZL Giants	DSL Giants	
2008	Fresno Grizzlies	Connecticut Defenders	San Jose Giants	Augusta GreenJackets	Salem-Keizer Volcanoes	AZL Giants	DSL Giants	
2009	Fresno Grizzlies	Connecticut Defenders	San Jose Giants	Augusta GreenJackets	Salem-Keizer Volcanoes	AZL Giants	DSL Giants	
2010	Fresno Grizzlies	Richmond Flying Squirrels	San Jose Giants	Augusta GreenJackets	Salem-Keizer Volcanoes	AZL Giants	DSL Giants	
2011	Fresno Grizzlies	Richmond Flying Squirrels	San Jose Giants	Augusta GreenJackets	Salem-Keizer Volcanoes	AZL Giants	DSL Giants	
2012	Fresno Grizzlies	Richmond Flying Squirrels	San Jose Giants	Augusta GreenJackets	Salem-Keizer Volcanoes	AZL Giants	DSL Giants	
2013	Fresno Grizzlies	Richmond Flying Squirrels	San Jose Giants	Augusta GreenJackets	Salem-Keizer Volcanoes	AZL Giants	DSL Giants	
2014	Fresno Grizzlies	Richmond Flying Squirrels	San Jose Giants	Augusta GreenJackets	Salem-Keizer Volcanoes	AZL Giants	DSL Giants	
2015	Sacramento River Cats	Richmond Flying Squirrels	San Jose Giants	Augusta GreenJackets	Salem-Keizer Volcanoes	AZL Giants	DSL Giants	
2016	Sacramento River Cats	Richmond Flying Squirrels	San Jose Giants	Augusta GreenJackets	Salem-Keizer Volcanoes	AZL Giants	DSL Giants	
2017	Sacramento River Cats	Richmond Flying Squirrels	San Jose Giants	Augusta GreenJackets	Salem-Keizer Volcanoes	AZL Giants	DSL Giants	
2018	Sacramento River Cats	Richmond Flying Squirrels	San Jose Giants	Augusta GreenJackets	Salem-Keizer Volcanoes	AZL Giants Black; AZL Giants Orange	DSL Giants	
2019	Sacramento River Cats	Richmond Flying Squirrels	San Jose Giants	Augusta GreenJackets	Salem-Keizer Volcanoes	AZL Giants Black; AZL Giants Orange	DSL Giants	
2020 (Note: The 2020 Minor League Baseball season was cancelled due to the COVID-19 pandemic.)	Sacramento River Cats	Richmond Flying Squirrels	San Jose Giants	Augusta GreenJackets	Salem-Keizer Volcanoes	AZL Giants Black; AZL Giants Orange	DSL Giants Black; DSL Giants Orange	

=== 2021–present ===
The current structure of Minor League Baseball is the result of an overall contraction of the system beginning with the 2021 season. Class A was reduced to two levels: High-A and Low-A. Low-A was reclassified as Single-A in 2022.

Season	Triple-A	Double-A	High-A	Single-A	Rookie	Foreign Rookie	Ref.
2021	Sacramento River Cats	Richmond Flying Squirrels	Eugene Emeralds	San Jose Giants	ACL Giants Black; ACL Giants Orange	DSL Giants Black; DSL Giants Orange	
2022	Sacramento River Cats	Richmond Flying Squirrels	Eugene Emeralds	San Jose Giants	ACL Giants Black; ACL Giants Orange	DSL Giants Black; DSL Giants Orange	
2023	Sacramento River Cats	Richmond Flying Squirrels	Eugene Emeralds	San Jose Giants	ACL Giants Black; ACL Giants Orange	DSL Giants Black; DSL Giants Orange	
2024	Sacramento River Cats	Richmond Flying Squirrels	Eugene Emeralds	San Jose Giants	ACL Giants	DSL Giants Black; DSL Giants Orange	
2025	Sacramento River Cats	Richmond Flying Squirrels	Eugene Emeralds	San Jose Giants	ACL Giants	DSL Giants Black; DSL Giants Orange	
2026	Sacramento River Cats	Richmond Flying Squirrels	Eugene Emeralds	San Jose Giants	ACL Giants	DSL Giants Black; DSL Giants Orange	
