= History of Pawtucket Baseball =

Professional baseball was played in Pawtucket, Rhode Island, for 67 years spanning 1892 through 2019.

== Before World War I ==
The first team to call Pawtucket home, the Pawtucket Secrets of the New England League, disbanded on July 26, 1892, with a dismal 17–43 record. The team played its games on the Dexter Street grounds, which housed two other Pawtucket teams in the New England League through 1899.

Following the Secrets (1892), the Pawtucket Maroons (1894–1895, 1897–1899) and Pawtucket Phenoms (1896) called Pawtucket home. After the Maroons were expelled in August 1899, Pawtucket would be without baseball until 1908, although the Pawtucket Colts of the Class C Atlantic Association lasted only nine games before disbanding and leaving Pawtucket without a team for six more seasons.

In 1914 the Pawtucket Rovers joined the Class C Colonial League, playing their games at the Sabin Street grounds in the Royal Square area, but were kicked out in August 1915 because of an affiliation with a competing league.

The city did not field a team in Organized Baseball from that point through 1945.

== World War II through 2020 ==
=== New England League (1946–1949) ===
McCoy Stadium, named in honor of Thomas P. McCoy, mayor of Pawtucket from 1936 to 1945, was dedicated just in time for the return of professional baseball in 1946 as the Pawtucket Slaters of the Class B New England League, an affiliate of the Boston Braves of the National League, debuted. The Slaters lasted four full seasons; they led the New England League in attendance (92,787) in 1947, made the league playoffs every season, and compiled a composite record of 279–221 (a winning percentage of .558). However, after the 1949 campaign, the league disbanded and eight-year-old McCoy Stadium was left without a permanent tenant.

=== Eastern League (1966–1967, 1970–1972) ===
That would change in 1966 when the Cleveland Indians' Double-A Eastern League team relocated from Reading, Pennsylvania, to become the Pawtucket Indians. The Tribe spent two seasons in Pawtucket, compiling a record of 135–142, before moving to Waterbury, Connecticut. But professional baseball, and the Eastern League, would return to McCoy in 1970 when the Pittsfield Red Sox transferred to the city—beginning a 50-year relationship with the Boston Red Sox and creating the Pawtucket Red Sox, popularly nicknamed the "PawSox."

=== International League (1973–2019) ===
After three seasons (1970–72) as the host to Boston's Eastern League affiliate, Pawtucket became home to Boston's Triple-A operation with the 1973 transfer of the Louisville Colonels of the International League. The 1973 PawSox were the first Pawtucket team ever to win a Governors' Cup championship, a feat they would repeat in 1984, 2012 and 2014. They also led the International League in attendance in 2004, 2005 and 2008. However, the "PawSox" moved to Worcester, Massachusetts, in 2021 after the team and the Rhode Island General Assembly could not agree on a financing plan for a new ballpark that had been proposed for downtown Pawtucket. The team played its final game in September 2019, with its planned farewell season, 2020, falling victim to the shutdown of minor league baseball due to the COVID-19 pandemic.

Including both their Eastern League and International League editions, the Pawtucket Red Sox' regular season record over the half-century of their existence was 3,461–3,610, for a winning percentage of .490.
