= Baltimore Orioles (Atlantic Association) =

- 1890; Baltimore, Maryland

Minor league affiliations
- Class: Independent (1890)
- League: Atlantic Association (1890)

Major league affiliations
- Team: None

Minor league titles
- League titles (0): None

Team data
- Name: Baltimore Orioles (1890)
- Ballpark: Oriole Park (1890); Acton's Park (1890)

The Baltimore Orioles of the 1890 Atlantic Association were a minor league baseball team based in Baltimore, Maryland. The 1890 Orioles were a short–lived member of the Atlantic Association, before the franchise rejoined the American Association during the season. The team hosted home minor league games at Oriole Park.

== History ==
After eight seasons, the Baltimore Orioles of the Major League level American Association left that league after the 1889 season. Keeping the Baltimore Orioles moniker, the franchise became members of the 1890 Atlantic Association, an Independent level minor league baseball league.

The 1890 Baltimore Orioles were owned by local brewery tycoon Harry Von der Horst and managed by Billy Barnie.

On August 27, 1890, the Baltimore Orioles were in first place in the eight–team Atlantic Association league standings, with a record of 77–24, when they left the Atlantic Association to rejoin the American Association and began play immediately. The Wilmington Peach Growers folded from the Atlantic Association on the same day. During their time of playing in the Atlantic Association, the Orioles had season attendance of 71,500, an average of 1,075 per game at Oriole Park. While playing in the Atlantic Association, the Orioles were fined for "Sunday baseball violations."

On Sunday, June 15, 1890, the Baltimore Orioles deliberately defied a Maryland state law prohibiting residents from working on Sunday. Playing the game at Acton's Park in Brooklyn, Maryland, the Orioles drew 6,065 fans to the ballpark. After an 11-8 victory over the Hartford Nutmeggers, Oriole Manager Billy Barnie was arrested at the conclusion of the game. Anne Arundel County Sheriff James S. Armiger and Deputy James T. Small carried out the arrest after Armiger was advised by State’s Attorney James Munroe that he must enforce the law. Since the Orioles charged admission and paid the players, it was deemed an illegal act. For his part, Barnie was jailed overnight on a $300.00 bail. Samuel G. Acton, owner of the ballpark, bailed Barnie out of jail. Barnie was fined $5.00.

As the American Association (AA) began play without the Orioles in 1890, the AA’s Brooklyn Gladiators franchise folded mid-season with a 26–73 record. The Orioles immediately left the Atlantic Association on August 27, 1890 and returned to the American Association. The Orioles played the rest of the American Association season, replacing Brooklyn and compiling a 15–19 record. After Baltimore left the league, the New Haven Nutmegs won the Atlantic Association championship with a 82–36 record.

== The ballparks ==
(1889) Oriole Park Diagram. Baltimore, Maryland

The 1890 Baltimore Orioles continued play at Oriole Park. The ballpark was the second location of "Oriole Park." Oriole park was located on a site at 10th Street (renamed 29th Street) & York Road (Greenmount Avenue), Baltimore, Maryland.

During June and early July, the Orioles played several Sunday games, in direct defiance of a Maryland law prohibiting work on Sunday. The games were staged at Acton's Park, an amusement park which was located in the Brooklyn neighborhood at the foot of the Long Bridge. The game of June 15 drew over 6,000 fans. Local authorities then arrested Barnie for violating this "blue law". The issue was debated in court for several more weeks, and a few more sunday games were played in the interim.

== Timeline ==
| Year(s) | # Yrs. | Team | Level | League |
|---|---|---|---|---|
| 1890 (1) | 1 | Baltimore Orioles | Independent | Atlantic Association |
| 1890 (2) | 1 | Baltimore Orioles | Major League | American Association |

== Year–by–year record ==
| Year | Record | Finish | Manager | Playoffs/Notes |
|---|---|---|---|---|
| 1890 | 77–24 | 1st* | Billy Barnie | Left Atlantic Association August 27 |

== Notable alumni ==
- Norm Baker (1890)
- Billy Barnie (1890, MGR)
- Les German (1890)
- George Henry (1890)
- John Kerins (1890)
- Dan Long (1890)
- Reddy Mack (1890)
- Sadie McMahon (1890)
- Mike O'Rourke (1890)
- Tom Power (1890)
- Irv Ray (1890)
- Sam Shaw (1890)
- Joe Sommer (1890)
- Pop Tate (1890)
- George Townsend (1890)
- Joe Werrick (1890)

== See also ==
Baltimore Orioles (Atlantic Association) players
1890 Baltimore Orioles season
