= Taunton, Massachusetts minor league baseball history =

Taunton, Massachusetts minor league baseball teams
- 1897–1933; (1897–1899, 1905, 1908, 1914–1915, 1933); Taunton, Massachusetts

Minor league affiliations
- Class: Class B (1897–1899); Class D (1905, 1908); Class C (1914–1915); Class D (1933)
- League: New England League (1896–1899, 1905); Atlantic Association (1908); Colonial League (1914–1915); New England League (1933)

Major league affiliations
- Team: None

Minor league titles
- League titles (0): None

Team data
- Name: Taunton Herrings (1896–1910); Taunton Tigers (1905); Taunton Angels (1908); Taunton Herrings (1914–1915); Taunton Blues (1933)
- Ballpark: Taunton Fairgrounds (1897–1899, 1905, 1908, 1914–1915, 1933); Hopewell Park (1933)

Minor league baseball teams were based in Taunton, Massachusetts between 1897 and 1933. Taunton teams played as members of the New England League from 1896 to 1899 and 1905, the Atlantic Association in 1908, Colonial League in 1914 and 1915 and the New England League in 1933. Taunton teams hosted minor league home games at the Taunton Fairgrounds. Some 1933 games were played at Hopewell Park

Baseball Hall of Fame member Christy Mathewson played for the 1899 Taunton Herrings, in his first season of professional baseball.

== History ==
In 1897, the Taunton Herrings began minor league play. Taunton became members of the six–team Class B level New England League. After beginning play on May 1, 1897, Taunton finished their first season of play in fifth place. The Herrings had a record of 40–68, playing under manager John Irwin and finished 30.5 games behind the first place Brockton Shoemakers and Newport Colts, who ended the season in tie atop the New England League final standings.

Continuing play in the 1898 six–team Class B level New England League, the Taunton Herrings placed last in the standings. The league stopped play on July 5, 1898. The Herrings ended the season with a record of 15–33 to place sixth under manager Frank Leonard. Taunton finished 17.0 games behind the first place Brockton Shoemakers in the final standings.

The 1899 New England League expanded to eight teams, but four folded during the season. With a 34–67 final record, the Taunton Herrings placed fourth among the four remaining teams. Playing under managers Bobby Moore and George Grant, the Herrings finished 27.5 games behind the first place Portland Phenoms. Baseball Hall of Fame member Christy Mathewson played for the 1899 Taunton Herrings in his first professional season, while a student at Bucknell University. At the conclusion of the season, Taunton players held an exhibition game to raise funds for return trips home. The New England League did not play in the 1900 season. In 17 games, Mathewson compiled a 2–13 record and gave up 106 runs in 130 innings at age 19.

Taunton was without a minor league team until rejoining the 1905 New England League during the season. On August 3, 1905. the Lowell Tigers moved to Taunton with a 24–46 record. The final New England League standings saw the Lowell/Taunton Tigers finish last in the eight–team league. With a 4–36 record in Taunton, the team finished with an overall record of 28–82 to place eighth under managers William Connor and George Grant. Taunton finished 41.5 games behind the first place Concord Marines.

In 1908, the Taunton Angels played briefly as members of the Atlantic Association. The Angles had a record of 1–12 record under managers Mike McDermott, Bill Wilson and McEleney. The Taunton franchise moved to Attleboro, Massachusetts. The league disbanded on May 21, 1908.

In 1914, the Taunton Herrings joined the Colonial League, which played the 1914 season as a six–team Class C level league. The Taunton Herrings ended the 1914 season with a record of 44–54 and placed fifth. Under managers Ambrose Kane and Thomas Gilroy, Taunton finished 17.5 behind the first place Fall River Spindles.

The Herrings continued play in the 1915 Colonial League, but folded midway through the season. On July 10, 1915, Taunton finished with a 14–28 record as the team folded. Thomas Gilroy was the manager.

In 1933, Taunton returned to play a final season as members of the six–team Class B level New England League. The Taunton Blues placed fourth in the standings with a record of 43–48, playing under managers Kenneth Black and Bill Duggan. The Blues finished 22.0 games behind the New Bedford Whalers. The Taunton franchise permanently folded following the 1933 season.

Taunton, Massachusetts has not hosted another minor league team.

== The ballparks ==
All Taunton minor league teams were noted to have played home games at the Taunton Fairgrounds. The ballpark was located within the Bristol Fairgrounds, on Dewert Avenue near Smith Avenue and Kilmer Avenue. The remaining fairgrounds buildings were razed in 2014. Today, the site is residential.

In 1933, the Taunton Blues reportedly played some home games at Hopewell Park. The ballpark was located at Hopewell Street & Exeter Street in Taunton, Massachusetts. Hopewell Park is still in use today as a public park with baseball and softball fields and other amenities within the park.

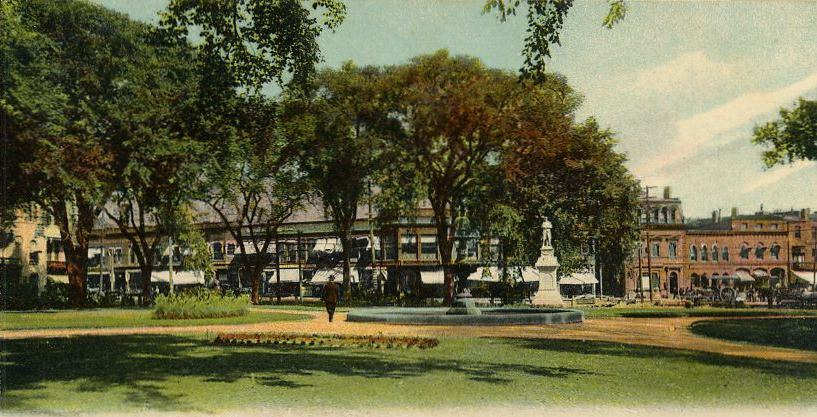
(1905) Taunton Green, Taunton, MA

== Timeline ==
Year(s)	# Yrs.	Team	Level	League	Ballpark
1897–1899	3	Taunton Herrings	Class B	New England League	Taunton Fairgrounds
1905	1	Taunton Tigers	Class B	New England League	Taunton Fairgrounds
1908	1	Taunton Angels	Class D	Atlantic Association	Taunton Fairgrounds
1914–1915	2	Taunton Herrings	Class C	Colonial League	Taunton Fairgrounds
1933	1	Taunton Blues	Class B	New England League	Taunton Fairgrounds

== Year-by-year records ==
Year	Record	Finish	Manager	Playoffs/notes
1897	40–68	5th	John Irwin	No playoffs held
1898	15–33	6th	Frank Leonard	No playoffs held
1899	34–67	4th	Bobby Moore / George Grant	No playoffs held
1905	28–82	8th	William Connor / George Grant	Lowell (4–36) moved to Taunton August 3
1908	1–12	NA	Mike McDermott; Bill Wilson / McEleney	Taunton moved to Attleboro; League disbanded May 21
1914	44–54	5th	Ambrose Kane / Thomas Gilroy	No playoffs held
1915	14–28	NA	Thomas Gilroy	Team folded July 10
1933	43–48	4th	Kenneth Black / Bill Duggan	No playoffs held

== Notable alumni ==
- Christy Mathewson (1899) Inducted Baseball Hall of Fame, 1936
- Larry Battam (1898)
- Bill Bergen (1898)
- Curt Bernard (1899)
- Dan Burke (1897)
- Buster Burrell (1899)
- Charlie Carr (1898)
- Win Clark (1898)
- Lem Cross (1905)
- Ira Davis (1897)
- Bill Delaney (1897)
- Tom Drohan (1908)
- Bill Eagle (1899)
- Welcome Gaston (1897)
- Ed Glenn (1899)
- Paddy Greene (1899)
- Joe Harrington (1897)
- Jack Horner (1898)
- Happy Iott (1899)
- John Irwin (1897, MGR)
- Jack Katoll (1898)
- John Leighton (1897)
- Ezra Lincoln (1899)
- Ed MacGamwell (1897-1898)
- Mike Mahoney (1899)
- Willard Mains (1898)
- Gene McAuliffe (1897)
- Pete McBride (1897)
- Sandy McDougal (1897-1898)
- Sam McMackin (1898)
- Bill Merritt (1905)
- Tom O'Brien (1898)
- Ray Nelson (1899)
- Paul Russell (1899)
- Hank Simon (1897-1989)
- Tom Smith (1899)
- Tom Stouch (1899)
- Joe Wall (1905)
- Nick Wise (1897)

== See also ==
- Taunton Herrings players
- Taunton Tigers players
