= George Stovey =

American baseball player

- Pitcher
- Born: May 1866; Williamsport, Pennsylvania, U.S.
- Died: March 22, 1936 (aged 69); Williamsport, Pennsylvania, U.S.
- Batted: Left Threw: Left

debut
- 1886, for the Cuban Giants

Last appearance
- 1897, for the Williamsport Demorest Bicycle Boys
- Stats at Baseball Reference

Teams
- Cuban Giants (1886, 1888–1891, 1893); Jersey City Skeeters (1886); Newark Little Giants (1887); Worcester Grays (1888); New York Gorhams (1889, 1891); Cuban X-Giants (1896); Brooklyn Colored Giants (1896); Williamsport Demorest Bicycle Boys (1897)

George Washington Stovey (May 1866 – March 22, 1936) was an American professional baseball pitcher from Williamsport, Pennsylvania. Stovey is widely considered the greatest African-American pitcher of the 19th century, but discrimination barred him from the majors, forcing him to play for various minor league teams throughout the 1880s and 1890s. Stovey was reportedly a target of the New York Giants to play in the majors in 1887.

== Career ==
In 1907, black player-turned-sportswriter Sol White alluded to a supposed effort in 1887 by New York to sign Stovey. White, writing in a baseball book bearing his name, stated that "arrangements were about completed for his transfer from the Newark club, when a brawl was heard from Chicago to New York. Cap Anson, with all the venom of hate which would be worthy of a (Benjamin) Tillman or a (James) Vardaman of the present day, made strenuous and fruitful opposition to any proposition looking to the admittance of a colored man in the National League." In prefacing his story, White said, "Were it not for this same man Anson, there would have been a colored player in the National League in 1887."

However, there are other accounts from 1887 which seem to cast some doubt on the assertions of White that are detailed above, particularly concerning what role Cap Anson played in the controversy.

On April 9, 1887, the Newark Journal said New York Giants manager Jim Mutrie offered to buy Stovey and teammate and fellow black Moses Fleetwood Walker, who were now both with Newark of the International League, "but [Newark] Manager [Charley] Hackett informed him they were not on [sic] sale."

The day before that report, Newark and New York had met at the Polo Grounds, and Stovey and Walker had played (New York Sun, April 8, 1887). Presumably, Mutrie made his offer after the seeing the game. If so, since a single day elapsed between the game and the offer's rejection by Newark manager Hackett, it is highly unlikely that Anson, who was in St. Louis, would have weighed in.

In addition, Stovey was part of a far more acute controversy leading up to the 1887 season. It involved Newark and Jersey City, and reveals that Newark had no interest in selling him during the period in which White blamed Anson.

Anson and Stovey did cross paths later in 1887, when, according to contemporaneous reporting, on July 14, 1887, following a vote that morning by International League owners to approve no more contracts with black players, in a home exhibition game against Chicago that afternoon, Newark's Stovey and fellow black teammate Walker sat out because of Anson's objection.

Both Stovey and Walker had played on July 11. The day of the Chicago game, the Newark News listed Stovey as the scheduled pitcher. Then, in its recap, it said, "Stovey was to have pitched for Newark, but he complained of sickness, and so [Micky] [sic] Hughes was substituted." Stovey did not play again until July 17, and Walker not until July 26. (Newark Journal, July 12–27, 1887; Newark News, July 14–15, 1887.)

A few days after the game with Chicago, the Newark Sunday Call said, "Stovey was expected to pitch in the Chicago game. It was announced on the ground [sic] that he was sulking, but it has since been given out that Anson objected to a colored man playing. If this be true, and the crowd had known it, Mr. Anson would have received hisses instead of the applause that was given him when he first stepped to the bat.(Newark Sunday Call, July 17, 1887; New York Telegram, July 18, 1887.)

In 1889 he pitched for both the Cuban Giants, based at Trenton, New Jersey, and the New York Gorhams, based in Philadelphia. In 1891 he played for the Cuban Giants at Ansonia. These were all-black teams playing in organized baseball in those two seasons. He also played some in the outfield, batting 256 in a total of 122 games.

== Statistics ==
- 1886 Jersey City Jerseys Eastern League 31 G, 270 IP, 16-15, 1.13 ERA, 203 K, 43 BB
- 1887 Newark Little Giants International League 48 G, 424 IP, 34-14, 2.46 ERA (Some sources list Stovey with an all-time IL-record 35 wins; some list 33 wins. Either way he led the league.)
- 1888 Worcester Grays New England League 11 G, 98 IP, 6-5, 2.30 ERA (also played with the Cuban Giants)
- 1889 Trenton/Philadelphia Mid State League 7 G, 45 IP, 1-4, 4.40 ERA
- 1890 Troy Trojans New York State League 2 G, 18 IP, 1-1, 2.00 ERA
- 1891 Ansonia Connecticut State League 3 G, 27 IP, 2-1, 4.00 ERA

== Death ==
Buried in Wildwood Cemetery section G (Poor Ground) Lot 6, March 26, 1936

== See also ==
- Racism in the United States
- Discrimination based on skin tone
