= Woonsocket Speeders =

- 1891–1933; (1891–1892, 1908, 1914, 1933); Woonsocket, Rhode Island

Minor league affiliations
- Class: Independent (1891); Class B (1892); Class D (1908); Class C (1914); Class D (1933)
- League: New England League (1891–1892); Atlantic Association (1908); Colonial League (1914); New England League (1933)

Major league affiliations
- Team: New York Giants (1933)

Minor league titles
- League titles (1): 1892

Team data
- Name: Woonsocket (1891–1892); Woonsocket Trotters (1908); Woonsocket Speeders (1914); Woonsocket (1933)
- Ballpark: Woonsocket Trotting Park (1908); Clinton Oval (1914)

The Woonsocket Speeders were a minor league baseball team based in Woonsocket, Rhode Island. Between 1891 and 1933, Woonsocket teams played as members of the New England League from 1891 to 1892, Atlantic Association in 1908, Colonial League in 1914 and New England League in 1933. Woonsocket won the 1892 New England League championship. In 1933 Woonsocket was a minor league affiliate of the New York Giants.

== History ==
In the 1891 season, Woonsocket first began minor league play, as the team joined the six–team Independent level New England League on June 10, 1891 during the season. The Lewiston franchise joined the league on the same day, as the league expanded to eight teams. The 1891 Woonsocket team finished with a 11–23 record, playing under manager Tom Rowe.

Woonsocket continued play in 1892, capturing the New England League championship in the eight–team Class B level league. The 1892 Woonsocket team ended the regular season with a 63–31 record to place 1st in the standings under player/manager Thomas O'Brien. Woonsocket finished 7.0 games ahead of 2nd place Portland in the final standings. Hi Ladd of Woonsocket led the New England League in total hits with 140 and teammate Tom O'Brien led the league with 106 runs. Despite winning the championship, the Woonsocket franchise folded from the New England League following the season.

The 1908 Woonsocket Trotters played very briefly as charter members of the short-lived Class D level Atlantic Association. Woonsocket had a reported record of 0–1 when the team folded on May 4, 1909, after playing the one game under managers John Leighton and Buster Burrell. The entire league folded on May 21, 1908.

Minor league baseball returned in 1914, when the Woonsocket Speeders became charter members of the 1914 six–team Class C level Colonial League. The Fall River Spindles of the Colonial League ended the 1914 season with a record of 49–48, finishing 12.0 games behind the first place Fall River Spindles, as Roy Dickinson and Tom Walsh served as managers of the Woonsocket Speeders team. Joe Gaudette of Woonsocket led the league in hitting and total hits, batting .321 with 117 hits. The Woonsocket did not return to the 1915 Colonial League.

In 1933, "Woonsocket" returned to play during the season. On July 18, 1933, Woonsocket became members the Class B level New England League when the Lawrence Weavers moved to Woonsocket. If there was a team moniker in 1933 it is not referenced. Woonsocket played as a minor league affiliate of the New York Giants. The Woonsocket team finished with a record of 12–24 in Woonsocket and 27–50 overall, placing sixth in the final standings under manager Mark Devlin. It was reported that Skinny Graham hit .409 for the season, playing for the Lawrence/Woonsocket team. The Woonsocket franchise did not return to the 1934 New England League.

Woonsocket has not hosted another minor league team.

== The ballpark ==
The name of the Woonsocket home minor league ballpark(s) is the Clinton Oval.

== Timeline ==
Year(s)	# Yrs.	Team	Level	League	Affiliate
1891	1	Woonsocket	Independent	New England League	None
1892	1	Woonsocket	Class B	New England League	None
1908	1	Woonsocket Trappers	Class D	Atlantic Association	None
1914	1	Woonsocket Speeders	Class C	Colonial League	None
1933	1	Woonsocket	Class B	New England League	New York Giants

== Year–by–year records ==
Year	Record	Place	Manager	Playoffs/notes
1891	11–23	NA	Tom Rowe	Team joined league June 12
1892	63–31	1st	Tom O'Brien	League champions
1908	0–1	NA	John Leighton / Buster Burrell	Team disbanded May 4
1914	49–48	3rd	Roy Dickinson / Tom Walsh	No playoffs held
1933	27–50	6th	Mark Devlin	Lawrence (12–24) moved to Woonsocket July 18

== Notable alumni ==
- Bob Barr (1892)
- Buster Burrell (1892), (1908, MGR)
- Frank Connaughton (1891–1892)
- Skinny Graham (1933)
- Joe Harrington (1892)
- Hi Ladd (1892)
- John Leighton (1892), (1908, MGR)
- Sandy McDermott (1891)
- Bill Merritt (1891)
- Hugh Mulcahy (1933) MLB All-Star
- Tom O'Brien (1892)
- Frank Sexton (1891)
- John Stafford (1891–1892)
- Woonsocket (minor league baseball) players
