= Boulevard Park (Worcester, Massachusetts) =

Former baseball park in Worcester, Massachusetts

Coordinates: 42.2662°N 71.7838°W

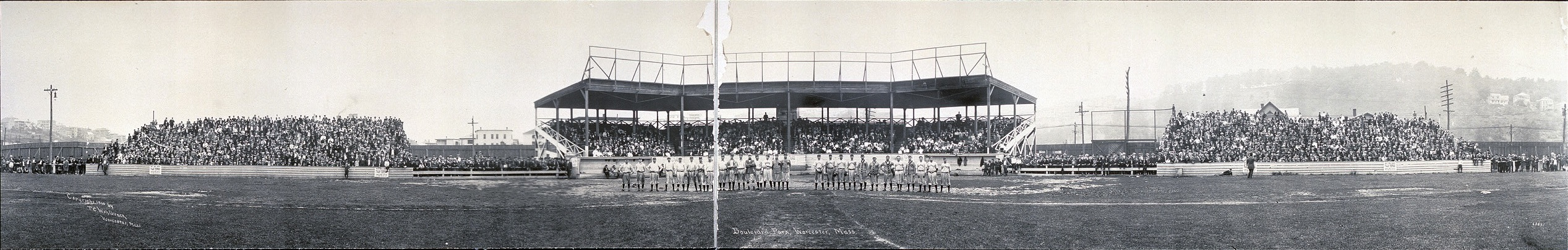
Boulevard Park, circa 1910.

Boulevard Park was a ballpark located in Worcester, Massachusetts, United States. It served as the home park of the Worcester Busters, Worcester Boosters and Worcester Panthers. It lasted approximately two decades, opening on April 19, 1906, and burning in 1926. The capacity of the ballpark was 3,500.

The field was located near the intersection of Shrewsbury Street and Casco Street, just east of Union Station. The location is now occupied by a shopping plaza.
