= Williamsport Demorest Bicycle Boys =

The Williamsport Demorest Bicycle Boys were a minor league baseball team located in Williamsport, Pennsylvania. They played in the Central Pennsylvania League in 1896 and 1897. The team's roster included Ossee Schrecongost and George Stovey.
