= George Yeager =

American baseball player (1874–1940)

- Catcher
- Born: June 5, 1874; Cincinnati, Ohio, U.S.
- Died: July 5, 1940 (aged 66); Cincinnati, Ohio, U.S.
- Batted: Right Threw: Right

MLB debut
- September 25, 1896, for the Boston Beaneaters

Last MLB appearance
- August 5, 1902, for the Baltimore Orioles

MLB statistics
- Batting average: .238
- Home runs: 5
- Runs batted in: 73
- Stats at Baseball Reference

Teams
- Boston Beaneaters (1896–99); Cleveland Blues (1901); Pittsburgh Pirates (1901); New York Giants (1902); Baltimore Orioles (1902)

Career highlights and awards
- 3x National League pennant winner (1897, 1898, 1901)

George J. "Doc" Yeager (June 4, 1874 – July 5, 1940) was an American professional baseball player. He played all or part of six seasons in Major League Baseball, primarily as a catcher. He played for the Boston Beaneaters from 1896 to 1899, the Cleveland Blues in 1901, the Pittsburgh Pirates in 1901, the New York Giants in 1902, and the Baltimore Orioles in 1902. During his career, he was measured at 5 ft 10 in (1.78 m) and weighing 190 lbs.

== Biography ==
Yeager was born in Cincinnati, to Henry Yeager and the former Anna Leister. In his youth, he played on amateur baseball teams in the Cincinnati area, and after receiving several minor league offers, he signed with New Haven in 1894. For most of the next three seasons, however, he played with the Pawtucket Phenoms of the New England League. In 1896, Yeager had a good season at Pawtucket, batting .345 with 24 home runs and 36 stolen bases. He made his major league debut with the Boston Beaneaters that September.

Yeager was a backup catcher to Marty Bergen in 1897 and 1898 but also played other positions in the field for Boston. He batted .242 and then .267. Led by several future Hall of Famers, the Beaneaters won the National League pennant both years. In 1899, Boston released Yeager, and he spent most of that season with the Eastern League's Worcester Farmers. In 1900, he signed with Connie Mack's Milwaukee Brewers of the American League, which was a minor league at the time. Yeager started off hot at the plate and hit .387 through 19 games, by far the highest batting average of his career. However, he then tore some ligaments in his knee and was sidelined for the rest of 1900.

Yeager began 1901 with the Cleveland Blues, hit poorly, was released, and then finished out the season with the Pittsburgh Pirates. In 1902, Yeager played for both the New York Giants and Baltimore Orioles, but he did not stick with those clubs, either. He played his last major league game on August 5, 1902.

From 1903 to 1909, Yeager was a catcher in the minor leagues. With the American Association's Minneapolis Millers, he batted over .300 for the last time in 1903. He also played for the St. Paul Saints and Toledo Mud Hens. In 1907, he went to Des Moines of the Western League and batted .286. His batting average fell to .212 the following season, and he retired soon afterwards.

After his baseball career ended, Yeager became a switch tender for the Southern Rail Road Company. He was married to Tillie Stadtlander.

Yeager died in 1940 of a cerebral hemorrhage and was buried in Spring Grove Cemetery.
