= Normie Roy =

American baseball player (1928-2011)

- Pitcher
- Born: November 15, 1928; Newton, Massachusetts, U.S.
- Died: March 22, 2011 (aged 82); Nashua, New Hampshire, U.S.
- Batted: Right Threw: Right

MLB debut
- April 23, 1950, for the Boston Braves

Last MLB appearance
- September 27, 1950, for the Boston Braves

MLB statistics
- Win–loss record: 4–3
- Earned run average: 5.13
- Innings pitched: 59 2/3
- Stats at Baseball Reference

Teams
- Boston Braves (1950)

Norman Brooks Roy III (November 15, 1928 – March 22, 2011) was an American Major League Baseball pitcher. Nicknamed "Jumbo" and listed at 6 feet (1.83 m) and 200 pounds (90.7 kg), he batted and threw right-handed.

Roy was born in Newton, Massachusetts, and grew up in Waltham, where he attended Waltham High School. He was signed by the Boston Braves in 1947, and spent four years with Class-B Pawtucket Slaters (1947) and AAA Milwaukee Brewers (1948–49, 1951) before joining the Braves in the 1950 season.

Roy posted a 4–3 record and a 5.13 ERA in 19 appearances for the Braves, including six starts, two complete games and one save. He allowed 38 runs (34 earned) on 72 hits and 39 walks while striking out 25 in 59 2/3 innings of work.

Roy later returned to the Brewers (1951) and also played for AA Atlanta Crackers (1952). After that he developed severe pitching arm problems and was unable to continue his career. He went 27–15 with a 3.52 ERA in 70 minor league games.

Following his retirement, Roy was employed with Raytheon Company for more than 38 years at both the Bedford and Tewksbury locations.

Normie Roy died in Nashua, New Hampshire, at the age of 82, following a brief illness.

== See also ==
- 1950 Boston Braves season
