= Newport Colts =

- 1897–1908; (1897–1899, 1908); Newport, Rhode Island

Minor league affiliations
- Class: Class B (1897–1899); Class D (1908)
- League: New England League (1896–1899); Atlantic Association (1908)

Major league affiliations
- Team: None

Minor league titles
- League titles (1): 1897
- Conference titles (1): 1899

Team data
- Name: Newport Colts (1896–1899); Newport Ponies (1908)
- Ballpark: Basin Field (Cardines Field) (1897–1899, 1908)

The Newport Colts were a minor league baseball team based in Newport, Rhode Island from 1897 to 1899. The Newport Colts teams played as members of the New England League, winning the league championship in 1897 and a spilt-season pennant in 1899. The Newport Ponies succeeded the Colts in minor league play, becoming members of the short-lived 1908 Atlantic Association.

Newport teams played home minor league games at Cardines Field, then called Basin Field, built in 1893 and still in use today.

== History ==
In 1897, the Newport Colts began minor league play, when the team became members of the six-team Class B level New England League. The Brockton Shoemakers, Fall River Indians, New Bedford Whalers, Pawtucket Phenoms and Taunton Herrings joined Newport in 1897 New England League play.

After beginning play on May 1, 1897, the Newport Colts won the New England League championship in their first season of play. The Colts had a record of 70–37 record, playing under manager Mickey Finn and finished in a tie, as the Brockton Shoemakers finished with the same record. They were followed by the Pawtucket Phenoms (54–51), Fall River Indians (47–59), Taunton Herrings (40–68) and New Bedford Whalers (38–67) in the New England League final standings. Pitcher Marvin Hawley of Newport led the league with 24 wins.

Continuing play in the 1898 six-team Class B level New England League, the Newport Colts placed fourth in the final standings, as the league folded during the season. The league stopped play on July 5, 1898. The Colts ended the season with a record of 26–28, playing under returning manager Mickey Finn and Mike Kelley. Newport finished 9.0 games behind the first place Brockton Shoemakers in the final standings. Player/manager Mike Kelley led the league with 56 runs scored and teammate John Gilbert stole 36 bases to lead the league.

The 1899 New England League expanded to eight teams, but four folded during the season. With a 52–46 final record, the Newport Colts placed third among the four remaining teams in the overall standings. Playing again under manager Mickey Finn, the Colts finished 8.0 games behind the first place Portland Phenoms. The New England League did not return to play in the 1900 season. John Gilbert again led the league with 53 stolen bases and Newport pitcher Gussie Gannon led the league with a .739 win percentage, compiling a record of 17–6.

It was reported that the Newport Colts won the second half of the 1899 New England League season under dubious circumstances. Allegedly, the Portland Phenoms and Manchester, not wanting Newport to win the second half of the season, expanded the schedule on the final day from a doubleheader to play six games in one day, beginning at 9:00 AM. Manchester won all six games, to move ahead of Newport in the standings, but the league allowed only two of the wins. In was noted that Portland subsequently refused to play Newport in the finals.

Newport was without a minor league team until 1908, when the city hosted their final minor league team to date. The Newport Ponies played briefly as members of the Atlantic Association, which folded during the season. After beginning league play on May 2, 1908, the Ponies had a record of 5–5 record under managers Ben Anthony and George Reed. The Atlantic Association disbanded on May 21, 1908, with Newport in fourth place, 2.5 games behind the 1st place Portland Blue Sox.

Newport, Rhode Island has not hosted another minor league team.

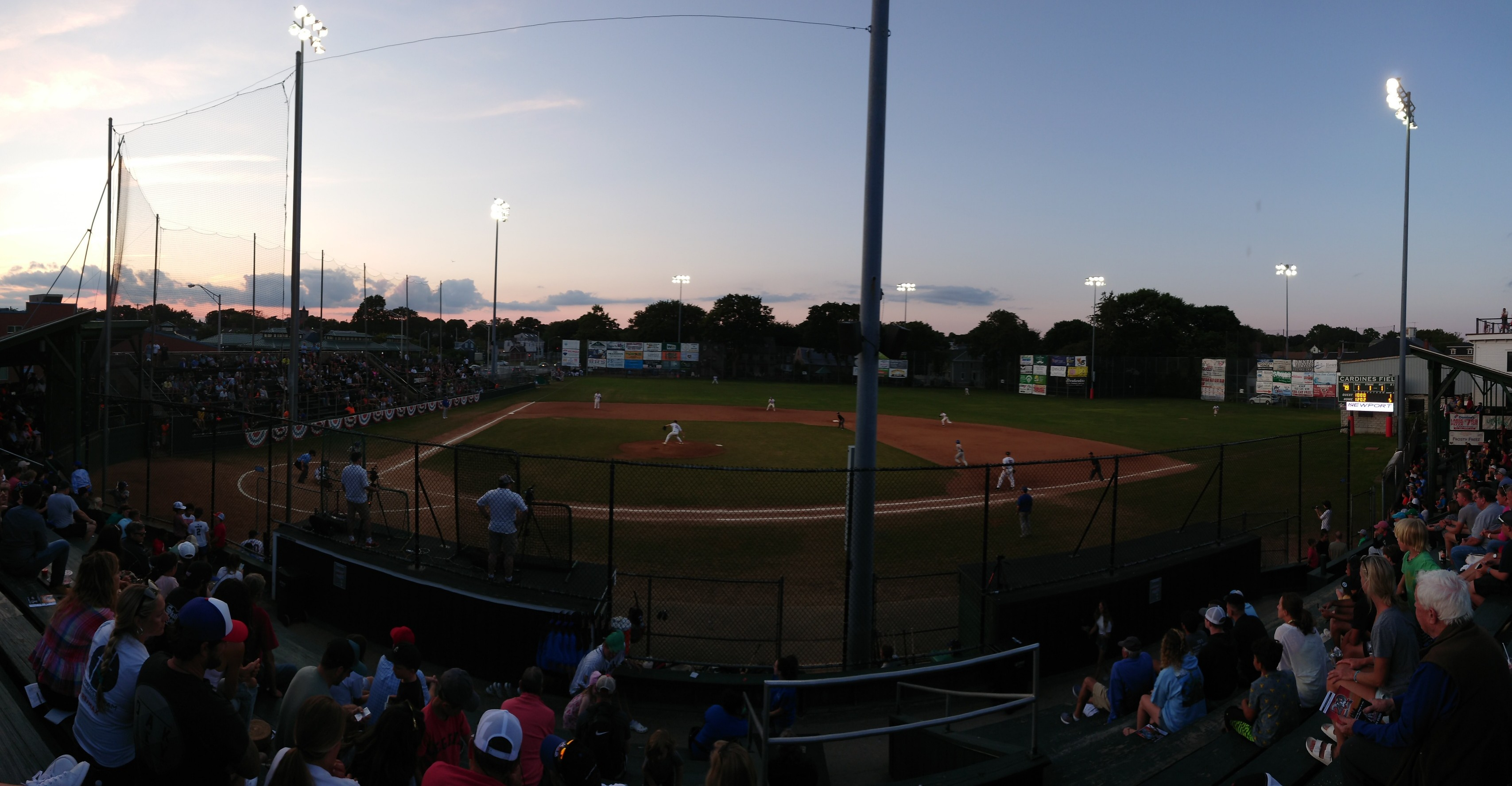
(2021) Cardines Field. Newport, Rhode Island

== The ballpark ==
Newport minor league teams reportedly hosted home games at Cardines Field. The ballpark was originally called "Basin Field" and built in 1893 on railroad land, with the backstop added in 1908. The ballpark is still in use today. The Newport Gulls of the New England Collegiate Baseball League continue play at Cardines Field. The location is America's Cup Avenue and West Marlborough Street, Newport, Rhode Island.

== Timeline ==
| Year(s) | # Yrs. | Team | Level | League | Ballpark |
|---|---|---|---|---|---|
| 1897–1899 | 3 | Newport Colts | Class B | New England League | Basin Field (Cardines Field) |
| 1908 | 1 | Newport Ponies | Class D | Atlantic Association | Basin Field (Cardines Field) |

== Year-by-year records ==
| Year | Record | Finish | Manager | Playoffs/notes |
|---|---|---|---|---|
| 1897 | 70–37 | 1st | Mickey Finn | League champions |
| 1898 | 26–28 | 4th | Mickey Finn / Mike Kelley | No playoffs held |
| 1899 | 52–46 | 3rd | Mickey Finn | No playoffs held |
| 1908 | 5–5 | 4th | Ben Anthony / George Reed | League disbanded May 21 |

== Notable alumni ==
- Joe Bean (1897–1898)
- Kitty Bransfield (1898)
- Frank Corridon (1899)
- Pat Crisham (1897)
- Joe Delahanty (1897)
- Ben Ellis (1897)
- Tom Fleming (1899)
- William Gallagher (1898)
- Gussie Gannon (1898–1899)
- Jack Gilbert (1897–1899)
- Marvin Hawley (1897)
- Mike Hickey (1898)
- Mike Kelley (1897), (1898, MGR)
- Jim McCormick (1898–1899)
- Frank Morrissey (1899)
- Dave Pickett (1897–1898)
- Danny Shay (1899)
- Tom Smith (1899)
- Dummy Stephenson (1897)

=== See also ===
Newport Colts players
