= Jim Connor =

American baseball player (1863–1950)

- Second baseman
- Born: May 11, 1863; Port Jervis, New York, U.S.
- Died: September 3, 1950 (aged 87); Providence, Rhode Island, U.S.
- Batted: Right Threw: Right

MLB debut
- July 11, 1892, for the Chicago Colts

Last MLB appearance
- September 9, 1899, for the Chicago Orphans

MLB statistics
- Batting average: .233
- Home runs: 3
- Runs batted in: 129
- Stats at Baseball Reference

Teams
- Chicago Colts/Orphans (1892, 1897–1899)

James Matthew Connor (May 11, 1863 – September 3, 1950) was an American professional Major League Baseball player. Connor was 29 years old when he broke into the big leagues on July 11, 1892, with the Chicago Colts. He did not play in the majors again until 1897. Connor's last game was August 9, 1899, with the Chicago Orphans. He played in the minors from 1887 through 1908, including a stint as player/manager in the Hudson River League in 1907. James Connor died on August 3, 1950, in Providence, Rhode Island. Connor is buried at Mount Saint Mary Cemetery, Pawtucket, Rhode Island.

In 293 games over four seasons, Connor posted a .233 batting average (247-for-1058) with 117 runs, 3 home runs and 129 RBI.
