= Newark Little Giants =

Baseball team (1884-1890)

Information
- League: Atlantic Association (1889-1890); Central League (1888); International Association (1887); Eastern League (1884-1886)
- Location: Newark, New Jersey
- Founded: 1884
- Folded: 1890
- League championships: 1886, 1888
- Former name: Newark Trunkmakers (1888); Newark Domestics (1884-1885)
- Manager: Charlie Hackett (1887)

The Newark Little Giants were a professional baseball team based in Newark, New Jersey in the late 1880s. They won two league championships in the minor leagues.

== History ==
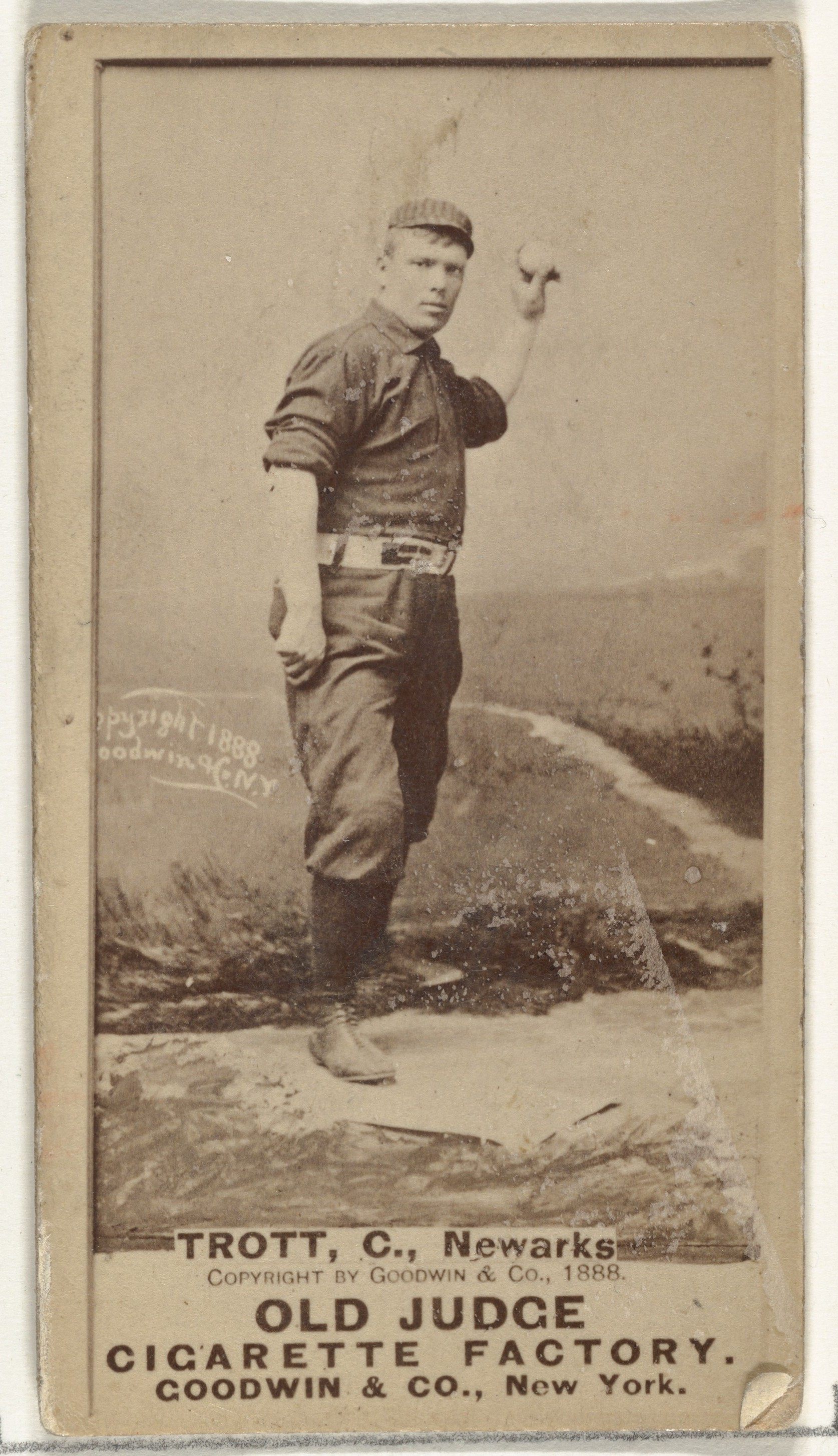
A baseball card showing Sam Trott, a catcher for the Little Giants

The Little Giants started out in the Eastern League, where they played from 1884 to 1886. They were known as the Newark Domestics in 1884 and 1885. They won the 1886 Eastern League pennant. For the 1887 season, they moved to the International Association.

They played the 1888 season as the Newark Trunkmakers, winning the Central League in that league's single season of existence. They returned to the Little Giants name for two final seasons in 1889 and 1890, as part of the Atlantic Association.

== 1887: The first African-American battery ==
Newark featured the first all African-American battery (pitcher and catcher pairing) for a mixed-race team in organized baseball, in 1887. George Stovey was one of the team's best pitchers, with a 2.46 ERA with a win-loss record of approximately 33-14, and a .255 batting average. He pitched to catcher Moses Fleetwood Walker, who had been the first African-American to play in the major leagues a few years before. The team was noted for their diversity at the time, fielding African-American, Irish, and German battery pairs.

In 1887, the Little Giants had an exhibition game scheduled against the major league Chicago White Stockings that contributed to the formalization of the baseball color line. Chicago's team captain, Cap Anson, sent a telegram to the Little Giants threatening that the White Stockings would not play if Stovey or Walker played. Neither played, and the game went on as scheduled, with Newark defeating Chicago 9-4. The next day, the International Association passed a resolution that the league would not approve any further contracts to Black players. This racial segregation would last until Jackie Robinson played for the Montreal Royals of the International League (the current form of the International Association) in 1946.
