= Pawtucket Slaters (baseball) =

American minor-league baseball team

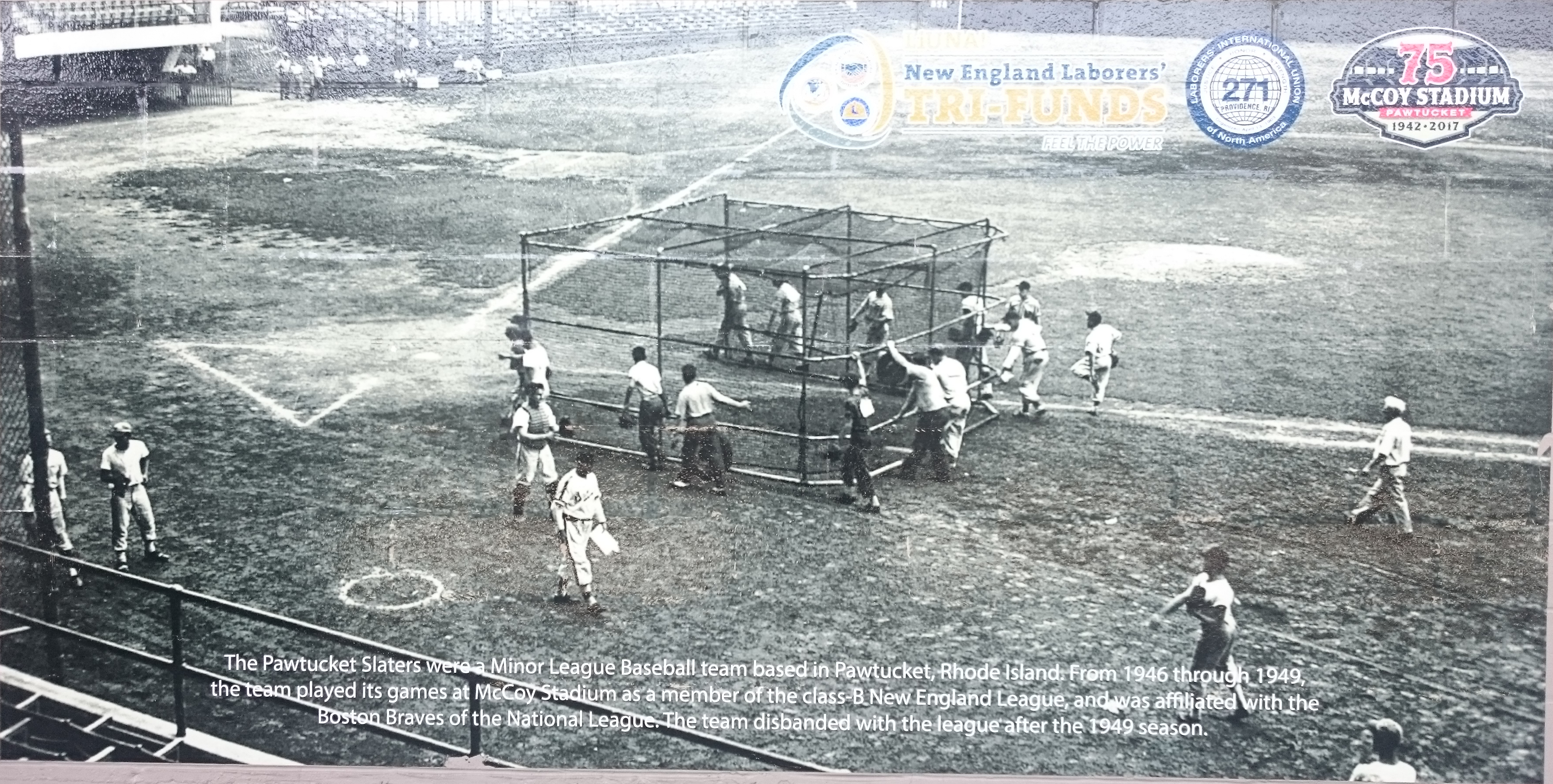
Mural on the concourse of McCoy Stadium

The Pawtucket Slaters were a minor-league baseball team based in Pawtucket, Rhode Island. From 1946 through 1949, the team played its games at McCoy Stadium as a member of the class-B New England League, and was affiliated with the Boston Braves of the National League. The Slaters made the league playoffs in each season of their four-year existence; in each case, they were eliminated in the first round, including three consecutive playoff losses at the hands of the eventual league champion Nashua Dodgers.

The Slaters were preceded in the New England League by the Pawtucket Maroons (1894–1896), Pawtucket Phenoms (1897) and Pawtucket Tigers (1898) and Pawtucket Colts.

Pawtucket led the New England League in attendance in 1947. The team disbanded with the league after the 1949 season.

== Season-by-season record ==
Year	Record	Finish Full Season	Attendance	Manager	Postseason
1946	70–54	Fourth	n/a	Hughie Wise	Lost to Nashua Dodgers in first round
1947	65–60	Fourth	92,787	Pete Fox	Lost to Nashua in first round
1948	61–64	Fourth	60,432	Hughie Wise	Lost to Nashua in first round
1949	83–43	First	68,767	Ripper Collins; Dutch Dorman; Earl Browne	Lost to Springfield Cubs in first round

== Notable alumni ==
- Dave Cole
- George Crowe
- Ernie Johnson
- Don Liddle
- Johnny Logan
- Normie Roy
- Chuck Tanner
- Pete Whisenant
