= Les German =

American baseball player (1869–1934)

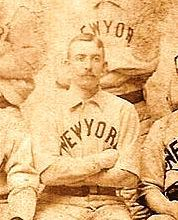
- Pitcher
- Born: June 1, 1869; Baltimore, Maryland, U.S.
- Died: June 10, 1934 (aged 65); Germantown, Maryland, U.S.
- Batted: Right Threw: Right

MLB debut
- August 27, 1890, for the Baltimore Orioles

Last MLB appearance
- August 6, 1897, for the Washington Senators

MLB statistics
- Win–loss record: 34–63
- Strikeouts: 147
- Earned run average: 5.49
- Stats at Baseball Reference

Teams
- Baltimore Orioles (1890); New York Giants (1893–1896); Washington Senators (1896–1897)

Lester Stanley German (June 1, 1869 – June 10, 1934) was an American Major League Baseball pitcher. He played in all or part of six seasons in the majors between 1890 and 1897. He played for the Baltimore Orioles in 1890, then spent four seasons pitching for the New York Giants (1893 to 1896), finishing his career with the Washington Senators. His lifetime pitching record was 34 wins and 63 losses.

== Baseball career ==
German pitched in a total of 129 major league games. Winning 34 and losing 63, he was the starting pitcher in 92 games and a reliever in 37. His earned-run-average for six years was 5.49. His best season was 1894 when he won nine games and lost eight for the Giants. His worst season was in 1896 when he won only two and lost 20. He was not exclusively a pitcher, for he appeared in 14 games as a third baseman, two as an outfielder, and two as a second baseman. His lifetime batting average was .206, with 408 at bats, 106 hits, including eight doubles, three triples, and three home runs, and 48 runs-batted-in. In all, he played in 147 ball games at the major league level.

In the 1893 season, German was the most successful pitcher against his old club, the Baltimore's, in the east, and against the St. Louis Browns in the west. Three of the eastern teams and two of the western did not win a game against him. In fact, German and Wilson were the best working team of the New York Batteries in 1893 according to the 1894 edition of Spalding's Official Guide to Baseball.

== Personal life ==
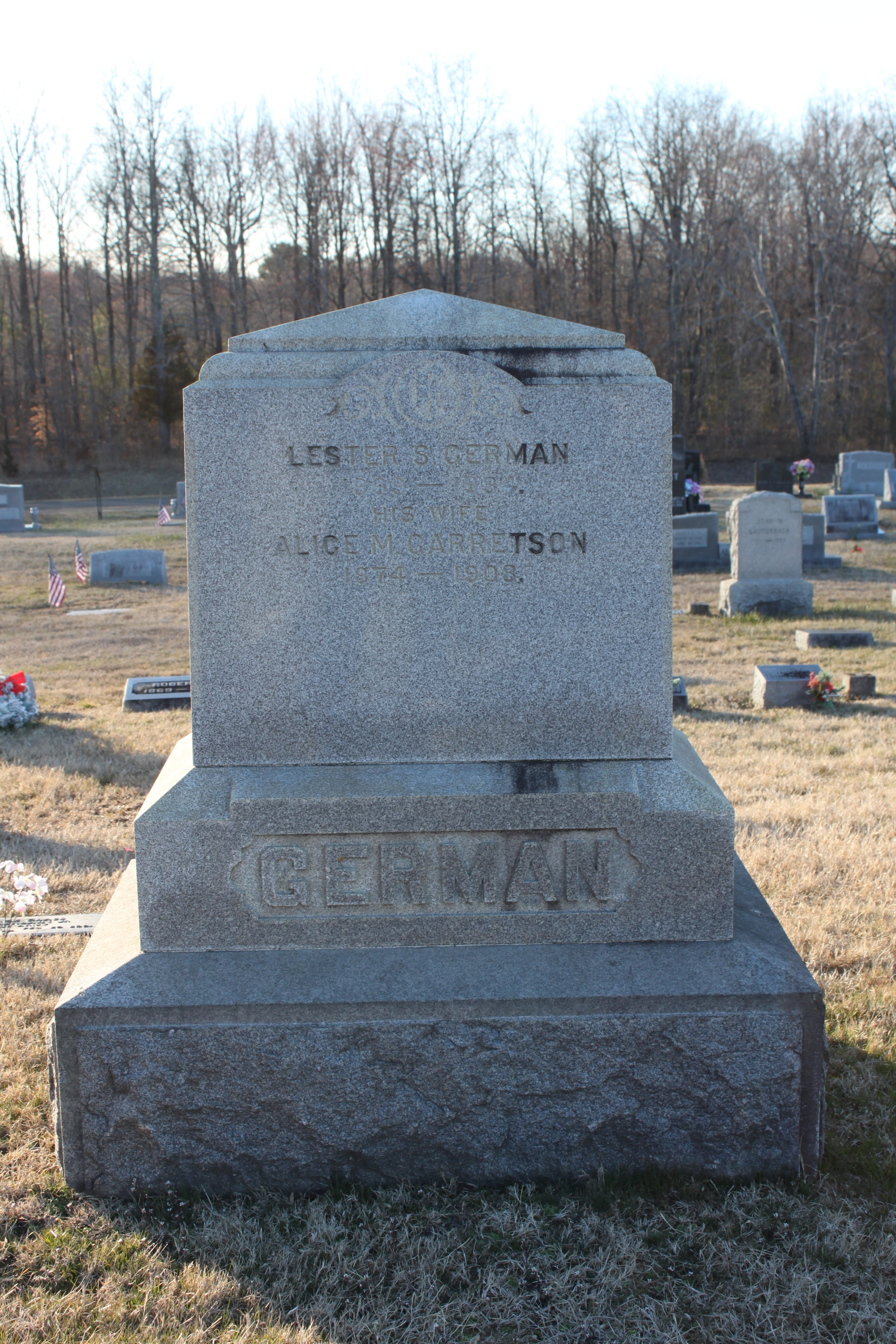
Grave of German at Baker Cemetery

Lester Stanley German, son of David and Mary Forthyse German, was born June 2, 1869. The Garretson Family Bible shows that Lester Stanley German and Alice Mary Garretson of Aberdeen were married in August 1895. They built a large Victorian home at 17 North Philadelphia Blvd. (now Route 40, then known as Broadway). It is just across the street from the Ripken Museum. The house has been converted to modern use, by adding a store front. Les and Alice lived here happily, according to family, when Les was not traveling with a team – either New York or Washington of the National League. Alice went with Les on the road trips until she became a mother.

After the two boys were born, Alice remained at home while Les made the rounds with his team. The little fellows died very early in their lives and are buried at Baker's Cemetery, at the top of the hill, where Alice and Les are both at rest. Alice died at the age of 34 in 1908 and several years later Les married again to another member of an old Aberdeen family, Grace Evans. They had a daughter, Ruth, and a son, Crosby. Much of their time was spent in Florida, but they kept the home on Broadway in Aberdeen. Lester German died in 1934.

Lester's major league career came to an end following the 1897 season. He was, insofar as can be determined, traded to a team in San Francisco where the cold wind and dampness of the Bay Area gave him a sore arm. He then began a new career as a trap-shooter. A born athlete, he was hired by the Dupont Powder Company to do trap shooting in exhibition matches. He often performed with the famous Annie Oakley.

The Aberdeen census of 1900 lists Lester German as a clerk. He sold guns and ammunition locally. He was quite a celebrity, both as a ball player and a trap-shooter, and local sportsmen depended upon him to choose their firearms. He was known for his big appetite, and he carried food with him at all times.

Les German had a remarkable career as a professional shooter for the Parker Gun Co. of Meriden, Connecticut; old Les won far more trapshooting tournaments than baseball games. In 1915 he established a new trapshooting world record by breaking 499 of 500 singles targets at the Westy Hogans shoot in Atlantic City, New Jersey. At this tournament he broke 647 of 650 singles, doubles and handicap targets.

== Sources ==
- Career statistics from Baseball Reference · Retrosheet · Baseball Almanac
- Baseball-almanac.com entry
