= Paddy Greene =

American baseball player (1875–1934)

- Third baseman
- Born: March 20, 1875; Providence, Rhode Island, U.S.
- Died: October 20, 1934 (aged 59); Providence, Rhode Island, U.S.
- Batted: Right Threw: Right

MLB debut
- September 10, 1902, for the Philadelphia Phillies

Last MLB appearance
- July 17, 1903, for the Detroit Tigers

MLB statistics
- Batting average: .185
- Home runs: 0
- Runs batted in: 1
- Stats at Baseball Reference

Teams
- Philadelphia Phillies (1902); New York Highlanders (1903); Detroit Tigers (1903)

Patrick Joseph Greene (March 20, 1875 – October 20, 1934) was an American professional baseball player. He played parts of two seasons in Major League Baseball for the Philadelphia Phillies, New York Highlanders and Detroit Tigers in 1902 and 1903. He batted and threw right-handed.

He was born and died in Providence, Rhode Island.
