= Jack Horner (baseball) =

American baseball player (1863–1910)

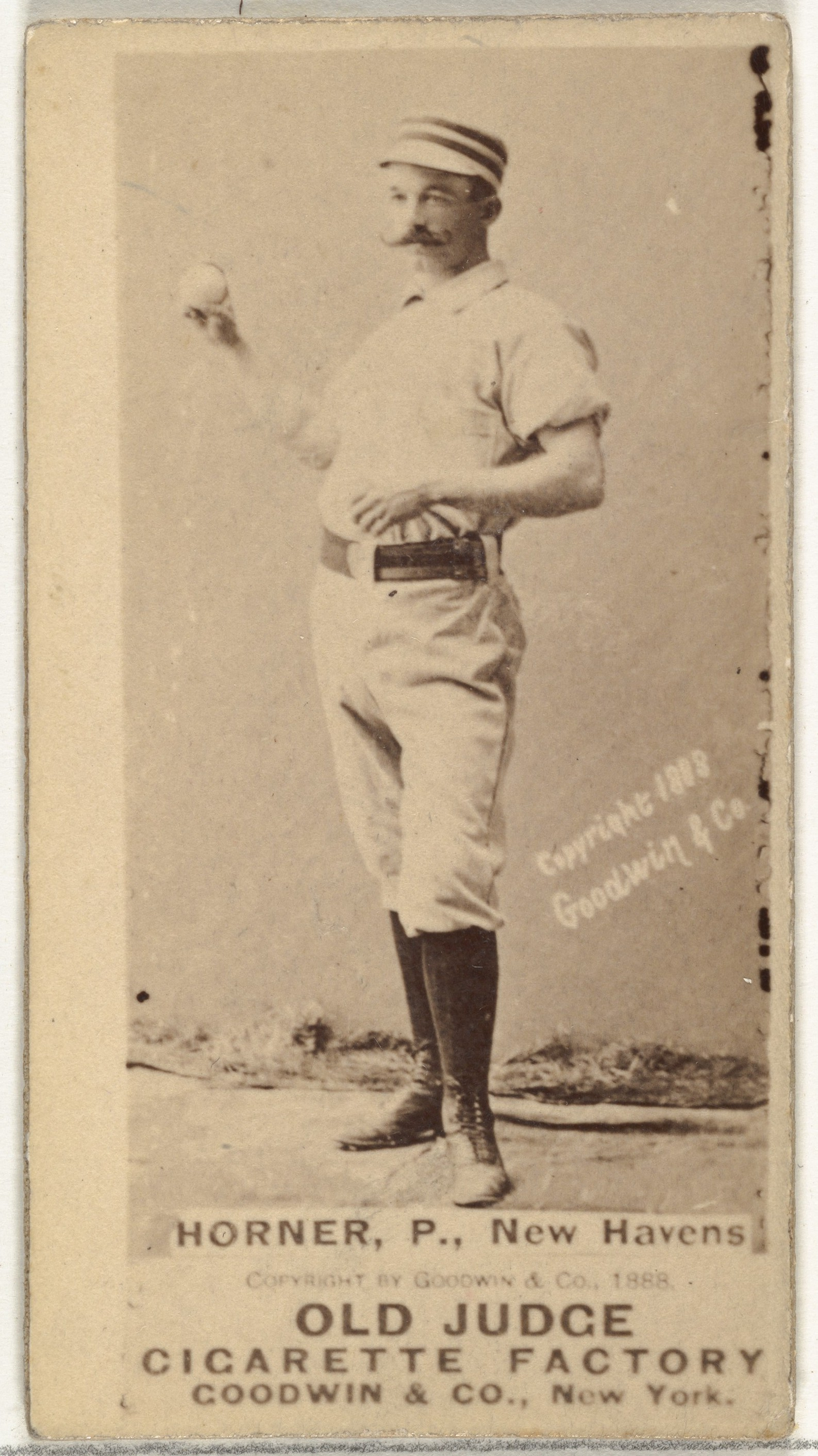
- Pitcher
- Born: September 21, 1863; Baltimore, Maryland, U.S.
- Died: July 14, 1910 (aged 46); New Orleans, Louisiana, U.S.
- Batted: Right Threw: Unknown

MLB debut
- May 7, 1894, for the Baltimore Orioles

Last MLB appearance
- May 11, 1894, for the Baltimore Orioles

MLB statistics
- Win–loss record: 0–1
- Earned run average: 9.00
- Strikeouts: 2
- Stats at Baseball Reference

Teams
- Baltimore Orioles (1894)

William "Jack" Frank Horner (September 21, 1863 – July 14, 1910) was an American professional baseball player who played in two games for the Baltimore Orioles during the 1894 season. He was born in Baltimore, Maryland and died in New Orleans, Louisiana at the age of 46.
