= Mike O'Rourke (baseball) =

American baseball player (1868–1934)

- Pitcher/Outfielder
- Born: September 1, 1868
- Died: March 3, 1934 (aged 65); Richmond, Virginia
- Batted: Unknown Threw: Unknown

MLB debut
- September 1, 1890, for the Baltimore Orioles

Last MLB appearance
- October 15, 1890, for the Baltimore Orioles

MLB statistics
- Win–loss record: 1–2
- Strikeouts: 8
- Earned run average: 3.95
- Stats at Baseball Reference

Teams
- Baltimore Orioles (1890)

Michael Joseph O'Rourke (September 1, 1868 – March 3, 1934) was a Major League Baseball pitcher. He pitched for the Baltimore Orioles of the American Association in eight games during the 1890 baseball season.
