= Skinny Graham (outfielder) =

American baseball player (1909–1967)

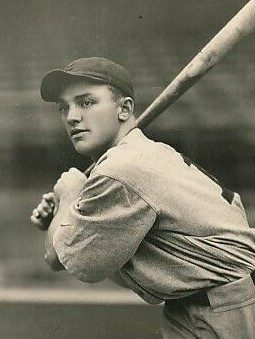
- Outfielder
- Born: August 12, 1909; Somerville, Massachusetts, U.S.
- Died: July 10, 1967 (aged 57); Cambridge, Massachusetts, U.S.
- Batted: Left Threw: Right

MLB debut
- September 14, 1934, for the Boston Red Sox

Last MLB appearance
- September 29, 1935, for the Boston Red Sox

MLB statistics
- Batting average: .246
- Home runs: 0
- Runs batted in: 4
- Stats at Baseball Reference

Teams
- Boston Red Sox (1934–1935)

Arthur William "Skinny" Graham Jr. (August 12, 1909 – July 10, 1967) was an American professional baseball player whose nine-season career included 21 games played as an outfielder and pinch hitter for the 1934–1935 Boston Red Sox. Born in Somerville, Massachusetts, he was listed as 5 feet 7 inches (1.70 m) tall and 162 pounds (73 kg). He batted left-handed and threw right-handed.

Graham graduated from Bridgton Academy in Maine. Baseball Reference lists his pro career as beginning at age 24 in 1934 in the Red Sox' farm system with Reading of the New York–Pennsylvania League; a Society for American Baseball Research biography, however, dates his pro career to earlier in the 1930s in lower-level minor leagues. After hitting .331 in 1934 with 51 extra-base hits at Reading, he was promoted to Boston, batting .234 with 11 hits in 13 September games. He spent most of 1935 in the minors, returning to the Red Sox late in the season and hitting .300 (three for ten) in limited service.

All told, in 21 MLB games, he collected 14 hits, with two doubles, one triple, four runs batted in and three stolen bases. In 1936, Graham returned to the minor leagues for the rest of his pro career.

He died in Cambridge, Massachusetts, at 57 in July 1967. One of his sons, Arthur III, played professional football for the Boston Patriots of the AFL from 1963 through 1968.
