= John Leighton (baseball) =

American baseball player (1861–1956)

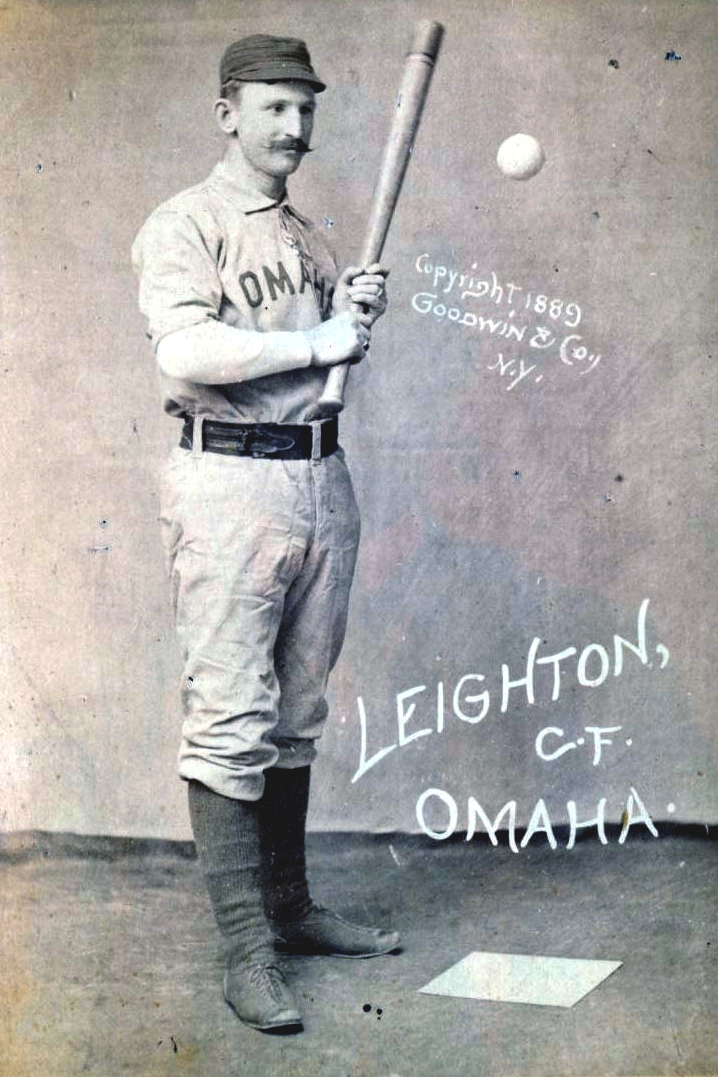
- Outfielder
- Born: October 4, 1861; Peabody, Massachusetts, U.S.
- Died: October 31, 1956 (aged 95); Lynn, Massachusetts, U.S.
- Batted: Left Threw: Left

MLB debut
- July 12, 1890, for the Syracuse Stars

Last MLB appearance
- July 20, 1890, for the Syracuse Stars

MLB statistics
- Batting average: .296
- Home runs: 0
- Runs batted in: 0
- Stats at Baseball Reference

Teams
- Syracuse Stars (1890)

John Atkinson Leighton (October 4, 1861 – October 31, 1956) was an American professional baseball outfielder with the Syracuse Stars of the American Association. He appeared in seven games for the Stars during the 1890 season. His minor league career stretched from 1887 through 1901 and included a couple of years as a minor league manager, in 1894 and 1908.

Records
Preceded by Henry Jones	Oldest recognized verified living baseball player May 31, 1955 – October 31, 1956	Succeeded by Dummy Hoy
