= Buster Burrell =

American baseball player (1866–1962)

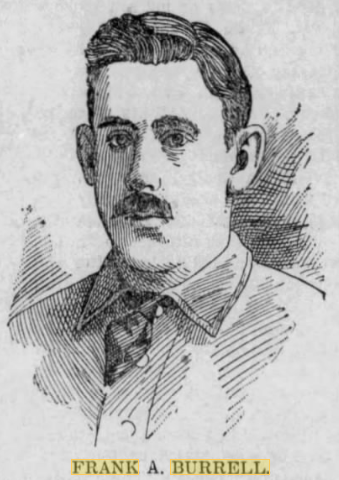
- Catcher
- Born: December 22, 1866; Weymouth, Massachusetts, U.S.
- Died: May 8, 1962 (aged 95); Weymouth, Massachusetts, U.S.
- Batted: Right Threw: Right

MLB debut
- August 1, 1891, for the New York Giants

Last MLB appearance
- October 2, 1897, for the Brooklyn Bridegrooms

MLB statistics
- Batting average: .246
- Home runs: 3
- Runs batted in: 47
- Stats at Baseball Reference

Teams
- New York Giants (1891); Brooklyn Grooms/Bridegrooms (1895–1897)

Frank Andrew Burrell (December 22, 1866 – May 8, 1962), was an American professional baseball player who played catcher from 1891 to 1897 for the New York Giants and Brooklyn Grooms/Bridegrooms. At the time of his death, he was the oldest living former major league player.

== Early life ==
Frank Andrew Burrell was born on December 22, 1866, in Weymouth, Massachusetts. The first child of Andrew Burrell, a shoe maker and mechanic, and his second wife Eliza Hayden. Frank grew up with an older sister Alice, from Andrew's first marriage, and two younger brothers, Albert and Fred. Somewhere along the way Frank acquired the nickname “Buster” and it stuck with him throughout his life. Growing up in the suburbs of baseball mad Boston, it was easy for the athletic Burrell to gravitate towards the game. By the time he was twenty one he was playing semi-professionally for teams in East Weymouth, Holbrook-Randolph, and Medford. By 1889, the catcher and first baseman had shown enough progress to be picked up by the Lovells, a talented club formed by the Lovell Arms Company of Boston. Buster played another year of semi-professional ball with the Atlantics in 1890.

== Career ==
Buster began his professional career in 1891 with Salem (MA) of the New England League. Midway through the season, on July 18, due to bad management and poor attendance, the team disbanded. What appeared to be a setback was merely a bump in the road for Burrell. The New York Giants of the National League, were in need of a replacement catcher for the oft-injured starter Dick Buckley. On July 29, the Giants signed the Salem cast-off to play for the legendary Jim Mutrie.

Frank “Buster” Burrell played his first game for the Giants on August 1, 1891, against Tom Lovett and the Brooklyn Grooms. Catching starter, John Ewing, brother of Giants star Buck Ewing, Buster committed two passed balls and had two throwing errors in a 9–6 loss. He did however get his first big league base hit and scored a run off Lovett in the seventh inning. In his next start on August 7, against the Pittsburgh Pirates, he again caught Ewing. He had a better day catching, but in the second inning he was tagged out by Pirates catcher, Connie Mack, on an unassisted double-play. He also struck out with the bases loaded in the sixth inning. The Giants lost 2-0.

Not scheduled to catch on August 13, a strange turn of events placed Burrell behind the bat with future Hall of Famer Mickey Welch in the box. It was Pitcher Bob Barr's first game for the Giants. In the 3rd inning after giving up a home run to Cincinnati Reds Arlie Latham, a foul ball was hit into the grandstand by the Reds Jocko Halligan. The ball was retrieved by a New York City policeman and heaved back onto the field striking Barr in the head and rendering him unconscious. Unable to continue, he was removed from the field and Welch came in to pitch. In the 5th inning, Dick Buckley injured his finger, resulting in Buster being subbed in to catch “Smiling Mickey”. He finished out the contest without incident.

Burrell played only sparingly over the next month. On September 21 another case of serendipity would put him in to catch the great Amos Rusie for the only time in his career. In a game against Philadelphia, injuries to several regulars forced the Giants to play Buster in center field. Starter Ewing injured his ankle running the bases in the second forcing manager Mutrie to bring in Rusie. After attempting to handle the “Hoosier Thunderbolt” for 2 innings and giving up 4 passed balls, second string catcher Artie Clarke traded positions with the intrepid Burrell. He too had a tough time handling Rusie's fastballs. He finished out the game giving up 3 more passed balls and the Giants lost 11-9.

With New York out of the pennant race, Buster started at catcher in 6 of his team's last 8 games. He ended the season batting .094, with 5 hits in 53 at bats. He committed 14 errors and had 16 passed balls. Burrell would not be re-signed by the Giants for the 1892 season. Having shown that he wasn't ready for “fast company”, Burrell returned home to play for the Woonsocket (RI) team of the New England League. As their starting catcher he helped lead them to the pennant in 1892. The following season while playing for Fall River, he batted .308 and was instrumental in securing the NENL championship for the Massachusetts club.

After his hometown team the Boston Beaneaters showed some interest in acquiring Burrell for the 1894 season, he took his talents to the Midwest and signed with the Minneapolis Minnies of the Western League. It was here that his ability as a hitter and durability as a catcher came to the forefront. Catching the whole season, Buster played in 130 games. He batted .384 with a .631 slugging percentage and 32 home runs with 7 multiple home run games. On May 13, he went deep 3 times off of the future hall of famer, Kansas City Cowboys pitcher, Joe McGinnity. By the end of the year, Charlie Bryne, president of the Brooklyn Grooms signed Buster Burrell to play for the 1895 season.

As the third catcher behind John Grim and Con Daily, Burrell saw limited action early in the season. On June 14 he hit his first MLB home run off St. Louis Brown's pitcher Harry Staley in a 12-7 Brooklyn victory. That would be his last game for nearly two months. He contracted Erysipelas, a bacterial infection, through a cut in his leg. He came back off the sick list to play on August 21 against the Browns. He finished the season playing in 12 games, batting .143 with one home run.

Frank Burrell's 1896 season with Brooklyn would prove to be his best. The steady back-up to starter Grim, he would catch 60 games that year. During the months of May and June, given the chance to finally play regularly, Burrell put up impressive numbers. In May, he batted .422, had 19 hits batted safely in 11 of the 14 games he played and had an OPS+ of 165. One of his 3 hits on May 9 versus Cleveland came against the legendary Cy Young. Buster took his hot hitting into June. He added another 14 hits in 11 games and finished the month with a .368 average. Burrell ended the year batting .301 with 62 hits in 62 games played. With his improved defense and his ability to hit National League pitches, Burrell's baseball future looked bright.

After his successful 1896 season, Burrell secured a contract with the Bridegrooms for the 1897 season. But in the winter of that year, while at his home in Weymouth disaster struck. Frank Burrell contracted typhoid fever. He was seriously ill for months and missed all of spring training. He joined the team in late April. On April 28 he was in uniform in Baltimore. In the fifth inning catcher Grim, after trying to hold off the Orioles stolen base attack, hurt his arm. A recovering Burrell came in to relieve the injured backstop. The fleet footed Orioles showed no mercy and continued to run wild on the base paths. Led by Willie Keeler they stole 15 bases that day. Buster wasn't ready to play, and went back on the disabled list. He would miss the entire month of May.

Burrell returned to the line-up in June but he wasn't right. After playing two games he was back on the disabled list. By August, Buster had worked himself into shape. With injuries to Grim and back-up Aleck Smith, Frank started to appear in the line-up as catcher and first base. The hitting reappeared at times as well. He hit his first home run in over 2 years against Baltimore's Arlie Pond on August 16. Against Pittsburgh on August 25 he had the best RBI game of his career, driving in 5 runs in Brooklyn's 14-6 pasting of the Pirates. In September facing Kid Nichols in Boston he hit a 2 run shot into the left field bleachers. Buster finished out the season catching Brooklyn's last game against the Beaneaters, he went 2 for 5 with an RBI. He finished the year batting .243 in 33 games played. Frank Burrell was not offered a contract with Brooklyn for the 1898 campaign. His Major League career had ended but his baseball career had not.

The next year found him in Syracuse of the Eastern League hoping to get back to the majors. After he was released by Stars prior to the 1899 season, Burrell went back to New England and hooked up with the Taunton (MA) Herrings of the NENL. It was here and another incident of happenstance, that Buster brushed up once again with a future New York Giant Hall of Famer.

In the summer of 1899, Christy Matthewson made his professional debut pitching for Taunton. Frank Burrell was playing first base on July 21 against Manchester when Matthewson started his first game. In Matty's next start on July 24 against Brockton, Burrell was again at first base when catcher John Curtis got injured in the fourth inning. Buster took over for Curtis and for the only time that season he caught the teenage pitching phenom.

Hoping to recapture some of the magic from his 1894 season in Minneapolis, Burrell went back to Minnesota in 1900. Things had changed in 7 years. The Western League had now transformed into the American League. Though still considered a minor league, it was gearing itself up for major league status. Buster went to spring training with the Minnies but failed to make the team and was released before the start of the regular season. He signed on in June to play with Binghamton of the New York State League and finished out the year.

By 1901 at age 34, Frank Burrell's baseball journey took him back home to New England. It was where it began and where it would end. For the next 7 summers he would play baseball in the NENL. He put on uniforms in Lewiston, Dover, Brockton, New Bedford and Lowell. Buster finished his career at age 40 playing first with an occasional stint at catcher for the Lowell Tigers.

== Later life ==
When his career ended Buster continued to live at his home in East Weymouth. He resided there with his wife, the former Mary Borden, whom he had married in 1896 for the rest of his life. They had no children. He worked various jobs in sales and as a chauffeur at a shoe factory. Upon the death of Dummy Hoy on December 15, 1961, Burrell, age 94 was the oldest living former major leaguer. In January of 1962, Frank left his home at 108 High Street and went into a nursing home in South Weymouth. He died there on May 8, 1962, at age 95. He died from age

Records
Preceded by Dummy Hoy	Oldest recognized verified living baseball player December 15, 1961 – May 8, 1962	Succeeded by William Kinsler
