= Worcester Panthers =

Defunct American baseball team

The Worcester Panthers were an Eastern League baseball team based in Worcester, Massachusetts. They existed from 1923 to 1925.

== History ==
The Worcester Panthers were succeeded by the 1933 Worcester Chiefs of the New England League and the Worcester Rosebuds, won the pennant in the 1934 Northeastern League.

The Panthers were preceded by Worcester, Massachusetts State Association (1884); Worcester Grays, New England League (1888); Worcester, Atlantic Association (1889-1890); Worcester, New England League (1891, 1894, 1898); Worcester Farmers, Eastern League (1899-1900); Worcester Quakers, Eastern League (1901); Worcester Hustlers, Eastern League (1902); Worcester Riddlers, Eastern League (1903); Worcester Reds, Connecticut League (1904); Worcester Busters, New England League (1906-1915); Worcester Busters, Eastern League (1916-1917) and the Worcester Boosters, Eastern League (1918-1922).

== Baseball Hall of Fame alumni ==
The Panthers were managed by Hall of Fame baseball player Jesse Burkett in 1923 and 1924. He led them to a 79-74 record in 1923, and a 70-82 record in 1924. In 1925, they were managed by Eddie Eayrs and future Hall of Fame manager Casey Stengel.

== The ballpark ==
The Worcester Panthers played their home games at Boulevard Park.
