= 1908 Washington Senators season =

1908 Washington Senators
- League: American League
- Ballpark: National Park
- City: Washington, D.C.
- Record: 67–85 (.441)
- League place: 7th
- Owners: Thomas C. Noyes
- Managers: Joe Cantillon

The 1908 Washington Senators won 67 games, lost 85, and finished in seventh place in the American League. They were managed by Joe Cantillon and played home games at National Park.

== Offseason ==
- October 5, 1907: Charlie Jones was traded by the Senators to the St. Louis Browns for Ollie Pickering.

== Regular season ==
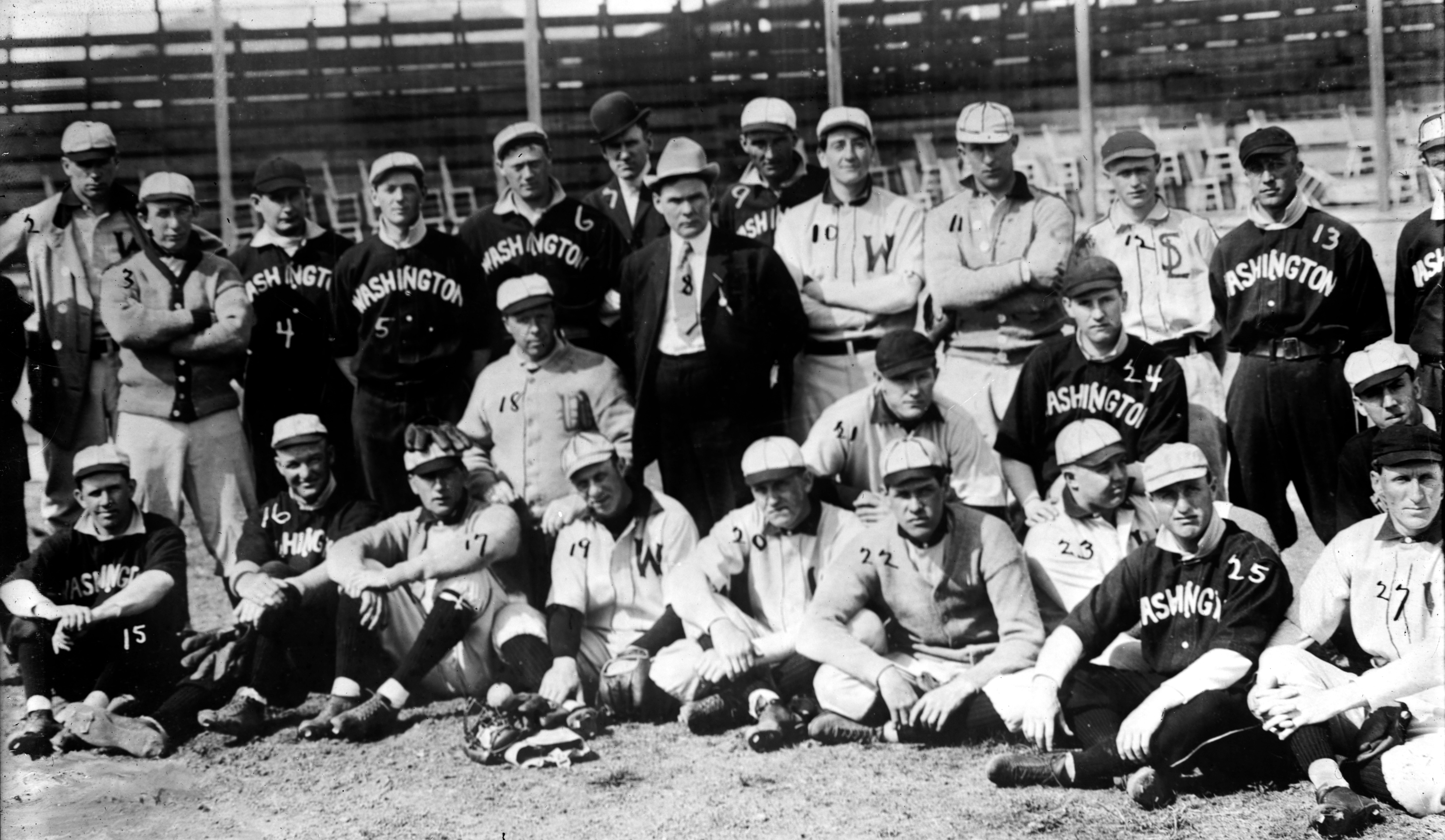
The 1908 Washington Senators team

=== Season standings ===
American League
Team	W	L	Pct.	GB	Home	Road
Detroit Tigers	90	63	.588	—	44‍–‍33	46‍–‍30
Cleveland Naps	90	64	.584	½	51‍–‍26	39‍–‍38
Chicago White Sox	88	64	.579	1½	51‍–‍25	37‍–‍39
St. Louis Browns	83	69	.546	6½	46‍–‍31	37‍–‍38
Boston Red Sox	75	79	.487	15½	37‍–‍40	38‍–‍39
Philadelphia Athletics	68	85	.444	22	46‍–‍30	22‍–‍55
Washington Senators	67	85	.441	22½	43‍–‍32	24‍–‍53
New York Highlanders	51	103	.331	39½	30‍–‍47	21‍–‍56

=== Record vs. opponents ===
1908 American League record Sources:
Team	BOS	CWS	CLE	DET	NYH	PHA	SLB	WSH
Boston	—	6–16–1	10–12	11–11	12–10	10–12	15–7	11–11
Chicago	16–6–1	—	8–14–1	9–13	16–6	13–9	11–10	15–6–2
Cleveland	12–10	14–8–1	—	13–9	16–6	16–6–1	11–11–1	8–14
Detroit	11–11	13–9	9–13	—	15–7	14–8–1	12–10	16–5
New York	10–12	6–16	6–16	7–15	—	8–14–1	5–17	9–13
Philadelphia	12–10	9–13	6–16–1	8–14–1	14–8–1	—	8–13–1	11–11
St. Louis	7–15	10–11	11–11–1	10–12	17–5	13–8–1	—	15–7–1
Washington	11–11	6–15–2	14–8	5–16	13–9	11–11	7–15–1	—

=== Notable transactions ===
- May 31, 1908: Casey Patten was traded by the Senators to the Boston Red Sox for Jesse Tannehill.

=== Roster ===
1908 Washington Senators
Roster
Pitchers: Bill Burns; Eli Cates; Cy Falkenberg; Hank Gehring; Tom Hughes; Walter Johnson; Burt Keeley; Casey Patten; Charlie Smith; Jesse Tannehill; Roy Witherup	Catchers: Mike Kahoe; Gabby Street; Jack Warner; Infielders: Dave Altizer; Jim Delahanty; Jerry Freeman; George McBride; Bill Shipke; Bob Unglaub	Outfielders: Otis Clymer; Bob Edmundson; Bob Ganley; Clyde Milan; Ollie Pickering	Manager: Joe Cantillon

== Player stats ==
=== Batting ===
==== Starters by position ====
Note: Pos = Position; G = Games played; AB = At bats; H = Hits; Avg. = Batting average; HR = Home runs; RBI = Runs batted in

Pos	Player	G	AB	H	Avg.	HR	RBI
C	Gabby Street	131	394	81	.206	1	32
1B	Jerry Freeman	154	531	134	.252	1	45
2B	Jim Delahanty	83	287	91	.317	1	30
SS	George McBride	155	518	120	.232	0	34
3B	Bill Shipke	111	341	71	.208	0	20
OF	Ollie Pickering	113	373	84	.225	2	30
OF	Bob Ganley	150	549	131	.239	1	36
OF	Clyde Milan	130	485	116	.239	1	32

==== Other batters ====
Note: G = Games played; AB = At bats; H = Hits; Avg. = Batting average; HR = Home runs; RBI = Runs batted in

Player	G	AB	H	Avg.	HR	RBI
Otis Clymer	110	368	93	.253	1	35
Bob Unglaub	72	276	85	.308	0	29
Dave Altizer	67	205	46	.224	0	18
Jack Warner	51	116	28	.239	1	32
Bob Edmundson	26	80	15	.188	0	2
Mike Kahoe	17	27	5	.185	0	0

=== Pitching ===
==== Starting pitchers ====
Note: G = Games pitched; IP = Innings pitched; W = Wins; L = Losses; ERA = Earned run average; SO = Strikeouts

Player	G	IP	W	L	ERA	SO
Tom Hughes	43	276.1	18	15	2.21	165
Walter Johnson	36	256.1	14	14	1.65	160
Charlie Smith	26	183.0	9	13	2.41	83
Bill Burns	23	164.0	6	11	1.70	55
Jesse Tannehill	10	71.2	2	4	3.77	14
Roy Witherup	6	48.1	2	4	2.98	31

==== Other pitchers ====
Note: G = Games pitched; IP = Innings pitched; W = Wins; L = Losses; ERA = Earned run average; SO = Strikeouts

Player	G	IP	W	L	ERA	SO
Burt Keeley	28	169.0	6	11	2.98	68
Eli Cates	19	113.2	4	8	2.53	33
Cy Falkenberg	17	82.2	6	2	1.96	34
Casey Patten	4	18.0	0	2	3.50	6
Hank Gehring	3	5.0	0	1	14.40	0
