= 1908 Cleveland Naps season =

1908 Cleveland Naps
- League: American League
- Ballpark: League Park
- City: Cleveland, Ohio
- Record: 90–64 (.584)
- League place: 2nd
- Owners: Charles Somers
- Managers: Nap Lajoie

The 1908 Cleveland Naps season was a season in American baseball. The team finished second in the American League with a record of 90–64, just one-half game behind the Detroit Tigers. The Naps finished with the same number of wins as the Tigers, but with one additional loss. By the standard of the era, that gave the Tigers the pennant.

== Regular season ==
=== Season standings ===
American League
Team	W	L	Pct.	GB	Home	Road
Detroit Tigers	90	63	.588	—	44‍–‍33	46‍–‍30
Cleveland Naps	90	64	.584	½	51‍–‍26	39‍–‍38
Chicago White Sox	88	64	.579	1½	51‍–‍25	37‍–‍39
St. Louis Browns	83	69	.546	6½	46‍–‍31	37‍–‍38
Boston Red Sox	75	79	.487	15½	37‍–‍40	38‍–‍39
Philadelphia Athletics	68	85	.444	22	46‍–‍30	22‍–‍55
Washington Senators	67	85	.441	22½	43‍–‍32	24‍–‍53
New York Highlanders	51	103	.331	39½	30‍–‍47	21‍–‍56

=== Record vs. opponents ===
1908 American League record Sources:
Team	BOS	CWS	CLE	DET	NYH	PHA	SLB	WSH
Boston	—	6–16–1	10–12	11–11	12–10	10–12	15–7	11–11
Chicago	16–6–1	—	8–14–1	9–13	16–6	13–9	11–10	15–6–2
Cleveland	12–10	14–8–1	—	13–9	16–6	16–6–1	11–11–1	8–14
Detroit	11–11	13–9	9–13	—	15–7	14–8–1	12–10	16–5
New York	10–12	6–16	6–16	7–15	—	8–14–1	5–17	9–13
Philadelphia	12–10	9–13	6–16–1	8–14–1	14–8–1	—	8–13–1	11–11
St. Louis	7–15	10–11	11–11–1	10–12	17–5	13–8–1	—	15–7–1
Washington	11–11	6–15–2	14–8	5–16	13–9	11–11	7–15–1	—

=== Roster ===
1908 Cleveland Naps
Roster
Pitchers: Heinie Berger; Charlie Chech; Walter Clarkson; Cy Falkenberg; Ed Foster; Jack Graney; Otto Hess; Addie Joss; Bill Lattimore; Glenn Liebhardt; Bob Rhoads; Jack Ryan; Jake Thielman	Catchers: Harry Bemis; Nig Clarke; Homer Davidson; Grover Land; Infielders: Bill Bradley; Nap Lajoie; Deacon McGuire; Rabbit Nill; George Perring; George Stovall	Outfielders: Dave Altizer; Harry Bay; Joe Birmingham; Josh Clarke; Elmer Flick; Wilbur Good; Charlie Hickman; Bill Hinchman; Denny Sullivan; Terry Turner	Manager: Nap Lajoie

== Player stats ==
=== Batting ===
==== Starters by position ====
Note: Pos = Position; G = Games played; AB = At bats; H = Hits; Avg. = Batting average; HR = Home runs; RBI = Runs batted in

Pos	Player	G	AB	H	Avg.	HR	RBI
C	Nig Clarke	97	290	70	.241	1	27
1B	George Stovall	138	534	156	.292	2	45
2B	Nap Lajoie	157	581	168	.289	2	74
SS	George Perring	89	310	67	.216	0	19
3B	Bill Bradley	148	548	133	.243	1	46
OF	Bill Hinchman	137	464	107	.231	6	59
OF	Joe Birmingham	122	413	88	.213	2	38
OF	Josh Clarke	131	492	119	.242	1	21

==== Other batters ====
Note: G = Games played; AB = At bats; H = Hits; Avg. = Batting average; HR = Home runs; RBI = Runs batted in

Player	G	AB	H	Avg.	HR	RBI
Harry Bemis	91	277	62	.224	0	33
Terry Turner	60	201	48	.239	0	19
Charlie Hickman	65	197	46	.234	2	16
Wilbur Good	46	154	43	.279	1	14
Dave Altizer	29	89	19	.213	0	5
Elmer Flick	9	35	8	.229	0	2
Rabbit Nill	11	23	5	.217	0	1
Grover Land	8	16	3	.188	0	2
Otto Hess	9	14	0	.000	0	0
Denny Sullivan	4	6	0	.000	0	0
Deacon McGuire	1	4	1	.250	0	2
Homer Davidson	9	4	0	.000	0	0
Harry Bay	2	0	0	----	0	0

=== Pitching ===
==== Starting pitchers ====
Note: G = Games pitched; IP = Innings pitched; W = Wins; L = Losses; ERA = Earned run average; SO = Strikeouts

Player	G	IP	W	L	ERA	SO
Addie Joss	42	325.0	24	11	1.16	130
Bob Rhoads	37	270.0	18	12	1.77	62
Glenn Liebhardt	38	262.0	15	16	2.20	146
Heinie Berger	29	199.1	13	8	2.12	101
Charlie Chech	27	165.2	11	7	1.74	51
Jake Thielman	11	61.2	4	3	3.65	15
Cy Falkenberg	8	46.1	2	4	3.88	17
Bill Lattimore	4	24.0	1	2	4.50	5

==== Other pitchers ====
Note: G = Games pitched; IP = Innings pitched; W = Wins; L = Losses; ERA = Earned run average; SO = Strikeouts

Player	G	IP	W	L	ERA	SO
Jack Ryan	8	35.2	1	1	2.27	7
Ed Foster	6	21.0	1	0	2.14	11
Walter Clarkson	2	3.1	0	0	10.80	1

==== Relief pitchers ====
Note: G = Games pitched; W = Wins; L = Losses; SV = Saves; ERA = Earned run average; SO = Strikeouts

Player	G	W	L	SV	ERA	SO
Otto Hess	4	0	0	0	5.14	2
Jack Graney	2	0	0	0	5.40	0
