= 1908 Philadelphia Athletics season =

1908 Philadelphia Athletics
- League: American League
- Ballpark: Columbia Park
- City: Philadelphia
- Record: 68–85 (.444)
- League place: 6th
- Owners: Benjamin Shibe, Tom Shibe, John Shibe, Connie Mack, Sam Jones, Frank Hough
- Managers: Connie Mack

The 1908 Philadelphia Athletics season involved the A's finishing sixth in the American League with a record of 68 wins and 85 losses.

== Preseason ==
=== 1908 Philadelphia City Series ===
The Athletics played four games against the Philadelphia Phillies for the local championship in the pre-season city series. The Athletics defeated the Phillies 3 games to 1.

AL Philadelphia Athletics (3) vs. NL Philadelphia Phillies (1)

| Game | Date | Score | Location | Time | Attendance |
|---|---|---|---|---|---|
| 1 | April 3, 1908 | No Game - Cold | Philadelphia Ball Park | - | - |
| 2 | April 4, 1908 | No Game - Cold | Columbia Park | - | - |
| 3 | April 6, 1908 | Philadelphia Athletics – 5, Philadelphia Phillies – 0 | Philadelphia Ball Park | 1:45 | 9,108 |
| 4 | April 7, 1908 | Philadelphia Phillies – 6, Philadelphia Athletics – 7 | Columbia Park | 1:47 | - |
| 5 | April 8, 1908 | No Game - Rain | Philadelphia Ball Park | - | - |
| 6 | April 9, 1908 | Philadelphia Phillies – 2, Philadelphia Athletics – 0 | Columbia Park | 1:42 | 5,246 |
| 7 | April 10, 1908 | No Game - Rain | Philadelphia Ball Park | - | - |
| 8 | April 11, 1908 | Philadelphia Athletics – 5, Philadelphia Phillies – 0 | Philadelphia Ball Park | 1:45 | 10,953 |

The A's record against the Phillies was 21–20 all time after the 1908 series.

== Regular season ==
Shoeless Joe Jackson made his major league debut with the Athletics at Columbia Park on August 25, 1908 in a 3-2 loss to Cleveland playing centerfield and batting fourth. Jackson had hit .346 in 1908 for the Class-D Carolina Association Greenville Spinners and his appearance was anticipated by the press and fans. Jackson came to bat with one out in the first with Topsy Hartsel on third and Eddie Collins on first to face Cleveland's Heinie Berger. "The youngster was given a kindly welcome by the fans and he acknowledged it by singling past Bradley, scoring Hartsel." Jackson would finish 1 for 4 in the game.

This is the only losing season in Athletics franchise history that was not part of consecutive losing seasons.

=== Season standings ===
American League
| Team | W | L | Pct. | GB | Home | Road |
|---|---|---|---|---|---|---|
| Detroit Tigers | 90 | 63 | .588 | — | 44‍–‍33 | 46‍–‍30 |
| Cleveland Naps | 90 | 64 | .584 | ½ | 51‍–‍26 | 39‍–‍38 |
| Chicago White Sox | 88 | 64 | .579 | 1½ | 51‍–‍25 | 37‍–‍39 |
| St. Louis Browns | 83 | 69 | .546 | 6½ | 46‍–‍31 | 37‍–‍38 |
| Boston Red Sox | 75 | 79 | .487 | 15½ | 37‍–‍40 | 38‍–‍39 |
| Philadelphia Athletics | 68 | 85 | .444 | 22 | 46‍–‍30 | 22‍–‍55 |
| Washington Senators | 67 | 85 | .441 | 22½ | 43‍–‍32 | 24‍–‍53 |
| New York Highlanders | 51 | 103 | .331 | 39½ | 30‍–‍47 | 21‍–‍56 |

=== Record vs. opponents ===
1908 American League record Sources:
| Team | BOS | CWS | CLE | DET | NYH | PHA | SLB | WSH |
|---|---|---|---|---|---|---|---|---|
| Boston | — | 6–16–1 | 10–12 | 11–11 | 12–10 | 10–12 | 15–7 | 11–11 |
| Chicago | 16–6–1 | — | 8–14–1 | 9–13 | 16–6 | 13–9 | 11–10 | 15–6–2 |
| Cleveland | 12–10 | 14–8–1 | — | 13–9 | 16–6 | 16–6–1 | 11–11–1 | 8–14 |
| Detroit | 11–11 | 13–9 | 9–13 | — | 15–7 | 14–8–1 | 12–10 | 16–5 |
| New York | 10–12 | 6–16 | 6–16 | 7–15 | — | 8–14–1 | 5–17 | 9–13 |
| Philadelphia | 12–10 | 9–13 | 6–16–1 | 8–14–1 | 14–8–1 | — | 8–13–1 | 11–11 |
| St. Louis | 7–15 | 10–11 | 11–11–1 | 10–12 | 17–5 | 13–8–1 | — | 15–7–1 |
| Washington | 11–11 | 6–15–2 | 14–8 | 5–16 | 13–9 | 11–11 | 7–15–1 | — |

=== Roster ===
1908 Philadelphia Athletics
Roster
| Pitchers: Chief Bender; Nick Carter; Jimmy Dygert; Eddie Files; Jack Flater; Al Kellogg; Harry Krause; Doc Martin; Bert Maxwell; Eddie Plank; Gus Salve; Biff Schlitzer; Rube Vickers | Catchers: Bert Blue; Ben Egan; Jack Lapp; Doc Powers; Ossee Schreckengost; Syd Smith; Infielders: Frank Baker; Scotty Barr; Jack Barry; Eddie Collins; Jimmy Collins; Harry Davis; Frank Manush; Simon Nicholls | Outfielders: Jack Coombs; Jack Fox; Topsy Hartsel; Joe Jackson; Herbie Moran; Danny Murphy; Rube Oldring; Socks Seybold; Shag Shaughnessy; Amos Strunk | Manager: Connie Mack |

== Player stats ==
=== Batting ===
==== Starters by position ====
Note: Pos = Position; G = Games played; AB = At bats; H = Hits; Avg. = Batting average; HR = Home runs; RBI = Runs batted in

| Pos | Player | G | AB | H | Avg. | HR | RBI |
|---|---|---|---|---|---|---|---|
| C | Ossee Schreckengost | 71 | 207 | 46 | .222 | 0 | 16 |
| 1B | Harry Davis | 147 | 513 | 127 | .248 | 5 | 62 |
| 2B | Eddie Collins | 102 | 330 | 90 | .273 | 1 | 40 |
| SS | Simon Nicholls | 150 | 550 | 119 | .216 | 4 | 31 |
| 3B | Jimmy Collins | 115 | 433 | 94 | .217 | 0 | 30 |
| OF | Topsy Hartsel | 129 | 460 | 112 | .243 | 4 | 29 |
| OF | Rube Oldring | 116 | 434 | 96 | .221 | 1 | 39 |
| OF | Danny Murphy | 142 | 525 | 139 | .265 | 4 | 66 |

==== Other batters ====
Note: G = Games played; AB = At bats; H = Hits; Avg. = Batting average; HR = Home runs; RBI = Runs batted in

| Player | G | AB | H | Avg. | HR | RBI |
|---|---|---|---|---|---|---|
| Jack Coombs | 78 | 220 | 56 | .255 | 1 | 23 |
| Doc Powers | 62 | 172 | 31 | .180 | 0 | 7 |
| Jack Barry | 40 | 135 | 30 | .222 | 0 | 8 |
| Socks Seybold | 48 | 130 | 28 | .215 | 0 | 3 |
| Syd Smith | 46 | 128 | 26 | .203 | 1 | 10 |
| Frank Manush | 23 | 77 | 12 | .156 | 0 | 0 |
| Herbie Moran | 19 | 59 | 9 | .153 | 0 | 4 |
| Scotty Barr | 19 | 56 | 8 | .143 | 0 | 1 |
| Jack Lapp | 13 | 35 | 5 | .143 | 0 | 1 |
| Amos Strunk | 12 | 34 | 8 | .235 | 0 | 0 |
| Frank Baker | 9 | 31 | 9 | .290 | 0 | 2 |
| Jack Fox | 9 | 30 | 6 | .200 | 0 | 0 |
| Shag Shaughnessy | 8 | 29 | 9 | .310 | 0 | 1 |
| Joe Jackson | 5 | 23 | 3 | .130 | 0 | 3 |
| Bert Blue | 6 | 18 | 3 | .167 | 0 | 1 |
| Ben Egan | 2 | 6 | 1 | .167 | 0 | 0 |

=== Pitching ===
==== Starting pitchers ====
Note: G = Games pitched; IP = Innings pitched; W = Wins; L = Losses; ERA = Earned run average; SO = Strikeouts

| Player | G | IP | W | L | ERA | SO |
|---|---|---|---|---|---|---|
| Rube Vickers | 53 | 317.0 | 18 | 19 | 2.21 | 156 |
| Eddie Plank | 34 | 244.2 | 14 | 16 | 2.17 | 135 |
| Jimmy Dygert | 41 | 238.2 | 11 | 15 | 2.87 | 164 |
| Jack Coombs | 26 | 153.0 | 7 | 5 | 2.00 | 80 |
| Chief Bender | 18 | 138.2 | 8 | 9 | 1.75 | 85 |
| Biff Schlitzer | 24 | 131.0 | 6 | 8 | 3.16 | 57 |
| Al Kellogg | 3 | 17.0 | 0 | 2 | 5.82 | 8 |
| Doc Martin | 1 | 2.0 | 0 | 1 | 13.50 | 2 |

==== Other pitchers ====
Note: G = Games pitched; IP = Innings pitched; W = Wins; L = Losses; ERA = Earned run average; SO = Strikeouts

| Player | G | IP | W | L | ERA | SO |
|---|---|---|---|---|---|---|
| Nick Carter | 14 | 60.2 | 2 | 5 | 2.97 | 17 |
| Jack Flater | 5 | 39.1 | 1 | 3 | 2.06 | 8 |
| Harry Krause | 4 | 21.0 | 1 | 1 | 2.57 | 10 |
| Gus Salve | 2 | 15.1 | 0 | 1 | 4.11 | 6 |

==== Relief pitchers ====
Note: G = Games pitched; W = Wins; L = Losses; SV = Saves; ERA = Earned run average; SO = Strikeouts

| Player | G | W | L | SV | ERA | SO |
|---|---|---|---|---|---|---|
| Bert Maxwell | 4 | 0 | 0 | 0 | 11.08 | 7 |
| Eddie Files | 2 | 0 | 0 | 0 | 6.00 | 6 |
