= 1908 in baseball =

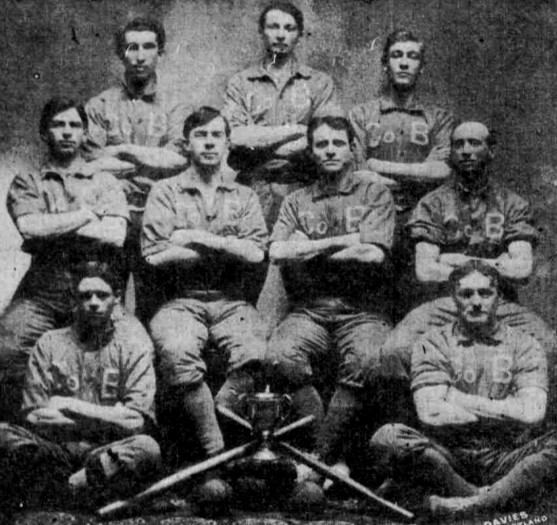

The following are the baseball events of the year 1908 throughout the world.

== Champions ==
- World Series: Chicago Cubs over Detroit Tigers (4–1)
- Southern Association: Nashville Vols over New Orleans Pelicans (1–0)

== Statistical leaders ==
	American League		National League	
Stat	Player	Total	Player	Total
AVG	Ty Cobb (DET)	.324	Honus Wagner (PIT)	.354
HR	Sam Crawford (DET)	7	Tim Jordan (BRO)	12
RBI	Ty Cobb (DET)	108	Honus Wagner (PIT)	109
W	Ed Walsh (CWS)	40	Christy Mathewson^{1} (NYG)	37
ERA	Addie Joss (CLE)	1.16	Christy Mathewson^{1} (NYG)	1.43
K	Ed Walsh (CWS)	269	Christy Mathewson^{1} (NYG)	259

^{1} National League Triple Crown pitching winner

== Major league baseball final standings ==
=== American League final standings ===
American League
Team	W	L	Pct.	GB	Home	Road
Detroit Tigers	90	63	.588	—	44‍–‍33	46‍–‍30
Cleveland Naps	90	64	.584	½	51‍–‍26	39‍–‍38
Chicago White Sox	88	64	.579	1½	51‍–‍25	37‍–‍39
St. Louis Browns	83	69	.546	6½	46‍–‍31	37‍–‍38
Boston Red Sox	75	79	.487	15½	37‍–‍40	38‍–‍39
Philadelphia Athletics	68	85	.444	22	46‍–‍30	22‍–‍55
Washington Senators	67	85	.441	22½	43‍–‍32	24‍–‍53
New York Highlanders	51	103	.331	39½	30‍–‍47	21‍–‍56

Locations of teams for the 1908 American League season
American League

=== National League final standings ===
National League
Team	W	L	Pct.	GB	Home	Road
Chicago Cubs	99	55	.643	—	47‍–‍30	52‍–‍25
New York Giants	98	56	.636	1	52‍–‍25	46‍–‍31
Pittsburgh Pirates	98	56	.636	1	42‍–‍35	56‍–‍21
Philadelphia Phillies	83	71	.539	16	43‍–‍34	40‍–‍37
Cincinnati Reds	73	81	.474	26	40‍–‍37	33‍–‍44
Boston Doves	63	91	.409	36	35‍–‍42	28‍–‍49
Brooklyn Superbas	53	101	.344	46	27‍–‍50	26‍–‍51
St. Louis Cardinals	49	105	.318	50	28‍–‍49	21‍–‍56

Locations of teams for the 1907–1908 National League seasons
National League

== Events ==
=== January–March ===
- February 27 – The sacrifice fly rule is adopted. No at bat is charged if a run scores after the catch of a fly ball. The rule will be repealed in 1931, then reinstated (or changed) several times before gaining permanent acceptance in 1954.

=== April–June ===
- June 30 – Cy Young pitches the third, and final, no-hitter of his career as the Boston Red Sox defeat the New York Highlanders, 8–0.

=== July–September ===
- July 4 – One batter away from a perfect game, New York Giants pitcher Hooks Wiltse hits George McQuillan with two outs in the ninth inning. Wiltse continues to pitch and tosses a no-hitter against the Philadelphia Phillies. The Giants win, 1–0, in 10 innings.
- August 4 – In a game between the St. Louis Cardinals and the Brooklyn Superbas only one baseball was used for the entire game. Brooklyn wins, 3–0.
- September 5 – Nap Rucker pitches a no-hitter as the Brooklyn Superbas defeat the Boston Doves, 6–0.
- September 18 – Cleveland Naps pitcher Bob Rhoads tosses a no-hitter against the Boston Red Sox, Cleveland wins, 2–1.
- September 20 – Frank Smith of the Chicago White Sox throws a no-hitter against the Philadelphia Athletics, the White Sox win, 1–0. It is the second no-hitter of Smith's career.
- September 23 – The Chicago Cubs and New York Giants, involved in a tight pennant race, (also involving the Pittsburgh Pirates) were tied in the bottom of the ninth inning at the Polo Grounds. The Giants had runners on first and third and two outs when Al Bridwell hit a single to center field, scoring Moose McCormick from third with the Giants' apparent winning run, but the runner on first base, rookie Fred Merkle, thinking the game was over, went halfway to second and then sprinted to the clubhouse after McCormick touched home plate. As fans swarmed the field, Cub infielder Johnny Evers retrieved the ball and touched second. A forceout was called at second base, nullifying the single, and since there were 2 outs when the play started, the run was also nullified and the inning ended. The game was declared a tie and would be made up at the end of the season if the Cubs and Giants were tied for first place. The incident became known as "Merkle's Boner".
- September 26 – Ed Reulbach of the Chicago Cubs pitches two shutouts in the same day, whitewashing the Brooklyn Superbas 5–0 on a five-hitter and 3–0 on a three-hitter. The entire doubleheader is played in less than three hours. Reulbach allows five hits in the morning game, and is even stingier in the afternoon, yielding three hits and a walk. Kaiser Wilhelm and Jim Pastorius are the losing pitchers.

=== October–December ===
- October 2:
  - In a game involving the Cleveland Naps and the Chicago White Sox, Ed Walsh struck out 15 Naps and walked one batter, pitching a complete game, but it was not enough as Addie Joss pitched a perfect game, as the Naps beat the White Sox, 1–0, during the heat of a pennant race. Cleveland center fielder Joe Birmingham scored the game's only run. Joss' perfect game is the second in the modern era and fourth all time. It is perhaps the finest pitching duel in baseball history.
  - Washington Senators outfielder Otis Clymer hits for the cycle in a 12–2 Washington victory over the New York Highlanders.
- October 6 – The Detroit Tigers defeat the Chicago White Sox, 7–0, to win the American League pennant on the last day of the season.
- October 8 – The Chicago Cubs defeat the New York Giants, 4–2, in the make-up of the Merkle's Boner game, giving the Cubs the National League pennant.
- October 14:
  - The Chicago Cubs defeat the Detroit Tigers, 2–0, in Game 5 of the World Series to win the series four games to one. It is the second consecutive World Championship for the Cubs and the second year in a row they have defeated the Tigers in the World Series. The Cubs did not win another World Series until 2016, when they defeated Cleveland Indians in seven games, ending its 108 year championship drought.
  - October 14 – The baseball season of 1908 ends with the lowest runs per game average in major league baseball history at 3.38. This outcome was likely an important factor in the decision to trial a livelier "cork center" ball in both leagues the following season.
- October 24 – "Take Me Out to the Ball Game" is introduced by singer Billy Murray. The songwriting team of Albert Von Tilzer (music) and Jack Norworth (lyrics) who created the immortal tune have never seen a game. Over the past 100 years, more than 400 musicians from every conceivable genre have recorded the song.
- November 22 – In the first game ever between a Japanese and an American professional team, the Reach All-Americans defeat Waseda University in Tokyo, 5–0.

== Births ==
=== January ===
- January 4 – George Selkirk
- January 5 – Regis Leheny
- January 13 – Jimmy Jordan
- January 16 – Johnny Watson
- January 17 – Les Willis

=== February ===
- February 1 – Vince Barton
- February 2 – Bobby Coombs
- February 2 – Wes Ferrell
- February 4 – Hank Garrity
- February 9 – Buzz Boyle
- February 13 – Gilly Campbell
- February 14 – Oscar Judd
- February 17 – Red Barber
- February 23 – Ray Brown
- February 23 – Bob Boken
- February 25 – Al Hollingsworth

=== March ===
- March 1 – Tadashi Wakabayashi
- March 2 – Orville Armbrust
- March 7 – Harry Davis
- March 9 – Myril Hoag
- March 12 – Bob Barr
- March 13 – Harlin Pool
- March 19 – Gee Walker
- March 29 – Gibby Brack
- March 29 – Bill Strickland

=== April ===
- April 6 – Dick Gyselman
- April 6 – Ernie Lombardi
- April 6 – Joe Mowry
- April 7 – George Hockette
- April 8 – Buck Fausett
- April 12 – Joe Vitelli
- April 16 – Babe Phelps
- April 18 – Ed Boland
- April 22 – Fabian Kowalik

=== May ===
- May 5 – Tony Freitas
- May 6 – Jack Owens
- May 9 – Billy Jurges
- May 17 – Leo Norris
- May 25 – Howard Craghead
- May 27 – Euel Moore

=== June ===
- June 4 – Orville Jorgens
- June 4 – Bob Klinger
- June 6 – Izzy Goldstein
- June 9 – Paul Gregory
- June 10 – Mike Kreevich
- June 19 – Bill Swift
- June 20 – Billy Werber
- June 22 – Harry Rosenberg
- June 25 – Joe Becker

=== July ===
- July 6 – Cy Blanton
- July 14 – Johnny Murphy
- July 15 – Jake Powell
- July 16 – Floyd Newkirk
- July 17 – Ed Connolly
- July 20 – Ed Madjeski
- July 23 – Ival Goodman
- July 30 – Frankie Pytlak

=== August ===
- August 7 – Clyde Hatter
- August 8 – Bo Briggery
- August 10 – Odell Hale
- August 10 – Bill Trotter
- August 15 – Bernie Walter
- August 16 – Andy Bednar
- August 18 – Jim Peterson
- August 20 – Al López
- August 28 – Don Savidge

=== September ===
- September 2 – Monte Pearson
- September 12 – Jim McLeod
- September 13 – Otho Nitcholas
- September 14 – John Bottarini
- September 16 – Buster Mills
- September 18 – Lefty Guise
- September 20 – Zeke Bonura
- September 20 – Eddie Hurley
- September 22 – Jim Holloway
- September 28 – Carl Sumner

=== October ===
- October 2 – Ray Lucas
- October 6 – Tom Padden
- October 12 – Johnny Markham
- October 15 – Hugo Klaerner
- October 17 – Red Rolfe
- October 18 – Andy Spognardi
- October 24 – Ralph Onis

=== November ===
- November 3 – Red Phillips
- November 5 – Ralph Birkofer
- November 8 – John Stoneham
- November 9 – Roy Schalk
- November 13 – John Kroner
- November 19 – Harley Boss
- November 19 – Joe Glenn
- November 21 – Paul Richards
- November 26 – Lefty Gomez
- November 29 – Pat Simmons

=== December ===
- December 1 – Les Munns
- December 10 – Earl Cook
- December 12 – Flea Clifton
- December 14 – Terry Lyons
- December 16 – Emil Mailho
- December 18 – Jimmy Pattison
- December 20 – Art McLarney
- December 22 – Ed Fallenstein
- December 23 – Sol Carter
- December 25 – Ben Chapman
- December 25 – Alta Cohen
- December 25 – Jo-Jo Moore

== Deaths ==
=== January–April ===
- January 14 – Sim Bullas, 45, outfielder for the 1884 Toledo Blue Stockings.
- January 14 – Henry Krug, 41, utility for the 1902 Philadelphia Phillies.
- February 6 – Samuel F. Angus, 52, owner of the Detroit Tigers from November 1901 to October 1903.
- February 20 – Wallace Terry, 57, first baseman/outfielder for the 1875 Washington Nationals.
- March 12 – Fred Ketcham, 32, outfielder for the Louisville Colonels (1899) and Philadelphia Athletics (1901).
- March 27 – Forrest Crawford, 26, shortstop who played 1906 through 1907 for the St. Louis Cardinals.
- March 30 – Charlie Sweasy, 60, second baseman for 1869 Cincinnati Red Stockings. Played seven years in the National Association and the National League.
- April 6 – Jim Brown, 47, pitcher and outfielder for two seasons, 1884 and 1886.
- April 10 – Mike Griffin, 43, center fielder for Baltimore and Brooklyn who batted .300 six times, scored 100 runs ten times; led league in runs and doubles once each.
- April 13 – John Kelly, 49, 19th century catcher, manager and umpire.
- April 20 – Henry Chadwick, 83, the "Father of Baseball", who through his writings, analysis of statistics and service in developing the sport's rules played a principal role in establishing baseball as the "national pastime"; devised the box score, developed scoring system which enabled recording of every play, authored the first rule book in 1858, and created statistics including batting average and earned run average; worked to revise sport's rules so as to balance offense and defense, and to increase mental demands as well as physical ones.

=== May–August ===
- May 9 – Charlie Nyce, 37, shortstop for the 1895 Boston Beaneaters.
- May 14 – John O'Connell, 35, played in only the 1891 and 1902 seasons.
- May 24 – Pete Hasney, 43, played for the 1890 Philadelphia Athletics of the American Association.
- June 16 – Ned Garvin, 34, pitcher who posted a 57–97 record and a 2.72 ERA for five different teams between 1896 and 1904.
- June 22 – Everett Mills, 63, first baseman for six seasons, 1871–1876.
- June 23 – Bill Traffley, 38, catcher for the 1878 Chicago White Stockings.
- July 18 – John Brown, 31, pitcher for the 1897 Brooklyn Bridegrooms.
- July 22 – Andy Sommers, 42, catcher who played with six clubs from 1897 to 1890.
- August 19 – Doc Bushong, 51, catcher for 13 seasons (1875–1876, 1880–1890), who played on five league championship teams.
- August 20 – Marty Honan, 39, catcher for the 1891 Chicago Colts of the National League.
- August 24 – George Meister, 44, German third baseman who hit .194 in 34 games for the 1884 Toledo Blue Stockings.

=== September–December ===
- September 7 – Bill Morgan, 52, outfielder and shortstop who played with the Pittsburgh Alleghenys (1883) and Washington Nationals (1884).
- September 14 – Ike Van Zandt, 32, outfielder and pitcher who played for the New York Giants (1901), Chicago Cubs (1904) and St. Louis Browns (1905).
- September 18 – Dickey Pearce, 72, shortstop (in the sport's earliest era) whose career spanned the years 1856 to 1877; introduced the bunt and pioneered defensive play at his position, later became an umpire.
- September 25 – Frank Robison, 55 or 56, co-owner (with his brother Stanford) of the St. Louis Cardinals from 1899 until his death; previously co-owner of the Cleveland Spiders from 1897 to 1899.
- September 28 – Tom Pratt, 64, played at first base for one game with the 1871 Philadelphia Athletics.
- November 5 – Pat Hannivan, 42, outfielder and second baseman for the 1897 Brooklyn Bridegrooms.
- December 8 – Frank Griffith, 36, pitcher for the Chicago Cubs (1892) and Cleveland Spiders (1894).
- December 10 – Wild Bill Widner, 41, pitcher who posted a 22–36 record and a 4.36 ERA with the Red Stockings, Nationals, Solons and Kelly's Killers from 1887 to 1891.
- December 19 – Reddy Foster, 44, pinch hitter for the 1896 New York Giants.
- December 26 – Charlie Householder, 52, third baseman/left fielder/shortstop who hit .239 in 83 games for the 1884 Chicago/Pittsburgh team of the Union Association.
- December 26 – Shadow Pyle, 47, pitcher for the Philadelphia Quakers (1884) and Chicago White Stockings (1887).

== Bibliography ==
- Fleming, G.H. (2006). The Unforgettable Season. Bison Books. ISBN 0-8032-6922-6.
- Murphy, Cait (2007). Crazy '08: How a Cast of Cranks, Rogues, Boneheads, and Magnates Created the Greatest Year in Baseball History. Collins. ISBN 978-0-06-088937-1.
