= 1908 New York Highlanders season =

Baseball team season

1908 New York Highlanders
- League: American League
- Ballpark: Hilltop Park
- City: New York, New York
- Record: 51–103 (.331)
- League place: 8th
- Owners: William Devery and Frank Farrell
- Managers: Clark Griffith, Kid Elberfeld

The 1908 New York Highlanders season finished with the team in eighth place in the American League with a record of 51–103. Their home games were played at Hilltop Park.

The Highlanders finished in last place, 17 games out of seventh. It was the second-worst season in club history. Starting first baseman Hal Chase left the team in September under allegations that he was throwing games. After Clark Griffith's departure, the Highlanders lost 70 of their last 98 games under new manager Kid Elberfeld.

== Regular season ==
On June 30, Cy Young of the Boston Red Sox threw a no-hitter against the Highlanders. In the game, Young had 3 hits and 4 RBI's. By now the alternate and equally unofficial nickname "Yankees" was being used frequently to refer to the Highlanders. The New York Times article about Young's no-hitter at "the American League Park" (Hilltop Park's formal name), referred to the club exclusively as "Yankees" throughout the article. Other newspapers continued to use the two nicknames interchangeably.

On September 4, 5 and 7, 1908, Walter Johnson of the Washington Senators shut out the Highlanders in three consecutive games.

=== Season standings ===
American League
| Team | W | L | Pct. | GB | Home | Road |
|---|---|---|---|---|---|---|
| Detroit Tigers | 90 | 63 | .588 | — | 44‍–‍33 | 46‍–‍30 |
| Cleveland Naps | 90 | 64 | .584 | ½ | 51‍–‍26 | 39‍–‍38 |
| Chicago White Sox | 88 | 64 | .579 | 1½ | 51‍–‍25 | 37‍–‍39 |
| St. Louis Browns | 83 | 69 | .546 | 6½ | 46‍–‍31 | 37‍–‍38 |
| Boston Red Sox | 75 | 79 | .487 | 15½ | 37‍–‍40 | 38‍–‍39 |
| Philadelphia Athletics | 68 | 85 | .444 | 22 | 46‍–‍30 | 22‍–‍55 |
| Washington Senators | 67 | 85 | .441 | 22½ | 43‍–‍32 | 24‍–‍53 |
| New York Highlanders | 51 | 103 | .331 | 39½ | 30‍–‍47 | 21‍–‍56 |

=== Record vs. opponents ===
1908 American League record Sources:
| Team | BOS | CWS | CLE | DET | NYH | PHA | SLB | WSH |
|---|---|---|---|---|---|---|---|---|
| Boston | — | 6–16–1 | 10–12 | 11–11 | 12–10 | 10–12 | 15–7 | 11–11 |
| Chicago | 16–6–1 | — | 8–14–1 | 9–13 | 16–6 | 13–9 | 11–10 | 15–6–2 |
| Cleveland | 12–10 | 14–8–1 | — | 13–9 | 16–6 | 16–6–1 | 11–11–1 | 8–14 |
| Detroit | 11–11 | 13–9 | 9–13 | — | 15–7 | 14–8–1 | 12–10 | 16–5 |
| New York | 10–12 | 6–16 | 6–16 | 7–15 | — | 8–14–1 | 5–17 | 9–13 |
| Philadelphia | 12–10 | 9–13 | 6–16–1 | 8–14–1 | 14–8–1 | — | 8–13–1 | 11–11 |
| St. Louis | 7–15 | 10–11 | 11–11–1 | 10–12 | 17–5 | 13–8–1 | — | 15–7–1 |
| Washington | 11–11 | 6–15–2 | 14–8 | 5–16 | 13–9 | 11–11 | 7–15–1 | — |

=== Roster ===
1908 New York Highlanders
Roster
| Pitchers: Harry Billiard; Jack Chesbro; Slow Joe Doyle; Fred Glade; Bill Hogg; Joe Lake; Rube Manning; Doc Newton; Andy O'Connor; Al Orth; Hippo Vaughn; Jack Warhop; Pete Wilson | Catchers: Walter Blair; Red Kleinow; Ed Sweeney; Infielders: Neal Ball; Hal Chase; Wid Conroy; Mike Donovan; Kid Elberfeld; Earle Gardner; Frank LaPorte; George Moriarty; Harry Niles | Outfielders: Birdie Cree; Frank Delahanty; Charlie Hemphill; Willie Keeler; Irish McIlveen; Jimmy O'Rourke; Jake Stahl | Manager: Clark Griffith; Kid Elberfeld |

== Player stats ==
=== Batting ===
==== Starters by position ====
Note: Pos = Position; G = Games played; AB = At bats; H = Hits; Avg. = Batting average; HR = Home runs; RBI = Runs batted in

| Pos | Player | G | AB | H | Avg. | HR | RBI |
|---|---|---|---|---|---|---|---|
| C | Red Kleinow | 96 | 279 | 47 | .168 | 1 | 13 |
| 1B | Hal Chase | 106 | 405 | 104 | .257 | 1 | 36 |
| 2B | Harry Niles | 95 | 361 | 90 | .249 | 4 | 24 |
| SS | Neal Ball | 132 | 446 | 110 | .247 | 0 | 38 |
| 3B | Wid Conroy | 141 | 531 | 126 | .237 | 1 | 39 |
| OF | Willie Keeler | 91 | 323 | 85 | .263 | 1 | 14 |
| OF | Jake Stahl | 75 | 274 | 70 | .255 | 2 | 42 |
| OF | Charlie Hemphill | 142 | 505 | 150 | .297 | 0 | 44 |

==== Other batters ====
Note: G = Games played; AB = At bats; H = Hits; Avg. = Batting average; HR = Home runs; RBI = Runs batted in

| Player | G | AB | H | Avg. | HR | RBI |
|---|---|---|---|---|---|---|
| George Moriarty | 101 | 348 | 82 | .236 | 0 | 27 |
| Walter Blair | 76 | 211 | 40 | .190 | 1 | 13 |
| Irish McIlveen | 44 | 169 | 36 | .213 | 0 | 8 |
| Frank LaPorte | 39 | 145 | 38 | .262 | 1 | 15 |
| Frank Delahanty | 37 | 125 | 32 | .256 | 0 | 10 |
| Jimmy O'Rourke | 34 | 108 | 25 | .231 | 0 | 3 |
| Ed Sweeney | 32 | 82 | 12 | .146 | 0 | 2 |
| Birdie Cree | 21 | 78 | 21 | .269 | 0 | 4 |
| Earle Gardner | 20 | 75 | 16 | .213 | 0 | 4 |
| Kid Elberfeld | 19 | 56 | 11 | .196 | 0 | 5 |
| Mike Donovan | 5 | 19 | 5 | .263 | 0 | 2 |

=== Pitching ===
==== Starting pitchers ====
Note: G = Games pitched; IP = Innings pitched; W = Wins; L = Losses; ERA = Earned run average; SO = Strikeouts

| Player | G | IP | W | L | ERA | SO |
|---|---|---|---|---|---|---|
| Jack Chesbro | 45 | 288.2 | 14 | 20 | 2.93 | 124 |
| Joe Lake | 38 | 269.1 | 9 | 22 | 3.17 | 118 |
| Rube Manning | 41 | 245.0 | 13 | 16 | 2.94 | 113 |
| Bill Hogg | 24 | 152.1 | 4 | 16 | 3.01 | 72 |
| Al Orth | 21 | 139.1 | 2 | 13 | 3.42 | 22 |
| Pete Wilson | 6 | 39.0 | 3 | 3 | 3.46 | 28 |
| Jack Warhop | 5 | 36.1 | 1 | 2 | 4.46 | 11 |
| Fred Glade | 5 | 32.0 | 0 | 4 | 4.22 | 11 |
| Andy O'Connor | 1 | 8.0 | 0 | 1 | 10.13 | 5 |

==== Other pitchers ====
Note: G = Games pitched; IP = Innings pitched; W = Wins; L = Losses; ERA = Earned run average; SO = Strikeouts

| Player | G | IP | W | L | ERA | SO |
|---|---|---|---|---|---|---|
| Doc Newton | 23 | 88.1 | 4 | 5 | 2.95 | 49 |
| Slow Joe Doyle | 12 | 48.0 | 1 | 1 | 2.63 | 20 |

==== Relief pitchers ====
Note: G = Games pitched; W = Wins; L = Losses; SV = Saves; ERA = Earned run average; SO = Strikeouts

| Player | G | W | L | SV | ERA | SO |
|---|---|---|---|---|---|---|
| Harry Billiard | 6 | 0 | 0 | 0 | 2.65 | 70 |
| Hippo Vaughn | 2 | 0 | 0 | 0 | 3.86 | 2 |
| Hal Chase | 1 | 0 | 0 | 0 | 0.00 | 0 |
