= 1908 Chicago White Sox season =

1908 Chicago White Sox
- League: American League
- Ballpark: South Side Park
- City: Chicago, Illinois
- Record: 88–64 (.579)
- League place: 3rd
- Owners: Charles Comiskey
- Managers: Fielder Jones

The 1908 season was the eighth in Chicago White Sox history and its eighth as a major league team. Owner Charles Comiskey optioned land in the summer of 1908 for what would become Comiskey Park. Despite ace pitcher Ed Walsh going an incredible 40–15 in 1908, the Sox could only muster a third-place finish in the American League standings, behind Detroit and Cleveland, ultimately finishing 88–64. The White Sox hit only three home runs for the entire season, the lowest total for a major league team in the modern era (since 1901).

== Regular season ==
=== Season standings ===
American League
Team	W	L	Pct.	GB	Home	Road
Detroit Tigers	90	63	.588	—	44‍–‍33	46‍–‍30
Cleveland Naps	90	64	.584	½	51‍–‍26	39‍–‍38
Chicago White Sox	88	64	.579	1½	51‍–‍25	37‍–‍39
St. Louis Browns	83	69	.546	6½	46‍–‍31	37‍–‍38
Boston Red Sox	75	79	.487	15½	37‍–‍40	38‍–‍39
Philadelphia Athletics	68	85	.444	22	46‍–‍30	22‍–‍55
Washington Senators	67	85	.441	22½	43‍–‍32	24‍–‍53
New York Highlanders	51	103	.331	39½	30‍–‍47	21‍–‍56

=== Record vs. opponents ===
1908 American League record Sources:
Team	BOS	CWS	CLE	DET	NYH	PHA	SLB	WSH
Boston	—	6–16–1	10–12	11–11	12–10	10–12	15–7	11–11
Chicago	16–6–1	—	8–14–1	9–13	16–6	13–9	11–10	15–6–2
Cleveland	12–10	14–8–1	—	13–9	16–6	16–6–1	11–11–1	8–14
Detroit	11–11	13–9	9–13	—	15–7	14–8–1	12–10	16–5
New York	10–12	6–16	6–16	7–15	—	8–14–1	5–17	9–13
Philadelphia	12–10	9–13	6–16–1	8–14–1	14–8–1	—	8–13–1	11–11
St. Louis	7–15	10–11	11–11–1	10–12	17–5	13–8–1	—	15–7–1
Washington	11–11	6–15–2	14–8	5–16	13–9	11–11	7–15–1	—

=== Roster ===
1908 Chicago White Sox
Roster
Pitchers: Nick Altrock; Lou Fiene; Moxie Manuel; Andy Nelson; Fred Olmstead; Frank Owen; Frank Smith; Ed Walsh; Doc White	Catchers: Ossee Schreckengost; Al Shaw; Billy Sullivan; Art Weaver; Infielders: Jake Atz; George Davis; Jiggs Donahue; Frank Isbell; Freddy Parent; Billy Purtell; Lee Tannehill	Outfielders: John Anderson; Patsy Dougherty; Ed Hahn; Fielder Jones	Manager: Fielder Jones

== Player stats ==
=== Batting ===
==== Starters by position ====
Note: Pos = Position; G = Games played; AB = At bats; H = Hits; Avg. = Batting average; HR = Home runs; RBI = Runs batted in

Pos	Player	G	AB	H	Avg.	HR	RBI
C	Billy Sullivan	137	430	82	.191	0	29
1B	Jiggs Donahue	93	304	62	.204	0	22
2B	George Davis	128	419	91	.217	0	26
SS	Freddy Parent	119	391	81	.207	0	35
3B	Lee Tannehill	141	482	104	.216	0	35
OF	Ed Hahn	122	447	112	.251	0	21
OF	Patsy Dougherty	138	482	134	.278	0	45
OF	Fielder Jones	149	529	134	.253	1	50

==== Other batters ====
Note: G = Games played; AB = At bats; H = Hits; Avg. = Batting average; HR = Home runs; RBI = Runs batted in

Player	G	AB	H	Avg.	HR	RBI
John Anderson	123	355	93	.262	0	47
Frank Isbell	84	320	79	.247	1	49
Jake Atz	83	206	40	.194	0	27
Billy Purtell	26	69	9	.130	0	3
Al Shaw	32	49	4	.082	0	2
Art Weaver	15	35	7	.200	0	1
Ossee Schreckengost	6	16	3	.188	0	0

=== Pitching ===
==== Starting pitchers ====
Note: G = Games pitched; IP = Innings pitched; W = Wins; L = Losses; ERA = Earned run average; SO = Strikeouts

Player	G	IP	W	L	ERA	SO
Ed Walsh	66	464.0	40	15	1.42	269
Frank Smith	41	297.2	16	17	2.03	129
Doc White	41	296.0	18	13	2.55	126
Lou Fiene	1	9.0	0	1	4.00	3

==== Other pitchers ====
Note: G = Games pitched; IP = Innings pitched; W = Wins; L = Losses; ERA = Earned run average; SO = Strikeouts

Player	G	IP	W	L	ERA	SO
Frank Owen	25	140.0	6	7	3.41	48
Nick Altrock	23	136.0	5	7	2.71	21
Moxie Manuel	18	60.1	3	4	3.28	25
Andy Nelson	2	9.0	0	0	2.00	1

==== Relief pitchers ====
Note: G = Games pitched; W = Wins; L = Losses; SV = Saves; ERA = Earned run average; SO = Strikeouts

Player	G	W	L	SV	ERA	SO
Fred Olmstead	1	0	0	0	13.50	1
