= Cy Falkenberg =

American baseball player (1879–1961)

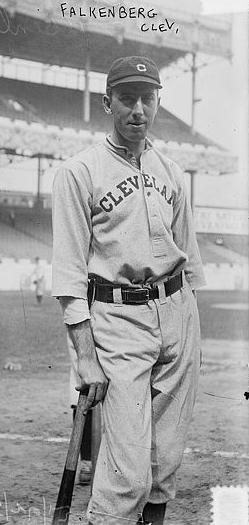
- Falkenberg in 1913
- Pitcher
- Born: December 17, 1879; Chicago, Illinois, U.S.
- Died: April 15, 1961 (aged 81); San Francisco, California, U.S.
- Batted: Right Threw: Right

MLB debut
- April 21, 1903, for the Pittsburgh Pirates

Last MLB appearance
- July 4, 1917, for the Philadelphia Athletics

MLB statistics
- Win–loss record: 130–123
- Earned run average: 2.68
- Strikeouts: 1,164
- Stats at Baseball Reference

Teams
- Pittsburgh Pirates (1903); Washington Senators (1905–1908); Cleveland Naps (1908–1911, 1913); Indianapolis Hoosiers (1914); Newark Peppers (1915); Brooklyn Tip-Tops (1915); Philadelphia Athletics (1917)

Frederick Peter "Cy" Falkenberg (December 17, 1879 – April 15, 1961) was an American professional baseball pitcher. He played in Major League Baseball (MLB) from 1903 to 1917 for the Pittsburgh Pirates of the National League, the Washington Senators, Cleveland Naps, and Philadelphia Athletics of the American League and the Indianapolis Hoosiers, Newark Peppers, and Brooklyn Tip-Tops of the Federal League.

== Early life ==
Frederick Peter Falkenberg was born on December 17, 1879, in Chicago, Illinois. He was the first of seven children born to Agnes and Frederick A. Falkenberg, who had both immigrated to the United States from Norway. Falkenberg attended Northwest Division High School in Chicago, and played for the school's baseball team. He also played as a semi-professional in Chicago.

== Baseball career ==
Falkenberg attended the University of Illinois Urbana-Champaign, where he played college baseball for the Illinois Fighting Illini, coached by George Huff. His teammates included Jake Stahl and Carl Lundgren. Falkenberg graduated from the university in 1902. That year, the Worcester Hustlers attempted to sign Lundgren, but he signed with the Chicago Cubs of the National League. Worcester signed Falkenberg instead. He won 18 games for Worcester that season.

After the 1902 season, the Pittsburgh Pirates of the National League purchased Falkenberg from Worcester. He made his major league debut with the Pirates on April 21, 1903. Manager Fred Clarke allowed Falkenberg to make hs first start against the Cubs in Chicago. He was briefly sent back to Worcester, but was recalled at the end of July, when the Pirates released Ed Doheny. Falkenberg struggled in his first year in the majors, losing five of six decisions. He was released by Pittsburgh at the end of August.

Falkenberg was reserved for the 1904 season by the Toronto Maple Leafs of the Eastern League, and though he initially indicated that he would not sign with Toronto, he returned his signed contract and pitched for Toronto in 1904 and 1905. When Huff was hospitalized in 1905, Stahl and Falkenberg coached the Fighting Illini baseball team. That year, he began to experiment with different ways to get break on his spitball, which he called the "pinch ball". He signed with the Harrisburg Senators of the Tri-State League, and Harrisburg reserved him for the 1906 season.

In 1905, the Washington Senators of the American League purchased Falkenberg from Toronto. Stahl was the Senators' manager at the time. In 1906, the Washington newspapers began to refer to Falkenberg as "Cy". That year, he walked 108 batters and threw 14 wild pitches, the most in the American League. Stahl was replaced as manager with Joe Cantillon in 1907, and newspapers reported during the season that Cantillon wanted to part with Falkenberg. However, Cantillon opted to keep Falkenberg during the 1907–08 offseason.

In September 1907, the National Commission ruled that Falkenberg owed the Harrisburg club a refund on a $200 signing bonus ($6,911 in current dollar terms) that he received from them because he joined Washington instead. When he did not promptly repay the debt, he was suspended by Ban Johnson in May 1908 until he repaid it, which he did a few weeks later. Falkenberg continued to pitch inconsistently for Washington, and his name resurfaced in trade rumors later in the season.

On July 23, 1908, the Cleveland Naps of the American League purchased Falkenberg and Dave Altizer from the Senators for $10,000 ($358,333 in current dollar terms). He continued to pitch for Cleveland through 1911. He missed time during the 1911 season due to illness and a broken thumb. After the 1911 season, Harry Davis became Cleveland's manager, and he released Falkenberg to the Toledo Mud Hens of the American Association. With Toledo in 1912, Falkenberg played with Earle Gardner, who had learned how to throw the emery ball from Russ Ford. Gardner taught the pitch to Falkenberg. Falkenberg had a 25–8 win–loss record in 1912, leading the American Association with a .758 winning percentage. Cleveland purchased Falkenberg from Toledo before the 1913 season. He won his first 10 games of the season, and finished the year with a 23–10 win–loss record and a 2.22 ERA, the second-most wins and eighth-best ERA in the American League. He led the American League with 13 wild pitches in 1913.

Before the 1914 season, Falkenberg jumped from Cleveland to the Indianapolis Hoosiers of the outlaw Federal League. He signed a three-year contract worth $10,000 per season ($321,429 in current dollar terms). In 1914, using the emery ball, Falkenberg led the Federal League with 43 games started, 377 1/3 innings pitched, and 236 strikeouts. He also had the third-most wins (25) and the fourth-best ERA (2.22). The Hoosiers moved to Newark, New Jersey, before the 1915 season, becoming the Newark Peppers. The emery ball was discovered during the 1914 season, and was outlawed. Without the emery ball, Falkenberg struggled in 1915, pitching to a 9–11 win–loss record for Newark. The Peppers traded him to the Brooklyn Tip-Tops for Tom Seaton in August. Frank LaPorte was also included in the trade, but he was not to report to Brooklyn until after the 1915 season. Falkenberg had a 3–3 win–loss record for Brooklyn after the trade.

The Federal League collapsed after the 1915 season, and major league teams did not want to purchase Falkenberg's sizeable contract. He signed with the Indianapolis Indians of the American Association for the 1916 season and re-signed with them for the 1917 season. After pitching well in an exhibition game against the Philadelphia Athletics of the American League, the Athletics acquired Falkenberg for Jack Nabors on April 29. However, Falkenberg struggled with Philadelphia, pitching to a 2–6 win–loss record, and was sold back to Indianapolis on July 5.

Falkenberg returned to Indianapolis in 1918, but announced that he would not return to the American Association in 1919. Indianapolis sold his contract to the Seattle Rainiers of the Pacific Coast League (PCL). During the season, Seattle traded Falkenberg to the Oakland Oaks of the PCL for Lynn Brenton. On August 19, Falkenberg threw a no-hitter against Seattle. After the 1919 season, Falkenberg announced that he was retiring from professional baseball.

== Personal life ==
Falkenberg married Edna Russell, a telephone operator who he met in Washington, D.C., after the 1908 season. They had two children.

Falkenberg enjoyed ten-pin bowling. He competed in tournaments hosted by the American Bowling Congress and managed bowling alleys. He averaged about 200 pins per game. After playing baseball in the PCL, Falkenberg moved his family to San Francisco, California, and managed bowling alleys in the San Francisco Bay Area. During World War II, Falkenberg worked in the tool room for the Bethlehem Shipbuilding Corporation.

Falkenberg died in San Francisco on April 15, 1961. He was buried in Holy Cross Cemetery in Colma, California.

== See also ==
- List of Major League Baseball annual shutout leaders
- List of Major League Baseball annual strikeout leaders
- List of Major League Baseball career ERA leaders
