= Jake Thielman =

American baseball player (1879–1928)

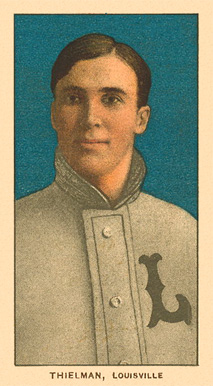
- Pitcher
- Born: May 20, 1879; St. Cloud, Minnesota, U.S.
- Died: January 28, 1928 (aged 48); Minneapolis, Minnesota, U.S.
- Batted: Right Threw: Right

MLB debut
- April 19, 1905, for the St. Louis Cardinals

Last MLB appearance
- August 9, 1908, for the Boston Red Sox

MLB statistics
- Win–loss record: 30–28
- Earned run average: 3.16
- Strikeouts: 158
- Stats at Baseball Reference

Teams
- St. Louis Cardinals (1905–1906); Cleveland Naps (1907–1908); Boston Red Sox (1908)

John Peter Thielman (May 20, 1879 – January 28, 1928) was a German-American pitcher in Major League Baseball who played from 1905 through 1908 for the St. Louis Cardinals (1905–1906), Cleveland Naps (1907–1908) and Boston Red Sox (1908). Listed at 5 ft 11 in (1.80 m), 175 pounds (79 kg), Thielman batted and threw right-handed. He was born in St. Cloud, Minnesota. His younger brother, Henry Thielman, also pitched in the majors.

In a four-season career, Thielman posted a 30–28 record with 158 strikeouts and a 3.16 ERA in 65 appearances, including 56 starts, 56 complete games, three shutouts, and 475⅓ innings of work.

Thielman died at the age of 48 in Minneapolis, Minnesota.

== Best seasons ==
- 1905 – 15 wins, 87 SO, 3.50 ERA, 242.0 innings
- 1907 – 11 wins, 56 SO, 2.33 ERA, 166.0 innings
