= 1908 St. Louis Browns season =

Major League Baseball season

1908 St. Louis Browns
- League: American League
- Ballpark: Sportsman's Park
- City: St. Louis, Missouri
- Record: 83–69 (.546)
- League place: 4th
- Owners: Robert Hedges
- Managers: Jimmy McAleer

The 1908 St. Louis Browns season was a season in American baseball. It involved the Browns finishing 4th in the American League with a record of 83 wins and 69 losses.

== Offseason ==
- October 5, 1907: Ollie Pickering was traded by the Browns to the Washington Senators for Charlie Jones.

== Regular season ==
- In April 1908, the Browns played the St. Louis Cardinals in an exhibition game to raise money for former Cardinals owner Chris von der Ahe. The clubs raised $4,300.

=== Season standings ===
American League
Team	W	L	Pct.	GB	Home	Road
Detroit Tigers	90	63	.588	—	44‍–‍33	46‍–‍30
Cleveland Naps	90	64	.584	½	51‍–‍26	39‍–‍38
Chicago White Sox	88	64	.579	1½	51‍–‍25	37‍–‍39
St. Louis Browns	83	69	.546	6½	46‍–‍31	37‍–‍38
Boston Red Sox	75	79	.487	15½	37‍–‍40	38‍–‍39
Philadelphia Athletics	68	85	.444	22	46‍–‍30	22‍–‍55
Washington Senators	67	85	.441	22½	43‍–‍32	24‍–‍53
New York Highlanders	51	103	.331	39½	30‍–‍47	21‍–‍56

=== Record vs. opponents ===
1908 American League record Sources:
Team	BOS	CWS	CLE	DET	NYH	PHA	SLB	WSH
Boston	—	6–16–1	10–12	11–11	12–10	10–12	15–7	11–11
Chicago	16–6–1	—	8–14–1	9–13	16–6	13–9	11–10	15–6–2
Cleveland	12–10	14–8–1	—	13–9	16–6	16–6–1	11–11–1	8–14
Detroit	11–11	13–9	9–13	—	15–7	14–8–1	12–10	16–5
New York	10–12	6–16	6–16	7–15	—	8–14–1	5–17	9–13
Philadelphia	12–10	9–13	6–16–1	8–14–1	14–8–1	—	8–13–1	11–11
St. Louis	7–15	10–11	11–11–1	10–12	17–5	13–8–1	—	15–7–1
Washington	11–11	6–15–2	14–8	5–16	13–9	11–11	7–15–1	—

=== Roster ===
1908 St. Louis Browns
Roster
Pitchers: Bill Bailey; Bill Dinneen; Bill Grahame; Harry Howell; Barney Pelty; Jack Powell; Rube Waddell	Catchers: Bert Blue; Syd Smith; Tubby Spencer; Jim Stephens; Infielders: Hobe Ferris; Tom Jones; Bobby Wallace; Jimmy Williams; Joe Yeager	Outfielders: Dode Criss; Roy Hartzell; Emmet Heidrick; Danny Hoffman; Charlie Jones; Al Schweitzer; George Stone	Manager: Jimmy McAleer

== Player stats ==
=== Batting ===
==== Starters by position ====
Note: Pos = Position; G = Games played; AB = At bats; H = Hits; Avg. = Batting average; HR = Home runs; RBI = Runs batted in

Pos	Player	G	AB	H	Avg.	HR	RBI
C	Tubby Spencer	91	286	60	.210	0	28
1B	Tom Jones	155	549	135	.246	1	50
2B	Jimmy Williams	148	539	127	.236	4	53
SS	Bobby Wallace	137	487	123	.253	1	60
3B	Hobe Ferris	148	555	150	.270	2	74
OF	Roy Hartzell	115	422	112	.265	2	32
OF	George Stone	148	588	165	.281	5	31
OF	Danny Hoffman	99	363	91	.251	1	25

==== Other batters ====
Note: G = Games played; AB = At bats; H = Hits; Avg. = Batting average; HR = Home runs; RBI = Runs batted in

Player	G	AB	H	Avg.	HR	RBI
Charlie Jones	74	263	61	.232	0	17
Al Schweitzer	64	182	53	.291	1	14
Jim Stephens	47	150	30	.200	0	6
Emmet Heidrick	26	93	20	.215	1	6
Dode Criss	64	82	28	.341	0	14
Syd Smith	27	76	14	.184	0	5
Bert Blue	11	24	9	.375	0	1
Joe Yeager	10	15	5	.333	0	1

=== Pitching ===
==== Starting pitchers ====
Note: G = Games pitched; IP = Innings pitched; W = Wins; L = Losses; ERA = Earned run average; SO = Strikeouts

Player	G	IP	W	L	ERA	SO
Harry Howell	41	324.1	18	18	1.89	117
Rube Waddell	43	285.2	19	14	1.89	232
Jack Powell	33	256.0	16	13	2.11	85

==== Other pitchers ====
Note: G = Games pitched; IP = Innings pitched; W = Wins; L = Losses; ERA = Earned run average; SO = Strikeouts

Player	G	IP	W	L	ERA	SO
Bill Dinneen	27	167.0	14	7	2.10	39
Barney Pelty	20	122.0	7	4	1.99	36
Bill Grahame	21	117.1	6	7	2.30	47
Bill Bailey	22	106.2	3	5	3.04	42

==== Relief pitchers ====
Note: G = Games pitched; W = Wins; L = Losses; SV = Saves; ERA = Earned run average; SO = Strikeouts

Player	G	W	L	SV	ERA	SO
Dode Criss	9	0	1	0	6.50	9
