= Clay Perry (baseball) =

American baseball player (1881–1954)

- Third baseman
- Born: December 18, 1881; Rice Lake, Wisconsin, US
- Died: January 16, 1954 (aged 72); Rice Lake, Wisconsin, US
- Batted: Right Threw: Right

MLB debut
- September 2, 1908, for the Detroit Tigers

Last MLB appearance
- September 13, 1908, for the Detroit Tigers

MLB statistics
- Batting average: .118
- Hits: 2
- Runs batted in: 0
- Stats at Baseball Reference

Teams
- Detroit Tigers (1908)

Clayton Shields Perry (December 18, 1881 – January 13, 1954) was an American baseball player who played principally as a second baseman and third baseman. He played professional baseball for 14 years from 1905 to 1918, including seven games in Major League Baseball with the Detroit Tigers in 1908.

== Early years ==
Perry was born in 1881 in Rice Lake, Wisconsin. He attended the University of Wisconsin. He was a member of Wisconsin's Class of 1907 and played baseball for the Wisconsin Badgers baseball team.

== Professional baseball player ==
Perry appeared in seven games for the Detroit Tigers in 1908. He played third base and had two hits in 17 at bats for a .118 batting average. He was acquired by Detroit to fill in during an injury to the team's regular third baseman Bill Coughlin.

Perry also played minor league baseball from 1905 to 1918, including stints with the Oskaloosa Quakers (1905), Montgomery Senators (1906–1908), Little Rock Travelers (1909), Chattanooga Lookouts (1910–1911), Nashville Volunteers (1911-1913), Mobile Gulls (1914–1915), Beaumont Oilers (1916–1917), and San Antonio Bronchos (1917–1918).

== Later years ==
Perry was married to Hilda Bjoin Perry. He died in 1954 at Rice Lake, Wisconsin. He was buried at Nora Cemetery in that city.
