= Hank Gehring =

American baseball player (1881-1912)

- Pitcher
- Born: January 24, 1881; St. Paul, Minnesota, U.S.
- Died: April 18, 1912 (aged 31); Kansas City, Missouri, U.S.
- Batted: Right Threw: Right

MLB debut
- July 16, 1907, for the Washington Senators

Last MLB appearance
- May 13, 1908, for the Washington Senators

MLB statistics
- Win–loss record: 3–8
- Earned run average: 3.91
- Strikeouts: 31
- Stats at Baseball Reference

Teams
- Washington Senators (1907–1908)

Henry Gehring (January 24, 1881 – April 18, 1912) was an American pitcher in Major League Baseball. He played for the Washington Senators in 1907 and 1908.
