= Bill Lattimore =

American baseball player (1884-1919)

- Pitcher
- Born: May 25, 1884; Roxton, Texas
- Died: October 30, 1919 (aged 35); Colorado Springs, Colorado
- Batted: Left Threw: Left

MLB debut
- April 17, 1908, for the Cleveland Naps

Last MLB appearance
- May 28, 1908, for the Cleveland Naps

MLB statistics
- Win–loss record: 1–2
- Earned run average: 4.50
- Strikeouts: 5
- Stats at Baseball Reference

Teams
- Cleveland Naps (1908)

William Hershel Lattimore (May 25, 1884 – October 30, 1919), nicknamed "Slothful Bill", was a Major League Baseball pitcher who played for one season. He pitched in four games for the Cleveland Naps during the 1908 Cleveland Naps season.
