= 1908 Detroit Tigers season =

Major League Baseball season

1908 Detroit Tigers
- American League champions
- League: American League
- Ballpark: Bennett Park
- City: Detroit, Michigan
- Record: 90–63 (.588)
- League place: 1st
- Owners: William H. Yawkey and Frank Navin
- Managers: Hughie Jennings

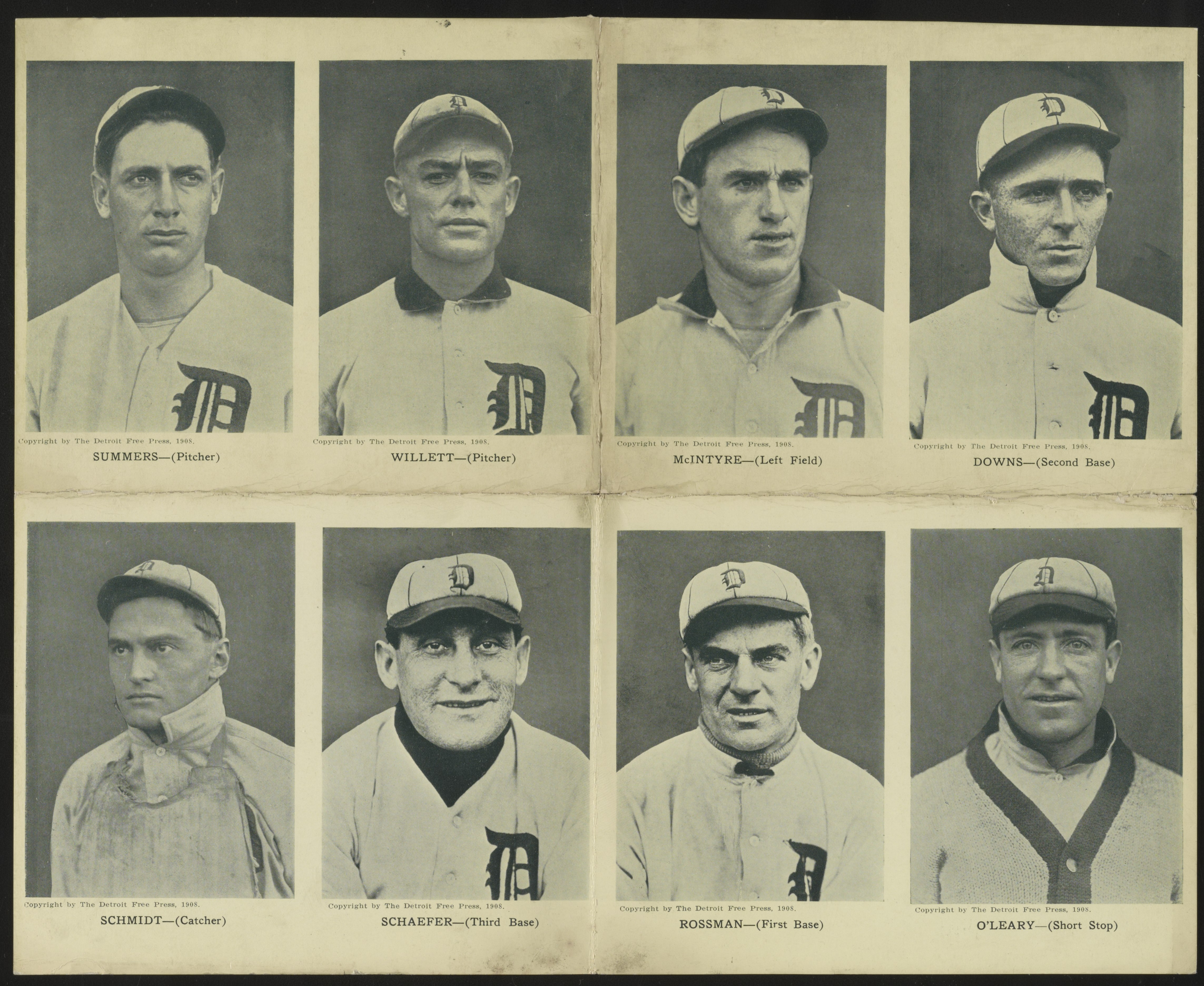
Some members of the team, shown on baseball cards. Sheet of eight postcards featuring Detroit baseball players: Summers (Pitcher); Willett (Pitcher). McIntyre (Left Field); Downs (Second Base); Schmidt (Catcher); Schaefer (Third Base); Rossman (First Base) and O'Leary (Short Stop).

The 1908 Detroit Tigers season was a season in American baseball. The team won the American League championship by means of a scheduling quirk, finishing just one-half game ahead of the Cleveland Naps. The two teams won the same number of games, but the Tigers completed and lost one fewer. They then lost to the Chicago Cubs in the 1908 World Series.

== Regular season ==
The early part of the season was defined in part by Ty Cobb's contract dispute with the team. He claimed that the owners had too much power. Eventually Cobb settled for a $4,800 contract. After opening day, the Tigers averaged only 4,400 fans per game.

=== Season standings ===
American League
Team	W	L	Pct.	GB	Home	Road
Detroit Tigers	90	63	.588	—	44‍–‍33	46‍–‍30
Cleveland Naps	90	64	.584	½	51‍–‍26	39‍–‍38
Chicago White Sox	88	64	.579	1½	51‍–‍25	37‍–‍39
St. Louis Browns	83	69	.546	6½	46‍–‍31	37‍–‍38
Boston Red Sox	75	79	.487	15½	37‍–‍40	38‍–‍39
Philadelphia Athletics	68	85	.444	22	46‍–‍30	22‍–‍55
Washington Senators	67	85	.441	22½	43‍–‍32	24‍–‍53
New York Highlanders	51	103	.331	39½	30‍–‍47	21‍–‍56

=== Record vs. opponents ===
1908 American League record Sources:
Team	BOS	CWS	CLE	DET	NYH	PHA	SLB	WSH
Boston	—	6–16–1	10–12	11–11	12–10	10–12	15–7	11–11
Chicago	16–6–1	—	8–14–1	9–13	16–6	13–9	11–10	15–6–2
Cleveland	12–10	14–8–1	—	13–9	16–6	16–6–1	11–11–1	8–14
Detroit	11–11	13–9	9–13	—	15–7	14–8–1	12–10	16–5
New York	10–12	6–16	6–16	7–15	—	8–14–1	5–17	9–13
Philadelphia	12–10	9–13	6–16–1	8–14–1	14–8–1	—	8–13–1	11–11
St. Louis	7–15	10–11	11–11–1	10–12	17–5	13–8–1	—	15–7–1
Washington	11–11	6–15–2	14–8	5–16	13–9	11–11	7–15–1	—

=== Roster ===
1908 Detroit Tigers
Roster
Pitchers: Bill Donovan; Ed Killian; Herm Malloy; George Mullin; Ed Siever; George Suggs; Ed Summers; Ed Willett; George Winter	Catchers: Fred Payne; Boss Schmidt; Ira Thomas; Infielders: Donie Bush; Bill Coughlin; Red Downs; Red Killefer; Charley O'Leary; Clay Perry; Claude Rossman; Germany Schaefer	Outfielders: Ty Cobb; Sam Crawford; Davy Jones; Matty McIntyre	Manager: Hughie Jennings

== Player stats ==
=== Batting ===
==== Starters by position ====
Note: Pos = Position; G = Games played; AB = At bats; H = Hits; Avg. = Batting average; HR = Home runs; RBI = Runs batted in

Pos	Player	G	AB	H	Avg.	HR	RBI
C	Boss Schmidt	122	419	111	.265	1	38
1B	Claude Rossman	138	524	154	.294	2	71
2B	Red Downs	84	289	64	.221	1	35
SS	Germany Schaefer	153	584	151	.259	3	52
3B	Bill Coughlin	119	405	87	.215	0	23
OF	Sam Crawford	152	591	184	.311	7	80
OF	Matty McIntyre	151	569	168	.295	0	28
OF	Ty Cobb	150	581	188	.324	4	108

==== Other batters ====
Note: G = Games played; AB = At bats; H = Hits; Avg. = Batting average; HR = Home runs; RBI = Runs batted in

Player	G	AB	H	Avg.	HR	RBI
Charley O'Leary	65	211	53	.251	0	17
Davy Jones	56	121	25	.207	0	10
Ira Thomas	40	101	31	.307	0	10
Red Killefer	28	75	16	.213	0	11
Donie Bush	20	68	20	.290	0	4
Fred Payne	20	45	3	.067	0	2
Clay Perry	7	17	2	.118	0	0

=== Pitching ===
==== Starting pitchers ====
Note: G = Games pitched; IP = Innings pitched; W = Wins; L = Losses; ERA = Earned run average; SO = Strikeouts

Player	G	IP	W	L	ERA	SO
Ed Summers	40	301.0	24	12	1.64	103
George Mullin	39	290.2	17	13	3.10	121
Bill Donovan	29	242.2	18	7	2.08	141
Ed Willett	30	197.1	15	8	2.28	77
Ed Killian	27	180.2	12	9	2.99	47
Ed Siever	11	61.2	2	6	3.50	23
George Winter	7	56.1	1	5	1.60	25

==== Other pitchers ====
Note: G = Games pitched; IP = Innings pitched; W = Wins; L = Losses; ERA = Earned run average; SO = Strikeouts

Player	G	IP	W	L	ERA	SO
George Suggs	6	27.0	1	1	1.67	8
Herm Malloy	3	17.0	0	2	3.71	8

== 1908 World Series ==
=== Game 1 ===
October 10, 1908, at Bennett Park in Detroit, Michigan

Team	1	2	3	4	5	6	7	8	9	R	H	E
Chicago (NL)	0	0	4	0	0	0	1	0	5	10	14	2
Detroit (AL)	1	0	0	0	0	0	3	2	0	6	10	3
W: Mordecai Brown (1–0) L: Ed Summers (0–1)

=== Game 2 ===
October 11, 1908, at West Side Park in Chicago, Illinois

Team	1	2	3	4	5	6	7	8	9	R	H	E
Detroit (AL)	0	0	0	0	0	0	0	0	1	1	4	1
Chicago (NL)	0	0	0	0	0	0	0	6	x	6	7	0
W: Orval Overall (1–0) L: Bill Donovan (0–1)
HR: CHC – Joe Tinker (1)

=== Game 3 ===
October 12, 1908, at West Side Park in Chicago, Illinois

Team	1	2	3	4	5	6	7	8	9	R	H	E
Detroit (AL)	1	0	0	0	0	5	0	2	0	8	12	4
Chicago (NL)	0	0	0	3	0	0	0	0	0	3	7	0
W: George Mullin (1–0) L: Jack Pfiester (0–1)

=== Game 4 ===
October 13, 1908, at Bennett Park in Detroit, Michigan

Team	1	2	3	4	5	6	7	8	9	R	H	E
Chicago (NL)	0	0	2	0	0	0	0	0	1	3	10	0
Detroit (AL)	0	0	0	0	0	0	0	0	0	0	4	1
W: Mordecai Brown (2–0) L: Ed Summers (0–2)

=== Game 5 ===
October 14, 1908, at Bennett Park in Detroit, Michigan

Team	1	2	3	4	5	6	7	8	9	R	H	E
Chicago (NL)	1	0	0	0	1	0	0	0	0	2	10	0
Detroit	0	0	0	0	0	0	0	0	0	0	3	0
W: Orval Overall (2–0) L: Bill Donovan (0–2)
