= Pete Wilson (baseball) =

American baseball player (1885-1957)

- Pitcher
- Born: October 9, 1885; Springfield, Massachusetts, U.S.
- Died: June 5, 1957 (aged 71); St. Petersburg, Florida, U.S.
- Batted: Unknown Threw: Left

MLB debut
- September 15, 1908, for the New York Highlanders

Last MLB appearance
- October 2, 1909, for the New York Highlanders

MLB statistics
- Win–loss record: 9-8
- Earned run average: 3.26
- Strikeouts: 72
- Stats at Baseball Reference

Teams
- New York Highlanders (1908–1909)

Peter Alex Wilson (October 9, 1885 – June 5, 1957) was an American professional baseball pitcher. Wilson played in Major League Baseball for the New York Highlanders in 1908 and 1909. In 20 career games, he had a 9–8 record with a 3.26 ERA. He threw left-handed.

Wilson was born in Springfield, Massachusetts, and died in St. Petersburg, Florida.
