= Ed Foster (baseball) =

American baseball player (1885-1929)

- Pitcher
- Born: June 25, 1885; Lebanon, Tennessee, U.S.
- Died: March 1, 1929 (aged 43); Montgomery, Alabama, U.S.
- Batted: Right Threw: Right

MLB debut
- July 31, 1908, for the Cleveland Naps

Last MLB appearance
- October 5, 1908, for the Cleveland Naps

MLB statistics
- Win–loss record: 1–0
- Earned run average: 2.14
- Strikeouts: 11
- Stats at Baseball Reference

Teams
- Cleveland Naps (1908)

Edward Lee Foster (June 25, 1885 – March 1, 1929), nicknamed "Slim", was an American Major League Baseball pitcher who played for one season. He pitched in six games for the Cleveland Naps during the 1908 Cleveland Naps season, starting one game and finishing five.
