= Gus Salve =

American baseball player (1885-1971)

- Pitcher
- Born: December 29, 1885; Boston, Massachusetts, U.S.
- Died: March 29, 1971 (aged 85); Providence, Rhode Island, U.S.
- Batted: Left Threw: Left

MLB debut
- September 4, 1908, for the Philadelphia Athletics

Last MLB appearance
- September 14, 1908, for the Philadelphia Athletics

MLB statistics
- Win–loss record: 0–1
- Earned run average: 4.11
- Strikeouts: 6
- Stats at Baseball Reference

Teams
- Philadelphia Athletics (1908)

Augustus William Salve (December 29, 1885 – March 29, 1971) was an American Major League Baseball pitcher. He appeared in two games for the Philadelphia Athletics during the 1908 season, once as a starter and once in relief.
