= Jack Flater =

American baseball player (1883-1970)

- Pitcher
- Born: September 22, 1883; Sandymount, Maryland, U.S.
- Died: March 20, 1970 (aged 86); Westminster, Maryland, U.S.
- Batted: Right Threw: Right

MLB debut
- September 18, 1908, for the Philadelphia Athletics

Last MLB appearance
- October 3, 1908, for the Philadelphia Athletics

MLB statistics
- Win–loss record: 1–3
- Earned run average: 2.06
- Strikeouts: 8
- Stats at Baseball Reference

Teams
- Philadelphia Athletics (1908)

John William Flater (September 22, 1883 – March 20, 1970) was a Major League Baseball pitcher for the Philadelphia Athletics just at the end of the 1908 season (September 18 – October 3). The 5 ft 10 in (1.78 m), 175 lb. right-hander was a native of Sandymount, Maryland.

Flater pitched in five games for the Athletics. He hurled complete games in all three of his starting assignments, and he finished two other games in relief. He pitched much better than his 1–3 record would indicate. In 39.1 innings he allowed only 49 baserunners (35 hits, 12 walks, and 2 hit batsmen), and just 9 of the 15 runs that scored against him were earned runs. His ERA was an excellent 2.06. He was pitching for a team, however, that won 68 games, lost 85, and made 272 errors, including 3 by Flater himself. The games he lost were by scores of 2–1, 3–2, and 5–4.

Four of his famous teammates on the Athletics were future Hall of Famers Chief Bender, Eddie Collins, Jimmy Collins, and Eddie Plank.

Flater died at the age of 87 in Westminster, Maryland, and is buried in nearby Sandymount, Maryland.
