= Al Kellogg =

American baseball player (1886-1953)

- Pitcher
- Born: September 9, 1886; Providence, Rhode Island, U.S.
- Died: July 21, 1953 (aged 66); Portland, Oregon, U.S.
- Batted: Unknown Threw: Left

MLB debut
- September 25, 1908, for the Philadelphia Athletics

Last MLB appearance
- October 3, 1908, for the Philadelphia Athletics

MLB statistics
- Win–loss record: 0-2
- Earned run average: 5.82
- Strikeouts: 8
- Stats at Baseball Reference

Teams
- Philadelphia Athletics (1908)

Albert Clement Kellogg (September 9, 1886 – July 21, 1953) was an American Major League Baseball pitcher. He played for the Philadelphia Athletics during the 1908 season.
