= Kid Elberfeld =

American baseball player (1875–1944)

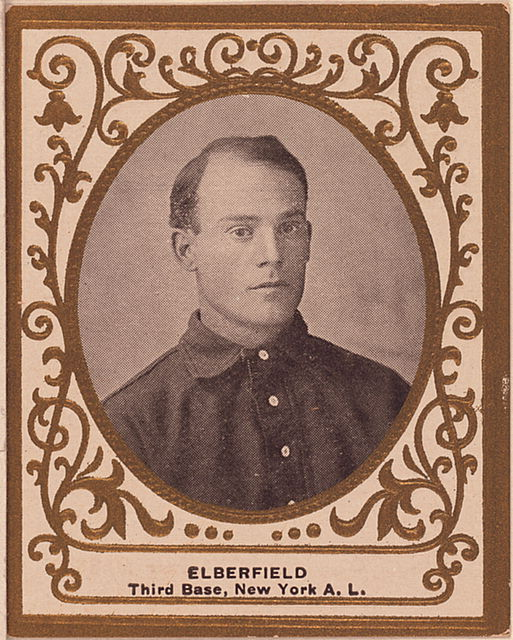
- Shortstop
- Born: April 13, 1875; Pomeroy, Ohio, U.S.
- Died: January 13, 1944 (aged 68); Chattanooga, Tennessee, U.S.
- Batted: Right Threw: Right

MLB debut
- May 30, 1898, for the Philadelphia Phillies

Last MLB appearance
- September 24, 1914, for the Brooklyn Robins

MLB statistics
- Batting average: .271
- Home runs: 10
- Runs batted in: 535
- Stats at Baseball Reference

Teams
- As player: Philadelphia Phillies (1898); Cincinnati Reds (1899); Detroit Tigers (1901–1903); New York Highlanders (1903–1909); Washington Senators (1910–1911); Brooklyn Robins (1914); As manager: New York Highlanders (1908)

Norman Arthur "Kid" Elberfeld (April 13, 1875 – January 13, 1944) was an American professional baseball shortstop. He played in Major League Baseball (MLB) for the Philadelphia Phillies (1898), Cincinnati Reds (1899), Detroit Tigers (1901–1903), New York Highlanders (1903–1909), Washington Senators (1910–1911), and Brooklyn Robins (1914). Elberfled also managed the New York Highlanders for the last half of the 1908 season.

Elberfeld was given the nickname "the Tabasco Kid" because of his fiery temper. He was known for his ferocious verbal, and sometimes physical, assaults on umpires. On one occasion, while in the minors, Elberfeld threw a lump of mud into the umpire's open mouth. Later in his career, Elberfeld assaulted umpire Silk O'Loughlin and had to be forcibly removed by police; Elberfeld was suspended for just 8 games. He was ejected from a major league game 22 times as a player and 4 times as a manager.

== Early career ==
Elberfeld broke into organized baseball in 1892 in Clarkson, Tennessee. He was so highly regarded as a prospect that a scout for the Philadelphia Phillies recommended signing him over another shortstop prospect, future Hall of Famer Honus Wagner. Elberfeld played only 14 games for the Phillies in 1898 before being sent to the Detroit Tigers, then a minor league team in the Western Conference. A year later, Elberfeld was purchased from Detroit by the Cincinnati Reds. Elberfeld lasted only 41 games in Cincinnati.

== Detroit Tigers: 1899–1903 ==
During the 1899 season, the Reds sent Elberfeld back to Detroit, then still part of the Western League. In an August 1 home game against Grand Rapids (now the Cleveland Guardians), Elberfeld physically assaulted the umpire, for which he was fined $100 and suspended for the remainder of the season.

Elberfeld remained with Detroit when they joined the newly formed American League in 1901. He was the Tigers' starting shortstop during their first two seasons as a major league team. In the team's debut, on April 25, 1901, the Tigers committed seven errors, including three by Elberfeld. Later in the season, Elberfeld had 12 assists in a game on September 2, 1901. Elberfeld went on to bat .308 (with 76 runs batted in and a .397 on-base percentage) in the Tigers' inaugural season, becoming the Tigers' first team batting leader and first .300 hitter.

In 1902, Elberfeld's batting average dropped to .260, but he started the 1903 season on a hitting tear. In June 1903, with Elberfeld hitting .341, he was traded by the Tigers to the New York Highlanders for Herman Long and Ernie Courtney. Despite his hot hitting, Elberfeld had fallen out of favor in Detroit after being suspended for abusing an umpire. Tiger manager Ed Barrow accused Elberfeld of throwing games to get himself traded.

== New York Highlanders: 1903–1909 ==
Elberfeld was with the Highlanders from 1903 to 1909. During that time, he hit above .300 only once, batting .306 in 1906. Nevertheless, he was considered an integral part of the Highlanders teams, contributing in many small ways. For example, on May 20, 1907, Elberfeld stole home twice in the same game, the first American League player to accomplish that feat.

Elberfield became the second Yankees captain after Clark Griffith. He held the captaincy from 1906 through 1908. In late June 1908, Griffith resigned as manager, and Elberfeld replaced him. The Highlanders finished the 1908 season, Elberfeld's only season as a major league manager, in last place, with a 27–71 won-loss record (a .276 winning percentage) under Elberfeld.

== Washington Senators and Brooklyn Robins: 1910–1914 ==
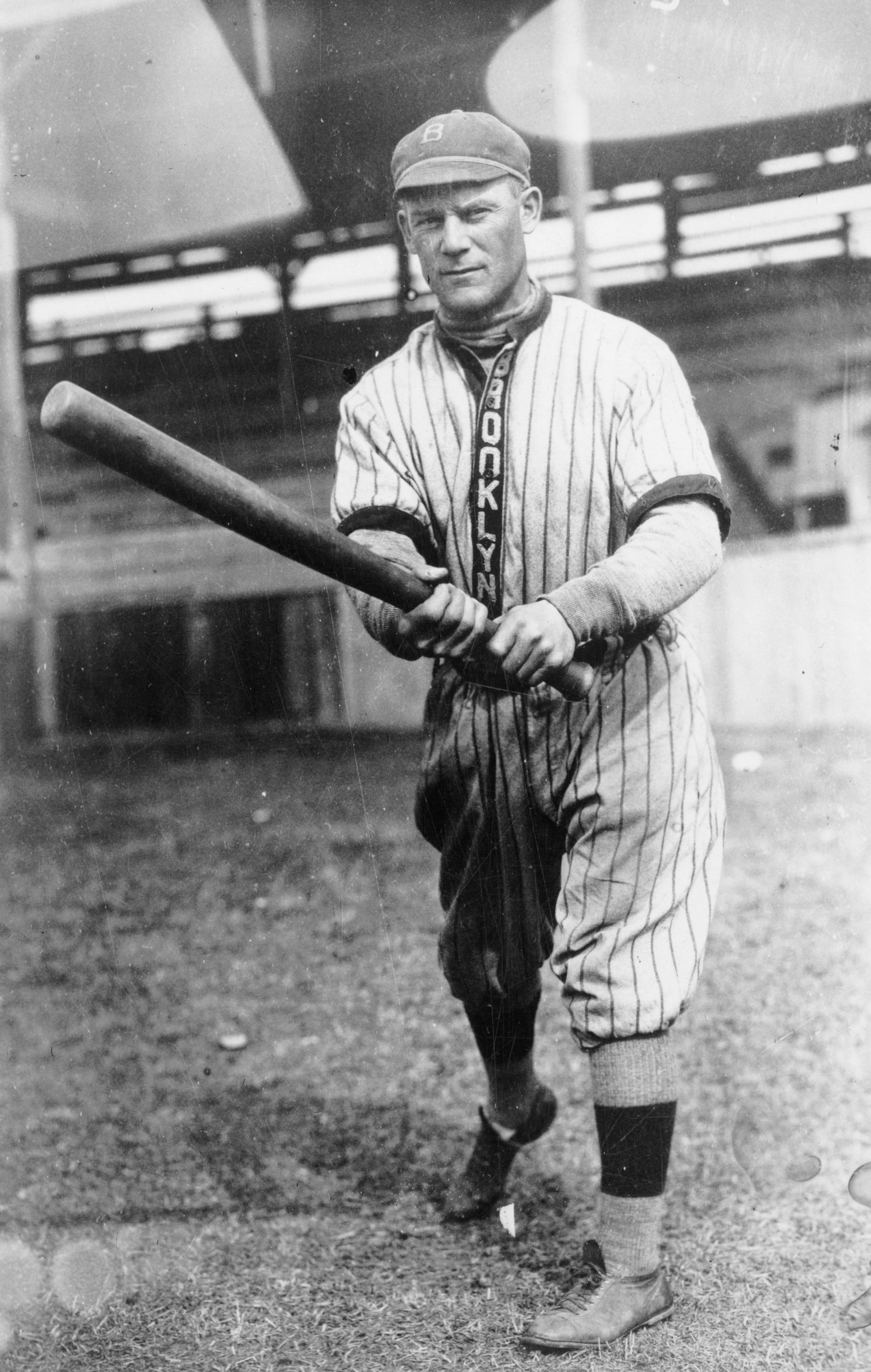
Elberfeld with Brooklyn.

In December 1909, Elberfeld was sold to the Washington Senators for $5,000 ($179,167 in today's dollar). He played two seasons for the Senators before being released. He signed with Montgomery in the Southern League, where he befriended a young Casey Stengel. According to Stengel biographer Maury Allen in his 1979 book, "You Could Look It Up: The Life of Casey Stengel", Elberfeld was generous with his time and his wisdom. The grizzled veteran and the 22-year-old youngster sat together on trains, roomed together in hotels, dined together in restaurants, shared thoughts on the bench and talked for hours about baseball. On September 15, 1912, Stengel was called up to Brooklyn. Elberfeld threw a farewell party for Stengel, ordering him to buy a new suit ("You gotta dress like a big leaguer before they believe you are one", Elberfeld said) for $22 and a new suitcase for $17.50. After a night of drinking, Elberfeld walked with Stengel to the train station and advised Stengel: "Keep your ears open and your mouth shut up there." Stengel went on to be known as much for his mouth as for his baseball talent.

Elberfeld returned briefly to the major leagues in 1914 with the Brooklyn Robins, batting .226 in 30 games.

== Player profile ==
Aside from his temper, Elberfeld became known as one of the best shortstops in the early years of the 20th century. He was known as a tough competitor who challenged baserunners to slash him out of their way. On May 1, 1908, Elberfeld was severely spiked in the foot by Bob Ganley‚ essentially ending his season. During Ty Cobb's rookie season, Cobb slid headfirst into second base, only to have Elberfeld dig his knee into the back of Cobb's neck, grinding his face in the dirt. According to a Cobb biographer, the incident marked the last time that Cobb slid headfirst into a base. Shortly before his death, Elberfeld was quoted as saying "Ty found out my feet were harder than his head. Then he started coming in spikes first. I had to protect myself." Elberfeld's legs were badly scarred from years of high-flying spikes, and it was reported that he poured raw whiskey into spike wounds to cauterize them.

Further showing his toughness, Elberfeld led the American League in times hit by pitches in 1903 and 1911, and was among the league leaders in the category nine times. In 1911, he was hit by pitches 25 times, setting an American League record that was not broken until 1986 when Don Baylor was hit 35 times. In his career, Elberfeld was hit 165 times, 19th on the all-time list, as of 2024.

Despite 458 errors at shortstop, Elberfeld had great range in his early years. In 1901, he made 332 putouts and had a range factor rating of 6.14 – 80 basis points higher than the league average for shortstops. He recorded a career-best 459 assists at shortstop the following season with the Tigers. Elberfeld collected 11 assists in a game on September 2, 1901. As injuries and age slowed him down, Elberfeld's range became more limited later in his career.

== Minor league manager and retirement ==
Elberfeld remained active in major and minor league baseball for 30 years. From 1915 to 1917, Elberfeld managed the Chattanooga Lookouts, then went on to the Little Rock Travelers, where he managed for several years, winning a pennant in 1920. While managing the Travelers, Elberfed met a 14-year-old Travis Jackson. Elberfeld observed Jackson in an impromptu workout and later signed Jackson to his first professional contract.

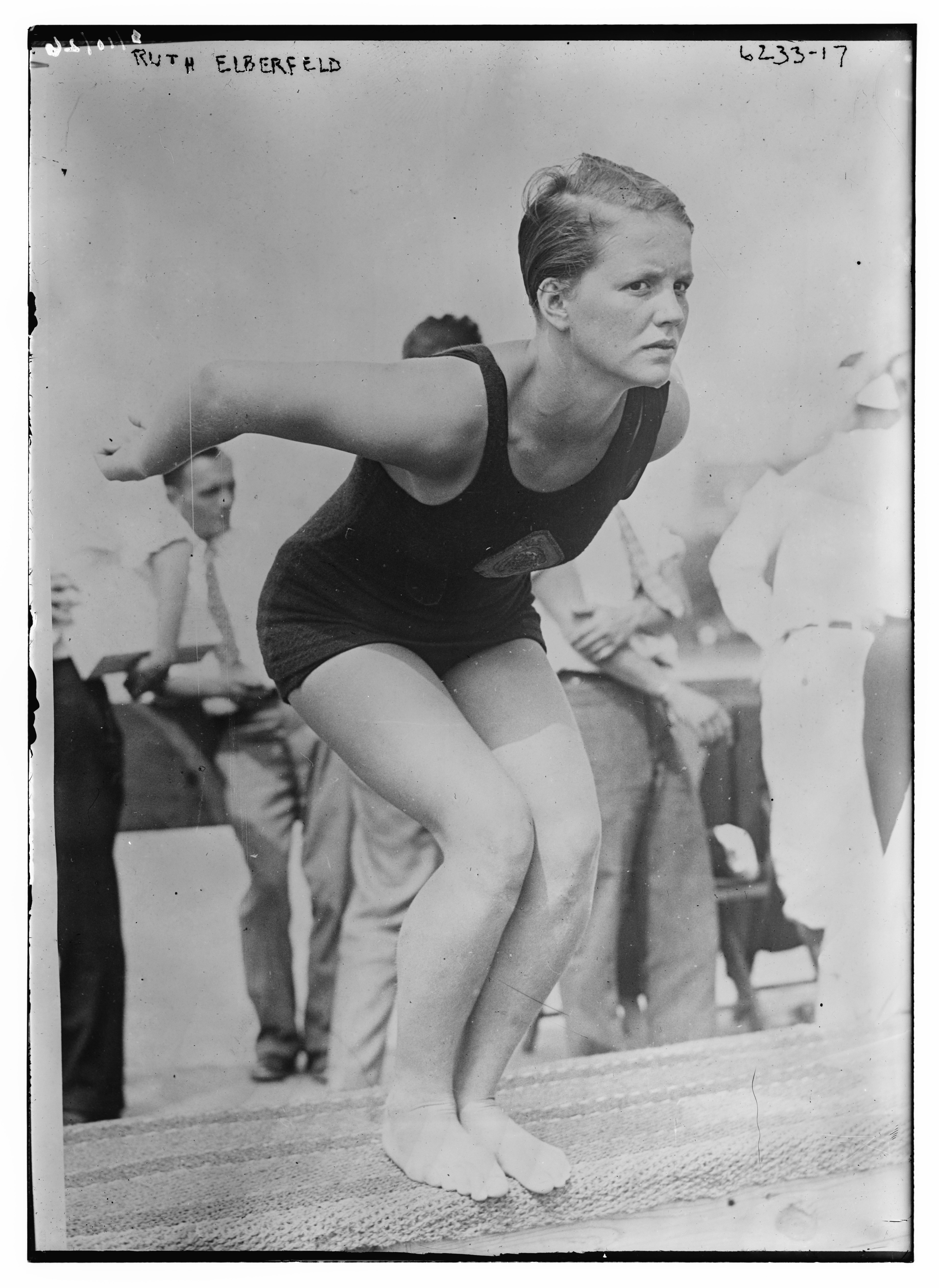
Diver Ruth Elberfeld in 1924

Early in his baseball career, Elberfeld bought an apple orchard on Signal Mountain, near Chattanooga. Elberfeld built his home and raised a family of five daughters and a son on Signal Mountain. His daughters formed a basketball team that played as "The Elberfeld Girls" and appeared on many Southern programs for several years. Elberfeld lived at his Signal Mountain home until his death in 1944.

== Managerial record ==
Team	Year	Regular season					Postseason			
Team	Year	Games	Won	Lost	Win %	Finish	Won	Lost	Win %	Result
NYH	1908	98	27	71	.276	8th in AL	–	–	–	–
Total		98	27	71	.276		0	0	–	

== See also ==
- List of Major League Baseball career stolen bases leaders
- List of Major League Baseball player-managers
