= Roy Witherup =

American baseball player

- Pitcher
- Born: July 26, 1886; North Washington, Pennsylvania, U.S.
- Died: December 13, 1941 (aged 55); New Bethlehem, Pennsylvania, U.S.
- Batted: Right Threw: Right

MLB debut
- May 14, 1906, for the Boston Beaneaters

Last MLB appearance
- September 6, 1909, for the Washington Senators

MLB statistics
- Win–loss record: 3-12
- Earned run average: 4.44
- Strikeouts: 71
- Stats at Baseball Reference

Teams
- Boston Beaneaters (1906); Washington Senators (1908–1909)

Foster Leroy Witherup (July 26, 1886 – December 13, 1941) was an American professional baseball pitcher. He played all or part of three seasons in Major League Baseball between 1906 and 1909 for the Boston Beaneaters (1906) and Washington Senators (1908–09). Listed at 6 ft 0 in (1.83 m), 185 lb., Witherup batted and threw right-handed. He was born in North Washington, Pennsylvania.

In a three-season career, Witherup posted a 3–12 record with a 4.44 earned run average in 26 appearances, including 17 starts and 12 complete games, giving up 80 earned runs on 189 hits and 47 walks while striking out 71 in 162 1/3 innings of work.

Witherup died in New Bethlehem, Pennsylvania, at the age of 55.
