= Eddie Files =

American baseball player (1883-1954)

- Pitcher
- Born: May 19, 1883; Portland, Maine, U.S.
- Died: May 10, 1954 (aged 70); Cornish, Maine, U.S.
- Batted: Right Threw: Right

MLB debut
- October 5th, 1908, for the Philadelphia Athletics

Last MLB appearance
- October 7, 1908, for the Philadelphia Athletics

MLB statistics
- Win–loss record: 0–0
- Earned run average: 6.00
- Strikeouts: 6
- Stats at Baseball Reference

Teams
- Philadelphia Athletics (1908)

Charles Edward Files (May 19, 1883 – May 10, 1954) was an American professional baseball pitcher who made two appearances, both in relief, for the Philadelphia Athletics during the 1908 Philadelphia Athletics season. He went on to win 20 games for the Holyoke Papermakers in 1909, in his only full season at the minor league level. A Maine native, Files was born in Portland and died in Cornish. He is buried in Riverside Cemetery in Cornish. He attended Bowdoin College.
