= Denny Sullivan =

American baseball player (1882–1956)

- Outfielder
- Born: September 28, 1882; Hillsboro, Wisconsin, U.S.
- Died: June 2, 1956 (aged 73); West Los Angeles, California, U.S.
- Batted: Left Threw: Right

MLB debut
- April 22, 1905, for the Washington Senators

Last MLB appearance
- September 2, 1909, for the Cleveland Naps

MLB statistics
- Batting average: .239
- Home runs: 1
- Runs batted in: 51
- Stats at Baseball Reference

Teams
- Washington Senators (1905); Boston Americans/Red Sox (1907–1908); Cleveland Naps (1908–1909)

Dennis William Sullivan (September 28, 1882 – June 2, 1956) was an American center fielder in Major League Baseball who played from 1905 through 1909 for the Washington Senators (1905), Boston Americans / Red Sox (1907–1908) and Cleveland Naps (1908–1909). A native of Hillsboro, Wisconsin, he batted left-handed and threw right-handed.

A fine outfielder with a light bat, Sullivan went 0-for-11 in his rookie season for the Senators. He received a great deal of playing time with Boston before Tris Speaker replaced him at center field. His most productive season came in 1907, when he posted career-highs in games (144), batting average (.245), hits (135), runs (73), RBI (26) and on-base percentage (.315). Traded to Cleveland in the 1908 midseason, he also played seven games for the Naps in parts of two seasons.

In a four-year career, Sullivan was a .239 hitter (221-for-925) with one home run and 51 RBI in 255 games, including 106 runs, 25 doubles, eight triples, and 30 stolen bases.

Sullivan died at the age of 73 in West Los Angeles, California.
