= Andy Nelson (baseball) =

American baseball player

- Pitcher
- Born: November 30, 1884; St. Paul, Minnesota, U.S.
- Died: Unknown
- Batted: Unknown Threw: Left

MLB debut
- May 26, 1908, for the Chicago White Sox

Last MLB appearance
- June 6, 1908, for the Chicago White Sox

MLB statistics
- Win–loss record: 0-0
- Earned run average: 2.00
- Strikeouts: 1
- Stats at Baseball Reference

Teams
- Chicago White Sox (1908)

Andrew Anthony "Peaches" Nelson (November 30, 1884 – unknown) was an American pitcher in Major League Baseball. He played for the Chicago White Sox in 1908.
