= Frank LaPorte =

American baseball player (1880–1939)

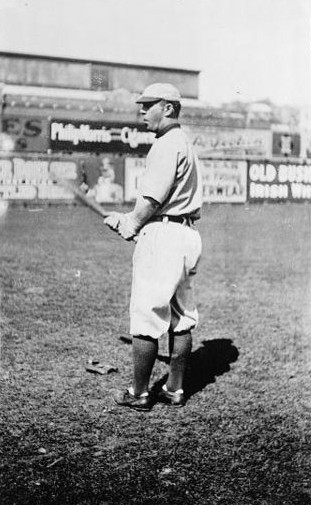
- Second baseman / Third baseman
- Born: February 6, 1880; Uhrichsville, Ohio, U.S.
- Died: September 25, 1939 (aged 59); Newcomerstown, Ohio, U.S.
- Batted: Right Threw: Right

MLB debut
- September 29, 1905, for the New York Highlanders

Last MLB appearance
- October 3, 1915, for the Newark Peppers

MLB statistics
- Batting average: .281
- Home runs: 16
- Runs batted in: 560
- Stats at Baseball Reference

Teams
- New York Highlanders (1905–1907); Boston Red Sox (1908); New York Highlanders (1908–1910); St. Louis Browns (1911–1912); Washington Senators (1912–1913); Indianapolis Hoosiers/Newark Peppers (1914–1915)

Career highlights and awards
- Federal League champion (1914); Federal League RBI leader (1914)

Frank Breyfogle Laporte (February 6, 1880 – September 25, 1939) was an American baseball player.

== Biography ==
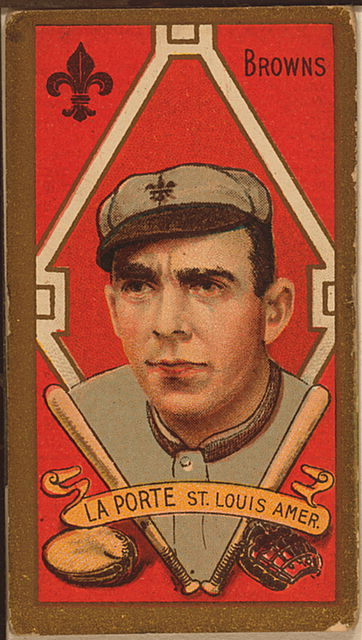

Born in Uhrichsville, Ohio, he began his major league career with the New York Highlanders (present day New York Yankees) in 1905. He was eventually traded to the St. Louis Browns, where he had his best years. In 1911 he batted a career-high .314. In 1914 LaPorte went to the Indianapolis Hoosiers of the Federal League. He led the league with 107 RBIs in 1914 while batting .311 for the first-place Indianapolis Hoosiers in 1914. His last game was on 10/03/1915. After his 1915 season, he retired.

In 1194 games over 11 seasons, LaPorte posted a .281 batting average (1185-for-4212) with 501 runs, 198 doubles, 78 triples, 16 home runs, 560 RBI, 101 stolen bases, 288 bases on balls, .331 on-base percentage and .377 slugging percentage. He finished his career with a .944 fielding percentage playing at first, second and third base and all three outfield positions.

LaPorte died of a heart attack at his home in Newcomerstown, Ohio on September 25, 1939. He was buried in Union Cemetery in Uhrichsville, Ohio.

== See also ==
- List of Major League Baseball annual runs batted in leaders
