= Jerry Freeman =

American baseball player (1879-1952)

- First baseman
- Born: December 26, 1879; Placerville, California
- Died: September 30, 1952 (aged 72); Los Angeles, California
- Batted: Left Threw: Right

MLB debut
- April 14, 1908, for the Washington Senators

Last MLB appearance
- May 21, 1909, for the Washington Senators

MLB statistics
- Batting average: .245
- Home runs: 1
- Runs batted in: 48
- Stats at Baseball Reference

Teams
- Washington Senators (1908–1909)

Frank Ellsworth Freeman (December 26, 1879 – September 30, 1952), nicknamed "Buck", was a professional baseball first baseman who played in Major League Baseball for the Washington Senators.
