= Charlie Nyce =

American baseball player (1870–1908)

- Shortstop
- Born: July 1, 1870; Philadelphia, Pennsylvania, U.S.
- Died: May 9, 1908 (aged 37); Philadelphia, Pennsylvania, U.S.
- Batted: Unknown Threw: Unknown

MLB debut
- May 28, 1895, for the Boston Beaneaters

Last MLB appearance
- August 28, 1895, for the Boston Beaneaters

MLB statistics
- Batting average: .229
- Home runs: 2
- Runs batted in: 9
- Stats at Baseball Reference

Teams
- Boston Beaneaters (1895)

Charles Reiff Nyce (born Charles Reiff Nice) (July 1, 1870 – May 9, 1908) was an American professional baseball player. He played in nine games in Major League Baseball for the Boston Beaneaters of the National League during the 1895 season as a shortstop.

Prior to his major league stint, he played from 1892-94 in the Pennsylvania State League and after he left the Beaneaters, he played from 1895–1900 in the minors, with stops in the New England League, Western League, Eastern League, Atlantic League and Connecticut State League.
