= Charlie Jones (outfielder) =

American baseball player (1876–1947)

- Center fielder
- Born: June 2, 1876; Butler, Pennsylvania, U.S.
- Died: April 2, 1947 (aged 70); Two Harbors, Minnesota, U.S.
- Batted: Right Threw: Right

MLB debut
- May 2, 1901, for the Boston Americans

Last MLB appearance
- August 14, 1908, for the St. Louis Browns

MLB statistics
- Batting average: .233
- Home runs: 5
- Runs batted in: 144
- Stats at Baseball Reference

Teams
- Boston Americans (1901); Chicago White Sox (1904); Washington Senators (1905–1907); St. Louis Browns (1908)

Charles Claude "Casey" Jones (June 2, 1876 – April 2, 1947) was an American professional baseball center fielder who played in Major League Baseball (MLB) for the Boston Americans, Chicago White Sox, Washington Senators, and St. Louis Browns.

A fine defensive player with a strong arm, Jones entered the majors in 1901 with the Boston Americans, playing for them one year before joining the Chicago White Sox (1904), Washington Senators (1905–1907) and St. Louis Browns (1908). Strictly a line-drive hitter and good base runner, he was a utilityman, playing in all infield and outfield positions except third base. His primary position was at center field, where he appeared in 443 of his 483 major league games. His most productive season came in 1906 for Washington, when he posted career-numbers in hits (120), triples (11) and stolen bases. In 1905, he collected 441 outs to rank 8th among American League outfielders.

In a six-season career, Jones was a .233 hitter (420-for-1799) with five home runs and 144 run batted in, including 217 runs, 56 doubles, 28 triples, and 100 stolen bases. He also posted a collective .967 fielding percentage in 1137 chances.

Jones died in Two Harbors, Minnesota at age 70.
