= Dave Altizer =

American baseball player (1876–1964)

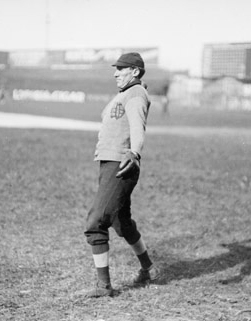
- Shortstop
- Born: November 6, 1876; Pearl, Illinois, U.S.
- Died: May 14, 1964 (aged 87); Pleasant Hill, Illinois, U.S.
- Batted: Left Threw: Right

MLB debut
- May 29, 1906, for the Washington Senators

Last MLB appearance
- July 10, 1911, for the Cincinnati Reds

MLB statistics
- Batting average: .250
- Home runs: 4
- Runs batted in: 116
- Stats at Baseball Reference

Teams
- Washington Senators (1906–1908); Cleveland Naps (1908); Chicago White Sox (1909); Cincinnati Reds (1910–1911)

David Tilden Altizer (November 6, 1876 – May 14, 1964) was an American Major League Baseball shortstop who played six seasons for the Washington Senators, Cleveland Naps, Chicago White Sox, and Cincinnati Reds of Major League Baseball.

Altizer served in the military in the early 20th century, and he did not appear in professional baseball until he was 25. He spent four seasons playing mostly in the Connecticut State League before he debuted in the major leagues with the 1906 Washington Senators. On July 23, 1908, the Cleveland Naps of the American League purchased Altizer and Cy Falkenberg from the Senators for $10,000 ($358,333 in current dollar terms).

Altizer's youngest brother, Oren, was killed in military action in France in 1918. Newspaper reports initially mischaracterized Oren as Altizer's son, but Altizer's only son was a school-aged child at the time.

In 514 games over six seasons, Altizer posted a .250 batting average (433-for-1734) with 204 runs, 4 home runs, 116 RBIs, and 119 stolen bases. He finished his career with a .952 fielding percentage playing at all positions except catcher and pitcher.

He died in Pleasant Hill, Illinois, at the age of 87.
