= 1908 Major League Baseball season =

1908 MLB season
- League: American League (AL); National League (NL)
- Sport: Baseball
- Duration: Regular season: April 14 – October 8, 1908; World Series: October 10–14, 1908
- Games: 154
- Teams: 16 (8 per league)

Pennant winners
- AL champions: Detroit Tigers
- AL runners-up: Cleveland Naps
- NL champions: Chicago Cubs
- NL runners-up: New York Giants

World Series
- Champions: Chicago Cubs
- Runners-up: Detroit Tigers

MLB seasons
- ← 1907 1909 →

Locations of teams for the 1908 American League season
American League
Locations of teams for the 1907–1908 National League seasons
National League

The 1908 major league baseball season began on April 14, 1908. The regular season ended on October 8, with the Chicago Cubs and Detroit Tigers as regular season champions of the National League and American League, respectively. In a rematch of the prior year's postseason, the postseason began with Game 1 of the fifth modern World Series on October 10 and ended with Game 5 on October 14. In the second iteration of this World Series matchup (and a rematch of the previous year), The Cubs defeated the Tigers, four games to one, capturing their second championship in franchise history, and the first team to win back-to-back World Series.

The Boston Americans renamed as the Boston Red Sox.

== Schedule ==
The 1908 schedule consisted of 154 games for all teams in the American League and National League, each of which had eight teams. Each team was scheduled to play 22 games against the other seven teams of their respective league. This continued the format put in place for the 1904 season. This format would last until 1919.

Opening Day took place on April 14 with all but the Pittsburgh Pirates and St. Louis Cardinals playing. The final day of the regular season was on October 8. The World Series took place between October 10 and October 14.

== Rule changes ==
The 1908 season saw the following rule changes:

- The American League made the following rule changes:
  - Language on postponed games was adopted, stating "All postponed games of the first series shall be played on the first or succeeding days of the second series; all postponed games of the second and third series shall be played on the next day or succeeding day of the same series."
  - A rule stating "restricts the practice of acquiring a player by refusing waiver on him and then immediately turning him over to a club outside the league."
- On February 27, 1908, the three organizations of the National Commission of Baseball Clubs, National League, and American League announced several rule changes, effective immediately.
  - The act of rubbing the ball on the ground, clothing, shoes, or dropping the ball and picking it up with a handful of gravel or dirt by the pitcher was prohibited.
  - The sacrifice fly rule is adopted. No time at bat is charged if a run scores after the catch of a fly ball. The rule would eventually be repealed in 1931, then reinstated (or changed) several times before gaining permanent acceptance in 1954.
  - The trend of each team playing 22 games with every other in-league team was written into the Major League Baseball Constitution, with rules for playing makeup games at the originally scheduled ballpark in the event of tie games, rain delays, and other game-preventing situations being put in place. If the series of all scheduled games has ended with makeup games remaining, if possible, the remaining game(s) can be made up on the opposite team's ballpark, with a date agreed by the two teams.

== Teams ==
League	Team	City	Ballpark	Capacity	Manager
American League	Boston Red Sox	Boston, Massachusetts	Huntington Avenue Grounds	11,500	Deacon McGuire
American League	Boston Red Sox	Boston, Massachusetts	Huntington Avenue Grounds	11,500	Fred Lake
American League	Chicago White Sox	Chicago, Illinois	South Side Park	15,000	Fielder Jones
American League	Cleveland Naps	Cleveland, Ohio	League Park (Cleveland)	9,000	Nap Lajoie
American League	Detroit Tigers	Detroit, Michigan	Bennett Park	8,500	Hughie Jennings
American League	New York Highlanders	New York, New York	Hilltop Park	16,000	Clark Griffith
American League	New York Highlanders	New York, New York	Hilltop Park	16,000	Kid Elberfeld
American League	Philadelphia Athletics	Philadelphia, Pennsylvania	Columbia Park	13,600	Connie Mack
American League	St. Louis Browns	St. Louis, Missouri	Sportsman's Park	8,000	Jimmy McAleer
American League	Washington Senators	Washington, D.C.	National Park	9,000	Joe Cantillon
National League	Boston Doves	Boston, Massachusetts	South End Grounds	9,800	Joe Kelley
National League	Brooklyn Superbas	New York, New York	Washington Park	14,000	Patsy Donovan
National League	Chicago Cubs	Chicago, Illinois	West Side Park	16,000	Frank Chance
National League	Cincinnati Reds	Cincinnati, Ohio	Palace of the Fans	12,000	John Ganzel
National League	New York Giants	New York, New York	Polo Grounds	16,000	John McGraw
National League	Philadelphia Phillies	Philadelphia, Pennsylvania	National League Park	18,000	Billy Murray
National League	Pittsburgh Pirates	Pittsburgh, Pennsylvania	Exposition Park	16,000	Fred Clarke
National League	St. Louis Cardinals	St. Louis, Missouri	League Park (St. Louis)	15,200	John McCloskey

== Standings ==
=== American League ===
American League
Team	W	L	Pct.	GB	Home	Road
Detroit Tigers	90	63	.588	—	44‍–‍33	46‍–‍30
Cleveland Naps	90	64	.584	½	51‍–‍26	39‍–‍38
Chicago White Sox	88	64	.579	1½	51‍–‍25	37‍–‍39
St. Louis Browns	83	69	.546	6½	46‍–‍31	37‍–‍38
Boston Red Sox	75	79	.487	15½	37‍–‍40	38‍–‍39
Philadelphia Athletics	68	85	.444	22	46‍–‍30	22‍–‍55
Washington Senators	67	85	.441	22½	43‍–‍32	24‍–‍53
New York Highlanders	51	103	.331	39½	30‍–‍47	21‍–‍56

=== National League ===
National League
Team	W	L	Pct.	GB	Home	Road
Chicago Cubs	99	55	.643	—	47‍–‍30	52‍–‍25
New York Giants	98	56	.636	1	52‍–‍25	46‍–‍31
Pittsburgh Pirates	98	56	.636	1	42‍–‍35	56‍–‍21
Philadelphia Phillies	83	71	.539	16	43‍–‍34	40‍–‍37
Cincinnati Reds	73	81	.474	26	40‍–‍37	33‍–‍44
Boston Doves	63	91	.409	36	35‍–‍42	28‍–‍49
Brooklyn Superbas	53	101	.344	46	27‍–‍50	26‍–‍51
St. Louis Cardinals	49	105	.318	50	28‍–‍49	21‍–‍56

=== Tie games ===
16 tie games (10 in AL, 6 in NL), which are not factored into winning percentage or games behind (and were often replayed again), occurred throughout the season.

==== American League ====
- Boston Red Sox, 1
- Chicago White Sox, 4
- Cleveland Naps, 3
- Detroit Tigers, 1
- New York Highlanders, 1
- Philadelphia Athletics, 4
- St. Louis Browns, 3
- Washington Senators, 3

==== National League ====
- Boston Doves, 2
- Chicago Cubs, 4
- Cincinnati Reds, 1
- New York Giants, 3
- Philadelphia Phillies, 1
- Pittsburgh Pirates, 1

== Postseason ==
The postseason began on October 10 and ended on October 14 with the Chicago Cubs defeating the Detroit Tigers in the 1908 World Series in five games.

=== Bracket ===
World Series
AL	Detroit Tigers	1
NL	Chicago Cubs	4

== Managerial changes ==
=== Off-season ===
Team	Former Manager	New Manager
Boston Doves	Fred Tenney	Joe Kelley
Cincinnati Reds	Ned Hanlon	John Ganzel

=== In-season ===
Team	Former Manager	New Manager
Boston Red Sox	Deacon McGuire	Fred Lake
New York Highlanders	Clark Griffith	Kid Elberfeld

== League leaders ==
Any team shown in small text indicates a previous team a player was on during the season.

=== American League ===
Hitting leaders
Stat	Player	Total
AVG	Ty Cobb (DET)	.324
OPS	Ty Cobb (DET)	.844
HR	Sam Crawford (DET)	7
RBI	Ty Cobb (DET)	108
R	Matty McIntyre (DET)	105
H	Ty Cobb (DET)	188
SB	Patsy Dougherty (CWS)	47

Pitching leaders
Stat	Player	Total
W	Ed Walsh (CWS)	40
L	Joe Lake (NYH)	22
ERA	Addie Joss (CLE)	1.16
K	Ed Walsh (CWS)	269
IP	Ed Walsh^{1} (CWS)	464.0
SV	Ed Walsh (CWS)	6
WHIP	Addie Joss (CLE)	0.806

^{1} Modern (1901–present) single-season innings pitched record

=== National League ===
Hitting leaders
Stat	Player	Total
AVG	Honus Wagner (PIT)	.354
OPS	Honus Wagner (PIT)	.957
HR	Tim Jordan (BRO)	12
RBI	Honus Wagner (PIT)	109
R	Fred Tenney (NYG)	101
H	Honus Wagner (PIT)	201
SB	Honus Wagner (PIT)	53

Pitching leaders
Stat	Player	Total
W	Christy Mathewson^{2} (NYG)	37
L	Bugs Raymond (STL)	25
ERA	Christy Mathewson^{2} (NYG)	1.43
K	Christy Mathewson^{2} (NYG)	259
IP	Christy Mathewson (NYG)	390.2
SV	Mordecai Brown (CHC); Christy Mathewson (NYG); Joe McGinnity (NYG)	5
WHIP	Christy Mathewson (NYG)	0.827

^{2} National League Triple Crown pitching winner

== Milestones ==
=== Batters ===
==== Cycles ====
- Otis Clymer (WSH):
  - Clymer hit for his first cycle and first in franchise history, on October 2 against the New York Highlanders.

==== Other batting accomplishments ====
- Honus Wagner (PIT):
  - Recorded his 500th career stolen base against the Cincinnati Reds on June 21. He became the 15th player to reach this mark.
- George Davis (CWS):
  - Recorded his 600th career stolen base against the Detroit Tigers on July 5. He became the fourth player to reach this mark.

=== Pitchers ===
==== Perfect games ====
- Addie Joss (CLE):
  - Pitched the fourth perfect game in major league history and the first in franchise history on October 2 against the Chicago White Sox. Joss threw 74 pitches (the lowest known pitch count ever for a perfect game) and struck out three in the 1–0 victory.

==== No-hitters ====
- Cy Young (BOS):
  - Young threw his third career no-hitter and the fourth no-hitter in franchise history, by defeating the New York Highlanders 8–0 on June 30. Young walked one and struck out two.
- Hooks Wiltse (NYG):
  - Wiltse threw his first career no-hitter and the fourth no-hitter in franchise history, by defeating the Philadelphia Phillies 1–0 in 10 innings on the first game of a doubleheader on July 4. Wiltse hit one batter by pitch and struck out five.
- Nap Rucker (BRO):
  - Rucker threw his first career no-hitter and the sixth no-hitter in franchise history, by defeating the Boston Doves 6–0 on the second game of a doubleheader on September 5. Rucker walked zero batters by pitch and struck out 14, though two batters would reach base via error.
- Bob Rhoads (CLE):
  - Rhoads threw his first career no-hitter and the first no-hitter in franchise history, by defeating the Boston Red Sox 2–1 on September 18. Rhoads walked two, hit one by pitch, and struck out two.
- Frank Smith (CWS):
  - Smith threw his second career no-hitter and the third no-hitter in franchise history, by defeating the Philadelphia Athletics 1–0 on September 20. Smith walked one and struck out two, though allowed two runners on base.

==== Other pitching accomplishments ====
- Ed Reulbach (CHC):
  - Reulbach pitched two shutouts in a doubleheader against the Brooklyn Superbas on September 26, winning both games 5–0 and 3–0.

=== Miscellaneous ===
- St. Louis Cardinals:
  - Set a Major League record for least runs scored in a full season, by scoring only 372 runs.

== Home field attendance ==
Team name	Wins	%±	Home attendance	%±	Per game
New York Giants	98	19.5%	910,000	69.0%	11,375
Chicago Cubs	99	−7.5%	665,325	57.5%	8,530
Chicago White Sox	88	1.1%	636,096	−4.5%	8,155
St. Louis Browns	83	20.3%	618,947	47.7%	7,935
Boston Red Sox	75	27.1%	473,048	8.3%	6,143
Philadelphia Athletics	68	−22.7%	455,062	−27.3%	5,834
Detroit Tigers	90	−2.2%	436,199	46.8%	5,592
Cleveland Naps	90	5.9%	422,262	10.5%	5,414
Philadelphia Phillies	83	0.0%	420,660	23.3%	5,393
Cincinnati Reds	73	10.6%	399,200	25.7%	5,184
Pittsburgh Pirates	98	7.7%	382,444	19.7%	4,967
New York Highlanders	51	−27.1%	305,500	−12.7%	3,968
Brooklyn Superbas	53	−18.5%	275,600	−11.8%	3,579
Washington Senators	67	36.7%	264,252	19.1%	3,388
Boston Doves	63	8.6%	253,750	24.9%	3,253
St. Louis Cardinals	49	−5.8%	205,129	10.7%	2,664

== Venues ==
The Philadelphia Athletics would play their final game at Columbia Park with a doubleheader on October 3 against the Boston Red Sox, moving into Shibe Park for the start of the 1909 season.

== See also ==
- 1908 in baseball (Events, Births, Deaths)

== Bibliography ==
- Anderson, David W. (2000). More Than Merkle: A History of the Best and Most Exciting Baseball Season in Human History. Lincoln, Nebraska: University of Nebraska Press. ISBN 0-8032-1056-6.
- Fleming, G.H. (1981). The Unforgettable Season: The Most Exciting & Calamitous Pennant Race of All Time. New York: Holt, Rinehart & Winston. ISBN 0-03-056221-X.
- Murphy, Cait. (2007). Crazy '08: How a Cast of Cranks, Rogues, Boneheads, and Magnates Created the Greatest Year in Baseball History. New York: HarperCollins/Smithsonian Books. ISBN 0-06-088937-3.
