= Joe Lake =

American baseball player (1881–1950)

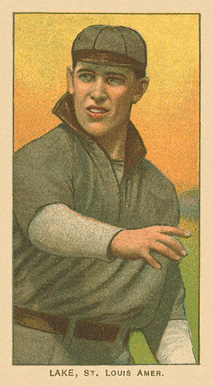
- Pitcher
- Born: January 6, 1881; Brooklyn, New York, U.S.
- Died: June 30, 1950 (aged 69); Brooklyn, New York, U.S.
- Batted: Right Threw: Right

MLB debut
- April 21, 1908, for the New York Highlanders

Last MLB appearance
- August 25, 1913, for the Detroit Tigers

MLB statistics
- Win–loss record: 62–90
- Earned run average: 2.85
- Strikeouts: 594
- Stats at Baseball Reference

Teams
- New York Highlanders (1908–1909); St. Louis Browns (1910–1912); Detroit Tigers (1912–1913)

Joseph Henry Lake (January 6, 1881 – June 30, 1950) was an American pitcher in Major League Baseball from 1908 to 1913. He played for the New York Highlanders, St. Louis Browns, and Detroit Tigers. Lake made his major league debut on April 21, 1908; his final game was five years later on August 25, 1913. Lake's key pitches were the spitball and the fastball.

Lake retired from baseball in 1917 and moved to work as an electrician for Todd Shipyards in Brooklyn. He retired from that job in 1947. Lake was a patient at Brooklyn Methodist Hospital for three weeks until his death on June 30, 1950. His burial was held at St. John Cemetery in Middle Village, Queens.
