= Heinie Berger =

American baseball player (1882-1954)

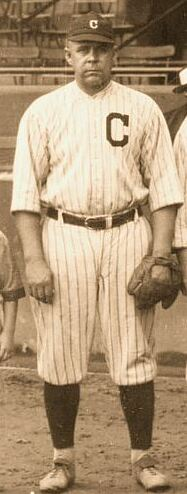
- Berger at an old-timers' game in 1921
- Pitcher
- Born: January 7, 1882; LaSalle, Illinois, U.S.
- Died: February 10, 1954 (aged 72); Lakewood, Ohio, U.S.
- Batted: Right Threw: Right

MLB debut
- May 6, 1907, for the Cleveland Naps

Last MLB appearance
- July 22, 1910, for the Cleveland Naps

MLB statistics
- Win–loss record: 32–29
- Earned run average: 2.60
- Strikeouts: 337
- Stats at Baseball Reference

Teams
- Cleveland Naps (1907–1910)

Charles Carl "Heinie" Berger (January 7, 1882 – February 10, 1954) was an American professional baseball pitcher. Berger played in Major League Baseball (MLB) for four seasons for the Cleveland Naps from 1907 to 1910.

== Biography ==
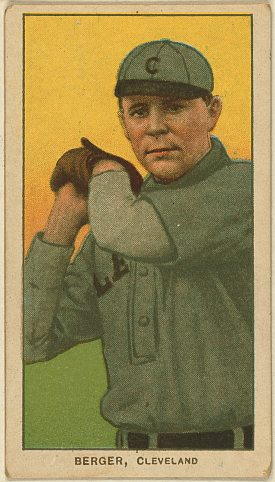
Berger baseball card, c. 1911

Berger, a native of Greenfield, Indiana, started his professional baseball career with the Spring Lake Park semi-pro team. In 1905 and 1906 he won 25 and 28 games respectively with the Columbus Senators of the American Association before coming to the majors.

He made his major league debut May 6, 1907, and played his final game on July 22, 1910. His best years were 1908 and 1909, with Berger winning 13 games in each of those seasons. He started 68 games for the Naps and ended his career with a 32–29 win loss record and a 2.60 earned run average. In 1909, he led all American League pitchers, striking out an average of 5.90 batters per 9-innings pitched. He struck out a total of 162 batters in 1909, 3rd in the American League. Berger also led the league in wild pitches in 1909 with 13.

Berger died of a heart attack in 1954 in Cleveland. He was buried at Lake View Cemetery Cuyahoga County, Ohio.
