= Otis Clymer =

American baseball player (1876–1926)

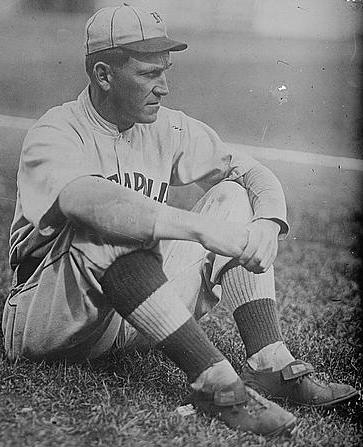
- Right fielder
- Born: January 27, 1876; Pine Grove, Pennsylvania, U.S.
- Died: February 27, 1926 (aged 50); Saint Paul, Minnesota, U.S.
- Batted: Both Threw: Right

MLB debut
- April 14, 1905, for the Pittsburgh Pirates

Last MLB appearance
- August 8, 1913, for the Boston Braves

MLB statistics
- Batting average: .267
- Home runs: 2
- Runs batted in: 98
- Stats at Baseball Reference

Teams
- Pittsburgh Pirates (1905–1907); Washington Senators (1907–1909); Chicago Cubs (1913); Boston Braves (1913)

Otis Edgar Clymer (January 27, 1876 – February 27, 1926) was an American Major League Baseball player who was primarily a right fielder for four teams during his six-season career. Born in Pine Grove, Pennsylvania, he played for the Pittsburgh Pirates, Washington Senators, Chicago Cubs, and the Boston Braves from 1905 to 1913.

Clymer's most notable moment came on October 2, 1908, when he hit for the cycle. When he left Major League baseball, he played for the minor league Minneapolis Millers of the American Association from 1911 to 1914.

In 385 games over six seasons, Clymer posted a .267 batting average (355-for-1330) with 182 runs, 2 home runs, 98 RBI, 83 stolen bases and 99 bases on balls.

After his baseball career, which was hampered by constant leg injuries, Clymer became a car dealer. He died at age 50 from an automobile accident in St. Paul, Minnesota. He is interred at Willow River Cemetery in Hudson, Wisconsin.

== See also ==
- List of Major League Baseball players to hit for the cycle

Achievements
Preceded by Johnny Bates	Hitting for the cycle October 2, 1908	Succeeded by Chief Wilson
