= Joe Cantillon =

American baseball manager and umpire

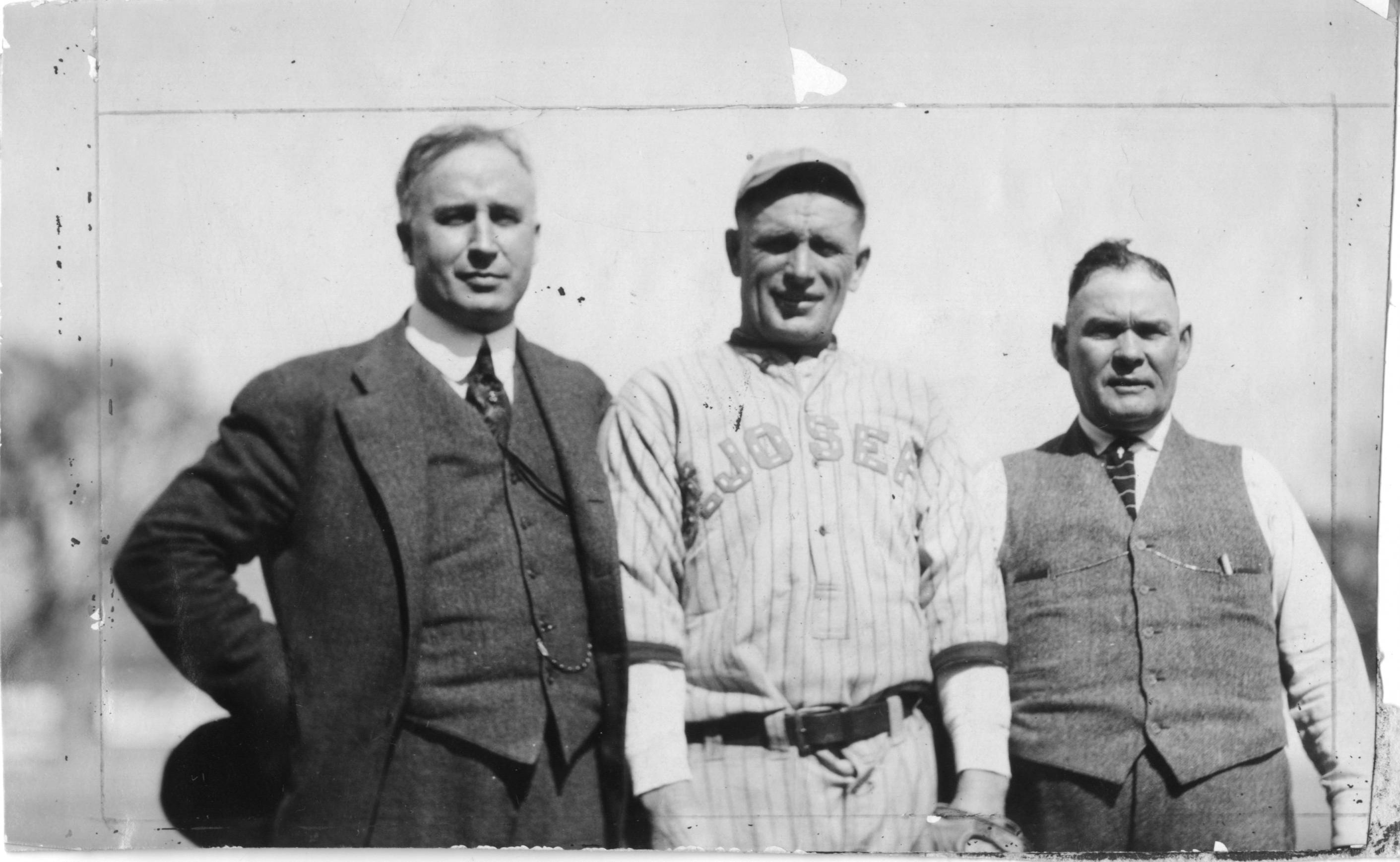
- Cantillon (right)
- Manager / Umpire
- Born: August 19, 1861; Janesville, Wisconsin, U.S.
- Died: January 31, 1930 (aged 68); Hickman, Kentucky, U.S.

MLB statistics
- Managerial record: 158–297
- Winning percentage: .347
- Stats at Baseball Reference

Teams
- As umpire: American League (1901); National League (1902); As manager: Washington Senators (1907–1909)

Joseph D. Cantillon (August 19, 1861 – January 31, 1930), nicknamed "Pongo Joe", was an American manager and umpire in Major League Baseball during the first decade of the 20th century. He also was a longtime manager in minor league baseball. He was born in Janesville, Wisconsin.

Cantillon, a second baseman who played in the 19th-century minor leagues, is one of the handful of men who both umpired and managed in the majors. He officiated in the American League in 1901 and the National League for part of the 1902 season. He was a controversial umpire who had to be removed from the field on some occasions, including a game in Boston where fans attacked him (he had to be rescued by Chick Stahl and Parson Lewis).

In 1907 Cantillon became the manager of the Washington Senators, but his tenure there was disastrous. In Cantillon's three years in Washington, his team never finished higher than seventh place in the AL and lost 100 games twice. The only bright spot was the discovery of Walter Johnson, who would become perhaps the greatest pitcher in American League history. After the 1909 season, Cantillon was fired. He finished his big-league managerial career with a 158–297 record (a .347 winning percentage).

Cantillon's minor league managerial career stretched back to 1893, when he was skipper of the Oakland Colonels of the California League; his team finished first that season. He managed in the old Western Association sporadically in the late 1890s. After his two years as an umpire, Cantillon resumed his minor league managerial career with the Milwaukee Brewers of the American Association from 1903 to 1906, his team never finishing below third place.

After his firing in Washington, Cantillon returned to the Association, where he led the Minneapolis Millers to the league championship in 1910–11–12 and in 1915. He spent 13 1/2 years (1910 through the midseason of 1923) in the Millers' managerial post. He also was a part-owner in the franchise, along with his brother Mike. Ironically, the former umpire was known as a hot-tempered skipper who was frequently ejected from games, especially during his long minor league tenure. He also operated a saloon in Chicago before Prohibition that was frequented by baseball people.

Joe Cantillon died in Hickman, Kentucky, from a stroke at age 68.
