= Bob Rhoads =

American baseball player (1879–1967)

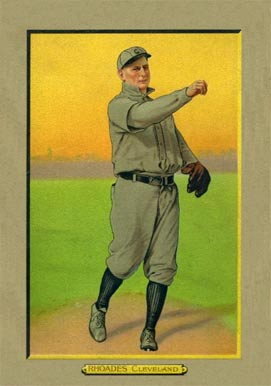
- Pitcher
- Born: October 4, 1879; Wooster, Ohio, U.S.
- Died: February 12, 1967 (aged 87); San Bernardino, California, U.S.
- Batted: Right Threw: Right

MLB debut
- April 19, 1902, for the Chicago Orphans

Last MLB appearance
- August 19, 1909, for the Cleveland Naps

MLB statistics
- Win–loss record: 97–82
- Earned run average: 2.61
- Strikeouts: 522
- Stats at Baseball Reference

Teams
- Chicago Orphans (1902); St. Louis Cardinals (1903); Cleveland Naps (1903–1909)

Career highlights and awards
- Pitched a no-hitter on September 18, 1908

Barton Emory (Bob) Rhoads (October 4, 1879 – February 12, 1967), nicknamed "Dusty", was an American major league pitcher for the Chicago Orphans, Cleveland Naps, and St. Louis Cardinals in the early 20th century. His best year was in 1906, when he won 22 games and had a 1.80 ERA. He finished his career with a 97–82 record, a 2.61 ERA and 522 strikeouts in 1,691.2 innings pitched.

He is buried at Mountain View Memorial Park in Barstow, California.

== See also ==
- List of Major League Baseball no-hitters

Preceded by Nap Rucker	No-hitter pitcher September 18, 1908	Succeeded by Frank Smith
