= Frank Smith (1900s pitcher) =

American baseball player (1879–1952)

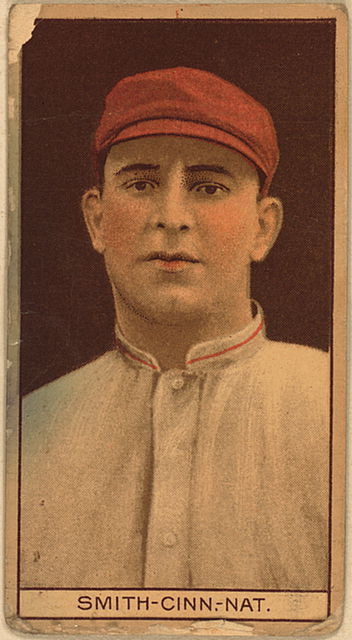
- Pitcher
- Born: October 28, 1879; Pittsburgh, Pennsylvania, U.S.
- Died: November 3, 1952 (aged 73); Pittsburgh, Pennsylvania, U.S.
- Batted: Right Threw: Right

MLB debut
- April 22, 1904, for the Chicago White Sox

Last MLB appearance
- September 30, 1915, for the Brooklyn Tip-Tops

MLB statistics
- Win–loss record: 139–111
- Earned run average: 2.59
- Strikeouts: 1,051
- Stats at Baseball Reference

Teams
- Chicago White Sox (1904–1910); Boston Red Sox (1910–1911); Cincinnati Reds (1911–1912); Baltimore Terrapins (1914–1915); Brooklyn Tip-Tops (1915)

Career highlights and awards
- AL strikeout leader (1909); Pitched two no-hitters (1905, 1908)

Frank Elmer Smith (October 28, 1879 – November 3, 1952) was a right-handed pitcher in Major League Baseball from 1904 to 1915. He played for the Chicago White Sox, Boston Red Sox, Cincinnati Reds, Baltimore Terrapins, and Brooklyn Tip-Tops. Nicknamed "Piano Mover" because that was his offseason job, Smith was a mainstay of the White Sox pitching staff during the early 20th century. He pitched two no-hitters and won over 20 games in two different seasons. He stood at 5' 10" and weighed 194 lbs.

== Career ==
Smith was born in Pittsburgh, Pennsylvania. After attending Grove City College, he started his professional baseball career in 1901 in the Virginia-North Carolina League. In 1903, he went 18–13 on the mound. He was drafted by the White Sox in September.

Smith made his major league debut in April 1904. That season, he was taught how to throw a spitball by Elmer Stricklett and was able to harness the pitch on his way to 16 wins. In 1905, he improved to 19 wins. Smith threw his first no-hitter, against the Detroit Tigers, on September 6, and the final score (15–0) was the most lopsided in a no-hitter in American League history. Smith did not allow a home run in either 1904 or 1905 and kept his earned run average under 2.20 in both seasons, as well.

The "Piano Mover" slumped in 1906, going just 5–5 with a 3.39 ERA. The White Sox won the World Series that year, but Smith did not pitch in the six games. The next season, he bounced back with 23 wins, although his ERA+ was below 100 and he also led the league in walks. He then lowered his ERA to 2.03 in 1908. On September 20, he pitched his second no-hitter, this time against the Philadelphia Athletics. He won the game 1–0 when Chicago scored the only run in the bottom of the ninth inning. Smith was the only pitcher in team history to throw two no-hitters before Mark Buehrle accomplished the feat over 100 years later.

Smith had his best statistical season in 1909. Finally the White Sox staff ace, he pitched a career-high 365 innings and went 25–17 with a 1.80 ERA. He led all AL pitchers in games started, innings pitched, and strikeouts, and he finished second in wins. In 1910, Smith started off 4–9 and was traded to the Red Sox in August. He was then sold to the Reds in 1911. Smith spent 1912 and 1913 in the International League and led the league in innings pitched in 1913 while winning 21 games. He finished his career with two seasons in the Federal League.

Smith was a good hitting pitcher in his 11-year major league career. He posted a .204 batting average (156-for-766) with 81 runs, 41 doubles, 9 triples, 2 home runs, 85 RBI and 64 bases on balls. Defensively, he was better than average, recording a .962 fielding percentage which was 17 points higher than the league average at his position.

After his baseball career ended, Smith went back to the moving business. He died in 1952, of Bright's disease.

== See also ==
- List of Major League Baseball annual strikeout leaders
- List of Major League Baseball no-hitters

Preceded by Weldon Henley; Bob Rhoads	No-hitter pitcher September 6, 1905; September 20, 1908	Succeeded by Bill Dinneen; Addie Joss
