= Lynn Shoemakers =

- 1888–1913; (1877–1878, 1886–1888, 1891, 1901, 1905–1916); Lynn, Massachusetts

Minor league affiliations
- Class: Independent (1877–1878, 1886–1888, 1901); Class B (1891, 1905–1916)
- League: New England Association (1877); International Association (1878); New England League (1886–1888, 1891, 1901, 1905–1915); Eastern League (1916)

Major league affiliations
- Team: None

Minor league titles
- League titles (0): None
- Wild card berths (0): None

Team data
- Name: Lynn Live Oaks (1877–1878, 1901); Lynn Lions (1886–1887); Lynn (1891); Lynn Shoemakers (1888, 1905–1910, 1913); Lynn Leonardites (1911–1912); Lynn Fighters (1914); Lynn Pirates (1915); Lynn Pipers (1916)
- Ballpark: West Lynn Grounds (1877–1878); Glenmere Park (1886–1888, 1891, 1901); Ocean Park (1905–1916)

The Lynn Shoemakers were an early minor league baseball team based in Lynn, Massachusetts. The "Shoemakers" and other Lynn teams played as members of the New England League beginning in 1877 and continuing through the 1915 season. Lynn played the 1916 season as members of the Eastern League, after the New England League was renamed. The Lynn "Shoemakers" nickname corresponded with Lynn's large shoemaking industry in the era.

The Lynn teams hosted home minor league home games at the West Lynn Grounds (1877–1878), Glenmere Park (1886–1888, 1891, 1901) and Ocean Park (1905–1916).

In 1906, Thomas F. Burke, of the Lynn Shoemakers died after being hit in the temple by a pitch during a home game in Lynn.

Four Baseball Hall of Fame members played for Lynn teams. Candy Cummings was a player/manager for the Lynn Live Oaks in 1877 and Bud Fowler played for the 1878 Live Oaks, breaking the color barrier in the International Association for organized baseball. Billy Hamilton served as player/manager for the 1909 and 1910 Lynn Shoemakers. Pitcher Waite Hoyt played for the 1916 Lynn Pipers at age 16.

The 1926 Lynn Papooses resumed Lynn's tenure as a member of the New England League.

== History ==
=== Early minor league teams 1877 to 1891 ===
In the 1877 season, Lynn, Massachusetts first hosted minor league baseball. The Lynn "Live Oaks" became members of the newly formed New England League, also known as the New England "Association." The league began play on May 3, 1877, as an eight–team league and ended the season as a four-team league. The league championship was won by the Lowell Ladies Men, with a 33–7 record; Lowell finished 4.0 games ahead of the second place Manchester Reds, who had a 29–11 record. Lowell and Manchester were followed by the Fall River Cascades (19–21) and Providence Rhode Islanders (11–29) teams in the final standings. The Lynn Live Oaks (8–22), Fitchburg, Haverhill and Lawrence Indians teams all folded before the 1877 New England Association season ended on October 15, 1877. Candy Cummings served as player/manager for Lynnm who also accumulated a 1-9 record in International Association contests. The New England Association folded after the 1877 season.

In the winter of 1877, Baseball Hall of Fame member Candy Cummings declined a major contract. Instead, Cummings joined the Lynn Live Oaks as the team's player/manager. That winter, Cummings attended the convention that created the new player-controlled league, and the delegates elected him as the first president of the International Association. However, Cummings did not stay long with the Live Oaks as the team in late June, Cummings then signed with the Cincinnati Red Stockings to complete the 1877 season. Cummings was a charter member of the Baseball Hall of Fame, inducted in 1939.

In 1878, the Lynn Live Oaks team continued play as members of the International Association. There were 12 member teams in the association. During the season, the Live Oaks merged with Worcester on June 1, 1878. The team ended the International Association 1878 season with a record of 9–26, placing tenth in the twelve-team league's final standings. George Brackett served as manager and Lynn ended the season 17.0 games behind the first place Buffalo Bisons. The International Association permanently folded and did not return to play in 1979.

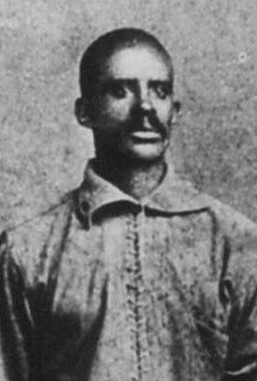
(1885) Baseball Hall of Fame member Bud Fowler. Fowler played for Lynn in 1878, breaking the color barrier in the New England League.

Baseball Hall of Fame member Bud Fowler played for the Lynn Live Oaks in 1878. On May 17, 1878, while playing for Lynn, Bud Fowler became the first Black player in to appear in a game in organized baseball. In the game, Fowler pitched for Lynn in place of an injured player and defeated the London Tecumsehs by the score of 5–0. Fowler played for Lynn until June 1, 1878, when the Lynn team merged with the Worcester team and paired its roster. Fowler went on to have a playing career that lasted over 30 years, playing through the 1909 season.

After a decade hiatus, the Lynn "Lions" resumed minor league play during the 1886 New England League season. On August 14, 1886, the Newburyport Clamdiggers moved to Lynn. The Clamdiggers had a record of 35–34 at the time of the relocation. After compiling a 20–18 record while based in Lynn, the team ended the season with an overall record of 53–52. Lynn ended the season in third place in the six-team league. The Newburyport/Lynn team was managed by Dan Shannon, Ed Flanagan and Fred Doe, as the team finished 14.5 games behind the first place Portland team. Lynn's Sam LaRocque had 134 total hits to lead the New England League, white teammates Guerdon Whiteley and Tug Wilson tied for the league lead with 11 home runs. Lynn pitcher Tom Lovett led the league with 32 wins, 300 strikeouts and a 1.27 ERA in a dominant season.

In 1887, the New England league expanded from six teams to eight-teams to begin the season, as Lynn continued play in the league. Managed by George Brackett and Henry Murphy, the Lynn Lions ended the 1887 season with a record of 40–64, placing sixth in the New England League. Lynn ended the New England League season 31.0 games behind the first place Lowell Browns in the final standings of the eight-team league, which had reduced to six teams by the end the season, leaving Lynn in last place of the remaining teams.

Shortstop Sadie Houck played for Lynn in 1887. In 1882, as a result of a decision at the National League convention, Houck had been blacklisted from organized baseball for being "addicted to drink". He was barred from playing for or against any National League teams. Houck was eventually reinstated after missing the entire 1882 season before and resuming play in 1883.

The 1888 Lynn "Shoemakers" continued New England League play to begin the season in the eight-team league, before folding during the season. On July 20, 1888, Lynn folded. The Shoemakers ended their 1888 season with a record of 37–26 as the returning George Brackett served as manager. The first place Lowell Chippies won the championship in the eight-team league. Lynn pitcher Jim Devlin led the New England League with an 1.84 ERA. The New England League folded after the 188 season and did not return to play until 1891.

The Lynn "Shoemakers" nickname for the baseball team corresponds with Lynn history and local industry in the era. Shoes were manufactured in the city beginning as early as 1683, with the shoe industry growing in the 19th century to include numerous shoe factories within the city. Lynn was known as the Shoe Capiton of the World.

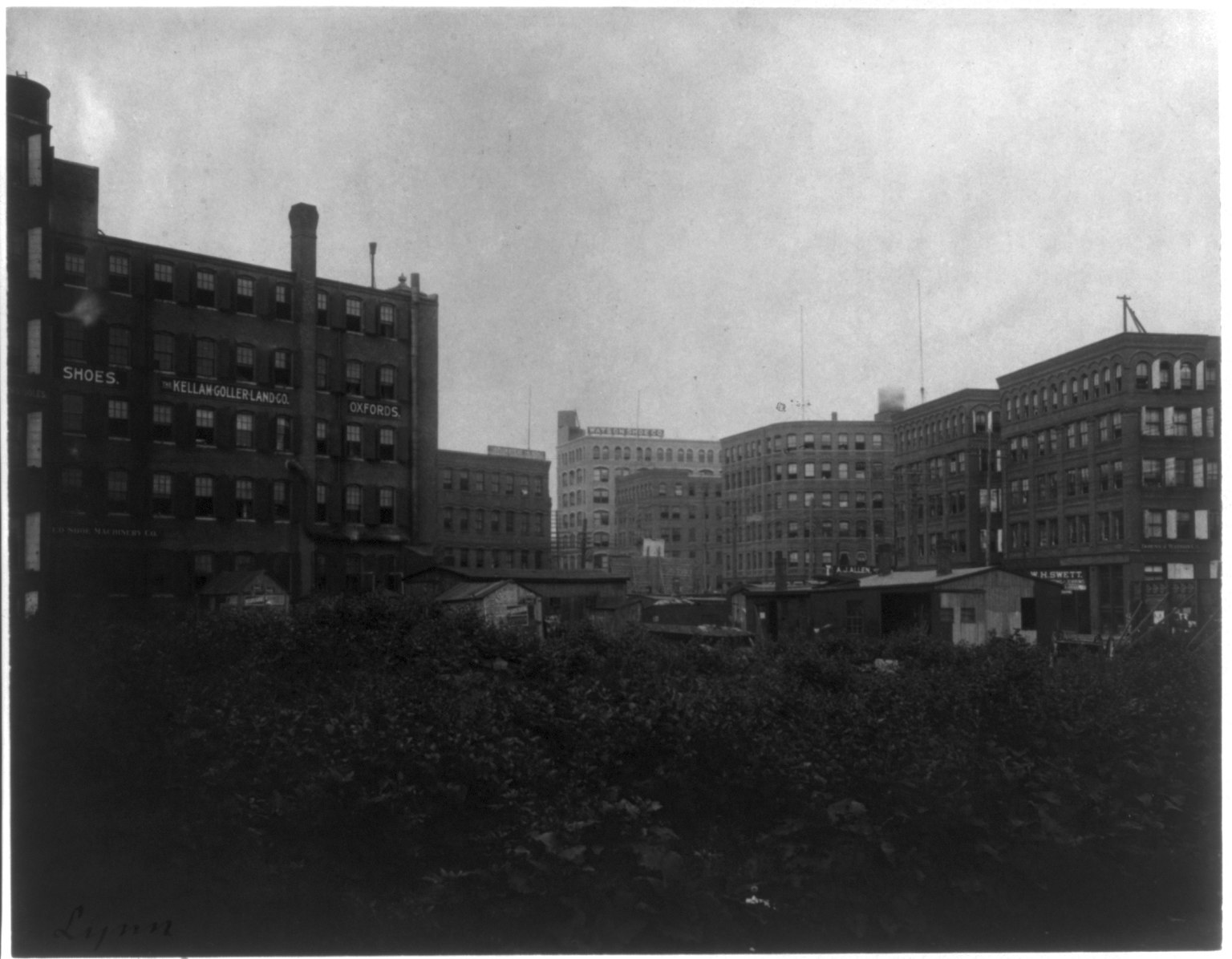
(1895) Shoe factories, Lynn, Massachusetts.

The 1891 Lynn team rejoined the eight-team Class B level New England League to begin the season. On July 20, 1891, Lynn folded. After folding, Lynn ended their season with a 18–45 record, as the eight–team league lost three teams during the season. Playing the season under managers Harry Putnam, Herbert Nichols and Charles Cook, the league was won by the first place Worcester team in the final standings.

=== 1901, 1905 to 1910 – New England League ===
The Lynn franchise returned to the reformed 1901 New England League in the middle of the season. The Augusta Live Oaks, Bangor Millionaires, Haverhill Hustlers, Lewiston, Lowell Tigers, Manchester, Nashua and Portland teams began league play on May 15, 1901.

In 1901, the Augusta Live Oaks relocated during the season as new members in the independent level New England League. On June 30, 1901, the team had a 10–23 record while playing under manager John Leighton when the franchise was relocated to Lynn, Massachusetts to become the Lynn Live Oaks. The Augusta/Lynn franchise the disbanded on July 6, 1901, finishing with a 11–25 overall record.

After a three year hiatus from minor league play, the Lynn Shoemakers rejoined the 1905 New England League and ended the season in third place. The Shoemakers ended the season with a record of 60–48, playing the season under managers Fred Lake and Frank Leonard, who began a six-year tenure as manager. Lynn ended the season finishing 9.0 games behind the first place Concord Marines in the final standings of the eight-team Class B level league, as no playoffs were held. Lynn player Clarence Lovell led the New England League with 6 home runs.

During the 1906 season, a fatal beaning occurred during a minor league game at Lynn home game. On August 9, 1906, Thomas F. Burke, the left fielder for the Lynn Shoemakers was at the plate in a game at Lynn's Ocean Park. Pitching for the visiting Fall River Indians was Joseph J. Jerger. Jerger threw a pitch that broke inside and struck Burke in the temple. Burke was immediately knocked unconscious, and he was caught by the umpire as he fell. Burke underwent surgery, but never regained consciousness and died on August 11, 1906. In the aftermath, Jerger was initially charged with manslaughter. Judge Berry of the Lynn Police Court, who had been in attendance at the game, presided over a brief hearing on August 20, 1906. Six witnesses testified on Jerger's behalf. The Boston Evening Transcript reported that Berry ruled "(Jerger) was in no way to blame for the death of Burke."

The 1906 Lynn Shoemakers continued New England League play, as the league remained a Class B level league with eight teams. The Shoemakers finished in second place as Frank Leonard continued as manager. With a 66–49 record, Lynn finished 7.5 games behind the first place Worcester Busters in the final standings. Lynn player Clarence Lovell hit 4 home runs, which tied for the league lead, while Lynn pitcher Henry Labelle won 23 games to lead the New England League.

George Barclay played for the Lynn Shoemakers in 1906 and 1907 in his final seasons of professional baseball after stints with the St. Louis Cardinals and Boston Beaneaters. Barclay also played football and is credited with inventing the first football helmet, while playing collegiately for Lafayette. Barclay invented the first-ever football helmet in 1894, in a quest to design a helmet that would prevent the development of cauliflower ears. Barclay's first helmet was constructed by a saddle-maker from Easton, Pennsylvania and gained attracted national attention when Lafayette played a game agaginst Penn on Oct. 24, 1896.

The Lynn Shoemakers were the runner up for the second consecutive season in the 1907 New England League, as Frank Leonard again managed the Shoemakers. The Shoemakers ended the 1907 season with a 61–49 record, ending the season 14.0 games behind the first place Worcester Busters, who were managed by Baseball Hall of Fame member Jesse Burkett in the Class B level league. Lynn pitcher Elmer Steele led the New England League hurlers with 24 wins.

For the 1907 season, Lynn manager Frank Leonard had signed Elmer Steele in hopes of improving the team's pitching depth. Steele proceeded to pitch to a 24–11 record on the season. Fred Lake, the former Lynn manager, now scouting for the Boston Americans recommended that Boston sign Steele to their roster after having scouted many games that Steele pitched. Boston followed Lake's recommendation and purchased the rights to Steele's contract on July 8, 1907. Steele was scheduled to report to Boston and make his major league debut after the New England League season ended on Labor Day. Steele made his first start for Boston on September 12, 1907.

The 1908 Lynn Shoemakers were managed by Frank Leonard as the team finished in sixth place in the eight-team New England League final standings. The Shoemakers had a 54–70 final record, finishing 26.0 games behind the New England League champion Worcester Busters in the final standings of the Class B level league, which held no playoffs.

Lynn hired Baseball Hall of Fame member "Sliding" Billy Hamilton to be a player/manager for the Shoemakers team for the 1909 season. After playing in the major leagues, Hamilton had previously managed the Haverhill team in the New England League. In ceremonies before the game, Hamilton raised the team flay on the opening day at Lynn in 1909.

At the conclusion of the 1909 season, the Lynn Shoemakers again placed third in the eight–team Class B level New England League. Managed during the season by Billy Hamilton, the Shoemakers ended the season with a record of 74–69. In a close race, Lynn finished 2.5 games behind the first place Worcester Busters in the final standings. Billy Hamilton won the 1909 New England League batting championship, as the player/manager hit .332 for Lynn.

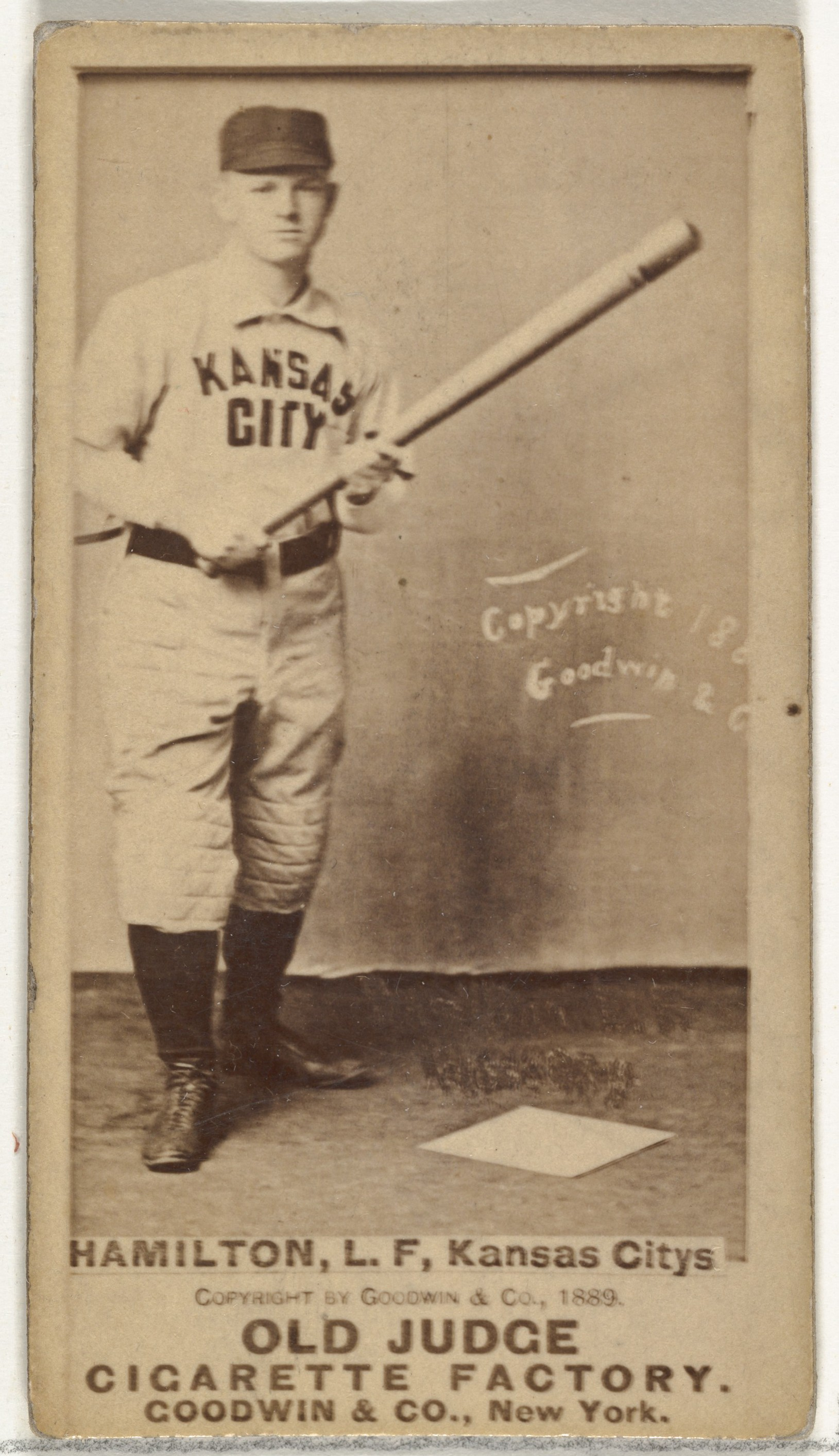
Baseball Hall of Fame member Billy Hamilton, Kansas City Cowboys. Old Judge baseball card series (N172). Hamilton served as player/maanger for Lynn in 1909 and 1910.

At age 44, Baseball Hall of Fame member Billy Hamilton continued as the player/manager for the Lynn Showmakers in 1910, in what was his final season as a professional player. Hamilton had left the major leagues in 1902 with a lifetime batting average of .344, ranking eighth all time, His on base percentage of .455 ranked fourth all time. His 914 stolen bases were the most of all time, until surpassed by Lou Brock and Rickey Henderson.

The 1910 Lynn Shoemakers finished in second place in the eight-team league, an improvement from their third-place finish in the New England League standings the previous season. The Shoemakers ended the season with a record of 68–52. In his final season as manager, Billy Hamilton led Lynn as the Shoemakers finished the season7.5 games behind the first place New Bedford Whalers in the final standings of the Class B level league. Shoemaker player Jim Wallace won the New England League batting championship, with a .312 average.

=== 1911 to 1915 – New England League ===
The 1912 season saw Frank Leonard return to the team and replace Billy Hamilton as the Lynn Manager. The team became known as the Lynn "Leonardites" in conjunction with their manager.

On May 19, 1911, Len Swormstedt pitched an 11-inning complete game over the Fall River Brienies in a 2-1 victory for Lynn.

The next day, on May 20, 1911, the game between Lynn and the Fall River Brienies had a weather affected outcome. Playing at Ocean Park in Lynn, the conditions were foggy, as fog rolled in from over the ocean. In the seventh inning, Lynn was leading by one run when Buck Weaver of Fall River hit a ball that disappeared into the fog, Weaver circled the bases with a three-run home run while the outfielders unsuccessfully searched for the ball in the fog. Lynn manager Frank Leonard argued that the game should be called because of the foggy conditions. The umpires agreed. However, they reverted to the end of the previous inning, wiping out the home run by Weaver and awarded Lynn a one run victory.

Continuing the Lynn tenure in the Class B level New England League, the 1911 Lynn Leonardites placed sixth in the league standings in their first season known as the "Leonardites" in recognition of their manager Frank Leonard. The Leonardites ended the season with a record of 60–60 in the eight-team league. Lynn finished 15.5 games behind of the first place Lowell Tigers, as the league held no playoffs.

During the 1912 season, player Bill Cooney had four transactions in the New England League that included a stop in Lynn. Playing as both a position player and a pitcher, Cooney started the 1912 season under contract with the Lowell Grays, but he held out in demanding a pay increase. In late April, he ended his holdout and began play with Lowell. On June 11, he was traded to the Haverhill Hustlers for Ed MacGamwell. After a pitching performance with Haverhill left him injured, Cooney was sold to Lynn on August 8, 1912, who planned to play him at shortstop. After he played badly at shortstop, Cooney was sent by Lynn back to Haverhill on August 21. 1912. He finished the season playing as Haverhill's right fielder.

The 1912 Lynn Leonardites finished the New England League season in fourth place, playing under managers Frank Leonard and Terry McGovern. The Leonardites ended the season with a 63–62 record and finished 14.0 games behind the first place Lawrence Barristers in the league standings, as the Class B level league held no playoffs.

During the offseason before the 1913 season, Lynn hired a new manager to replace Frank Leonard. On November 1, 1912, with his pitching career waning due to an injured arm, Patsy Flaherty was hired to manage Lynn in the 1913 New England League. Flaherty would hold the manager post for Lynn until July 1914, when he resigned to become a scout for the Boston Red Sox.

The Lynn team was again known as the "Showmakers," continuing play in the 1913 eight-team New England League and finishing the season in fifth place. Patsy Flaherty was the Lynn manager as no playoffs were held. The Shoemakers ended the season with a 61–60 record and finished 17.5 games behind the first place Lowell Grays in the final standings. The second place Portland Duffs team was managed by Baseball Hall of Fame member Hugh Duffy and opened a new ballpark in 1913. The third place Worcester Busters, were managed by another Baseball Hall of Fame member, Jesse Burkett. Catcher George Wilson of Lynn led the New England League hitting, with a .365 average.

In 1913, Lynn player George Wilson lead the New England League with his .365 average, playing in a full 122-game season. Wilson also hit nine home runs and also led the league in stolen bases. Wilson's strong 1913 season led to him to being signed by the Boston Red Sox for 1914. During the winter, Wilson taught high school mathematics at Reading High School, located just outside Boston.

For the 1914 season, Arlie Latham was hired to be a coach for Lynn, working under returning manager Patrick "Patsy" Flaherty, as the Lynn "Fighters" continued play in the New England League. In June 1914, Latham was released after he run afoul of the entire Lynn team. The Associated Press reported that Latham was forced to resign because the Lynn "Players thought he was after manager Flaherty's job and threatened to go on strike unless he was dismissed." Latham then finished the 1914 season working as an umpire in the Colonial League after his tenure with Lynn.

Playing the 1914 New England League season, known as the Lynn "Fighters," Lynn ended the season in fourth place. During the season, manager Patsy Flaherty left Lynn in Lynn in July, resigning his post to become a minor league scout for the American League's Boston Red Sox. The Lynn Fighters had a 60–62 record to finish in fourth place in the Class B New England League's final standings. In the eight-team league, Lynn finished 23.5 games behind the first place Lawrence Barristers.

On February 10, 1915, Louis Pieper was announced as the Lynn manager for the 1915 season. Piper had previously coached Lawrence in New England League play. Newspapers called the team "Pipers Pirates." The Lynn "Pirates" returned to New England League play in 1915, continuing in the Class B level, eight-team league. The Pirates ended the season in third place in the eight-team league. Lynn ended the season with a record of 62–57. In the New England League standings, the Pirates finished 15.0 games behind the first place Portland Duffs, who were managed by Baseball Hall of Fame member Hugh Duffy. After the 1915 season, the Class B level New England League folded.

=== 1916 – Eastern League ===
After the New England folded, the Lynn "Pipers" immediately became members of the ten-team, Class B level Eastern League in 1916. The Bridgeport Hustlers, Hartford Senators, Lawrence Barristers, Lowell Grays, New Haven Merlins, New London Planters, Portland Duffs, Springfield Ponies and Worcester Busters teams joined Lynn in the newly formed league, which evolved from the folded New England League. The Eastern League began play on April 20, 1916.

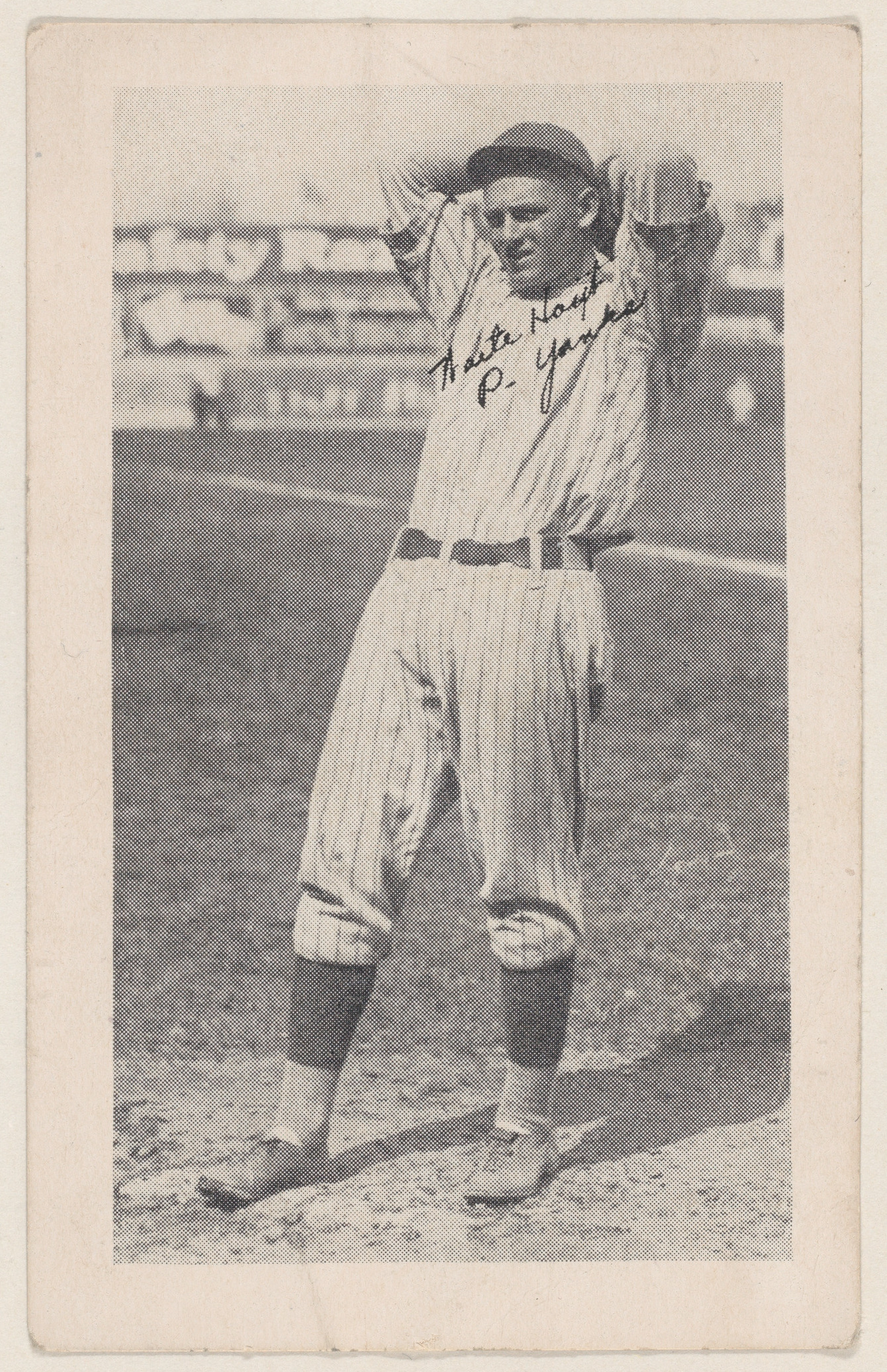
(1921) Baseball Hall of Fame member Waite Hoyt, New York Yankees. In 1916, Hoyt pitched for Lynn in his first professional season at age 16.

Baseball Hall of Fame pitcher Waite Hoyt played for the 1916 Lynn Pipers in his first professional season at age 16. At age 15, the New York Giants had signed Hoyt to a contract in the winter of 1915 and he began his professional career in 1916, His father had initially refused to co-sign his professional contract. After beginning the 1916 season with the Penn State League Lebanon team in May, the league folded shortly after. Hoyt was then sent to Lynn. While pitching for Lynn in 1916, Hoyt was unable to pitch for two months due to blood poisoning in his hands. After his lengthy and successful pitching career, Hoyt was elected into the Baseball Hall of Fame in 1969.

Pipers player Billy Gleason was drafted in the 1916 Rule 5 draft by the Pittsburgh Pirates and made his major league debut with Pittsburgh on September 25, 1916.

Lynn was nicknamed the "Pipers" after their returning manager Louis Pieper. In Eastern League play, Lynn ended the 1916 season with a record of 66–57, placing fourth in the final league standings. The Lynn franchise did not return to the 1917 Eastern League, which reduced to an eight=team league, as the Lowell Grays and Lynn franchises folded. Pitcher Oscar Tuero of Lynn led the Eastern League with 22 wins, while pitching 301 innings. The Lynn franchise did not return to the Eastern League in 1917, as the league reduced to eight teams.

Lynn next hosted minor league baseball in 1926, when the New England League reformed as a Class B level league with eight teams. The Lynn Papooses were a member of the newly formed league, beginning another tenure of a Lynn franchise playing in the league. Lynn joined the Haverhill Hillies, Lawrence Merry Macks, Lewiston Twins, Lowell Highwaymen, Manchester Blue Sox, Nashua Millionaires and Portland Eskimos teams in beginning play for the reformed league on May 11, 1926.

== The ballparks ==
Early Lynn minor league teams hosted home games at the West Lynn Grounds.

In the minor league seasons from 1887 to 1901. Lynn played home minor league games as Glenmere Park. The 13-acre park was at first a bicycle park. In 1887, a baseball field was built in the center of the bicycle loop. The property site was later sold and became residential.

Beginning in 1905, Lynn hosted home minor league games at Ocean Park through 1916. The ballpark was located on the coast of the Atlantic Ocean. Today, the ballpark site is residential.

== Timeline ==
Year(s)	# Yrs.	Team	League	Level	Ballpark
1877	1	Lynn Live Oaks	New England Association	Independent	West Lynn Grounds
1878	1	Lynn Live Oaks	International Association	Independent	West Lynn Grounds
1886–1887	2	Lynn Lions	New England League	Independent	Glenmere Park
1888	1	Lynn Shoemakers	New England League	Independent	Glenmere Park
1891	1	Lynn	New England League	Class B	Glenmere Park
1901	1	Lynn Live Oaks	New England League	Independent	Glenmere Park
1905–1910	6	Lynn Shoemakers	New England League	Class B	Ocean Park
1911–1912	2	Lynn Leonardites	New England League	Class B	Ocean Park
1913	1	Lynn Shoemakers	New England League	Class B	Ocean Park
1914	1	Lynn Fighters	New England League	Class B	Ocean Park
1915	1	Lynn Pirates	New England League	Class B	Ocean Park
1916	1	Lynn Pipers	Eastern League	Class B	Ocean Park

== Year–by–year records ==
Year	Record	Place	Manager	Playoffs/notes
1877	8–22	NA	Candy Cummings	Team folded 1–9 in International Association games
1878	9–26	NA	George Brackett	International Association play Team merged with Worcester June 1
1886	53–52	3rd	Dan Shannon / Ed Flanagan / Fred Doe	Newburyport (35–34) moved to Lynn August 14.
1887	40–64	6th	George Brackett / Henry Murphy	No playoffs held
1888	37–26	NA	George Brackett	Team folded July 20
1891	18–45	NA	Harry Putnam / Herbert Nichols / Charles Cook	Team folded July 20
1901	11–25	NA	John Leighton	Augusta (10–23) moved to Lynn June 30; Team disbanded July 6.
1905	60–48	3rd	Fred Lake / Frank Leonard	No playoffs held
1906	66–48	2nd	Frank Leonard	No playoffs held
1907	61–49	2nd	Frank Leonard	No playoffs held
1908	54–70	5th	Frank Leonard	No playoffs held
1909	74–49	3rd	Billy Hamilton	No playoffs held
1910	68–52	2nd	Billy Hamilton	No playoffs held
1911	60–60	6th	Frank Leonard	No playoffs held
1912	63–62	4th	Terry McGovern / Frank Leonard	No playoffs held
1913	61–60	5th	Patsy Flaherty	No playoffs held
1914	60–62	4th	Patsy Flaherty / Ralph Reeve	No playoffs held
1915	62–57	3rd	Louis Pieper	Did not qualify
1916	66–57	4th	Louis Pieper	No playoffs held

== Notable alumni ==
- Candy Cummings (1877, MGR) Inducted Baseball Hall of Fame, 1939
- Bud Fowler (1878) Inducted Baseball Hall of Fame, 2023
- Billy Hamilton (1909–1910, MGR) Inducted Baseball Hall of Fame, 1961
- Waite Hoyt (1916) Inducted Baseball Hall of Fame, 1969
- George Adams (1877)
- Jack Allen (1877)
- Chick Autry (1909)
- Jim Ball (1907)
- Jimmy Bannon (1891, 1909)
- Tom Bannon (1891, 1906–1907)
- George Barclay (1906–1907)
- Frank Beck (1886)
- Ed Beecher (1886))
- Joe Battin (1877–1878, 1901)
- Bob Black (1888)
- Dick Blaisdell (1884)
- John Buckley (1901)
- Hugh Canavan (1916)
- Roger Carey (1887)
- Ed Caskin (1886, 1891)
- Roscoe Coughlin (1887)
- Bill Collins (1888)
- Frank Connaughton (1907)
- Jim Connor (1908)
- Bill Cooney (1907, 1911–1912)
- Jack Corcoran (1891)
- Tommy Corcoran (1887)
- Roscoe Coughlin (1887)
- Sam Crand (1887)
- Mike Cunningham (1913–1914)
- Jud Daley (1916)
- Bill Dam (1910)
- John Deering (1906)
- Fred Demarais (1887–1888)
- Jim Devlin (1887)
- Fred Doe (1886, MGR; 1891))
- James Donnelly (1884)
- Jerry Donovan (1906)
- Conny Doyle (1888)
- Jack Doyle (1888)
- Rich Durning (1914–1915)
- Steve Dunn (1887)
- Bill Fagan (1887)
- Howard Fahey (1914)
- Joe Farrell (1887)
- Alex Ferson (1888)
- Pembroke Finlayson (1907)
- John Fitzgerald (1887)
- Patsy Flaherty (1914–1915, MGR)
- Ed Flanagan (1886, MGR)
- John Gaffney (1877)
- Larry Gardner (1908) Boston Red Sox Hall of Fame
- Whitey Gibson (1887)
- Patrick Gillespie (1878)
- Barney Gilligan (1888, 1891)
- Charlie Girard (1909)
- Billy Gleason (1915–1916)
- Eddie Grant (1907)
- Henry Gruber (1886, 1891)
- Andy Harrington (1913)
- Thorny Hawkes (1877)
- George Henry (1887)
- Mike Hines (1891)
- Jack Hoey (1915)
- Sadie Houck (1887)
- Merwin Jacobson (1913)
- Tom Keady (1907)
- Fred Lake (1905, MGR)
- Sam LaRocque (1886, 1888)
- Art LaVigne (1913)
- Jack Leary (1877)
- John Leighton (1901, MGR))
- Frank Leonard (1905–1908, 1911–1912, MGR)
- Tom Lovett (1886)
- Henry Lynch (1887–1888)
- Bunny Madden (1906)
- Dick McCabe (1915–1916)
- Bill McCaffrey (1887)
- Jack McCarthy (1891)
- Bill McCorry (1910)
- Art McGovern (1911–1912)
- Frank McLaughlin (1891)
- Doc McMahon (1909)
- Charlie Mason (1877)
- Bobby Mathews (1878)
- Ray Miller (1906)
- Allie Moulton (1913–1915)
- Mike Muldoon (1877–1878, 1901)
- Simmy Murch (1911–1912)
- John Murphy (1905)
- Mike Murphy (1914)
- Tony Murphy (1886–1887)
- Billy Murray (1887)
- Tom Niland (1891, 1906)
- John O'Connell (1891)
- Andy O'Connor (1910)
- Hal O'Hagan (1908)
- Dan O'Leary (1878)
- Patsy O'Rourke (1909)
- Henry Oxley (1884)
- Elias Peak (1886, 1891)
- Marr Phillips (1878)
- Dave Pickett (1906)
- Irv Porter (1913–1916)
- Nate Pulsifer (1908)
- Charlie Reilley (1877)
- Charlie Reipschlager (1878)
- Jim Rogers (1891)
- Lou Say (1877–1878, 1901)
- Dan Shannon (1886, MGR; 1891)
- Frank Shannon (1908)
- Fred Siefke (1891)
- Elmer Steele (1905–1913)
- Bill Smiley (1878)
- Harry Spence (1878)
- Charlie Sprague (1887)
- Elmer Steele (1907)
- Fred Stem (1909)
- Larry Strands (1911–1913)
- Sleeper Sullivan (1877–1878, 1891, 1901)
- Jerry Sweeney (1887)
- Len Swormstedt (1910–1911)
- Walt Thomas (1909)
- Bill Tierney (1877)
- Tom Tuckey (1909)
- Oscar Tuero (1916)
- Bob Vail (1906–1907)
- Jim Wallace (1908–1912)
- Red Waller (1911–1912)
- Bert Weeden (1909, 1912)
- Guerdon Whiteley (1886, 1891)
- George F. Wilson (1911–1912, 1914)
- Tug Wilson (1886, 1891)
- George Wood (1878)
- Willis Wyman (1891)
- Bill Zimmerman (1909)

== See also ==
- Lynn Shoemakers players
- Lynn Live Oaks players
- Lynn Leonardites players
- Lynn Fighters players
- Lynn Pirates players
- Lynn Pipers players
- Lynn Lions players
- Lynn (minor league baseball) players
