= Nashua Millionaires =

- 1926–1933; (1901–1905, 1926–1927, 1929–1930, 1933); Nashua, New Hampshire

Minor league affiliations
- Class: Independent (1901); Class B (1902–1905, 1926–1927, 1929–1930, 1933)
- League: New England League (1901–1905, 1926–1927, 1929–1930, 1933)

Major league affiliations
- Team: Detroit Tigers (1933)

Minor league titles
- League titles (0): None
- Wild card berths (0): None

Team data
- Name: Nashua (1901–1905); Nashua Millionaires (1926–1927, 1929–1930, 1933)
- Ballpark: Lawndale Park (1901–1905, 1926–1927, 1929–1930, 1933)

The Nashua Millionaires were a minor league baseball team based in Nashua, New Hampshire. Between 1926 and 1933, the Millionaires played as members of the Class B level New England League. The Millionaires were preceded in New England League play by the "Nashua" teams of 1901 to 1905.

The "Millionaires" were so named because of, according to The Boston Globe, the "lavish manner" in which franchise ownership supported the team.

The Nashua Millionaires and earlier Nashua teams of the New England League hosted all home minor league games at Nashua's Lawndale Park.

In 1933, their final season of play with that nickname, the Millionaires were a minor league affiliate of the Detroit Tigers. Nashua next hosted minor league baseball in 1946, when the New England League reformed with the Nashua Dodgers as a member.

== History ==
=== Early Nashua teams ===
Nashua began minor league play in 1885 when the "Nashua" team played as members of the independent New Hampshire State League. Nashua continued play in the New Hampshire State League in 1886.

In 1895, Nashua joined the eight–team Independent level New England Association. The New England Association reformed as a six–team independent league with the Nashua "Rainmakers" as a member. The other league members were the Fitchburg, Haverhill, Lawrence Indians, Lowell Ladies Men and Salem teams. On May 3, 1895, in a game at Nashua, Lawrence defeated Nashua 36–17.

The New England Association permanently disbanded on July 8, 1895, when the league folded with the Lawrence Indians in first place. In the shortened season, Lawrence won the New England Association championship with a 33–19 record, followed by the Nashua Rainmakers (27–21), Lowell (24–24) and Salem/Haverhill (20–28). Nashua hosted home games at Kinsley Park in 1895.

=== New England League 1901 to 1905 ===
Nashua resumed minor league play in 1901, with the team becoming members of the New England League. The Augusta Live Oaks, Bangor Millionaires, Haverhill Hustlers, Lewiston, Lowell Tigers, Manchester, Nashua and Portland teams began league play on May 15, 1901.

Nashua began play in the 1901 New England League under manager Henry Burns. The Nashua team had a final record of 39–49 to place sixth in the final standings of the eight-team independent New England League, which held no playoffs in the era. Nashua ended the season 14.0 games behind the first place Portland team in the standings. The Bangor and Augusta teams both relocated during the New England League season only to fold together on July 5, 1901. This left Nashua to end the season in last place in the final standings, finishing in sixth place of the six remaining teams.

Nashua continued play in the 1902 New England League and an ugly event occurred at Nashua during the 1902 season. On July 14, 1902, umpire Gaffney was working his first New England League game as Nashua played Lowell at Nashua. Games in the era often had only one umpire. After a series of events, Gaffney left the ballpark in the fifth inning. During an argument with the umpire, over a disputed fair or foul home run that Gaffney ruled as a fair ball, Nashua pitcher Jack Miran punched Gaffney in the face. Many of the 500 fans in attendance at Lawndale Park mobbed Gaffney, who required a police escort to leave the field. Lowell manager Fred Lake changed Gaffney's call to a foul ball, taking away his team's home run. Each team provided a player to umpire the for remainder of the game in which Nashua eventually lost to Lowell by the score of 7-1.

Ike Van Zandt had a whirlwind season in 1902. On June 2, 1902, Ike Van Zandt, who had just returned to play for Nashua after a suspension was fined $100 and suspended by the team for "instigating a rebellion" The Portsmouth Herald, reported that Van Zandt had "led a 'strike' the day before and came near getting three others to join. As it was, the play of the team was so loose that the game was lost when it ought to have been won...He and McManus (also suspended) were outfielders and they seldom made an error." After hitting .242 in 22 games for Nashua, Van Zandt was briefly sent to join the semipro Woonsocket Gyms. In late July 1902, after returning to the team, Van Zandt decided to retire from baseball and he left the Nashua team, returned to his family in New York and began working as a carpenter. A week or two later Van Zandt returned, rejoined the Nashua team and became the team captain. He briefly served as the Nashua manager. Van Zandt played in 76 total games for Nashua, posting a .367 batting average and a had 1-2 record as manager. On September 7, 1902, Van Zandt was sent by Nashua to Worcester Hustlers of the Eastern League for the remainder of the season, where he replaced Worcester outfielder Jimmy Sebring, after Sebring was called up to the major leagues by the Pittsburgh Pirates.

In 1902, Nashua continued play as members of the eight team, Class B level New England League, as the league received a class level. Playing home games at Landale Park, the Nashua team ended the season in sixth place in the 1902 New England League standings. Nashua finished with a record of 46–66, as Henry Burns returned as manager. The Nashua team finished 29.0 games behind first place Manchester and finished ahead of only the Fall River Indians in league play.

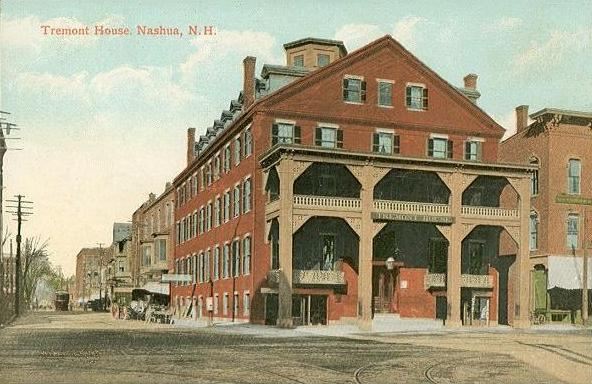
(1908) Tremont House, Nashua, New Hampshire. Nashua hosted an end of season players banquet at the hotel in September 1902.

In 1902, Garry Wilson signed with Nashua in late May. With Nashua, Wilson had a .259 batting average in 98 games, playing second base. After Nashua's season ended, the team held a banquet on September 11, 1902, at the Tremont House Hotel in Nashua. After the banquet that evening, Wilson was signed by the Boston Americans for the remainder of the season and soon joined the team. Wilson major league debut with playing for Boston on September 27, 1902. During the 1902 season, Wilson and his Nashua teammate Ike Van Zandt partnered together to open a pool hall in Nashua.

In 1903, the Nashua team continued league play as members of the eight–team Class B level New England League. Nahusa joined the Brockton Shoemakers, Concord Marines, Fall River Indians, Haverhill Hustlers, Lawrence Colts, Lowell Tigers and Manchester teams in league play.

After their last place finish the season before, Nashua improved to place second in the 1903 New England League standings. With a 68–46 record, Nashua finished 4.5 games behind the first place Lowell Tigers in the final standings. Ed Ashenbach, Chub Collins and Tommy Dowd served as the managers as Nashua continued play in the eight–team Class B league.

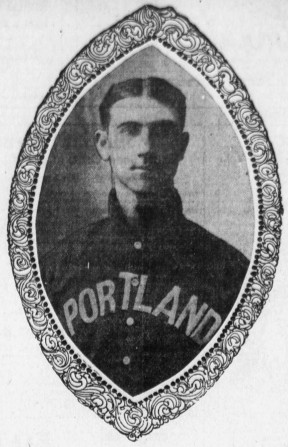
(1905) Larry McLean, Portland. McLean had a lengthy major league career after playing for Nashua in 1903. He was shot to death in 1921.

Catcher Larry McLean played for Nashua in 1903 before ending the 1903 season with the Chicago Cubs. On December 12, 1903, McLean was traded from the Cubs to the St. Louis Cardinals in what was described as "one of the worst trades in St. Louis Cardinals history." McLean and Jack Taylor were traded to the by the Cubs to the Cardinals in exchange for future Baseball Hall of Fame member Mordecai Brown and Jack O'Neill.

McLean was said to regularly chew large amounts of Brown's Mule Chewing tobacco and drink heavily. Usually drinking corn whiskey, McLean and had a penchant for confrontational behavior. In his thirteen-year major career, the 6'5" tall McLean played in 862 games. His major league career ended in 1915 following a physical fight that involved New York Giants manager John McGraw and Giants scout Dick Kinsella in a hotel lobby. After having been suspended for ten days by McGraw for not being in condition to play, McLean and entered the lobby of the team's hotel with an entourage of other men and the group first attacked Kinsella, who broke a chair over McLean's head in the melee. McLean's group eventually fled away from the scene in a car. John McGraw immediately dismissed McLean from the team that day and he never played for another major league team. Six years later in 1921, McLean was shot and killed at age 39. McLean was shot by the manager of a saloon in Boston the day after a McLean had had an altercation in the same bar. The saloon manager, James J. Connor, was arrested on suspicion of murder and Connor was later sentenced to serve one year in prison.

In the 1903 season, Moonlight Graham played for Nashua and also the league champion Lowell Tigers teams in the New England League. With a short major league baseball career, Moonlight Graham later became the basis of the character of his same name in the baseball movie Field of Dreams Author W.P. Kinsella had first discovered Graham's name and statistical information in The Baseball Encyclopedia and noticed that Graham played just one major league game with 0 at-bats. Kinsella's research revealed that Graham become a physician after his baseball career ended. Kinsella based Graham's story on the character in his novel Shoeless Joe. In 1989, Kinsella's novel was adapted into the motion picture Field of Dreams. In the 1903 season, Moonlight Graham hit .240 with seven triples, while playing in 89 games between Nashua and Lowell.

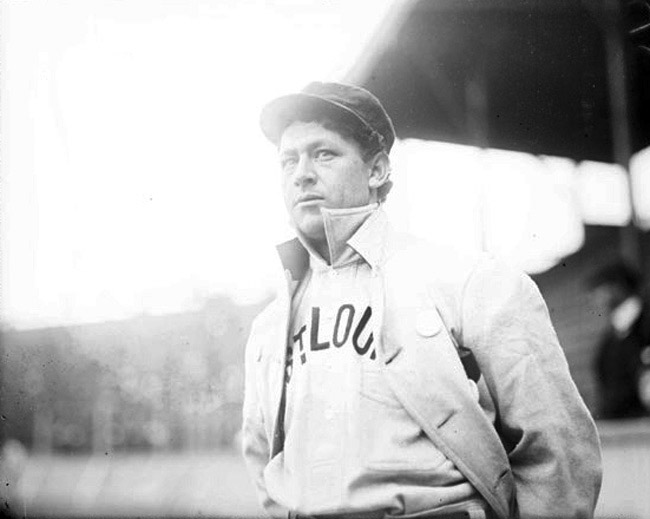
(1904) Ike Van Zandt, St. Louis Browns. Van Zandt played for Nashua from 1902 to 1904 with numerous controversies surrounding him.

Pitcher Ed Pinnance played for Nashua in 1904 after making history the previous season. In 1903, while pitching for the Philadelphia Athletics, Pinnance had become the first full-blooded American Indian to play in a regular season game in the major leagues. Pinnacle made his major league debut on September 14, 1903, pitching for the Philadelphia Athletics against the Senators.

The 1904 Nashua team ended the New England League season in a tie for fifth place in the final league standings. With an overall record of 62–62, Nashua finished 20.5 games behind the first place Lowell Tigers in the final standings and ended the season in a direct tie with the Concord Marines. Concord ended their season with an identical record to Nashua at 62–62. Jack Carney and Sid Rollins served as the managers in leading Nashua in the New England League season. Nashua player Ike Van Zandt led the New England with seven home runs.

Ike Van Zandt returned to Nashua in 1904, playing his third season with the team. In July 1904, Nashua manager Jack Carney received offers for Van Zandt from Frank Selee of the Chicago Cubs, Connie Mack of the Philadelphia Athletics and Hugh Duffy of the Philadelphia Phillies. In mid-August van Zandt joined the Chicago Cubs briefly before returning to Nashua after Selee didn't take Van Zandt back to Chicago after a road trip. In early September, Connie Mack had made a transaction to acquire Van Zandt for Philadelphia, but Van Zandt refused to join the A's demanding a portion of the financial agreement between the two teams for himself. On September 8, 1904, Nashua suspended Van Zandt as Mack waived his claim to the player. Van Zandt was eventually reinstated by Nashua who promptly sold his contract to the St. Louis Browns. Van Zandt batted .311 in 119 games for Nashua in 1904, while leading the league in home runs.

The 1905 New England League standings saw the Nashua finish in seventh place in the eight-team league. Nashua ended the season with a record of 41–66, finishing 27.5 games behind the first place Concord Marines, who had a 69–39 record. Stephen Flanagan managed the Nashua in the final season of Nashua's initial tenure as members of the New England League.

Nashua did not return to the 1906 New England league, which continued play as an eight-team league. Nashua and the Concord Marines were replaced in league play by the Worcester Hustlers and Manchester Textiles teams. Stephen Flanagan managed the Manchester Textiles team in 1906.

=== New England League 1926–1927, 1929–1930, 1933 ===
The Nashua "Millionaires" team played the 1925 season as members of the semi-professional Boston Twilight League. Tom Whelan was the player/manager as the Millionaires won the league championship. In 1926, the New England League would reform as a minor league. For the 1926 season Whelan was hired to manage the Lowell Highwaymen team in the newly reformed league, but he had to resign as minor league baseball banned him for the season for having used a banned player while managing at Nashua in 1925.

Pitcher Carl Ray continued play for Nashua in 1926 after having played for the Nashua Millionaires semi-pro team in 1925. Ray threw a no-hitter for Nashua against Jeff Tesreau and the Lynn Shoemakers team on July 3, 1925, winning the pitcher's duel with Tesreau by the score of 1-0. Nahusa native Ray Dobens played for the 1925 semi-professional Nashua Millionaires in the summer while still a student playing baseball at Holy Cross. Dobens would later serve as the general manager of the Nashua Dodgers beginning in 1946.

Nashua resumed minor league play in 1926 when the New England League reformed as a Class B level league, after having folded in 1919. On May 11, 1926, the Haverhill Hillies, Lawrence Merry Macks, Lewiston Twins, Lowell Highwaymen, Lynn Papooses, Manchester Blue Sox and Portland Eskimos teams joined the Nashua Millionaires in beginning league play.

The "Millionaires" nickname for the Nashua team, The Boston Globe said was due to the "lavish manner in which they were supported by the owners."

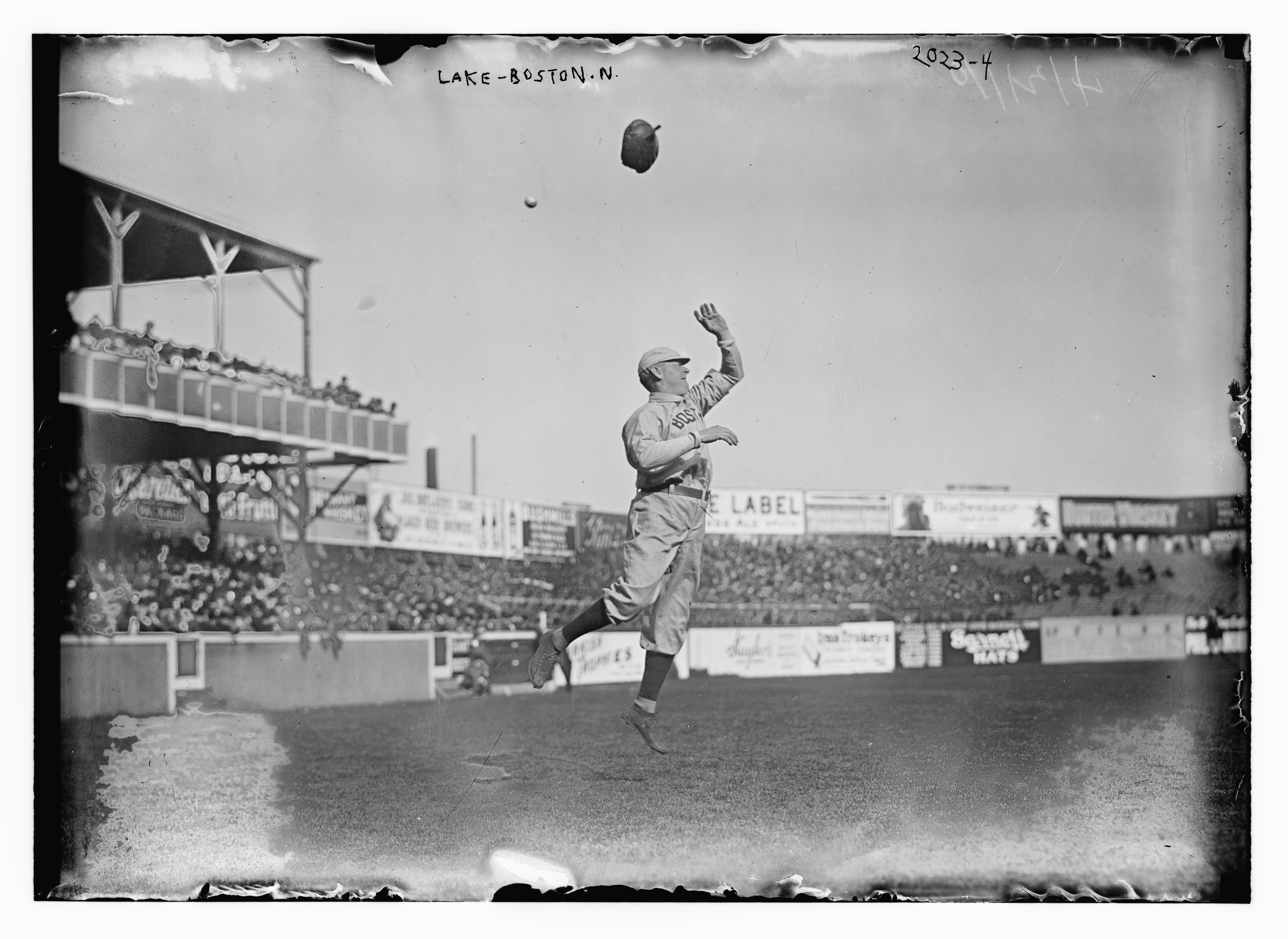
(1910) Fred Lake, Boston, NL. Lake was the owner and manager of the Nashua Millionaires in 1926.

In 1926, at age 61, Fred Lake returned to baseball as the owner/manager. Lake had owned and managed the Lowell Tigers in the New England League decades earlier before becoming a scout for the Boston Red Sox. Lake is credited for discovering future Boston Red Sox' Baseball Hall of Fame player Tris Speaker as well as Smokey Joe Wood, Harry Hooper and Bill Carrigan in his time as a Boston scout. Shortly after the 1926 season began, Lakee stepped down as the Nashua manager and turned over the team to Walter "Chick" Keating, while remaining with the Millionaires franchise as vice-president and a scout for the team.

The Nashua "Millionaires finished in last place in 1926, returning to New England League play. With a 37–56 record, Fred Lake, Chick Keating, Sandy McGregor and Johnny Mitchell managed the Millionaires during their last place season. The Millionaires placed eighth in the final standings, finishing 20.5 games behind the first place Manchester Blue Sox in the eight-team league.

Having played for the Millionaires team in 1925, Carl Ray returned to play for Nashua in 1926 after being released by both the Indianapolis Indians of the American Association in May 1926 and the Hartford Senators of the Eastern League.

Right-handed pitcher Lou Polli played for Nashua in 1926 at age 24. New York Yankees scout Ben Houser, who had managed Polli with the semi-professional Old Town, Maine team of the Boston Twilight League was impressed by Polli's pitches. Polli threw a curve ball, a sinker, a knuckleball and a screwball to go along with his fastball estimated at above 90 mph. Houser recommended Polli to Nashua, who signed him to a contract. Polli eventually became the first major league player born in Italy in 1932 and is one of seven Italian-born players to play in major league baseball. Polli compiled 236 wins in his lengthy minor league pitching career, spanning 22 seasons. In 1945, Polli threw a no hitter in his final appearance in minor league game.

In 1926 Clyde Sukeforth went to spring training with the Cincinnati Reds. After the spring ended, Sukeforth played for the Nashua Millionaires of the Class B New England League, before Reds recalled him in late May, where he made his big-league debut on May 31, 1926. After appearing in four games for the Minneapolis Millers of the American Association, Sukeforth spent the rest of 1926 with the Manchester Blue Sox before making the Reds roster in 1927. Sukeforth later became a minor league manager, a major league coach and a scout after his playing career. Sukeforth is known for scouting and signing both Jackie Robinson and Roberto Clemente. Due to a suspension of manager Leo Durocher, Sukeforth served as the interim manager for the Brooklyn Dodgers in 1947, managing the Dodgers to wins in the first two games of the season, which included Sukeforth making our the lineup card for Robinson's major league debut on April 15, 1947.

On July 21, 1972, Jackie Robinson wrote a letter to Sukeforth that is now preserved at the Baseball Hall of Fame. "Please understand that I do not have any reservations in praise for the role that Clyde Sukeforth played in the growth and development of my beginnings in baseball. I have been very appreciative of the fact that whenever there were problems in the earlier days, I could always go to you, talk with you, and receive the warm and friendly advise that I always did," the letter said in part.

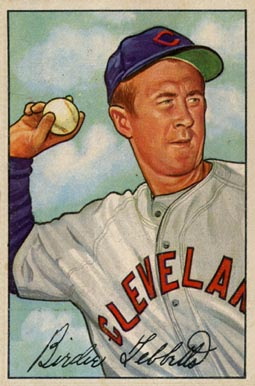
(1952) Birdie Tebbetts, Bowman baseball card. A major league All-Star catcher, Tebbetts was the Nashua Millionaires mascot as a youth.

Future major league All-Star Birdie Tebbetts was a native of Nashua, graduating from Nashua High School where he was an All-State athlete as a football quarterback and as a baseball catcher. After graduating from high school, Tebbetts signed a contract with the Detroit Tigers after they agreed to pay his college tuition. He attended Providence College where he became an All-American in baseball and graduated in 1934. When Birdie was eight years old, he met Francis P. Murphy, owner of Nashua's J.F. McElwain Company, who later became the governor of New Hampshire beginning in 1937. Murphy sponsored the Nashua Millionaires and encouraged Tebbetts in his baseball pursuits. Birdie Tebbetts eventually served as the Millionaire's team mascot. His time as the mascot for the Millionaires was responsible for Tebbetts becoming a catcher, as his idol on the team was Clyde Sukeforth.

In 1927, the Nashua Millionaires continued New England League play and improved to a third-place finish, led by manager Bill Stewart. Nashua ended the regular season with a record of 47–43, placing third in the New England League. The Millionaires finished 12.5 games behind the first place Lynn Papooses in the final regular season standings. Nashua did not qualify for the playoff won by Lynn over Portland. The Nashua Millionaires folded after the 1927 season. Nashua's Bill Scholz led the New England League with 73 RBI.

Nashua Manager Bill Stewart served as an ice hockey official and coach during his baseball playing career and had just served as an ice hockey referee for the Canadian-American Hockey League when he was hired as the manager in Nashua in 1927. He had a storied career in both sports. Following his season in Nashua, Stewart remained in baseball and became an umpire, while also forging a hockey career. In 1931, Stewart became a full-time referee in the National Hockey League before leaving his referee position to become coach of the Chicago Blackhawks in 1937 and leading the Blackhawks to the Stanley Cup championship in his first season before being fired in his second season. He returned to hockey officiating and served in the NHL until 1941. Stewart was simultaneously an umpire in the National League from 1933 to 1954. Stewart was an umpire in four World Series (1937, 1943, 1948 and 1953 World Series). He also umpired in four All-Star Games, the (1936, 1940, 1948 and 1954 All Star Games), working behind the plate in the 1954 game. Bill Stewart was the home plate umpire for Johnny Vander Meer's second consecutive no-hitter in 1938, and served as the crew chief for the 1951 three-game pennant playoff series between the New York Giants and the Brooklyn Dodgers. In 1957, Stewart returned to hockey was named coach of the U.S. men's national hockey team leading the team to a record of 23–3–1. Stewart was elected to the US Hockey Hall of Fame in 1982 and his grandson Paul Stewart later became an NHL official. Today, Bill Stewart's whiskbroom is currently in the collection at the Baseball Hall of Fame.

The Nashua Millionaires did not return to the 1928 New England League, being replaced in the eight-team league by the Attleboro Burros franchise.

As the New England League continued play in 1929, the Nashua Millionaires rejoined the eight-team Class B level league during the season. The Nashua Millionaires membership in the league was brief. After beginning the season as members, on June 19, 1929, the Lowell Millers franchise relocated to become the Nashua Millionaires. The Millers had a record of 13-22 at the time of the move. After compiling a 28–47 record in while based Nashua, the team ended the season with an overall record of 41–69. The Lowell/Nashua team ended the season in seventh place and were managed by Bill Merritt and Tom DeNoville. A Lowell native, Bill Merritt had purchased the New England League Salem Witches franchise and moved the team to Lowell to begin the 1929 season. After beginning the season in Lowell, poor attendance and financial issues forced Merritt to sell the team to Nashua owners. The Manchester Blue Sox won the New England League championship and finished 31.5 games ahead of the seventh place Millers/Millionaires. Nashua finished ahead of only the eighth place Gloucester Hillies in the final standigs.

The 1930 New England League continued play as a six-team League, with Nashua as a member to begin the season. On June 16, 1930, both the Lewiston Twins and Nashua Millionaires disbanded. After briefly continuing play as a four-team league, the New England League disbanded on June 22, 1930. Shano Collins managed the Millionaires, who had a record of 5–13 when they folded. The New England League did not return to play in the 1931 or 1932 seasons.

After the New England League folded during the season in 1930, Nashua manager Shano Collins immediately became the manager of Des Moines Demons. After Collins took over the team, the Demons improved last place to third place by the end of the Western League season.

After a two-season hiatus from minor league play, the 1933 Nashua Millionaires returned to the reformed six-team Class B level New England League. The Lawrence Weavers, Lowell Lauriers, New Bedford Whalers, Quincy Shipbuilders, Taunton Blues and Worcester Chiefs teams began league play on May 17, 1933 without a Nashua franchise in the league.

In 1933, as the New England League reformed as a six-team Class B level league, the Nashua Millionaires returned to New England League play for a partial season in 1933, joining the league during the season. It would be the last season of play for the Millionaires in the New England League. The team played in three cities during the season. On June 6, 1933, the Quincy Shipbuilders had compiled a 12–6 record when the franchise relocated from Quincy, Massachusetts to Nashua, playing as a Detroit Tigers minor league affiliate. The team became the "Nashua Millionaires" and Nashua continued play until the franchise relocated for a second time before completing the season. On August 8, 1933, the Nashua Millionaires moved to Brockton, Massachusetts where the team completed New England League season playing as the Brockton Shoemakers. The Quincy/Nashua/Brockton team ended the season with an overall record of 28–47, placing fifth in the six-team New England League. Hal Weafer and Paul Wolff served as managers in the three cities and the team did not qualify for the four-team leageue playoffs. The three city team placed finished 22.0 games behind the first place New Bedford Whalers in the final regular season standings. The New England League changed names after the 1933 season, before reforming in 1946.

After the 1933 season, Nashua player/manager Hal Weafer retired as a player and became a minor league umpire. Weafer worked as an umpire in the Bi-State League in 1935, the International League from 1936 to 1937, and the American Association from 1938 to 1942. After the president of the American Association suggested that Weafer lose 15–20 pounds for a promotion to MLB umpiring, Weafer began dieting and chopping down Christmas trees, as his weight went from 220 pounds to 170 pounds. He then advanced and began major league umpiring in September 1942. Weafer remained an American League umpire until 1947, when he began serving as an umpire supervisor in the minor leagues. Weafer also approved and worked with graduates of the Al Somers Umpire School.

Nashua next hosted minor league baseball in 1946. Nashua resumed play when the New England League reformed in 1946. The Nashua Dodgers were formed as a minor league affiliate of the Los Angeles Dodgers and began a noteworthy three season tenure as members of the reformed league with Baseball Hall of Fame member Walter Alston as manager. Nasuha native and former Nashua Millionaires player Ray Dobens served as the general manager of the Nashua Dodgers, with his brother Fred Dobens serving as president of the team.

== The ballparks ==
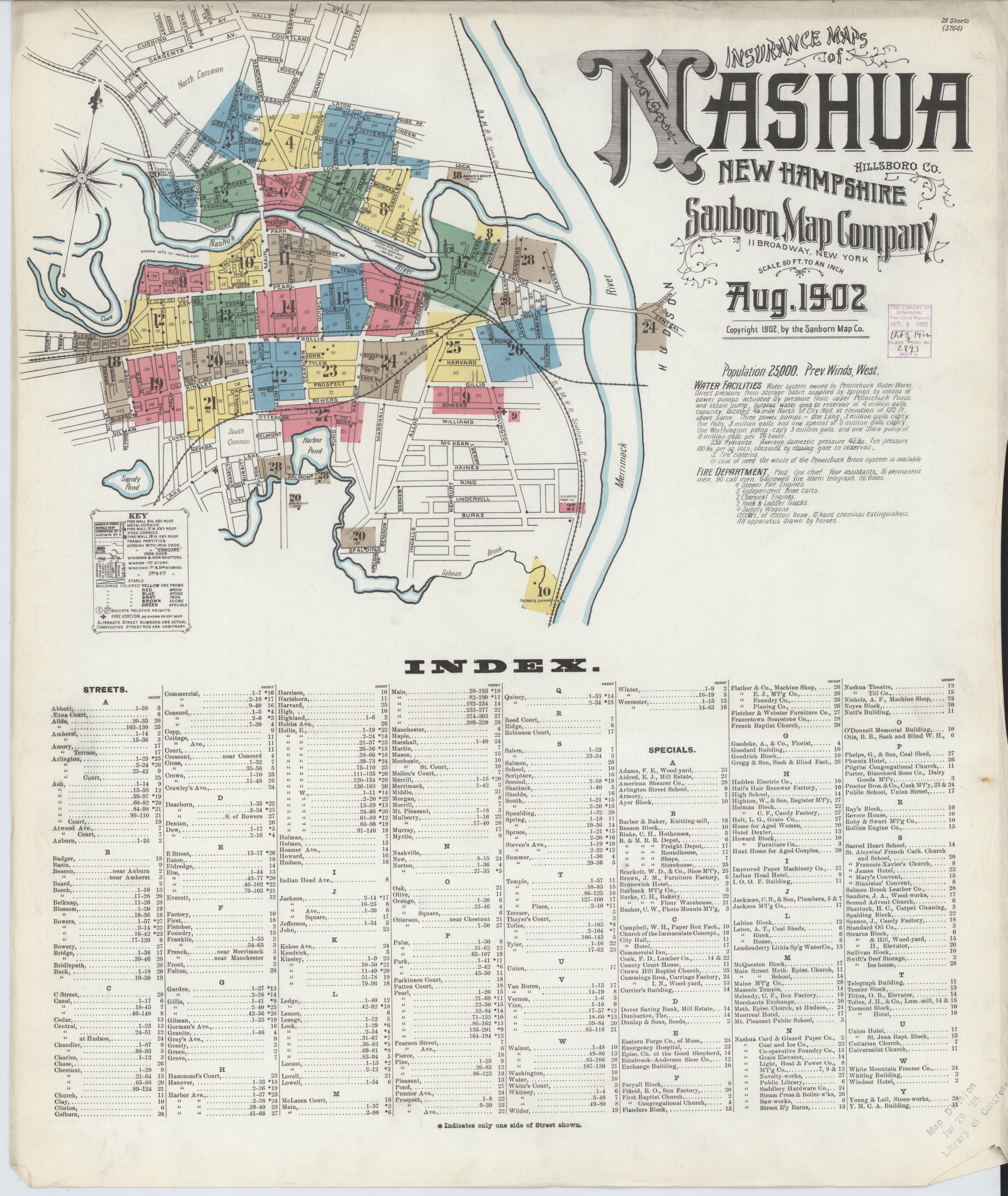
(1902) Sanborn Fire Insurance Map. Nashua, New Hampshire. The ballpark location corresponds to the south end of the map under the#20.

The Nashua teams played home minor league games at the Lawndale Park. The ballpark site was also referred to as the "North Common." In the era, the Lawndale Park ballpark site was on Lawndale Avenue, located near today's Fields Grove Park and Salmon Brook In use today as a public park with numerous amenities, Fields Grove is located on Field Street in Nashua, New Hampshire.

== Timeline ==
Year(s)	# Yrs.	Team	Level	League	Affiliate	Ballpark
1901	1	Nashua	Independent	New England League	None	Lawndale Park
1902–1905	4	Nashua	Class B	New England League	None	Lawndale Park
1926–1927	2	Nashua Millionaires	Class B	New England League	None	Lawndale Park
1929–1930	2	Nashua Millionaires	Class B	New England League	None	Lawndale Park
1933	1	Nashua Millionaires	Class B	New England League	Detroit Tigers	Lawndale Park

== Year–by–year records ==
Year	Record	Place	Manager	Playoffs/notes
1901	39–49	6th	Henry Burns	No playoffs held
1902	46–66	7th	Henry Burns	No playoffs held
1903	66–46	2nd	Ed Ashenbach / Chub Collins / Tommy Dowd	No playoffs held
1904	62–62	5th (t)	Jack Carney / Sid Rollins	No playoffs held
1905	41–66	7th	Stephen Flanagan	No playoffs held
1926	37–56	8th	Chick Keating / Fred Lake; Sandy McGregor / Johnny Mitchell	No playoffs held
1927	47–43	3rd	Bill Stewart	Did not qualify
1929	41–69	7th	Bill Merritt / Tom DeNoville	Lowell (13-22) moved to Nashua June 19. Did not qualify
1930	5–13	6th	Shano Collins	Team folded June 16; League folded June 22
1933	28–47	5th	Hal Weafer / Paul Wolff	Quincy (12–6) moved to Nashua June 6 Nashua moved to Brockton August 8 Did not qualify

== Notable alumni ==
- Charlie Butler (1929)
- John Callahan (1904)
- Jack Carney (1904, MGR)
- Chub Collins (1903, MGR)
- Shano Collins (1930, MGR)
- Frank Connaughton (1905)
- Jack Coveney (1901-1903)
- Ray Dobens (1925)
- Tommy Dowd (1903, MGR)
- Sam Edmonston (1905)
- Moonlight Graham (1903)
- Paddy Greene (1903)
- Ollie Hanson (1929)
- George Henry (1905)
- Charlie Jordan (1905)
- Tim Jordan (1902-1903)
- Chick Keating (1926, MGR)
- Fred Lake (1926, MGR)
- Ed Lennon (1926)
- Larry McLean (1903)
- Dewey Metivier (1927, 1929)
- Bill Merritt (1904; 1928, MGR)
- Johnny Mitchell (1926, MGR)
- Simmy Murch (1905)
- John Murphy (1905)
- Ed Pinnance (1904)
- Lou Polli (1926)
- Carl Ray (1925-1927)
- Ernie Ross (1902)
- Bill Stewart (1927, MGR)
- Andy Sullivan (1901)
- Clyde Sukeforth (1926)
- Tom Tuckey (1902)
- Bob Vail (1903-1904)
- Dike Varney (1905)
- Ike Van Zandt (1902-1904)
- Cy Vorhees (1903)
- Hal Weafer (1933, MGR)
- Tom Whelan (1925, MGR)
- Garry Wilson (1902, 1904)
- Henry Wilson (1904)
- Rusty Yarnall (1929)

== See also ==
- Nashua Millionaires players
- Nashua (minor league baseball) players
