= Lawrence, Massachusetts minor league baseball history =

Lawrence, Massachusetts minor league baseball teams
- 1877–1947; (1877, 1884,–1887, 1892, 1895, 1899, 1902–1917, 1919, 1926–1927, 1933, 1946–1947); Lawrence, Massachusetts

Minor league affiliations
- Class: Independent (1884–1887, 1895, 1899); Class B (1892, 1902–1917, 1919, 1926–1927, 1946–1947)
- League: New England Association (1877); Massachusetts State Association (1884); Eastern New England League (1885); New England League (1886–1887, 1892); New England Association (1895); New England League (1899, 1902–1915); Eastern League (1916–1917); New England League (1919, 1926–1927, 1933, 1946–1947)

Major league affiliations
- Team: New York Giants (1933)

Minor league titles
- League titles (4): 1885; 1895; 1912; 1914

Team data
- Name: Lawrence (1877, 1884, 1886–1887, 1892, 1899); Lawrence Indians (1895); Lawrence Colts (1902–1910); Lawrence Barristers (1911–1917, 1919); Lawrence Merry Macks (1926–1927); Lawrence Weavers, (1933); Lawrence Millionaires (1946–1947)
- Ballpark: Association Grounds (1877–1892); Glen Forest Park (1895–1910); O'Sullivan Park (1911–1917, 1919, 1926–1927, 1933, 1946–1947)

Minor league baseball teams were based in Lawrence, Massachusetts between 1877 and 1946. Lawrence minor league baseball teams played as members of the 1877 New England Association, 1884 Massachusetts State Association, 1885 Eastern New England League, New England League (1886–1887, 1892, 1899), 1895 New England Association, New England League (1899, 1902–1915), Eastern League (1916–1917) and New England League (1919, 1926–1927, 1933, 1946–1947).

Lawrence played as a minor league affiliate of the New York Giants in 1933.

Baseball Hall of Fame member Jesse Burkett served as manager of the 1916 Lawrence Barristers.

== History ==
=== Beginnings: 1877 to 1895 ===
In 1877, minor league baseball began in Lawrence, when the "Lawrence" team became founding members of the eight–team New England Association. The Lawrence team's 1877 record is unknown, as the team folded during the season.

The Massachusetts State Association played in 1884, with Lawrence as a member of the eight–team league. Lawrence finished in 4th place playing under five managers: Harry Clarke, L.S. Dow, Charles Freleigh, Matthew Barry and Frank Selee. Lawrence finished 7.0 games behind first place Springfield team in the final standings with a 7–15 record. The Massachusetts State Association folded and played only the 1884 season, with four teams folding on July 21, 1884.

The Lawrence team won a championship in 1885. Lawrence played as members of the Eastern New England League and ended the 1885 season with a record of 48–31, placing first in the Eastern New England League standings. Walter Burnham served as manager in leading Lawrence to the championship of the five–team league. The Eastern New England League played in only the 1885 season.

In 1886, Lawrence began a long association with the New England League. The team finished with a record of 42–55 and placed fifth in their first season of New England League play under manager Frank Cox. Lawrence finished 21.5 games behind first place Portland team in the six–team league.

The Lawrence team moved to Salem during the 1887 New England League season. Lawrence, with a 29–34 record, moved to Salem, Massachusetts on July 26, 1887, and became the Salem Witches. The team ended the season with a 45–50 overall record, placing fifth in the New England League, finishing 21.5 games behind the champion Lowell Browns in the eight–team league. The Lawrence/Salem team was managed by Pat Pettee and Harry Putnam. Salem continued play in the 1888 New England League.

Lawrence was without a team until rejoining the 1892 New England League in mid-season. On July 2, 1892, the Manchester Gazettes of the New England League moved to Lawrence. The team then disbanded before the conclusion of the regular season. The Manchester/Lawrence team had a 26–45 record when the team folded in Lawrence. The 1892 managers were Jim Cudworth and W.J. Freeman.

The Lawrence Indians became members of the reformed Independent New England Association in 1895. Lawrence was in first place with a 31–19 record under manager John Irwin when the league permanently folded on July 8, 1895. Lawrence was 3.0 games ahead of second place Nashua when the six–team league stopped play.

=== New England League 1899, 1902–1915 ===
Fitchburg of the New England League, with a 3–7 record, moved the franchise to Lawrence on May 24, 1899. The franchise then disbanded on June 1, 1899. The Fitchburg/Lawrence team ended the 1899 season with a record of 3–14. Ed Norton served as manager.

In 1902, Lawrence adopted the Lawrence Colts moniker and began play as members of the Class B level New England League. Playing home games at Glen Forest Park, the Lawrence Colts finished in third place in the 1902 New England League standings. The Colts finished with a record of 60–51, as William Parsons served as manager. The Colts finished 14.5 games behind first place Manchester.

Lawrence placed sixth in the 1903 New England League standings. With a 48–62 record, the Colts finished 22.5 games behind the Lowell Tigers in the final standings. William Parsons and Steve Flanagan were the managers as Lawrence continued play in the eight–team Class B league.

The Lawrence Colts finished eighth and last in the 1904 New England League. Under manager Steve Flanagan, Lawrence ended the season with a 36–86 record in the eight–team league, 45.5 games behind the first place Haverhill Hustlers and 23.5 games behind the seventh place Lowell Tigers. The Lawrence Colts folded after the 1904 season.

The 1905 New England League began play without Lawrence as a member. On July 20, 1905, the Manchester team relocated to Lawrence. The Manchester/Lawrence Colts team finished in sixth place with a record of 52–54, 16.0 games behind the first place Concord Marines, who had a 69–39 record. Win Clark managed the team in both locations.

Continuing play in the New England League, the 1906 Lawrence Colts finished third in the eight–team league. Phenomenal Smith, Al Weddige and James Rolley managed the Lawrence Colts. Ending the season with a record of 65–52, Lawrence finished 9.5 games behind the champion Worcester Busters in the final standings.

The 1907 Lawrence Colts finished eighth and last in the Class B level New England League. The Colts ended the 1907 season with a record of 40–74, finishing 37.0 games behind the first place Worcester Busters playing under manager James Rolley.

As the Worcester Busters again won the league championship, the Lawrence Colts finished second in the 1908 New England League final standings. Lawrence had a final record of 75–49 under the direction of manager Mal Eason. The Colts finished 5.0 games behind the first place Worcester Busters in the eight–team league.

The 1909 Lawrence Colts were last in the New England League standings. With a 41–82 record, Lawrence finished in eighth place, 35.5 games behind first place Worcester in the eight–team league as Mal Easton again managed the Colts.

The Lawrence Colts of the New England League ended the 1910 season with a record of 53–70. Lawrence was sixth in the standings under manager Jimmy Bannon. The Colts finished 24.0 games behind the champion New Bedford Whalers. On September 5, 1910, the Colts and Lowell Tigers played three games in one day. In the first game at Lawrence in the A.M., Lowell defeated Lawrence 3–1. The teams then traveled to Lowell for two more games. Lowell beat Lawrence 4–1 in the second game and the teams tied 4–4 in 7–innings in the final game.

The Lawrence franchise changed monikers and became the Lawrence Barristers for the 1911 New England League season. The Lawrence Barristers ended the 1911 season with a 65–55 season record, as Louis Pieper served as manager. The Barristers were third in the standings, 10.5 games behind the first place Lowell Tigers. On August 28, 1911, Harry Wormwood of Falls River threw a no-hitter against Lawrence, pitching a 13-inning no-hitter in a game that ended in a 0–0 tie.

The Lawrence Barristers won the 1912 New England League championship. With Louis Pieper continuing his tenure as manager, Lawrence finished with 76–47 record and were 2.0 games ahead of the second place Lowell Grays in the league standings. The Class B level league had no playoff structure.

The Lawrence Barristers continued play in the 1913 New England League and were unable to defend their championship. Ending the season in fourth place, Lawrence finished the season with a 67–53 record playing again under manager Louis Pieper. The Barristers finished 11.0 games behind the champion Lowell Grays.

Lawrence won the 1914 New England League Championship. The Barristers had an 84–39 record in their final season under manager Louis Pieper to finish first in the Class B league's final standings. Lawrence was 8.0 games ahead of the second place Worcester Busters in the eight–team league to win their second title in three seasons.

In 1915, Alex Pearson served as manager the Lawrence Barristers after a tenure as a player for Lawrence. The Barristers finished second in the New England League season standings. The Barristers had a record of 62–54, finishing 13.5 games behind the first place Portland Duffs. After the 1915 season, the Class D New England League folded.

=== Eastern League 1916–1917 ===
After the New England folded, the Lawrence Barristers immediately became members of the Class B level Eastern League in 1916. However, Lawrence folded on September 4, 1916. The Lawrence Barristers had a record of 51–57 under managers Jesse Burkett, Ned O'Donnell, Larry Mahoney and Jack O'Hara at the time the franchise folded.

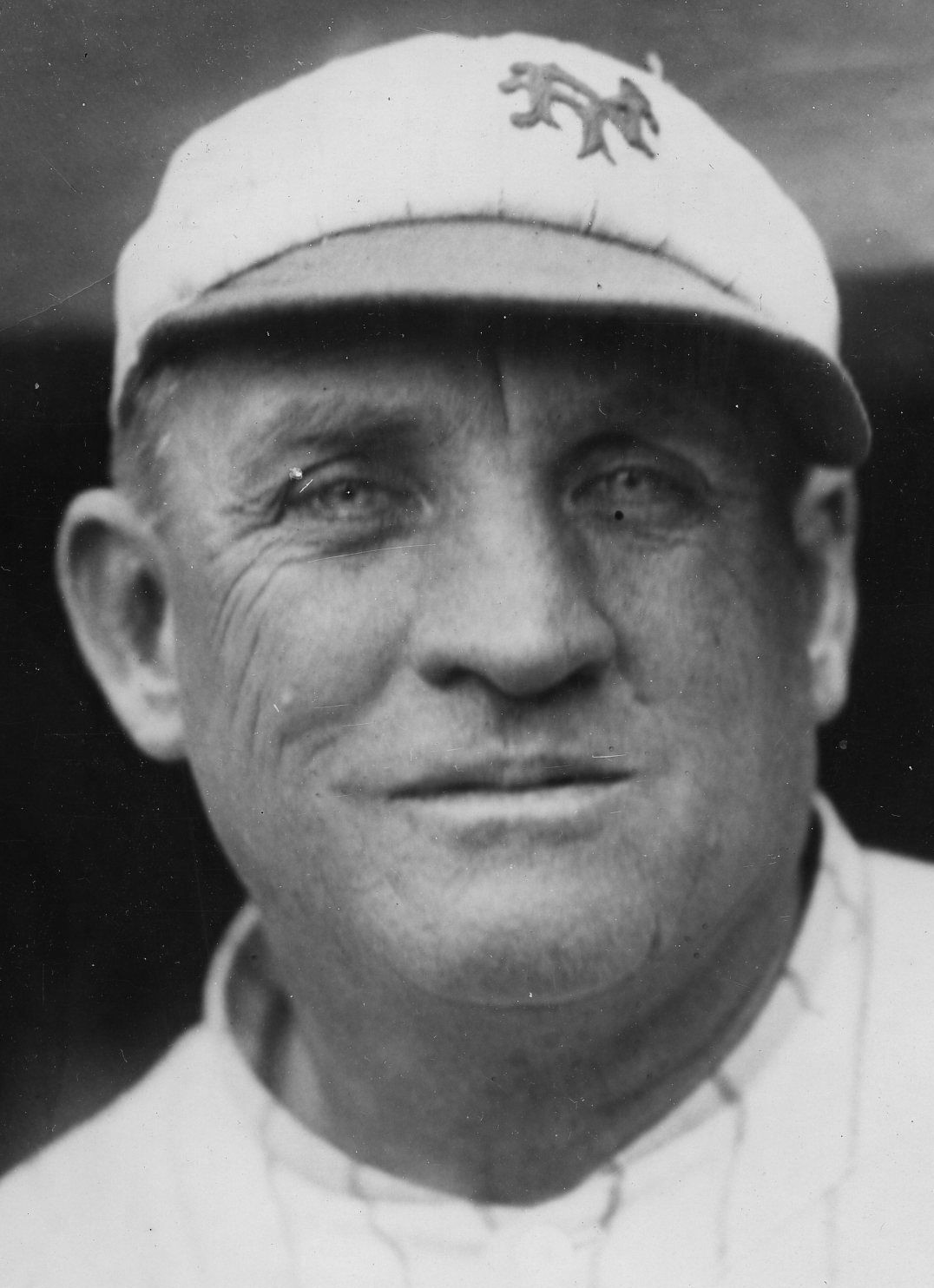
(1920) Baseball Hall of Fame member Jesse Burkett. Burkett was manager of the 1916 Lawrence Barristers.

Baseball Hall of Fame member Jesse Burkett managed the 1916 Barristers.

In 1917, the Lawrence Barristers returned to play and finished second in Eastern League standings. Lawrence ended the 1917 season with a record of 64–45 in the eight–team league, playing under manager John Flynn and finishing behind the first place New Haven Murlins. Lawrence folded from the league after the 1917 season.

=== New England League 1919, 1926–1927, 1933 ===
Lawrence fielded a team in rejoining the reformed Class B level New England League in 1919. After resuming play, the Lawrence Barristers folded on July 20, 1919. Lawrence had a record of 20-24 under manager William Page when the team folded. The New England League itself folded on August 2, 1919.

Lawrence resumed play in 1926 when the New England League reformed as a Class B level league. The Lawrence Merry Macks finished with a 46–49 record, with Lefty Tyler managing the team. The Merry Macks placed fifth in the final standings, finishing 12.5 games behind the first place Manchester Blue Sox.

In 1927, the Lawrence Merry Macks ended the regular season with a record of 36–53, placing sixth in the New England League. William McDonough and Freddy Parent served as managers as the Merry Macs finished 23.0 games behind the first place Lynn Papooses. The Lawrence Merry Macks folded after the 1927 season.

Lawrence briefly returned to the Class B level New England League as the Lawrence Weavers in 1933. On May 26, 1933, Attleboro, with a 2–6, record moved to Lawrence. After playing in Lawrence, the team relocated for a third time as the franchise was moved to Woonsocket, Rhode Island on July 18, 1933. Overall, the team finished with a 27–58 record and were sixth in the standings. The team was last in the six–team league and were an affiliate of the New York Giants.

=== New England League 1946–1947 ===
In 1946, Lawrence again returned to play as members the Class B level New England League. The New England League reformed for the 1946 season with eight teams. The Lawrence Millionaires had played in the semi–pro New England League in 1945, as the New England League kept baseball during World War II on a less formal level. The 1946 Millionaires finished 5th in the 1946 New England League regular season standings and did not qualify for the playoffs, finishing 15.0 games behind the 1st place Lynn Red Sox. With a record of 65–53, Lawrence finished in fifth place in the standings, playing under Manager George Kissell. Crash Davis, the namesake for the character in the movie Field of Dreams, played for Lawrence in 1946, hitting .298. while playing with his brother Hudson Davis.

In a June 1946 game against the Nashua Dodgers, Dodger player Roy Campanella became the first African American manager of a major league affiliated game. Campanella managed Nashua against the Millionaires after the Nashua manager, Walter Alston was ejected during a game. Nashua won the game over the Lawrence Millionaires 7–5 on a home run by Don Newcombe. Alston had previously told Campanella that he would replace him as manager if he were to be ejected from a game.

The Lawrence franchise played their final minor league season in 1947, relocating during the season. The Lawrence Millionaires relocated to become the Lowell Orphans on July 15, 1947, with a 29–38 record. The team finished had an 11–46 record after the franchise relocated to Lowell. Playing under manager George Kissell, the team finished the 1947 season with an overall record of 40–84, placing eighth and last in the New England League regular season standings, 46.0 games behind the first place Lynn Red Sox. Lawrence has not hosted another minor league team.

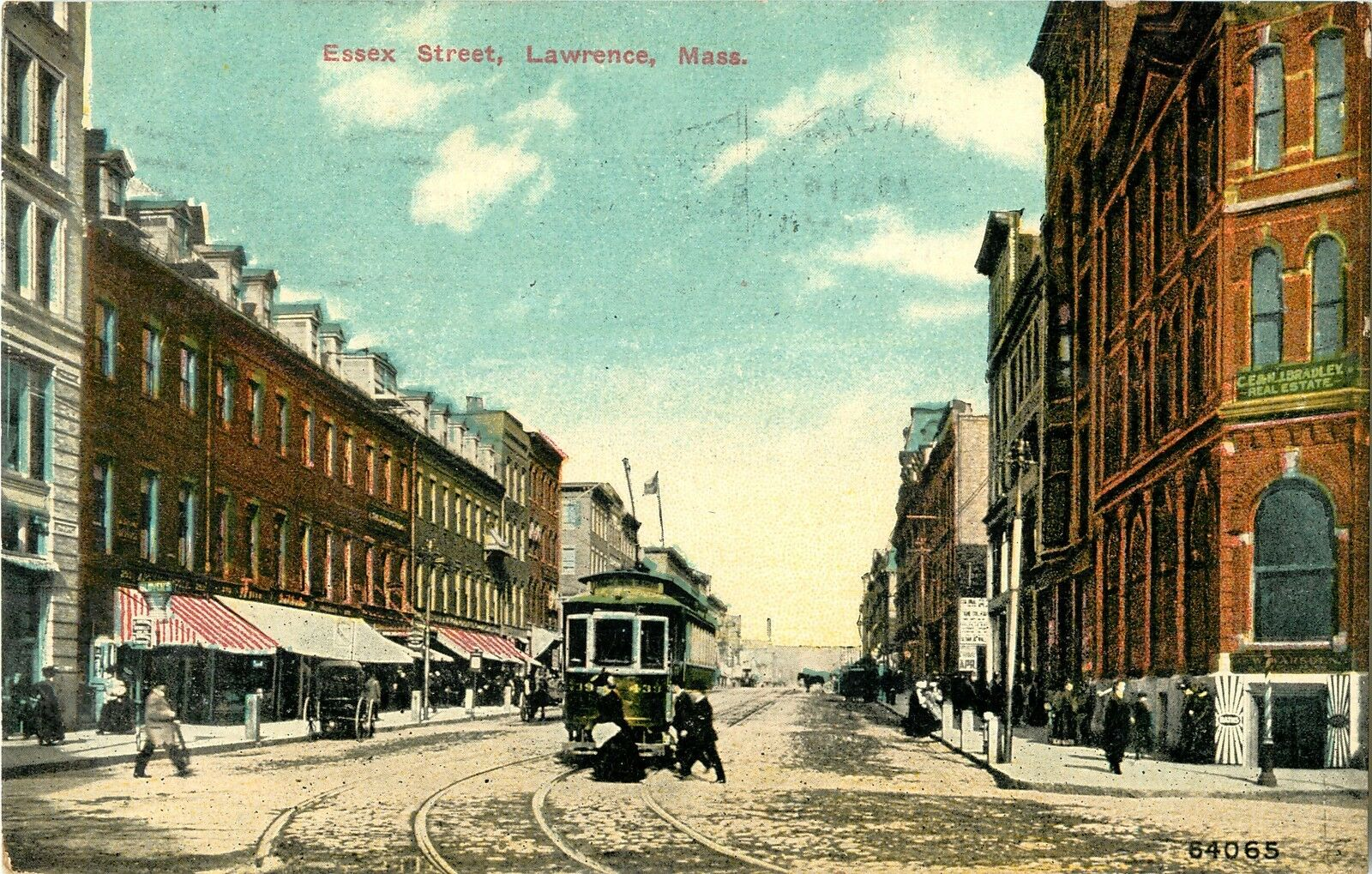
(1911) Poatcard, Streetcar line on Essex Street. Lawrence, Massachusetts

== The ballparks ==
The Lawrence teams reportedly first played home games at Association Grounds. Lawrence played at the ballpark in the seasons between 1884 and 1892. The Association Grounds were located on City Island on the Merrimack River. The Union Street Bridge leading to and from City Island burned in 1887, isolating the park from the mainland. The Lawrence team was forced to play games in Nashua until the bridge was rebuilt.

From 1895 to 1910 Lawrence teams were noted to have played minor league home games at Glen Forest Park. The ballpark was located at the end of the Electric Car line, with the site location in the Methuen area of Lawrence. The Glen Forest Park land was sold in 1922 and re–purposed.

In the minor league seasons between 1911 and 1947, Lawrence teams were noted to have played home games at O'Sullivan Park. From 1911 to 1915, the ballpark was known as Riverside Park. O'Sullivan Park was in use until the 1960s and was located on Water Street in Lawrence, Massachusetts. The Lawrence Boys and Girls Club now occupies the site. located at 136 Water Street in Lawrence, Massachusetts.

== Timeline ==
Year(s)	# Yrs.	Team	Level	League	Affiliate	Ballpark
1877	1	Lawrence	Independent	New England Association	None	Association Grounds
1884	1	Lawrence	Independent	Massachusetts State Association	None	Association Grounds
1885	1	Lawrence	Independent	Eastern New England League	None	Association Grounds
1886–1887	2	Lawrence	Independent	New England League	None	Association Grounds
1892	1	Lawrence	Class B	New England League	None	Association Grounds
1895	1	Lawrence Indians	Independent	New England Association	None	Glen Forest Park
1899	1	Lawrence	Independent	New England League	None	Glen Forest Park
1902–1910	9	Lawrence Colts	Class B	New England League	None	Glen Forest Park
1911–1915	5	Lawrence Barristers	Class B	New England League	None	O'Sullivan Park (Riverside Park)
1916–1917	2	Lawrence Barristers	Class B	Eastern League	None	O'Sullivan Park (Riverside Park)
1919	1	Lawrence Barristers	Class B	New England League	None	O'Sullivan Park (Riverside Park)
1926–1927	2	Lawrence Merry Macks	Class B	New England League	None	O'Sullivan Park (Riverside Park)
1933	1	Lawrence Weavers	Class B	New England League	New York Giants	O'Sullivan Park (Riverside Park)
1946–1947	2	Lawrence Millionaires	Class B	New England League	None	O'Sullivan Park (Riverside Park)

== Notable alumni ==
- Jesse Burkett (1916. MGR) Inducted Baseball Hall of Fame, 1946
- Jim Adams (1899)
- Eddie Ainsmith (1908–1910)
- Harry Armbruster (1905)
- Chub Aubrey (1914)
- Jimmy Bannon (1907, MGR)
- Tom Bannon (1910)
- Frank Barberich (1906–1907)
- Joe Bean (1909)
- Ned Bligh (1886)
- George Brickley (1915)
- Frank Bruggy (1913–1914)
- Jack Bushelman (1910)
- Jack Cameron (1908)
- Swede Carlstrom (1910–1913)
- Hugh Canavan (1917)
- Doc Casey (1892)
- Tom Catterson (1909, 1911)
- Win Clark (1905, MGR)
- Frank Connaughton (1906)
- Bill Conway (1885–1887)
- Dick Conway (1885–1886)
- Henry Cote (1905–1906)
- Jack Coveney (1903–1904, 1907)
- Frank Cox (1884, MGR)
- Pat Crisham (1910–1911)
- Lem Cross (1905)
- John Crowley (1886)
- Tony Cuccinello (1926–1927) 3x MLB All-Star
- Jud Daley (1917)
- Charlie Daniels (1884)
- Crash Davis (1946)
- Lee DeMontreville (1902)
- Patsy Donovan (1886–1887)
- Frank Dupee (1902)
- Howard Earl (1887)
- Mal Eason (1908–1909, MGR)
- Jack Fanning (1886)
- Duke Farrell (1887)
- Pembroke Finlayson (1910)
- Dennis Fitzgerald (1886–1887)
- Jocko Flynn (1884–1885)
- John Flynn (1917, MGR)
- Lou Galvin (1895)
- Jim Garry (1892)
- Alex Gaston (1917)
- Jack Gorman (1886)
- Lew Groh (1910)
- Jack Hammond (1909)
- Joe Harris (1903)
- Tom Hart (1895)
- George Henry (1887)
- Harry Hinchman (1917)
- Red Hoff (1912)
- Will Holland (1886)
- Dave Howard (1914)
- Del Howard (1916)
- Jerry Hurley (1884, 1886)
- Roy Hutson (1926–1927)
- John Irwin (1895, MGR)
- Charlie Jordan (1910–1912)
- Mike Jordan (1884–1885)
- Doggie Julian (1926) Naismith Basketball Hall of Fame Inducted 1967
- Ray Keating (1912)
- Jim Kelly (1926)
- John Kiley (1884, 1886–1887)
- George Kissell (1946–1947, MGR)
- Fred Klobedanz (1902–1904)
- Elmer Knetzer (1909)
- George Knothe (1926–1927)
- Karl Kolseth (1911)
- Charlie Krause (1892, 1902)
- Andy Kyle (1910)
- Otto Krueger (1910)
- Fred Lake (1906)
- Henry Lampe (1895)
- Frank Lausche (1917)
- Art LaVigne (1916)
- Bill Leith (1905–1907)
- Red Long (1902)
- Pat Martin (1913)
- Bill Massey (1909)
- Harry McCaffery (1886)
- Pat McCauley (1892)
- Michael McDermott (1892)
- Art McGovern (1914)
- Ed McLane (1908)
- Bill Merritt (1905)
- Jim Miller (1910)
- George Moolic (1884–1885)
- Hank Morrison (1886)
- Frank Morrissey (1903)
- Jack Morrissey (1905)
- Jim Moroney (1907)
- Simmy Murch (1903–1904, 1908)
- Connie Murphy (1902)
- Dave Murphy (1903, 1906)
- John Murphy (1903)
- Willie Murphy (1885, 1887)
- John O'Brien (1904)
- Pat O'Connell (1885–1886, 1895)
- Kid O'Hara (1903–1904)
- Frederick V. Ostergren (1915–1916)
- Alex Pearson (1910–1914, 1916), (1915, MGR)
- Kewpie Pennington (1914–1916)
- Pepper Peploski (1914)
- Pat Pettee (1886–1887, MGR)
- Lerton Pinto (1927)
- John Pomorski (1926–1927)
- Irv Porter (1917)
- Augie Prudhomme (1926)
- Irv Ray (1887)
- Bill Rollinson (1885)
- Ernie Ross (1902–1903)
- Bobby Rothermel (1906)
- Hank Schreiber (1917)
- George Shears (1915)
- Jack Slattery (1909)
- Phenomenal Smith (1905, MGR)
- Mike Sullivan (1884)
- John K. Tener (1885)
- Walt Thomas (1909)
- Harry Thompson (1914–1915)
- Lefty Tyler (1926, MGR)
- Gene Vadeboncoeur (1885)
- Rube Vinson (1908–1909)
- Jake Volz (1905)
- Jesse Whiting (190–1906, 1908)
- George Wheeler (1892)
- Gary Wilson (1905–1908)

== See also ==
- Lawrence Barristers players,
- Lawrence Players
- Lawrence Colts players
