= Purinton =

Purinton is a surname. Notable people with the surname include:

- Adam Purinton, murderer in the 2017 Olathe shooting
- Dale Purinton (born 1976), American hockey coach
- Edward Earle Purinton (1878–1943), American businessman, naturopath, philosopher, and self-help writer
- Richmond Purinton, partner of diarist Donald Vining
- Royce Purinton (1877–1919), American football player
