= Louis Pieper =

American college baseball coach

Louis Peiper
Biographical details
- Born: December 14, 1880; Boston, Massachusetts, U.S.
- Died: April 23, 1932 (aged 51); Newton, Massachusetts, U.S.
- Education: Harvard College; Harvard Law School

Playing career
- 1904–1905: Rockville
- 1906: Fitchburg
- Position: First baseman

Coaching career (HC unless noted)
- 1904–1906: Harvard (freshman)
- 1904–1905: Rockville
- 1906: Fitchburg
- 1907–1910: Harvard
- 1911–1914: Lawrence Barristers
- 1915–1916: Lynn Shoemakers
- 1917: Hartford Senators

Head coaching record
- Overall: 47–36–2 (Harvard)

Accomplishments and honors

Championships
- 2x New England League champion (1912, 1914)

Louis Peter Pieper (December 14, 1880 – April 23, 1932) was an American baseball coach who was the head coach of the Harvard Crimson baseball team from 1907 to 1910 and managed the Lawrence Barristers, Lynn Shoemakers, and Hartford Senators minor league baseball clubs.

== Early life ==
Pieper was born in Boston on December 14, 1880, to Joseph Manley and Catherine (Finigan) Pieper. His father was a hardware merchant. Pieper played baseball at Boston Latin School and played for the Harvard freshman and junior varsity teams, but did not make varsity due to injury. He graduated from Harvard College in 1903.

== Coaching ==
From 1904 to 1906, Pieper coached the Harvard freshman baseball team while attending Harvard Law School. He was admitted to the bar in September 1906. In 1904 and 1905, he was the player-manager of a team in Rockville, Connecticut. The following year, he was named to the same position with a club in Fitchburg, Massachusetts after the team was unable to secure the services of Nate Pulsifer. He was Fitchburg's starting first baseman and one of the best hitters on the team.

In 1907, Pieper was named head coach of the Harvard varsity baseball team. That season, Harvard went 15–7. They won their annual series against Yale at the Polo Grounds for the first time since 1904 and defeated Holy Cross for the first time in many years. After beating Yale, Pieper was presented with a silver cigarette case by his team. The Crimson went 11–12–1 the following year and during the offseason, he married Elizabeth M. Ring. Harvard's 1909 record was 13–6, but there was serious consideration to replace him for the 1910 season. He was supported for reappointment by team captain Charles Lanigan, but some member of the athletic committee and alumni wanted to see him replaced. According to the New York Times, Pieper "overloaded his men with the so-called inside baseball, neglecting the fact that the bat plays an important part in baseball. His teams have woefully poor batters". On January 5, 1910, the athletic committee voted to reappoint Pieper. The Crimson finished that season with an 8–11–1 record.

On September 22, 1910, Pieper purchased the financially struggling Lawrence franchise in the New England League for $6,500. He served as club president and manager, while Daniel A. Noonan, a New Yorker who left the garment business for baseball, was the club's controlling owner, business manager, and secretary-treasurer. In their first season under Pieper, Lawrence went 65-55 and finished in third place. Lawrence's 1912 team, led by pitchers Ray Keating and Red Hoff, was much stronger. That August, Pieper sold Keating's contract to the New York Highlanders for $5,000. The sale was contested by shareholder Joseph Sullivan, who believed that the team could have received more money. On August 9, a judge refused to issue an injunction to stop the sale. On September 6, 1912, Lawrence won its first New England League title under Pieper by defeating Fall River in both games of a doubleheader. Lawrence's 1914 team included future or past major league players Frank Bruggy, Alex Pearson, Harry Thompson, and Chub Aubrey. During the season, Noonan purchased the Haverhill Hustlers. After the acquisition, Haverhill traded pitcher Jack Barron, who was performing well for the club, to Lawrence for William Fullerton, who was struggling. This led the Lawrence to receive the nickname "Pieper's Pirates". Lawrence finished the year with a 84–39 record and won the League pennant. They defeated the New London Planters, champions of the Eastern Association, in a postseason series.

Noonan and Pieper ended their partnership after the 1914 season. That October, Eugene B. Frazer, president of Lynn's NEL club, announced that he and Pieper had purchased the team from the Lynn Baseball and Amusement club for an undisclosed amount of money. Noonan, meanwhile, moved his Haverhill team to Fitchburg, but died unexpectedly during the 1915 season. Lynn secured a third place finish in 1915 with a 62–57 record. Prior to the 1916 season, Lynn moved to the Eastern League, which was formed by clubs from the New England League and the defunct Eastern Association. Lynn notched a 66-57 record in the league's inaugural season, good for fourth place.

On January 30, 1907, Frazer sold the Lynn franchise to the league for $2,700. On March 28, the Lynn franchise was sold to Robert Emmons, who relocated the team to Lawrence, Massachusetts. On April 14, 1917, Pieper was named manager of the Hartford Senators. At the end of the season, he announced that he was leaving baseball to become the Kansas City, Missouri-based division superintendent of a chain of stores.

== Legal and business career ==
Pieper was admitted to the Suffolk County bar in 1906 and practiced with the firm of Pieper & Sullivan in Boston. After purchasing the Lawrence Barristers, he opened a law office in Lawrence. After leaving baseball, he worked for the Atlantic & Pacific Tea Company and Continental Chain Stores. In 1922, he became the wholesale manager of S. S. Pierce & Co. He remained in this role until his death on April 23, 1932 at Newton Hospital.
