= Nate Pulsifer =

American professional baseball player

Nate Pulsifier
Biographical details
- Born: September 11, 1876; Auburn, Maine, U.S.
- Died: August 5, 1950 (aged 73); Worcester, Massachusetts, U.S.
- Education: Bates

Playing career

Baseball
- 1897: Lewiston
- 1898: Hartford Cooperatives
- 1898: Lyons
- 1899: Portland Phenoms
- 1900–1901: Norfolk Skippers
- 1901: Tarboro Tartars
- 1902–1904: Concord Marines
- 1905: Sioux City Packers
- 1906–1907: Haverhall Hustlers
- 1908: Lynn Shoemakers
- Positions: First baseman, second baseman, shortstop

Coaching career (HC unless noted)

Football
- 1899: Hebron Academy
- 1900–1905: Dean Academy
- 1908: Tufts
- 1914–1916: Lowell HS (MA)

Basketball
- 1908–1909: Tufts

Nathan Pulsifer (September 11, 1876 – August 5, 1950) was an American physician, minor league baseball player, and collegiate football player and coach. He was the head football coach at the Dean Academy before accepting the same role at Tufts University in 1908. He was also the head men's basketball coach at Tufts during the 1908–09 season.

== Early life ==
Pulsifer was born on September 11, 1876 in Auburn, Maine. He was the youngest boy of seven children born to Augustus Moses and Harriet (Chase) Pulsifer. He prepared for college at Nichols Latin School and played for the Bates football team in 1894 while still attending Nicholls. He played baseball for Bates that following spring and entered the college in the fall of 1895. He was captain of the football team his junior and senior seasons. Bates's 1897 team, with Pulsifer at running back and Royce Purinton at quarterback, finished 4–0–1 and won the Maine championship. The following season, Bates went undefeated and was not scored on in any of its six games.

== Baseball ==
Pulsifer played twelve seasons of minor league baseball. He began his career in 1897 with Lewiston of the Maine State League. He then played for former Major League Baseball Phenomenal Smith in Hartford, Portland, and Norfolk. He was a member of the Concord Marines of the New England League from 1902 to 1904 and was player–manager during his final season there. After a one year stint with the Sioux City Packers, Pulsifer returned to the New England League as a member of the Haverhill Hustlers. He was Haverhill's manager during the 1906 season. His final season came in 1908 as a member of the Lynn Shoemakers.

== Coaching ==
After graduating, Pulsifer coached at the Hebron Academy. From 1900 to 1906, he was a mathematics and athletics instructor at the Dean Academy. His 1905 football team was not scored on. He left Dean to attend Cornell Medical College. He withdrew in 1908 and became the athletic director at Tufts. He had charge of all of the school's athletic teams, except for track. His 1908 football team amassed a 1–6–1 record and that season's basketball team went 10–5. He left Tufts after one year to return to medical school. Pulsifer was the head football coach at Lowell High School from 1914 to 1916 and later served as the team's physician.

== Medicine ==
Pulsifer graduated from Cornell in 1910. He was an intern at Lowell General Hospital from 1911 to 1912 and worked as a practicing physician in Lowell, Massachusetts thereafter. During World War I, he was the surgeon for the 340th Infantry Regiment and held the rank of Major. After the war, he returned to his practice in Lowell, where he became acquainted with Jack Kerouac. The character of Dr. Simpkins in Kerouac's Visions of Gerard was based on Pulsifer.

== Personal life ==
In 1909, Pulsifer married Edith Coggeshall, of Lowell, an art teacher at Dean. They had one daughter, also named Edith. Pulsifer retired in the 1940s due to dementia and died at the Worcester Veterans Home on August 5, 1950. He was buried at Edson Cemetery in Lowell.
