= Roscoe Coughlin =

American baseball player (1868–1951)

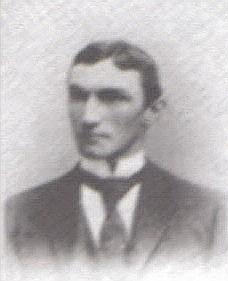
- Pitcher
- Born: February 23, 1865; Dedham, Massachusetts, U.S.
- Died: March 20, 1951 (aged 86); Chelsea, Massachusetts, U.S.
- Batted: Unknown Threw: Right

MLB debut
- April 22, 1890, for the Chicago Colts

Last MLB appearance
- October 2, 1891, for the New York Giants

MLB statistics
- Win–loss record: 7–10
- Innings pitched: 156
- Earned run average: 4.10
- Stats at Baseball Reference

Teams
- Chicago Colts (1890); New York Giants (1891)

William Edward "Roscoe" Coughlin (February 23, 1865 – March 20, 1951) was an American professional baseball player who was a pitcher for two seasons in the National League (NL). In 1890 he pitched for the Chicago Colts and in 1891 he played for the New York Giants. Prior to his Major League Baseball career, he began his minor league career in 1887, and continued afterward until 1897.

== Career ==
=== Minor leagues ===
Coughlin was born on February 23, 1865, in Dedham, Massachusetts, and at the age of 19, he began his minor league career in 1887 with the Lynn, Massachusetts based Lynn Lions of the New England League (NEL). In 1888, he played for several minor league teams, including the Chicago Maroons of the newly founded Western Association, which covered many of the same locations as the American Association. Later into the season, he moved to the West Coast and played for the Oakland Greenhood & Morans, and the San Francisco Pioneers, both members of the California League (CL). He then completed the season with the Portsmouth Lillies of the New England Interstate League (NEIL). In 1889, Coughlin returned to Oakland and the CL, with which he played the entire season with the Colonels, won 30 games.

=== Major leagues ===
Coughlin began the 1890 season in the CL; however, it was for a different team, the San Francisco Haverlys. After registering 27 wins, he made his Major League Baseball debut on April 22 for the Chicago Colts of the NL, pitching them to a 13–3 victory over the Cincinnati Reds. In his short time with the Colts, he had a 4–6 win–loss record, with his last decision occurring on June 11, in a 7–1 victory over the Cleveland Spiders in the first game of a doubleheader. He completed the season with the Sacramento Senators of the CL.

He began the 1891 season with the Syracuse Stars of the Eastern Association, playing from April 24 until August 28, until he joined the New York Giants of the NL. He pitched in eight games for the Giants, and finished the season with a 3–4 win–loss record. His final appearance was on October 2, and was the last of his major league experience. In 19 career games pitched, he had a 7–10 win–loss record, and had a 4.10 earned run average in 156 innings pitched.

=== Return to the minors ===
Coughlin played for several minor league teams, beginning the season with the Syracuse/Utica Stars, with which he played from April 25 to June 30, the Binghamton Bingos from July 20 to August 20, and the Rochester Flour Cities from August 21 to September 16, all of the Eastern League (EL) From 1893 until into the 1897 season, he continued in EL, playing for the Springfield Ponies/Maroons. Later in 1897, he switched over to the Brockton, Massachusetts based Brockton Shoemakers of the NEL, and pitched in five games and had a 1–3 win–loss record in 39 innings pitched. He completed the season with the Wilkes-Barre Coal Barons of EL. There is no record of him playing professional baseball following the 1897 season.

Coughlin was a veteran of the Spanish–American War, died at the age of 83 on March 20, 1951, while living in the Old Soldiers Home in Chelsea, Massachusetts; he is interred at St. Patrick Cemetery in Lowell, Massachusetts.
