= Ike Van Zandt =

American baseball player (1876–1908)

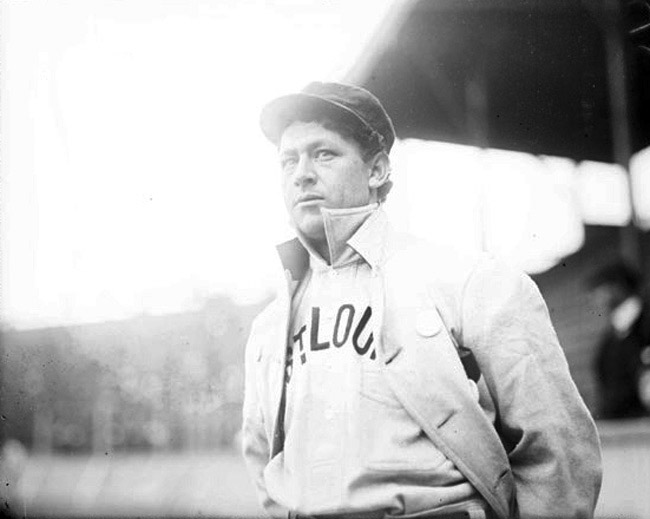
- Outfielder/Pitcher
- Born: February 1876; Brooklyn, New York, U.S.
- Died: September 14, 1908 (aged 32); Nashua, New Hampshire, U.S.
- Batted: Left Threw: Left

MLB debut
- August 5, 1901, for the New York Giants

Last MLB appearance
- October 8, 1905, for the St. Louis Browns

MLB statistics
- Batting average: .224
- Home runs: 1
- Runs batted in: 20
- Stats at Baseball Reference

Teams
- New York Giants (1901); Chicago Cubs (1904); St. Louis Browns (1905)

Charles Isaac "Ike" Van Zandt (February 1876 – September 14, 1908) was an American professional baseball player who played three seasons in Major League Baseball from 1901 to 1905. After his career in the majors, he was involved in a scandal involving possibly throwing a game for money, and committed suicide.

== Career ==
Born in Brooklyn, Van Zandt broke into the major leagues with the New York Giants of the National League in 1901. He played in three games that season, pitching in two, and playing left field in the other. He pitched a total of 12 2/3 innings and had an earned run average of 7.11. He had one hit in six at bats, and scored one run.

Van Zandt's next appearance in the majors didn't occur until 1904, when he played in three games for the Chicago Cubs. He played the three games in the outfield, and did not gather a hit in 11 at-bats. Later, during the 1904 season, he returned to the minor leagues, playing for Nashua in the New England League, from where the major-league St. Louis Browns of the American League acquired him on September 1, 1904, in the Rule 5 draft.

His one season in St. Louis was where he had most of his MLB experience, playing in 94 games, batting .233 in 322 at-bats, totaling 15 doubles, one triple, and one home run, and scoring 31 runs. This was his last season in the majors. He later played in the minors for the St. Paul Saints, Binghamton Bingoes, and Albany Senators.

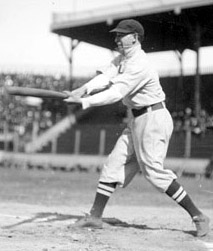
Ike Van Zandt with the St. Louis Browns in 1905

== Death ==
Van Zandt had finished the 1908 season playing for Albany, when he returned to his hometown of Nashua, New Hampshire. On September 14, he committed suicide by shooting himself through the heart with a revolver. One possible reason for his decision was a possible involvement in a game-fixing scandal that was about to be printed by a newspaper. However, according to the Society for American Baseball Research, he wrote a two-page note to his wife explaining that he had developed terrible stomach issues and that he didn't want to be a burden to her before shooting himself. He is interred at Woodlawn Cemetery in Nashua.
