= George Kissell =

American baseball player and coach

- Born: September 9, 1920; Evans Mills, New York, U.S.
- Died: October 7, 2008 (aged 88); Tampa, Florida, U.S.
- Education: Ithaca College
- Occupation: Baseball coach
- Spouse: Virginia
- Awards: St. Louis Cardinals Hall of Fame

George Marshall Kissell (September 9, 1920 – October 7, 2008) was an American professional baseball minor league player, manager, coach, scout, and instructor, as well as a Major League coach, for the St. Louis Cardinals organization, and a key in establishing "the Cardinal Way". Although his seven decade career was spent with the Cardinals, he had a much broader impact on baseball. He mentored hall of fame managers Earl Weaver, Sparky Anderson, Joe Torre, and Tony La Russa, and thousands of players over the years.

Kissel was inducted into the St. Louis Cardinals Hall of Fame in 2015.

== Early life ==
Kissell was born on September 9, 1920, in Evans Mills, New York, and grew up in the Watertown, New York area, on a dairy farm. He graduated from Evans Mills High School and attended Ithaca College (1938-42), where he earned both Bachelor's and Master's degrees in history and physical education. His senior thesis paper was on how to play and teach baseball. As a baseball player at Ithaca, he had a .323 batting average his senior year.

At Ithaca, he started on the baseball and soccer teams from 1940–42. After graduating, and playing minor league baseball in 1941-42, Kissell served in the U.S. Navy during World War II. He was inducted into the Ithaca College Athletic Hall of Fame in 1970.

== Baseball career ==
=== Minor league player ===
In 1940, while still in college, Kissell was signed as an infielder by Branch Rickey of the St. Louis Cardinals, and would go on to spend the rest of his life with the Cardinals organization. As a player, he stood 5 ft 8 in (1.73 m) tall and weighed 175 lb (79 kg). He threw and batted right-handed. In 1941, he played 63 games in the minor leagues and 111 in 1942, playing Class D and Class B baseball, before enlisting in the Navy in 1943. His batting average was over .300 both years, and he led the Southern League in stolen bases in 1942. As a minor leaguer, he was primarily a third baseman, although he also played shortstop, and never rose above the Class B level as a player.

=== Minor league manager, scout and roving instructor ===
In 1946, after three seasons in the military during World War II, the Cardinals offered the 25-year old Kissell the opportunity to serve as a player-manager, and he took that position with the Lawrence Millionaires of the Class B New England League. Rickey was particularly impressed by Kissell's work ethic, thoroughness, and sense of responsibility, as well as his managerial ability.

Kissell continue to play full time from 1946–49, and then reduced his playing time from 1950–52, before ending his playing career. He hit over .300 multiple times during that period. He served as a manager in the Cardinal farm system with numerous teams for 20 years (1946-57, 1961-68), holding a won-loss record of 1,254–1,210. The teams were typically in the lower level minor leagues, and instructional or rookie leagues.

His most successful season as a manager came in 1950 with the Class B Winston-Salem Cardinals, who won 106 of 153 regular-season games and the Carolina League playoff championship. One of his players was future Hall of Fame manager Earl Weaver. During that 1950 season, Kissell showed fierce leadership both through his hard play in the field and guidance as a manager (that often included arguing with the umpires). He turned down an opportunity to join the Cardinals in September as a backup player, to stick with his Winston-Salem team and players.

Kissell worked for the Cardinals as scout from 1958–62. In 1968, he spent his first season as a roving instructor in the Cardinal system, where his efforts led to the nickname of "the Professor", and his influence is generally regarded as being a major basis for what came to be known as the "Cardinal Way".

=== St. Louis Cardinals ===
From 1969–75, Kissell served as a major league third base coach for the Cardinals, under manager Red Schoendienst. After serving as a coach, he continued on with the Cardinals; working with players at spring training, directing the team's winter instructional camps, and, until his death, serving as a senior field coordinator for player development.

=== The Cardinal Way ===
Kissell is considered a progenitor of "the Cardinal Way". The Cardinal Way is the team's philosophy and practices (the why and how) taught to players and coaches uniformly in the Cardinal organization. Kissell began creating a notebook with his ideas and practices on how to teach and practice baseball early in his Cardinals career (though instruction was originally unwritten); which became the basis of a more formal written (and digital) manual after his death. Kissell would diagram the possible game situations and explain how the Cardinals expected players to react. Kissell described the rationale behind the Cardinal Way as: "Tell me and I'll forget. Show me and I'll remember. Involve me and I'll understand."

Other than the New York Yankees, the Cardinals have won more World Series than any other team. As of 2022, they had the fourth highest winning percentage in baseball history (behind the Yankees, Giants and Dodgers); and third highest from 2012-22, behind the Dodgers and Yankees. By one method, they have been rated as the third most successful team behind the Yankees and Dodgers.

== Impact on baseball ==
Kissell mentored a number of major league managers. In addition to Weaver, who played under Kissell for three seasons, these included Hall of Fame managers Sparky Anderson, Joe Torre, and Tony LaRussa. La Russa, Torre and Anderson have the second, fifth and sixth most managerial wins in major league history (through the 2024 season), and Weaver has the sixth highest winning percentage (.583) among managers with over 1,000 wins (through the 2024 season).

All have prominently stated that Kissell was a primary influence on them as managers. In his Baseball Hall of Fame acceptance speech, Anderson said, “A man named George Kissell, the greatest single instructor I ever seen on fundamentals in my life. Fifty-some years with the Cardinals. And Georgie . . . he was something special to me.”

He tutored virtually all players in the Cardinals minor league system who would go on to major league careers from the 1940s to the 2000s, and players who joined the team via other means. In addition to mentoring Torre the manager, he helped guide Torre the player in switching from catcher to third base. He had a central impact on Hall of Fame pitcher Steve Carlton (whose 329 wins are 11th in baseball history), and strong influence on other players like Keith Hernandez, Andy Van Slyke, and Mike Shannon.

At his Hall of Fame induction, catcher Ted Simmons said Kissell had the greatest impact on his career. Kissell guided future All-Star and World Series winning third baseman Ken Boyer in his transition from pitcher to hitter and infielder in the minor leagues. He excelled at teaching switch hitting and bunting, and worked with switch hitters like Tom Herr, Willie McGee, Vince Coleman, Terry Pendleton and Ozzie Smith.

== Legacy and honors ==
Kissell received numerous honors for his work in baseball, including induction into the Missouri Sports Hall of Fame in 2003. In recognition for his years of service to the game, Kissell received the King of Baseball award in 1993 from Minor League Baseball. In addition, the Cardinals' spring training clubhouse in Jupiter, Florida, was named after him during spring training in 2005. The Cardinals organization annually honors a minor league coach with the George Kissell Award. In 2015 Kissel was inducted into the St. Louis Cardinals Hall of Fame. La Russa has advocated for Kissell's inclusion in the National Baseball Hall of Fame.

Said former Cardinal manager Whitey Herzog in 2005, “He is one of those baseball lifers that loves to talk baseball ... George Kissell is the only man I know who can talk for 15 minutes about a ground ball.”

== Death ==
At the age of 88, Kissell died after sustaining injuries in a car accident in Pinellas Park, Florida, in 2008.

== See also ==
- List of St. Louis Cardinals coaches
