= Ray Dobens =

American baseball player (1906–1980)

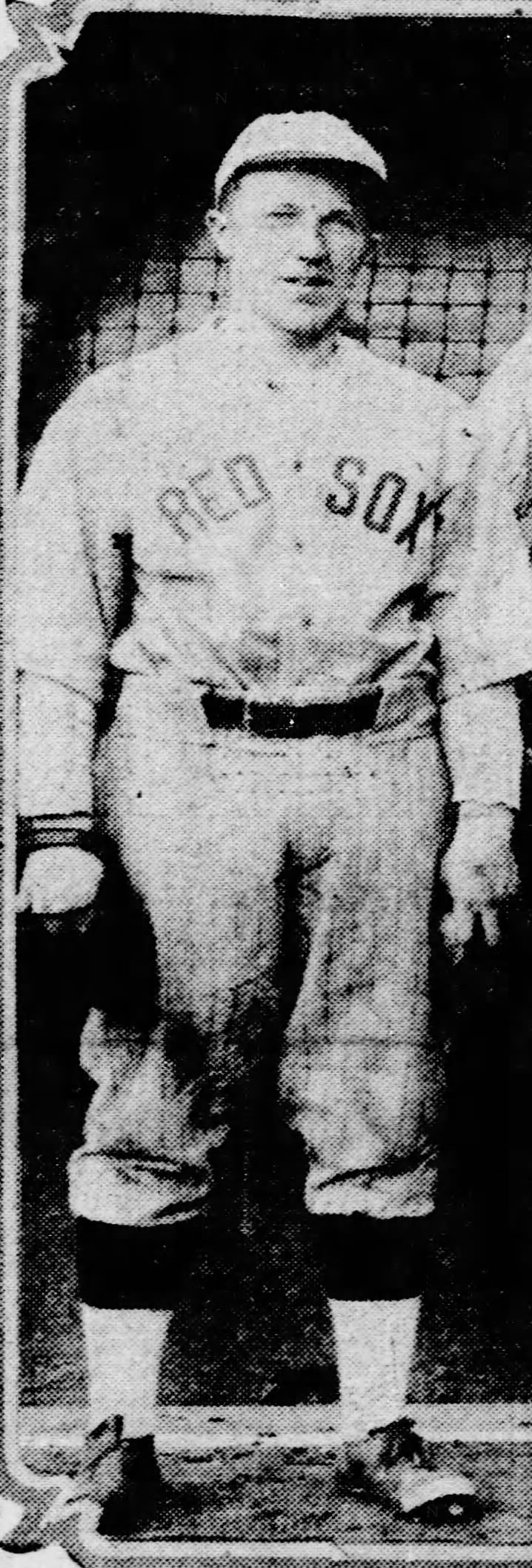
- Pitcher
- Born: July 28, 1906; Nashua, New Hampshire, U.S.
- Died: April 21, 1980 (aged 73); Stuart, Florida, U.S.
- Batted: Left Threw: Left

MLB debut
- July 7, 1929, for the Boston Red Sox

Last MLB appearance
- September 25, 1929, for the Boston Red Sox

MLB statistics
- Win–loss record: 0–0
- Earned run average: 3.81
- Strikeouts: 4
- Stats at Baseball Reference

Teams
- Boston Red Sox (1929)

Raymond Joseph Dobens (July 28, 1906 – April 21, 1980) was an American pitcher in Major League Baseball who played briefly for the Boston Red Sox during the 1929 season. He was born in Nashua, New Hampshire, and attended the College of the Holy Cross, where he played baseball. The college's Varsity Club annually presents the Ray Dobens Award to its "most improved player."

Listed at 5 feet 8 inches (1.73 m) tall and 175 pounds (79 kg), Dobens batted and threw left-handed. During his MLB trial, he recorded a 3.81 ERA with four strikeouts and 28⅓ innings of work in 11 appearances, two as a starter. He did not have a decision. The 1929 Red Sox finished eighth and last in the American League with a 58–96 record.

Dobens was general manager of the Nashua Dodgers of the old New England League. The Dodgers were the first team in the United States with Black ball players. Branch Rickey of the Brooklyn Dodgers assigned Don Newcombe and Roy Campanella to the Nashua Dodgers in 1946 when Jackie Robinson was assigned to Montreal.

Dobens' professional career lasted three seasons. He died in Stuart, Florida, at the age of 73.

== See also ==
- Boston Red Sox all-time roster
