= Ed Pinnance =

Canadian baseball player (1879–1944)

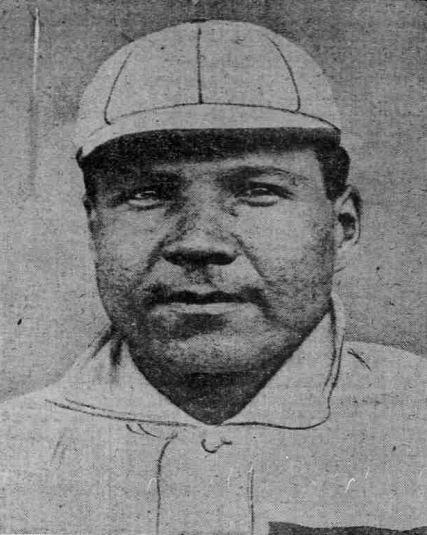
- Pitcher
- Born: September 22, 1879; Walpole Island, Ontario, Canada
- Died: December 12, 1944 (aged 65); Walpole Island, Ontario, Canada
- Batted: Left Threw: Right

MLB debut
- September 14, 1903, for the Philadelphia Athletics

Last MLB appearance
- September 29, 1903, for the Philadelphia Athletics

MLB statistics
- Win–loss record: 0–0
- Earned run average: 2.57
- Strikeouts: 2
- Stats at Baseball Reference

Teams
- Philadelphia Athletics (1903)

Elijah Edward Pinnance (September 22, 1879 – December 12, 1944), nicknamed "Peanuts", was a Canadian Major League Baseball pitcher. He played for the Philadelphia Athletics during the 1903 season.

Pinnance was the first full-blooded American Indian to play in a regular season game in the majors, which occurred on September 14, 1903. At that time, Pinnance pitched for the Philadelphia Athletics at Washington against the Senators.

He went to Michigan State University.
