= Donald Vining =

American gay diarist

Donald Vining (Benton, Pennsylvania, June 20, 1917 – January 24, 1998, New York City), was a gay diarist.

== Youth and education ==
Vining was the only child of Charles Horace Vining, Jr. and Marjorie Crossley Vining. His parents separated when he was young, and he and his mother were poor. He grew up in various towns in eastern Pennsylvania, graduating from high school in Bloomsburg, PA in 1933. He began keeping a daily diary while still a teen-ager. He attended Carnegie Tech briefly in 1934–1935 as a drama major, but could not afford to continue. He was a student at West Chester University in Pennsylvania between 1937 and 1939, where he was active in local theater groups, before to his admission to the Yale School of Drama as a playwrighting major. Before World War II, a number of his plays were produced for the stage and for the WICC Radio "Listeners' Theatre", broadcast on the Yankee Network. His plays were subsequently published in such volumes as Yale Radio Plays and Plays For Players.

== New York City ==
He moved to New York City 1942, where he had a variety of non-professional jobs, notably as a clerk at Sloane House, the YMCA on West 34th Street. In the 1950s he served as Drama Editor of What's Cookin' magazine and wrote numerous freelance articles and stories for other varied publications and periodicals. Vining's playwriting ambitions gradually petered out, and he eventually took a full-time position in the Development Office at Teacher's College, Columbia University, spending 30 years there in a job he disliked before taking early retirement, in part so he could start his own publishing company, The Pepys Press, named in honor of one of the most celebrated of all diarists, Samuel Pepys. Vining's small publishing firm, operating out of his condominium apartment at Fifth Avenue at 108th Street, produced five volumes of his acclaimed Gay Diary as well as the anthology, American Diaries of World War II, and other works.

Vining published essays on gay relationships — his own with his partner Richmond Purinton (November 9, 1905 - November 16, 1989) lasted more than 43 years — which appeared in varied American periodicals; in 1986, the Crossing Press published a volume of his collected essays, How Can You Come Out If You've Never Been In? He also wrote numerous scripts, plays, poems and stories throughout his lifetime. His first story published in book form was in Cross-Section 1945 with his Show Me The Way To Go Home. Vining's short story The Old Dog was later published in Story Magazine, soon after immortalized in the book Story: The Fiction of The Forties, and today continues to be used in schools across the United States.

== Diary ==
At best, Vining had a minor success as a playwright and short story writer. His importance rests in the five volumes of his published diary, appearing between 1979 and 1993. In his review of the first volume of the diary in Body Politic, John D'Emilio said that "A Gay Diary is, unquestionably, the richest historical document of gay male life in the United States that I have ever encountered.... It chronicles a whole life in which homosexuality is but one part and an ever-changing part at that.... It illuminates a critical period in gay male American history." D'Emilio discusses the earlier years of the diary at some length in his Sexual Politics, Sexual Communities: The Making of a Homosexual Minority.

In a 1999 review of John Donald Gustav-Wrathall's Take the Young Man by the Hand: Same-Sex Relations and the YMCA (University of Chicago Press, 1998) Jesse Monteagudo points out that Gustav-Wrathall's narrative

picks up considerably when it quotes from Donald Vining's diaries, and we can only regret that Gustav-Wrathall did not spice his tale with more of this kind of personal, and sexy, anecdotes. Doing so would have made Take the Young Stranger by the Hand much more interesting to readers who are intrigued by the topic but who might be turned off by all the dry details. This is a shame, for by doing so the reader would miss learning about an important chapter in gay and men's history.

The strength of Vining's diary lies precisely in his detailed chronicle of the daily life of non-professional gay men in Manhattan over a period of more than 40 years. Paul Robinson emphasizes the cheerful tone of the diary in his Gay Lives: "Again and again it tells a story of perseverance, of triumph over adversity, of making the most of the hand one is dealt in life" [p. 285]. Joseph Cady calls it "a goldmine of information about earlier American gay male social life, especially during World War II and the immediate post-war years."

Vining gives his ground rules for inclusion in the preface to the first published volume of the diary:

Readability and continuity were the only criteria for selection of these excerpts. There has been no attempt to touch up the self-portrait by removing warts nor to make improvements in the quality of the writing, often poor due to haste, fatigue, and, I'm afraid, blind spots in my mastery of capitalization, punctuation, and grammar.... On the one hand I should have loved to amplify, explain, retract, or rephrase a thousand passages but on the other hand I felt it unfair to cosmeticize, patronize or apologize for my younger self. The only tampering done with the original text, save for the vast amount of cutting necessary to bring so many hundreds of thousands of words down to publishable dimensions, was the use of some pseudonyms. Given the harassment suffered by some homosexuals (mercifully, not by me to date) and the fear of such harassment that haunts and restricts the lives of many others, I have altered several names. A few names of less vulnerable people have also been altered if I thought what I said about them might embarrass them. Whether homosexual or heterosexual, however, the people whose names were altered are all obscure and nothing of essential truth is lost by the changes.

In length and scope among American gay diaries of the 20th century, Vining's diary is matched perhaps only by those of Ned Rorem, though Vining's canvas is much smaller than that of Rorem. Vining's acquaintance among the rich and famous was limited; his diary is at its best in chronicling the minutiae of the daily life of intellectually curious and sexually active gay men both before and after the Stonewall riots.

He was selected for inclusion in the Who's Who in the East 25th Edition, published in 1994. He died in New York City on January 24, 1998, at the age of 80, and is buried alongside Richmond Purinton at Forest Grove Cemetery, Augusta, Kennebec County, Maine.

Many of Vining's original diaries for the 1932–1958 period are now at Yale University. There is a substantial archive of Vining's playscripts, correspondence, and related material in the Humanities and Social Sciences Library of the New York Public Library.
