= Tug Wilson (baseball) =

American baseball player (1860–1914)

- Outfielder / Catcher
- Born: 1860; Brooklyn, New York, U.S.
- Died: November 28, 1914; Brooklyn, New York, U.S.
- Batted: Unknown Threw: Unknown

MLB debut
- May 9, 1884, for the Brooklyn Atlantics

Last MLB appearance
- July 21, 1884, for the Brooklyn Atlantics

MLB statistics
- Batting average: .232
- Home runs: 0
- Runs scored: 13
- Stats at Baseball Reference

Teams
- Brooklyn Atlantics (1884)

George Archer "Tug" Wilson (1860 – November 28, 1914) was an American professional baseball player. He played part of one season in Major League Baseball for the Brooklyn Atlantics in 1884, usually either as an outfielder or catcher.

In 24 major league games played, Wilson batted .232, scored 13 runs, and hit four doubles. Following his brief major league career, he continued to play minor league baseball until 1896.

Wilson died in his hometown of Brooklyn, New York, and is interred at Cypress Hills Cemetery.
