= Royce Purinton =

American football coach

Biographical details
- Born: October 27, 1877; West Bowdoin, Maine, U.S.
- Died: March 25, 1919 (aged 41); Lewiston, Maine, U.S.
- Education: Bates (1900)

Playing career

Football
- 1896–1899: Bates
- Positions: Halfback, quarterback

Coaching career (HC unless noted)

Football
- 1901: Carleton
- 1902: Bates
- 1904–1917: Bates

Baseball
- 1902–1917: Bates

Administrative career (AD unless noted)
- 1906–1919: Bates

Royce Davis Purinton (October 27, 1877 – March 25, 1919) was an American college football coach. He served as the head football coach at Bates College in 1902 and from 1904 to 1917. He also coached the Bates baseball team from 1902 to 1917.

== Biography ==
Purinton was born in West Bowdoin, Maine to Nathaniel S. and Jennie (Williams) Purinton. His father was the private secretary to three governors of Maine.

Purinton was captain of the Bates football in 1899. After graduating, he worked for the Pejepscot Paper Company. in 1901, Purington coached the football team at Carleton College in Northfield, Minnesota. He began his coaching career at Bates in 1902. He did not return the following season, but was brought back in 1904. In 1906, he was named physical director of the college. In February 1918, he went to France to work as a physical director for the YMCA. He returned to Bates in January 1919.

Purinton died of heart failure, on March 25, 1919, in Lewiston, Maine. He was survived by his wife, the former Rena A. Dresser of Turner, Maine and a son, Royce Jr. Their daughter, Frances, died of the spanish flu in 1918.
