= Hugh Canavan =

American baseball player (1897-1967)

- Pitcher / Outfielder
- Born: May 13, 1897; Worcester, Massachusetts, U.S.
- Died: September 4, 1967 (aged 70); Boston, Massachusetts, U.S.
- Batted: Left Threw: Left

MLB debut
- April 23, 1918, for the Boston Braves

Last MLB appearance
- July 25, 1918, for the Boston Braves

MLB statistics
- Win–loss record: 0–4
- Earned run average: 6.36
- Strikeouts: 18
- Stats at Baseball Reference

Teams
- Boston Braves (1918)

Hugh Edward Canavan (May 13, 1897 – September 4, 1967), nicknamed "Hugo", was an American pitcher and outfielder in Major League Baseball.

== Playing career ==
He played for the Boston Braves in 1918, appearing as a pitcher in 11 games and compiling an 0–4 record. He also appeared as a pinch-hitter in 4 games, and played one full game as an outfielder. Canavan appeared in a total of 16 games for the Braves; the Braves lost all 16 of those games.

Canavan had a more successful minor league career, where he played mostly as a pitcher with occasional games in the outfield. Playing nine seasons between 1916 and 1927, as a pitcher Canavan won 99 games.
