= Alex Pearson =

American baseball player (1877–1966)

- Pitcher
- Born: March 7, 1877; Greensboro, Pennsylvania
- Died: October 30, 1966 (aged 89); Rochester, Pennsylvania
- Batted: Right Threw: Right

MLB debut
- August 1, 1902, for the St. Louis Cardinals

Last MLB appearance
- August 6, 1903, for the Cleveland Naps

MLB statistics
- Win–loss record: 3–8
- Earned run average: 3.85
- Strikeouts: 36
- Stats at Baseball Reference

Teams
- St. Louis Cardinals (1902); Cleveland Naps (1903)

Alexander Franklin Pearson (March 9, 1877 – October 30, 1966) was a Major League Baseball pitcher who played for two seasons. He played for the St. Louis Cardinals in 1902 and the Cleveland Naps in 1903.
