= Pembroke Finlayson =

American baseball player (1888-1912)

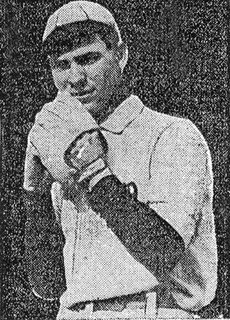
- Pitcher
- Born: July 31, 1888; Cheraw, South Carolina, U.S.
- Died: March 6, 1912 (aged 23); Brooklyn, New York, U.S.
- Batted: Right Threw: Right

MLB debut
- June 6, 1908, for the Brooklyn Superbas

Last MLB appearance
- September 1, 1909, for the Brooklyn Superbas

MLB statistics
- Win–loss record: 0–0
- Earned run average: 11.05
- Strikeouts: 2
- Stats at Baseball Reference

Teams
- Brooklyn Superbas (1908–1909)

Pembroke Finlayson (known as the "Midget Twirler") (July 31, 1888 in Cheraw, South Carolina – March 6, 1912 in Brooklyn, New York) was an American pitcher in Major League Baseball. He pitched in the 1908 and 1909 seasons with the Brooklyn Superbas. While playing in the minors in 1910 he was diagnosed with a serious heart problem and underwent surgery. However, he attempted to return to baseball too soon into his recovery and died in 1912.
