= Walt Thomas =

American baseball player

- Shortstop
- Born: April 28, 1884; Altoona, Pennsylvania, U.S.
- Died: June 6, 1950 (aged 66); Altoona, Pennsylvania, U.S.
- Batted: Right Threw: Right

MLB debut
- September 18, 1908, for the Boston Doves

Last MLB appearance
- October 3, 1908, for the Boston Doves

MLB statistics
- Batting average: .154
- Home runs: 0
- Runs batted in: 1
- Stats at Baseball Reference

Teams
- Boston Doves (1908)

William Walter Thomas (April 28, 1884 – June 6, 1950) was an American professional baseball player. He played part of one season in Major League Baseball for the Boston Doves from 1908. He appeared in five games, all as a shortstop.
