= Irv Porter =

American baseball player (1888–1971)

- Outfielder
- Born: May 17, 1888; Lynn, Massachusetts, U.S.
- Died: February 20, 1971 (aged 82); Lynn, Massachusetts, U.S.
- Batted: Both Threw: Right

MLB debut
- August 20, 1914, for the Chicago White Sox

Last MLB appearance
- August 20, 1914, for the Chicago White Sox

MLB statistics
- Games played: 1
- At bats: 4
- Hits: 1
- Stats at Baseball Reference

Teams
- Chicago White Sox (1914)

Irving Marble Porter (May 17, 1888 – February 20, 1971) was an American outfielder in Major League Baseball. He played for the Chicago White Sox.
