= John Murphy (infielder) =

American baseball player (1879–1949)

John Patrick Murphy
- Infielder
- Born: May 20, 1879; New Haven, Connecticut, U.S.
- Died: April 20, 1949 (aged 69); Andover, Massachusetts, U.S.
- Batted: Unknown Threw: Unknown

MLB debut
- September 10, 1902, for the St. Louis Cardinals

Last MLB appearance
- September 25, 1903, for the Detroit Tigers

MLB statistics
- Batting average: .240
- Home runs: 0
- Runs batted in: 2
- Stats at Baseball Reference

Teams
- St. Louis Cardinals (1902); Detroit Tigers (1903)

John Patrick "Soldier Boy" Murphy (May 20, 1879 – April 20, 1949) was an American infielder in Major League Baseball. He died in 1949 and is buried at the Immaculate Conception Cemetery in Lawrence, Massachusetts.

== Teams ==
- St. Louis Cardinals 1902
- Detroit Tigers 1903

== Sources ==
- Career statistics from Baseball Reference · Baseball Reference (Minors) · Retrosheet · Baseball Almanac
