= 1909 Boston Red Sox season =

Major League Baseball season

1909 Boston Red Sox
- League: American League
- Ballpark: Huntington Avenue Grounds
- City: Boston, Massachusetts
- Record: 88–63 (.583)
- League place: 3rd
- Owners: John I. Taylor
- Managers: Fred Lake
- Stats: ESPN.com; Baseball Reference

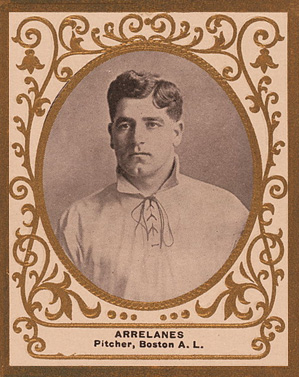
Opening Day pitcher Frank Arellanes

The 1909 Boston Red Sox season was the ninth season in the franchise's Major League Baseball history. The Red Sox finished third in the American League (AL) with a record of 88 wins and 63 losses, 9 1/2 games behind the Detroit Tigers. The team played its home games at Huntington Avenue Grounds.

== Offseason ==
- February 16, 1909: Cy Young was traded to the Cleveland Naps in exchange for pitchers Jack Ryan and Charlie Chech, and $12,500.
- March: The team held spring training in Hot Springs, Arkansas.

== Regular season ==
- April 12: The regular season opens with an 8–1 loss to the Philadelphia Athletics at Shibe Park in Philadelphia.
- April 16: Harry Hooper makes his major league debut.
- April 21: In the home opener, Boston defeats Philadelphia, 6–2.
- May 31: The team's longest losing streak of the season, six games, ends with a road win over Philadelphia.
- August 19: The team's longest winning streak of the season, 11 games, ends with a loss to the New York Highlanders at Hilltop Park in New York City.
- October 5: The regular season ends with home doubleheader against New York; Boston loses the first game, 6–5, then wins the second game, 6–1.

The team's longest game of the season was 12 innings, which occurred three times.

=== Statistical leaders ===
The offense was led by Tris Speaker, who hit seven home runs and had 77 RBIs while recording a .309 batting average. The pitching staff was led by Frank Arellanes with 16 wins, Eddie Cicotte with a 1.94 ERA, and Smoky Joe Wood with 88 strikeouts.

=== Season standings ===
American League
Team	W	L	Pct.	GB	Home	Road
Detroit Tigers	98	54	.645	—	57‍–‍19	41‍–‍35
Philadelphia Athletics	95	58	.621	3½	49‍–‍27	46‍–‍31
Boston Red Sox	88	63	.583	9½	47‍–‍28	41‍–‍35
Chicago White Sox	78	74	.513	20	42‍–‍34	36‍–‍40
New York Highlanders	74	77	.490	23½	41‍–‍35	33‍–‍42
Cleveland Naps	71	82	.464	27½	39‍–‍37	32‍–‍45
St. Louis Browns	61	89	.407	36	40‍–‍37	21‍–‍52
Washington Senators	42	110	.276	56	27‍–‍48	15‍–‍62

The team had one game end in a tie; August 25 at Chicago White Sox. Tie games are not counted in league standings, but player statistics during tie games are counted.

=== Record vs. opponents ===
1909 American League record Sources:
Team	BOS	CWS	CLE	DET	NYH	PHA	SLB	WSH
Boston	—	13–9–1	14–8	9–13	13–9	10–11	13–7	16–6
Chicago	9–13–1	—	8–13–1	6–15–2	14–8–1	12–10	10–12–1	19–3–1
Cleveland	8–14	13–8–1	—	8–14–1	8–14	9–13	14–8	11–11
Detroit	13–9	15–6–2	14–8–1	—	14–8	8–14	18–3–1	16–6–2
New York	9–13	8–14–1	14–8	8–14	—	8–14	13–8–1	14–6
Philadelphia	11–10	10–12	13–9	14–8	14–8	—	14–8	19–3
St. Louis	7–13	12–10–1	8–14	3–18–1	8–13–1	8–14	—	15–7–1
Washington	6–16	3–19–1	11–11	6–16–2	6–14	3–19	7–15–1	—

=== Opening Day lineup ===
Amby McConnell	2B
Harry Lord	3B
Jake Stahl	1B
Doc Gessler	RF
Tris Speaker	CF
Heinie Wagner	SS
Jack Thoney	LF
Bill Carrigan	C
Frank Arellanes	P

=== Roster ===
1909 Boston Red Sox
Roster
Pitchers: Fred Anderson; Frank Arellanes; Fred Burchell; Charlie Chech; Jack Chesbro; Eddie Cicotte; Ray Collins; Charley Hall; Ed Karger; William Matthews; Cy Morgan; Chet Nourse; Larry Pape; Jack Ryan; Biff Schlitzer; Charlie Smith; Elmer Steele; Smoky Joe Wood	Catchers: Bill Carrigan; Pat Donahue; Bunny Madden; Tubby Spencer; Infielders: Babe Danzig; Charlie French; Larry Gardner; Amby McConnell; Harry Lord; Jake Stahl; Heinie Wagner; Harry Wolter; Steve Yerkes	Outfielders: Doc Gessler; Harry Hooper; Paul Howard; Harry Niles; Tris Speaker; Jack Thoney	Manager: Fred Lake

== Player stats ==
=== Batting ===
==== Starters by position ====
Note: Pos = Position; G = Games played; AB = At bats; H = Hits; Avg. = Batting average; HR = Home runs; RBI = Runs batted in

Pos	Player	G	AB	H	Avg.	HR	RBI
C	Bill Carrigan	94	280	83	.296	1	36
1B	Jake Stahl	127	435	128	.294	6	60
2B	Amby McConnell	121	453	108	.238	0	36
SS	Heinie Wagner	124	430	110	.256	1	49
3B	Harry Lord	136	534	168	.315	0	31
OF	Tris Speaker	143	544	168	.309	7	77
OF	Harry Niles	145	546	134	.245	1	38
OF	Doc Gessler	111	396	115	.290	0	46

==== Other batters ====
Note: G = Games played; AB = At Bats; H = Hits; Avg. = Batting average; HR = Home runs; RBI = Runs batted in

Player	G	AB	H	Avg.	HR	RBI
Harry Hooper	81	255	72	.282	0	12
Pat Donahue	65	177	42	.237	2	25
Charlie French	51	167	42	.251	0	13
Harry Wolter	54	121	29	.240	2	10
Tubby Spencer	28	74	12	.162	0	9
Jack Thoney	13	40	5	.125	0	3
Larry Gardner	19	37	11	.297	0	5
Bunny Madden	10	17	4	.235	0	1
Paul Howard	6	15	3	.200	0	2
Babe Danzig	6	13	2	.154	0	0
Steve Yerkes	5	7	2	.286	0	0

=== Pitching ===
==== Starting pitchers ====
Note: G = Games pitched; IP = Innings pitched; W = Wins; L = Losses; ERA = Earned run average; SO = Strikeouts

Player	G	IP	W	L	ERA	SO
Frank Arellanes	45	230 2/3	16	12	2.18	82
Eddie Cicotte	27	162 1/3	14	5	1.94	82
Smoky Joe Wood	24	160 2/3	11	7	2.18	88
Charlie Chech	17	106 2/3	7	5	2.95	40
Ray Collins	12	73 2/3	4	3	2.81	31
Cy Morgan	12	64 2/3	2	6	2.37	30
Charlie Smith	3	25	3	0	2.16	11
Fred Anderson	1	8	0	0	1.13	5
Jack Chesbro	1	6	0	1	4.50	3

==== Other pitchers ====
Note: G = Games pitched; IP = Innings pitched; W = Wins; L = Losses; ERA = Earned run average; SO = Strikeouts

Player	G	IP	W	L	ERA	SO
Elmer Steele	16	75 2/3	4	4	2.85	32
Biff Schlitzer	13	69 2/3	4	4	3.49	23
Ed Karger	12	68	5	2	3.18	17
Charley Hall	11	59 2/3	6	4	2.56	27
Jack Ryan	13	59 1/3	3	3	3.34	24
Harry Wolter	11	59	4	9	3.51	21
Larry Pape	11	57 1/3	2	0	2.04	18
Fred Burchell	10	52	3	3	2.94	12
William Matthews	5	16 2/3	0	0	3.24	6

==== Relief pitchers ====
Note: G = Games pitched; W = Wins; L = Losses; SV = Saves; ERA = Earned run average; SO = Strikeouts

Player	G	W	L	SV	ERA	SO
Chet Nourse	3	0	0	0	7.20	3
