= 1908 Boston Red Sox season =

Major League Baseball season

1908 Boston Red Sox
- League: American League
- Ballpark: Huntington Avenue Grounds
- City: Boston, Massachusetts
- Record: 75–79 (.487)
- League place: 5th
- Owners: John I. Taylor
- Managers: Deacon McGuire (53–62); Fred Lake (22–17)
- Stats: ESPN.com; Baseball Reference

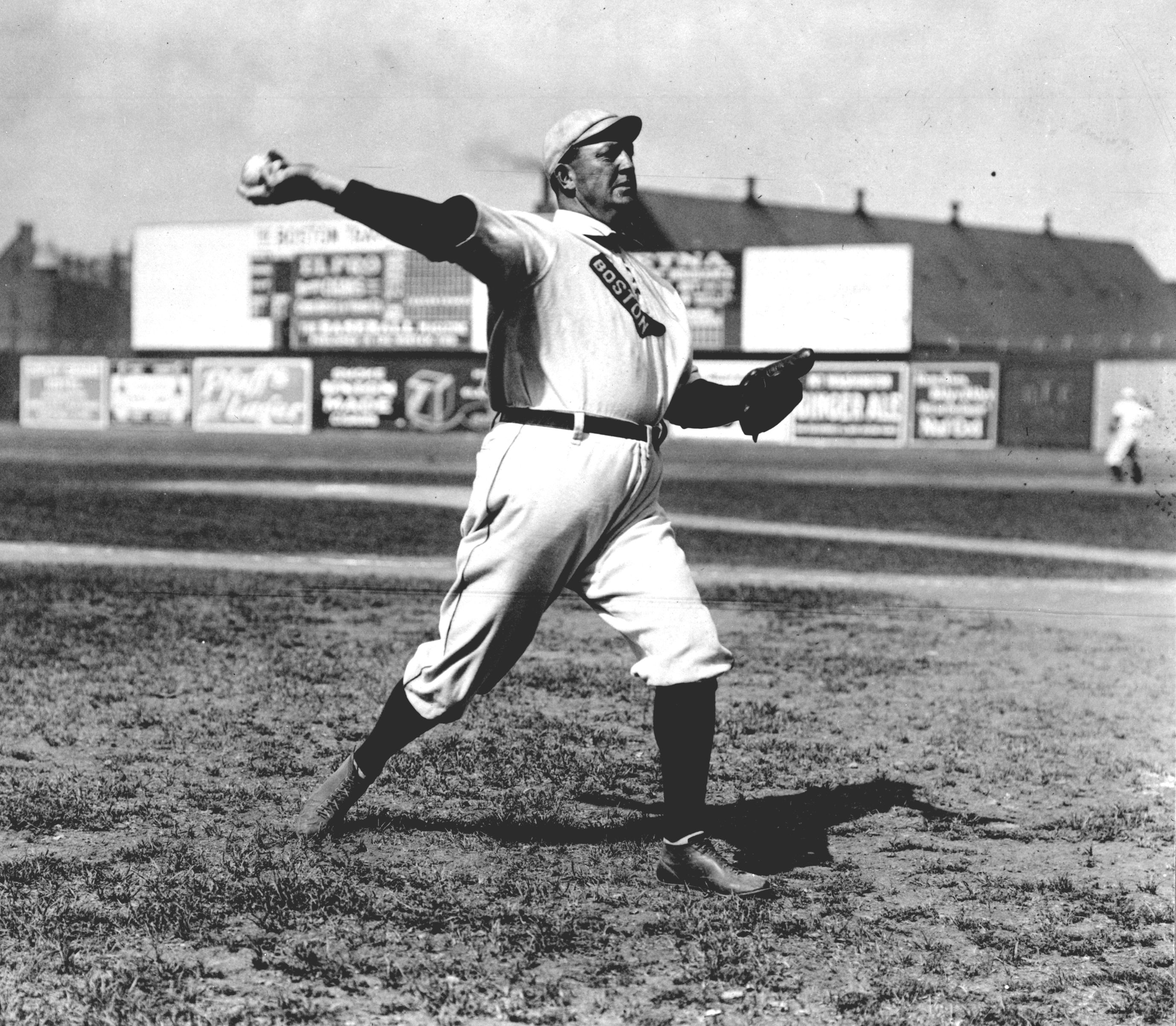
Cy Young on July 23, the day of a home game against the St. Louis Browns.

The 1908 Boston Red Sox season was the eighth season for the Major League Baseball franchise previously known as the Boston Americans. The Red Sox finished fifth in the American League (AL) with a record of 75 wins and 79 losses, 15 1/2 games behind the Detroit Tigers. The team played its home games at Huntington Avenue Grounds.

== Offseason ==
On December 18, 1907, Boston Americans owner, John I. Taylor, seeing that the Boston Nationals had dropped wearing red and instead wore white for the 1907 season, chose to dress his team in red uniform for the 1908 season, further deciding to name his team the Red Sox.

=== Transactions ===
- October 13, 1907: A three-team deal between the Chicago White Sox, the New York Highlanders, and the Boston Red Sox is concluded. The Red Sox send Freddy Parent to Chicago, Chicago sends Jake Stahl to New York, and New York sends Frank LaPorte to Boston.
- August 23, 1907: The Red Sox purchase pitcher Eddie Cicotte from the Western League's Lincoln Links for $2,500.
- November 5, 1907: Second Baseman Hobe Ferris is sold by the Red Sox to the New York Highlanders.
- January 3, 1908: The Red Sox trade catcher Al Shaw to the Chicago White Sox in exchange for catcher Ed McFarland.
- January 30, 1908: The Red Sox send pitcher Rube Kroh to the Johnstown Johnnies.

== Regular season ==
Prior to the regular season, the team held spring training in Little Rock, Arkansas.

- April 14: The regular season opens with a 3–1 home win over the Washington Senators.
- May 18: The team's longest losing streak of the season, seven games, ends with a home win over the Cleveland Naps.
- May 28: The team's longest winning streak of the season, five games, ends with a home loss to the Chicago White Sox.
- June 30: Cy Young throws a no-hitter against the New York Highlanders at Hilltop Park in New York City; at the plate, Young has three hits and four RBIs.
- August 6: In their longest game of the season, the Americans lose to the White Sox, 2–1 in 13 innings at South Side Park in Chicago.
- August 27: Deacon McGuire manages his final games for the team, losing both ends of a doubleheader to the St. Louis Browns, dropping the team's record to 53–62.
- August 27: Catcher Bill Carrigan undergoes a successful operation for appendicitis.
- August 28: Fred Lake manages his first game, a 3–1 win over St. Louis. Under Lake, the team goes 22–17 through the end of the season.
- September 18: The franchise is no-hit for the first time in its history, by Bob Rhoads of Cleveland in a road game played at League Park.
- October 5: The regular season ends with home doubleheader against the Philadelphia Athletics; Boston wins the first game, 10–1, then loses the second game, 5–3 in eight innings.

=== Transactions ===
- June 1, 1908: It is reported that pitcher Jesse Tannehill was traded by the Red Sox to the Washington Senators for Casey Patten.
- June 10, 1908: The Red Sox sign University of Vermont shortstop Larry Gardner.
- July 10, 1908: Jake Stahl is purchased by the Red Sox from the New York Highlanders.
- July 10, 1908: Bob Unglaub is sold by the Red Sox to the Washington Senators.
- July 11, 1908: It is reported that the Red Sox have released Casey Patten.
- July 22, 1908: It is reported that the Red Sox have traded Charles Pruiett for the Cleveland Naps' Jake Thielman.
- July 27, 1908: The Detroit Tigers acquire pitcher George Winter from the Red Sox.
- August 9, 1908: The Red Sox purchase pitcher "Smoky Joe" Wood from the Kansas City Blues.
- August 17, 1908: The Red Sox trade Second Baseman Frank LaPorte to the New York Highlanders in exchange for Harry Niles.
- August 28, 1908: Deacon McGuire resigns as manager of the Red Sox at the request of president John I. Taylor.
- September 1, 1908: The Red Sox draft infielder Charlie French from Evansville in the Rule 5 draft.
- September 2, 1908: The Red Sox draft pitcher King Brady from the Johnstown Johnnies, as well as outfielder Jack Hoey and catcher Tommy Murray from the Trenton Tigers.
- September 20, 1908: Outfielder Denny Sullivan is sold by the Red Sox to the Cleveland Naps.

=== Statistical leaders ===
The offense was led by Doc Gessler who had 63 RBIs, three home runs, and a .308 batting average. The pitching staff was led by Cy Young, who made 36 appearances (33 starts) and pitched 30 complete games with a 21–11 record and 1.26 ERA, while striking out 150 in 299 innings. Cy Morgan had a 14–13 record with 2.46 ERA in 30 games (26 starts). Smoky Joe Wood, who would go on to win 34 games in 1912, made his major league debut on August 24.

=== Season standings ===
American League
Team	W	L	Pct.	GB	Home	Road
Detroit Tigers	90	63	.588	—	44‍–‍33	46‍–‍30
Cleveland Naps	90	64	.584	½	51‍–‍26	39‍–‍38
Chicago White Sox	88	64	.579	1½	51‍–‍25	37‍–‍39
St. Louis Browns	83	69	.546	6½	46‍–‍31	37‍–‍38
Boston Red Sox	75	79	.487	15½	37‍–‍40	38‍–‍39
Philadelphia Athletics	68	85	.444	22	46‍–‍30	22‍–‍55
Washington Senators	67	85	.441	22½	43‍–‍32	24‍–‍53
New York Highlanders	51	103	.331	39½	30‍–‍47	21‍–‍56

The team had one game end in a tie; September 28 at Chicago White Sox. Tie games are not counted in league standings, but player statistics during tie games are counted.

=== Record vs. opponents ===
1908 American League record Sources:
Team	BOS	CWS	CLE	DET	NYH	PHA	SLB	WSH
Boston	—	6–16–1	10–12	11–11	12–10	10–12	15–7	11–11
Chicago	16–6–1	—	8–14–1	9–13	16–6	13–9	11–10	15–6–2
Cleveland	12–10	14–8–1	—	13–9	16–6	16–6–1	11–11–1	8–14
Detroit	11–11	13–9	9–13	—	15–7	14–8–1	12–10	16–5
New York	10–12	6–16	6–16	7–15	—	8–14–1	5–17	9–13
Philadelphia	12–10	9–13	6–16–1	8–14–1	14–8–1	—	8–13–1	11–11
St. Louis	7–15	10–11	11–11–1	10–12	17–5	13–8–1	—	15–7–1
Washington	11–11	6–15–2	14–8	5–16	13–9	11–11	7–15–1	—

=== Opening Day lineup ===
Jack Thoney	LF
Harry Lord	3B
Jim McHale	CF
Doc Gessler	RF
Frank LaPorte	2B
Bob Unglaub	1B
Heinie Wagner	SS
Lou Criger	C
Cy Young	P

=== Roster ===
1908 Boston Red Sox
Roster
Pitchers: Frank Arellanes; King Brady; Fred Burchell; Eddie Cicotte; Ralph Glaze; Charlie Hartman; Doc McMahon; Cy Morgan; Casey Patten; Tex Pruiett; Elmer Steele; Jesse Tannehill; Jake Thielman; George Winter; Smoky Joe Wood; Cy Young	Catchers: Bill Carrigan; Lou Criger; Pat Donahue; Ed McFarland; Harry Ostdiek; Infielders: Larry Gardner; Amby McConnell; Harry Niles; Frank LaPorte; Harry Lord; Jake Stahl; Bob Unglaub; Heinie Wagner	Outfielders: Jimmy Barrett; Walter Carlisle; Gavvy Cravath; Doc Gessler; Jack Hoey; Jim McHale; Denny Sullivan; Tris Speaker; Jack Thoney; Other batters: Deacon McGuire	Managers: Fred Lake; Deacon McGuire

== Player stats ==
=== Batting ===
==== Starters by position ====
Note: Pos = Position; G = Games played; AB = At bats; H = Hits; Avg. = Batting average; HR = Home runs; RBI = Runs batted in

Pos	Player	G	AB	H	Avg.	HR	RBI
C	Lou Criger	84	237	45	.190	0	25
1B	Jake Stahl	78	262	64	.244	0	23
2B	Amby McConnell	140	502	140	.279	2	43
SS	Heinie Wagner	153	526	130	.247	1	46
3B	Harry Lord	145	560	145	.259	2	37
OF	Jack Thoney	109	416	106	.255	2	30
OF	Denny Sullivan	101	355	85	.239	0	25
OF	Doc Gessler	128	435	134	.308	3	63

==== Other batters ====
Note: G = Games played; AB = At bats; H = Hits; Avg. = Batting average; HR = Home runs; RBI = Runs batted in

Player	G	AB	H	Avg.	HR	RBI
Gavvy Cravath	94	277	71	.256	1	34
Bob Unglaub	72	266	70	.263	1	25
Frank LaPorte	62	156	37	.237	0	15
Bill Carrigan	57	149	35	.235	0	14
Tris Speaker	31	116	26	.224	0	9
Pat Donahue	35	86	17	.198	1	6
Jim McHale	21	67	15	.224	0	7
Ed McFarland	19	48	10	.208	0	4
Jack Hoey	13	43	7	.163	0	3
Harry Niles	18	33	8	.242	1	3
Walter Carlisle	3	10	1	.100	0	0
Larry Gardner	3	10	3	.300	0	1
Jimmy Barrett	3	8	1	.125	0	1
Harry Ostdiek	1	3	0	.000	0	0
Deacon McGuire	1	1	0	.000	0	0

=== Pitching ===
==== Starting pitchers ====
Note: G = Games pitched; IP = Innings pitched; W = Wins; L = Losses; ERA = Earned run average; SO = Strikeouts

Player	G	IP	W	L	ERA	SO
Cy Young	36	299	21	11	1.26	150
Eddie Cicotte	39	207 1/3	11	12	2.43	95
Cy Morgan	30	205	14	13	2.46	99
Fred Burchell	31	179 2/3	10	8	2.96	94
George Winter	22	147 2/3	4	14	3.05	55
Elmer Steele	16	118	5	7	1.83	37
Frank Arellanes	11	79	4	3	1.82	33
King Brady	1	9	1	0	0.00	3
Doc McMahon	1	9	1	0	3.00	3
Jesse Tannehill	1	5	0	0	3.60	2
Casey Patten	1	3	0	1	15.00	0

==== Other pitchers ====
Note: G = Games pitched; IP = Innings pitched; W = Wins; L = Losses; ERA = Earned run average; SO = Strikeouts

Player	G	IP	W	L	ERA	SO
Tex Pruiett	13	58 2/3	1	7	1.99	28
Ralph Glaze	10	34 2/3	2	2	3.38	13
Smoky Joe Wood	6	22 2/3	1	1	2.38	11

==== Relief pitchers ====
Note: G = Games pitched; W = Wins; L = Losses; SV = Saves; ERA = Earned run average; SO = Strikeouts

Player	G	W	L	SV	ERA	SO
Charlie Hartman	1	0	0	0	4.50	1
Jake Thielman	1	0	0	0	40.50	0
