= 1906 Boston Beaneaters season =

Major League Baseball season

1906 Boston Beaneaters
- League: National League
- Ballpark: South End Grounds
- City: Boston, Massachusetts
- Record: 49–102 (.325)
- League place: 8th
- Owners: Arthur Soden
- Managers: Fred Tenney

The 1906 Boston Beaneaters season was the 36th season of the franchise. The Beaneaters finished eighth in the National League with a record of 49 wins and 102 losses.

== Regular season ==
=== Season standings ===
National League
Team	W	L	Pct.	GB	Home	Road
Chicago Cubs	116	36	.763	—	56‍–‍21	60‍–‍15
New York Giants	96	56	.632	20	51‍–‍24	45‍–‍32
Pittsburgh Pirates	93	60	.608	23½	49‍–‍27	44‍–‍33
Philadelphia Phillies	71	82	.464	45½	37‍–‍40	34‍–‍42
Brooklyn Superbas	66	86	.434	50	31‍–‍44	35‍–‍42
Cincinnati Reds	64	87	.424	51½	36‍–‍40	28‍–‍47
St. Louis Cardinals	52	98	.347	63	28‍–‍48	24‍–‍50
Boston Beaneaters	49	102	.325	66½	28‍–‍47	21‍–‍55

=== Record vs. opponents ===
1906 National League record Sources:
Team	BSN	BRO	CHC	CIN	NYG	PHI	PIT	STL
Boston	—	9–13	5–17	11–10–1	6–15	6–16	3–19	9–12
Brooklyn	13–9	—	6–16	8–14	9–13	8–13	9–13	13–8–1
Chicago	17–5	16–6	—	18–4	15–7–1	19–3–1	16–5	15–6–1
Cincinnati	10–11–1	14–8	4–18	—	5–16	11–11	8–14–1	12–9–2
New York	15–6	13–9	7–15–1	16–5	—	15–7	11–11	19–3
Philadelphia	16–6	13–8	3–19–1	11–11	7–15	—	8–14	13–9
Pittsburgh	19–3	13–9	5–16	14–8–1	11–11	14–8	—	17–5
St. Louis	12–9	8–13–1	6–15–1	9–12–2	3–19	9–13	5–17	—

=== Roster ===
1906 Boston Beaneaters
Roster
Pitchers: Gus Dorner; Vive Lindaman; William McCarthy; Jim Moroney; Big Jeff Pfeffer; Roy Witherup; Irv Young	Catchers: Sam Brown; Tom Needham; Jack O'Neill; Infielders: Dave Brain; Al Bridwell; Frank Connaughton; Jack Schulte; Allie Strobel; Fred Tenney	Outfielders: Johnny Bates; Jack Cameron; Ernie Diehl; Cozy Dolan; Gene Good; Del Howard; Tommy Madden; Chet Spencer	Manager: Fred Tenney

== Player stats ==
=== Batting ===
==== Starters by position ====
Note: Pos = Position; G = Games played; AB = At bats; H = Hits; Avg. = Batting average; HR = Home runs; RBI = Runs batted in

Pos	Player	G	AB	H	Avg.	HR	RBI
C	Tom Needham	83	285	54	.189	1	12
1B	Fred Tenney	143	544	154	.283	1	28
2B	Allie Strobel	100	317	64	.202	1	24
SS	Al Bridwell	120	459	104	.227	0	22
3B	Dave Brain	139	525	131	.250	5	45
OF	Del Howard	147	545	142	.261	1	54
OF	Johnny Bates	140	504	127	.252	6	54
OF	Cozy Dolan	152	549	136	.248	0	39

==== Other batters ====
Note: G = Games played; AB = At bats; H = Hits; Avg. = Batting average; HR = Home runs; RBI = Runs batted in

Player	G	AB	H	Avg.	HR	RBI
Sam Brown	71	231	48	.208	0	20
Jack O'Neill	61	167	30	.180	0	4
Gene Good	34	119	18	.151	0	0
Jack Cameron	18	61	11	.180	0	4
Frank Connaughton	12	44	9	.205	0	1
Chet Spencer	8	27	4	.148	0	0
Tommy Madden	4	15	4	.267	0	0
Ernie Diehl	3	11	5	.455	0	0
Jack Schulte	2	7	0	.000	0	0

=== Pitching ===
==== Starting pitchers ====
Note: G = Games pitched; IP = Innings pitched; W = Wins; L = Losses; ERA = Earned run average; SO = Strikeouts

Player	G	IP	W	L	ERA	SO
Irv Young	43	358.1	16	25	2.91	151
Vive Lindaman	39	307.1	12	23	2.43	115
Big Jeff Pfeffer	36	302.1	13	22	2.95	158
Gus Dorner	34	273.1	8	25	3.65	104
Jim Moroney	3	27.0	0	3	5.33	11

==== Other pitchers ====
Note: G = Games pitched; IP = Innings pitched; W = Wins; L = Losses; ERA = Earned run average; SO = Strikeouts

Player	G	IP	W	L	ERA	SO
Roy Witherup	8	46.0	0	3	6.26	14
Jack Cameron	2	6.0	0	0	0.00	2

==== Relief pitchers ====
Note: G = Games pitched; W = Wins; L = Losses; SV = Saves; ERA = Earned run average; SO = Strikeouts

Player	G	W	L	SV	ERA	SO
Cozy Dolan	2	0	1	0	4.50	7
William McCarthy	1	0	0	0	9.00	0
