= Lowell Tigers =

- 1901–1911; (1877–1878, 1887–1889, 1891–1893, 1895, 1899, 1901–1911); Lowell, Massachusetts

Minor league affiliations
- Class: Independent (1877–1878, 1887–1889, 1895); Class F (1899); Class B (1891–1892, 1901–1911)
- League: League Alliance (1877); New England Association (1877, 1895); International Association (1878); Atlantic Association (1889); New England League (1877, 1887–1888, 1891–1893, 1899, 1901–1911)

Major league affiliations
- Team: None

Minor league titles
- League titles (4): 1877; 1887; 1888; 1911

Team data
- Name: Lowell Ladies Men (1877); Lowell Lowells (1878); Lowell Magicians (1887); Lowell Chippies (1888); Lowell Lowells (1891–1893); Lowell (1889, 1895); Lowell Orphans (1899); Lowell Tigers (1901–1911)
- Ballpark: River Street Grounds (1877–1878, 1887–1889); Fair Grounds Field (1891–1893, 1895, 1899, 1901); Washington Park (1907–1909; Spalding Field (1902–1906, 1910–1911)

The Lowell Tigers were a minor league baseball team based in Lowell, Massachusetts. From 1901 to 1911, the Lowell Tigers played as members of the Class B level New England League, winning the 1911 league championship.

The Lowell Tigers teams were preceded in minor league play by Lowell teams, who besides the New England League, played as members of the 1877 League Alliance, 1878 International Association, 1889 Atlantic Association and 1887, 1895 New England Association. Lowell teams won league championships in the 1877, 1887 and 1888 seasons.

The Lowell teams hosted home minor league games four different ballparks in the era. Lowell played at the River Street Grounds (1877–1878, 1887–1889), Fair Grounds Field (1891–1892, 1895, 1899, 1901), Washington Park (1907–1909) and two stints at Spalding Field (1902–1906, 1910–1911).

Two Baseball Hall of Fame members played for Lowell teams. Baseball Hall of Fame member Hugh Duffy played for Lowell in 1887, winning the league batting title. Joe Kelley played for Lowell in 1891, in his first professional season at age 19.

The 1912 Lowell Grays continued Lowell's tenure in New England League play.

== History ==
=== Early minor league teams 1877 to 1899 ===
Minor league baseball began in Lowell, Massachusetts in 1877 with a championship team. The Lowell "Ladies Men" played as members of the newly formed New England League, also known as the "New England Association."" The league began play on May 3, 1877, as an eight–team league and ended the season reduced to four teams. The Lowell Ladies Men, with a 33–7 record under manager Josiah Butler, won the championship, finishing 4.0 games ahead of the second place Manchester Reds, who finished with a 29–11 record. Lowell and Manchester were followed by the Fall River Cascades (19–21) and Providence Rhode Islanders (11–29) teams in the final standings. The Lynn Live Oaks (8–22), Fitchburg, Haverhill and Lawrence franchises all folded before the 1877 New England Association season ended on October 15, 1877. The New England Association folded after the 1877 season.

The Lowell and Fall River teams had also been members of the 1877 League Alliance agreement. Lowell finished 12–3 in the alliance contests.

On June 12, 1877, future Baseball Hall of Fame member Pud Galvin pitched for the International Association member Pittsburgh Alleghenies in a League Alliance contest. Galvin pitched Pittsburgh to a 3–2 win over Lowell in the game.

After the New England League season had completed, in November 1877, the Lowell Ladies Men defeated the major leagues' National League champion Boston Red Caps 9–4 in an exhibition contest.

Continuing minor league play in 1878, the Lowell "Lowells" played the season as members of the International Association. The Lowells ended the International Association 1878 season with a record of 15–20, placing sixth in the twelve-team International Association final standings. Josiah Butler returned as manager and Lowell finished 9.0 games behind the first place Buffalo Bisons. The league did not return to play in 1979.

Curry Foley played for Lowell in both the 1877 and 1878 seasons and subsequently advanced to the major leagues. On May 25, 1882, Foley became the first major league player to officially hit for the cycle. In the 1882 game against the Cleveland Blues, Foley hit a home run in the first inning, a triple in the second inning, a single in third inning and a double in the fifth inning in becoming the first to accomplish the feat.

The Lowell "Magicians" continued minor league play in 1887 and won a championship. Bill McGunnigle served as player/manager of the Magicians, who rejoined the New England League after an eight-season hiatus. The Magicians ended the 1887 season with a record of 71–33, finishing first in the New England League. The Lowell Magicians ended the New England League season 3.0 games ahead of the second place Portland team in the final standings of the eight-team league, which had reduced to six teams to end the season. Bill McGunnigle was a leading pitcher on the team and pitched underhanded. Ed Kennedy of Lowell hit 15 home runs to lead the league and Lowell pitcher Henry Burns led the New England League with both 32 wins and 137 strikeouts.

After managing Lowell, Bill McGunnigle became manager of the Brooklyn Bridegrooms, signed by Brooklyn for a salary of $2,500. McGunnigle led Brooklyn to the 1889 and 1890 National League pennants. McGunnigle was best friends with former teammate Jim Cudworth who replaced him as Lowell's manager in 1888.

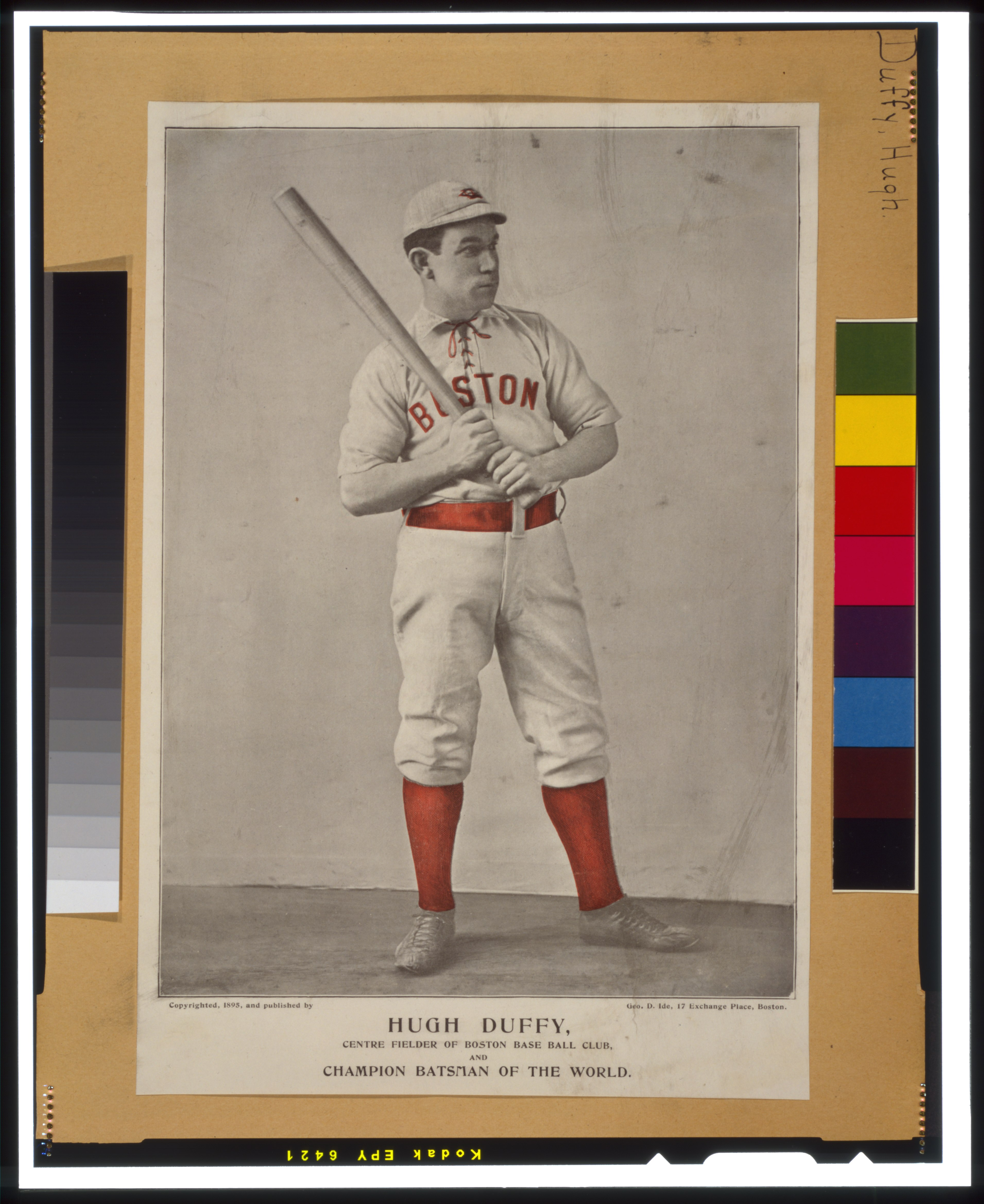
(1895) Baseball Hall of Fame member Hugh Duffy, Boston. Duffy won the league batting title playing for Lowell in 1887.

Baseball Hall of Fame member Hugh Duffy played for Lowell in 1887, coming to the team from after his Salem team folded during the New England League season. Overall, Duffy led the New England League with a .470 average in 1887, Following the season, Duffy was signed by the Chicago White Stockings (today's Chicago Cubs) for a salary of $2,000. Duffy's .440 average in 1894 for the Boston Beaneaters remains the major league record.

The 1888 Lowell "Chippies" won the New England League championship. The Chippies ended the 1888 season with a record of 51-36, placing first in the New England League. Jim Cudworth served as manager. Lowell finished the season 3.5 games ahead of the second place Worcester Grays in the eight-team league to win the championship. Mark Polhemus of Lowell hit a league leading 14 home runs and teammate Ed Kennedy had a league leading 121 hits. Pitcher Henry Burns led the league with 224 strikeouts.

Lowell continued minor league play in a new league in 1889. On July 26, 1889, Lowell pitcher Dick Burns pitched a two-hitter in a game against Worcester. The Sporting Life reported that Burns pitched "a magnificent game" in the contest.

In 1889, the "Lowell" team became members of the eight-team Atlantic Association. Lowell ended the 1889 season with a record of 35-59, placing fifth in the final standings. John Cosgrove, Nate Kellogg and D. A. Sullivan served as the Lowell managers during the season. Lowell finished 23.5 games behind first place Worcester team in the final standings. Lowell's Robert Hamilton won the league batting championship, hitting .341. Hamilton also led the league with 117 total hits. The league folded after the 1889 season.

After not fielding a minor league team in 1890, the 1891 Lowell "Lowells" played rejoined the Class B level New England League. The Lowells ended the season with a 37–29 record, as Lowell finished in fourth place in the eight–team league. Playing the season under manager Dick Conway, Lowell finished 7.0 games behind the first place Worcester team in the final standings.

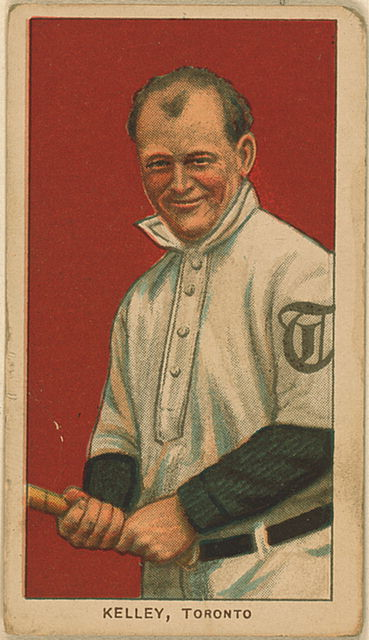
(1909) Baseball Hall of Fame member Joe Kelley. American Tobacco Company baseball card. Kelley played his professional season with Lowell in 1891.

At age 19, Baseball Hall of Fame member Joe Kelley made his professional debut with the Lowell of the New England League in 1891. Kelley played both in the field and as a pitcher. During games he did not pitch, Kelley was in the Lowell lineup as an infielder. Kelley had a 10–3 win–loss record as a pitcher and a NEL-leading .323 batting average with Lowell. Following the end of the New England League season, Kelley made his major league debut with the Boston Beaneaters.

In 1892, Lowell played a partial season, as the Lowells folded during the New England League season. Lowell folded on July 27, 1892. Lowell ended the 1892 season with a record of 30– 30. The Pawtucket team also disbanded on July 27, corresponding with Lowell. Art Whitney and Jim Cudworth served as manager. Woonsocket was the eventual champion of the league, which began the season with eight teams and ended with five.

Lowell began the 1893 season in the New England League, before two relocations of the franchise saw the team end the season based in Boston, Massachusetts with a last place finish. The Lowell/Manchester/Boston Reds of the New England League ended the 1893 season with a record of 29–55, playing in three cities during the season, finishing sixth in the six-team league. Lowell (14–20) transferred to Manchester June 26; Manchester (3–13) moved to Boston July 16. The returning Bill McGunnigle and Thomas H. O'Brien served as managers during the three-city season. The team finished 28.0 games behind the first place Fall River Indians.

The New England League continued play in 1894 without a Lowell or Boston franchise in the eight-team league.

In 1895, Lowell rejoined the eight-team New England Association and placed fourth in the eight–team league, which folded during the season. The league folded on July 8, 1895. With a final record of 24–24, Lowell finished 7.5 games behind the first place Lawrence team in the final standings. Michael Mahoney and Billy Meade managed Lowell in 1895.

In 1899 Lowell briefly gained a team during the season. On May 29, 1899, Cambridge (3-13) moved to Lowell. The team then disbanded on June 1, 1899. The Cambridge/Lowell "Orphans" of the Class F level New England League ended the 1899 season with a record of 4 wins and 16 losses. George Spalding served as manager. The team finished the season as a semi-pro team and had success with future player/manager/owner Fred Lake on the roster.

=== 1901 to 1906 New England League - Lowell Tigers ===
The Lowell Tigers returned to the reformed New England League in 1901. The Tigers played under new owner and manager Fred Lake, who was also constructing a new ballpark for the team. The Augusta Live Oaks, Bangor Millionaires, Haverhill Hustlers, Lewiston, Manchester, Nashua and Portland teams joined Lowell in beginning league play on May 15, 1901.

The Lowell Tigers finished in third place with a 47–47 record. In the final 1901 New England League standings, Lowell finished 9.0 games behind the first place Portland team as the league held no playoffs. The Tigers played the season under manager/owner Fred Lake, who began a five-season tenure with the team. Pitcher Frank Willis was obtained after the Bangor franchise folded on July 6, 1901 and led the New England league with both 18 victories and 160 strikeouts.

The Lowell Tigers played their second season as members as the Class B level New England League in 1902. Construction of Spalding Field was completed, and the Tigers began play at the new ballpark. Lowell finished the season in sixth place in the eight-team league. With a 52–59 record under manager Fred Lake, the Tigers ended the season 22.5 games behind the first place Manchester team in the final standings.

In 1903, Moonlight Graham played for the league champion Lowell Tigers. Graham later became the basis of the character taking his name in the movie Field of Dreams Author W.P. Kinsella first discovered Graham's name and statistical information in The Baseball Encyclopedia and noticed he played just one major league game with 0 at-bats before becoming a physician. Kinsella used Graham's story for a character in his novel Shoeless Joe. In 1989 the story was made into the movie Field of Dreams. In the 1903 season, Graham hit .240 in 89 games with seven triples.

Continuing minor league baseball play, the 1903 Lowell Tigers won the New England League championship under owner and manager Fred Lake. The Tigers placed first in the eight–team, Class B level New England League standings with a final record of 74–41. Lowell finished 4.5 games ahead of the second place Nashua team and 45.5 games ahead of the eighth place Haverhill Hustlers. Tigers pitcher Lem Cross led the New England League with 27 wins.

In defense of their championship the season before, the 1904 Lowell Tigers placed seventh in the New England League final standings. Lowell ended the season with a 59–62 record to place next to last in the eight–team league. The Tigers finished 22.0 games behind the first place Haverhill Hustlers in the final standings, as Haverhill went from last place to first place in the course of two season. The Lowell manager and owner was Fred Lake.

The New England League's Lowell Tigers franchise relocated during the 1905 season. On August 3, 1905, the Tigers moved their franchise to Taunton, Massachusetts. Lowell had compiled a 24–46 record at the time of the move. The team finished the season known as the Taunton Tigers and finished in a distant last place in the eight–team league. After compiling a 4–36 record while in Taunton, the Lowell/Taunton team finished with an overall record of 28–82 to place eighth in the eight-team league. Playing the season under managers Bill Connors and George Grant, Lowell/Taunton finished 41.5 games behind the first place Concord Marines.

In 1906, despite relocating in the previous season, Lowell Tigers returned to New England League play and the league continued as a Class B level league with eight teams. Lowell again finished in last place as Fred Lake returned as manager to begin the season. With a 28–86 record the Tigers placed eighth in the final standings, 45.0 games behind the first place Worcester Busters. The season was the final one with Fred Lake as owner/manager in Lowell.

During the 1906 season, the Lowell franchise was changed when manager Fred Lake gave Alexander Bannwart, a recent Princeton College graduate, a try-out for the team during the season and signed Bannwart to the team. Later in the season, the player Bannwart bought the team and ultimately replaced Lake as manager.

The Tigers had been in a ten-game losing streak before Bannwart joined the team, and manager Fred Lake decided to call him "Al Winn." (some references use this name for Bannwart). "We haven't won a game for ten days, so I'm going to call you Al Winn. Then maybe we can beat somebody," Lake reportedly said to his new player. From July 7 to 13, after joining the team, Bannwart batted 3-for-16 (.188) in the lineup. When the sale of the team was put up to prospective oners, Bannwart then bought the Tigers franchise. On July 20, 1906, Bannwart purchased the franchise for $500 ($17,917 in current dollars). Following a dispute between the two, Bannwart fired Lake in August and named himself as manager of the Tigers for the remainder of the season. In 1907, Bannwart built a new ballpark for the team in the center of town and continued serving as the team's manager.

=== 1907 to 1911 New England League - Lowell Tigers ===
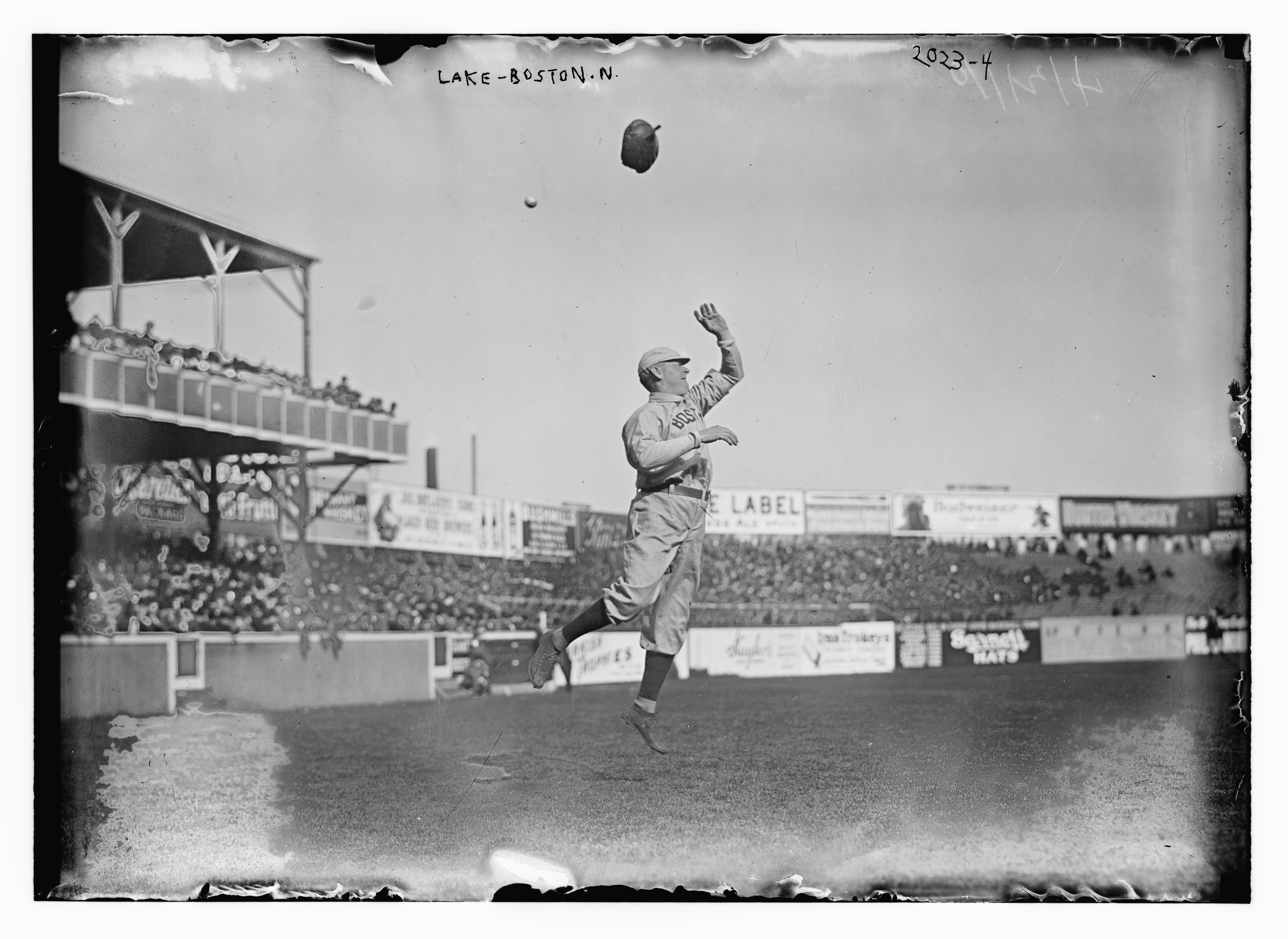
(1910) Fred Lake, Boston, NL. Lake was the owner and manager of the Lowell Tigers. In his five seasons as manager, the Tigers won two championships.

In 1907 Fred Lake did not return as manager, as he played for the Little Rock Travelers and became a scout for the Boston Red Sox. Lake was credited for discovering future Boston Red Sox stars Tris Speaker, Smokey Joe Wood, Harry Hooper and Bill Carrigan in his time as a scout.

The Lowell Tigers moved to a new ballpark for the 1907, a facility spearheaded by owner Alexander Bannwart. The team began play at in Washington Park, a 3,500-seat ballpark. Washington Park was located near the downtown Lowell train station. Construction costs for the new park were estimated at $10,400.

The Lowell Tigers were led by returning owner/manager Alexander Bannwart in 1907. The Lowell Tigers placed sixth in the eight–team New England League final standings. Lowell compiled a 48–60 record in the regular season, finishing 26.0 games behind the first place Worcester Busters. Dave Pickett of Lowell had 116 total hits to lead the New England League.

The 1908 Lowell Tigers were managed by Arthur Daly and Alexander Bannwart as the team finished in seventh place in the New England League standings. Officially listed as Lowell manager, Bannwart delegated supervision of the Tigers to former New York Giants pitcher Jack Sharrott. The Tigers had a 49–75 final record, finishing 31.0 games behind the New England League champion Worcester Busters.

Owner Alexander Bannwart hired Tom Fleming to manage the Tigers team in 1909. During a game in the season, Bannwart he was in charge of the team when an umpire tried to remove the owner him from Lowell's bench. In May 1909, Bannwart fired Fleming and hired Tom Bannon as his replacement as manager of the Tigers. In June 1909, Bannwart publicly announced that he wanted to sell the team. The sale went through at the end of the month.

Although the 1909 team was initially successful in drawing fans, it was said Bannwart had an "abrasive personality" that negatively affected attendance. In the midst of the 1909 season, the New England League forced Bannwart to sell the team. Bannwart sold the team and offered to rent Washington Park to the new owners. The new owners chose to play home games back at their former home of Spalding Park rather than pay rent to Bannwart. The team was sold after a complicated situation was resolved. An injunction was obtained by former Lowell Tigers player (and Harvard Law classmate of Bannwart) Alex O'Brien. O'Brien who had filed a reserve clause-based lawsuit against Winn that slowed negotiations to sell the franchise to former major league outfielder and manager Patsy Donovan. In June 1909, the sale was finalized.

On August 19, 1909, Lowell Outfielder Scott Fluharty was 5–5 at the plate, with two triples and four runs scored, as the Tigers lost to the Fall River Indians 7–6 in 10-innings.

At the conclusion of the 1909 season, the Lowell Tigers again placed seventh in the eight–team Class B level New England League. Managed during the season by Tom Fleming, Tom Bannon and Phenomenal Smith, the Tigers ended the season with a record of 43–81. Lowell finished 34.0 games behind the first place Worcester Busters in the final standings.

On June 22, 1910, John Smith resigned as Lowell's general manager and was replaced in that position by team owner James Gray. Despite never managing or playing baseball, Gray later became the manager of the team. leading Lowell to the 1911 championship. In 1910, Gray still co-owned the team with local tavern owner Andrew Roach and James J. Kennedy.

During the 1910 season, pitcher Jiggs Parson compiled a 12–6 record pitching for Lowell after being acquired during the season. Parson had been sent to Lowell by the Boston Doves after beginning the major league season with Boston. After his record for pitching Lowell, Parson was recalled by Boston to end the season. The Boston Manager was Fred Lake.

The 1910 Lowell Tigers finished in fourth place in the eight-team league, an improvement after seven consecutive seasons of finishing at or near the bottom of the New England League standings. The Tigers finished above .500, with a record of 65–56. Fred Tenney managed the Tigers as Lowell finished 11.0 games behind the first place New Bedford Whalers in the eight-team league.

In 1911, the Lowell Tigers were led by with Jim Gray, in his first season as manager.

Completing a two year turn around for the teams' performance, the 1911 Lowell Tigers won the new England League championship in their final season known as the "Tigers". The Tigers ended the season with a record of 77–46 to place first under new manager Jim Gray. Lowell finished 2.5 games ahead of the second place Worcester Busters in the eight-team league. Cuke Barrows of Lowell won the league batting title, hitting .370, Barrows also led the league with 116 runs scored and 163 total hits.

In defending their league championship, the 1912 Lowell team was renamed after their manager Jim Gray and continued New England League play known as the Lowell "Grays." The Grays continued New England League play through 1915 when the league folded and then were reformed with the league for the 1919 season.

== The ballparks ==
In the era, the Lowell minor league teams played in four different home ballparks.

In the minor league seasons up to 1889, Lowell hosted home games at the River Street Grounds. The ballpark had a capacity of 2,500 and the layout of the field created a short left field line. The ballpark was located on the Merrimack River, which ran just behind the left field fence.

Moving to their second ballpark, in the minor league seasons from 1891 through 1901, Lowell teams played home games at the Fair Grounds Field. The park had grandstands that were also used for horse racing hosted at the facility.

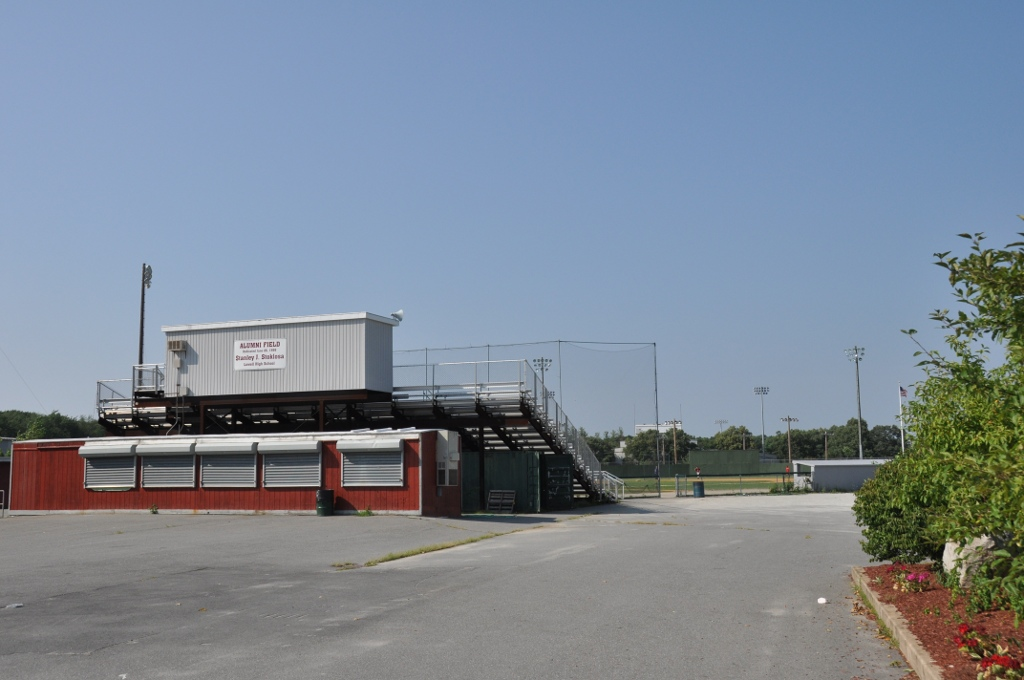
(2012) Stoklosa Alumni Field, Lowell, Massachusetts. The site was formerly home to Spalding Park, which hosted the Lowell Tigers and Lowell Grays in seasons from 1901 to 1919.

Beginning in 1902, The Lowell Tigers played at Spalding Park. Team owner Fred Lake had purchased the property, located at the Atherton Grounds in Tewksbury (which was annexed into Lowell in 1905). The ballpark was built the with a covered grandstand and Lake named it Spalding Park after baseball pioneer A.G. Spalding, who had played games in Lowell for the Boston Red Stockings and Chicago White Stockings in the 1870-s. Upon leering that the ballpark was named after him, Spalding sent Lake some free baseballs for the team. The ballpark opened on May 1, 1902, and hosted the Tigers through 1906 and again from 1910 onward. When the Tigers moved back to Spalding Park following their time at Washington Park, the ballpark needed to be repaired after receiving fire damage. The ballpark was called Spalding Park through 1919. Today, the ballpark site is still in use, known as Stoklosa Alumni Field and is home to the Lowell High School teams.

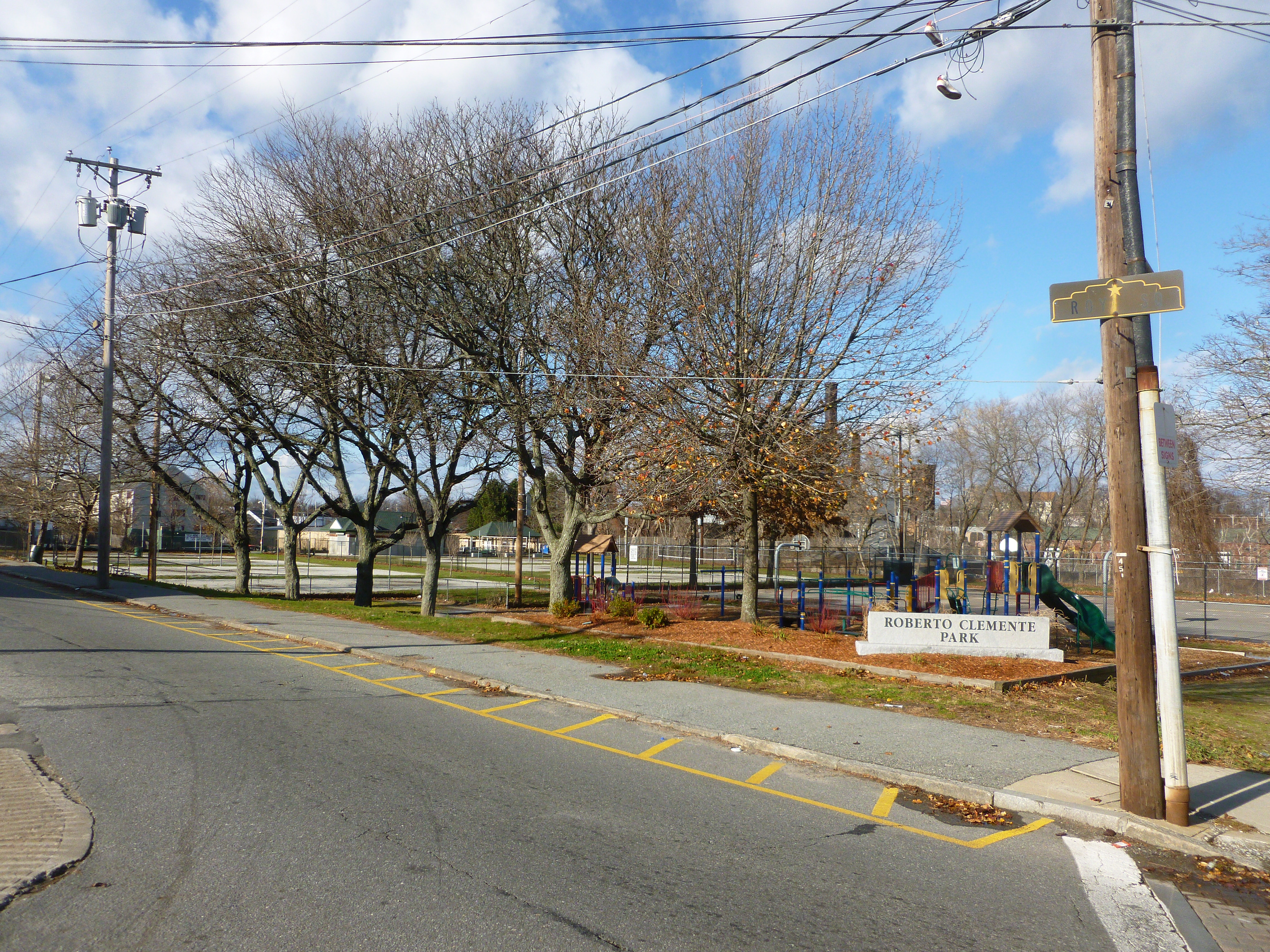
(2011) Clemente Park, Lowell, Massachusetts. The site was formerly Washington Park, home to the Lowell Tigers from 1907 to 1909.

For three seasons, the Lowell Tigers played at Washington Park. In 1907, Lowell Tigers owner Alexander Bannwart (Aka, Al Winn) built the new ballpark for the team. Washington Park officially opened on April 27, 1907. The Tigers played at the ballpark for three seasons before returning to Spalding Park. Bannwart had purchased the park site, which was located in the center of Lowell. Bannwart then spent $15,000 to construct a ballpark on the site. An $8,000 mortgage and help from his family assisted the funding. Once opened, the ballpark had .25 and .35 cent grandstand seats. The ballpark had short distances to the fence due to the location of the ballpark, but it also had high outfield fences. The ballpark had a modern drainage system underneath the field. A Night game was played August 28, 1907, at the ballpark between Lowell and the Cherokee Indians team from Carlisle, Pennsylvania, who brought their own portable lighting system for the game. Following the 1909 season, the new owners of the Lowell Tigers team moved back to Spalding Park rather than pay a $50 per game rental fee at Washington Park to Bannwart.

After the Tigers moved from the ballpark, Washington Park was neglected and eventually torn down. On December 8, 1921, the city of Lowell Board of Park Commissioners took control of the 120,000 square foot parcel by eminent domain for use as a public playground. The city paid $30,800 to Mary L. Saunders, Annie G. Saunders, and Edith St. Loe Saunders, owners of the land itself. Washington Park is still in use as a public park today. In 1973, the park was renamed to Roberto Clemente Park shortly after Clemente's death. Clemente Park is located at 803 Middlesex Street in Lowell, Massachusetts

== Timeline ==
Year(s)	# Yrs.	Team	League	Level	Ballpark
1877	1	Lowell Ladies Men	New England Association	Independent	River Street Grounds
1878	1	Lowell Lowells	International Association	Independent	River Street Grounds
1887	1	Lowell Magicians	New England League	Independent	River Street Grounds
1888	1	Lowell Chippies	New England League	Independent	River Street Grounds
1889	1	Lowell	Atlantic Association	Independent	River Street Grounds
1891–1893	3	Lowell Lowells	New England League	Class B	Fair Grounds Field
1895	1	Lowell	New England Association	Independent	Fair Grounds Field
1899	1	Lowell Orphans	New England League	Class F	Fair Grounds Field
1901	1	Lowell Tigers	New England League	Independent	Fair Grounds Field
1902-1906	4	Lowell Tigers	New England League	Class B	Spalding Field
1907-1909	3	Lowell Tigers	New England League	Class B	Washington Park
1910-1911	2	Lowell Tigers	New England League	Class B	Spalding Field

== Year–by–year records ==
Year	Record	Place	Manager	Playoffs/notes
1877	33–7	1st	Josiah Butler	League champions 12–3 in League Alliance games
1878	15–20	6th	Josiah Butler	No playoffs held
1887	71–33	1st	Bill McGunnigle	League champions No playoffs held
1888	51–36	5th	Jim Cudworth	League champions No playoffs held
1889	35–59	5th	John Cosgrove / Nate Kellogg; D. A. Sullivan	No playoffs held
1891	37–29	4th	Dick Conway	No playoffs held
1892	30–30	NA	Art Whitney / Jim Cudworth	Team folded July 27
1893	29–55	6th	Bill McGunnigle and Thomas H. O'Brien	Lowell (14–20) moved to Manchester June 26; Manchester (3–13) moved to Boston July 16
1895	24–24	4th	Michael Mahoney / Billy Meade	League folded July 8
1899	4–16	NA	George Spalding	Cambridge (3–13) moved to Lowell May 29; Team disbanded June 1
1901	47–47	3rd	Fred Lake	No playoffs held
1902	52–59	6th	Fred Lake	No playoffs held
1903	74–41	1st	Fred Lake	League champions No playoffs held
1904	59–62	7th	Fred Lake	No playoffs held
1905	24–45	8th	Bill Connors / George Grant	Lowell (24-45) moved to Taunton Aug. 3
1906	28–86	8th	Fred Lake / Alexander Bannwart	No playoffs held
1907	48–60	6th	Alexander Bannwart	No playoffs held
1908	49–75	7th	Arthur Daly / Alexander Bannwart	No playoffs held
1909	43–81	7th	Tom Fleming / Tom Bannon; Phenomenal Smith	No playoffs held
1910	65–56	4th	Fred Tenney	No playoffs held
1911	77–46	1st	Jim Gray	League champions No playoffs held

== Notable alumni ==
- Hugh Duffy (1887) Inducted Baseball Hall of Fame, 1945
- Joe Kelley (1891) Inducted Baseball Hall of Fame, 1971
- Eddie Ainsmith (1908)
- Tom Bannon (1909, MGR)
- Alexander Bannwart (1906–1908, MGR)
- Amos Booth (1878)
- Cuke Barrows (1911)
- Ben Beville (1902)
- Bill Bishop (1887)
- Jake Boultes (1910–1911)
- Cal Broughton (1891)
- Fred Brown (1906)
- Dan Burke (1887)
- Dick Burns (1887, 1899)
- Jack Burns (1906–1907)
- Buster Burrell (1906–1907)
- Jack Cameron (1906–1908)
- Fred Carl (1892)
- Scrappy Carroll (1891)
- Dennis Casey (1889)
- Joe Casey (1906)
- Bill Collins (1889)
- Jim Connor (1908)
- Dick Conway (1891, MGR)
- Jim Conway (1878)
- Bill Cooney (1906, 1910–1911)
- Bill Coyle (1895)
- Sam Crane (1877)
- Pat Crisham (1895)
- Lem Cross (1901–1905)
- Jim Cudworth (1887; 1888, MGR; 1892, MGR; 1893)
- Bill Dam (1907)
- Babe Danzig (1909)
- Bill Day (1904–1905)
- Alexander Donoghue (1893)
- Pat Duff (1908)
- Frank Dupee (1902)
- Alex Ferson (1895)
- Ed Flanagan (1889, 1892, 1895)
- Tom Fleming (1909)
- Curry Foley (1877–1878)
- William Gallagher (1902)
- Les German (1889)
- Ed Glenn (1899)
- John Grady (1888)
- Moonlight Graham (1903)
- Chummy Gray (1893)
- Walter Hackett (1889)
- Pat Hartnett (1887)
- Bill Hawes (1877–1878, 1891–1893)
- George Henry (1905)
- Mike Hickey (1901, 1903–1905)
- Bill Higgins (1887, 1891)
- Mike Hines (1895)
- Buck Hooker (1903–1905)
- Charlie Householder (1888)
- Paul Howard (1907–1909)
- Harry Huston (1909–1911)
- Bill Jones (1910)
- Nate Kellogg (1889, MGR)
- Ed Kennedy (1887–1888)
- Lon Knight (1877–1878)
- Fred Lake (1901–1904, 1906, MGR)
- Art LaVigne (1911)
- Al Lawson (1895)
- Jack Lynch (1888)
- Toby Lyons (1888)
- Mike Mahoney (1899)
- Bill Massey (1909)
- Pat McCauley (1892–1893)
- Art McGovern (1904–1905)
- Barney McLaughlin (1888)
- Frank McLaughlin (1887)
- Doc McMahon (1909)
- Bill McGunnigle (1887, 1893 MGR)
- Barney McLaughlin (1892, 1904)
- Bill Merritt (1901–1903, 1905)
- Jim Moroney (1906)
- Allie Moulton (1911)
- Morgan Murphy (1887–1889)
- Tom O'Brien (1893, MGR)
- Frank O'Connor (1895)
- Dan O'Leary (1878)
- Harry Pattee (1905)
- Pat Pettee (1888)
- Jiggs Parson (1910)
- Dave Pickett (1892, 1907)
- Mark Polhemus (1888)
- Martin Powell (1878)
- Joe Quest (1888)
- Frank Quinlan (1899)
- Jack Rafter (1906)
- Jim Riley (1910)
- John Roach (1887)
- Frank Shannon (1906–1908)
- Tim Shinnick (1887–1889)
- Phenomenal Smith (1909, MGR)
- Tom Smith (1893, 1899)
- Louis Sockalexis (1902)
- Bill Sullivan (1887–1889)
- Denny Sullivan (1878)
- Jack Sullivan (1910)
- Sleeper Sullivan (1877)
- Pussy Tebeau (1895)
- Fred Tenney (1911, MGR)
- Doc Tonkin (1905)
- Lefty Tyler (1909–1910)
- Carl Vandagrift (1908)
- Rube Vinson (1909)
- Bill Vinton (1888)
- Joe Wall (1905)
- Art Whitney (1877–1878)
- Frank Whitney (1877–1878)
- Roy Witherup (1906)
- Mellie Wolfgang (1910–1911)
- Arthur C. Woodward (1905)
- Sam Wright (1877–1878)
- Ducky Yount (1910–1911)

== See also ==
- Lowell Tigers players
- Lowell Lowells players
- Lowell Ladies Men players
- Lowell Chippies players
- Lowell Magicians players
- Lowell Orphans players
