= Alexander Bannwart =

Swiss-American businessman (1880–1959)

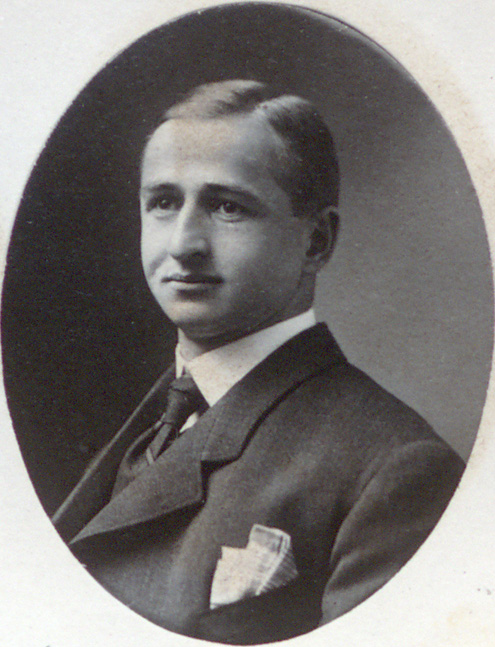
- Bannwart circa 1906
- Born: December 25, 1880; Basel, Switzerland
- Died: February 21, 1959 (aged 78); Jersey City, New Jersey, U.S.
- Other name: Al Winn
- Education: Princeton University (LL.B.)
- Occupation: Businessman

Alexander William Bannwart (December 25, 1880 – February 21, 1959), also known as Al Winn, was a Swiss-American businessman. He was involved in baseball, politics, and real estate.

Bannwart graduated from Phillips Academy and Princeton University. Despite not playing baseball at Princeton, he got a try-out for a team in the New England League in 1906. He bought the team and made himself the manager. After selling the team in 1909, Bannwart tried to form new baseball leagues and became involved in the Colonial League as an agent for Federal League magnates from 1914 to 1915.

In 1917, Bannwart and a group of pacifists went to the United States Capitol to ask their representatives to oppose American entry into World War I. He got into a fistfight with U.S. Senator Henry Cabot Lodge and sued him a year later for slander. Bannwart worked in real estate and advocated for world federalism.

== Early life ==
Bannwart was born on December 25, 1880, in Basel, Switzerland, to Theresa (née Metzger) and Franz Bannwart. His mother was German and his father was Swiss. He had two older siblings, Carl (born 1872) and Emilie (born 1873).

The Bannwart family emigrated to Boston, Massachusetts, when he was a toddler. His father died when he was a teenager. He graduated from Phillips Academy in 1902. Bannwart then attended Princeton University, and graduated with a Bachelor of Laws in 1906. He had played intramural baseball at Princeton, but did not play for the Princeton Tigers. Bannwart enrolled at Harvard Law School, but did not complete his studies there.

== Baseball career ==
=== New England League and Greater Boston League ===
After graduating from Princeton in 1906, Bannwart got a trial opportunity with the Lowell Tigers of the New England League, a Class B minor league, as a second baseman. The team had been in a ten-game losing streak before Bannwart joined, and manager Fred Lake decided to call him "Al Winn". From July 7 to 13, he batted 3-for-16 (.188). When a proposed sale of the team fell through, Bannwart bought the Tigers on July 20 for $500 ($17,917 in current dollar terms). Following a dispute, Bannwart released Lake in August and became manager of the team. In 1907, Bannwart built a new ballpark for the team in the center of town and continued serving as the team's manager.

Bannwart hired Tom Fleming to manage the team in 1909, but later insisted he was in charge of the team when an umpire tried to eject him from Lowell's bench during a game. In May 1909, Bannwart fired Fleming and hired Tom Bannon to manage. In June 1909, Bannwart announced that he wanted to sell the team. The sale went through at the end of the month.

Bannwart worked on the Greater Boston League, a semi-professional baseball league that he spent years trying to develop. It launched in 1912, but did not finish the season.

=== Colonial League ===
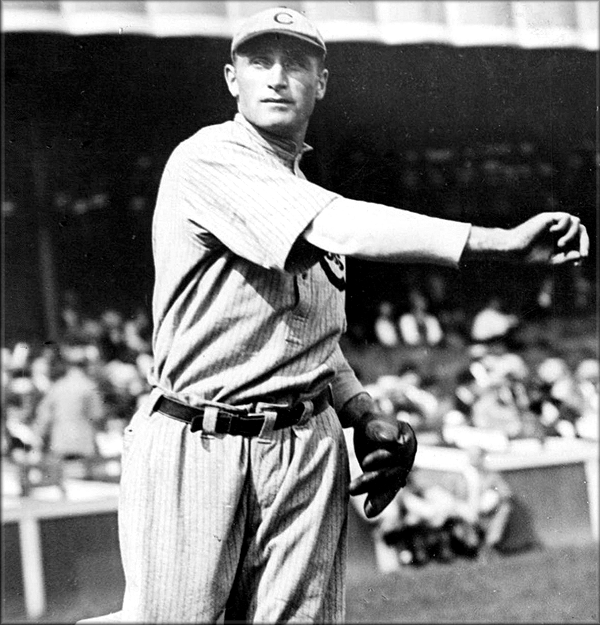
Big Jeff Pfeffer

The Colonial League began to operate as a Class C league based in Southern New England in the 1914 season. In April, Bannwart drew notice by acquiring Fred "Big Jeff" Pfeffer to manage the Pawtucket Tigers team in Pawtucket, Rhode Island. By May, it was suspected that Bannwart was working as an agent of the Federal League, an outlaw league working outside of the National Agreement. Bannwart denied this. Upon these news reports, some of the founding members of the Colonial League resigned, fearing banishment by the National Baseball Commission. In July, Pfeffer assaulted Bannwart and was suspended.

Though Charles Coppen was nominally the president of the Colonial League, Bannwart began to exert authority at the Colonial League offices. Later in the 1914 season, Bannwart drew anger when he attempted to make last minute changes to the schedule designed to increase competitiveness in the standings and maximize profits at the box office. Due to the backlash from the teams, the schedule was not changed. Though the league was reported to have lost $22,000 ($707,143 in current dollar terms) in 1914, Bannwart remained with the league in 1915, though it was reported that his role would be reduced. Instead, he sent teams a directive on selling season tickets, unsuccessfully petitioned the National Commission to reclassify the Colonial League as Class B, and drew up the 1915 schedule.

At the April 1915 league meeting, Coppen was re-elected as president and Bannwart was elected secretary. Walter S. Ward, the treasurer of the Brooklyn Tip Tops of the Federal League and son of George S. Ward, an owner of the Tip Tops, was elected as the Colonial League's treasurer. Wanting to expand into Springfield, Massachusetts, and Hartford and New Haven, Connecticut, territory that belonged to the Eastern Association, the Colonial League reorganized itself as a farm system for the Federal League. and voluntarily withdrew itself from organized baseball. The Colonial League struggled financially in 1915, and Bannwart's policies were blamed. The quality of baseball was deemed to be below the expected standards of a Class C league in part due to the salary maximums set by Bannwart, diminishing fan interest in the league. In August 1915, Bannwart resigned from the Colonial League. The Federal and Colonial leagues both ceased operations during the 1915–16 offseason.

In 1916, Bannwart tried to establish a new Class B league in some of the cities from the Colonial League, including Brockton, Taunton, and Fall River. He obtained the leases to the ballparks used in the Colonial League from the Wards. The teams failed to sell enough tickets to justify launching the league.

== Politics and real estate ==
Bannwart began to idolize Woodrow Wilson when he was a student at Princeton while Wilson served as university president. When Wilson ran for president of the United States in the 1912 presidential election, Bannwart campaigned for him. He was elected president of the Woodrow Wilson Club of Brookline in September 1912 and advocated electing Wilson, a member of the Democratic Party, to Progressive Party political clubs. In 1916, he campaigned for Wilson's re-election and became the secretary of the Woodrow Wilson Independent League.

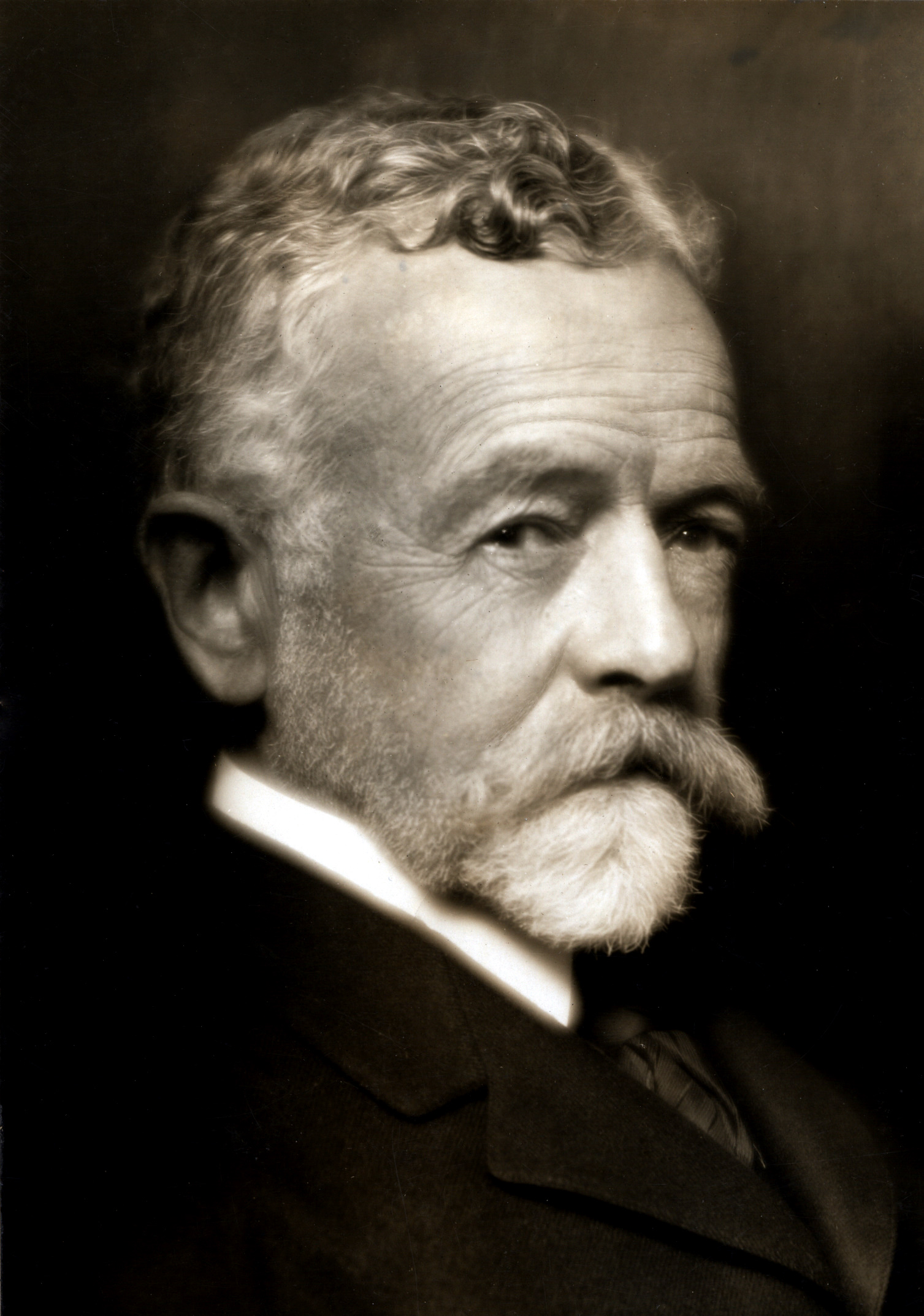
Henry Cabot Lodge circa 1916

Bannwart joined with other pacifists to protest against the proposed American entry into World War I. On a trip to the U.S. Capitol on April 2, 1917, his delegation approached Henry Cabot Lodge, a U.S. Senator from Massachusetts and the leading supporter of the war effort in the Senate, in a corridor. Bannwart and a colleague argued with Lodge, insisting that his constituents opposed the war. According to news reports, the argument escalated and Bannwart called Lodge a "coward". When Lodge responded that Bannwart was a "liar", Bannwart punched Lodge, who punched Bannwart back, setting off a melee among those present. Bannwart was knocked down by a nearby militarist. Bannwart was arrested for assault, but Lodge did not press charges. Bannwart was 36 years old at the time, while Lodge was 67 years old. After reading President Wilson's remarks to Congress, Bannwart changed his opinion, supporting America's involvement in the war. He delivered remarks to the Emergency Peace Federation supporting the war, ending his association with the group.

In 1918, Bannwart sued Lodge for $20,000 ($428,097 in current dollar terms), alleging that Lodge made false and malicious statements about him regarding their altercation. Prior to the 1919 court date, Lodge made a public acknowledgement that he hit Bannwart first, which settled the lawsuit. This is the only known occasion where a U.S. Senator attacked a constituent.

Bannwart resumed working in real estate. In 1919, he was elected president of the Boston Independent Taxi Company. In 1920, Bannwart ran for the 19th district seat in the Massachusetts House of Representatives in the primary elections for the Democratic and Republican Party, losing in both.

In 1924, Bannwart bought a mansion on Commonwealth Avenue in the Back Bay neighborhood of Boston, and set up a "Millionaire for a Day" promotion, allowing people to rent the furnished mansion with butlers and maids included. In December 1924, he and two others were cited for running an unlicensed dance hall out of the Back Bay mansion. He was found guilty and fined $25 ($470 in current dollar terms). Bannwart appealed the conviction and changed his plea to nolo contendere and paid the fine. In 1927, Bannwart sold the house, which was appraised at $53,000 ($982,328 in current dollar terms).

After World War II, Bannwart became involved in the World Federation Movement. He gave lectures that advocated for the establishment of the Federal Union Plan, which would unite the United States with other liberal democracies on the basis of principles of the United States Constitution.

Bannwart's sister died in October 1950. Her will provided an income to Carl and money to Gordon B. Hanlon, but Alexander was disinherited from her $100,000 estate ($1,338,174 in current dollar terms). He contested the will in court, as did the Boston Community Church, which had also been disinherited. They settled the suit, which removed Hanlon as an executor and trustee.

Bannwart died on February 21, 1959, in Jersey City, New Jersey.

== See also ==
- List of Phillips Academy alumni
- List of Princeton University people
