= William McCarthy (baseball) =

American baseball player

- Pitcher
- Born: April 11, 1882; Ashland, Massachusetts, U.S.
- Died: May 29, 1939 (aged 57); Boston, Massachusetts, U.S.
- Batted: Right Threw: Right

MLB debut
- April 21, 1906, for the Boston Beaneaters

Last MLB appearance
- April 21, 1906, for the Boston Beaneaters

MLB statistics
- Win–loss record: 0–0
- Earned run average: 9.00
- Strikeouts: 0
- Stats at Baseball Reference

Teams
- Boston Beaneaters (1906)

William Thomas McCarthy (April 11, 1882 – May 29, 1939) was an American professional baseball pitcher. He appeared in one major-league game, pitching two innings in one game for the 1906 Boston Beaneaters. In that game, he gave up two earned runs on two hits and three walks.

== Sources ==
- Career statistics from Baseball Reference · Retrosheet · Baseball Almanac
- Stats at Baseball-Almanac
