= Jiggs Donahue =

American baseball player (1879–1913)

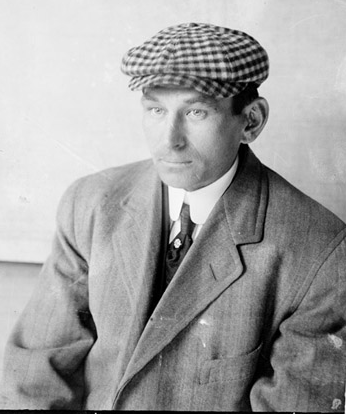
- First baseman
- Born: July 13, 1879; Springfield, Ohio, U.S.
- Died: July 19, 1913 (aged 34); Columbus, Ohio, U.S.
- Batted: Left Threw: Left

MLB debut
- September 10, 1900, for the Pittsburgh Pirates

Last MLB appearance
- October 2, 1909, for the Washington Senators

MLB statistics
- Batting average: .255
- Home runs: 4
- Runs batted in: 327
- Stats at Baseball Reference

Teams
- Pittsburgh Pirates (1900–1901); Milwaukee Brewers / St. Louis Browns (1901–1902); Chicago White Sox (1904–1908); Washington Senators (1909)

Career highlights and awards
- World Series champion (1906)

John Augustine Donahue (July 13, 1879 – July 19, 1913) was an American professional baseball first baseman and catcher. He played in Major League Baseball (MLB) with the Pittsburgh Pirates, Milwaukee Brewers / St. Louis Browns, Chicago White Sox and Washington Senators between 1900 and 1909. He batted and threw left-handed.

== Career ==
Donahue first played professionally in 1897, for teams minor-league teams located in Wheeling, West Virginia, and Marietta, Ohio. He played at the Class B level through 1900, primarily in the Interstate League.

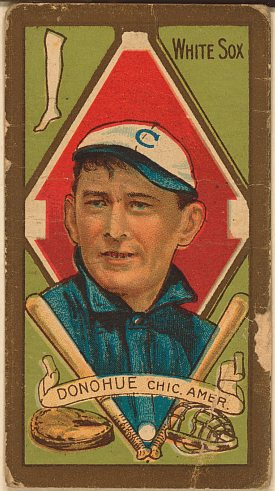
Donahue baseball card from 1911

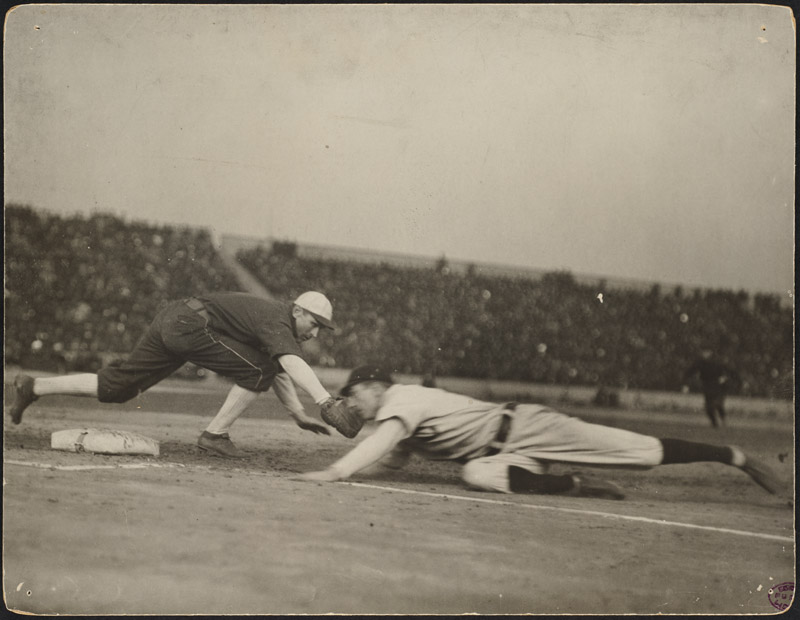
Donahue attempting to tag Frank Chance in a pickoff play during the 1906 World Series; Chance slid back safely

Donahue first played in the major leagues in 1900, appearing in three games for the Pittsburgh Pirates, while also playing in the minor leagues in Dayton, Ohio. In 1901, Donahue split time between the Minneapolis Millers, a Class A minor-league team, the Pirates of the National League (2 games), and the Milwaukee Brewers in the debut season of the American League (37 games). The Brewers relocated after the season, becoming the St. Louis Browns, whom Donahue played 30 games for in 1902, while also playing in 40 games for the minor-league Milwaukee Brewers of the American Association. He spent 1903 exclusively playing for the minor-league Brewers, recording a .342 batting average in 123 games.

Records of the era, while incomplete, show Donahue played as an outfielder, catcher, and first baseman before 1903; in 1903 and later, he exclusively played as a first baseman.

Donahue had his greatest success from 1904 to 1908, with the Chicago White Sox. His defensive skills were a key to the team's 1906 championship, and he led American League first basemen in fielding percentage, assists, and putouts for three consecutive seasons, from 1905 to 1907. In 1907, Donahue had 1,846 putouts, which remains the single-seasons record for most putouts by any major-league player at any position. Donahue also holds the major-league single-season record for range factor, averaging 12.65 chances accepted per game in 1907.

Though known mostly for his fielding, Donahue was also an effective hitter from 1905 to 1907. In 1905, he was among the American League leaders in batting average (.287), on-base percentage (.346), runs batted in (RBIs) (76), and stolen bases (32). In 1906, Donahue was among the league leaders in stolen bases (36) and sacrifice hits (36), and was one of only three White Sox starters to bat over .250 for that season's major-league champions, nicknamed the "Hitless Wonders." In 1907, Donahue led the league in games played (157) and at bats (609) and was among the leaders in hits (158) and RBIs (68).

In the 1906 World Series, Donahue hit for a .278 average (5-for-18) with 2 doubles, 1 triple and 4 RBIs. In Game 2 on October 10, Donahue broke up a no-hit bid by Cubs pitcher Ed Reulbach with a single in the seventh inning, the only hit of the game by a member of the White Sox. Against the Detroit Tigers on May 31, 1908, Donahue recorded 21 putouts in a nine-inning game; one short of the major-league record.

Donahue's final major-league season was 1909, when he played two games for the White Sox and 84 games with the Washington Senators, batting .233 for the season. In a nine-season major-league career, Donahue played in 813 games with 731 hits, 319 runs scored, 327 RBIs, 143 stolen bases, 90 doubles, 31 triples, 4 home runs, and a .255 batting average.

After not playing in 1910, Donahue served as manager of the minor-league Galveston Sand Crabs for part of the 1911 season, while also playing in 14 games for the team. He was also manager of the minor-league Cleburne Railroaders for part of the season.

== Personal life ==
Donahue was born in 1879 in Springfield, Ohio. A younger brother, Pat Donahue, was a major-league catcher during 1908–1910. Another younger brother, Frank, played in the minor leagues during 1905–1912. Donahue and his wife, Alice, who married in August 1905, were divorced in December 1911; they were living in Hot Springs, Arkansas, at the time of their divorce. News reports in July 1912 stated that Donahue had been moved to a "state hospital for the insane" after suffering from "a nervous trouble", syphilis. He died in July 1913 at age 34; his passing was front-page news in his hometown of Springfield.
