= Fred Lake =

Canadian baseball player (1866–1931)

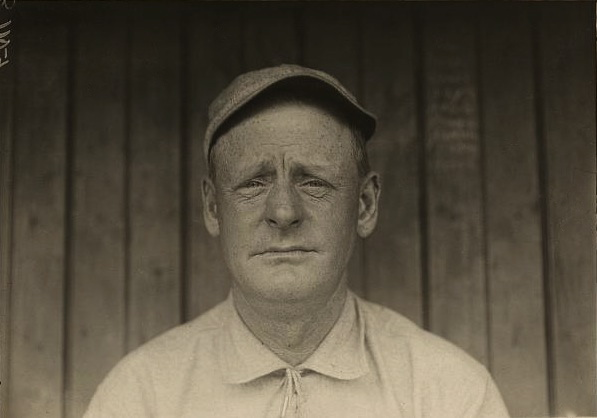
- Catcher
- Born: October 16, 1866; Cornwallis Township, Nova Scotia, Canada
- Died: November 24, 1931 (aged 65); Boston, Massachusetts, U.S.
- Batted: Right Threw: Right

MLB debut
- May 7, 1891, for the Boston Beaneaters

Last MLB appearance
- May 28, 1910, for the Boston Doves

MLB statistics
- Batting average: .232
- Home runs: 1
- Runs batted in: 16
- Stats at Baseball Reference

Teams
- Boston Beaneaters (1891); Louisville Colonels (1894); Boston Beaneaters (1897); Pittsburgh Pirates (1898); Boston Doves (1910)

Frederick Lovett Lake (October 16, 1866 – November 24, 1931) was a Canadian professional baseball catcher and Major League manager for Boston American and National leagues teams in the early 20th century.

Lake hailed from Cornwallis Township, Kings County, Nova Scotia. His professional debut came with the Boston Beaneaters in 1891, but he was in and out of the Major Leagues, amassing a total of 125 at-bats in five seasons. He was hired as manager of the Boston Red Sox in 1908, though he was replaced after the 1909 season despite leading the Sox to a third-place finish. Shortly after, he was hired by the crosstown Boston Doves, but in his only season for them, he finished 53–100, 50 1/2 games behind the pennant-winning Chicago Cubs.

In addition, Lake played or managed in the minor leagues in part of 11 seasons spanning 1896–1926. Lake was a long time resident of Boston, where he died at the age of 65.

== Early life ==
Lake was the fourth child of Nova Scotians Wesley and Julia Lake. Before having Fred in 1866, the couple had given birth to their first child, Edgar James, their second son, Rupert, and daughter Alice. The family moved to Boston in 1868, when Fred was 2, and had three more children, Walter, Nellie, and Charles. Wesley died on May 31, 1879, leaving Julia to raise her seven children alone in East Boston. As a young teenager, Fred was dependent on his mother as well as his two older brothers who had jobs in a local pottery factory. He attended the local elementary and high school where he learned to play baseball.

== Professional career ==
=== Early career ===
Aptly nicknamed the "baseball tourist", Fred Lake spent his baseball career frequently changing both leagues and teams. He began his career at the age of 20 after joining the Salem (Massachusetts) Baseball Club. He did not stay for long, though, and moved on to teams in Dover, New Hampshire, and Hingham, Massachusetts. According to the Hingham Journal, his season with the team was the best one they had had up to that time. In 1890 he joined the New Brunswick Provincial League back in Canada and was hired as the captain and manager of the Moncton team. After a successful season, he was recruited for the National League Boston Beaneaters and joined the team as a back-up player for the 1891 season.

After his first season in the major league with the Beaneaters, he went back to the minor league for two seasons with Milwaukee and Wilkes-Barre. He then rejoined the National League in 1894 with the Louisville Colonels, again as a back-up. In 1895 he went back to the minor leagues with Toronto, followed by a season with Kansas City in 1896. In 1897 he rejoined the Beaneaters and played with them for one season before joining the Pittsburgh Pirates for the 1898 season.

In 1899, he left the major league again and played semi-pro for Lowell, Massachusetts, and led the team to the New England League championship. He stayed with the Lowell Tigers until 1905, and then joined New Bedford, then Lawrence, and was back with Lowell by 1906. He gave Alexander Bannwart, a recent Princeton graduate, a try-out. Later in the season, Bannwart bought the team and released Lake.

In 1907 he played for Little Rock, Arkansas, and became a scout for the Boston Red Sox. Lake was credited for discovering some great players such as Tris Speaker, Smokey Joe Wood, Harry Hooper and Bill Carrigan.

=== Boston Red Sox ===
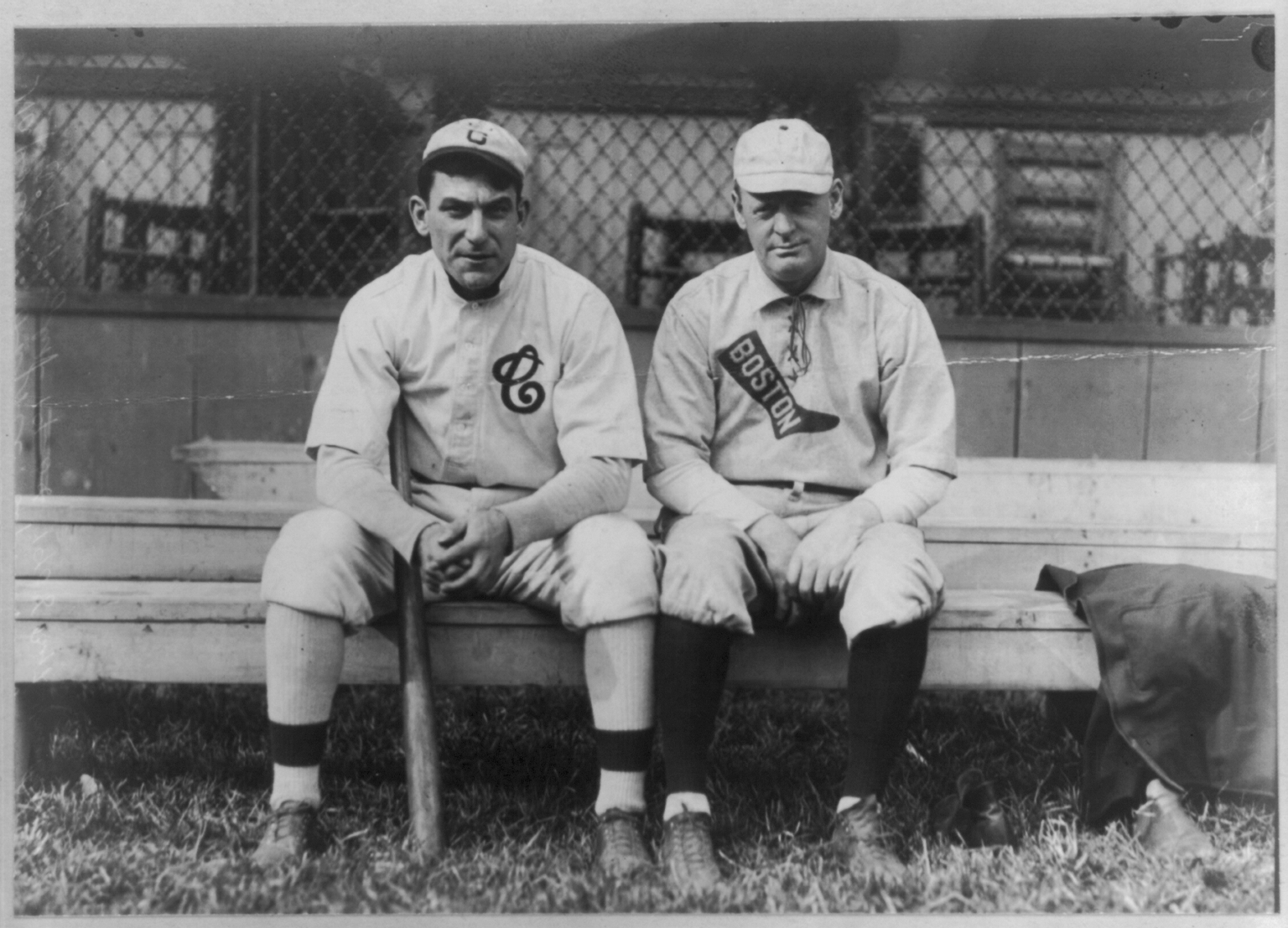
Napoleon Lajoie (left) and Lake (right) in 1908

In 1908, at the age of 41, Lake's career took a dramatic turn when he was hired to replace Red Sox manager Deacon McGuire, under whom the team was floundering. Lake took over in late August and led the team to a 22–17 record through the end of the season; the Red Sox finished in fifth place, as their overall record for the season was 75–79. Two well-known players on the 1908 Red Sox were Cy Young and Smoky Joe Wood. Lake continued as manager of the 1909 Red Sox and advanced the team to third place, with a record of 88–63. That season, Lake had added rookie and future Hall of Famer Harry Hooper to the team as well as moving Tris Speaker to full-time in center field. After the season, Lake asked team owner John I. Taylor for a raise, but his request was denied by Taylor, who claimed that the team's success had nothing to do with Lake's managing. Due to their stubbornness on the issue, Lake was replaced as manager before the 1910 season.

=== Boston Doves ===
After leaving the Red Sox, Lake took over the Boston Beaneaters, nicknamed the Doves, which are now the Atlanta Braves. However, he struggled to bring the same success to the Doves that he had achieved with the Red Sox because the players were not as talented. In 1909 the team finished 45–108, and in 1910 they finished 53–100 in 8th place. Despite the unsuccessful season, an interesting story was published about Lake in the Mansfield (Ohio) News on October 4.

In New York the other day, several hundred orphans were guests at the Polo Grounds. The Giants were facing the Doves and the score was close. Lake became upset with an umpire's call and told the umpire how wrong he was. He was ejected from the game. The orphans cheered this and then said some unkind words to Mr. Lake. The manager did not become angry. He smiled, walked over to where the orphans were. He opened his traveling bag and began to throw baseballs up to the kids. The jeers turned to cheers and the children turned their insulting comments towards the umpire.

=== St. Louis Browns ===
After 1910 Lake resigned from the Doves and a new manager was hired, there was talk of Lake taking over to manage the St. Louis Browns. However, the Doves would not release him from his contract, so he was hired as Chief Scout for the Browns. However, Lake was frustrated by the lack of skilled minor league players that year and the Browns only ended up hiring three of the players he had scouted. In the October 18, 1911 Colorado Springs Gazette, Lake summarizes his frustration:

The low quality of minor league players is a result of the early picking of players a year ago. The promising players of 1910 were taken too early and the result is this year's crop is way below the big league standard. My idea of scouting is to stay off men who you know will not prosper in the big leagues and buy up only the players who you feel will make good when tried out. I have worked with that idea in view. There are many players who are hitting and fielding well in the minors but they lack the qualifications necessary for a major league player. For that reason there is little reason for lining up a player of that stripe.

Lake left the Browns after the 1911 season.

=== Late career ===
Lake moved on to the International League in 1912 as manager of the Providence team. In 1913 he managed the New Bedford Whalers of the New England League, and moved the team to become the Fitchburg in 1914 due to poor attendance. However, within days of opening, Lake moved the team to Manchester, New Hampshire, again due to poor attendance and the team became the Manchester Textiles. The club finished the season in last place, causing Lake to sell the club to former Dartmouth athlete and coach of the Lehigh University squad, Tom Keady, in 1915.

Lake began coaching in 1916 for Colby College in Maine, and for Tufts University in Boston a few years later. In 1925 he was hired to coach the Harvard University Seconds.

At 61 years old in 1926, Lake returned to managing with the Nashua Millionaires franchise of the New England League. However, he soon stepped down and gave the team to Walter Keating, instead choosing to stay on as vice-president and scout for the team.

== Managerial record ==
| Team | Year | Regular season | | | | | Postseason | | | |
| Team | Year | Games | Won | Lost | Win % | Finish | Won | Lost | Win % | Result |
|---|---|---|---|---|---|---|---|---|---|---|
| BOS | 1908 | 39 | 22 | 17 | .564 | 5th in AL | – | – | – | – |
| BOS | 1909 | 151 | 88 | 63 | .583 | 3rd in AL | – | – | – | – |
| BOS total | | 190 | 110 | 80 | .579 | | 0 | 0 | – | |
| BOD | 1910 | 153 | 53 | 100 | .346 | 8th in NL | – | – | – | – |
| BOD total | | 153 | 53 | 100 | .346 | | 0 | 0 | – | |
| Total | | 343 | 163 | 180 | .475 | | 0 | 0 | – | |

== Family life and death ==
By 1900, Lake had married his wife Lydia Griffin and the couple had had four daughters. Shortly after 1900 Griffin gave birth to their first son and final child, Fred Jr.

In November 1931, after an extremely unstable life and career, Lake was admitted to New England Deaconess Hospital in Boston where he died due to heart problems on November 24, 1931. He is buried in Oak Grove Cemetery in Medford, Massachusetts.

His wife, Lydia, survived him for another 13 years, dying on September 25, 1944. In the 1930 U.S. Census, his son, Fred Lake Jr. was listed as living with his wife Myrtle and son Fred Lake III in Quincy, Massachusetts.

== See also ==
- List of Major League Baseball player–managers
