= Stoklosa Alumni Field =

Baseball field in Lowell, Massachusetts

- Alumni Field
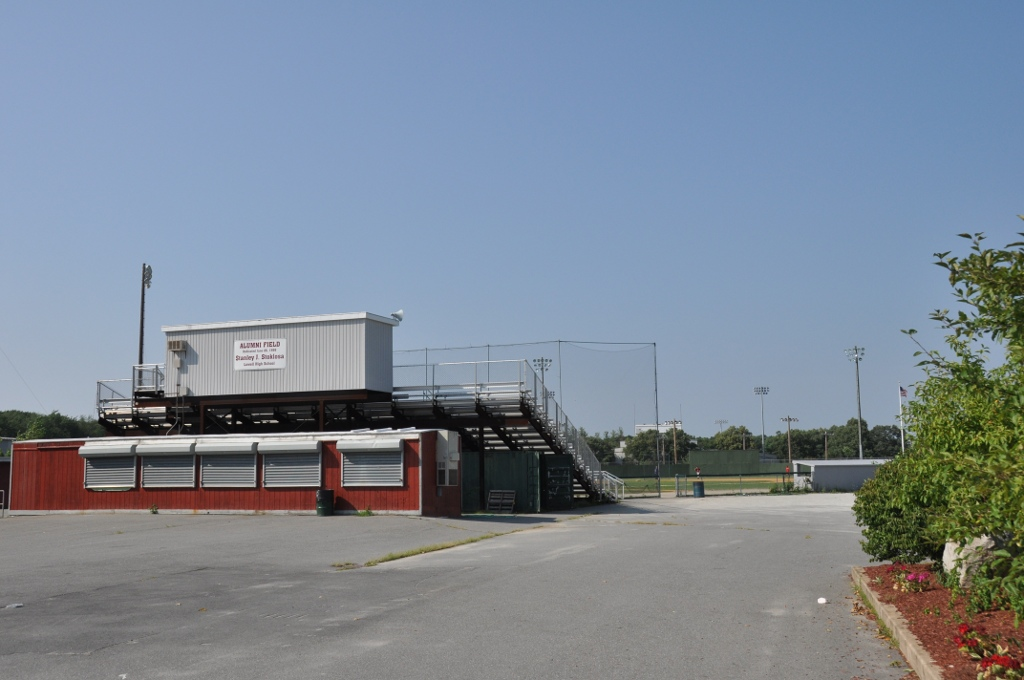
- Interactive map of Stoklosa Alumni Field
- Location: Rogers Street and Village Street, Lowell, Massachusetts, United States
- Coordinates: 42.6309°N 71.2775°W
- Capacity: 4,000
- Field size: Right: 275

Construction
- Opened: 1996

Tenants
- Lowell Tigers/Lowell Grays (New England League) (1902-1907, 1910-1915); Lowell All-Americans (NECBL) (2000-2010); Lowell Spinners (NYPL) (1996-1997); Lowell High School baseball

Stoklosa Alumni Field is a baseball field in Lowell, Massachusetts, United States. Originally opened on May 1, 1902, it was rebuilt in 1996 as a temporary home of the Lowell Spinners. The Spinners played at the field for the 1996 and 1997 seasons before moving to Edward A. LeLacheur Park on UMass Lowell's east campus. The field was also home to the Lowell All-Americans of the New England Collegiate Baseball League between 2000 and 2010. Following the 2010 season, the franchise moved to Old Orchard Beach, Maine.

The stadium has been home to multiple teams, initially housing the Lowell Tigers from 1902 to 1905. It was then vacant until 1910 when the Lowell Grays moved in. They left in 1919, and after being used partially by multiple other teams until 1922, including the Salem Witches after their move, it was unused until 1996 when the Lowell Spinners began to use it.

The venue is currently used by the Lowell High School varsity baseball team. It holds 4,000 people.
