= Sam Brown (baseball) =

American baseball player (1878–1931)

- Catcher
- Born: May 21, 1878; Webster, Pennsylvania, U.S.
- Died: November 8, 1931 (aged 53); Mount Pleasant, Pennsylvania, U.S.
- Batted: Right Threw: Right

MLB debut
- April 21, 1906, for the Boston Beaneaters

Last MLB appearance
- October 5, 1907, for the Boston Doves

MLB statistics
- Batting average: .200
- Home runs: 0
- Runs batted in: 34
- Stats at Baseball Reference

Teams
- Boston Beaneaters/Doves (1906–1907)

Samuel Wakefield Brown (May 21, 1878 – November 8, 1931) was an American professional baseball player. He was a catcher for two seasons (1906–07) with the Boston Beaneaters/Doves. For his career, he compiled a .200 batting average with 34 runs batted in.

An alumnus of Grove City College, he was born in Webster, Pennsylvania and later died in Mount Pleasant, Pennsylvania at the age of 53.
