= Charlie Hartman =

American baseball player (1888–1960)

- Pitcher
- Born: August 10, 1888; Los Angeles, California
- Died: October 22, 1960 (aged 72); Los Angeles, California
- Batted: Unknown Threw: Left

MLB debut
- June 24, 1908, for the Boston Red Sox

Last MLB appearance
- June 24, 1908, for the Boston Red Sox

MLB statistics
- Win–loss record: 0–0
- Strikeouts: 1
- Earned run average: 4.50
- Stats at Baseball Reference

Teams
- Boston Red Sox (1908)

Charles Otto Hartman (August 10, 1888 – October 22, 1960) was a left-handed pitcher in Major League Baseball who played briefly in the American League during the 1908 season.

Hartman made his professional baseball debut in 1906 with the Fresno Raisin Eaters of the Pacific Coast League. He split that season between Fresno and the Seattle Siwashes. In 1907, he pitched for the Portland Beavers, compiling a record of 11–14 with a 2.82 ERA. His performance caught the attention of the Boston Red Sox, for whom he made his only major league appearance on June 24, 1908, as a reliever. In two innings of work, he allowed one earned run with one strikeout and two walks and never appeared in a professional baseball game again.

Hartman died in his home-town of Los Angeles, California, at the age of 72.

== Sources ==
- Career statistics from Baseball Reference · Baseball Reference (Minors) · Retrosheet · Baseball Almanac
- Retrosheet
