= Gene Good =

American baseball player (1882-1947)

- Outfielder
- Born: December 13, 1882; Roxbury, Massachusetts, U.S.
- Died: August 6, 1947 (aged 64); Boston, Massachusetts, U.S.
- Batted: Left Threw: Right

MLB debut
- April 12, 1906, for the Boston Beaneaters

Last MLB appearance
- September 4, 1906, for the Boston Beaneaters

MLB statistics
- Batting average: .151
- Home runs: 0
- Runs batted in: 0
- Stats at Baseball Reference

Teams
- Boston Beaneaters (1906)

Eugene Joseph Good (December 13, 1882 – August 6, 1947) was an American Major League Baseball outfielder.
