= Tom Bannon =

American baseball player and manager (1869–1950)

- Outfielder / First baseman
- Born: May 8, 1869; Amesbury, Massachusetts, U.S.
- Died: January 26, 1950 (aged 80); Lynn, Massachusetts, U.S.
- Batted: Right Threw: Right

MLB debut
- May 10, 1895, for the New York Giants

Last MLB appearance
- September 25, 1896, for the New York Giants

MLB statistics
- Games played: 39
- Batting average: .265
- Runs batted in: 8
- Stats at Baseball Reference

Teams
- New York Giants (1895–1896)

Thomas Edward Bannon (May 8, 1869 – January 26, 1950), nicknamed "Ward Six" and "Uncle Tom", was an American professional baseball player and manager. He played Major League Baseball for the New York Giants in 1895 and 1896, mostly as an outfielder. Bannon was 5 feet, 8 inches tall and weighed 175 pounds.

== Career ==
Bannon was born in Amesbury, Massachusetts in 1869 and grew up in Saugus, Massachusetts. He started his professional baseball career in 1891. During the 1895 season, he played for the Eastern League's Scranton Coal Heavers and the National League's New York Giants; he had batting averages of .340 for Scranton and .270 for New York. Early in the following season, Bannon appeared in two games for the Giants, which was his last major league experience. He spent most of the summer in the Atlantic League, where he batted .387.

From 1897 to 1901, Bannon played for various teams in the Eastern League. Among his teammates in those years was his younger brother, Jimmy. In 1898, while with the Montreal Royals, Tom batted .287. The following year, he batted .274 and led the league with 64 stolen bases.

Bannon went to the Connecticut State League in 1902, played there for three seasons, and then moved on to the New England League. In 1909, he became a player-manager for the Lowell Tigers. In 1910, he was a player-manager of the Connecticut Association's Middletown Jewels, where he batted .282 in the final season of his playing career. He managed two teams in 1911.

Bannon was an umpire in the New England League for several years afterwards and then worked in the supply department for the General Electric Company. He died in Lynn, Massachusetts, in 1950 and was buried in St. Joseph Cemetery.
