= Jim McHale =

American baseball player (1875–1959)

- Outfielder
- Born: December 17, 1875; Miners Mills, Pennsylvania, U.S.
- Died: June 17, 1959 (aged 83); Los Angeles, California, U.S.
- Batted: Right Threw: Right

MLB debut
- April 14, 1908, for the Boston Red Sox

Last MLB appearance
- July 7, 1908, for the Boston Red Sox

MLB statistics
- Batting average: .224
- Home runs: 0
- Runs batted in: 7
- Stats at Baseball Reference

Teams
- Boston Red Sox (1908)

James Bernard McHale [J.B.] (December 17, 1875 – June 17, 1959) was an American reserve center fielder in Major League Baseball who played briefly for the Boston Red Sox during the 1908 season. Listed at 5 ft 11 in (1.80 m), 165 lb., McHale batted and threw right-handed. A native of Miners Mills, Pennsylvania, he attended Saint Mary's College of California.

In a 21-game career, McHale was a .224 hitter (15-for-67) with nine runs, two doubles, two triples, four stolen bases and seven RBI. He did not hit any home runs. In 19 outfield appearances, he posted a .970 fielding percentage (one error in 33 chances).

McHale died in Los Angeles, California at age 83.
