= Babe Danzig =

American baseball player (1887–1931)

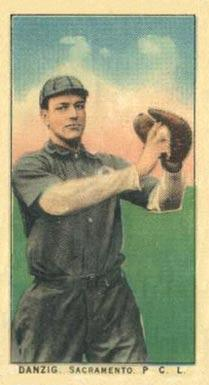
- First baseman
- Born: April 30, 1887; Binghamton, New York, U.S.
- Died: July 14, 1931 (aged 44); San Francisco, California, U.S.
- Batted: Right Threw: Right

MLB debut
- April 12, 1909, for the Boston Red Sox

Last MLB appearance
- May 4, 1909, for the Boston Red Sox

MLB statistics
- Games played: 6
- At bats: 13
- Hits: 2
- Stats at Baseball Reference

Teams
- Boston Red Sox (1909)

Harold Paul "Babe" Danzig (April 30, 1887 – July 14, 1931) was an American first baseman in Major League Baseball, playing for the Boston Red Sox in 1909. He stood at 6 ft 2 in (1.88 m) and weighed 205 lbs.

== Career ==
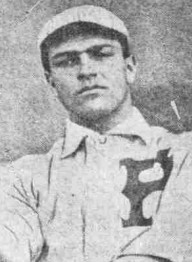
Danzig as a member of the Portland Beavers

Danzig was born in Binghamton, New York to German immigrants, and started his professional baseball career in 1906. In 1907, Danzig played for the New Bedford Whalers of the New England League. He batted .289 and led the league in slugging percentage, total bases, and triples. The following season, he moved over to the Pacific Coast League and was again one of the premiere hitters. The PCL was not strong offensively that year, and Danzig won the batting title at .298. He also topped the circuit with 39 doubles.

Danzig joined the Red Sox roster for 1909 and made his major league debut on April 12, at the age of 21. He appeared in a total of six MLB games in April and May and got 2 hits in 13 at bats, for a batting average of .154. He was then released by the Red Sox and never played in the majors again. Danzig finished out the season with the Lowell Tigers in the New England League, batting .354 in 64 games.

In 1910, Danzig returned to the Pacific Coast League. He played the next two seasons for the Sacramento Sacts, then one season in the Southern Association, and then some semi-pro baseball in Northern California. He was the first baseman and cleanup hitter for the Best Tractors as late as 1919.

Danzig died in San Francisco, California, at the age of 44.
