= Webster, Pennsylvania =

Unincorporated community in Pennsylvania, US

Coordinates: 40°11′06″N 79°50′57″W

- Census-designated place
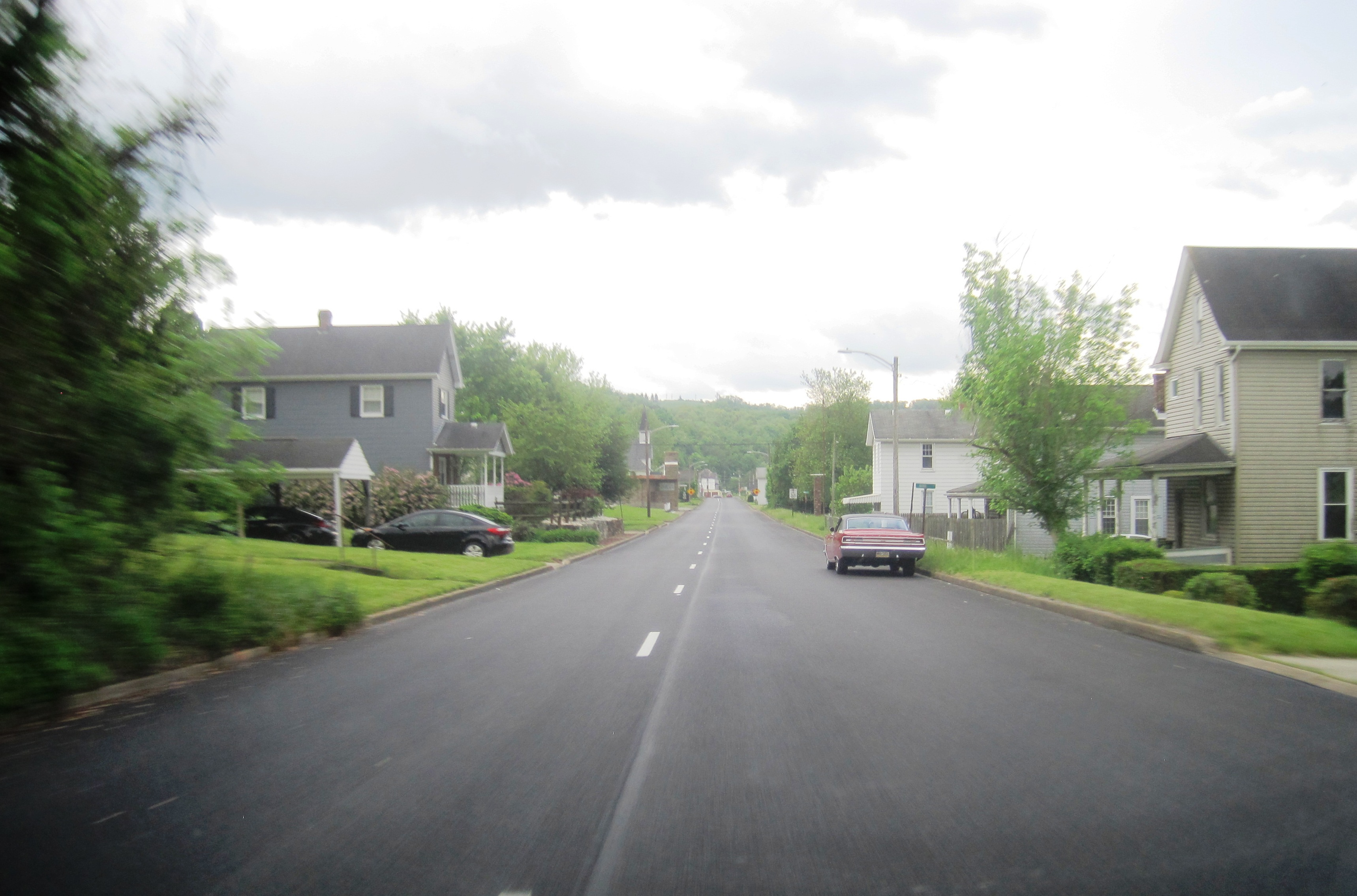
- PA 906 (1st Street) southbound in Webster
- Interactive map of Webster, Pennsylvania
- Country: United States
- State: Pennsylvania
- County: Westmoreland

Population (2010)
  - Total: 255
- Time zone: UTC-5 (Eastern (EST))
  - Summer (DST): UTC-4 (EDT)

Webster is a census-designated place located in Rostraver Township, Westmoreland County in the state of Pennsylvania, United States. The community is located along Pennsylvania Route 906. It was laid out in 1833 by Benjamin Beazell, and named for the Federalist statesman Daniel Webster. As of the 2010 census the population was 255 residents.
