= Doc McMahon =

American baseball player (1886–1929)

- Pitcher
- Born: December 19, 1886; Woburn, Massachusetts, US
- Died: December 11, 1929 (aged 42); Woburn, Massachusetts, US
- Batted: Unknown Threw: Right

MLB debut
- October 6, 1908, for the Boston Red Sox

Last MLB appearance
- October 6, 1908, for the Boston Red Sox

MLB statistics
- Pitching record: 1–0
- Earned run average: 3.00
- Strikeouts: 3
- Stats at Baseball Reference

Teams
- Boston Red Sox (1908)

Henry John McMahon (December 19, 1886 – December 11, 1929) was an American right-handed starting pitcher in Major League Baseball who played briefly for the 1908 Boston Red Sox. McMahon was born in Woburn, Massachusetts, attended the College of the Holy Cross and graduated from Tufts University School of Dental Medicine.

McMahon's only major league appearance was on October 6, 1908, in Boston's next-to-last game of the season. He started against the New York Highlanders at the Huntington Avenue Grounds and collected an 11–3, complete game victory, allowing three earned runs (3.00 ERA), 14 hits and no walks while striking out three over nine innings of work. He helped himself with the bat, hitting 2-for-5. Coincidentally, the Highlanders' starting pitcher, Andy O'Connor, was also appearing in his only major league game.

McMahon played a few years in the minor leagues. He studied dentistry at Tufts University and opened a practice in his hometown of Woburn, Massachusetts, where he died of heart trouble eight days short of his 43rd birthday.
