= William Matthews (baseball) =

American baseball player (1877–1946)

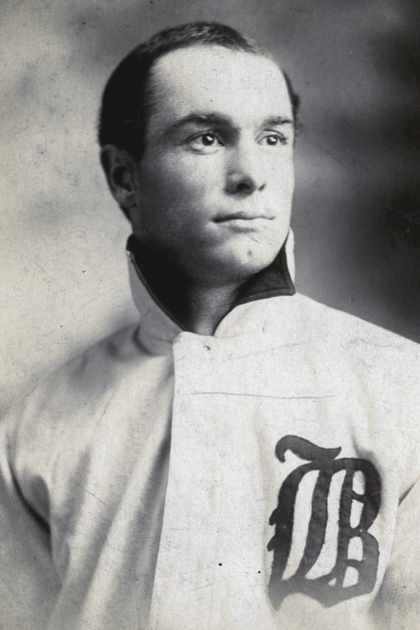
- Pitcher
- Born: January 5, 1877; Mahanoy City, Pennsylvania, U.S.
- Died: January 23, 1946 (aged 68); Mount Carbon, Pennsylvania, U.S.
- Batted: Unknown Threw: Right

MLB debut
- August 28, 1909, for the Boston Red Sox

Last MLB appearance
- September 23, 1909, for the Boston Red Sox

MLB statistics
- Win–loss record: 0-0
- Strikeouts: 6
- Earned run average: 3.24
- Stats at Baseball Reference

Teams
- Boston Red Sox (1909)

William Calvin Matthews (January 5, 1877 – January 23, 1946) was an American baseball player. He was a right-handed pitcher in Major League Baseball who played briefly for the Boston Red Sox during the 1909 season. He was born in Mahanoy City, Pennsylvania.

Matthews posted a 3.24 ERA in five appearances, including one start, six strikeout, 10 walks, 16 hits allowed, and 16.2 innings of work. He did not have a decision.

Matthews died in Mount Carbon, Pennsylvania, at age 68.
