= Chet Nourse =

American baseball player (1887–1958)

- Pitcher
- Born: August 7, 1887; Ipswich, Massachusetts, U.S.
- Died: April 20, 1958 (aged 70); Clearwater, Florida, U.S.
- Batted: Right Threw: Right

MLB debut
- July 27, 1909, for the Boston Red Sox

Last MLB appearance
- August 4, 1909, for the Boston Red Sox

MLB statistics
- Win–loss record: 0-0
- Earned run average: 7.20
- Strikeouts: 3
- Stats at Baseball Reference

Teams
- Boston Red Sox (1909)

Chester Linwood Nourse (August 7, 1887 – April 20, 1958) was an American relief pitcher in Major League Baseball who played briefly for the Boston Red Sox during the 1909 season. Listed at 6 ft 3 in (1.91 m), 180 lb., Nourse batted and threw right-handed. A native of Ipswich, Massachusetts, he attended Brown University.

In a three-game career, Nourse posted a 7.20 earned run average in 5.0 innings of work, including two games finished, three strikeouts, five walks and five hits allowed without a decision or saves.

Nourse died at the age of 70 in Clearwater, Florida.
