= Allie Strobel =

American baseball player (1884–1955)

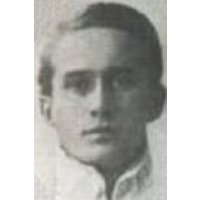
- Second baseman
- Born: June 11, 1884; Boston, Massachusetts, U.S.
- Died: February 10, 1955 (aged 70); Hollywood, Florida, U.S.
- Batted: Right Threw: Right

MLB debut
- August 29, 1905, for the Boston Beaneaters

Last MLB appearance
- August 11, 1906, for the Boston Beaneaters

MLB statistics
- Batting average: .196
- Home runs: 1
- Runs batted in: 26
- Stats at Baseball Reference

Teams
- Boston Beaneaters (1905–1906)

Albert Irving Strobel (June 11, 1884 – February 10, 1955) was an American second baseman in Major League Baseball. He played for the Boston Beaneaters.
