= Tex Pruiett =

American baseball player (1883–1953)

- Pitcher
- Born: April 10, 1883; Osgood, Indiana, U.S.
- Died: March 6, 1953 (aged 69); Ventura, California, U.S.
- Batted: Left Threw: Right

MLB debut
- April 26, 1907, for the Boston Americans

Last MLB appearance
- July 18, 1908, for the Boston Red Sox

MLB statistics
- Win–loss record: 4–18
- Earned run average: 2.83
- Strikeouts: 82
- Stats at Baseball Reference

Teams
- Boston Americans/Red Sox (1907–1908)

Charles Leroy Pruiett (April 10, 1883 – March 6, 1953) was an American pitcher in Major League Baseball who played from 1907 through 1908 for the Boston Americans and Red Sox. Listed at 5 ft 8 in (1.73 m), 176 pounds (80 kg), Pruiett batted left-handed and threw right-handed. He was born in Osgood, Indiana.

In a two-season career, Pruiett posted a 4–18 record with 54 strikeouts and a 2.83 ERA in 48 appearances, including 23 starts, seven complete games, three shutouts, five saves, and 232 1/3 innings of work.

Pruiett died in Ventura, California at age 69.
