= Jack Schulte =

American baseball player (1881-1975)

- Shortstop
- Born: November 15, 1881; Cincinnati
- Died: August 17, 1975 (aged 93); Roseville, Michigan
- Batted: Right Threw: Right

MLB debut
- August 19, 1906, for the Boston Beaneaters

Last MLB appearance
- August 19, 1906, for the Boston Beaneaters

MLB statistics
- Games played: 2
- At bats: 7
- Hits: 0
- Stats at Baseball Reference

Teams
- Boston Beaneaters (1906)

John Herman Frank Schulte (November 15, 1881 – August 17, 1975) was a shortstop in Major League Baseball. He played for the Boston Beaneaters in 1906.
