= Harry Niles =

American baseball player (1880–1953)

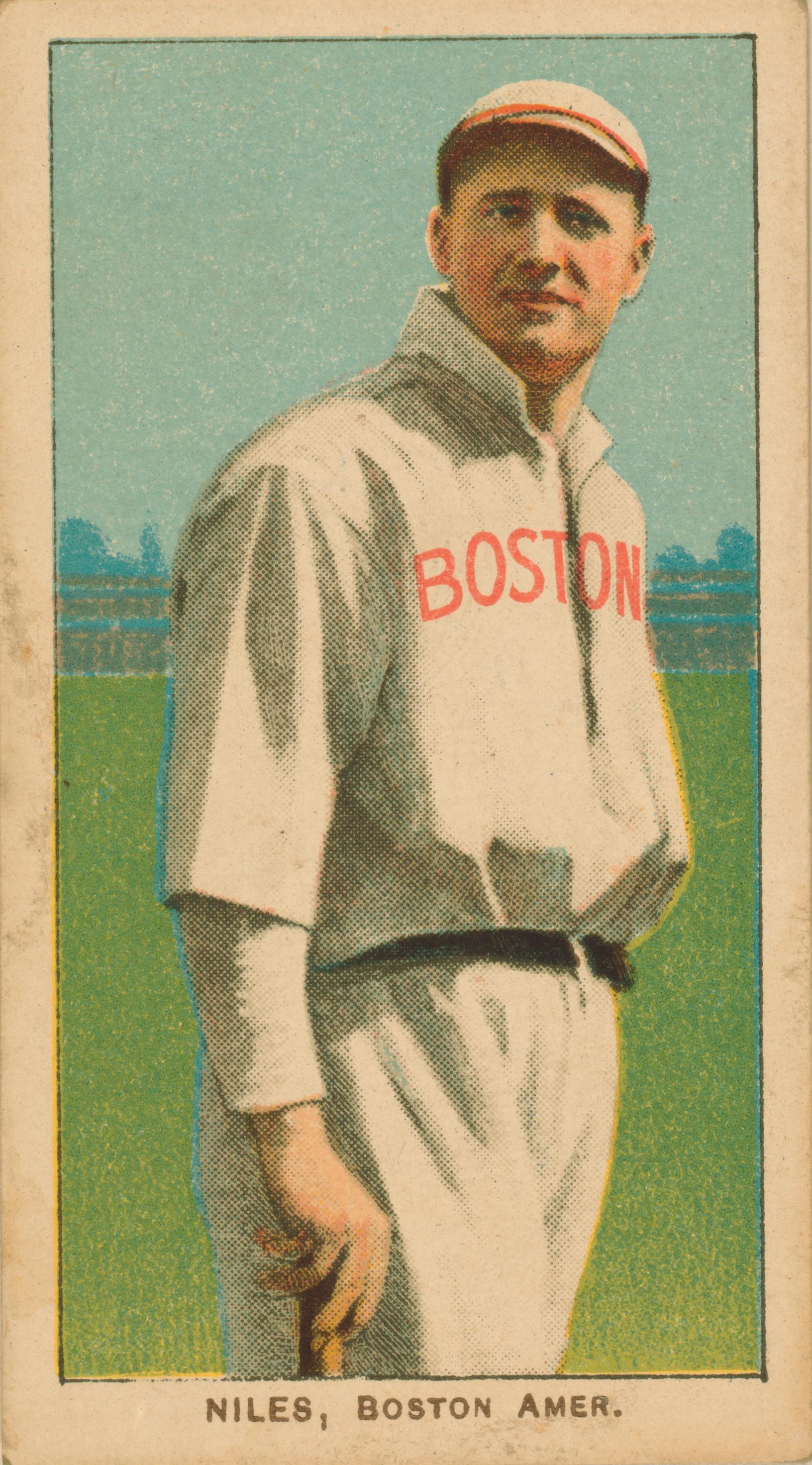
- Outfielder/Second baseman
- Born: September 10, 1880; Buchanan, Michigan, U.S.
- Died: April 18, 1953 (aged 72); Sturgis, Michigan, U.S.
- Batted: Right Threw: Right

MLB debut
- April 24, 1906, for the St. Louis Browns

Last MLB appearance
- September 28, 1910, for the Cleveland Naps

MLB statistics
- Batting average: .247
- Home runs: 12
- Runs batted in: 152
- Stats at Baseball Reference

Teams
- St. Louis Browns (1906–1907); New York Highlanders (1908); Boston Red Sox (1908–1910); Cleveland Naps (1910)

Herbert Clyde Niles (September 10, 1880 – April 18, 1953) was an American outfielder/infielder in Major League Baseball who played for four different teams between the 1906 and 1910 seasons. Listed at 5 ft 8 in (1.73 m), 175 pounds (79 kg), Niles batted and threw right-handed. He was born in Buchanan, Michigan.

== Career ==
Niles entered the majors in 1906 with the St. Louis Browns, playing for them two years before joining the New York Highlanders (1908), Boston Red Sox (1908–1910) and Cleveland Naps (1910). A valuable utility man and aggressive base runner, he scored 71 runs and stole 30 bases in his rookie season. Then, in 1907 hit career-numbers with a .289 and a .331 on-base percentage while collecting 65 runs and 19 steals, and in 1909 posted career-numbers in games (145), RBI (39) and extrabases (18).

On June 30, 1908, Nile was the only batter to reach base against Boston pitcher Cy Young. When batting leadoff for New York, Niles walked, then was caught stealing. Young retired the next 26 batters and had to settle for a no-hitter, rather than a perfect game. On August 30, 1910, New York's Tom Hughes took a no-hitter into the 10th inning before allowing a single to Niles, who was then playing for Cleveland.

In a five-season career, Niles was a .247 hitter (561-for-2270) with 12 home runs and 152 RBI in 608 games, including 278 runs, 58 doubles, 24 triples, 107 stolen bases, and a .310 on-base percentage. He made 582 appearances at second base (214), right field (184), left field (95), third base (52), center field (19) and shortstop (18).

Niles suffered a stroke on the morning of April 13, 1953 and was sent to a hospital in Sturgis, Michigan. After being in the hospital for five days, Niles died at Sturgis Hospital, age 72.
