= Jim Moroney (baseball) =

American baseball player (1883–1929)

- Pitcher
- Born: December 4, 1883; Boston, Massachusetts, U.S.
- Died: February 26, 1929 (aged 45); Philadelphia, Pennsylvania, U.S.
- Batted: Left Threw: Left

MLB debut
- April 24, 1906, for the Boston Beaneaters

Last MLB appearance
- July 23, 1912, for the Chicago Cubs

MLB statistics
- Win–loss record: 2–6
- Earned run average: 2.69
- Strikeouts: 29
- Stats at Baseball Reference

Teams
- Boston Beaneaters (1906); Philadelphia Phillies (1910); Chicago Cubs (1912)

James Francis Moroney (December 4, 1883 – February 26, 1929) was an American professional baseball player. His professional career spanned from 1904 to 1914, making 25 appearances and throwing 92.2 innings in the majors. These included stints with the Boston Beaneaters, Philadelphia Phillies and Chicago Cubs.

== Sources ==
- Career statistics from Baseball Reference · Baseball Reference (Minors) · Retrosheet · Baseball Almanac
