= Paul Howard (baseball) =

American baseball player (1884–1968)

- Outfielder
- Born: May 20, 1884; Boston, Massachusetts, U.S.
- Died: August 29, 1968 (aged 84); Miami, Florida, U.S.
- Batted: Right Threw: Right

MLB debut
- September 16, 1909, for the Boston Red Sox

Last MLB appearance
- September 29, 1909, for the Boston Red Sox

MLB statistics
- Batting average: .200
- Home runs: 0
- Runs batted in: 2
- Stats at Baseball Reference

Teams
- Boston Red Sox (1909)

Paul Joseph Howard, nicknamed "Del", (May 20, 1884 – August 29, 1968) was an American outfielder in Major League Baseball who played briefly for the Boston Red Sox during the 1909 season. Listed at 5 ft 8 in (1.73 m), 170 lb., Howard batted and threw right-handed. He was born in Boston, Massachusetts.

Howard was a .200 hitter (3-for-15) with one double, two runs and two RBI in six games. In six outfield appearances, he played at left field (4) and right (2), while posting a 1.000 fielding percentage in three chances.

Howard died in Miami, Florida at age 84, and is buried in Winthrop, Massachusetts
