= Charlie French =

American baseball player (1883–1962)

- Second baseman
- Born: October 12, 1883; Indianapolis, Indiana, U.S.
- Died: March 30, 1962 (aged 78); Indianapolis, Indiana, U.S.
- Batted: Left Threw: Right

MLB debut
- May 23, 1909, for the Boston Red Sox

Last MLB appearance
- September 13, 1910, for the Chicago White Sox

MLB statistics
- Batting average: .207
- At bat: 377
- RBI: 20
- Stats at Baseball Reference

Teams
- Boston Red Sox (1909–1910); Chicago White Sox (1910)

Charles Calvin French (October 12, 1883 – March 30, 1962) was an American professional baseball player who began his major league career at the age of 25 with the Boston Red Sox. He played in 105 games with 377 at bats. He had 78 hits and 20 RBIs with no home runs.

== Transaction ==
May 19, 1910: Purchased by the Chicago White Sox from the Boston Red Sox.
