= Jack Cameron (baseball) =

Canadian baseball player (1884-1963)

- Outfielder
- Born: September 22, 1884; Sydney, Nova Scotia, Canada
- Died: July 12, 1963 (aged 78); Charlotte, North Carolina, U.S.
- Batted: Right

MLB debut
- September 13, 1906, for the Boston Beaneaters

Last MLB appearance
- October 5, 1906, for the Boston Beaneaters

MLB statistics
- Batting average: .180
- Home runs: 0
- Runs batted in: 4
- Stats at Baseball Reference

Teams
- Boston Beaneaters (1906)

John Stanley "Happy Jack" Cameron (born September 22, 1884 – July 12, 1963) was a Canadian Major League Baseball outfielder. He batted .180 with 4 RBIs in 18 games for the Boston Beaneaters in 1906.
