= Pat Donahue =

American baseball player (1884–1966)

- Catcher
- Born: November 3, 1884; Springfield, Ohio, US
- Died: January 31, 1966 (aged 81); Springfield, Ohio, US
- Batted: Right Threw: Right

MLB debut
- May 29, 1908, for the Boston Red Sox

Last MLB appearance
- September 5, 1910, for the Philadelphia Athletics

MLB statistics
- Batting average: .211
- Home runs: 3
- Runs batted in: 35
- Stats at Baseball Reference

Teams
- Boston Red Sox (1908–1910); Philadelphia Athletics (1910); Cleveland Naps (1910)

Patrick William Donahue (November 3, 1884 – January 31, 1966) was an American professional baseball player who was a catcher in Major League Baseball (MLB) for the Boston Red Sox, Philadelphia Athletics and the Cleveland Naps.

Donahue started playing professional baseball in 1902 in Minor League Baseball when he was only 17. He played as a catcher and first baseman. In the three years he played major-league baseball, he hit three home runs in a total of 119 games. His brother, also a major-league baseball player, was Jiggs Donahue.

== Trades ==
- June 10, 1910: Purchased by the Athletics from the Red Sox.
- Traded from the Athletics to the Naps and back to the Athletics in 1910.
