= Brockton Shoemakers =

- 1892–1933; (1885–1886, 1892–1899, 1901, 1903, 1907–1915, 1928–1929, 1933); Brockton, Massachusetts

Minor league affiliations
- Class: Independent (1885–1886, 1901); Class B (1892–1899); Independent (1901); Class A (1901); Class B (1903, 1907–1913); Class C (1914–1915); Class B (1928–1929, 1933)
- League: Eastern New England League (1885); New England League (1886, 1892–1899); Eastern League (1901); New England League (1901, 1903, 1905–1913); Colonial League (1914–1915); New England League (1928–1929, 1933)

Major league affiliations
- Team: Detroit Tigers (1933)

Minor league titles
- League titles (2): 1897; 1898
- Wild card berths (0): None

Team data
- Name: Brockton (1885–1886); Brockton Shoemakers (1892-1899); Brockton B's (1901); Brockton Bees (1903); Brockton Tigers (1907–1909); Brockton Shoemakers(1910-1915, 1928-1929, 1933)
- Ballpark: Highland Park (1892–1893); Centre Street Grounds (1894–1895); Highland Park (1896-1899, 1901, 1903); Centre Street Grounds (1907-1915); Highland Park (1928–1929); Centre Park Grounds (1933)

The Brockton Shoemakers were an early minor league baseball team based in Brockton, Massachusetts. The "Shoemakers" had a long tenure as members of the New England League beginning in 1892 and continuing through the 1933 season, after the first "Brockton" team began play in 1885. The Shoemakers won New England League championships in 1887 and 1888.

The Brockton "Shoemakers" nickname corresponds with Brockton's large shoemaking industry in the era, when a peak of 13,000 employees worked at shoe factories in the city.

From 1907 to 1909, the Brockton team was known as the "Tigers" in their first three seasons of play following the 1905 Grover Shoe Factory disaster in Brockton.

Brockton teams played home minor league games at both Highland Park and the Centre Street Grounds. The Brockton franchise utilized both ballparks intermittently from 1885 through 1933.

Brockton played a partial minor league season in the 1933 New England League and were a minor league affiliate of the Detroit Tigers that season.

Brockton next hosted minor league baseball with the 2002 Brockton Rox, after nearly a seventy-season gap between minor league teams.

== History ==
=== 1885–1886: Early minor-league teams ===
Minor league baseball began in Brockton in 1885, when the "Brockton" team became charter members of the Eastern New England League. The Biddeford Clamdiggers, Haverhill, Lawrence, Newburyport Clamdiggers and Portland teams joined with Brockton in beginning league play.

Brockton's Eastern New England League team player/manager was Bill McGunnigle, a Brockton native. A decade earlier McGunnigle was credited with using the first catchers mit, while playing with a Fall River team in 1875. After his hands became sore after playing catcher, McGunnigle used bricklayers' gloves with the glove fingers removed to fashion the first catchers mit. In 2015, a plaque of Bill McGunnigle was dedicated at the Brockton City Hall after having been first unveiled in a temporary location at a Brockton Rox game in 2014.

Officially, the Lawrence team ended the 1885 season in first place with a 50–31 record, finishing 2.0 games ahead of second place Brockton, who had a final record of 48–33. There was controversy that led to a final playoff series between the top two teams. In 1885, Lawrence was managed by Walter Burnham, who later had a championship tenure as the Brockton manager.

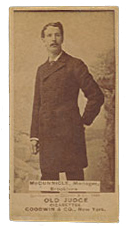
(1887) Bill McGunnigle. A Brockton native, McGunnigle managed the first Brockton teams before becoming a major league manager. McGunnigle is credited with inventing the catchers mit.

The Brockton and Lawrence teams were both in competition for the 1885 Eastern New England League championship throughout the season. As the season was nearing its end, two games between the two teams were disputed and the league ruled in a September meeting that they were to be made up at the end of the scheduled regular season. The games were scheduled by the league to be played on October 3 in Lawrence and October 4 in Brockton. However, the Brockton team did not appear for the first game in Lawrence. With fans in the stands, the game at Lawrence was declared a 9-0 forfeit by the umpire after Brockton did not appear. McGunnigle said in the aftermath that he wasn't able to reassemble his complete team in time for the game and Lawrence countered the Brockton should be expelled from the league. After a league meeting was held on October 6, 1895, the two teams were in agreement to play a three-game series for the championship. The games were rescheduled to be played on October 10 in Brockton, October 13 in Lawrence, and October 15 in Boston, if necessary. Lawrence was victorious in the playoff, winning the first game 9–4 and the second game 11–4 and won the league championship. Kent Howard of Brockton won the league batting title, hitting .357. Teammate William Hawes scored a league leading 87 runs.

Brockton continued minor league play in 1886. On July 23, 1886, Brockton player/manager Bill McGunnigle suffered a fractured skull when hit in the head by a pitch in a game against Lawrence. The incident ended McGunnigle's career as a regular player. Lawrence pitcher Dick Conway threw two pitches at his head that McGunnigle was able to avoid, before Conway hit McGunnigle in the head with the third pitch, according to the Brockton Weekly Gazette. The Boston Globe, said of the beaning. "The only topic on the street tonight is the question of whether it was Conway's idea to frighten the batsman or if he was trying to get the balls as close to the batsman as possible"

The Eastern New England League continued play and shortened its name for the 1886 season. The newly named "New England League" played its first game in 1886, with the same five Eastern New England League clubs plus the addition of the Boston Blues as the sixth team. Brockton resumed minor league play during the 1886 New England League season. Brockton had a final record of 45-56 and ended the season in fourth place in the six-team league. Brockton was managed by Bill McGunnigle and Jim Cudworth, as the team finished 29.5 games behind the first place Portland team.

The Brockton team did not return to play as members of the 1887 New England League. The league expanded from six teams to eight teams, adding the Lowell Browns, Manchester Farmers and Salem Witches franchises as the new members. Bill McGunnigle managed Lowell, who won the league championship. After managing Lowell, Bill McGunnigle became manager of the Brooklyn Bridegrooms, signed by Brooklyn for a salary of $2,500. McGunnigle led Brooklyn to the 1889 and 1890 National League pennants. McGunnigle was best friends with former teammate Jim Cudworth who replaced him as Lowell's manager in 1888 after having also replaced him as the Brockton manager in 1886.

=== 1892–1899: Brockton Shoemakers, New England League ===
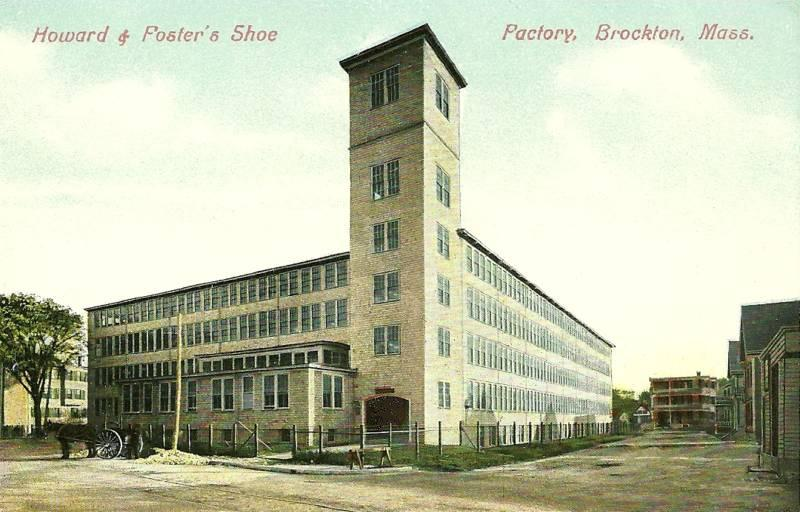
(1910) Postcard. Howard & Foster's Shoe Factory, Brockton, Massachusetts.

The Brockton "Shoemakers" nickname for their baseball team corresponds with local history and industry in the era. Circa 1900, over 6,000 people were employed in over 100 separate shoe manufacturing entities within the city. Brockton was nicknamed as the "Shoe City." In 1919, there were 39 shoe manufacturers in the Brockton with 13,000 employees. By 1964, Brockton had 10 shoe factories, with 2,000 employees. The last shoe manufacturer in the city closed in 2009. Today's Footjoy shoe brand was founded in Brockton as the Burt and Packard Shoe Company in 1857. It was soon named the Field and Flint Company, and established the Footjoy brand in 1923.

Famed boxer Rocky Marciano grew up in Brockton, playing baseball at Brockton High School and dreaming of a baseball career. Marciano's father was employed at the Adams Shoe Company. His father forbid Rocky from working at the shoe factories and encouraged him to follow other pursuits, which led him to baseball and then boxing.

With Bill McGunnigle returning as manager from his time with the Brooklyn Bridegrooms, Brockton resumed minor league play in 1892. The Brockton franchise rejoined the Class B level New England League, with the team becoming known as the "Shoemakers" for the first time. The Shoemakers finished the 1892 season with a 46–45 record to place fourth in the eight–team New England League, which lost three teams during the season. The Shoemakers finished 15.5 games behind first place Woonsocket team in the final standings, as the New England League ended the season with five remaining teams.

In 1893, the Brockton Shoemakers continued play as the New England League played the season with six teams and retained a Class B level status. Brockton ended the season with a 30–51 record in New England League play, as Fred Doe replaced Bill McGunnigle as manager for the season. Bill McGunnigle left Brockton and became owner/manager of the rival Lowell franchise in the New England League. The Shoemakers finished the 1893 season in fifth place, ending the season 25.5 games behind the first place Fall River Indians in the final standings.

In 1894, Brockton native Frank Sexton was a local player who had signed to play with the team. However, Sexton was in dispute with the Shoemakers over the language in his signed contract for the upcoming season. On April 17, 1984, Sexton did report to the team at the beginning of the season for Brockton despite being under contract. Sexton and Brockton manager W.H. Allen were in a dispute over Sexton having no intention of pitching for Brockton after May 16, 1894. Sexton showed the media a contract with signatures of both he and Allen with clear wording that Sexton was to pitch for Brockton from April 16 to May 16, 1894. After his Brockton stint, Sexton eventually signed with the Boston Beaneaters on June 18, 1894.

The Brockton Shoemakers folded before the end of the eight–team 1894 New England League season, after compiling a poor record. On August 25, 1894, having played under managers William Allen and Charles Wilson, the Shoemakers folded with a record of 30–62 on that date. The Fall River Indians were the eventual league champions.

Despite folding the previous season, Brockton continued membership in the 1895 Class B level New England League and began the season with the rest of the eight–team league. The Brockton Shoemakers finished in sixth place in the eight–team league. With a final record of 48–56, the Shoemakers ended the season 18.0 games behind the first place Fall River Indians in the final standings. Royal Perrin managed Brockton during the 1895 season.

With Walt Burnham beginning a tenure as manager, the 1896 Brockton Shoemakers improved to finish in third place in the New England League season. Brockton ended the season with a 63–43 record, playing its first season under manager Walter Burnham. The league championship was won again by the Fall River Indians, who finished 4.5 games ahead of third place Brockton in the final standings, as the league held no playoffs. Ed Breckinridge of Brockton led the New England League with 25 home runs, while also hitting .402 on the season. Brockton pitcher Jim Korwan led the league with 168 strikeouts and advanced to pitch for the Chicago Cubs in 1897. At age 25, Korwin died of tuberculosis in 1899.

In 1897, the Brockton Shoemakers were the co-champions of the six–team Class B level New England League, after ending the regular season in a tie. The Fall River Indians, New Bedford Whalers, Newport Colts, Pawtucket Phenoms and Taunton Herrings teams joined Brockton in 1897 New England League play.

A native of New Brunswick, Canada, Bill Magee was a 20-year-old pitcher when he played his first professional season with Brockton in 1897. Magee pitched to a 17–14 record with a 2.05 ERA, throwing 28 complete games and 279 innings for the Shoemakers. Magee advanced and pitched for six teams in five seasons in the major leagues. Magee had career a 29–51 record before he suddenly disappeared following his 1906 season. In 1907, with a wife and children, Magee reportedly vanished from Buffalo, New York and left his family, never to be seen or heard from again.

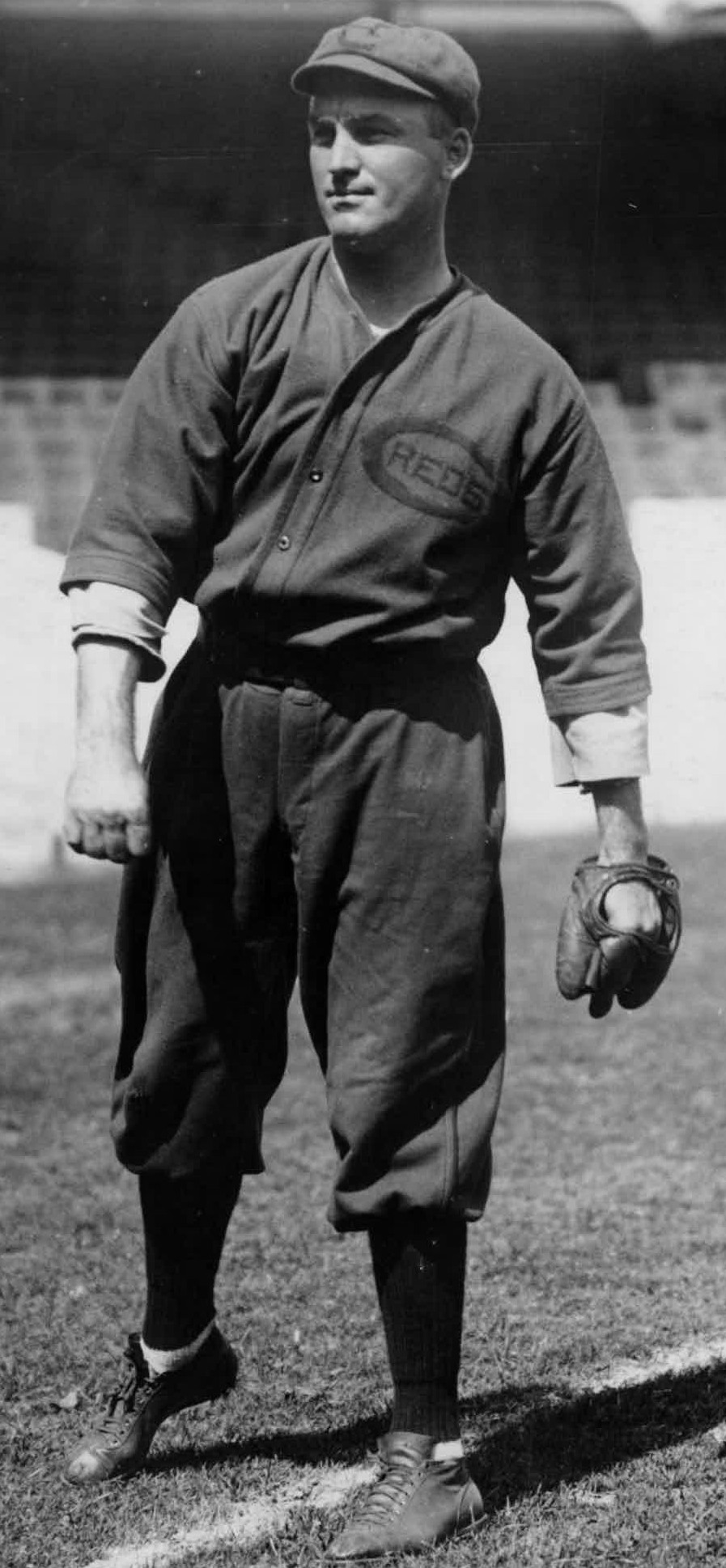
(1913) Jimmy Sheckard, Cincinnati Reds. Sheckard played for Brockton in 1897. In 1903 he led the National League in home runs and stolen bases in the same season. He retired with 2,084 hits and 465 stolen bases.

Jimmy Sheckard played for the Brockton Shoemakers in 1897 before making his major league debut with the Brooklyn Bridegrooms at the end of the season, embarking on a 17-year career. At age 18, Sheckard led the New England League in batting average, runs scored, stolen bases and total hits. Sheckard also pitched in 11 games for Brockton and had a 0.95 ERA. Playing with the Chicago Cubs in 1911, Sheckard set the single season major league record for walks with 147. The record was broken by Babe Ruth in 1920. Sheckard is one of four players in the modern era (1900–present) to hold the single season walks record; the others are Ruth, Jack Crooks, and Barry Bonds. Sheckard is the all-time major leader among left fielders in assists, with 243.

After beginning league play on May 1, 1897, Brockton tied for the New England League championship. The Shoemakers ended the season with a 70–37 record, playing under returning manager Walt Burnham. Brockton finished in a first-place tie, as the Newport Colts ended the New England League season the identical record. No playoff was held between the two teams. Brockton and Newport were followed in the New England League standings by the Pawtucket Phenoms (54–51), Fall River Indians (47–59), Taunton Herrings (40–68) and New Bedford Whalers (38–67). Jimmy Sheckard of Brockton led the league in multiple categories. Sheckard won the league batting championship, while hitting .370. His 53 stolen bases, 122 runs scored and 166 total hits, also led the league. Brockton pitcher Togie Pittinger led the New England League pitchers with a 14–5 record.

On June 22, 1898, Fall River Indians pitcher Tom Flanagan threw a no–hitter and defeated the Brockton Shoemakers 5–0.

Continuing play in the 1898 six–team Class B level New England League, the Brockton Shoemakers won their second consecutive New England League championship in a shortened season. The New England League stopped play on July 5, 1898. The Shoemakers ended the season with a record of 32–16 and were in first place under returning manager Walter Burnham when the New England League folded in July. Brockton finished 6.5 games ahead of the place Pawtucket Tigers in the final standings. Brockton pitcher Grant Thatcher led the New England League with a 10–2 record.

Brockton continued play as the New England League resumed play in 1899 after folding during the previous season. The league expanded from six teams to eight teams to begin the 1899 season, but four of the teams folded during the season, first place Brockton included. On August 8, 1899, with a 45–27 record, Brockton folded while leading the league standings. Playing under returning manager Walter Burnham, Brockton folded on the same day as the Pawtucket Tigers. The eventual first place Portland Phenoms were the league champion in 1899. Ed Breckenbridge of Brockton hit 12 home runs to lead the New England League. The New England League did not return to play in the 1900 season.

=== 1901, 1903, 1907–1910: New England League ===
In an oddity, after not fielding a team in 1900, Brockton had two separate teams play in two separate leagues in the 1901 season. This happened after Brockton began the 1901 season without a minor league team. The first 1901 Brockton team evolved from the Bangor Millionaires, who began the season as members of the independent level New England League before relocating to Brockton during the season. The Augusta Live Oaks, Bangor Millionaires, Haverhill Hustlers, Lewiston, Lowell Tigers, Manchester, Nashua and Portland teams began league play on May 15, 1901, without Brockton joining them as a member to begin the season.

On June 30, 1901, Bangor had compiled a record of 22–14 while playing under manager Walter Burnham, Brockton's former manager, when the franchise was relocated to Brockton, Massachusetts. The team's tenure in Brockton was brief. One week later on July 6, 1901, the Brockton franchise folded from the New England League. Overall, the Bangor/Brockton team had a 24–16 final record when it was disbanded. After the folding of the Bangor/Brockton team before the conclusion of the season, pitcher Frank Willis joined the Lowell Tigers and led the New England League with both 18 wins and 160 strikeouts in pitching for teams in the three cities.

Following its folding from the New England League, the Brockton franchise immediately gained a team in another league. Brockton joined the reformed 1901 Class A level Eastern League nineteen days after their New England League team had folded. In the era, Class A was the highest level of minor leagues.

On July 25, 1901, the Syracuse Stars team of the Eastern League team relocated to Brockton, with the team becoming known as the Brockton "B's." On that date, Syracuse had a 28–39 record while playing under manager Frank Leonard when the franchise relocated to become the Brockton B's. After compiling a 17–48 record while based in Brockton, the Syracuse/Brockton team ended the season in seventh place with a 45–87 overall record. The team finished 44.0 games behind the first place Rochester Bronchos in the eight-team league. Brockton did not return to the Eastern League in 1902, with the Jersey City Skeeters replacing the Brockton franchise in league membership.

After not fielding a minor league team in 1902, Brockton returned as members of the 1903 New England League to begin the season. On June 27, 1903, the Brockton "Bees" team had compiled an 18–23 record when the franchise relocated to become the New Bedford Whalers. The Brockton/New Hartford team ended the season with an overall record of 46–63, playing the season under manager Fred Doe, who returned to manage Brockton after a ten-year period between tenures. Brockton/New Hartford ended the season finished 24.0 games behind the first place Lowell Tigers in the final standings of the eight-team Class B level league, as no playoffs were held. The New Bedford franchise continued play as members of the New England League in the 1904, 1905 and 1906 seasons. Brockton did not field a minor league team during those seasons.

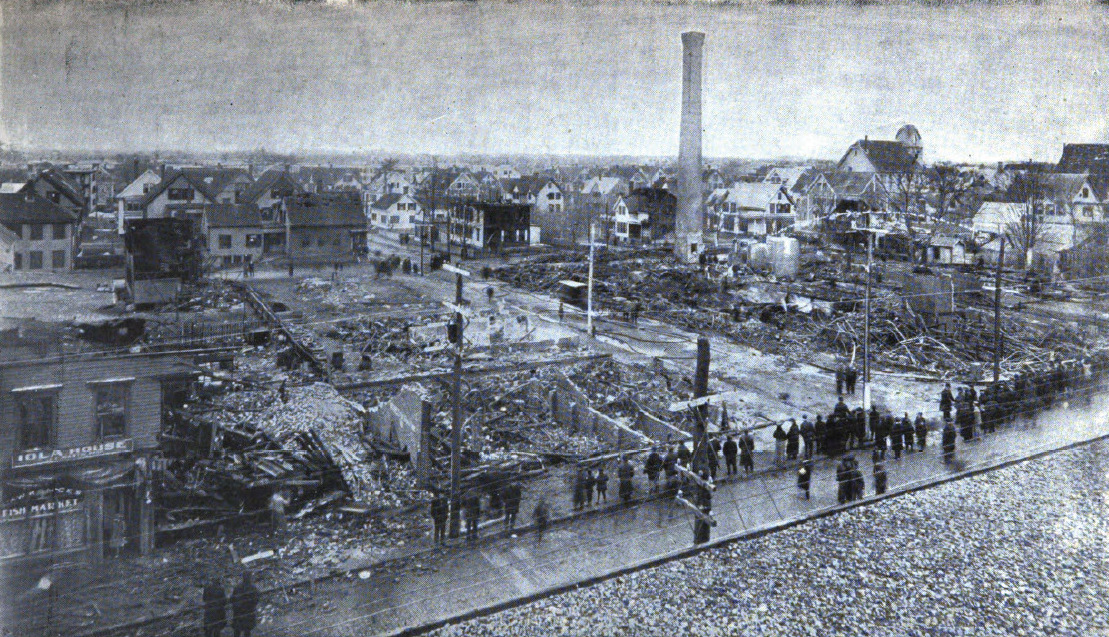
(1905) Grover Shoe factory site after the explosion. Brockton, Massachusetts.

On March 20, 1905, a boiler explosion at a shoe factory in Brockton killed 58 workers and injured hundreds of workers and nearby residents. The event became known as the Grover Shoe Factory disaster. After the explosion, engineers estimated the force of the boiler explosion as equal to 660 pounds (300 kg) of dynamite.

When the baseball team resumed minor league play, Brockton was known by the "Tigers" nickname for the 1907 to 1909 seasons. The 1907 Brockton Tigers returned as members of the New England League, as the league played as a Class B level league with eight teams. Brockton replaced the Manchester Textiles team in the league and the Manchester manager, Stephen Flanagan, became the Brockton manager in 1907, beginning a five-season tenure with the team. Beginning in 1905, the Lynn franchise had also become known as the "Shoemakers' during Brockton's absence from the league. The Brockton Tigers joined the Fall River Indians, Haverhill Hustlers, Lawrence Colts, Lowell Tigers, Lynn Shoemakers, New Bedford Whalers and Worcester Busters teams in beginning league play on April 26, 1907. The Tigers had competition in the league with Hall of Fame member Jesse Burkett serving as player/manager for the Worcester Busters team, who would have multiple championship seasons.

During the 1907 season, the Brockton Tigers added Brockton native Buck O'Brien to their roster. In July, O'Brien signed his first professional contract. Buck O'Brien's professional debut came on August 20, 1907, against the Haverhill team. O'Brien gave up six runs in four innings, before he was removed by manager Stephen Flanagan, but the Tigers rallied to win the game by the score of 9–7. In two subsequent appearances for Brockton, O'Brien improved his performances. After establishing himself in the major leagues, on April 20, 1912, O'Brien was the starting pitcher for Boston Red Sox in the first game ever played at the newly constructed Fenway Park.

In their return to the New England League, the 1907 Brockton Tigers ended the season in third place in the eight-team league behind manager Stephen Flanagan. The Tigers ended the 1907 season with a 59–51 record, ending the season 16.0 games behind the first place Worcester Busters, managed by Jesse Burkett in the Class B level league. Brockton player Simmy Murch tied for the New England League lead in home runs, with 4 total home runs on the season.

The 1908 Brockton Tigers were again managed by Stephen Flanagan as the team finished in fourth place in the eight-team New England League final standings. The Tigers had a 66–56 final record, finishing the season 13.0 games behind the New England League champion Worcester Busters and manager Jesse Burkett in the final standings of the Class B level league, which held no playoffs. Tom Catterson of Brockton won the 1908 New England League, batting title, hitting .327. Catterson also led the league with 140 total hits. Tigers pitcher Marty O'Toole won 31 games to lead the league, along with 266 strikeouts, best in the New England League. The next league player finishing behind O'Toole in wins was Frank Barberich of Worcester, who had 24 wins. After the New England League season ended, O'Toole was signed by the Cincinnati Reds and joined the Reds for the end of the 1908 season. He appeared in three games for Cincinnati, with a 1–0 record and a 2.40 ERA.

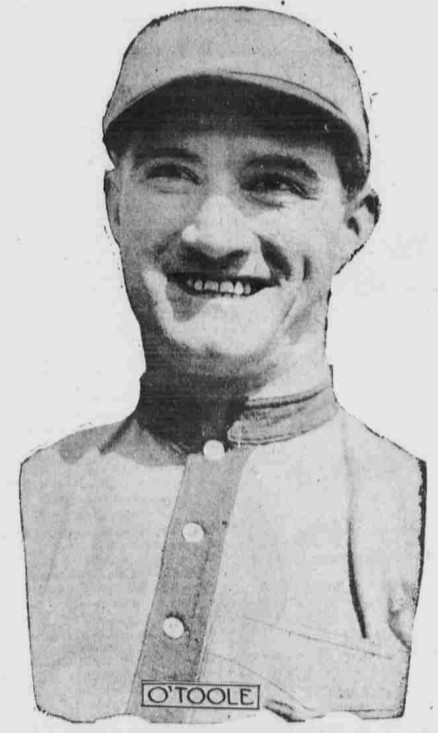
(1912) Marty O'Toole. O'Toole won 31 games for Brockton in 1908. In three seasons as a pitcher for the Brockton Tigers, O'Toole won 76 total games. In 1912, he led the National League with 6 shutouts.

At the conclusion of the 1909 season, the Brockton Tigers finished as the runner-up in the eight–team Class B level New England League. Managed during the season by the returning Stephen Flanagan, the Tigers ended the season with a record of 75–48. In a close race, Brockton finished 1.5 games behind the first place Worcester Busters and manager Jesse Burkett in the final New England League standings. Olaf Henriksen of Brockton scored 88 runs to lead the New England League and teammate Simmy Murch had a league best 144 total hits. Tigers' pitcher Marty O'Toole returned to Brockton and again led the New England League in wins, with 26, along with 265 strikeouts, the most in the New England League. In three seasons pitching for Brockton, O'Toole won 76 games.

In 1910 Marty McHale began a storied baseball season. While pitching for the Maine Black Bears baseball team in 1910, McHale threw three consecutive no-hitters during the college baseball season. Upon graduating from Maine, McHale signed with the Boston Red Sox organization in May 1910, and received a $2,000 signing bonus from Boston. McHale was sent to the minor leagues and promptly made his professional debut with the 1910 Brockton Shoemakers. After his stint with Brockton, McHale then made his major league debut with Boston on September 28, 1910. After his baseball career ended, McHale performed professionally in vaudeville, singing as a tenor. Variety Magazine referred to McHale as "baseball's Enrico Caruso" and Babe Ruth stated that McHale was "the best goddamn singer I ever heard."

Continuing as New England League members in 1910, the Brockton franchise returned being known by their former nickname. The renamed Brockton "Shoemakers" continued Brockton's tenure in New England League play and finished the season in last place in the eight-team league. The last place finish was a fall from their second-place finish in the New England League standings the previous season. Stephen Flanagan continued his tenure as Brockton's manager, as the Shoemakers ended the season with a final record of 45–62. Brockton ended the 1910 season 29.0 games behind the first place New Bedford Whalers in the final standings of the Class B level league.

=== 1911–1913: New England League ===
Continuing the Brockton membership in the Class B level New England League, the 1911 Shoemakers team placed sixth in the final league standings. Playing the season under returning manager Stephen Flanagan, Brockton ended the season with a record of 59–60 in the eight-team league. The Shoemakers finished 16.0 games behind the first place Lowell Tigers, as the league held no playoffs.

Chippy Gaw played for the Brockton Shoemakers teams in both 1911 and 1912. While playing baseball, Gaw received his degree in dentistry from Tufts University. Following his baseball career, he later became a collegiate ice hockey coach. In his hockey coaching career, Gaw coached the Dartmouth College, Princeton University Tigers and Boston University Terriers collegiate hockey teams.

The 1912 Brockton Shoemakers ended the Class B level New England League season in fifth place, playing the season under manager Ed McLane. The Shoemakers ended the season with a 62–62 record and finished 14.5 games behind the first place Lawrence Barristers in the league standings, as the eight-team league held no postseason playoffs.

The Brockton team continued to be known as the "Shoemakers," playing in the 1913 eight-team New England League and finishing the season in last place. Nick Rufiange was the Brockton manager as no playoffs were held. The Shoemakers ended the season with a 44–75 record and finished 33.5 games behind the first place Lowell Grays in the final standings. The second place Portland Duffs team was managed by Baseball Hall of Fame member Hugh Duffy in 1913. The third place Worcester Busters, were managed again by Baseball Hall of Fame member Jesse Burkett. Following the 1913, season, the Brockton franchise left the New England League and joined a new league. The Brockton franchise was replaced by the Fitchburg Burghers in the 1914 New England League.

=== 1914–1915: Colonial League ===
In 1914, the Brockton Shoemakers left the New England League and became charter members of the newly formed Colonial League, a league that became mired in controversy. The Colonial League was formed for the 1914 season as a six–team Class C level minor league. The Fall River Spindles, New Bedford Whalers, Pawtucket Tigers, Taunton Herrings and Woonsocket Speeders teams joined Brockton in the newly formed league.

During their first 1914 season, it was speculated that the Colonial League was being controlled by the major league rival Federal League, a claim which was denied by the league, but later proved to be accurate. In April, 1914 Pawtucket team owner Alexander Bannwart drew attention in hiring Big Jeff Pfeffer to manage his Pawtucket Tigers. In May, it was suspected that Bannwart was working as an "agent" of the Federal League, which Bannwart denied.

The 1914 Brockton Shoemakers ended their first Colonial League season in last place in the final standings of the newly formed league, which held no playoffs. With a record of 36–61 the Shoemakers placed sixth in the six-team league. Playing the season under managers Willie Reardon and Bert Weeden, Brockton finished 25.0 games behind the first place Fall River Spindles in the final standings.

The 1915 Colonial League reorganized itself, officially becoming a farm system for the major league rival Federal League. As a result, the league voluntarily withdrew itself from the National Association. At the April 1915 Colonial League meeting, Charles Coppen was re-elected as president and Alexander Bannwart was elected as league secretary. Walter S. Ward, the treasurer of the Brooklyn Tip-Tops and the son of Brooklyn team owner George S. Ward, was elected as the Colonial League's treasurer.

Wishing to expand the Colonial League into Springfield, Massachusetts, Hartford, Connecticut and New Haven, Connecticut, whose regions belonged to the Eastern Association, the Colonial League reorganized itself as the farm system for the Federal League. and voluntarily withdrew itself from the organization of the National Association. Continuing play in the eight-team 1915 Colonial League, Brockton joined the Fall River Spindles, Hartford Senators, New Bedford Whalers, New Haven White Wings, Pawtucket Rovers, Springfield Tips and Taunton Herrings teams in Colonial League play.

After their last place finish the previous season, Brockton continued play in the 1915 Colonial League and ended the season in a very close second place. The Brockton team was also referred to as the "Pilgrims" in 1916. Brockton finished the season with a 57–44 record as the team finished just .003 percentage points behind the first place Hartford Senators, who had a 55–42. No playoff was held as the two teams had the nearly identical winning percentages. Bert Weeden returned as the Brockton manager.

The Colonial League folded following the 1915 season, as did the Federal League. With legal disputes and financial challenges mounting, the Federal League was forced to fold following the 1915 season, leaving the Colonial League unable to continue following the 1915 league season. The Colonial League financial struggles were directed at Alexander Bannwart and the league policies he implemented. The salary maximums set by Bannwart and approved by the league were cited for the poor quality of play and diminishing fan interest in the league. In August 1915, Bannwart had resigned from the Colonial League before the conclusion of the season.

=== 1928–1929, 1933: Final New England League seasons ===
Following the demise of the Federal League in 1915, Brockton did not host another a minor league team until the 1928 season. Following their departure from the league in 1913, the 1928 Brockton Shoemakers franchise reformed and returned to membership in the Class B level New England League. Brockton replaced the Lawrence Merry Macks franchise in the league. The Attleboro Burros, Haverhill Hillies, Lewiston-Auburn Twins, Lynn Papooses, Manchester Blue Sox, Portland Mariners and Salem Witches teams joined Brockton in beginning New England League play on May 16, 1928.

Future major league player, coach and scout Jack Burns played for Brockton in 1928. After a major league playing and coaching career, Burns became a minor league manager and spent five seasons (1955–1959) as a Boston Red Sox coach under manager Pinky Higgins. Burns then became a scout for Boston, serving in that capacity beginning in 1960 until his death. Burns is credited with scouting, recommending and signing Baseball Hall of Fame member Carlton Fisk, who became Boston's first-round selection in the January portion of the 1967 Major League Baseball draft.

In their return to New England League play, Brockton placed fourth in the overall New England League standings in 1928. With a record of 51–48, the Shoemakers were managed by Lew Courtney and finished 4.5 games behind the first place Lynn Papooses in the overall league standings. The league played a split season schedule. The Attleboro Burrows won the first-half pennant of the split-season schedule Lynn won the second half. In the final, Lynn defeated the Attleboro four games to three. Henry Bosse of Brockton hit 12 home runs on the season to lead the New England League.

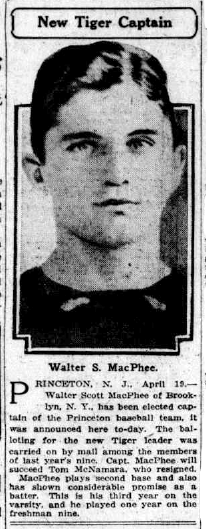
(1922) Waddy MacPhee. McPhee played in both the National Football League and major league baseball. He played for the Brockton Shoemakers in 1929.

Waddy MacPhee was added to the roster and played for Brockton in 1929. MacPhee was an early two sport professional baseball athlete. MacPhee played for Major League Baseball's New York Giants in 1922, and the NFL's Providence Steam Rollers in 1926.

Brockton played their final New England League full season in 1929, as the Shoemakers ended the season in sixth place. Playing under a new manager, Brockton continued play as members the eight-team Class B level New England League. The Shoemakers placed sixth in 1929 New England League standings, finishing 24.5 games behind the first place Lynn Red Sox. With a record of 55–69, Brockton played the season under manager Art Ryan. No playoffs were held following the regular season. Brockton folded following the 1929 season along with the Haverhill franchise, and did not play in the 1930 New England League. The 1930 New England League reduced to six teams from eight teams after folding Brockton and Haverhill, remaining as a Class B level league. The New England League folded following the 1930 season before reforming and returning to play in 1933.

In 1933, the New England League reformed. The Brockton Shoemakers briefly returned to play as a minor league affiliate of the New York Giants, playing in a final season as members of the New England League. The six–team Class B level league had the Attleboro Burros, Lowell Lauriers, New Bedford Whalers, Quincy Shipbuilders, Taunton Blues and Worcester Chiefs teams begin league play on May 17, 1933.

Brockton returned to New England League play for a partial season in 1933, joining the league during the season. It would be the last season of play for Brockton, known as the "Shoemakers" and also the end of the Brockton tenure in the New England League. The team played in three cities during the season. On June 6, 1933, Quincy had a 12–6 record when the team moved to become the Nashua Millionaires. On August 8, 1933, Nashua moved to Brockton, The Brockton Shoemakers completed New England League season. The team had a record of 28–47, finishing fifth in the NEL. Quincy (12–6) moved to Nashua June 6; Nashua moved to Brockton August 8. Hal Weafer, Billy Flynn and Paul Wolff served as managers in the three cities. The team placed finished 22.0 games behind the first place New Bedford Whalers.

The New England played the 1933 season with a split-season schedule. Worcester won the first half title and New Bedford the second half title, with the teams scheduled to meet in a playoff. However, the New Bedford Whalers players refused to play in the playoff series. Second-place Lowell was put into the final in place of New Bedford. The series between Lowell and Worcester was tied at one game each when the finals were cancelled on September 17, 1933, due to many weather delays. Lowell and Worcester were then declared co-champions. The New England League folded following the 1933 season, resuming play in 1946 without a Brockton franchise.

Following the 1933 Shoemakers, Brockton was without minor league baseball for close to seventy years. In 2002 Brockton hosted minor league baseball again, as the Brockton Rox began play as members of the independent Northeast League.

== The ballparks ==
Brockton teams played at two ballparks, switching between the two in their seasons of minor league play.

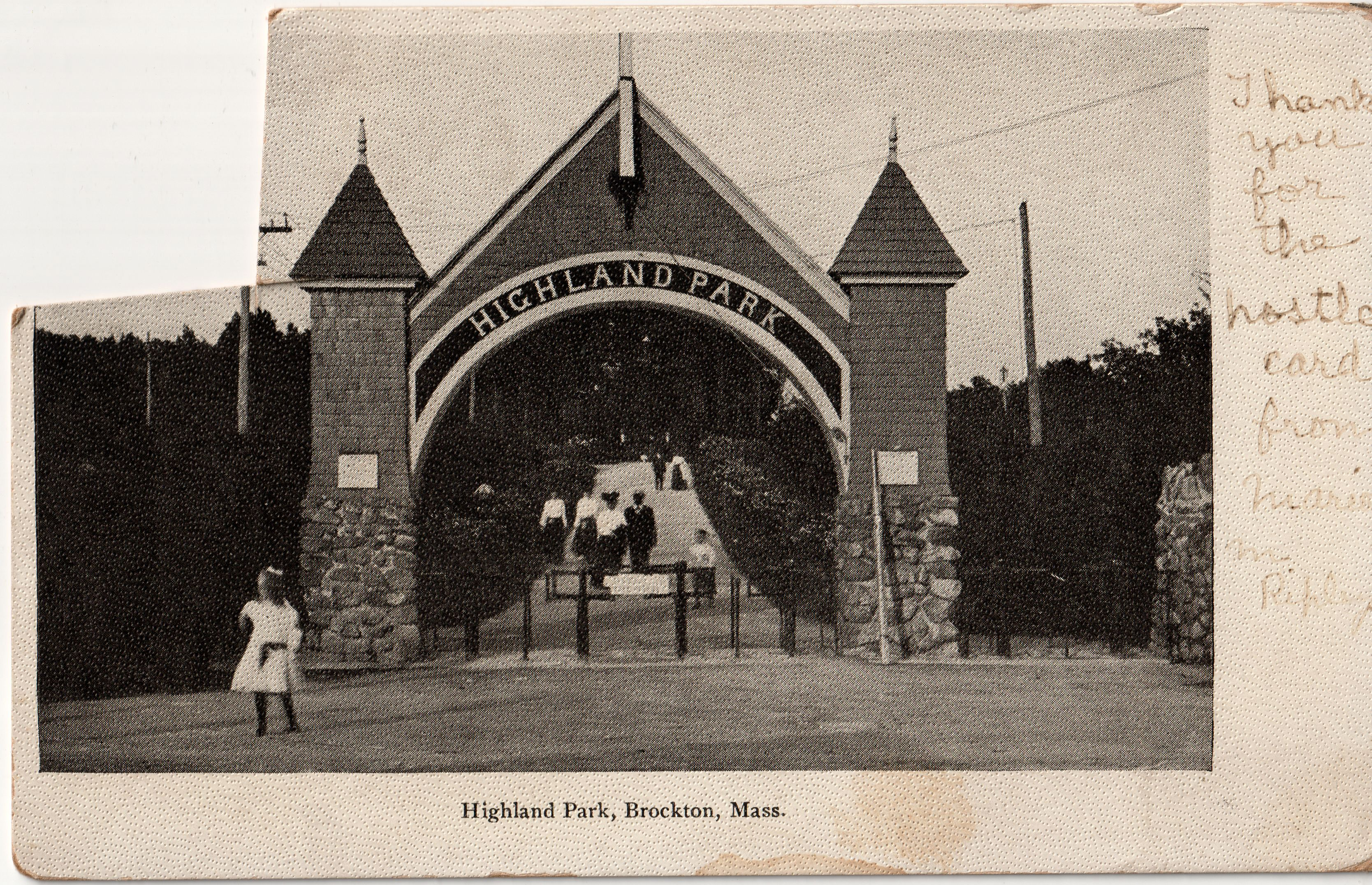
Highland Park in about 1906

Brockton first hosted minor league home games at the Highland Park ballpark. Brockton first played at Highland Park from 1892 through the 1903 season. The Shoemakers then returned to the ballpark for the 1928 and 1929 seasons. Opening day was held at the ballpark on August 11, 1892. Highland Park was owned by the Brockton Street Railway Company. Highland Park itself was an amusement park that had rides and amenities along with the ballpark, Highland Park operated until closing in 1940.

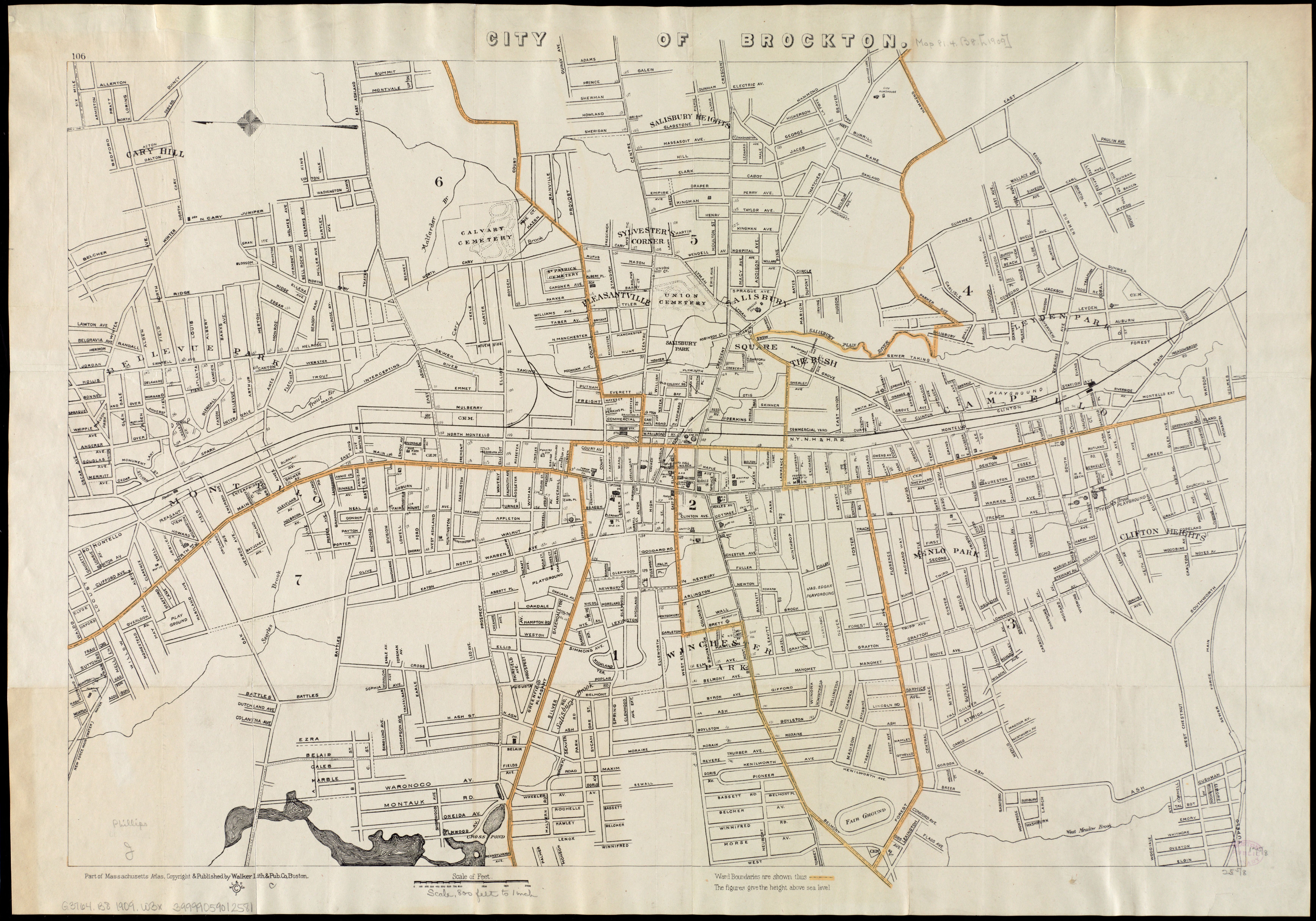
1909 map of Brockton, Massachusetts

Brockton also played minor league home games at the Centre Street Grounds. Brockton played at the ballpark in the 1894 and 1895 seasons. They returned to the park from 1907 to 1915 and again when the franchise resumed play for the end of the 1933 season. Team owner and manager, Stephen Flanigan was the owner of the ballpark. The ballpark was located on Centre Street between Manchester Street and Tyler Street in Brockton. Today, the site corresponds to the location of the John L O'Donnell Playground, which still hosts a ballpark. The address is 282 Center Street in Brockton, Massachusetts.

== Timeline ==
Year(s)	# Yrs.	Team	League	Level	Ballpark	Affiliate
1885	1	Brockton	Eastern New England League	Independent	Highland Park Park	None
1886	1	Brockton	New England League	Independent	Highland Park Park	None
1892-1893	2	Brockton Shoemakers	New England League	Class B	Highland Park Park	None
1894-1895	2	Brockton Shoemakers	New England League	Class B	Centre Street Grounds	None
1896-1899	4	Brockton Shoemakers	New England League	Class B	Highland Park	None
1901 (1)	1	Brockton B's	New England League	Class B	Highland Park	None
1901 (2)	1	Brockton B's	Eastern League	Class A	Highland Park	None
1903	1	Brockton Bees	New England League	Class B	Highland Park	None
1907–1909	3	Brockton Tigers	New England League	Class B	Centre Street Grounds	None
1910-1913	4	Brockton Shoemakers	New England League	Class B	Centre Street Grounds	None
1914–1915	2	Brockton Shoemakers	Colonial League	Class C	Centre Street Grounds	None
1928-1929	2	Brockton Shoemakers	New England League	Class B	Highland Park	None
1933	1	Brockton Shoemakers	New England League	Class B	Centre Street Grounds	Detroit Tigers

== Year–by–year records ==
Year	Record	Place	Manager	Playoffs/notes
1885	48–31	2nd	Bill McGunnigle	No playoffs held
1886	9–26	NA	Bill McGunnigle / Jim Cudworth	No playoffs held
1892	46–45	4th	Bill McGunnigle	No playoffs held
1893	30–51	5th	Fred Doe	No playoffs held
1894	30–62	NA	William Allen / Charles Wilson	Team folded August 25
1895	48–56	6th	R.E. Perrin	No playoffs held
1896	60–44	3rd	Walt Burnham	No playoffs held
1897	70–37	1st (t)	Walt Burnham	Co-champions; No playoffs held
1898	32–16	1st	Walt Burnham	League champions No playoffs held
1899	45–27	NA	Walt Burnham	Team disbanded August 8
1901 (1)	24–16	NA	Walt Burnham	Bangor (22–14) moved to Brockton June 30; Brockton folded July 6.
1901 (2)	45–87	7th	Frank Leonard	Syracuse (28–39) moved to Brockton July 25
1903	46–63	7th	Fred Doe	Brockton (18–23) moved to New Bedford June 27.
1907	59–51	3rd	Stephen Flanagan	No playoffs held
1908	66–56	4th	Stephen Flanagan	No playoffs held
1909	75–48	2nd	Stephen Flanagan	No playoffs held
1910	45–72	8th	Stephen Flanagan	No playoffs held
1911	59–60	6th	Stephen Flanagan	No playoffs held
1912	62–62	5th	Ed McLane	No playoffs held
1913	44–75	8th	Nick Rufiange	No playoffs held
1914	36–71	6th	Willie Reardon / Bert Weeden	No playoffs held Colonial League
1915	57–44	2nd	Bert Weeden	Did not qualify Colonial League
1928	51–48	4th	Lew Courtney	Did not qualify
1929	55–69	6th	Art Ryan	No playoffs held
1933	28–47	5th	Billy Flynn / Paul Wolff	Nashua moved to Brockton August 8

== Notable alumni ==
- Fred Anderson (1912–1913)
- Ed Bagley (1886)
- Mike Balas (1929)
- Tom Bannon (1901, 1908–1909)
- Harry Barton (1895)
- Ernie Beam (1895)
- Frank Beck (1887)
- Curt Bernard (1899)
- George Bignell (1885–1886)
- Harry Blake (1901)
- Tommy Bond (1886)
- Kitty Bransfield (1898)
- Fred Buelow (1896)
- Dan Burke (1886, 1892–1893)
- Dick Burns (1886)
- Jack Burns (1928)
- Buster Burrell (1903)
- Frank Bushey (1928)
- Ed Cassian (1894)
- Tom Catterson (1907–1909)
- Frank Connaughton (1894, 1911)
- John Connor (1886)
- Duff Cooley (1901)
- Jack Corcoran (1894)
- Tom Cotter (1892)
- Ed Coughlin (1886)
- Roscoe Coughlin (1897)
- Ed Crane (1885)
- Lem Cross (1907)
- Jim Cudworth (1885; 1886, 1892, MGR)
- Walter Curley (1901)
- Bill Dam (1910)
- Jumbo Davis (1885–1886)
- Bill Day (1899)
- Shorty Dee (1912)
- Lee DeMontreville (1901)
- Fred Doe (1892; 1893, 1903, MGR)
- Tom Donovan (1895)
- Jerry Donovan (1908)
- John Dowd (1912–1913)
- Pat Duff (1909)
- Andy Dunning (1893)
- Pembroke Finlayson (1908–1909)
- John Fitzgerald (1895)
- Bill Foxen (1903)
- Patsy Flaherty (1901)
- Mike Flynn (1893, 1895)
- Henry Fournier (1894)
- Bob Ganley (1899)
- Gid Gardner (1886)
- Cliff Garrison (1928)
- Chippy Gaw (1911–1912)
- Joe Giannini (1911)
- John Gochnaur (1897–1898)
- John Grady (1885)
- Jim Halpin (1886)
- Paul Hartnett (1892)
- Bill Hawes (1885–1886)
- Bill Hawke (1899)
- Doc Hazelton (1895)
- Olaf Henriksen (1909–1911)
- George Henry (1897–1898)
- Mike Hickey (1893, 1895, 1897)
- John Hofford (1895)
- Fred Holmes (1899)
- Elmer Horton (1901)
- Paul Howard (1911–1913)
- Herb Hunter (1914)
- John Irwin (1892, 1895)
- Merwin Jacobson (1900, 1914–1915)
- Harry Jordan (1894)
- Benny Kauff (1912)
- Frank Kane (1915)
- John Kiley (1886)
- Fred Klobedanz (1908)
- Eddie Kolb (1907)
- Jim Korwan (1895–1896)
- Bill Krieg (1897)
- Henry Lampe (1894)
- Art LaVigne (1910–1911)
- Frank Leonard (1901, MGR)
- Ezra Lincoln (1892)
- Harry Lochhead (1901)
- Walter Lonergan (1911)
- Henry Lynch (1901)
- Toby Lyons (1892)
- Ed MacGamwell (1901)
- Waddy MacPhee (1928)
- Art Madison (1901)
- Bill Magee (1895–1896)
- George Magoon (1896–1898)
- Pat Maloney (1912–1913)
- Gene McAuliffe (1907)
- Jack McCarthy (1894)
- Tommy McCarthy (1886)
- Charlie McCullough (1894–1895)
- Art McGovern (1907–1908, 1910)
- Bill McGunnigle (1885–1887, MGR; 1892)
- Marty McHale (1910)
- Kit McKenna (1896–1898)
- Ed McLane (1909–1911; 1912, MGR)
- Frank McManus (1895, 1901)
- George Meister (1886)
- Dewey Metivier (1928)
- Bob Miller (1895)
- Simmy Murch (1907, 1909)
- Connie Murphy (1903)
- Bert Myers (1901)
- Tricky Nichols (1886)
- Buck O'Brien (1907)
- Tom O'Brien (1894)
- Marty O'Toole (1907–1909)
- Larry Pape (1910)
- Togie Pittinger (1897–1898)
- Ralph Pond (1910)
- Carl Ray (1928)
- Phil Reardon (1907–1908)
- Mike Roach (1901)
- Charlie Robinson (1886)
- John Rudderham (1885, 1892)
- Cyclone Ryan (1893)
- Ed Sales (1886)
- Frank Sexton (1894)
- Frank Shannon (1892, 1909–1910)
- George Sharrott (1895, 1897)
- Jack Sharrott (1898)
- Danny Shay (1899)
- Nap Shea (1894–1898)
- George Shears (1912)
- Jimmy Sheckard (1897)
- Mike Slatterly (1895)
- Jud Smith (1901)
- Klondike Smith (1910–1912)
- Paul Speraw (1914–1915)
- Tom Stankard (1910–1911)
- John Taber (1886)
- Al Tesch (1913)
- Grant Thatcher (1898)
- Red Torphy (1929)
- Bill Upham (1912)
- Jim Wallace (1907)
- Joe Wall (1898)
- Bert Weeden (1910; 1914–1915, MGR)
- Frank Weat (1894)
- Jack White (1901)
- Nick Wise (1895–1896)
- Fred Woodcock (1893)
- Walt Woods (1901)
- Bill Wynne (1895)
- George Yeager (1894)

== See also ==
- Brockton Shoemakers players
- Brockton Tigers players
- Brockton players
- Brockton Pilgrims players
