= Manchester Blue Sox =

- 1926–1930; (1877, 1887–1888, 1891–1893, 1899, 1901–1906, 1914–1915, 1926–1930); Manchester, New Hampshire

Minor league affiliations
- Class: Independent (1877–1878, 1887–1888, 1895); Class F (1899); Class B (1891–1893, 1906, 1914–1915, 1926–1930)
- League: New England Association (1877); New England League (1887–1888, 1891–1893, 1899, 1901–1911)

Major league affiliations
- Team: None

Minor league titles
- League titles (3): 1902; 1926; 1929
- Conference titles (1): 1929
- Wild card berths (0): None

Team data
- Name: Manchester Reds (1877); Manchester (1892–1893, 1901–1905); Manchester Farmers (1887); Manchester Maroons (1888); Manchester Amoskeags (1891); Manchester Manchesters (1899); Manchester Textiles (1906, 1914–1915); Manchester Blue Sox (1926–1930)
- Ballpark: Beech Street Grounds (1877, 1887–1888, 1891–1893); Varich Park (1899, 1901–1906); Textile Field (1914–1915); Athletic Park (1926–1930)

The Manchester Blue Sox were a minor league baseball team based in Manchester, New Hampshire. From 1926 to 1930, the Blue Sox played as members of the Class B level New England League, winning the 1926 and 1929 league championships.

The Manchester Blue Sox teams were preceded New England League play by several Manchester teams. The Manchester teams played under numerous nicknames in the seasons of play beginning in 1877 through the 1915 seasons, winning the 1902 league championship.

The Manchester teams hosted home minor league games a ballpark site that had four different names in the era. Manchester played at the Beech Street Grounds (1877, 1887–1888, 1891–1893, 1899), Varich Park (1901–1906), Textile Field (1914–1915) and Athletic Park, all different names of the same parcel.

The 1946 Manchester Giants resumed Manchester's tenure as a member of the New England League.

== History ==
=== Early minor league teams 1877 to 1899 ===
Minor league baseball began in Manchester, New Hampshire in 1877. The Manchester Reds played as members of the newly formed New England League, also known as the New England Association. The league began play on May 3, 1877, as an eight–team league and ended the season reduced to four teams. The Lowell Ladies Men, with a 33–7 record won the championship, finishing 4.0 games ahead of the second place Manchester "Reds," who finished with a 29–11 record, playing the season under manager Harry Clark. Lowell and Manchester were followed by the Fall River Cascades (19–21) and Providence Rhode Islanders (11–29) teams in the final standings. The Lynn Live Oaks (8–22), Fitchburg, Haverhill and Lawrence franchises all folded before the 1877 New England Association season ended on October 15, 1877. The New England Association folded after the 1877 season.

After a decade hiatus, the Manchester "Farmers" resumed minor league play as the 1887 New England league expanded from six teams to eight-teams and added the Manchester franchise. Managed by Frank Leonard, the Farmers ended the 1887 season with a record of 55–46, placing fourth in the New England League. The Manchester Farmers ended the New England League season 14.5 games behind the first place Lowell Browns in the final standings of the eight-team league, which had reduced to six teams to end the season.

The 1888 Manchester Maroons continued New England League play and ended the season in third place. The Maroons ended the 1888 season with a record of 47–50, Jim Clinton and Herbert Clough served as managers as Manchester finished the season 9.0 games behind the first place Lowell Chippies in the eight-team league. Manchester's Ted Scheffler won the New England league batting championship, hitting .375. Alex Ferson, who split the season between Lowell and Manchester, led the league with both a 1.10 ERA and 25 wins. The New England league folded following the 1888 season, before reforming in 1891.

The 1891 Manchester "Amoskeags" rejoined the Class B level New England League. The Amoskeags finished with a 42–30 record, in third place in the eight–team league. Playing the season under manager Louis Bacon, Manchester ended the season 7.0 games behind the first place Worcester team in the final standings. Jim Connor of Manchester led the New England League with 80 runs scored.

The "Amoskeags" nickname corresponds with the Amoskeag Manufacturing Company, which was located in Manchester in the era.

In 1892, Manchester played a partial season, as the team relocated and folded during the New England League season. On July 2, 1892, Manchester relocated to Lawrence. The team then disbanded before the conclusion of the regular season. The Manchester/Lawrence team had a 26–45 record when the team folded in Lawrence. The 1892 managers were Jim Cudworth and W.J. Freeman.

The Lowell Lowells began the 1893 season in the New England League and moved to Manchester during the season. Another relocation of the franchise saw the team end the season based in Boston, Massachusetts with a last place finish. The Lowell/Manchester/Boston Reds of the New England League ended the 1893 season with a record of 29–55, playing in three cities during the season and finishing in sixth place in the six-team league. Lowell (14–20) transferred to Manchester June 26; Manchester (3–13) then moved to Boston on July 16, 1893. TBill McGunnigle and Thomas H. O'Brien served as managers during the three-city season. The team finished 28.0 games behind the first place Fall River Indians.

The New England League continued play in 1894 without a Lowell, Manchester or Boston franchise in the eight-team league.

In 1899 Manchester "Manchesters" returned to the New England league and ended the season in third place. The Manchesters of the Class F level New England League ended the 1899 season with a record of 55–41 as John Irwin served as the Manchester manager. Manchester attempted to win the second half title on the last day of the season by playing six games with Portland. Manchester won all six games, but the results were thrown out by the league. Manchester ended the season 4.0 games behind the first place Portland Phenoms, managed by their namesake and future Manchester manager Phenomenal Smith.

=== 1901 to 1906 New England League - Manchester Textiles ===
The Manchester team returned to the reformed New England League in 1901. Manchester played under new owner and manager Phenomenal Smith. The Augusta Live Oaks, Bangor Millionaires, Haverhill Hustlers, Lewiston, Lowell Tigers, Nashua and Portland teams joined Manchester in beginning league play on May 15, 1901.

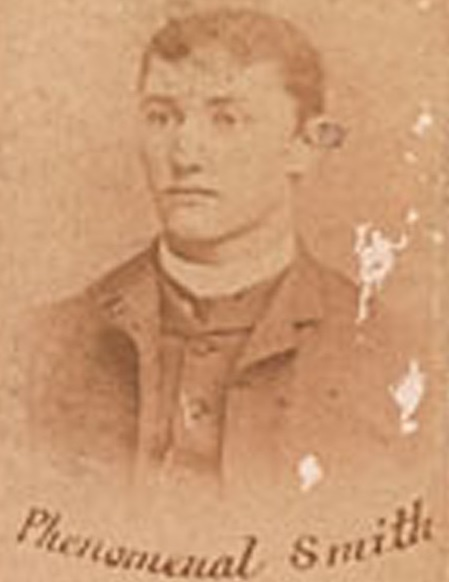
(1888) Phenomenal Smith, Old Judge baseball card. Smith managed the Manchester teams for five seasons and won two New England League batting championships.

The Manchester team finished in third place with a 48–39 record in the 1901 New England League final standings. In the final standings, Manchester finished 4.5 games behind the first place Portland team as the league held no playoffs. Manchester played the season under manager/player Phenomenal Smith, who began a five-season tenure with the team. Phenomenal Smith won the New England League batting championship, hitting .363 on the season. Manchester pitcher Jake Volz had an ERA of 1.49 to lead the league.

The Manchester team continued as members as the Class B level New England League in 1902 and won the league championship. Manchester finished the season in first place in the eight-team league. With a 75–37 record under manager Phenomenal Smith. Manchester ended the season 12.5 games ahead of the second place Haverhill Hustlers in the final standings. Phenomenal Smith again won the New England League batting championship, hitting .369 on the season, while teammate Jim Murray led the league with both 12 home runs and 91 runs scored. Manchester pitcher Frank Morrissey had 27 wins lead the league, while Jake Volz had 220 strikeouts, most in the New England League.

Continuing minor league baseball play in 1903, Manchester placed third in the New England League, one year after winning the league championship. Playing under manager Phenomenal Smith, Manchester placed third in the eight–team, Class B level New England League standings with a final record of 66–44. Manchester finished 5.0 games behind the first place Lowell Tigers. Mancherster's Pinky Swander led the New England League with 140 total hits, while teammate Lou Knau topped the league with 7 home runs and Clark Rapp scored a league leading 68 runs.

In the 1903 and 1904 seasons, Moonlight Graham played for Manchester. Graham was the basis of the character of the same name in the 1989 motion picture Field of Dreams. Shoeless Joe author W.P. Kinsella discovered Graham's name and statistical information in The Baseball Encyclopedia and noticed Graham had played just one major league game with 0 at-bats, Graham became a physician after his baseball career ended. Kinsella based Graham's story the character in his novel. In 1989 Shoeless Joe was adapted into the movie Field of Dreams. The New York Giants purchased Graham's contract from Manchester on September 25, 1904, but he did not appear in a major league game. In 1905, Graham had his brief appearance in a major league game with the Giants.

The 1904 Manchester team placed fourth in the New England League final standings. Manchester ended the season with a 61–60 record in the eight–team league. Manchester finished 20.0 games behind the first place Haverhill Hustlers in the final standings, as Haverhill went from last place to first place in the course of two seasons. The Manchester manager and owner was Phenomenal Smith. Manchester's Jake Volz had 224 strikeouts, to lead New England League pitchers.

Manchester relocated during the 1905 New England League season. On July 20, 1905, Manchester moved to become the Lawrence Colts with a 33–28 record at the time of the move. The team finished the season known as the Taunton Tigers and finished in a distant last place in the eight–team league. After compiling a 19–24 record while based in Lawrence, the team finished with an overall record of 52–54 to place sixth in the eight-team league. Playing the season under manager Win Clark, the team finished 16.0 games behind the first place Concord Marines. Harry Armbruster led the New England League with a .330 batting average, 99 runs scored and 134 total hits.

Despite the franchise relocating a year earlier, the 1906 Manchester "Textiles" returned to New England League play and the league continued as a Class B level league with eight teams, including the Lawrence Colts. The Textiles finished in fifth place as Stephen Flanagan served as manager. With a 57–56 record the Textiles finished 15.5 games behind the first place Worcester Busters in the final standings. Manchester player Simmy Murch hit 4 home runs, which tied for the league lead and pitcher Marty O'Toole had 26 complete games to lead the New England League.

Manchester was replaced by the Brockton Tigers franchise in the 1907 New England League, as Stephen Flanagan managed the Tigers. The Manchester team briefly played as members of the 1907 Maine State League before folding with a 1–7 record under returning manager Phenomenal Smith. Upon retiring from professional baseball after his time with Manchester, smith remained in the Manchester area, where he served as a police officer for 28 years and coached youth teams.

=== 1914 & 1915 New England League - Manchester Textiles ===
In 1914, the Manchester Textiles rejoined the New England League during the season. A former major league manager, Fred Lake was the manager and owner of the New Bedford Whalers of the New England League in 1913. Due to poor attendance, Lake moved the team to Fitchburg, Massachusetts for the 1914 season, after Street Railway in Fitchburg offered to upgrade the ball grounds, build a new grandstand and bleachers, and provide free rent to the team. On July 28, 1914, Fitchburg played its first home game at the refurbished ballpark in Fitchburg. Within days Lake moved the team to Manchester because of poor attendance in Fitchburg. The local Fitchburg paper reported, "there would be no stealing of baseballs from Fred Lake [since] he traveled all the way to the bleachers to get a ball back." On July 30, 1915, the Fitchburg Burghers playing in their first season moved to Manchester with a record of 24–52. After compiling a record of 12–35 while based in Manchester, the team ended the season in last place with a 36–87 record. The Lawrence Barristers won the 1914 New England League championship and finished 48.0 games ahead of the Textiles, who placed eighth in the eight-team league. Fred Lake managed the team in both locations/

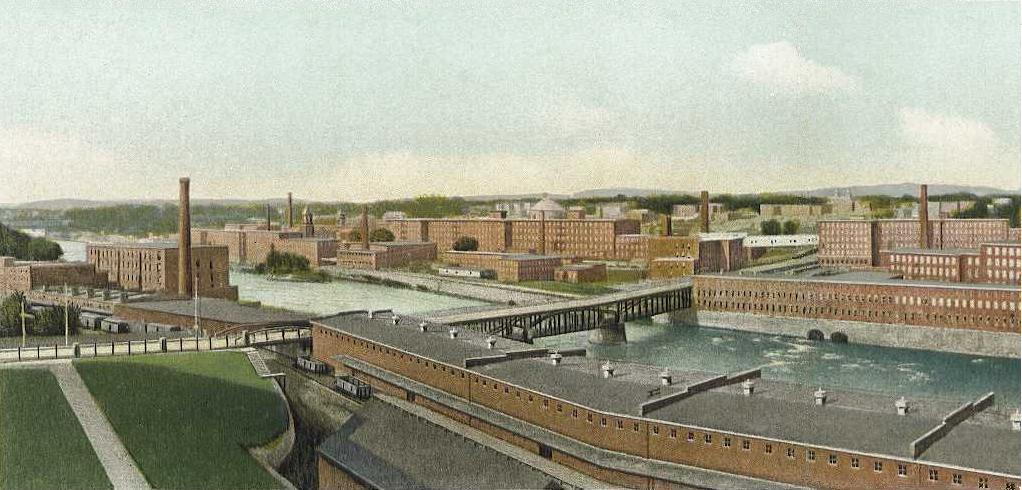
(1911) Postcard. Amoskeag Manufacturing Company, Manchester, New Hampshire.

The Manchester "Textiles" nickname corresponds to local history and industry. In 1837, a group of businessmen from Boston, Massachusetts founded the Amoskeag Manufacturing Company textile mills in Manchester. The company owned 26,000 acres of land in Manchester in its early years. The company folded and the plants closed in 1935.

Both the Fitchburg Burghers and Manchester Textiles franchises returned to New England League play in 1915. In early 1915 Fred Lake had sold the Manchester franchise to Tom Keady, coach of the Lehigh University football and baseball teams. Lake then became the New England League's Supervisor of Umpires. Manchester ended the season in seventh place in the eight-team league. The Textiles finished with a record of 48–67, as John Kiernan served as managers in the New England League standings. The Textiles finishing 27.0 games behind the first place Portland Duffs, managed by Baseball Hall of Fame member Hugh Duffy. After the 1915 season, the Class B level New England League folded.

=== 1926 to 1930 New England League - Manchester Blue Sox ===
In 1925, Jean Dubuc was hired as the manager of the Manchester team that played in the Boston Twilight League. Dubuc would remain in Manchester, managing the minor league team for the 1926 season.

In 1926, the New England League reformed as a Class B level league with eight teams. The Manchester "Blue Sox" joined the Haverhill Hillies, Lawrence Merry Macks, Lewiston Twins, Lowell Highwaymen, Lynn Papooses, Nashua Millionaires and Portland Eskimos teams in beginning play in the reformed league on May 11, 1926.

The Manchester "Blue Sox" began play in the newly formed league and won the 1926 New England League championship. The Manchester Blue Sox finished the season with a 57–35 record to place first in the final standings, as Manchester finished 5.5 games ahead of the second place Lynn Papooses, as no playoffs were held. The 1926 Blue Sox championship manager was Jean Dubuc, who had been involved in a gambling controversy in the decade. Blue Sox player Henry LaVallie led the New England League with 138 total hits.

In 1920, Manchester manager Jean Dubuc had been investigated for his role in the 1919 Chicago Black Sox Scandal. During the 1920 investigation into the Black Sox Scandal, evidence was discovered showing that Sleepy Bill Burns had advised Dubuc through a telegraph that the 1919 World Series had been fixed and that Dubuc should bet on the Cincinnati Reds to win the game that day. Dubuc was a player for the New York Giants at the time. Dubuc was neither a participant nor a conspirator in the scandal itself but was investigated due to his role as a player and his "guilty knowledge" of the scandal. Sources conflict as to whether Dubuc was formally banned from baseball at the conclusion of the investigation, but his baseball managing and scouting career did continue.

After leading Manchester to the New England League championship, Jean Dubuc had a new team in 1927. In December 1926, Dubuc signed a three-year contract to be the head coach of the Brown University baseball team.

In 1926 Clyde Sukeforth went to spring training with the Cincinnati Reds. After the spring ended, Sukeforth was sent to play for the Nashua Millionaires of the Class B New England League, before Reds recalled him in late May, where he made his big-league debut on May 31, 1926. After appearing in four games for the Minneapolis Millers of the American Association, Sukeforth spent the rest of 1926 with the Manchester Blue Sox before making the Reds roster in 1927. Sukeforth became a minor league manager, a major league coach and a scout after his playing career. He is known for scouting and signing both Jackie Robinson and Roberto Clemente. Due to a suspension of manager Leo Durocher, Sukeforth served as the interim manager for the Brooklyn Dodgers in 1947, managing the Dodgers to wins in the first two games of the season, which included Sukeforth making our the lineup card for Robinson's major League debut on April 15, 1947.

On July 21, 1972, Jackie Robinson wrote a letter to Sukeforth that is now preserved at the Baseball Hall of Fame. "Please understand that I do not have any reservations in praise for the role that Clyde Sukeforth played in the growth and development of my beginnings in baseball. I have been very appreciative of the fact that whenever there were problems in the earlier days, I could always go to you, talk with you, and receive the warm and friendly advise that I always did," the letter said in part.

In defending their league championship, the 1927 Manchester Blue Sox ended the New England League season in sixth place. The Blue Sox were led by returning manager Jean Dubuc and his successor Henry LaVallee in 1927. Manchester had a 46–47 record in the regular season, finishing 15.0 games behind the first place Lynn Papooses. Manchester Blue Sox player Len Dugan won the New England League batting title, hitting .364, while pitcher Chuck Wolfe won 15 games to tie for the league lead.

The 1928 Manchester Blue Sox were managed by Henry LaVallie and finished in second place in the New England League standings. The Blue Sox had a 51–43 final regular season record, finishing 2.0 games behind the New England League champion Lynn Papooses. Manchester did not qualify for the playoff final, won by Lynn over the Attleboro Burros. August Snyder of Manchester had a New England League leading 75 RBI, while teammate Billy Jurges had 127 total hits to lead the league.

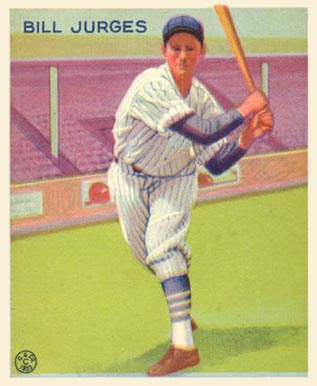
(1932) Billy Jurges, Chicago Cubs. Goudey baseball card. Jugres led the New England league in hits in 1928 while playing for Manchester. Jurges was shot at his hotel while playing for the Cubs in 1932.

In July 1932, Billy Jurges was playing for the Chicago Cubs, when he was shot in room 509 at the Hotel Carlos in Chicago during a domestic incident. Jurges was shot and wounded by Violet Valli, a showgirl with whom Jurges had been in a relationship. Jurges was shot while trying to wrestle the gun away from Valli. Shortly after the shooting, attempted murder charges were dismissed against Valli. Jurges appeared in court and stated that would not testify against Valli and expressed his desire to dismiss the charges against her, which was granted.

In 1929, the Manchester Blue Sox played their final full season and won the New England League championship. The Blue Sox placed first in the eight–team New England League regular season, finishing with a record of 82–47. Manchester ended the season just 0.5 game ahead of the second place Lynn Papooses (81–47) in the final standings to claim the regular season pennant. The league held a final playoff, with Manchester and Lynn advancing. In the playoff, the Blue Sox defeated Lynn 4 games to 1 and captured the New England League championship. Manchester pitcher Johnny Miller won 23 games to lead the New England League, while teammate Walter Hayes had a league best 2.30 ERA.

The Manchester Blue Sox played their final season in 1930, as the six-team New England League folded during the season. The Lewiston Twins and Nashua Millionaires teams both disbanded on June 16, 1930. After continuing play briefly as a four–team league, the New England League folded on June 22, 1930. After the 1930 New England League folded, Manchester ended the season with a record of 9–19 under manager Leo Hartline. The Salem Witches were in first place with a 21–9 record, finishing 11.0 games ahead of the fourth place Blue Sox.

After the Manchester "Indians" played the 1934 season as members of the Northeastern League, Manchester next hosted minor league baseball in 1947 when the Manchester Giants began a tenure of play as members of the New England League. in 2004, Manchester became home to the New Hampshire Fisher Cats, who have continued play as members of the Class AA level Eastern League.

== The ballparks ==
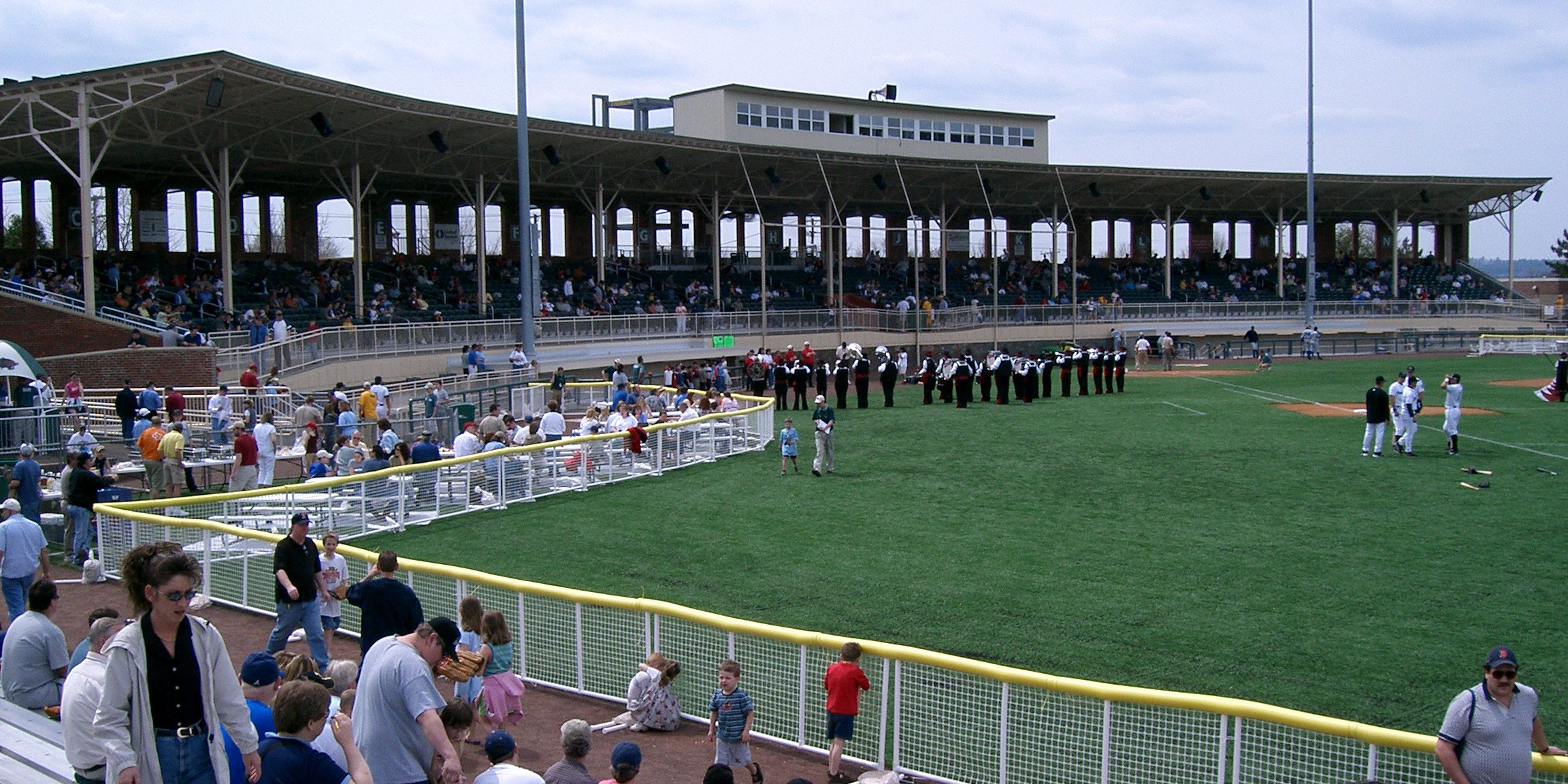
(2004) Gill Stadium. Manchester, New Hampshire. For their duration, the Manchester minor league teams played at the site, which had numerous ballpark names.

Manchester teams played at ballparks on the same site with different names.

A ballpark first called the "Beech Street Grounds" was built on the site of today's Gill Stadium and located at the corner of Beech and Valley Streets. The ballpark was constructed on a site that was owned by the Amoskeag Manufacturing Company. The original ballpark had a wooden fence with two wooden grandstands, with the main fan entrance was located on Beech Street. This was near third base, and home plate was in the field's southwest corner. The other bordering streets were Maple Street to the east and Green Street to the north. Baseball was played there between 1891 and 1894. In 1894, local businessman Thomas Varick purchased an interest in the park, moved the two grandstands and designated one as "men-only." Varick also constructed a 40-foot-wide, quarter-mile dirt bicycle and running track and renamed the complex "Varick Park." The baseball diamond was repositioned with home plate was along the Beech Street side of the field and the fans entrance was off of Valley Street. Besides baseball, Varick Park hosted track-and-field, football and soccer, and outdoor events for the Amoskeag company.

During the 1890s, control of Varick Park passed from Varick to William Freeman. The park was again home to the New England League teams. Beginning in 1901 through 1907, Manchester home games were played at Varich Park. Beginning in 1914, Manchester hosted home minor league games at Textile Field, which was the new name for the Varich Park site. In 1913, a new stadium was constructed on the site by Amoskeag Manufacturing and renamed to be called "Textile Field." The ballpark site was sold to the City of Manchester in 1927 and became known as "Municipal Athletic Field." In 1967, the stadium was renamed to "Gill Stadium."

Today, Gill Stadium is still in use as a multipurpose ballpark for youth sports teams, after having hosted the New Hampshire Fisher Cats in their first minor league season of 2004. The stadium is located at 350 Valley Street in Manchester, New Hampshire.

== Timeline ==
Year(s)	# Yrs.	Team	League	Level	Ballpark
1877	1	Manchester Reds	New England Association	Independent	Beech Street Grounds
1887	1	Manchester Farmers	New England League	Independent	Beech Street Grounds
1888	1	Manchester Maroons	New England League	Independent	Beech Street Grounds
1891	1	Manchester Amoskeags	New England League	Class B	Beech Street Grounds
1892–1893	2	Manchester	New England League	Class B	Beech Street Grounds
1899	1	Manchester Manchesters	New England League	Class F	Varich Park
1901-1905	1	Manchester	New England League	Independent	Varich Park
1906	1	Manchester Textiles	New England League	Class B	Varich Park
1914-1915	2	Manchester Textiles	New England League	Class B	Textile Field
1926-1930	5	Manchester Blue Sox	New England League	Class B	Athletic Park

== Year–by–year records ==
Year	Record	Place	Manager	Playoffs/notes
1877	29–11	2nd	Harry Clark	No playoffs held 9–11 record in International Association games
1887	55–46	4th	Frank Leonard	No playoffs held
1888	47–50	3rd	Jim Clinton / Herbert Clough	No playoffs held
1891	42–30	3rd	Louis Bacon	No playoffs held
1892	26–45	NA	William Freeman / Charles Keefe	Manchester moved to Lawrence July 2 Team folded
1893	29–55	6th	Bill McGunnigle and Thomas H. O'Brien	Lowell (14–20) moved to Manchester June 26; Manchester (3–13) moved to Boston July 16
1899	55–41	3rd	John Irwin	No playoffs held
1901	48–39	2nd	Phenomenal Smith	No playoffs held
1902	75–37	1st	Phenomenal Smith	League champions No playoffs held
1903	66–45	3rd	Phenomenal Smith	No playoffs held
1904	61–60	4th	Phenomenal Smith	No playoffs held
1905	52–54	6th	Win Clark	Manchester (33–28) moved to Lawrence July 20; No playoffs held
1906	57–56	5th	Stephen Flanagan	No playoffs held
1907	1–7	NA	Phenomenal Smith	Team folded
1914	36–87	8th	Fred Lake	Fitchburg (24–52) moved to Manchester July 30. No playoffs held
1915	48–67	7th	John Kiernan	No playoffs held
1926	57–35	1st	Jean Dubuc	League champions No playoffs held
1927	46–47	6th	Jean Dubuc / Henry LaVallee	No playoffs held
1928	51–43	2nd	Henry LaVallee	Did not qualify
1929	82–47	1st	Win Clark	League champions Defeated Lynn 4 games 1
1930	9–19	4th	Leo Hartline	League folded June 22

== Notable alumni ==
- Wyman Andrus (1891)
- Harry Armbruster (1904–1905)
- Marty Barrett (1887)
- Wes Blogg (1877)
- George Bone (1899)
- Joe Bradshaw (1929)
- Jim Canavan (1887)
- John Carl (1877)
- Jack Carney (1887–1899)
- Bill Carrick (1904)
- Win Clark (1902–1903; 1905, 1929, MGR)
- Spider Clark (1888)
- Jim Clinton (1888, MGR)
- Ed Cogswell (1877)
- Jim Connor (1891)
- Henry Cote (1902–1905)
- Lem Cross (1891, 1905–1906)
- Jim Cudworth (1893, MGR)
- John Curran (1879)
- Sammy Curran (1899)
- John Dailey (1877)
- Bill Day (1901)
- Jack Doyle (1888)
- Jean Dubuc (1926, MGR)
- Andy Dunning (1891)
- Joe Dwyer (1927)
- Frank Eustace (1906)
- Joe Farrell (1887)
- Alex Ferson (1887–1899)
- Carl Fischer (1926)
- Barney Gilligan (1888)
- John Grady (1888)
- Moonlight Graham (1903–1904)
- Jim Halpin (1887)
- Ollie Hanson (1929)
- Scott Hardesty (1904)
- Bill Hawes (1901–1905)
- Thorny Hawkes (1877)
- Hanson Horsey (1915)
- Bill Irwin (1888)
- John Irwin (1899, MGR)
- Billy Jurges (1927–1928)
- Charlie Jordan (1904)
- Nate Kellogg (1888)
- John Kelty (1888)
- John Kelly (1901–1905)
- Pat Kilhullen (1914–1915)
- Billy Klusman (1888))
- Harry Koons (1887)
- Fred Lake (1899; 1900, 1914, MGR)
- John Leighton (1891)
- Bill Leith (1903–1905))
- Jack Leary (1877)
- Frank Leonard (1888, MGR))
- Henry Lynch (1901)
- Dan Mahoney (1888)
- Mike Mahoney (1899)
- Tim Manning (1888)
- Jack McCarthy (1891)
- Pat McCauley (1892–1893)
- Michael McDermott (1887–1888)
- Sandy McDermott (1887)
- Sandy McDougal (1899)
- Dan McGeehan (1915)
- Art McGovern (1906)
- Bill McGunnigle (1893, MGR)
- Bill Merritt (1903, 1905)
- Doc Miller (1903)
- Ed Mincher (1877)
- Dave Morey (1915)
- Frank Morrissey (1899, 1902–1905)
- John Morrissey (1901–1905)
- Simmy Murch (1906)
- Jim Murray (1902–1903)
- Tom Niland (1899)
- Dan O'Leary (1878)
- John O'Rourke (1877)
- Marty O'Toole (1906)
- Frederick V. Ostergren (1914)
- Tom Padden (1928)
- John Rainey (1891)
- Ernie Ross (1901)
- Ed Rowen (1878–1879)
- Paul Russell (1899)
- Lou Say (1877)
- Ted Scheffler (1887–1888, 1904)
- John Shoupe (1888)
- Scottie Slayback (1929)
- Phenomenal Smith (1901–1904, MGR; 1905–1906; 1907, MGR)
- Tom Smith (1899)
- Wally Snell (1915)
- Clyde Sukeforth (1926)
- Andy Sullivan (1901)
- Bill Sullivan (1878)
- Jim Sullivan (1899)
- Pinky Swander (1902–1903)
- Charlie Sweasy (1877)
- Rooney Sweeney (1888)
- Jim Tipper (1877)
- Red Torphy (1914)
- Dasher Troy (1887)
- George Ulrich (1899)
- Jake Volz (1901–1902, 1904–1905)
- Oscar Walker (1877)
- Billy West (1877)
- Harry Wheeler (1888)
- Jesse Whiting (1901–1903, 1905))
- Art Whitney (1893)
- Wash Williams (1887)
- Gary Wilson (1905))
- Chuck Wolfe (1926–1928)
- George Wood (1879)
- Red Woodhead (1877)

== See also ==
- Manchester Blue Sox players
- Manchester Textiles players
- Manchester Amskoegs players
- Manchester Manchesters players
- Manchester (minor league baseball) players
- Manchester Maroons players
- Manchester Farmers players
