= Fall River, Massachusetts minor league baseball history =

Fall River, Massachusetts minor league baseball teams
- 1877–1949; (1877, 1893–1898, 1902–1915, 1946–1949); Fall River, Massachusetts

Minor league affiliations
- Class: Independent (1877, 1893–1894); Class B (1895–1898); Class D (1908–1913); Class C (1914); Independent (1915); Class B (1946–1949)
- League: New England Association (1877); League Alliance (1877); New England League (1893–1898, 1902–1913); Colonial League (1914–1915); New England League (1946–1949)

Major league affiliations
- Team: Chicago White Sox (1946–1949)

Minor league titles
- League titles (5): 1893; 1894; 1895; 1896; 1914

Team data
- Name: Fall River Cascades (1877); Fall River Indians (1893–1910); Fall River Brinies (1911-1912); Fall River Adopted Sons (1913); Fall River Spindles (1914–1915); Fall River Indians (1946–1949)
- Ballpark: Athletic Grounds (1893–1898, 1902-1915); Fall River Stadium (1946–1949)

Minor league baseball teams were based in Fall River, Massachusetts between 1877 and 1949. Fall River teams played as members of the New England Association (1877), League Alliance (1877), New England League (1893–1898, 1902–1913), Colonial League (1914–1915) and New England League (1946–1949), winning five league championships. Fall River hosted home minor league games at the Athletic Grounds beginning in 1893 through 1915 and at Fall River Stadium from 1946 to 1949.

The Fall River Indians were a minor league affiliate of the Chicago White Sox from 1946 to 1949.

Baseball Hall of Fame members Ned Hanlon in 1877, Nap Lajoie in 1896 and Roger Connor in 1897 played for Fall River teams.

== History ==
=== New England Association 1877 / League Alliance 1877 ===
In 1877, minor league baseball began in Fall River, when the Fall River Cascades played in two leagues in their first season. Initially, Fall River became charter members of the eight–team New England Association and also played in the 1877 League Alliance.

The Fall River Cascades placed 3rd in the 1877 New England Association, compiling a 19–21 record under manager Jim Mutrie. The New England Association folded after the 1877 season. The Cascades had corresponding play in the 1877 League Alliance, where the team finished 2–12 in alliance contests. The League Alliance structure also folded after the 1877 season.

Baseball Hall of Fame member Ned Hanlon played for the 1877 Falls River Cascades at age 19.

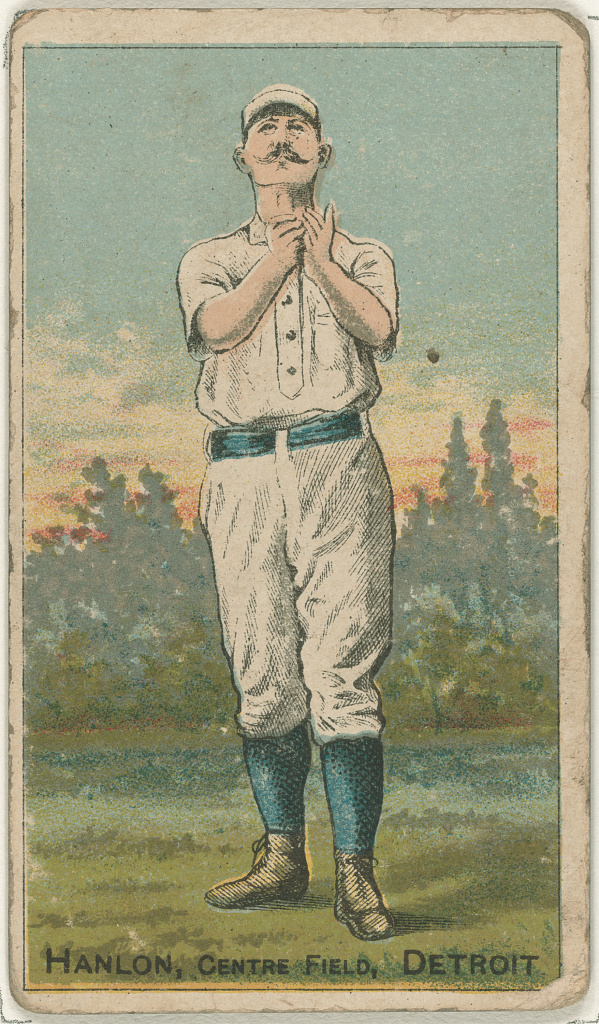
(1881) Ned Hanlon, Detroit Wolverines, baseball card

=== New England League 1893 to 1898 ===
In 1893 the Fall River Indians joined the six–team New England League and won the first of four consecutive league championships.

Capturing their first New England League championship, the 1893 Fall River Indians ended the regular season with a 60–30 record playing home games at the Athletic Grounds. Fall River placed first in the standings under manager Mike McDermott, finishing 5.5 games ahead of second place Lewiston. The New England League had no playoffs, using the regular season standings to determine the league champions. On July 5, 1893, Fall River Indian pitcher Ezra Lincoln threw the first Fall River No-hitter in a 9–0 victory over Dover.

McDermott and the Fall River Indians defended their championship in 1894 as the New England League expanded to eight teams. The Indians again finished first in the New England League standings, ending the 1894 season 7.5 games ahead of second place Haverhill with a record of 62–35.

The 1895 Fall River Indians won the championship again as the New England League became a Class B level league. With Mike McDermott again managing the Indians, Fall River ended the regular season with a 67–39 record. Fall River finished 6.5 games ahead of the second place New Bedford Whalers and 11.0 games ahead of the third place Bangor Millionaires in the final standings of the eight–team league.

The Fall River Indians won their fourth consecutive New England League Championship in 1896, with a future Hall of Fame player on the roster. Falls River completed the season with a record of 68–39 behind manager Charley Marston. The Indians finished 2.5 games ahead of the second place Bangor Millionaires in the final standings.

Baseball Hall of Fame member Nap Lajoie left his $7.50 per week job as a taxi driver to join the 1896 Fall River Indians. Lajoie played as a center fielder, first baseman and catcher for the Indians, while earning $25 per week at age 22.

With the Indians in 1896, Nap Lajoie hit .429 with 17 triples, 15 home runs, slugging .726 for Fall River. Indians owner Charlie Marston rejected an offer of $500.00 from the Pittsburgh Pirates for Lajoie, who was also scouted by the Philadelphia Phillies and Boston Beaneaters. On August 9, 1896, the Philadelphia Phillies purchased Lajoie and Indian teammate Phil Geier from Fall River for $1,500. Phillies' manager Billy Nash originally went to Fall River to sign Geier, but obtained Lajoie when the team agreed to include him in their asking price. Lajoie made his major league debut shortly after being obtained.

The Fall River Indians championship run ended in 1897. Fall River ended the 1897 New England League season with a 47–59 record, as Mike McDermott and owner Charley Marston served as managers. The Indians finished 22.5 games behind the champion Brockton Shoemakers and Newport Colts who tied in the six–team New England League final standings with identical records.

Baseball Hall of Fame member Roger Connor played for the Fall River Indians in 1897 at age 39, hitting .287 in 47 games after beginning the 1897 season with the St. Louis Browns.

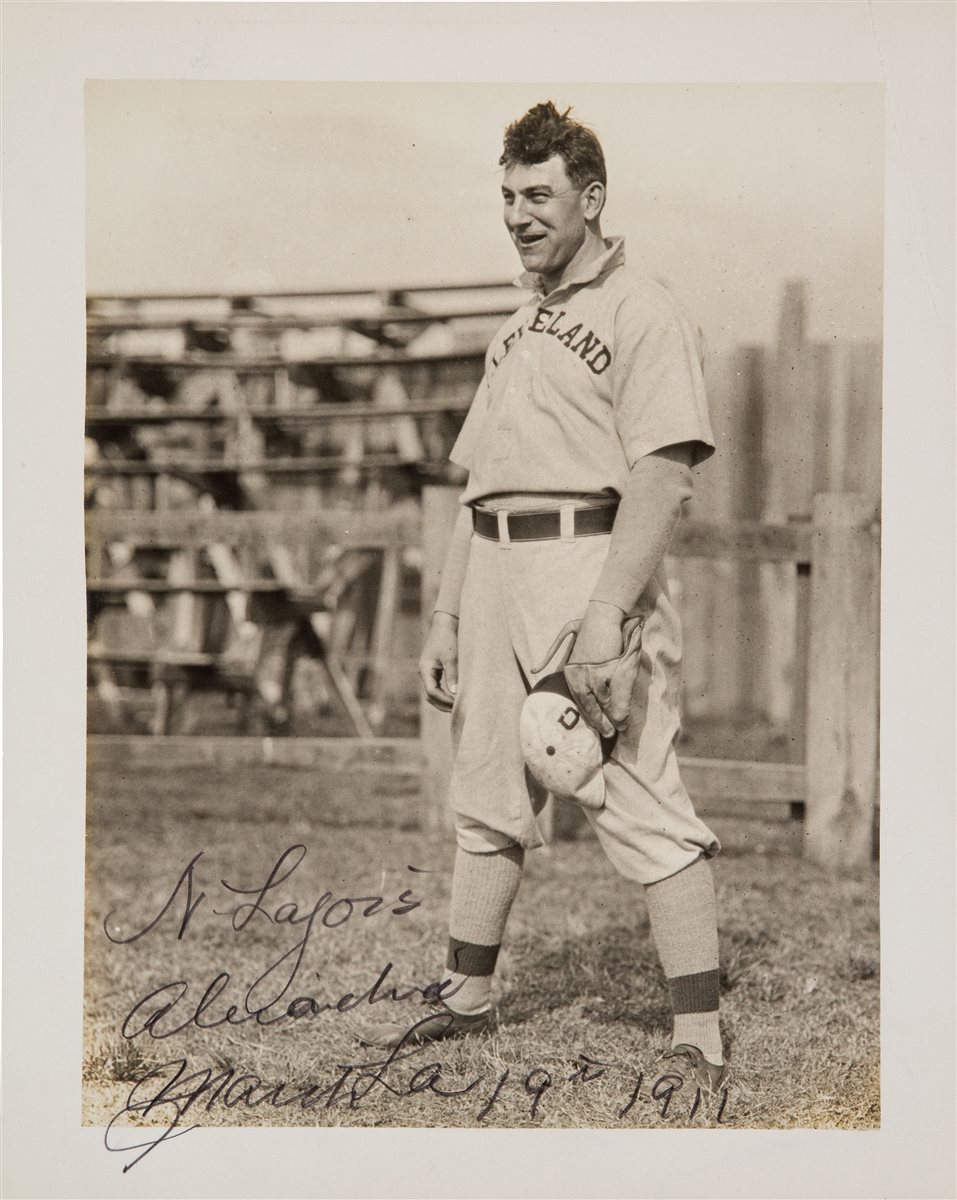
(1911) Nap Lajoie. Cleveland Naps

The Fall River Indians placed third in the six–team 1898 Class B New England League standings. Fall River ended with a 28–25 record under Manager Phenomenal Smith, finishing 6.5 games behind the first place Brockton Shoemakers and percentage points behind the second place Pawtucket Tigers. On June 22, 1898, Indians pitcher Tom Flanagan threw a no–hitter. Flanagan defeated the Brockton Shoemakers 5–0.

The Fall River franchise folded after the 1898 season and did not return to the 1899 New England League.

=== New England League 1902 to 1913 ===
In 1902, the Fall River Indians resumed play, returning to the eight–team Class B level New England League and playing home games at Athletic Park. The Fall River Indians finished last in the 1902 New England League standings. The Indians finished with a record of 37–74, as Sandy McDermott served as manager, beginning a five-year tenure. Falls River finished 37.5 games behind first place Manchester.

Fall River placed fifth in the 1903 New England League standings. With a 57–56 record, the Indians finished 15.0 games behind the first place Lowell Tigers in the final standings. Sandy McDermott served his second season as the Fall city manager as the Indians continued play in the eight–team Class B league.

With Sandy McDermott continuing as manager, the Fall River Indians placed third in the 1904 New England League. Fall River ended the season with a 65–60 record in the eight–team league, finishing 18.0 games behind the first place Haverhill Hustlers (82–41) in the final standings.

The 1905 New England League standings saw the Fall River Indians finish a close second place. Fall River ended the season with a record of 66–40, finishing 2.0 games behind the first place Concord Marines, who had a 69–39 record. Sandy McDermott again managed the Indians.

With the Indians placing sixth in the eight–team 1906 New England League, Sandy McDermott managed the Fall River for the final time. Ending the season with a record of 55–59, Fall River finished 18.0 games behind the champion Worcester Busters in the final standings.

Manager John O'Brien began a six–season tenure as the 1907 Fall River Indians placed fifth in the Class B level New England League. The Indians ended the 1907 season with a record of 56–56, finishing 20.0 games behind the first place Worcester Busters.

As the Worcester Busters again won the league championship, the Fall River Indians placed sixth in the 1908 New England League. Fall River had a final record of 53–70 under the direction of manager John O'Brien, finishing 26.5 games behind Worcester in the eight–team league.

The 1909 Fall River Indians placed fourth in the New England League, as Worcester again won the championship. With a 71–53, record, Fall City finished 6.0 games out of first place, as John O'Brien again managed the Indians.

The Fall River Indians of the New England League ended the 1910 season with a record of 61–60. Fall River placed fifth in the standings under manager John O'Brien, finishing 15.0 games behind the first place New Bedford Whalers. On June 8, 1910, Fall River pitcher Harry Wormwood threw an 11–inning no-hitter against the Worcester Busters. Wormwood and Fall River won the game 1–0.

The Fall River franchise changed monikers and became the Fall River Brinies for the 1911 New England League season. The Brinies ended the 1911 season with a 59–57 season record, as John O'Brien served as manager. The Brinies placed fourth in the standings, finishing 14.0 games behind the first place Lowell Tigers. Fall River had pitchers throw three no–hitters in 1911. On June 7, 1911, Fred Reiger defeated Haverhill 7–2, throwing the first of the three no–hitters. Fred Blum defeated Lawrence 4–0 in a 7–inning game on July 31, 1911, completing the second no–hitter. On August 28, 1911, Harry Wormwood threw his second Fall River no–hitter and the team's third of the season, pitching a 13–inning no–hitter against Lawrence in a game that ended in a 0–0 tie.

The 1912 Fall River Brinies continued play and finished last in the eight–team New England League. With John O'Brien finishing his tenure as manager, Fall River finished with a 46–74 record. The first place Lawrence Barristers (76–47) were 28.5 games ahead of the Brinies in the league standings. On May 29, 1912, Harry Wormwood threw his third Fall River no–hitter against Worcester. Wormwood threw 12–innings of no–hit ball in a game that ended with a 2–2 tie.

The 1913 team had a new nickname, becoming known as the Fall River Adopted Sons continued play in the 1913 New England League. Ending the season in seventh place, the Fall River Adopted Sons had a 45–76 record under manager Dan Clohecy. Fall River finished 33.5 games behind the champion Lowell Grays.

=== Colonial League 1914 & 1915 ===
Fall River switched leagues, nicknames and captured the 1914 Colonial League Championship. Fall River did not return to the 1914 New England League, as the franchise joined the 1914 six–team Class C level Colonial League, playing as the Fall River Spindles. The Fall River Spindles ended the 1914 season with a record of 62–37, finishing 2.5 games ahead of the second place New Bedford Whalers, as John Kiernan was manager of the championship team. On June 18, 1915, Merdic McLeod, pitching for Fall River, threw a no–hitter against the Springfield Tips in a 3–0 Fall River victory.

In 1915, the Colonial League essentially became the minor league feeder for the Federal League, a structure that was a financial downfall for the Colonial League. The league folded after the 1915 season, with defending champion Fall River folding before the end of the 1915 season.

The Fall River Spindles disbanded on July 10, 1915. The Spindles ended the 1915 season with a record of 22–24, as the Taunton franchise disbanded with Fall River on July 10. Frank Connaughton and Bill Phoenix served as managers of the Spindles in their shortened season.

=== New England League 1946 to 1949 ===
In 1946, Fall River returned to minor league play. Fall River returned to play as members the Class B level New England League, which reformed for the 1946 season with eight teams. The Fall River Indians resumed play as a minor league affiliate of the Chicago White Sox and began playing home games at Fall River Stadium. The Fall River Indians placed seventh in 1946 New England League regular season standings and did not qualify for the playoffs, finishing 53.0 games behind the first place Lynn Red Sox. With a record of 30–94, Falls River placed seventh in the standings, playing the season under manager Jack Burns.

Manager Jack Burns returned to the minor leagues as a manager after his major league playing career ended. Beginning in 1955, Burns spent five seasons (1955–59) as a Boston Red Sox coach third base coach under team manager Pinky Higgins. In 1960, Burns then became a scout for Boston and is credited with scouting, recommending and signing Baseball Hall of Fame catcher Carlton Fisk. Fisk was the Red Sox's first-round pick in the January 1967 Major League Baseball draft.

The 1947 Fall River Indians continued as an affiliate of the Chicago White Sox, a relationship which continued in subsequent seasons. Fall River played under manager Joe Holden and finished the 1947 season with a record of 49–76, placing sixth in the New England League regular season standings, finishing 37.5 games behind the first place Lynn Red Sox. Season attendance at Fall River Stadium was 57,468, an average of 919 per game.

The 1948 Fall River Indians finished last in the New England League. Fall River ended the 1948 season with a record of 38–87, placing eighth in the standings, finishing 47.0 games behind the first place Lynn Red Sox. Frank Zubik and Luke Urban were the 1948 managers. Playing at Fall River Stadium, the overall home attendance was 22,589, an average of 361.

The Fall River Indians played their final season in 1949. The Fall River Indians played their final game on July 19, 1949, After falling to the Nashua Dodgers 10–5, the Indians withdrew from the league with a 27–42 record. The Lynn and Manchester franchises folded on the same day.

The New England League folded following the 1949 season. Minor league baseball has not returned to Fall River.

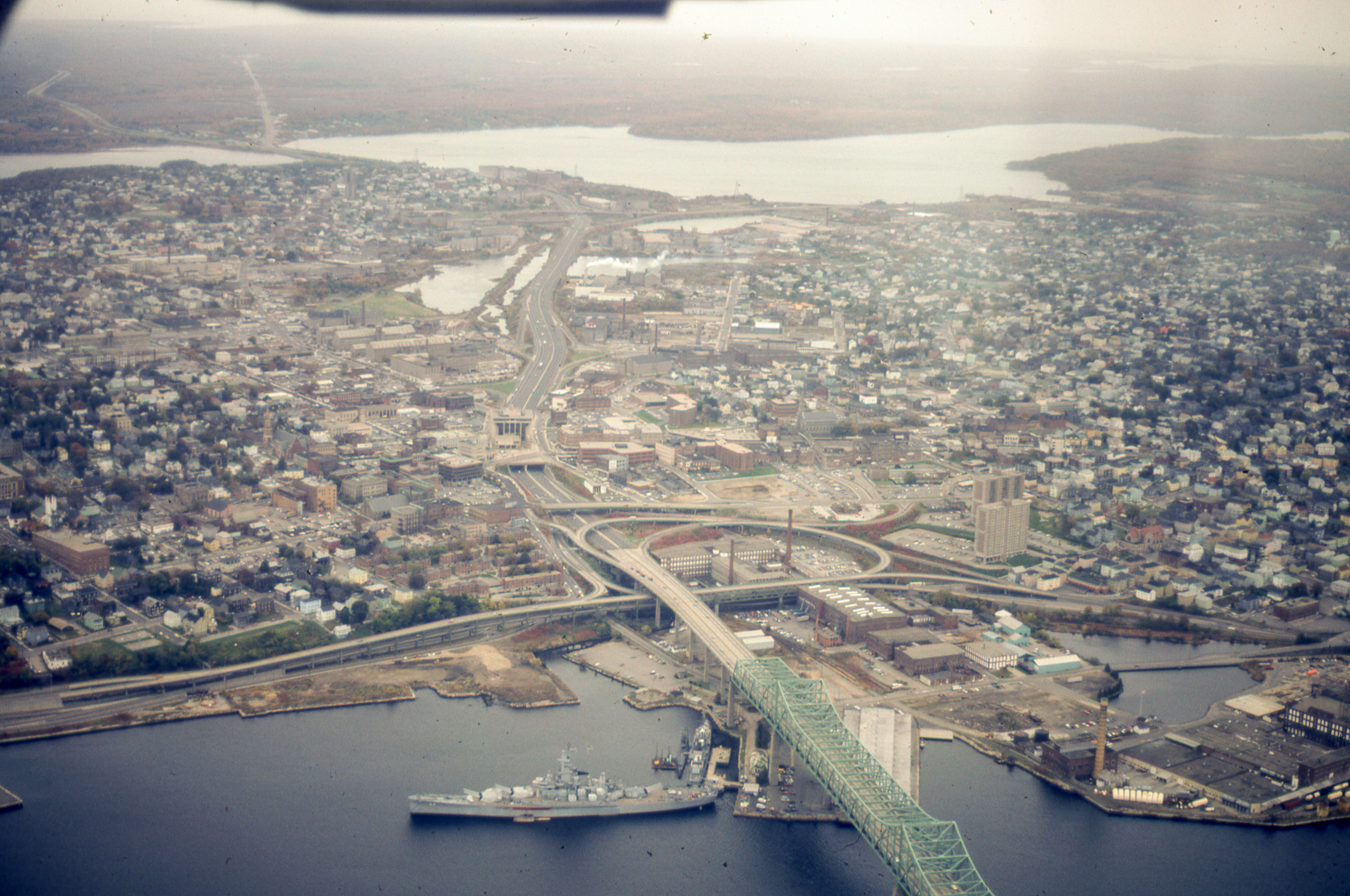
(2020) Aerial view. Fall River, Massachusetts

== The ballparks ==
from 1893 to 1915, Fall River teams played home games at the Athletic Grounds. Also known as the "Bedford Street Grounds" (1893–1898), the ballpark had a capacity of 3,000. The Athletic Grounds were located on Bedford Street at Oak Grove Avenue & Beattie Street in Fall River, Massachusetts.

The Fall River Indians played home games at Fall River Stadium from 1946 to 1949. The ballpark was located at Wordell Street & Plymouth in Fall River, Massachusetts. The site today is still in use as a soccer field.

== Timeline ==
Year(s)	# Yrs.	Team	Level	League	Affiliate	Ballpark
1877 (1)	1	Fall River Cascades	Independent	New England Association	None	Athletic Grounds
1877 (2)	1	Fall River Cascades	Independent	League Alliance	None	Athletic Grounds
1893–1894	2	Fall River Indians	Independent	New England League	None	Athletic Grounds
1895–1898	4	Fall River Indians	Class B	New England League	None	Athletic Grounds
1902–1910	9	Fall River Indians	Class B	New England League	None	Athletic Grounds
1911–1912	2	Fall River Brinies	Class B	New England League	None	Athletic Grounds
1913	1	Fall River Adopted Sons	Class B	New England League	None	Athletic Grounds
1914	1	Fall River Spindles	Class C	Colonial League	None	Athletic Grounds
1915	1	Fall River Spindles	Independent	Colonial League	None	Athletic Grounds
1946–1949	4	Fall River Indians	Class B	New England League	Chicago White Sox	Fall River Stadium

== Notable alumni ==
- Roger Connor (1897) inducted Baseball Hall of Fame, 1976
- Ned Hanlon (1877) inducted Baseball Hall of Fame, 1996
- Nap Lajoie (1896) inducted Baseball Hall of Fame, 1937
- Hugh Bedient (1910)
- Curt Bernard (1898)
- George Brickley (1915)
- Benny Bowcock (1902-1906, 1908–1912)
- George Bristow (1896)
- Jack Burns (1946, MGR)
- Buster Burrell (1893)
- Art Butler (1910, 1912)
- Jack Cameron (1908)
- Bill Carrick (1904-1905)
- Jim Connor (1897)
- Joe Connor (1897, 1907–1908)
- Fred Cooke (1894)
- Jack Cronin (1897-1898)
- Bill Day (1904)
- Joe Delahanty (1897)
- Fred Doe (1897)
- Mike Donovan (1908)
- Pat Duff (1897)
- Frank Dupee (1902)
- Tom Earley (1946)
- Frank Fennelly (1893)
- Alex Ferson (1895)
- William Fischer (1909)
- Ed Flanagan (1894)
- Phil Geier (1896)
- Billy Gilbert (1897)
- George Gore (1877)
- Mert Hackett (1877)
- Joe Harrington (1893-1895, 1898)
- Joe Harris (1903-1905)
- Dave Howard (1913-1914)
- Tom Hurd (1947)
- Happy Iott (1903-1904)
- Bill Karns (1902)
- Jack Katoll (1898)
- Doc Kennedy (1895-1896)
- Fred Klobedanz (1894, 1896)
- Larry Kopf (1911) Cincinnati Reds Hall of Fame
- Charlie Kuhns (1897)
- Hi Ladd (1893-1894, 1896–1898, 1904)
- Henry Lampe (1896)
- Steve Libby (1877)
- Ezra Lincoln (1893-1894, 1896))
- Michael McDermott (1893-1895, 1897, MGR)
- Sandy McDermott (1902-1906, MGR)
- Art McGovern (1913)
- Bill McGunnigle (1877)
- Frank McManus (1897-1898))
- Bobby Messenger (1907-1908)
- Ralph Miller (1897)
- Willie Mills (1896)
- Cy Morgan (1903)
- Danny Murphy (1897)
- Jim Mutrie (1877, MGR)
- Andy O'Connor (1907)
- Kid O'Hara (1906)
- Joe Patanelli (1947)
- Rube Peters (1915)
- Bob Peterson (1904)
- Tom Raftery (1902)
- Ernie Ross (1902)
- Ed Rowen (1877)
- Ossee Schreckengost (1897)
- Biff Sheehan (1894)
- Phenomenal Smith (1898, MGR)
- Stub Smith (1898)
- Allan Sothoron (1913)
- Gene Steere (1902)
- Dummy Stephenson (1895)
- Jack Stivetts (1897)
- Andy Sullivan (1902)
- Jack Sullivan (1910)
- Doc Tonkin (1906)
- Tom Walker (1898)
- Bert Weeden (1914)
- Frank Whitman (1947)
- Pop Williams (1896)
- Nick Wise (1897)
- Arthur C. Woodward
- Dan Woodman (1913)
- George Yankowski (1946-1947)

== See also ==
- Fall River Adopted Sons players
- Fall River Brienies players
- Fall River Casscade players
- Fall River Indians players
- Fall River Spindles players
