= Waddy MacPhee =

American baseball player (1899–1980)

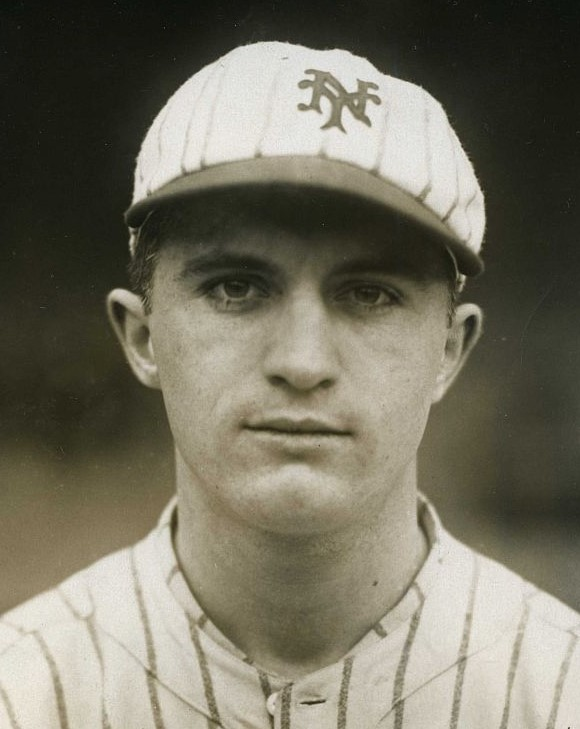
- Third baseman
- Born: December 23, 1899; Brooklyn, New York, US
- Died: January 20, 1980 (aged 80); Charlotte, North Carolina, US
- Batted: Right Threw: Right

MLB debut
- September 27, 1922, for the New York Giants

Last MLB appearance
- September 30, 1922, for the New York Giants

MLB statistics
- Batting average: .286
- Home runs: 0
- Runs batted in: 0
- Stats at Baseball Reference

Teams
- New York Giants (1922)

Waddy MacPhee
Profile
- Position: Running back

Personal information
- Listed height: 5 ft 8 in (1.73 m)
- Listed weight: 160 lb (73 kg)

Career information
- High school: Erasmus Hall High School
- College: Princeton University

Career history
- Waterbury Blues (1924); Providence Steamrollers (1926)
- Stats at Pro Football Reference

Walter Scott "Waddy" MacPhee (December 23, 1899 – January 20, 1980) was an American professional baseball player for Major League Baseball's New York Giants, and an American football player for the NFL's Providence Steam Rollers.

== Early life ==
Born in Brooklyn, New York, MacPhee attended Erasmus Hall High School, where he was class president, played football, and was captain of the baseball and ice hockey teams. He went on to play all three sports at Princeton University, and was captain of the Princeton baseball team as a senior in 1922.

== Baseball career ==
Upon graduating from Princeton in 1922, MacPhee was signed by the New York Giants and Baseball Hall of Fame manager John McGraw. MacPhee played in two games for the eventual World Series champions during their 1922 season, his only two major league appearances. His first appearance came at third base on September 27 in the second game of a doubleheader against the Philadelphia Phillies at the Polo Grounds. MacPhee recorded a hit and a walk in four plate appearances against Phillies pitcher Jimmy Ring, and scored the tying run in the Giants' 3–2 victory. His second and final appearance came three days later in another back end of a doubleheader at the Polo Grounds, this time against the Boston Braves and hurler Garland Braxton. MacPhee again manned third base, and went 1–for–4 with a triple and a run scored in the Giants' 5–3 win. In two major league games, MacPhee batted .286 with a walk and two runs scored, and committed one error in nine fielding chances.

In 1923, MacPhee played for the Denver Bears of the Western League, batting .280 with 182 hits. He spent 1924 and 1925 with the Pittsfield Hillies of the Eastern League, and played for various teams in that league through 1928. In 1929, he played for the Brockton Shoemakers of the New England League, and also played shortstop for Falmouth in the Cape Cod Baseball League, helping lead the team to the league pennant. He returned to Falmouth in 1930, but switched to the league's Osterville team mid-season.

== Football career ==
A multi-sport professional athlete, MacPhee played in 10 games as a running back for the NFL's Providence Steam Rollers during their 1926 season under head coach Jim Laird.

== Later life ==
MacPhee was married to Jennie Call, and served for three years in the United States Navy during World War II. He taught high school history for 40 years at East Providence High School, Tome School, and Manlius School, from which he retired in 1968. MacPhee died in Charlotte, North Carolina in 1980 at age 80.

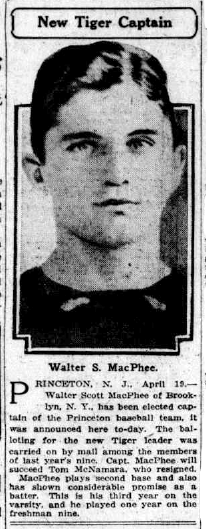
1922 New York Herald clipping picturing MacPhee as Princeton baseball captain
