= Fred Doe =

American baseball player (1864–1938)

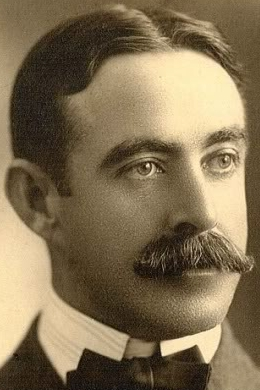
- Pitcher
- Born: April 18, 1864; Gloucester, Massachusetts, U.S.
- Died: October 4, 1938 (aged 74); Quincy, Massachusetts, U.S.
- Batted: Right Threw: Right

MLB debut
- August 23, 1890, for the Buffalo Bisons

Last MLB appearance
- August 30, 1890, for the Pittsburgh Burghers

MLB statistics
- Win–loss record: 0–1
- Earned run average: 9.00
- Strikeouts: 4
- Stats at Baseball Reference

Teams
- Buffalo Bisons (1890); Pittsburgh Burghers (1890)

Alfred George "Fred" Doe (April 18, 1864 – October 4, 1938) was an American professional baseball pitcher who played in the minor leagues from 1886 to 1902, and in the Players' League (PL) in 1890. Doe played in one game for both the Buffalo Bisons and the Pittsburgh Burghers in 1890.

== Early life ==
Doe was born on April 18, 1864, in Gloucester, Massachusetts, to George and Elizabeth (Flynn) Doe. He grew up in Rockport, Massachusetts.

== Baseball career ==
=== Early baseball career ===
Doe began his long minor league career in 1886, with the Newburyport Clamdiggers of the New England League. He also played with Haverhill in 1886 and 1887. Doe was also the occasional player-manager of both Newburyport and Haverhill.

=== Major League Baseball ===
On August 23, 1890, Doe started a game for the Buffalo Bisons of the Players' League. He allowed 10 hits, eight earned runs, seven base on balls, and struck out two Boston Reds hitters over 6.0 innings. Boston won the game 10–0.

One week later, on August 30, Doe pitched for the Pittsburgh Burghers in a game against the Boston Reds. He relieved John Tener in the sixth innings, after Tenner allowed 14 runs. Doe pitched 4.0 innings for Pittsburgh, and allowed four hits and two earned runs, while collecting two strikeouts. The Burghers lost the game 16–4. The Players' League would fold after the season, and Doe would not play in the major leagues again.

=== Return to the New England League ===
After his brief major league stint, Doe would play and manage several New England Leagues teams from 1892 to 1902. He played for the Brockton Shoemakers in 1892 and 1893, and the Haverill club in 1894. In 1895, he started the New Bedford Whalers, acting as a manager, pitcher, and outfielder. After New Bedford folded after 1896, he formed the Fall River Indians club. Doe would soon return to New Bedford in 1898, forming a new Whalers club. The New England League would fold temporarily in mid-1898.

In 1900, Doe managed and played in the outfield the Norwich Witches of the Connecticut League. Norwich won the league pennant, Doe's only championship as a manager.

Doe returned to the New England League in 1900, managing Dover. He returned to Brockton in 1903, but the club moved to New Bedford mid-way through the season. Doe stayed in New Bedford as club manager until 1905. In 1906, he purchased the Worcester Busters, New England League team managed by future Baseball Hall of Famer Jesse Burkett.

He would later control the Providence Grays of the Eastern League. Providence was the only New England team to allow baseball to be played on Sunday. Doe would become a driving force in the movement to allow baseball to be played state-wide in the late 1928.

Doe died on October 4, 1938, in Quincy, Massachusetts, and is buried in Oak Grove Cemetery in Gloucester.

== Personal life ==
While living in New Bedford, Massachusetts, he met his wife, Mary Bryant. They had one child, a daughter.
