= Red Torphy =

American baseball player (1891-1980)

- First baseman
- Born: November 6, 1891; Fall River, Massachusetts, U.S.
- Died: February 11, 1980 (aged 88); Fall River, Massachusetts, U.S.
- Batted: Right Threw: Right

MLB debut
- September 25, 1920, for the Boston Braves

Last MLB appearance
- October 3, 1920, for the Boston Braves

MLB statistics
- Batting average: .200
- Home runs: 0
- Runs batted in: 2
- Stats at Baseball Reference

Teams
- Boston Braves (1920)

Walter Anthony "Red" Torphy (November 6, 1891 – February 11, 1980) was an American professional baseball player. He appeared in three games in Major League Baseball at first base for the 1920 Boston Braves.

Torphy had an extensive career in minor league baseball, playing seventeen seasons. His professional career began in 1913 with the Worcester Busters of the New England League, and ended in 1929 with the Brockton Shoemakers in the same league.

Torphy was born in Fall River, Massachusetts, and died there in 1980.
