= Jack Burns (first baseman) =

American baseball player (1907–1975)

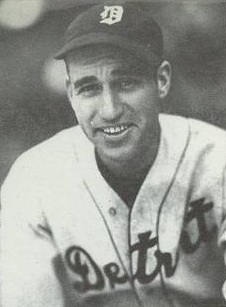
- First baseman
- Born: August 31, 1907; Cambridge, Massachusetts, U.S.
- Died: April 18, 1975 (aged 67); Brighton, Massachusetts, U.S.
- Batted: Left Threw: Left

MLB debut
- September 17, 1930, for the St. Louis Browns

Last MLB appearance
- September 27, 1936, for the Detroit Tigers

MLB statistics
- Batting average: .280
- Home runs: 44
- Runs batted in: 417
- Stats at Baseball Reference

Teams
- St. Louis Browns (1930–1936); Detroit Tigers (1936)

John Irving Burns (August 31, 1907 – April 18, 1975), nicknamed "Slug", was an American first baseman, coach and scout in Major League Baseball who played for the St. Louis Browns and Detroit Tigers from 1930 to 1936. A native of Cambridge, Massachusetts, Burns stood 6 feet (1.8 m) tall and weighed 175 pounds (79 kg) in his playing days and batted and threw left-handed.

== Playing career ==
Known as "Slug", or "Slugger" on the Cambridge sandlots, Burns initially pursued factory work after high school, and played for his employer's baseball team. In 1927, he played for the Chatham-Harwich club in the Cape Cod Baseball League, where he was described as "the hardest hitting first baseman in the league."

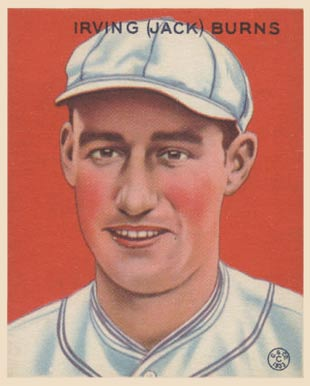
Burns' 1933 Goudey baseball card

Burns's professional playing career began in 1928 for the Brockton Shoemakers of the New England League. After leading the Class A Western League in home runs with 36 in 1929, his contract was purchased by the St. Louis Browns of the American League. After a brief MLB trial in 1930, Burns became the starting first baseman for the Browns in 1931. He handled those duties until he was traded to the Detroit Tigers on April 30, 1936, for pitcher Elon Hogsett. He returned to the minor leagues at the end of that campaign for the remainder of his playing career. In Burns's finest season for the Browns, 1932, he scored 111 runs, batted .305, hit 11 homers and drove home 70 runs batted in (RBIs). Over his big league career (1930–36), he appeared in 890 games, and batted .280 with 980 hits, 44 homers and 417 RBIs. His career fielding percentage was .992. He led American League first basemen in assists in 1931 and 1932.

== Coaching and scouting career ==
Burns became a player-manager in the minor leagues with the 1938 Toronto Maple Leafs of the International League, replacing Dan Howley on June 27 with the Leafs in eighth place. He rallied the team to a fifth place standing that year, but when Toronto finished last in 1939, Burns was released. He briefly continued his playing career in 1940, appearing in 100 games for the San Francisco Seals of the Pacific Coast League, then spent one year, 1942, in the Boston Braves' organization as playing skipper of their Bradford Bees affiliate in the Class D Pennsylvania–Ontario–New York League (PONY League). After World War II, Burns managed the unaffiliated Fall River Indians of the Class B New England League in 1946. Then, he joined the Boston Red Sox as a scout in 1947 to 1948 before moving into their farm system as skipper of the Bosox' Eastern League affiliates in Scranton and Albany from 1949 to 1954. His 1952 Albany Senators won the league pennant, while his 1954 Senators were the EL playoff champions.

Burns then spent five seasons (1955–59) as a Red Sox coach, working primarily as the third-base coach under manager Pinky Higgins. He scouted for Boston from 1960 until his death, at Brighton, Massachusetts, at the age of 67. As a New England–based Red Sox scout, he is credited with recommending and signing Baseball Hall of Fame catcher Carlton Fisk, a first-round selection in the January 1967 draft.

== Personal ==
His son Bob Burns was a baseball coach at Kennett High School, North Conway, New Hampshire, from 1971 to 2012. Each year, the school presents the Jack Burns Baseball Award.

Preceded by Buster Mills	Boston Red Sox third base coach 1955–1959	Succeeded by Billy Herman
