= Jim Korwan =

American baseball player (1874–1899)

- Pitcher
- Born: March 4, 1874; Brooklyn, New York, US
- Died: July 24, 1899 (aged 25); Brooklyn, New York, US
- Batted: Right Threw: Left

MLB debut
- April 24, 1894, for the Brooklyn Grooms

Last MLB appearance
- July 17, 1897, for the Chicago Colts

MLB statistics
- Win–loss record: 1–2
- Earned run average: 6.92
- Strikeouts: 14
- Stats at Baseball Reference

Teams
- Brooklyn Grooms (1894); Chicago Colts (1897)

James Korwan (March 4, 1874 – July 24, 1899) was a 19th-century American Major League Baseball pitcher. He played in one game for the Brooklyn Grooms during the 1894 season and in five games for the Chicago Colts during the 1897 season.

== See also ==
- List of baseball players who died during their careers
