= Ernie Ross (baseball) =

Canadian baseball player (1880-1950)

- Pitcher
- Born: March 31, 1880; Toronto, Ontario
- Died: March 28, 1950 (aged 69); Toronto, Ontario
- Batted: Left Threw: Left

MLB debut
- September 17, 1902, for the Baltimore Orioles

Last MLB appearance
- September 22, 1902, for the Baltimore Orioles

MLB statistics
- Win–loss record: 1-1
- Earned run average: 7.41
- Strikeouts: 2
- Stats at Baseball Reference

Teams
- Baltimore Orioles (1902)

Ernest Bertram "Curly" Ross (March 31, 1880 – March 28, 1950) was a Major League Baseball pitcher. Ross played for the Baltimore Orioles in 1902. In two career games, he had a 1–1 record with a 7.41 ERA. He batted and threw left-handed.

Ross was born and died in Toronto.
