= Marty O'Toole =

American baseball player (1888–1949)

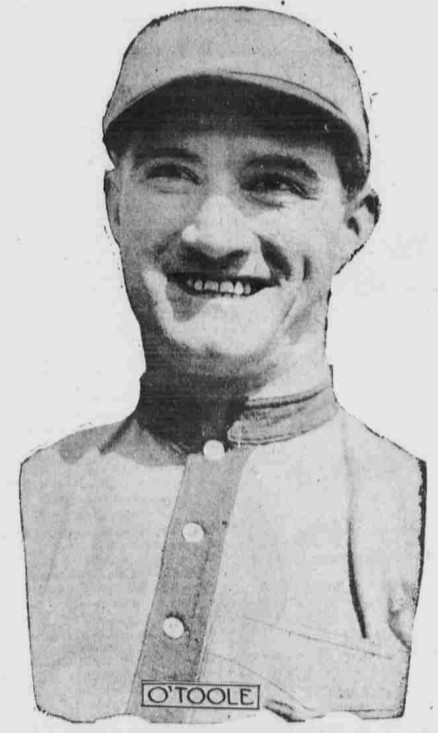
- Pitcher
- Born: November 27, 1888; William Penn, Pennsylvania, U.S.
- Died: February 18, 1949 (aged 60); Aberdeen, Washington, U.S.
- Batted: Right Threw: Right

MLB debut
- September 18, 1908, for the Cincinnati Reds

Last MLB appearance
- October 6, 1914, for the New York Giants

MLB statistics
- Win–loss record: 27-36
- Earned run average: 3.21
- Strikeouts: 296
- Stats at Baseball Reference

Teams
- Cincinnati Reds (1908); Pittsburgh Pirates (1911–1914); New York Giants (1914)

Career highlights and awards
- Tied for National League lead in shutouts: 6 (1912)

Martin James O'Toole (November 27, 1888 – February 18, 1949) was an American pitcher in Major League Baseball. He played a total of five seasons for three teams from 1908 to 1914. He pitched and batted right-handed.

== Career ==
Martin was born to Michael and Mary O'Toole, both Irish immigrants. When he and his siblings were still very young, his parents moved to Framingham, Massachusetts. He made his professional debut on September 21, 1908 near the end of the season for the Cincinnati Reds. He pitched three games for a 1-0 win-loss record and a 2.40 earned run average. He did not play from 1909 to 1910 but reappeared in 1911 for the Pittsburgh Pirates. He pitched in five games for a 3-2 record, 2.37 earned run average, and 34 strikeouts in 38 innings pitched. It would be his only season where he had a positive win-loss record. In 1912 for the Pittsburgh Pirates, he pitched the most games of his career. He pitched 37 games for a 15-17 record, 2.71 earned run average, and 150 strikeouts in 275 1/3 innings pitched. He led the league with 159 walks. That year, he also tied the National League lead in shutouts with six. He shared the lead with Nap Rucker of the Brooklyn Trolley Dodgers. These six shutouts were the only ones that O'Toole pitched in his career.

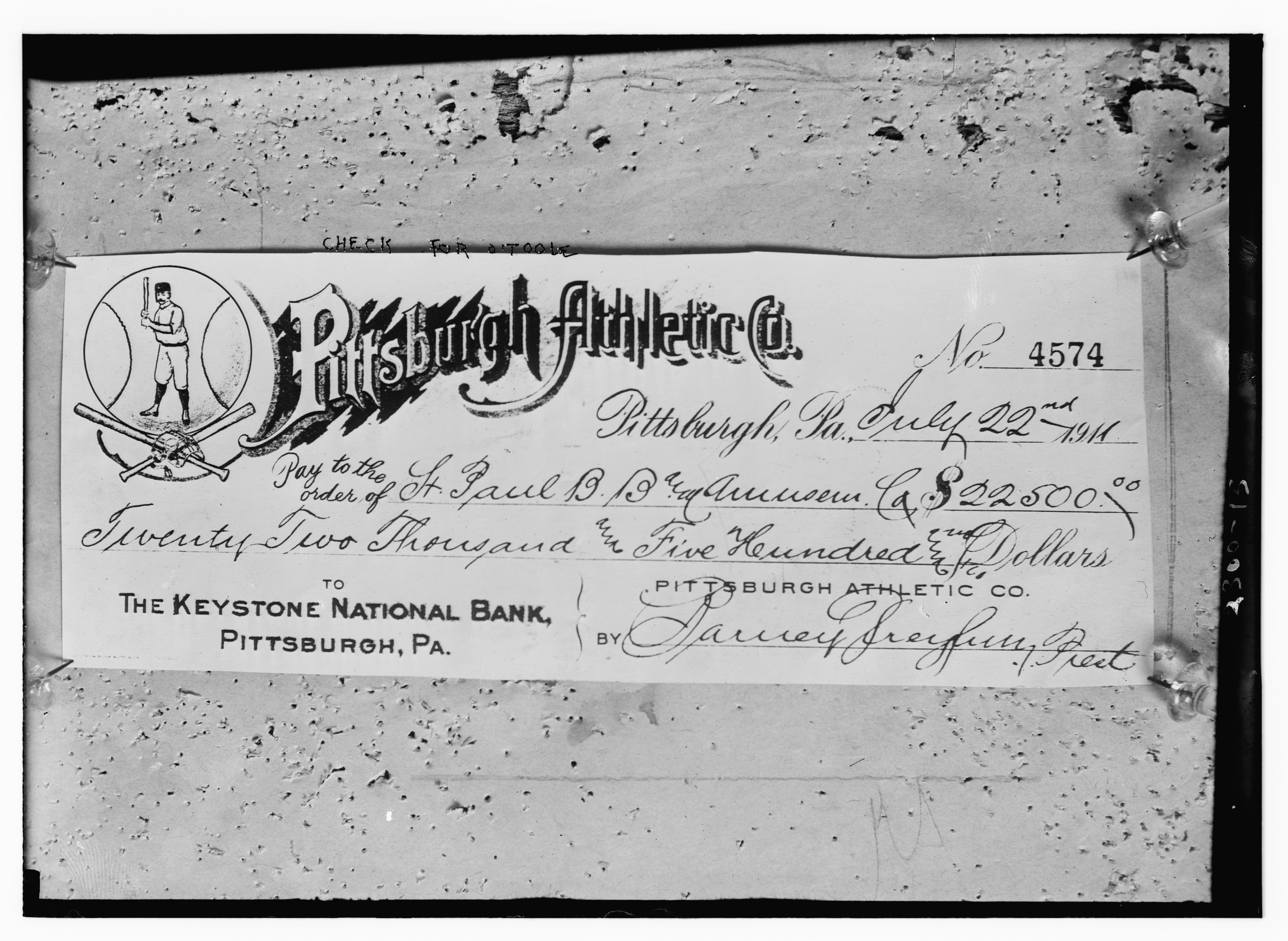
1911 check for O'Toole's contract

He never equaled the statistics he pitched in 1912. In 1913 for the Pittsburgh Pirates, he pitched 28 games, 144 2/3 innings pitches, 3.30 earned run average, and a record of 6-8. His 1914 season for the Pittsburgh Pirates proved troublesome, as he accumulated a 1-8 record with a 4.68 earned run average. He was traded during the season to the New York Giants, where he had a record of 1-1. He finished the 1914 season with a cumulative record of 2-9 and a 4.56 earned run average. He retired at the end of the 1914 season with career total of a 27-35 record, 3.21 earned run average, 100 games pitched, 599 1/3 innings pitched, 31 complete games, and 296 strikeouts. His career batting statistics included a .204 batting average in 211 at bats.

== See also ==
- List of Major League Baseball annual shutout leaders
