= Andy Dunning =

American baseball player (1871–1952)

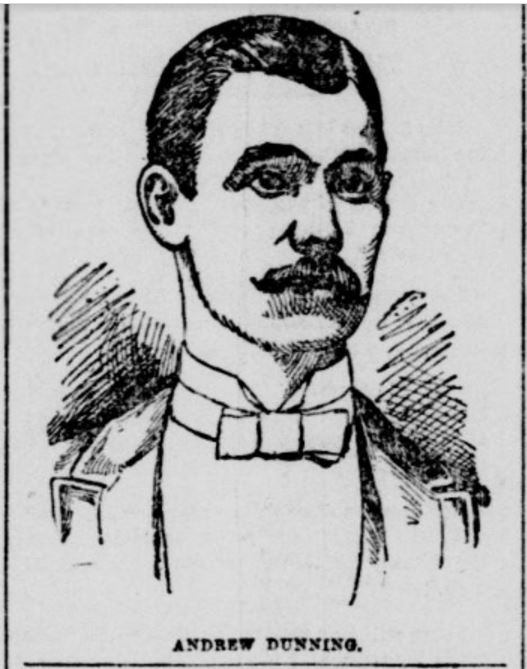
- Pitcher
- Born: August 12, 1871; New York City, U.S.
- Died: June 21, 1952 (aged 80); New York City, U.S.
- Batted: Right Threw: Right

MLB debut
- May 23, 1889, for the Pittsburgh Alleghenys

Last MLB appearance
- July 28, 1891, for the New York Giants

MLB statistics
- Win–loss record: 0-3
- Earned run average: 6.75
- Strikeouts: 4
- Stats at Baseball Reference

Teams
- Pittsburgh Alleghenys (1889); New York Giants (1891)

Andrew Jackson Dunning (August 12, 1871 – June 21, 1952) was an American professional baseball player.

Andy Dunning made his first major league appearance in 1889 pitching for the Pittsburgh Alleghenys. He was 17-years-old at the time of his major league debut.
