= Curt Bernard =

American baseball player (1878–1955)

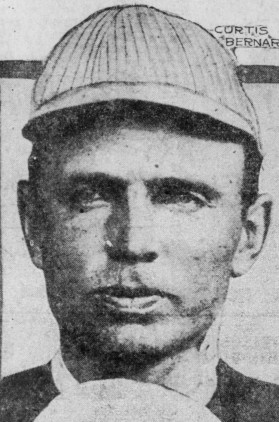
- Outfielder
- Born: February 18, 1878; Parkersburg, West Virginia, U.S.
- Died: April 10, 1955 (aged 77); Culver City, California, U.S.
- Batted: Left Threw: Right

MLB debut
- September 17, 1900, for the New York Giants

Last MLB appearance
- June 24, 1901, for the New York Giants

MLB statistics
- Batting average: .238
- Home runs: 0
- Runs batted in: 14
- Stats at Baseball Reference

Teams
- New York Giants (1900–1901)

Curtis Henry Bernard (February 18, 1878 – April 10, 1955) was an American outfielder in Major League Baseball. He played for the New York Giants of the National League in 1900–1901.
