= Henry Lynch (baseball) =

American baseball player (1866–1925)

- Right fielder
- Born: April 8, 1866; Worcester, Massachusetts, U.S.
- Died: November 23, 1925 (aged 59); Worcester, Massachusetts, U.S.
- Batted: Both Threw: Unknown

MLB debut
- September 21, 1893, for the Chicago Colts

Last MLB appearance
- September 25, 1893, for the Chicago Colts

MLB statistics
- Batting average: .214
- Home runs: 0
- Runs batted in: 2
- Stats at Baseball Reference

Teams
- Chicago Colts (1893)

Henry W. Lynch (April 8, 1866 – November 23, 1925) was an American professional baseball player. He played part of one season in Major League Baseball, appearing in four games for the Chicago Colts in 1893 as a right fielder.

== Bibliography ==
- Career statistics from Baseball Reference · Baseball Reference (Minors) · Retrosheet · Baseball Almanac
