= Henry Lampe (baseball) =

American baseball player (1872–1936)

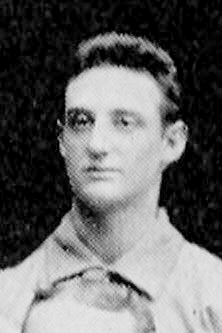
- Pitcher
- Born: September 19, 1872; Boston, Massachusetts, U.S.
- Died: September 16, 1936 (aged 63); Dorchester, Massachusetts, U.S.
- Batted: Right Threw: Left

MLB debut
- May 14, 1894, for the Boston Beaneaters

Last MLB appearance
- August 2, 1895, for the Philadelphia Phillies

MLB statistics
- Win–loss record: 0–3
- Earned run average: 8.03
- Strikeouts: 19
- Stats at Baseball Reference

Teams
- Boston Beaneaters (1894); Philadelphia Phillies (1895)

Henry Joseph Lampe (September 19, 1872 – September 16, 1936) was an American pitcher in Major League Baseball. He played for the Boston Beaneaters in 1894 and the Philadelphia Phillies in 1895. He played in the minors through 1899, primarily in the Eastern League.
