= Andy Sullivan (baseball) =

American baseball player (1884-1920)

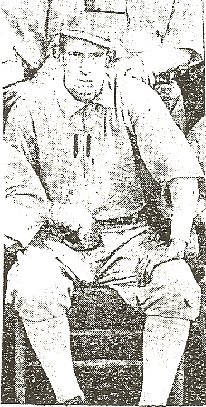
- Shortstop
- Born: August 30, 1884; Southborough, Massachusetts, U.S.
- Died: February 14, 1920 (aged 35); Framingham, Massachusetts, U.S.
- Batted: Unknown Threw: Right

MLB debut
- September 13, 1904, for the Boston Beaneaters

Last MLB appearance
- September 13, 1904, for the Boston Beaneaters

MLB statistics
- Batting average: .000
- Home runs: 0
- Runs batted in: 0
- Stats at Baseball Reference

Teams
- Boston Beaneaters (1904)

Andrew Raymond Sullivan (August 30, 1884 – February 14, 1920) was an American Major League Baseball shortstop. He attended Fordham University.

== Sources ==
- Career statistics from Baseball Reference · Baseball Reference (Minors) · Retrosheet · Baseball Almanac
