= Simmy Murch =

American baseball player (1880–1939)

- Infielder
- Born: November 21, 1880; Castine, Maine, U.S.
- Died: June 6, 1939 (aged 58); Exeter, New Hampshire, U.S.
- Batted: Right Threw: Right

MLB debut
- September 20, 1904, for the St. Louis Cardinals

Last MLB appearance
- May 22, 1908, for the Brooklyn Superbas

MLB statistics
- Games played: 23
- Batting average: .141
- Runs batted in: 1
- Stats at Baseball Reference

Teams
- St. Louis Cardinals (1904–1905); Brooklyn Superbas (1908)

Simeon Augustus Murch (November 21, 1880 – June 6, 1939) was an American professional baseball infielder. He played parts of three seasons in Major League Baseball for the St. Louis Cardinals and Brooklyn Superbas. Murch was 6 feet, 2 inches tall and weighed 220 pounds.

== Career ==
Murch was born in Castine, Maine, in 1880. He started his professional baseball career with the New England League's Haverhill Hustlers in 1902. Murch had batting averages of .237 in that year and .288 in the next. In November 1903, he was married to Gertrude McAdams.

Murch then signed with the National League's St. Louis Cardinals before the 1904 season. However, he injured his hand while playing basketball, and he was unable to report to the Cardinals that spring. Murch recovered by April but started the season in the New England League. In July, The Telegraph wrote that he was "the sensation of the league at second base." He batted .245 in 94 games and joined the Cardinals late in the season. In 13 major league games, he batted .137 with 1 run batted in.

In 1905, Murch played four games for St. Louis, batted .111, and returned to the New England League. The following winter, he roller skated and was an official at a Boston rink. Murch then batted .269 for the Manchester Textiles in 1906 and turned an unassisted triple play. In July 1906, Sporting Life wrote that he "comes pretty near being one of the most valuable all-around men in the league." In 1907, he led the league with four home runs. He was purchased by the Brooklyn Superbas in August, and the following year, he received his final shot in the majors. He batted .182 in six games for Brooklyn before returning to the New England League again and batting .227 there.

Murch rebounded in 1909. Playing for the Brockton Tigers, he batted .313 to set a career-high in batting average and also led the league with 144 hits. Murch moved up to the class A American Association in 1910 but batted just .230, and he finished his professional baseball career back in the New England League in 1912.

== Coaching ==
After retiring as a player, Murch coached baseball at Middlebury College in Middlebury, Vermont. He also coached the football team at Middlebury in 1917 and was the school's first men's basketball coach. He then served as an athletic director for the Knights of Columbus, first in Newport News, Virginia, then Newport, Rhode Island. Murch coached baseball at Phillips Exeter Academy in Exeter, New Hampshire from 1923 until his death in 1939. He died on June 6, 1939, at his home in Exeter.

== Head coaching record ==
=== College football ===
Year	Team	Overall	Conference	Standing	Bowl/playoffs
Middlebury (Independent) (1917)
1917	Middlebury	1–5–1			
Middlebury:		1–5–1			
Total:		1–5–1			
