= Bill McGunnigle =

American baseball player and manager (1855–1899)

Bill McGunningle
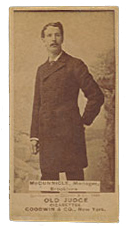
- McGunnigle on an 1887 Old Judge tobacco card
- Outfielder / Pitcher / Manager
- Born: January 1, 1855; Boston, Massachusetts, U.S.
- Died: March 9, 1899 (aged 44); Brockton, Massachusetts, U.S.
- Batted: Right Threw: Right

MLB debut
- May 2, 1879, for the Buffalo Bisons

Last MLB appearance
- August 17, 1882, for the Cleveland Blues

MLB statistics
- Batting average: .173
- Win–loss record: 11–8
- Earned run average: 2.81
- Managerial record: 327–248
- Stats at Baseball Reference

Teams
- As player: Buffalo Bisons (1879–1880); Worcester Worcesters (1880); Cleveland Blues (1882); As manager: Brooklyn Bridegrooms (1888–1890); Pittsburgh Pirates (1891); Louisville Colonels (1896)

Career highlights and awards
- AA pennant (1889); NL pennant (1890)

William Henry McGunnigle (January 1, 1855 – March 9, 1899) was an American baseball manager for the Brooklyn Bridegrooms, Pittsburgh Pirates and Louisville Colonels. He was nicknamed "Gunner" or "Mac" during his playing days.

== McGunnigle the player ==
After moving to East Stoughton as a child, McGunnigle began his career in the Massachusetts League with the Howard Juniors club of nearby Brockton. He went to the Fall River team in 1875, primarily pitching and catching, but also serving as a utility player for the club.

In 1876, he left to play pitcher and catcher for a club in Buffalo which would eventually come to be known as the Bisons, winning the International Association pennant in 1878. The team became a professional club and joined the National League as the Buffalo Bisons in 1879.

McGunnigle had an abbreviated playing record in top professional leagues, tallying 58 games for the Buffalo Bisons (1879–80), Worcester Ruby Legs (1880) and Cleveland Blues (1882). McGunnigle won the Clipper Medal, the equivalent of an all-star selection, as a right fielder for the Bisons in 1879. Over his two years with Buffalo, he compiled an 11–8 record in 18 starts, leading the league with the lowest per-inning rates of hits and strikeouts in 1879 and posting the fourth-best winning percentage. He was briefly the player/manager for the Bisons in 1880, but team management replaced him with infielder Sam Crane after 17 games. As a professional, McGunnigle was a career .173 hitter with a .900 fielding percentage as a part-time outfielder.

McGunnigle was lured in 1883, along with other top Massachusetts players, to the newly formed Northwestern League since there were no high-level minor leagues in New England. He played for the Saginaw Old Golds primarily as a pitcher and right fielder in 1883 (where he caught future Hall-of-Famer John Clarkson) and part of 1884 before a midseason transfer to the Bay City Independents.

He returned to the East Coast in 1885 and, as manager/captain, led the Brockton club to the New England League championship. McGunnigle's skull was fractured by pitcher Dick Conway on July 23 of that season, effectively ending his playing career. According to the Brockton Weekly Gazette:

"[McGunnigle] dodged the first ball thrown at his head ... with the second [pitch] he needed to drop to all fours to save himself ... The unfortunate batsman could not avoid the [third] ball in time, and it struck him directly behind the left ear which caused a crash that was heard in every part of the grounds. Poor 'Mac' fell like an animal beneath the butcher's axe, and his quivering form was drawn up in agony as he lay upon the ground."

The rules of organized baseball had recently been changed to allow overhand pitching, and at the time, the pitching rubber was only 50 feet from home plate (much closer than the modern standard of 60 feet, 6 inches). The Boston Globe, in writing about the incident, said "The only topic on the street tonight is the question of whether it was Conway's idea to frighten the batsman or if he was trying to get the balls as close to the batsman as possible"

After another year in Brockton, he moved to manage and captain the Lowell Browns, winning the 1887 pennant.

== A successful manager in the bigs ==
McGunnigle took over as manager of the Brooklyn Bridegrooms in 1888, after the club had finished sixth in the American Association the previous year under owner/manager Charlie Byrne. McGunnigle guided the team to a second-place finish that year, four games behind perennial league champ St. Louis.

The next season, McGunnigle's boys edged the Browns for the American Association pennant. Facing the New York Giants of the rival National League in the 1889 World Series, the Bridegrooms were outscored by more than 20 runs and bowed, 6–3, in the exhibition.

Pennants won
as a manager
Club	Lg	Year
Brockton *	NE	1885
Lowell Browns *	IA	1887
Brooklyn Bridegrooms	AA	1889
Brooklyn Bridegrooms	NL	1890
* player/manager

The team was admitted to the National League the following year, and McGunnigle again led the team to a pennant, helping the Bridegrooms become the first team in any professional sports league to win two championships in consecutive years. Despite back-to-back pennant runs (and tying the 1890 World Series 3–3–1), McGunnigle was let go after the season and replaced by John Montgomery Ward.

After the 1891 Pittsburgh Pirates got off to a 31–47 start on the heels of a 23–113 season, the club demoted captain/manager Ned Hanlon and hired McGunnigle. (Relatedly, Hanlon would later be a successful manager for the Brooklyn club at the turn of the century.) McGunnigle managed the Pittsburgh club to a modest 24–33 record over the remainder of the year. He was not brought back for the following season.

During 1891, McGunnigle also managed the Providence team in the amateur Eastern League, playing in the first Sunday organized baseball game ever played in New England on August 9, 1891, in Rhode Island. At the time, custom and law forbade Sunday baseball, but it was allowed by officials in Warwick, Rhode Island for games at the Rocky Point Resort.

When the New England League was re-formed in 1892, McGunnigle again became the player/manager of the Brockton club. He joined the team at midseason, immediately spurring Brockton on a 12-game winning streak and vaulting the team into first place. However, the club could not retain their spot in the standings. He helped Fred Doe organize the first professional baseball game to ever be played on a Sunday in New England. The Brockton club won the game at Rocky Point Resort, 7–6, over Woonsocket on July 10, 1892. The game eventually led to a change of Massachusetts law, which forbade Sunday baseball, in 1928. McGunnigle returned to Lowell in 1893, and spent 1894 and 1895 involved in the game of polo.

In 1896, the NL's Louisville Colonels started 2–17 under manager John McCloskey, who was subsequently let go. McGunnigle came on board and managed the Colonels to a 36–76 record the rest of the way, finishing last in the league, two games behind St. Louis. McGunnigle was not asked to manage the team further, being "roughly handled" in his dismissal, according to the Brockton Times. His career professional managerial record in 586 games with Brooklyn, Pittsburgh, and Louisville was 327–248 (.569).

An automobile struck a carriage carrying McGunnigle and other men in an 1897 accident, throwing them out of the vehicle. McGunnigle was chronically ill thereafter, and homeridden for the last months of his life. He died at age 44 and is buried at St. Patrick's Cemetery in Brockton.

== Trivia ==
- Some local sources indicate that McGunnigle once wore a pair of bricklayer's gloves in a game against Harvard in 1875, becoming the first catcher to wear a glove in a baseball game.
- As a manager, McGunnigle employed a tin whistle to signal his players.
- McGunnigle has the best winning percentage in the history of the Dodgers franchise among those who managed at least one full season.
- Led the 1889/1890 Brooklyn Bridegrooms to back-to-back pennants in different leagues, becoming the first of three professional American sports franchises to do so. (The 1948/1949 Minneapolis Lakers of the NBL and BAA (now the NBA) and the 1949/1950 Cleveland Browns of the AAFC and NFL are the other two.)
