= Nick Wise =

American baseball player (1866–1923)

- Catcher / Outfielder
- Born: Nicholas Joseph Weisse; June 15, 1866; Boston, Massachusetts, U.S.
- Died: January 26, 1923 (aged 56); Boston, Massachusetts, U.S.
- Batted: Right Threw: Right

MLB debut
- June 20, 1888, for the Boston Beaneaters

Last MLB appearance
- June 20, 1888, for the Boston Beaneaters

MLB statistics
- Batting average: .000
- Games played: 1
- At bats: 3
- Stats at Baseball Reference

Teams
- Boston Beaneaters (1888)

Nicholas Joseph Wise (originally Weisse; June 15, 1866 – January 26, 1923) was an American professional baseball player. He appeared in one game in Major League Baseball with the Boston Beaneaters of the National League on June 20, 1888. He split the game between catcher and right field, failing to get a hit in three at bats. He also played with various teams in the New England League between 1887 and 1897.

In later life he worked as a ticket seller at Braves Field and Fenway Park. He died in Jamaica Plain, Boston on January 26, 1923.
