= Worcester Busters =

Former American baseball team

The Worcester Busters was an American baseball team which played at Boulevard Park, Worcester, Massachusetts. They played in Class B of the New England League from 1906 and the Eastern League from 1916 to 1921.
