= Lynn Papooses =

- 1926–1930; Lynn, Massachusetts

Minor league affiliations
- Class: Class B (1926–1930)
- League: New England League (1926–1930)

Major league affiliations
- Team: None

Minor league titles
- League titles (2): 1927; 1928
- Wild card berths (1): 1929

Team data
- Name: Lynn Papooses (1926–1930)
- Ballpark: General Electric Athletic Field (1926–1930)

The Lynn Papooses were a minor league baseball team based in Lynn, Massachusetts. The "Papooses" teams played as members of the New England League from 1926 to 1930, winning the 1927 and 1928 league championships and finishing in second place the other three seasons.

The Lynn Papooses hosted minor league home games at the General Electric Athletic Field, which still contains the ballpark today. On June 24, 1927, the ballpark hosted the first night game between two professional baseball teams, when the Papooses hosted the Salem Witches.

== History ==
=== Early minor league teams ===
In the 1877 season, Lynn, Massachusetts first hosted minor league baseball. The Lynn Live Oaks became charter members of the New England Association. Baseball Hall of Fame member Candy Cummings served the Live Oaks as the team's player/manager until June 1877, when Cummings left Lynn the team folded and he was signed by the Cincinnati Red Stockings to complete the 1877 season.

In 1878, the Lynn Live Oaks team continued play, becoming members of the International Association, a structure that included 12 member teams. Baseball Hall of Fame member Bud Fowler played for the 1878 Live Oaks. On May 17, 1878, while playing for Lynn, Bud Fowler became the first Black player in to appear in a game in organized baseball.

In 1887, Lynn played their first season as members of the New England League, beginning a long tenure of Lynn teams playing as members of the league that continued until 1915.

After the New England league folded following the 1915 season, the 1916 Lynn Pipers team of the Eastern League preceded the Lynn Papooses in minor league play. Lynn ended the 1916 season with a record of 66–57, placing fourth in the final league standings. The Lynn franchise did not return to play in the 1917 Eastern League, which folded following the season.

=== 1926 to 1930 - New England League ===
After a decade absence, Lynn returned to minor league play in 1926, when the New England League reformed as a Class B level league with eight teams. The Lynn "Papooses" were a member of the newly formed league, beginning another tenure of a Lynn franchise playing in the league. Lynn joined the Haverhill Hillies, Lawrence Merry Macks, Lewiston Twins, Lowell Highwaymen, Manchester Blue Sox, Nashua Millionaires and Portland Eskimos teams in beginning play for the reformed league on May 11, 1926.

The Lynn Papooses began play in the newly formed league and finished in second place behind the Manchester Bue Sox, who won the 1926 New England League championship. Led by player/manager King Bader, the Lynn Papooses finished the season with a 57–35 record to place second in the final standings, as Lynn finished 5.5 games behind the first place Manchester team. No playoffs were held. Willard Millsap on Lynn led the New England League with 87 runs scored and Shanty Hogan had a league leading 89 RBI. Player/manager, King Bader led New England League pitchers with a 2.64 ERA.

Tom Whelan became the Lynn manager in 1927, beginning a four-year tenure as the manager of the Papooses. In 1925, Whelan had managed the semi-professional Lynn General Electric team in the Greater Boston Twilight League. The team played at the newly built baseball field within the General Electric Athletic Park. In 1926, Whelan tried to return to minor league baseball in the spring of 1926 as player-manager of the Lowell Highwaymen of New England League. However, Whelan had to resign after his petition for reinstatement into organized Baseball was denied, reportedly because he used a player in Nashua who was on baseball's "suspended list." In August 1926, Whelan became a coach at Lynn English High School, where he coached the football, basketball, and baseball teams. Whelan was finally reinstated into organized baseball in 1927, perhaps because professional baseball not his primary vocation.

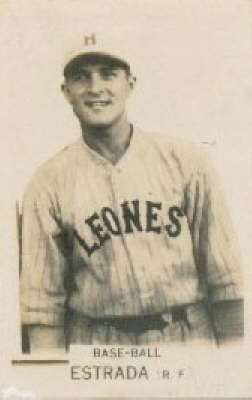
(1927) Oscar Estrada, Cuban baseball card. Estrada pitched for Lynn in both 1926 and 1927.

In the era of segregated baseball, Oscar Estrada, a native of Cuba had played the 1924 and 1925 season for the integrated Cuban Stars (East) in the Eastern Colored League. Estrada joined the Lynn roster and pitched the 1926 and 1927 seasons for the Lynn Papooses.

Shanty Hogan played for Lynn in 1926, after previously playing as an outfielder in the minor leagues for the Worcester Panthers and the Albany Senators. In 1926, playing with the Lynn Papooses, Hogan was converted from an outfielder into a catcher. After his success as a catcher in 1926, Hogan was signed by the Boston Braves for the 1927 season, and began his major league career with a .288 batting average in 299 at bats for the Braves in his rookie season.

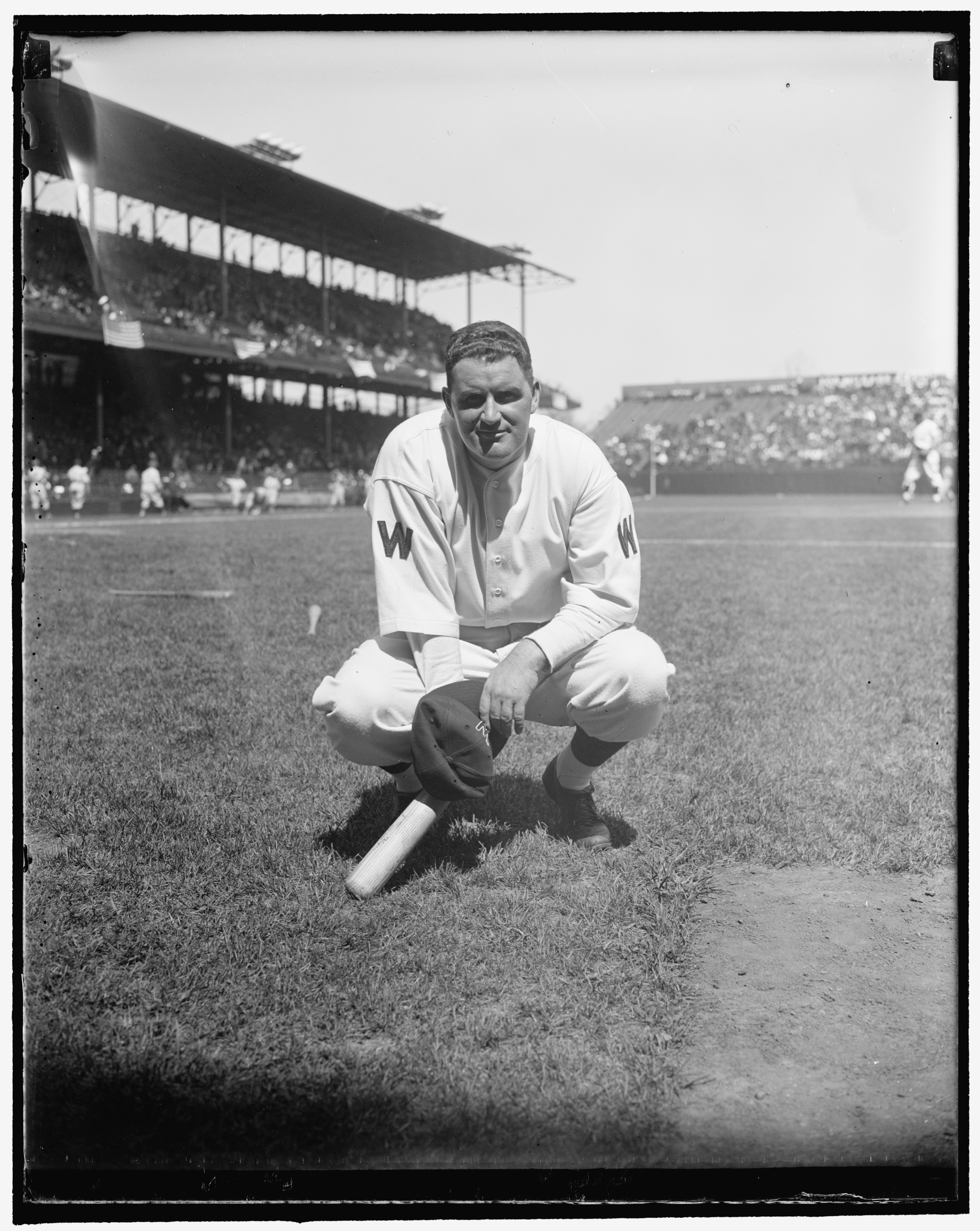
(1937) Shanty Hogan, Washington Senators. Hogan played for Lynn in 1926, where he was turned from an outfielder into a catcher. At his new position, he began his major league career in 1927.

After finishing in second place the previous season, the 1927 Lynn Papooses won the New England League pennant and championship. As the league adopted a playoff format, Lynn ended the regular season in first place with a 59–30 record in the eight-team league. Playing under manager Tom Whelan, Lynn finished 7.5 games ahead of the second place Portland Eskimos. In the playoff, Lynn swept Portland in four games to win the New England League championship. Lynn pitcher Bill Dunlap led the New England League with both 15 wins and a 1.28 ERA on the season. Teammate Frank Shuman tied Dunlap with 15 victories.

The 1928 Lynn Papooses defended their league championship. Lynn was led to a second consecutive championship by manager Tom Whelan. Lynn finished in first place in the regular season New England League standings, capturing the league pennant. The Papooses ended the regular season a 56–44 overall regular season record, finishing 2.0 games ahead of the second place Manchester Blue Sox. Lynn won the second half of the split season schedule after the Attleboro Burros won the first half title. The playoff final was won by Lynn over Attleboro 4 games to 3. Lynn pitcher Leon Chagnon led the New England League with 124 strikeouts.

In 1929, the Papooses advanced to New England League playoff final for the third consecutive season. Lynn placed second in the eight–team New England League regular season, finishing with a record of 81–47. Lynn ended the regular season just 0.5 game behind the first place Manchester Blue Sox (82–47) in the final standings, as Manchester laid claim to the regular season pennant. Lynn was led by manager Tom Whelan. The New England League held a final playoff, with Manchester and Lynn advancing. In the playoff, the Blue Sox defeated Lynn 4 games to 1 and captured the New England League championship. "Double" Joe Dwyer of Lynn led new England League hitters with 192 total hits in 1929.

"Double" Joe Dwyer had played for the 1926 Newark Bears prior to beginning a three-season tenure with Lynn in 1927. Paul Block, the owner Bears, wouldn't pay Dwyer a $300.00 option bonus after he batted .359 for Newark in 1926. Felt he was owed the money, Dwyer wrote a letter to baseball commissioner Judge Kenesaw Mountain Landis, who investigated the situation. After Landis' involvement, Newark eventually sent $302.50 to Dwyer. Dwyer said, "I had a lot of sodas that week." However, he added "it probably ruined me. I was a marked man. The owners ran everything and stuck together. They put me down as a troublemaker." After hitting .358, with his 192 hits in 1929, Dwyer began a six-season tenure with the Wilkes-Barre Barons in 1930. Dwyer later became a major league scout and signed Wilbur Wood, among others.

The Lynn Papooses played their final season in 1930, as the six-team New England League folded during the season. The Lewiston Twins and Nashua Millionaires teams both disbanded on June 16, 1930. After continuing play briefly as a four–team league, the New England League folded on June 22, 1930. On the date the 1930 New England League folded, Lynn ended their season with a record of 19–12 under manager Tom Whelan. The Salem Witches were in first place with a 21–9 record, finishing 2.5 games ahead of the second place Papooses. Lynn's Tom Adams was leading the league with 31 runs scored and Mike Balaski had a league leading 4–0 when the league folded.

The New England League did not return to play in 1931. The New England League reformed and played the 1933 season as a six-team league, but without Lynn as a member. The league then folded after the 1933 season. The New England League returned to play beginning with the 1946 season with a Lynn franchise rejoining the league.

After the Papooses, Lynn next hosted minor league baseball when the 1946 Lynn Red Sox began a tenure of play as members of the reformed New England League.

== The ballpark ==
The Lynn Papooses hosted minor league home games at the General Electric Athletic Field. The ballpark is still in use today for baseball. On June 24, 1927, the first night game between two professional baseball teams was hosted at the ballpark when Lynn played Salem in an exhibition game under the lights at General Electric Field. Night baseball was never adopted for the regular season by the New England League.

In 2024, the ballpark was scheduled to undergo major renovations to improve the playing field and surrounding facilities. Today, G.E. Field is located at 663 Summer Street in Lynn, Massachusetts.

== Timeline ==
| Year(s) | # Yrs. | Team | League | Level | Ballpark |
|---|---|---|---|---|---|
| 1926–1930 | 5 | Lynn Papooses | New England League | Class B | General Electric Athletic Field |

== Year–by–year records ==
| Year | Record | Place | Manager | Playoffs/notes |
|---|---|---|---|---|
| 1926 | 53–42 | 2nd | King Bader | No playoffs held |
| 1927 | 59–30 | 1st | Tom Whelan | Won league pennant League champions |
| 1928 | 56–44 | 1st | Tom Whelan | Won league pennant League champions |
| 1929 | 81–47 | 2nd | Tom Whelan | Lost in final |
| 1930 | 19–12 | 2nd | Tom Whelan | League folded June 22 |

== Notable alumni ==
- King Bader (1926, MGR)
- Leon Chagnon (1928)
- Bill Dunlap (1927–1928)
- Joe Dwyer (1927–1929)
- Oscar Estrada (1926–1927)
- Sid Graves (1926–1927)
- Shanty Hogan (1926)
- Cy Malis (1928)
- Spike Merena (1929)
- Joe Ogrodowski (1926)
- Sam Post (1928–1929)
- Bill Whaley (1929)
- Tom Whelan (1927–1930, MGR)

== See also ==
- Lynn Papooses players
