= Lowell Grays =

- 1912–1919; (1912–1916, 1919, 1926, 1929, 1933–1934, 1947); Lowell, Massachusetts

Minor league affiliations
- Class: Class B (1891–1892, 1901–1911)
- League: New England League (1912–1915, 1919, 1926, 1929, 1933, 1947); Eastern League (1916); Northeastern League (1934)

Major league affiliations
- Team: None

Minor league titles
- League titles (4): 1913; 1919; 1933; 1934.
- Division titles (1): 1934
- Wild card berths (1): 1933

Team data
- Name: Lowell Grays (1912–1916, 1919); Lowell Highwaymen (1926); Lowell Millers (1929); Lowell Lauriers (1933); Lowell Hustlers (1934); Lowell Orphans (1947)
- Ballpark: Spalding Field (1912–1916, 1919)

The Lowell Grays were a minor league baseball team based in Lowell, Massachusetts. From 1912 to 1915, the Lowell "Grays" played as members of the Class B level New England League, winning the 1913 league championship.

The Grays were named after their owner/manager Jim Gray. After the New England league folded following the 1915 season, Lowell played the 1916 season in the Eastern League. Lowell returned to the New England League, for the 1919, 1926, 1929, 1933 and 1947 seasons, with a single season in the 1934 Northeastern League. Lowell won league championships in 1913, 1919, 1933 and 1934.

The Lowell Grays teams were preceded in minor league play by Lowell Tigers who played from 1901 to 1911 in the New England League.

The Lowell teams hosted home minor league games at Spalding Field and Laurier Park.

Baseball Hall of Fame member Jesse Burkett managed Lowell teams in 1916 and 1933 and became the team's owner.

The 1996 Lowell Spinners resumed minor league play as members of the New York-Penn League.

== History ==
=== 1912 to 1919 - Lowell Grays ===
Minor league baseball began in Lowell, Massachusetts in 1877 with a championship team. The Lowell Ladies Men played as members of the newly formed New England League.

After numerous New England League teams followed the 1877 Ladies Men, the Grays were immediately preceded by the 1911 Lowell Tigers. The Tigers won the new England League championship in their final season known as the "Tigers. " The Lowell Tigers had a tenure in the New England league that began in 1901. On June 22, 1910, John Smith had resigned as the Lowell Tiger's general manager and was replaced in that position by team owner James Gray. Despite never managing or playing baseball, Gray later became the manager of the team, leading Lowell to the 1911 New England League championship. In 1910, Gray still co-owned the team with local tavern owner Andrew Roach and James J. Kennedy. In 1911, the Lowell Tigers were led by team owner Jim Gray, in his first season as manager. In 1912, the team began to be referred to as the "Grays" after winning the league championship in 1911.

The Tigers ended the 1911 New England League season with a record of 77–46 and had a first-place finish, playing under new manager Jim Gray. The Tigers finished 2.5 games ahead of the second place Worcester Busters in the eight-team league.

In defending their league championship, the 1912 Lowell team was renamed after their manager Jim Gray and continued New England League known as the Lowell "Grays." The Grays continued New England League play through 1915 when the league folded and then were reformed with the league for the 1919 season.

In 1912, the defending champions continued play in the eight-team, Class B level New England in the 24th season of the league. The Lowell Tigers had played in the league beginning in 1901. The Grays joined the Brockton Shoemakers, Fall River Brinies, Haverhill Hustlers, Lawrence Barristers, Lynn Leonardites, New Bedford Whalers and Worcester Busters teams in continuing league play, which began on April 19, 1912.

The 1912 Lowell Grays finished the New England League season as the league runner up, playing under owner/manager James Gray. The Grays finished the season with a 75–50 record and finished 2.0 games behind the first place Lawrence Barristers in the league standings. The Class B level league had no playoff structure. Lowell's Rube DeGroff hit .348 to win the New England League batting title, while also leading the league with 14 home runs. Lowell pitcher Jeff Pfeffer led the league with a .733 win percentage with his 11-4 record.

The Grays were the champions of the 1913 eight-team New England League, winning their second title in three seasons. James Gray continued as manager in leading the team to become league champions. No playoffs were held. The Lowell Grays ended the season in first place with an 81–45 record playing again under their namesake Jim Gray. The Grays finished 7.0 games behind the second place Portland Duffs in the final standings. Portland was managed by Baseball Hall of Fame member Hugh Duffy and opened a new ballpark in 1913. Lowell finished 9.5 games ahead of the third place Worcester Busters, who were managed by another Baseball Hall of Fame member, Jesse Burkett who would later manage his final team in Lowell. For the second consecutive season, Lowell's Rube DeGroff led the New England League in home runs, hitting 10. Lowell teammate Clem Clemons scored a league leading 104 runs and Jim Magee had 174 total hits. Lowell pitcher Happy Finneran led the league with an .875 win percentage on his 11-2 won-loss record.

In their final season under owner/manager 1914 in his final season as manager. The Grays were unable to defend their league championship, as the Lawrence Barristers won the 1914 New England League championship. The Lowell Grays had a 57–66 record in their final season under manager James Gray to finish in sixth place in the Class B league's final standings. Lowell finished was 27.0 games behind Lawrence in the eight–team league.

The 1915 Lowell Grays finished in 54–55 fourth place managers in the New England League standings. In 1915, Cuke Barrows and Pop Kelchner served as managers of the Lowell Grays, replacing Jim Gray. Barrows had success as a player in 1915. The Grays had a record of 54–55, finishing 18.0 games behind the first place Portland Duffs, managed by Hugh Duffy. Lowell's player/manager Cuke Barrows hit .332 to win the New England League batting title, while also leading the league with 11 home runs. After the 1915 season, the Class D New England League folded.

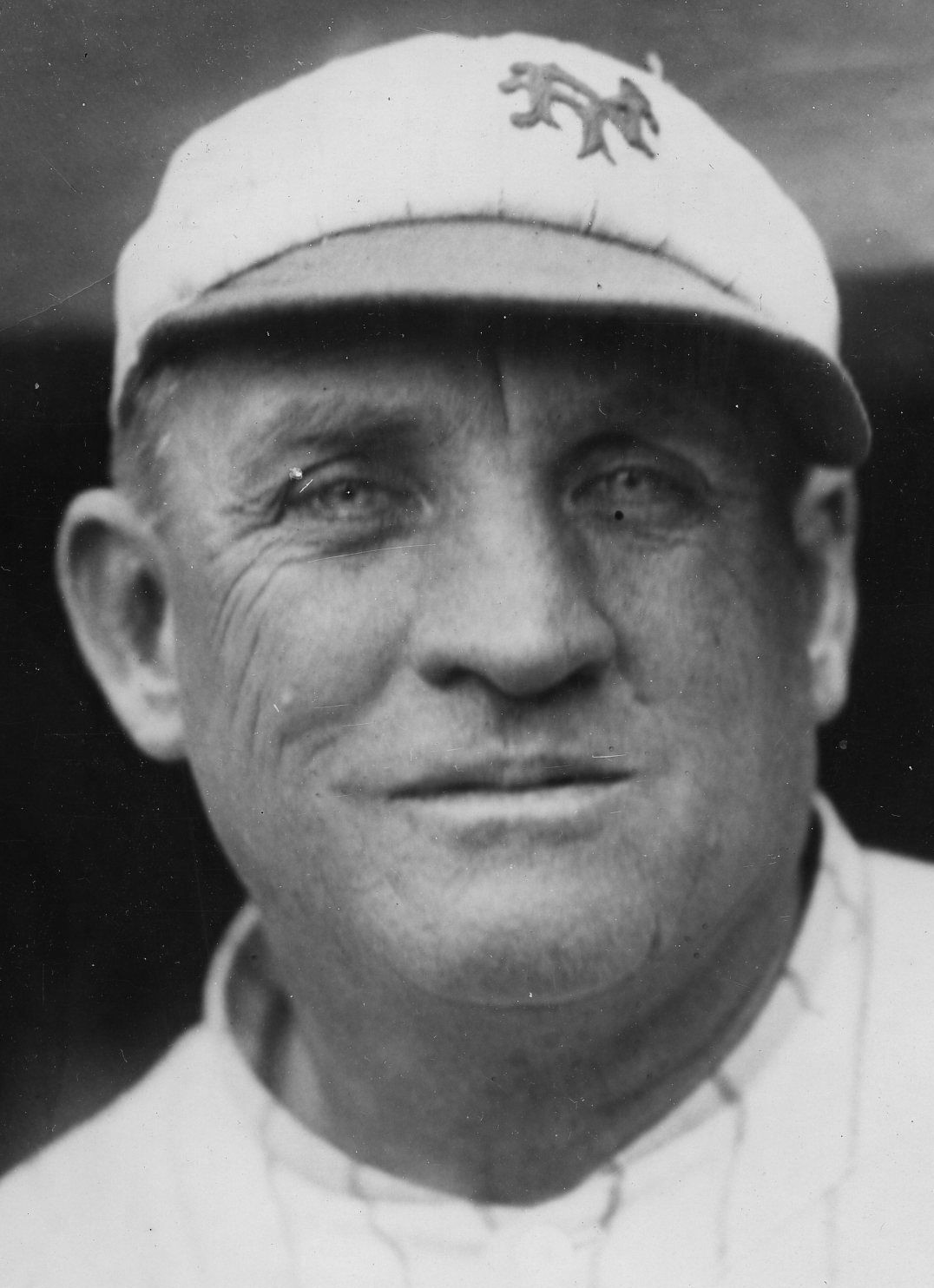
(1920) Baseball Hall of Fame member Jesse Burkett. Burkett managed the 1916 and 1933 Lowell teams and became the team owner.

In 1916, the Grays continued play as members of a newly named league as the New England League changed names. Lowell became members of the eight-team Class B level Eastern League. The Bridgeport Hustlers, Hartford Senators, Lawrence Barristers, New Haven Merlins, New London Planters, Portland Duffs and Worcester Busters teams joined Lowell in beginning league play.

Playing in the Eastern League, the Grays disbanded before the end of the 1916 season in fifth place. The Lowell Grays had a record of 35–59, playing the season under managers Pat Kilhullen, Baseball Hall of Fame member Jesse Burkett and Harry Lord. Lowell ended the season when they folded with Lawrence on September 5, 1916, Lowell did not return to the 1917 Eastern League.

After a three-season hiatus from hosting a minor league team, the Lowell "Grays" rejoined the reformed six-team Class B level New England league in 1919 the begin the season. It was their final season known as the "Grays." Lowell relocated during the season and the league itself folded before completing the season. On July 14, 1919, Lowell had a 24–18 record when the team moved to Lewiston-Auburn, where the team became the Lewiston-Auburn Twins. The New England League folded on August 2O, 1919 with the Twins in first place. After the move, the Grays/Twins ended the season with an overall 38–25 playing the season under manager Mike Hayden. When the league folded, the Twins were 2.0 games ahead of the second place Portland Blue Sox in winning a default championship. Grays/Twins player Harry Bosse was leading the league with 5 home runs when the league folded.

=== 1926 to 1947 - Five seasons - two championships ===
After folding during the 1919 season, the New England League reformed as an eight-team Class B level league in 1926, with Lowell as a member to begin the season. The Lowell "Highwaymen" joined the Haverhill Hillies, Lawrence Merry Macks, Lewiston Twins, Lynn Papooses, Manchester Blue Sox, Nashua Millionaires and Portland Eskimos teams in beginning league play on May 11, 1926.

The Lowell membership in the reformed New England League was brief, lasting 14 games. On June 3, 1926, the Lowell Highwaymen with a record of 6–8 moved to Salem, Massachusetts, where the team became the Salem Witches. Prior to the season, Lowell had hired Tom Whelan as manager, but he was suspended and National Association refused to reinstate him. Whalen had played a player who was on the suspended list while playing and managing a Nashua semi-professional team in 1925.

After compiling a record of 38–39 while based in Salem, the team ended the season with an overall record of 44–47. Lowell/Salem finished the season sixth place managers, playing the season under managers Chick Keating and Tom DeNoville. The Manchester Blue Sox won the championship and ended the New England League season 12.0 games ahead of the Lowell/Salem team.

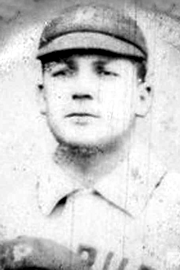
(1897) Bill Merritt. Merritt purchased the 1929 Lowell franchise from Salem.

As the New England League continued play, the Lowell "Millers" rejoined the 1929 eight-team Class B level league. The Millers' membership in the league was again brief. After beginning the season as members, Lowell relocated on June 19, 1929, to become the Nashua Millionaires. The Millers had a record of 13-22 at the time of the move. After a 28–47 record in Nashua, the team ended the season with an overall record of 41–69. The Lowell/Nashua team ended the season in seventh place and were managed by Bill Merritt and Tom DeNoville. A Lowell native, Merritt had purchased the New England League Salem Witches franchise and moved the team to Lowell to begin the 1929 season. After beginning the season in Lowell, poor attendance and financial issues forced Merritt to sell the team to Nashua owners. The Manchester Blue Sox won the league championship and were 31.5 games ahead of the Millers/Millionaires, who finished ahead of the eighth place Gloucester Hillies.

Baseball Hall of Fame member Jesse Burkett managed Lowell in 1933 in his final season in uniform. On September 16, 1933, owner A.F. Roach gave the franchise to Jesse Burkett.

After a four-season hiatus from minor league play, the 1933 Lowell "Lauriers" returned to the reformed six-team Class B level New England League and won a championship aided by weather and a hall of fame manager/owner. The Lawrence Weavers, New Bedford Whalers, Quincy Shipbuilders, Taunton Blues and Worcester Chiefs teams joined with Lowell in beginning league play on May 17, 1933.

In 1933 the Lauriers ended the overall record of 49–40 and were the runner up in the six-team league to end the season. Rusty Yarnall began the season as manager, replaced by Jesse Burkett. The New England played the season with a split-season schedule. Worcester won the first half title of the split-season schedule and New Bedford the second half title, and the two teams were scheduled to meet in the finals. However, the New Bedford Whalers players refused to play in the playoff series. With their second-place finish, Lowell was put into the final in place of New Bedford. In the finals the series between Lowell and Worcester was tied at one game each when the finals were cancelled on September 17, 1933 after repeated weather delays. Lowell and Worcester were declared co-champions after the weather related issued halted the finals. Amit Savard of Lowell hit a league leading 24 home runs and teammate Leon Ballard scored 99 runs to lead the league. Lowell pitcher Frank Milliken led the league pitchers with both 20 wins and 118 strikeouts. The New England League changed names after the 1933 season, before reforming in 1946.

In 1934, the Lowell "Hustlers" continued minor league play as members of the newly named eight-team Class B level Northeastern League and won their second consecutive league championship. The Cambridge Cantabs, Hartford Senators, Manchester Indians, New Bedford Whalers, Springfield Ponies, Watertown Townies and Worcester Rosebuds teams joined the Lowell Hustlers in league beginning play.

The 1934 Northeastern League played a split season schedule. The Hustlers ended the season with a 63–46 overall record and were in second place, 2.0 games behind Worcester. Playing the season under manager Bill Hunnefield, the team was also known as the "Honeys" in reference to their manager. Lowell won the first half season pennant while Worcester won the second half title. In the Playoff, Lowell won the championship in defeating Worcester 4 games to 1. The league folded after the season. Amit Savard of Lowell led the Northeastern League with 17 home runs. Lowell was unable to defend their championship as the Northeastern League did not return to play in 1935, folding after one season of play.

In 1947, the New England League reformed. After over a decade without a minor league team, Lowell gained a team during the New England League during the season and Lowell returned to play at Stoklosa Alumni Field. On July 15, 1947, the Lawrence Millionaires, with a record of 29–38, moved to Lowell and the team finished the season known as the Lowell "Orphans."

On Jul 29, 1947, Lowell First baseman Bob Riordan hit two runs in the contest, but the Lowell Orphans lost 13-5 to the Lynn Red Sox.

The combined team finished in Last place with an overall record of 40–84, playing the season under manager George Kissell. The Orphans had an 11–46 record while based in Lowell. Placing eighth and last in the New England League regular season standings, the Orphans finished 46.0 games behind the first place Lynn Red Sox. Lowell did not return to the 1948 New England League, replaced by the Springfield Cubs franchise in the eight-team league.

Lowell next hosted minor league baseball in 1996, when the Lowell Spinners began play at Stoklosa Alumni Field as members of the New York-Penn League. The Spinners moved into the newly rebuilt Edward A. LeLacheur Park in 1998.

== The ballparks ==
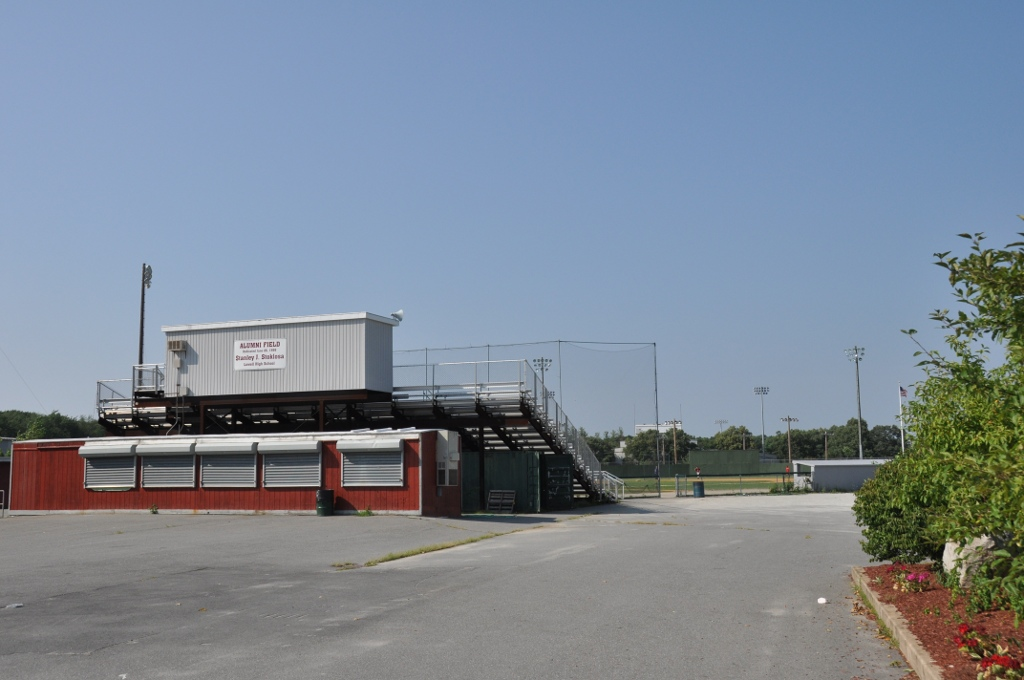
(2012) Stoklosa Alumni Field, Lowell, Massachusetts. The site was formerly the site of Spalding Park, which hosted the Lowell Tigers and Lowell Grays from 1901 to 1919.

Beginning in 1902, The Lowell Tigers hosted minor league home games at the newly built Spalding Park. Lowell teams played at the park through 1929 and again in 1947. In 1901, Lowell Tigers team owner Fred Lake purchased the property, located at the Atherton Grounds in the village of Tewksbury (which was annexed into Lowell in 1905). The ballpark was built and completed for the 1902 season and featured a covered grandstand. The ballpark was named Spalding Park after baseball pioneer A.G. Spalding, who had played games in Lowell for the Boston Red Stockings and Chicago White Stockings in the 1870s. Spalding sent Lake some free baseballs for the team upon learning of the ballpark being his namesake. The ballpark opened on May 1, 1902. When the Tigers moved back to Spalding Park in 1910 following their three seasons at Washington Park, the ballpark needed repairs from fire damage before fans could return. The ballpark was called Spalding Park through 1919. Today, the ballpark site is still in use, known as Stoklosa Alumni Field and serves as home to Lowell High School sports teams.

In the 1933 and 1934 seasons Lowell played home games at Laurier Park. The ballpark was built for $50,000, and had dimensions of (Left, Center, Right): 297-310-275. The ballpark opened May 17, 1933. The site today is on the campus of University of Massachusetts Lowell along the Merrimack River and is called Edward A. LeLacheur Park. On June 8, 1934, the ballpark hosted its first night game with portable lights.

== Timeline ==
Year(s)	# Yrs.	Team	Level	League	Ballpark
1912-1915	4	Lowell Grays	Class B	New England League	Spalding Field
1916	1	Lowell Grays	Class B	Eastern League	Spalding Field
1919	1	Lowell Grays	Class B	New England League	Spalding Field
1926	1	Lowell Highwaymen	Class B	New England League	Spalding Field
1929	1	Lowell Millers	Class B	New England League	Spalding Field
1933	1	Lowell Lauriers	Class B	New England League	Laurier Park
1934	1	Lowell Hustlers	Class B	Northeastern League	Laurier Park
1947	1	Lowell Orphans	Class B	New England League	Spalding Field

== Year–by–year records ==
Year	Record	Place	Manager	Playoffs/notes
1912	75–50	2nd	James Gray	No playoffs held
1913	81–45	1st	James Gray	League champions No playoffs held
1914	57–66	6th	James Gray	No playoffs held
1915	54–55	4th	Cuke Barrows / Pop Kelchner	No playoffs held
1916	35–59	NA	Pat Kilhullen / Jesse Burkett / Harry Lord	Team folded September 5
1919	38–25	1st	Mike Hayden	League champions Lowell (24–18) moved to Lewiston-Auburn July 14; League folded August 2
1926	44–47	6th	Chick Keating / Tom DeNoville	Lowell (6–8) moved to Salem June 3.
1929	41–69	7th	Bill Merritt / Tom DeNoville	Lowell (13-22) moved to Nashua June 19.
1933	49–40	2nd	Rusty Yarnall / Jesse Burkett	League co-champions Playoffs cancelled tied 1-1.
1934	63–46	2nd	Bill Hunnefield	League co-champions Playoff:Lowell 4 games, Worcester 1
1947	40–84	8th	George Kissell	Lawrence (29–38) moved to Lowell July 15

== Notable alumni ==
- Jesse Burkett (1916, 1933, MGR) Inducted Baseball Hall of Fame, 1946.
- Chub Aubrey (1913)
- Cuke Barrows (1915, MGR)
- Jake Boultes (1910–1911)
- Benny Bowcock (1912, 1915)
- Joseph Burns (1913)
- Bill Cooney (1912)
- Crash Davis (1947)
- Tom Daly (1913)
- Shorty Dee (1914–1916)
- Rube DeGroff (1912–1914)
- Tom Downey (1916)
- Joe Dwyer (1926)
- Howard Fahey (1914–1915)
- Happy Finneran (1913)
- Ty Helfrich (1916)
- Ed Henderson (1913)
- Joe Houser (1915)
- Bill Hunnefield (1934, MGR)
- Chick Keating (1926, MGR)
- Pop Kelchner (1915, MGR)
- Pat Kilhullen (1916)
- George Kissell (1947, MGR)
- Art LaVigne (1912–1913)
- Walter Lonergan (1912)
- Harry Lord (1916. MGR)
- Ed MacGamwell (1912)
- Jeff McCleskey (1914–1915)
- Bill Merritt (1929, MGR)
- Ed Miller (1912–1913)
- Allie Moulton (1915)
- Pat Parker (1915–1916)
- Earl Potteiger (1910–1911)
- Jimmy Ring (1914)
- Pop Rising (1912)
- Red Torphy (1916)
- Mellie Wolfgang (1912)
- Rusty Yarnall (1929; 1933, MGR)
- Ducky Yount (1912)
- Matt Zeiser (1912–1916)
- Lowell Grays players
- Lowell Lauriers players
- Lowell Orphans players
- Lowell Millers players
- Lowell Highwaymen players
