= Manchester Yankees =

The Manchester Yankees was the name of two distinct American minor league baseball franchises representing Manchester, New Hampshire, in the Class B New England League (1948 through July 5, 1949) and the Double-A Eastern League (1969–71). Each franchise played at Gill Stadium and each was affiliated with Major League Baseball's New York Yankees.

== History ==
The Manchester Yankees continued Manchester's long history of membership in the New England League that began in 1887. The Yankees were preceded in New England League play by the Manchester Farmers (1887), Manchester Maroons (1888), Manchester Amoskeags (1891), Manchester (1892–1893), Manchester Manchesters (1899), Manchester (1901–1905), Manchester Textiles (1906, 1914–1915) and Manchester Blue Sox (1926–1930). The Manchester Indians played in the 1934 Northeastern League. The New England League Manchester teams were preceded by the Manchester Reds, who were the first minor league baseball team in Manchester, beginning play as members of the 1877 New England Association.

== Postwar Class B team ==
When the New England League (NEL) was revived after World War II, Manchester was a charter member as an affiliate and namesake of the New York Giants. The 1946–47 Manchester Giants each finished in third place during the regular season and qualified for the playoffs, but they were eliminated in the 1946 semi-finals by the Lynn Red Sox and in the 1947 finals by the Nashua Dodgers.

The New York Yankees then replaced the New York Giants as the team's affiliate for the 1948 season. However, the 1948 Manchester Yankees finished four games out of the playoffs and drew the third-smallest attendance in the league. The 1949 edition compiled a record of only 28–44, and dropped out of the league on July 5 — one of four franchises to fold during the NEL's final season.

=== Notable alumni (Manchester Giants) ===
- George Bamberger
- Bob Cain
- Charlie Fox
- Alex Konikowski
- Johnny Pramesa
- Sal Yvars

=== Notable alumni (Manchester Yankees) ===
- Clint Courtney
- Hank Foiles

Year	Record	Finish Full Season	Attendance	Manager	Postseason
1946	75–45	Third	n/a	Hal Gruber	Lost to Lynn in semifinals
1947	74–50	Third	48,877	Hal Gruber	Lost to Nashua in finals
1948	58–68	Fifth	50,664	Tom Padden	
1949	28–44	DNF	30,391	Wally Berger	Disbanded, July 5

== Double-A franchise ==
After the 1968 season, Boston businessman John Alevizos acquired the Yankees' Eastern League affiliate, the Binghamton Triplets, and moved it to Gill Stadium as the Manchester Yankees. In 1969, the franchise led the league in attendance, drawing over 91,000 fans despite finishing in next-to-last place. The 1970 team again finished next to last but plunged to the bottom of the league in attendance. The final, 1971 edition of the Manchester Yankees finished last in its division, and reached a new low in attendance, with just less than 29,000 fans passing through the turnstiles. The team then relocated to Connecticut under new ownership as the West Haven Yankees — winning an Eastern League championship in its maiden season.

Manchester did not receive another Eastern League franchise until 2004, when the New Haven Ravens transferred to Gill Stadium as the New Hampshire Fisher Cats.

=== Notable alumni ===
- Ron Blomberg
- Tom Buskey
- Mario Guerrero
- Doc Medich
- Gerry Pirtle
- Charlie Sands
- Rusty Torres

Year	Record	Finish Full Season	Attendance	Manager	Postseason
1969	64–75	Fifth	91,165	Jerry Walker	
1970	66–73	Fifth	36,928	Gene Hassell	
1971	61–75	Fourth (American Div.)	28,981	Mickey Vernon	

== See also ==
- Gill Stadium
- New Hampshire Fisher Cats

Preceded by Binghamton Triplets	New York Yankees; Double-A affiliate 1969–1971	Succeeded by West Haven Yankees
