= Frank Leonard (baseball) =

Frank J. Leonard was a longtime minor league baseball manager, with a career lasting from 1887 to 1913.

He first managed the Manchester Farmers of the New England League in 1887. In 1888, he led the New England League's Portsmouth Lillies. He next managed the New England League's Portland team in 1891, the Lewiston-Auburn Gazettes in 1892 and then the League's Dover team in 1893. In 1894, he managed the Pawtucket Maroons of the New England League.

In 1895, he led the Salem/Haverhill team in the New England Association as well as the Portland team in the New England League (which he managed until 1896). In 1898, he managed the Taunton Herrings. He led the Worcester Farmers of the Eastern League from 1899 to 1900. In 1901, he led the Syracuse Stars/Brockton B's in the Eastern League, and in 1902 he led the Worcester Hustlers.

Leonard managed the Columbus Senators of the American Association in 1903. From 1905 to 1908, he managed the New England League's Lynn Shoemakers and from 1911 to 1912 he managed the Lynn Leonardites. He last managed the New Brunswick-Maine League's St. John Marathons.
