= Haverhill Hillies =

- 1926–1929; (1919, 1926–1929); Haverhill, Massachusetts

Minor league affiliations
- Class: Class B (1919, 1926–1929)
- League: New England League (1919, 1926–1929)

Major league affiliations
- Team: None

Minor league titles
- League titles (0): None
- Wild card berths (0): None

Team data
- Name: Haverhill Climbers (1919); Haverhill Hillies (1926–1929)
- Ballpark: Haverhill Stadium (1919, 1926–1929)

The Haverhill Hillies were a minor league baseball team based in Haverhill, Massachusetts. The "Hillies" teams played as members of the New England League from 1926 to 1929, finishing in last place twice. The Hillies were preceded in New England League play by the 1919 Haverhill "Climbers," who were managed by Baseball Hall of Fame member Jesse Burkett in their one season of play.

The Haverhill teams both hosted minor league home games at the Haverhill Stadium. Today, the stadium site is still in use and has been renovated to become Trinity Stadium.

== History ==
=== Early minor league teams ===
Haverhill, Massachusetts first hosted minor league baseball in 1877, when the "Haverhill" team became members of the New England Association. The league began play on May 3, 1877, as an eight–team league, but ended the season reduced to four teams with Haverhill among the four teams that folded. The league was one of the earliest minor leagues. The Lowell Ladies Men, with a 33–7 record, won the championship, finishing 4.0 games ahead of the second place Manchester Reds who finished with a 29–11 record. Lowell and Manchester were followed in the final standings by the Fall River Cascades (19–21) and Providence Rhode Islanders (11–29). The Lynn Live Oaks (8–22), Fitchburg, Haverhill and Lawrence franchises all folded before the 1877 New England Association season ended on October 15, 1877. The New England Association folded after the conclusion of the 1877 season.

In the 1885 season, Haverhill next hosted minor league baseball, when the "Haverhill" team resumed play as a member of the five-team Eastern New England League. The league existed for just the 1885 season before the league changed its name and became the long tenured New England League. Haverhill joined the Biddeford Clamdiggers, Lawrence, Newburyport Clamdiggers and Portland as the charter teams, with Lawrence winning the 1885 championship. Haverhill then played as charter members of the New England League in 1886, managed by Baseball Hall of Fame member Frank Selee.

In a New England League contest at Haverhill on July 30, 1894, Haverhill played the Pawtucket Maroons. In the contest, Pawtucket's Buck Freeman hit 4 home runs. Freeman had 13 RBI in the game, while going 5-5 at the plate. Freeman proceeded to hit another 2 home runs the next day.

The 1914 Haverhill Hustlers ended a 13-season tenure as members of the New England League, when the league folded following the season.

=== 1919: Haverhill Climbers - New England League ===
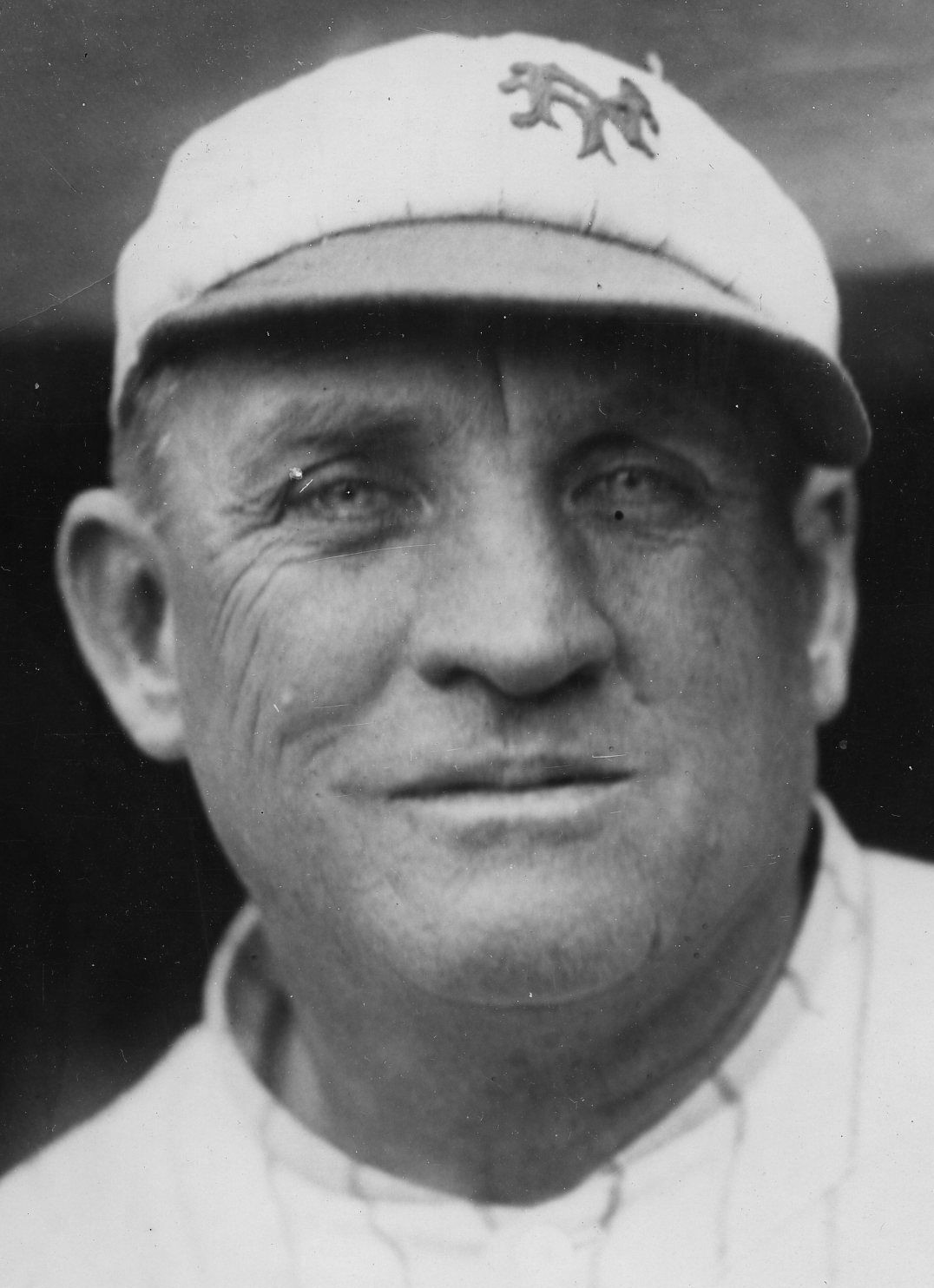
(1920) Baseball Hall of Fame member Jesse Burkett, coach New York Giants. Burkett managed the 1919 Haverhill Climbers.

In 1919, minor league baseball resumed, as the reformed six-team, Class B level New England League, added Haverhill "Climbers" franchise, and Haverhill returned to the league after a four season absence. The 1919 team was also referred to as the "Orphans." Haverhill joined with the Fitchburg Foxes, Lawrence Barristers, Lewiston Red Sox, Lowell Grays and Portland Blue Sox teams in beginning league play on May 23, 1919.

With a hall of fame member as a manager, Haverhill had a final record of 26-40, playing a shortened season under the direction of manager Jesse Burkett. Haverhill was 13.0 games behind the first place Lewiston Red Sox when the league stopped play before the end of the season. The New England League folded on August 2, 1919 with Haverhill in fourth place.

Jesse Burkett was a Baseball Hall of Fame player, who won three National League batting titles between 1895 and 1901, twice hitting over .400. Burkett had a lifetime .338 batting average. Burkett had a lengthy career as a minor league owner and player/manager after his major league baseball career concluded. Before joining Haverhill, Burkett had previously managed and played sporadically for the Worcester Busters in the New England League from 1906 to 1915. After he sold the Worcester team, of which he was an owner, Burkett became the baseball coach at Holy Cross in Worcester from 1917 to 1920, overlapping with his season managing Haverhill. Burkett then became a coach for the New York Giants.

=== 1926 to 1929: Haverhill Hillies - New England League ===
After a six-season absence from minor league baseball, Haverhill returned to minor league play in 1926, when the New England League reformed as a Class B level league with eight teams. The Haverhill "Hillies" became a member of the reformed league, beginning another tenure of a Haverhill franchise playing in the league. Haverhill joined the Lawrence Merry Macks, Lewiston Twins, Lowell Highwaymen, Lynn Papooses, Manchester Blue Sox, Nashua Millionaires and Portland Eskimos teams in beginning play for the reformed league on May 11, 1926.

The Haverhill High School later followed the lead of the minor league team as their athletic teams became known by the "Hillies" nickname in the 1940s, as coined by local sportswriter Walter Ryan.

The Haverhill Hillies began play in the newly formed league and finished in fourth place behind the first place Manchester Bue Sox, who won the 1926 New England League championship. Led by player/manager John Kiernan, Haverhill finished the season with a 49–46 record to place fourth in the final standings, as the Hillies finished 5.5 games behind the first place Manchester team. No playoffs were held. Haverhill's Donald McPhee led New England League pitchers with a 16 wins.

After finishing in fourth place the previous season, the 1927 Haverhill Hillies finished the eight-team Class B level New England League season in last place. As the league adopted a playoff format, Haverhill ended the regular season in eighth place with a 39–57 record in the eight-team league. Playing under returning manager John Kiernan, the Hillies finished 25.5 games behind the first place Lynn Papooses. In the playoff, Lynn swept Portland in four games to win the New England League championship.

Frank McCrehan was a pitcher for the 1927 Haverhill Hillies, compiling a 7–4 record and an ERA of 4.25 on the season. Later in 1926, McCrehan had a change in his baseball career when he joined Jack Slattery's coaching staff at his alma mater Boston College as the pitching coach. In 1931 he became the head coach of the varsity team. He coached Boston College through the 1939 season.

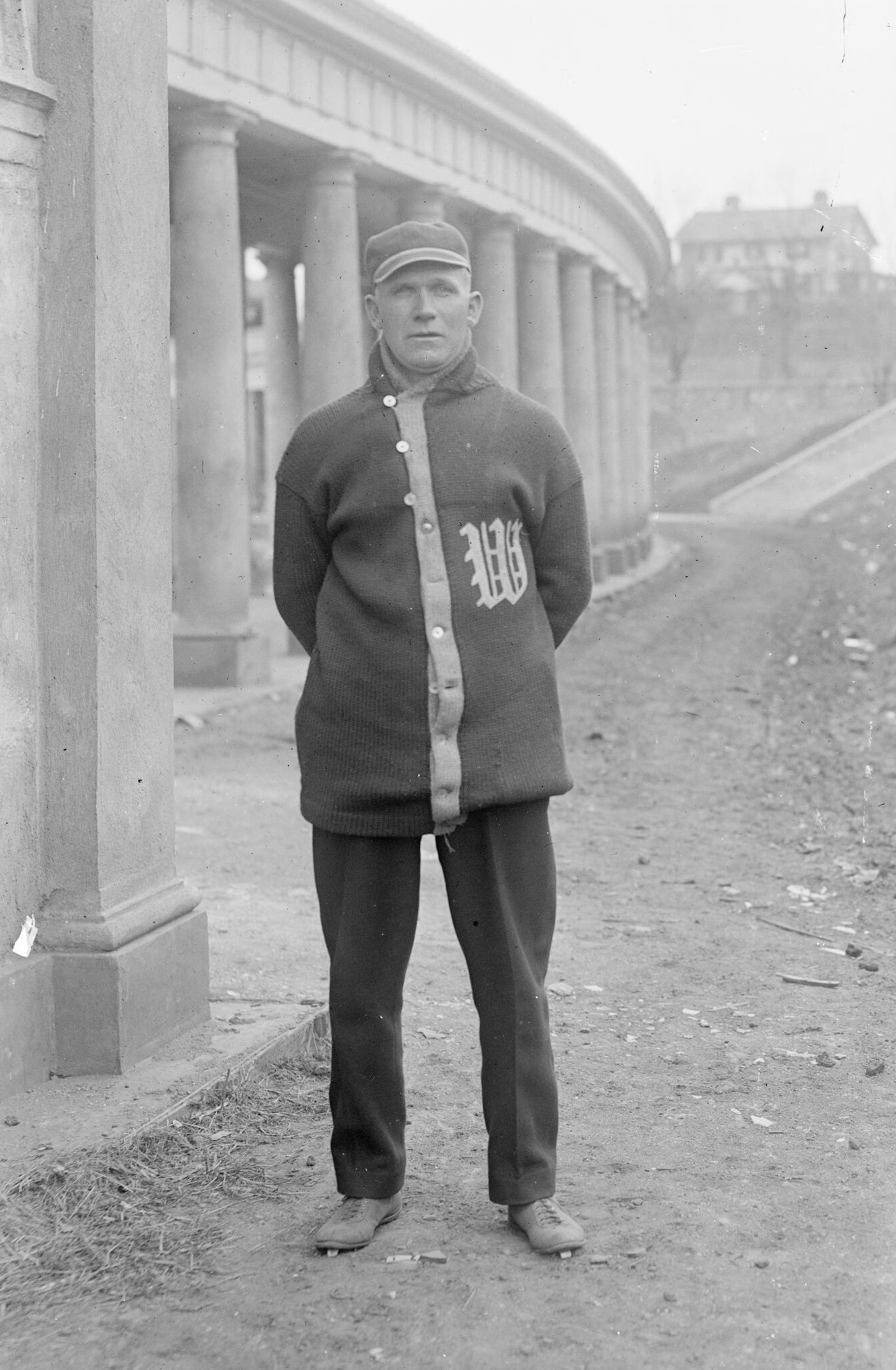
(1915) Jack Ryan. Ryan managed the 1928 Haverhill team.

The 1928 Haverhill Hillies improved from last place the previous season to a seventh-place overall finish in the New England League. Havenhill was under the direction of returning manager John Kiernan and Jack Ryan. Lynn finished in first place in the regular season New England League standings, capturing the league pennant, finishing 7.0 games ahead of Haverhill. The Haverhill Hillies ended the regular season with a 46–48 overall regular season record, while finishing 5.0 games behind the second place Manchester Blue Sox in a competitive league standing. The Lynn Papooses won the second half of the split season schedule after the Attleboro Burros won the first half title and Lynn defeated Attleboro 4 games to 3 in the playoff. Haverhill pitcher Phil Dolan led the New England League with a 14–4 record.

Steve Slayton pitched for Haverhill in 1928 after being sent there by the Boston Red Sox. After finishing an inning, Slayton reportedly asked Boston manager Bill Carrigan, "No shift?" Carrigan, who was hard of hearing, misheard the question and thought the rookie Slaton had made a different comment. Boston and Carrigan innediately sent Slaton to Haverhill before releasing him following the season. After his playing career ended due to back problems, Slayton returned to his hometown of Barre, Vermont and became an educator and trained troops in Vermont during World War II. He coached his alma mater Spaulding High School baseball team to four state championships before his retirement in 1966.

Manager Jack Ryan was a Haverhill, Massachusetts native and a long-time minor-league manager after his playing career. Ryan was a catcher and played from 1889 to 1913 in the American Association, National League and American League. Ryan later coached the Virginia Cavaliers college baseball team. He is noteworthy in baseball history, having played in Major League games in four different decades. Following his tenure with Haverhill in 1928, Ryan remained managing in the 1929 New England League with the New Bedford Millmen at age 60 in his final season as manager.

In 1929, Haverhill played in their final minor league season and the franchise relocated twice before the season ended. On July 28, 1929, the Haverhill Hillies moved to Fitchburg with a record of 11–10 to become the Fitchburg Wanderers. After compiling a record of 5–20 while based in Fitchburg, the team relocated again to become the Gloucester Hillies on August 25, 1929. the Haverhill/Fitchburg/Gloucester team ended the regular season with an overall record of 39–79. The team placed eighth in the standings, playing under managers Jack Driscoll and William McDonough. The combined team finished 37.5 games behind the first place Manchester Blue Sox. The New England League reduced to six teams in 1930, folding the Gloucester team and Haverhill did not return to the league.

Haverhill, Massachusetts has not hosted another minor league team.

== The ballpark ==
The Haverhill Hillies and Haverhill Climbers teams hosted minor league home games at the Haverhill Stadium. The stadium was opened in 1916 and bricks from two demolished shoe factories were reused to build the facility. In the 1930s it underwent a grandstand renovation as part of President Roosevelt’s Works Progress Administration that replaced the original wooden grandstand with cement and brick. Babe Ruth and Lou Gehrig played at the site. The original grandstand was demolished in 1991. In 2017, the grandstand and facility underwent a major renovation. The brick wall perimeter is 12’ high and was built as part of the WPA project in 1935 and the original brick wall still stands (over 2000 feet of wall). In 1960, the newly formed Boston Patriots, held their first intrasquad scrimmage at the stadium. Before renovations, attempts were made in 2004 to have the stadium listed on the National Register of Historic Places.

The site today contains Trinity Stadium within Riverside Park. Utilized by Haverhill High School athletic teams (also known as the "Hillies"), Trinity Stadium is located at 155 Lincoln Ave in Haverhill, Massachusetts.

== Timeline ==
Year(s)	# Yrs.	Team	League	Level	Ballpark
1919	1	Haverhill Climbers	New England League	Class B	Haverhill Stadium
1926–1929	4	Haverhill Hillies	New England League	Class B	Haverhill Stadium

== Year–by–year records ==
Year	Record	Place	Manager	Playoffs/notes
1919	26–40	4th	Jesse Burkett	League folded August 2
1926	49–46	4th	John Kiernan	No playoffs held
1927	35–57	8th	John Kiernan	Did not qualify
1928	46–48	7th	John Kiernan / Jack Ryan	Did not qualify
1929	39–79	8th	Jack Driscoll / William McDonough	Did not qualify

== Notable alumni ==
- Jesse Burkett (1919, MGR) Inducted Baseball Hall of Fame, 1946
- Ed Carroll (1928)
- Harry Heitmann (1927–1928)
- Red Lutz (1927)
- Frank McCrehan (1927)
- Carl Ray (1927)
- Jack Ryan (1928, MGR)
- Steve Slayton (1928)
- Red Torphy (1928)
- Bill Vargus (1927)

== See also ==
- Haverhill Hillies players

== See also ==
- Hillies (disambiguation), nickame list
