= Walker Cress =

American baseball player (1917–1996)

- Pitcher
- Born: March 6, 1917; Ben Hur, Virginia, U.S.
- Died: April 21, 1996 (aged 79); Baton Rouge, Louisiana, U.S.
- Batted: Right Threw: Right

MLB debut
- April 27, 1948, for the Cincinnati Reds

Last MLB appearance
- May 1, 1949, for the Cincinnati Reds

MLB statistics
- Win–loss record: 0–1
- Earned run average: 4.35
- Strikeouts: 33
- Stats at Baseball Reference

Teams
- Cincinnati Reds (1948–1949)

Walker James Cress (March 6, 1917 – April 21, 1996) was an American professional baseball player and scout. The right-handed pitcher appeared in 33 Major League Baseball games, 31 in relief, in 1948 and part of 1949 for the Cincinnati Reds. Born in Ben Hur, Virginia, and nicknamed "Foots", he was listed as 6 feet 5 inches (1.96 m) tall and 205 pounds (93 kg).

Cress played baseball for Louisiana State University from 1938 to 1939. His professional playing career began in 1939 in the Boston Red Sox' farm system. He missed the 1943–1945 seasons In 1946, Cress returned to baseball and won 19 of 22 decisions for the Lynn Red Sox of the Class B New England League. The next year, 1947, he won 15 of 20 decisions for the New Orleans Pelicans of the Double-A Southern Association.

Cress then was acquired by Cincinnati, setting the stage for his major-league career. He worked in 30 games for the 1948 Reds, with two assignments as a starting pitcher. He posted his only MLB complete game on October 1, 1948, during the season's final weekend. Facing the Pittsburgh Pirates at Crosley Field, he had held the Bucs to two hits and no runs over eight innings, and was nursing a 1–0 lead going into the ninth. But in the final frame, he surrendered four hits and two runs, and when the Reds could not respond in their half of the ninth, Cress was tagged with the loss, his only MLB decision.

Cress then worked in three early-season games in 1949 and pitched two scoreless innings coming of the Reds' bullpen before returning to the minors for the rest of his career. As a big leaguer, he allowed 62 hits and 45 bases on balls in 62 total innings pitched, with 33 strikeouts and no saves. He won a combined 33 games for the Tulsa Oilers of the Double-A Texas League in 1949–50, and ended his minor-league career with 99 victories.

After his pitching career, Cress resided in Baton Rouge, LA, working as an electrician, and became a scout for the St. Louis Cardinals, Houston Astros, and San Francisco Giants. He later became the Director of Recreation for BREC, a recreational organization in East Baton Rouge Parish. Cress died at the age of 79 on April 21, 1996, in Baton Rouge.
