= Clyde Sukeforth =

American baseball player, coach, and manager (1901–2000)

- Catcher / Manager
- Born: November 30, 1901; Washington, Maine, U.S.
- Died: September 3, 2000 (aged 98); Waldoboro, Maine, U.S.
- Batted: Left Threw: Right

MLB debut
- May 23, 1926, for the Cincinnati Reds

Last MLB appearance
- June 7, 1945, for the Brooklyn Dodgers

MLB statistics
- Batting average: .264
- Home runs: 2
- Runs batted in: 96
- Stats at Baseball Reference
- Managerial record at Baseball Reference

Teams
- As player: Cincinnati Reds (1926–1931); Brooklyn Dodgers (1932–1934, 1945); As coach: Brooklyn Dodgers (1943–1951); Pittsburgh Pirates (1952–1957)

Clyde Leroy Sukeforth (November 30, 1901 – September 3, 2000), nicknamed "Sukey", was an American baseball catcher, coach, scout and manager. He was best known for scouting and signing Jackie Robinson, the first black player in the modern era of Major League Baseball (MLB), to the Brooklyn Dodgers, after Robinson was scouted by Tom Greenwade in the Negro leagues. He was also instrumental in scouting and acquiring Roberto Clemente for the Pittsburgh Pirates.

== Early life ==
Sukeforth was born in Washington, Maine. His father Pearle was a dairy farmer who played baseball in his spare time. His mother Sarah "Sadie" Sukeforth (née Grinnell). Sukeforth also had an older sister named Hazel (b. 1899).

He graduated from Coburn Classical Institute, a high school in Waterville, Maine, and later attended Georgetown University for two years where he starred as catcher and left fielder for the Georgetown Hoyas baseball team.

== Baseball career ==
=== Eye injury impaired playing career ===
After university, Sukeforth joined the Nashua Millionaires of the New England League and later played for the Manchester Blue Sox. He was acquired by the Cincinnati Reds in 1926.

Sukeforth batted left-handed and threw right-handed, and was listed as 5 feet 10 inches (1.78 m) tall and 155 pounds (70 kg) during his active career. He appeared in 486 games over all or parts of ten big-league seasons (1926–34 and 1945), compiling a batting average of .264 with 326 hits, two home runs and 96 runs batted in.

His best year in the Major Leagues was 1929, when he batted .354 for the Reds with 84 hits in 84 games played. Two years later he lost partial sight of his right eye from being hit by a shotgun pellet while bird hunting on November 16. He was able to continue his playing career, but his batting suffered, and in 1932 Sukeforth was traded to the Brooklyn Dodgers. In mid-1934, the Dodgers sent Sukeforth to the minor leagues, where he became a player-manager in 1936.

=== Witnessed Robinson's historic signing ===
Sukeforth managed in the Brooklyn farm system from 1937 to 1942 with the Clinton Owls of the Class B Three-I League, the Elmira Pioneers of the Class A Eastern League and the Montreal Royals of the top-level International League before his promotion to the Dodger coaching staff in 1943. He also was activated by Brooklyn at age 43 for 18 games during the first three months of the 1945 season, the last year of the World War II manpower shortage, despite not having played competitively since 1939, when he was a player-manager at Elmira. Sukeforth started 13 games as Brooklyn's catcher, and collected 15 hits, although only one was for extra bases, a double struck against Jim Tobin of the Boston Braves on April 24. He batted .288 in 55 at-bats.

Sukeforth soon retired permanently from the playing ranks and resumed his former job as a Brooklyn coach and occasional special-assignment scout. In that capacity, later that season, he would make history. Dodger president Branch Rickey was making secret plans to break organized baseball's six-decades-long "gentleman's agreement" that enforced racial segregation. In August, Rickey sent Sukeforth to Chicago, where Robinson's team, the Kansas City Monarchs of the Negro leagues, was slated to play the Chicago American Giants. Rickey told Sukeforth to urge Robinson to come back with him to Brooklyn for a meeting with Rickey and the Dodgers. Sukeforth met Robinson again in Toledo, Ohio, and the two men traveled by railway to Brooklyn for the historic meeting at the Dodgers' Montague Street offices on August 28. He was the only other person in the room when Rickey told Robinson of his plans to offer him a contract to play in Montreal in 1946.

Then, in 1947, Sukeforth—functioning in the unwanted role of interim manager of the Dodgers after the suspension of Leo Durocher—wrote Robinson's name into the Dodger lineup on Opening Day on April 15 against the Braves at Ebbets Field.

In addition to serving on Durocher's coaching staff and his scouting assignments for Dodgers president Rickey, he worked behind the scenes in 1946 to help create the new Nashua Dodgers of the Class B New England League. Sukeforth helped the Nashua team forge ties with the New Hampshire community, easing the racial integration of the league when Roy Campanella and Don Newcombe were assigned to that club.

=== Turned down two managerial opportunities ===
Sukeforth won his only two games as the Dodgers' manager in 1947, 5–3 and 12–6, both against Boston. Durocher had been suspended for the entire 1947 season by Commissioner of Baseball Happy Chandler because of "conduct detrimental to baseball." But Sukeforth and a fellow coach, Ray Blades, both turned down the opportunity to serve as acting manager for the rest of the season; ultimately, Brooklyn scout and longtime Rickey associate Burt Shotton assumed that role, and Shotton led the Dodgers to the 1947 National League pennant.

In 1951, when Dodger manager Chuck Dressen needed a reliever to face the New York Giants' Bobby Thomson in the ninth inning of the decisive third game of the National League pennant playoff, Sukeforth, coaching in the Dodger bullpen, passed over Carl Erskine and sent in Ralph Branca, who gave up Thomson's "shot heard 'round the world". On January 9, 1952, Sukeforth resigned as a Dodgers coach, then a few weeks later signed to be a coach with the Pittsburgh Pirates, where Rickey was executive vice president and general manager.

There, as a coach and occasional scout, he played a pivotal role in the drafting of Roberto Clemente from the Brooklyn organization in the 1954 Rule 5 draft. Rickey initially sent Sukeforth to scout former major league pitcher Joe Black, who was toiling for Brooklyn's Montreal Royals Triple-A affiliate. Instead, Sukeforth became interested in a 20-year-old Dodger prospect: Clemente. Sukeforth told Pirates' beat writer Les Biederman, "I knew then he'd be our first draft choice." Before leaving, he recalled, "I told Montreal manager Max Macon to take good care of 'our boy' and see that he didn't get hurt." Good to his word, the Pirates drafted Clemente on November 22, 1954. Clemente forged an 18-year Hall of Fame career with the Pirates, leading them to the 1960 and 1971 world championships, compiling an even 3,000 hits, and earning an immediate elevation to Cooperstown after his untimely death in a plane crash while on a humanitarian mission to earthquake-ravaged Nicaragua on December 31, 1972.

Once again passing up a Major League managing assignment after turning down the chance to succeed Pirate skipper Bobby Bragan on August 3, 1957, Sukeforth retired as a coach at the end of the 1957 season.

=== Later career ===
Sukeforth remained in the Pirates organization as a scout and occasional minor league manager through 1965. Later, he worked as a scout for the Atlanta Braves.

== Personal life ==
Sukeforth was married twice. His first wife Helen (née Miller), whom he married in 1933, died from complications after childbirth, two weeks after the birth of their daughter Helen (1938-2024) who was named so in honor of her mother. Sukeforth remarried in December 1951, to Grethel Winchenbach (née Pitcher), a widow from Waldoboro, Maine, and they remained together until her death in 1999.

Sukeforth died at the age of ninety-eight at his home in Waldoboro; he was buried in Brookland Cemetery, next to his first wife. Through his daughter, Sukeforth had four grandchildren and eleven great-grandchildren.

== In popular culture ==
Sukeforth appears in the Norman Rockwell painting Tough Call.

In 42, the 2013 sports film about Robinson's breaking of the baseball color line, Sukeforth is played by actor Toby Huss.

The Northern New England chapter of the Society of American Baseball Research, located in Concord, New Hampshire, is named in honor of Sukeforth.
