= Oscar Estrada =

Cuban baseball player (born 1904)

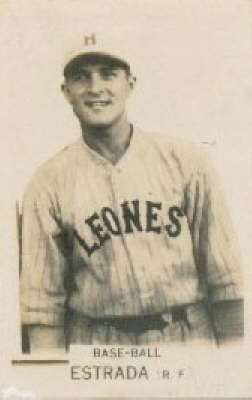
- Outfielder / Pitcher / First baseman
- Born: February 15, 1904; Havana, Cuba, U.S.
- Died: January 2, 1978 (aged 73); Havana, Cuba, U.S.
- Batted: Left Threw: Left

MLB debut
- 1924, for the Cuban Stars East

Last MLB appearance
- April 21, 1929, for the St. Louis Browns

MLB statistics
- Batting average: .214
- Home runs: 1
- Runs batted in: 12
- Earned run average: 4.58
- Stats at Baseball Reference

Teams
- Cuban Stars East (1924); St. Louis Browns (1929)

Oscar Estrada (February 15, 1904 – January 2, 1978) was a Cuban professional baseball outfielder, pitcher and first baseman who appeared in one Major League Baseball (MLB) game for the St. Louis Browns in 1929 and in the Negro leagues. The left-hander stood 5'8" and weighed 160 lbs.

Estrada played in 1924 and 1925 for the integrated Cuban Stars (East) in the Eastern Colored League but most of his baseball career was in Cuba. In 1926 and 1927, Estrada pitched for the Lynn Papooses of the New England League. He played for the Shreveport Sports in 1929.

On April 21, 1929, the 25-year-old Estrada came in to pitch the top of the 9th inning in a home game against the Detroit Tigers at Sportsman's Park. He was the Browns' fourth pitcher in the game, relieving Herb Cobb. He pitched a scoreless inning, although he allowed a hit and a walk, but the Browns lost 16–9. His lifetime ERA stands at 0.00.

Following his brief major league stint, Estrada returned to the Sports. His minor league baseball career continued until 1934, which he split between the Syracuse Chiefs, Greensboro Patriots, and Harrisburg Senators.

He died in his hometown of Havana, Cuba at the age of 73.
