= Fitchburg, Massachusetts minor league baseball history =

Fitchburg, Massachusetts minor league baseball teams
- 1877–1929; (1877, 1895, 1899, 1914–1915, 1919, 1922, 1929); Fitchburg, Massachusetts

Minor league affiliations
- Class: Independent (1899 1895, 1899); Class B (1914–1915, 1919); Class A (1922); Class B (1929)
- League: New England Association (1877, 1895); New England League (1899, 1914–1915, 1919); Eastern League (1922); New England League (1929)

Major league affiliations
- Team: None

Minor league titles
- League titles (0): None

Team data
- Name: Fitchburg (1877, 1895, 1899); Fitchburg Burghers (1914–1915); Fitchburg Foxes (1919); Fitchburg Boosters (1922); Fitchburg Wanderers (1929)
- Ballpark: Fitchburg Driving Park (1895, 1899, 1914–1915, 1919, 1922, 1929)

Minor league baseball teams were based in Fitchburg, Massachusetts between 1877 and 1929. Fitchburg minor league teams played as members of the New England Association in 1877 and 1895, the New England League in 1899, 1914–1915 and 1919, the Eastern League in 1922 and New England League in 1929. Fitchburg hosted minor league home games ad the Fitchburg Driving Park.

The legendary athlete Jim Thorpe played for the 1922 Fitchburg Boosters.

== History ==
In 1877, minor league baseball began in Fitchburg, Massachusetts. The Fitchburg team was a charter member of the eight–team New England Association. The Fitchburg team's 1877 final record, roster and statistics are unknown, as the team folded during the season.

The 1895 "Fitchburg" team became members of the reformed six–team New England Association. On June 20, 1895, Fitchburg had compiled a 12–25 record, playing under managers William Dwyer and William Laverty, when the team folded. The New England Association permanently folded on July 8, 1895.

"Fitchburg" resumed minor league play as members of the 1899 New England League but relocated during the season. On May 24, 1899, Fitchburg had a record of 3–7 when the team moved to Lawrence. Playing under manager Ed Norton, the Fitchburg/Lawrence team had an overall record of 3–14 when the franchise disbanded on June 1, 1899.

In 1914, Fitchburg rejoined the eight–team Class B level New England League, with the team relocating during the season and finishing last in the standings. On July 30, 1914, the Fitchburg Burghers had a record of 24–52 when the franchise moved to Manchester, New Hampshire, finishing the season as the Manchester Textiles. After a 12–35 record while based in Manchester, the Fitchburg/Manchester team finished the season with an overall record of 36–87 to place eighth in the final league standings. Playing under manager Fred Lake, Fitchburg/Manchester finished 48.0 games behind the first place Lawrence Barristers.

The Fitchburg use of the "Burghers" moniker corresponds phonetically, and the word refers to a Burgher being a "privileged citizen" in medieval times.

On May 25, 1914, it was reported Fitchburg was defeated by the Lowell Grays by the score of 5–3. Lowell pitcher Jimmy Ring made his first professional career start and threw a complete game five–hitter for Lowell.

The 1915 Fitchburg Burghers franchise resumed New England League play, despite relocating the previous season, as the Manchester Textiles franchise also continued play. The Burghers again finished last in the standings. Fitchburg ended the season with a record of 46–89 to place eighth, playing under manager Hugh McCune. The Burghers finished 28.0 games behind the first place Portland Duffs in the final standings. After the 1915 season, the New England League folded.

The 1919 New England League resumed play as a six-team league. The Fitchburg Foxes placed third in the reformed Class B level league, after the league stopped play on August 2, 1919. The Foxes had a record of 31–36, playing under managers John F. Quinn, Bill Phoenix and Bill Page. Fitchburg was 9.0 games behind the first place Lowell Grays franchise when the league folded.

The Fitchburg Boosters resumed play in 1922. Playing as members of the eight team Class A level Eastern League, Fitchburg relocated during the season as the combined team finished last in the standings. On July 30, 1922, Fitchburg moved to Worcester, Massachusetts with a record of 18–46. After an 29–59 record playing in Worcester, the Fitchburg/Worcester team finished with an overall record of 47–105, to place eighth in the standings. The team was managed by Jack Mack and John Flynn, finishing 54.0 games behind the first place New Haven Indians. Olympic Champion, former major league player and Pro Football Hall of Fame member Jim Thorpe played for the 1922 Boosters, in his final professional baseball season at age 35. It was reported that Thorpe was recruited to Fitchburg by team owner John Kiernan after being released by the Hartford Senators of the Eastern League. Thorpe hit .344 for the season, second in the league, adding 9 home runs in 96 games.

In 1929, Fitchburg played in their final minor league season. The Fitchburg "Wanderers" had a short appearance as members of the Class B New England League. On July 28, 1929, the Haverhill Hillies moved to Fitchburg with a record of 11–10. After compiling a record of 5–20 while based in Fitchburg, the team relocated to become the Gloucester Hillies on August 25, 1929. the Haverhill/Fitchburg/Gloucester team ended the regular season with an overall record of 39–79. The team placed eighth in the standings, playing under managers Jack Driscoll and William McDonough. The combined team finished 37.5 games behind the first place Manchester Blue Sox. The New England League reduced to six teams in 1930, folding the Gloucester team.

Fitchburg, Massachusetts has not hosted another minor league team.

== The ballpark ==
The Fitchburg minor league teams were reported to played home games at the "Fitchburg Driving Park". Reportedly, manager Fred Lake created a batters eye on the 1914 outfield fence, as the rest of the fence had advertisements. It was noted the ballpark was also known as the "Summer Street Grounds."

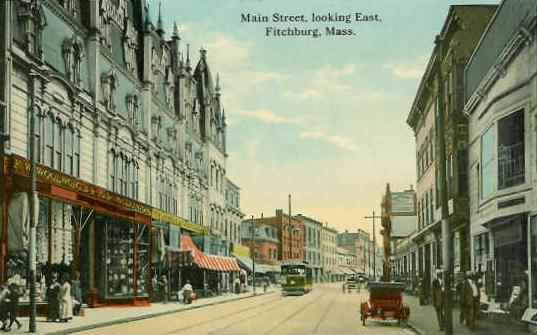
(1912) Main Street. Fitchburg, Massachusetts

== Timeline ==
Year(s)	# Yrs.	Team	Level	League	Ballpark
1877, 1895	2	Fitchburg	Independent	New England Association	Fitchburg Driving Park
1899	1	Fitchburg	Independent	New England League	Fitchburg Driving Park
1914–1915	2	Fitchburg Burghers	Class B	New England League	Fitchburg Driving Park
1919	1	Fitchburg Foxes	Class B	New England League	Fitchburg Driving Park
1922	1	Fitchburg Boosters	Class A	Eastern League	Fitchburg Driving Park
1929	1	Fitchburg Wanderers	Class B	New England League	Fitchburg Driving Park

== Year-by-year records ==
Year	Record	Finish	Manager	Playoffs/notes
1877	00–00	NA	NA	Team folded – record unknown
1895	12–25	NA	William Dwyer / William Laverty	Team folded June 20
1899	3–14	NA	Ed Norton	Fitchburg (3–7) moved to Lawrence May 24; Team disbanded June 1.
1914	36–87	8th	Fred Lake	Fitchburg (24–52) moved to Manchester July 30
1915	46–89	8th	Hugh McCune	No playoffs held
1919	31–36	3rd	John F. Quinn; Bill Phoenix / Bill Page	League folded August 2
1922	47–105	8th	Jack Mack / John Flynn	Fitchburg moved to Worcester (18–46) July 30
1929	39–79	8th	Jack Driscoll / William McDonough	Haverhill (11–10) moved to Fitchburg July 28; Fitchburg (5–20) moved to Gloucester August 25.

== Notable alumni ==
- Jim Thorpe (1922) Pro Football Hall of Fame
- Jim Adams (1899)
- Bill Clay (baseball) (1915)
- Wilson Collins (1915)
- Fred Donovan (1895)
- Rich Durning (1915)
- Alex Gaston (1915)
- Tom Hart (1895)
- Nat Hickey (1922)
- Jack Hoey (1915)
- Pat Kilhullen (1914)
- Fred Lake (1914, MGR)
- Al Lawson (1895)
- Axel Lindstrom (1922)
- Dick Loftus (1919)
- Bill Magee (1895)
- Allie Moulton (1915)
- Dominic Mulrenan (1915, 1922)
- Connie Murphy (1899)
- Frederick V. Ostergren (1914)
- Kewpie Pennington (1915)
- Pop Smith (1899)
- Red Torphy (1914)

== See also ==
- Lawrence Barristers players
- Fitchburg (minor league baseball) players
- Fitchburg Foxes players
