= Worcester Farmers =

Minor league baseball team

The Worcester Farmers were a minor league baseball team that played in Worcester, Massachusetts from 1899 to 1900 for the Eastern League. Under manager Frank Leonard in 1899, they went 58-51, and in 1900 they went 62-63.

They were renamed the Worcester Quakers in 1901 and the Worcester Hustlers in 1902. In 1903, they became the Worcester Riddlers, but the team collapsed during the season and moved to become the Montreal Royals.
