= Nashua Dodgers =

- 1946–1949; Nashua, New Hampshire

Minor league affiliations
- Class: Class B (1946–1949)
- League: New England League (1946–1949)

Major league affiliations
- Team: Brooklyn Dodgers (1946–1949)

Minor league titles
- League titles: 1946; 1947; 1949

Team data
- Name: Nashua Dodgers (1946–1949)
- Ballpark: Holman Stadium (1946–1949)

The Nashua Dodgers was a farm club of the Brooklyn Dodgers, operating in the class-B New England League between 1946 and 1949. It is the first professional baseball team based in the United States in the twentieth century to play with a racially integrated roster. The team was based at Holman Stadium in Nashua, New Hampshire.

== History ==
Beginning with the 1895 Nashua Rainmakers of the New England Association, Nashua had a baseball history that included previous New England League teams beginning in 1901 and a team in the 1907 New Hampshire State League. After Nashua first played in the New England League from 1901 to 1905, the Nashua Millionaires directly preceded the Dodgers as members of previous New England League formations, playing in the 1926–1927, 1929–1930 and 1933 seasons.

=== 1946 season ===
In 1945, Dodgers president Branch Rickey contacted executive (Emil J.) Buzzie Bavasi, who was relaxing with family in Georgia after his return from Italy during World War II, and asked Bavasi to find a suitable location for a club in the newly reformed New England League. Rickey had just signed Jackie Robinson to a contract, and while Robinson and Johnny Wright were expected to integrate the International League as a member of the Montreal Royals, Bavasi believed that Rickey would sign other African American players during the 1945-46 offseason. With the possibility that the New England League club would be integrated, Bavasi looked for a community with a significant French Canadian population (believing that the ethnic group would be accepting of African Americans) and a racially progressive newspaper. He chose Nashua, New Hampshire.

Nashua's population of approximately 34,000 made it the smallest New England League city; the next largest, Portland, was more than double the size of Nashua. Furthermore, the city counted fewer than fifty African Americans in its population. But it boasted a sizable French Canadian population. Bavasi negotiated for the lease of Holman Stadium, a nine–year–old multipurpose stadium owned by the city, and spoke with Nashua Telegraph editor Fred Dobens about the city's racial climate. By the middle of March, Rickey had signed two African American players, catcher Roy Campanella and pitcher Don Newcombe, to play for the Dodgers organization. Initially he offered Campanella to the Danville, Illinois-based Danville Dodgers of the Three-I League, but the Danville general manager believed that his league was not ready for integration. Bavasi readily accepted the two players. Rickey did not announce the signings to the media for another month, however, to give Bavasi time to integrate the team into the community.

To promote the Nashua Dodgers within the community, Bavasi arranged for local war veterans to try out for the club, and also made the signing of French Canadian ballplayers a top priority. On March 21, he named Fred Dobens President of the Nashua Dodgers. Dobens turned to his younger brother, Ray Dobens, a former pitcher for the Boston Red Sox, for the baseball knowledge to help operate the team. Meanwhile, Bavasi subsequently began to promote the ties of Brooklyn Dodgers scout Clyde Sukeforth to the city. Sukeforth, who had scouted Robinson, Newcombe, and Campanella for Brooklyn, had played minor-league baseball briefly in Nashua in 1926, and the Telegraph made that fact known to the public. Finally, on April 4, Fred Dobens announced that Campanella and Newcombe would join the Dodgers in Nashua.

Although Bavasi attempted to sign Frenchy Bordagaray to manage the club, Bordagaray was assigned to the Dodgers' class–C club in Trois-Rivières, Quebec. The Nashua business manager also looked at signing Jake Pitler to manage the team, but decided that Pitler would not be able to handle some of the problems that might arise on a racially integrated club as well as other managers might. Finally, Bavasi settled on Walter Alston to manage the club and play first base. That season at Manchester Athletic Field (Gill Stadium), Alston would collide with Manchester Giants catcher Sal Yvars, ending Alston's playing career.

Except for a few racially charged incidents featuring the Lynn Red Sox, the 1946 season proceeded without fanfare. Campanella, who wore number 10, batted .291, hit thirteen home runs, and was named the team's Most Valuable Player. He also managed one game in Lawrence, Massachusetts, after Alston was ejected, becoming the first African American to manage an integrated professional baseball team. Newcombe, who wore number 24 for Nashua, won 14 and lost 4 games, boasted a 2.21 earned run average, and hit .311—even pinch hitting in some games. The Dodgers placed second in 1946, but won the league championship by defeating Lynn.

=== 1947 season ===
The team's success carried into the 1947 season. Although Campanella and Bavasi were promoted to Montreal of the International League, Newcombe remained in Nashua. The club again placed second, but won the Governor's Cup for the second year in a row.

=== 1948 season ===
Although Newcombe was promoted, the Nashua Dodgers remained integrated in 1948 with the addition of Dan Bankhead, who had been a pitcher with Brooklyn. Nashua was managed by Al Campanis, who was a teammate of Jackie Robinson in Montreal in 1946. The Dodgers again placed second, but won the Governors' Cup.

=== 1949 season ===
In 1949, as major-leaguers Don Newcombe and Roy Campanella led the Brooklyn Dodgers to a pennant, the Nashua Dodgers again seemed ready to compete for the Governors' Cup. However, in July, partly as a result of a collapse in the region's industrial economy, teams from Providence, Manchester, Fall River, and Lynn disbanded, leaving only Nashua, Springfield, Portland, and Pawtucket to finish the season. Sensing doom, Branch Rickey reassigned his best players to other teams, among them Gino Cimoli, so-called "bonus baby" Billy Loes, and Wayne Belardi. Despite its good overall performance in 1949, Nashua finished the second half of the season in last place, and was the only team to miss the playoffs. With that, the New England League folded, and with it the Nashua Dodgers.

== Season-by-season record ==
Year	Record	Finish Full Season	Attendance	Manager	Postseason
1946	80–41	Second	n/a	Walter Alston	League champions
1947	82–44	Second	70,813	Fats Dantonio	League champions
1948	84–41	Second	63,382	Al Campanis	League champions
1949	71–52	Second	38,979	Greg Mulleavy	DNQ

== Notable alumni ==
- Walter Alston (1946, player/manager) Inducted Baseball Hall of Fame, 1983
- Roy Campanella (1946) Inducted Baseball Hall of Fame, 1969
- Dan Bankhead (1948), first Black MLB pitcher
- Wayne Belardi (1949)
- Al Campanis (1948, player/manager)
- Gino Cimoli (1949), MLB All-Star
- Otis Davis (1947)
- Billy DeMars (1946)
- Marion Fricano (1949)
- Lee Griffeth (1948)
- Don Hoak (1948), MLB All-Star
- Billy Hunter (1949), MLB All-Star; Baltimore Orioles Hall of Fame
- Billy Loes (1949), MLB All-Star
- Bob Milliken (1947)
- Larry Shepard (1946)
- Don Newcombe (1946–1947), four-time MLB All-Star; 1949 NL Rookie of the Year; 1956 NL Most Valuable Player; 1956 Cy Young Award
- Jim Romano (1947)
- Nashua Dodgers players

== Sources ==
- Baseball Reference
