= Del Bissonette =

American baseball player, coach, and manager

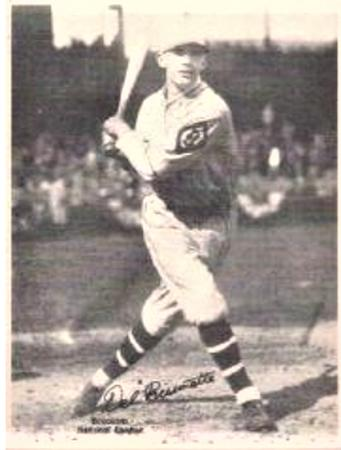
- First baseman / Manager
- Born: September 6, 1899; Winthrop, Maine, U.S.
- Died: June 9, 1972 (aged 72); Augusta, Maine, U.S.
- Batted: Left Threw: Left

MLB debut
- April 11, 1928, for the Brooklyn Robins

Last MLB appearance
- June 4, 1933, for the Brooklyn Dodgers

MLB statistics
- Batting average: .305
- Home runs: 66
- Runs batted in: 391
- Managerial record: 25–34
- Winning %: .424
- Stats at Baseball Reference

Teams
- As player: Brooklyn Robins/Dodgers (1928–1931, 1933); As manager: Boston Braves (1945); As coach: Boston Braves (1945); Pittsburgh Pirates (1946)

Adelphia Louis Bissonette (September 6, 1899 – June 9, 1972) was an American professional baseball player, coach and manager. He played in Major League Baseball as a first baseman for the Brooklyn Dodgers (then known as the Brooklyn Robins) from 1928 to 1933. After his playing career Bissonette continued to work in professional baseball as a coach and manager.

== Playing career ==
Born in Winthrop, Maine, Bissonette attended Kents Hill School, Westbrook Seminary, the University of New Hampshire and Georgetown University before signing a professional baseball contract with Valleyfield–Cap de la Madeleine in the Class B Eastern Canada League in 1922. A left-handed batting and throwing first baseman, Bissonette was an outstanding hitter, batting .381 for York of the Class A New York–Penn League in 1925. In 1927, playing for the Buffalo Bisons, Bissonette led the top-level International League in runs (168), hits (229), doubles (46), triples (20), home runs (31), and runs batted in (167). His .367 batting average was nine points behind the IL's batting champion that season.

The following season, Bissonette joined the Brooklyn Robins — the once and future Dodgers — of the National League and continued his lusty hitting, batting .320 with 25 home runs in 155 games. Although he tailed off in 1929, Bissonette rebounded in 1930 by driving in 113 runs and batting .336. In one game on April 21, 1930 Bissonette became the first known player in Major League history to hit a bases-loaded triple and a bases-loaded home run (a grand slam) in the same game, a rare feat matched only by a handful of players since. But 1930 was his last productive season as a Major League player. He suffered a tendon injury, missed the entire 1932 season with an illness, and was back in the International League by the middle of the 1933 campaign. In 604 MLB games played, overall or parts of five seasons with Brooklyn, Bissonette batted .305 with 66 homers and 391 RBI.

== Manager and coach ==
Bissonette turned to managing in the minor leagues in 1937 and by 1942 he had joined the Boston Braves farm system as pilot of their Class A Hartford Chiefs affiliate in the Eastern League. When Hartford won 99 games and the 1944 EL regular season pennant, Bissonette was promoted to a coaching job with Boston. After 93 games, with the 1945 Braves faltering and in seventh place in the National League, manager Bob Coleman was fired July 31 and Bissonette took the helm for the remainder of the season. His Braves won 25 and lost 34 (.424), improving to sixth, but the team lured the highly successful Billy Southworth from the St. Louis Cardinals to be its 1946 manager, and Bissonette moved on to the Pittsburgh Pirates, where he signed as a coach for 1946.

By 1947, Bissonette was back in the minor leagues as a manager with the Portland Pilots of the Class B New England League. He rose as high as the Triple-A Toronto Maple Leafs in 1949, but never managed again in the Majors. He died by suicide in Augusta, Maine in 1972 at age 72.
