= Providence Chiefs =

Minor league baseball team, 1946–1947

The Providence Chiefs, sometimes known as the Cranston Chiefs, were a Rhode Island–based minor league baseball team in the Class B New England League. During 1946 and 1947, the club was known as the Chiefs, and its team logo was a fire chief. In 1948 and 1949, the team was known as the Providence Grays. The team disbanded on June 20, 1949, in the middle of the New England League's final season.

== Sources ==
"New England League 1946-1949," https://www.webcitation.org/5knFHkUvW?url=http://www.geocities.com/big_bunko/newengland4649.htm .
