= Haverhill Hustlers =

Minor League Baseball Team

The Haverhill Hustlers were a minor league baseball team located in Haverhill, Massachusetts. They played in the New England League from 1901 to 1914. The team's roster included player-manager and Baseball Hall of Fame member Billy Hamilton.

The Haverhill Hustlers were preceded by two "Haverhill" teams that played in 1877 and 1895 as members of the New England Association.

Following the Hustlers as members of the New England League were the Haverhill Orphans (1919) and the Haverhill Hillies (1926-1929).

All Haverhill minor league teams played at Athletic Park.
