= Portsmouth Lillies =

The Portsmouth Lillies were a minor league baseball team that played in Portsmouth, New Hampshire, for part of one season in 1888.

The Lillies started play on July 20, 1888 in the New England League. They replaced a team from Portland, Maine who had folded in June 1888. The Lillies finished with a record of 12 wins and 20 losses, the worst winning percentage of any team that finished the 1888 season. There is no record of them playing after 1888. Though the team only played for a half-season, the league they played in (the New England League) existed in various forms from 1886 to 1949.

The Lillies were managed by Frank Leonard. Despite the short life of the team, nine Portsmouth players went on to play at least one major league baseball game, and one player, Billy Murray, went on to become a major league manager with the Phillies. Malachi Kittridge may be the most notable former Portsmouth player; he played 1,216 major league games after his time with the Lillies.
