= Don Newcombe =

American baseball player (1926–2019)

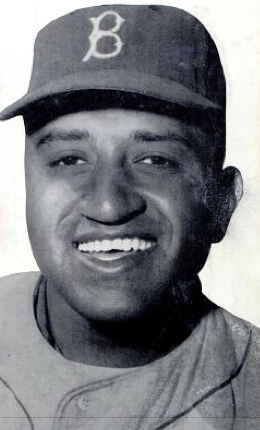
- Newcombe in 1955
- Pitcher
- Born: June 14, 1926; Madison, New Jersey, U.S.
- Died: February 19, 2019 (aged 92); Los Angeles, California, U.S.
- Batted: Left Threw: Right

Professional debut
- NgL: 1944, for the Newark Eagles
- MLB: May 20, 1949, for the Brooklyn Dodgers
- NPB: June 23, 1962, for the Chunichi Dragons

Last appearance
- MLB: October 1, 1960, for the Cleveland Indians
- NPB: October 9, 1962, for the Chunichi Dragons

MLB statistics
- Win–loss record: 153–96
- Earned run average: 3.57
- Strikeouts: 1,185

NPB statistics
- Batting average: .262
- Home runs: 12
- Runs batted in: 43
- Stats at Baseball Reference

Teams
- Newark Eagles (1944–1945); Brooklyn / Los Angeles Dodgers (1949–1951, 1954–1958); Cincinnati Redlegs / Reds (1958–1960); Cleveland Indians (1960); Chunichi Dragons (1962)

Career highlights and awards
- 4× All-Star (1949–1951, 1955); World Series champion (1955); NL MVP (1956); Cy Young Award (1956); NL Rookie of the Year (1949); MLB wins leader (1956); MLB strikeout leader (1951); Legend of Dodger Baseball

Donald Newcombe (June 14, 1926 – February 19, 2019), nicknamed "Newk", was an American professional baseball pitcher who played ten non-consecutive seasons in Major League Baseball (MLB). He began his career in the Negro National League and ended it in Nippon Professional Baseball (NPB).

Newcombe was the first pitcher to win the Rookie of the Year, Most Valuable Player, and Cy Young Awards during his career. This distinction would not be achieved again until 2011, when Detroit Tigers pitcher Justin Verlander, who was Rookie of the Year in 2006, won the Cy Young and MVP awards. In 1949, he became the first black pitcher to start a World Series game. In 1951, Newcombe was the first black pitcher to win 20 games in one season. In 1956, the inaugural year of the Cy Young Award, he became the first pitcher to win the National League MVP and the Cy Young in the same season.

Newcombe was an excellent hitting pitcher who compiled a career batting average of .271 with 15 home runs and was used as a pinch hitter, a rarity for pitchers.

== Early life ==
Newcombe was born in Madison, New Jersey, on June 14, 1926, and was raised in Elizabeth. He had three brothers and a sister. His father worked as a chauffeur.

Newcombe attended Jefferson High School in Elizabeth. The school did not have a baseball team, so Newcombe played semi-professional baseball while attending high school.

== Career ==
After playing briefly with the Newark Eagles in the Negro National League in 1944 and 1945, Newcombe signed with the Dodgers. With catcher Roy Campanella, Newcombe played for the first racially integrated baseball team based in the United States in the 20th century, the 1946 Nashua Dodgers of the New England League. He continued to play for Nashua in 1947 before being promoted to the Montreal Royals of the Triple-A International League in 1948.

Newcombe debuted for Brooklyn on May 20, 1949, becoming the third African American pitcher in the major leagues, after Dan Bankhead and Satchel Paige. Effa Manley, business manager for the Eagles, agreed to let the Dodgers' Branch Rickey sign Newcombe to a contract. Manley was not compensated for the release of Newcombe. He immediately helped the Dodgers to the league pennant as he earned seventeen victories, led the league in shutouts, and pitched 32 consecutive scoreless innings. He was also among the first four black players to be named to an All-Star team, along with teammates Jackie Robinson and Roy Campanella and the Indians' Larry Doby. Newcombe was named Rookie of the Year by both The Sporting News and the Baseball Writers' Association of America. In 1950, he won 19 games, and 20 the following season, also leading the league in strikeouts in 1951. In the memorable playoff game between the Dodgers and the Giants at the end of the 1951 season, Newcombe was relieved by Ralph Branca in the bottom of the ninth inning when Clyde Sukeforth instructed manager Chuck Dressen to bring in Branca. Branca then surrendered the walk-off home run to Bobby Thomson to give the Giants the pennant.

After two years of mandatory military duty during the Korean War, Newcombe suffered a disappointing season in 1954, going 9–8 with a 4.55 earned run average, but returned to form the next year by finishing second in the NL in both wins and earned run average, with marks of 20–5 and 3.20, as the Dodgers won their first World Series in franchise history. He had an even greater 1956 season, with marks of 27–7, 139 strikeouts, and a 3.06 ERA, five shutouts and 18 complete games, leading the league in winning percentage for the second year in a row. He was named the National League's MVP, and was awarded the first-ever Cy Young Award, then given to the best pitcher in the combined major leagues. He was the only player to win MVP, Cy Young and Rookie of the Year awards until Justin Verlander accomplished the feat in 2011. Newcombe had a difficult time in the 1956 World Series. He was the losing pitcher in Game 7. Berra, who hit three home runs off of him in the series, hit two of them in Game 7. The Yankees and Johnny Kucks won 9–0.

Following the Dodgers' move to Los Angeles, Newcombe got off to an 0–6 start in 1958 before being traded to the Cincinnati Reds for Steve Bilko, Johnny Klippstein, and two players to be named later during the season. He posted a record of 24–21 with Cincinnati until his contract was sold to Cleveland in mid-1960. He finished with a 2–3 mark in Cleveland before being released to end his major league career. Newcombe acknowledged that alcoholism played a significant role in the decline of his career.

On May 28, 1962, Newcombe signed with the Chunichi Dragons of Nippon Professional Baseball's Central League. Newcombe played one season in Japan, splitting time as an outfielder and a first baseman, only pitching in one game. In 81 games, he hit .262 with 12 home runs and 43 runs batted in (RBIs).

In his ten-year major league career, Newcombe registered a record of 149–90, with 1,129 strikeouts and a 3.56 ERA, 136 complete games and 24 shutouts in 2,154 2/3 innings pitched. In addition to his pitching abilities, Newcombe was a dangerous hitter, hitting seven home runs in the 1955 season. He batted .271 (ninth-best average in history among pitchers), with 15 home runs, 108 RBIs, 238 hits, 33 doubles, three triples, 94 runs scored and 87 walks.

A historic marker was installed in Nashua, NH by the Black Heritage Trail of New Hampshire to celebrate the achievements of Newcombe and Roy Campanella in 2023.

== Life after retirement ==
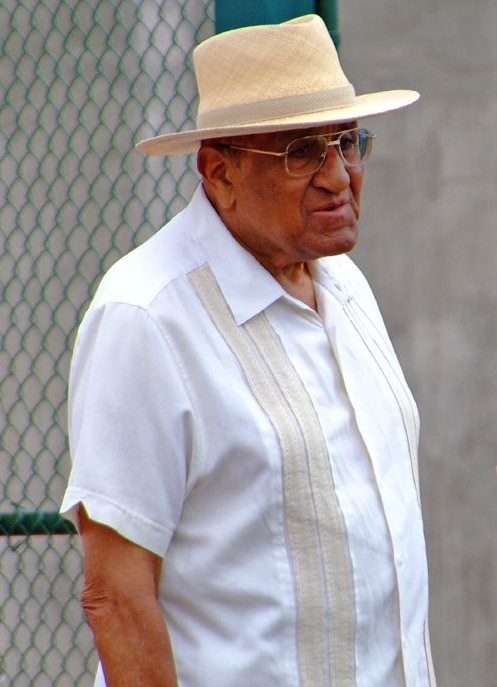
Newcombe in 2009

Newcombe rejoined the Dodger organization in the late 1970s and served as the team's director of community affairs. In March 2009, he was named special adviser to the chairman of the team.

Newcombe was inducted into the Baseball Reliquary's Shrine of the Eternals in 2016 and into the initial class of "Legends of Dodger Baseball" in 2019.

== Personal life ==
Newcombe was married three times. His first wife was Freddie Green, whom he married in 1945 and divorced in 1960. They had 3 children, Evit, Gregory (died in 1998), and Robin (died in 2015). Evit resides in Florida. A week after his divorce from Green, he married Billie Roberts, a marriage which lasted until they divorced in 1994. Newcombe's third wife, Karen Kroner, survived him.

Newcombe dealt with alcoholism in the 1950s and 1960s, describing himself as "a stupefied, wife-abusing, child-frightening, falling-down drunk". His alcoholism became so severe that, in 1965, he pawned his World Series ring in order to afford alcohol. He quit drinking in 1966, when his wife threatened to leave him. In his personal and professional life, he helped numerous other people including military personnel and Dodgers teammate Maury Wills in their own battles against substance abuse.

At a fundraising event for Senator Barbara Boxer, President Barack Obama referred to Newcombe (who was attending the event) as "someone who helped... America become what it is.

I would not be here if it were not for Jackie and it were not for Don Newcombe.

- Barack Obama, April 19, 2010.

Newcombe died on the morning of February 19, 2019, at the age of 92, following a long illness. He is interred at the Los Angeles National Cemetery in Los Angeles.

== See also ==
- Black Aces, African-American pitchers with a 20-win MLB season
- List of first black Major League Baseball players
- List of Major League Baseball annual strikeout leaders
- List of Major League Baseball annual wins leaders
- List of Major League Baseball all-time leaders in home runs by pitchers
- List of Negro league baseball players who played in Major League Baseball

Awards and achievements
Preceded by Joe Hatten; Carl Erskine	Brooklyn Dodgers Opening Day; Starting pitcher 1950; 1956–1957	Succeeded by Carl Erskine; Don Drysdale
