= Bill Merritt (catcher) =

American baseball player (1870–1937)

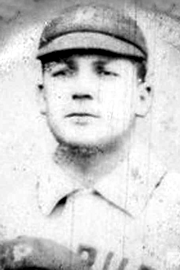
- Merritt with the Pittsburgh Pirates
- Catcher
- Born: July 30, 1870; Lowell, Massachusetts, U.S.
- Died: November 17, 1937 (aged 67); Lowell, Massachusetts, U.S.
- Batted: Right Threw: Right

MLB debut
- August 8, 1891, for the Chicago Colts

Last MLB appearance
- October 15, 1899, for the Boston Beaneaters

MLB statistics
- At bats: 1414
- Home runs: 8
- Runs batted in: 196
- Batting average: .272
- Stats at Baseball Reference

Teams
- Chicago Colts (1891); Louisville Colonels (1892); Boston Beaneaters (1893–1894); Pittsburgh Pirates (1894); Cincinnati Reds (1894–1895); Pittsburgh Pirates (1895–1897); Boston Beaneaters (1899)

William Henry Merritt (born July 30, 1870 – November 17, 1937) was an American Major League Baseball player who played catcher from 1891-1899. He would play for the Boston Beaneaters, Chicago Colts, Louisville Colonels, Pittsburgh Pirates, and Cincinnati Reds.

In 401 games over eight seasons, Merritt posted a .272 batting average (384-for-1414) with 182 runs, 8 home runs and 196 RBI. He finished his career with a .943 fielding percentage playing at least one game at every position except pitcher.
