= Claude Davidson =

American baseball player (1896–1956)

- Second baseman
- Born: October 13, 1896; Boston, Massachusetts, U.S.
- Died: April 18, 1956 (aged 59); Weymouth, Massachusetts, U.S.
- Batted: Left Threw: Right

MLB debut
- April 25, 1918, for the Philadelphia Athletics

Last MLB appearance
- September 4, 1919, for the Washington Senators

MLB statistics
- Batting average: .205
- Home runs: 0
- Runs batted in: 4
- Stats at Baseball Reference

Teams
- Philadelphia Athletics (1918); Washington Senators (1919)

Claude Boucher Davidson (October 13, 1896 – April 18, 1956) was an American Major League Baseball second baseman. He played for the Philadelphia Athletics during the 1918 season and the Washington Senators during the 1919 season.
