= Salem Witches (baseball) =

Former baseball team

The Salem Witches were a baseball team of the New England League, a minor league in American major league baseball. The team played a total of five non-consecutive seasons using the "Witches" moniker. Salem also hosted the New England League Salem Fairies (1887) and Salem (1891–1892), as well as Salem of the New England Association (1895). Salem first had a team in the 1884 Massachusetts State Association.

- Location: Lowell, Massachusetts; Salem, Massachusetts
- League: New England League 1888, 1926–1928, 1930
- Ballpark: Alumni Field, Donovan Park

== Year-by-year record ==
Year	Record	Finish	Manager	Notes
1888	36–34	--	John Tofani	Team disbanded August 3
1926	38–3	1st	--	Team from Lowell (6-8) moved to Salem June 3
1927	42–50	6th	Tom DeNoville	
1928	51–50	5th	Stuffy McInnis	
1930	21–9	1st	Sam Post	League disbanded June 22

== Rosters ==
Empty boxes indicate unknown values.

=== 1926 season ===
Player ▴	Bats	Throws	Birth Date	Height	Weight	Hometown
Beegan						
Edgar Bennett						
Bernard						
James Bodner						
Boucher						
Carroll						
Daniel Cashman						
Cornevale						
John Cox						
Thomas DeNoville						
Elmer Duggan		L	January 29, 1903			
Duncan						
Joe Dwyer	L	L	March 27, 1903	5'9"	186	Orange, NJ US
Robert Fransen						
Garrity						
Ernest Gourley						
Arthur Grant						
Hetherton						
Kennedy						
Leighton						
Leslie McCullough						
John McDonnell						
McWilliams						
Murray						
Newell						
Pouliot						
Bernard Preo						
Prushak						
Norman Sauvage						
Sigman						
Dante Sorenti						
Louis Strecker						
Arthur Thurston						
Walsh						
Ware						
Charles Weafer						
Wilson						

=== 1927 season ===
Player ▴	Bats	Throws	Birth Date	Height	Weight	Hometown
Maurice Bachand						
Joe Batchelder	R	L	July 11, 1898	5'7"	165	Wenham, MA US
Cassidy						
John Cox						
Thomas DeNoville						
Elmer Duggan		L	January 29, 1903			
Joe Dwyer	L	L	March 27, 1903	5'9"	186	Orange, NJ US
Robert Fransen						
Chick Gagnon	R	R	September 27, 1897	5'7"	158	Milbury, MA US
Ernest Gourley						
Lee						
MacGregor						
Edward McCormack						
John McDonnell						
Edward O'Connor						
Walter Oberc						
Myron Ruckstull						
Frank Schmidt						
Simmons						
Peter Stack	R	R	November 25, 1906	5'11"	168	
Bernie Starr						
Louis Strecker						
Thomas Sullivan						
Arthur Thurston						
Robert Unglaub						

=== 1928 season ===
Player ▴	Bats	Throws	Birth Date	Height	Weight	Hometown
Frankie Barciewicz						
Joe Batchelder	R	L	July 11, 1898	5'7"	165	Wenham, MA US
Blume						
Boerner						
Bogart						
Casey						
Joe Cicero	R	R	November 18, 1910	5'8"	167	Atlantic City, NJ US
Alexander Clement						
Cook						
Thomas DeNoville						
DeVinney						
Francis						
Robert Fransen						
Hansbury						
Harrington						
Paul Hinson	R	R	May 9, 1904	5'10"	150	Vanleer, TN US
Jones						
Lucas						
Martin						
Stuffy McInnis	R	R	September 19, 1890	5'9"	162	Gloucester, MA US
Murphy						
Edward O'Connor						
Roy Parmelee	R	R	April 25, 1907	6'1"	190	Lambertville, MI US
Roach						
Joseph Ruane						
Norman Sauvage						
Walter Simpson	R	R	February 4, 1900	6'1"	185	
Albert Spaulding	L					
Sterling						
Tarbert						
Turner						
Robert Unglaub						
Ellerton Urann			July 9, 1900			Massachusetts
Wichenback						

In later seasons, the rosters were unrecorded.

== Statistics ==
=== 1926 season ===
==== Pitching ====
Player	W	L	W%	ERA	G	GS	GF	CG	SHO	SV	IP	H	R	ER	HR	BB	IBB	SO	HBP	BK	WP	BF
Walsh	7	4	.636	4.97	26						143.0	168	100	79		58						
Louis Strecker	7	10	.412	3.47	19						158.0	145	71	61		47						
Ernest Gourley	3	2	.600		5						0.0											
John Cox	2	2	.500		7						0.0											
Pouliot	2	5	.286	5.44	11						48.0	65	43	29		23						
Leighton	1	0	1.000		2						0.0											
Garrity	0	1	.000		2						0.0											
Murray	0	1	.000		4						0.0											
Hetherton	0	1	.000		2						0.0											
Totals	22	26	.458	4.36	78	0	0	0	0	0	349.0	378	214	169	0	128	0	0	0	0	0	0

==== Batting ====
Player	GP	PA	AB	R	H	2B	3B	HR	RBI	SB	CS	BB	SO	BA	OBP	SLG	OPS	TB	DP	HBP	SH	SF	IBB
Joe Dwyer	88	350	350		129	17	5	8						.369	.369	.514	.883	180					
Thomas DeNoville	98	374	374		121	15	5	4						.324	.324	.422	.746	158					
John Cox	90	343	343		105	6	5	3						.306	.306	.379	.685	130					
Norman Sauvage	99	363	363		94	14	3	7						.259	.259	.372	.631	135					
Robert Fransen	70	268	268		87	9	4	4						.325	.325	.433	.757	116					
Arthur Grant	58	232	232		66	5	4	1						.284	.284	.353	.638	82					
Charles Weafer	29	107	107		30	3	1	2						.280	.280	.383	.664	41					
Leslie McCullough	21	74	74		24	3	0	2						.324	.324	.446	.770	33					
Prushak	32	108	108		20	4	1	1						.185	.185	.269	.454	29					
Louis Strecker	23	75	75		19	3	0	0						.253	.253	.293	.547	22					
Arthur Thurston	11	43	43		12	1	1	2						.279	.279	.488	.767	21					
Walsh	26	52	52		10	0	0	1						.192	.192	.250	.442	13					
Pouliot	11	18	18		4	0	0	0						.222	.222	.222	.444	4					
Totals	656	2407	2407	0	721	80	29	35	0	0	0	0	0	.300	.300	.400	.700	964	0	0	0	0	0

=== 1927 season ===
==== Pitching ====
Player ▴	W	L	W%	ERA	G	GS	GF	CG	SHO	SV	IP	H	R	ER	HR	BB	IBB	SO	HBP	BK	WP	BF
Joe Batchelder	3	7	.300	3.45	13						86.0	96	53	33		22						
John McDonnell	12	11	.522	2.70	30						207.0	180	100	62		117						
Simmons	11	11	.500	2.03	31						195.0	163	67	44		91						
Thomas Sullivan	4	10	.286	2.49	23						134.0	141	64	37		68						
Totals	30	39	.435	2.55	97	0	0	0	0	0	622.0	580	284	176	0	298	0	0	0	0	0	0

=== 1928 season ===
==== Pitching ====
Player	W	L	W%	ERA	G	GS	GF	CG	SHO	SV	IP	H	R	ER	HR	BB	IBB	SO	HBP	BK	WP	BF
Lucas	11	7	.611	3.54	27						160.0	136	87	63		76						
Roy Parmelee	10	18	.357	4.25	35						212.0	163	137	100		133						
Martin	6	6	.500	2.76	15						98.0	100	41	30		41						
Blume	6	7	.462	2.95	22						116.0	104	56	38		41						
Boerner	3	0	1.000		4						0.0											
Turner	1	5	.167	4.19	14						73.0	77	50	34		47						
DeVinney	0	1	.000		1						0.0											
Joe Batchelder	0	2	.000		6						0.0											
Totals	37	46	.446	3.62	124	0	0	0	0	0	659.0	580	371	265	0	338	0	0	0	0	0	0

==== Batting ====
Player	GP	PA	AB	R	H	2B	3B	HR	RBI	SB	CS	BB	SO	BA	OBP	SLG	OPS	TB	DP	HBP	SH	SF	IBB
Robert Unglaub	103	394	394		121	22	9	1						.307	.307	.416	.723	164					
Joe Cicero	93	309	309		88	7	7	2						.285	.285	.372	.657	115					
Robert Fransen	83	285	285		79	7	4	0						.277	.277	.330	.607	94					
Joseph Ruane	77	250	250		62	14	2	0						.248	.248	.320	.568	80					
Jones	72	201	201		51	6	7	1						.254	.254	.368	.622	74					
Roy Parmelee	65	179	179		48	9	3	2						.268	.268	.385	.654	69					
Stuffy McInnis	38	115	115		39	5	2	0						.339	.339	.417	.757	48					
Francis	34	112	112		29	5	1	0						.259	.259	.321	.580	36					
Edward O'Connor	35	121	121		29	8	3	1						.240	.240	.380	.620	46					
Tarbert	25	89	89		21	2	0	0						.236	.236	.258	.494	23					
Casey	23	66	66		17	3	0	0						.258	.258	.303	.561	20					
Wichenback	35	106	106		16	5	0	1						.151	.151	.226	.377	24					
Cook	30	63	63		13	0	0	0						.206	.206	.206	.413	13					
Hinson	12	44	44		10	0	1	0						.227	.227	.273	.500	12					
Turner	14	28	28		8	0	1	0						.286	.286	.357	.643	10					
Blume	24	41	41		8	0	0	0						.195	.195	.195	.390	8					
Lucas	27	54	54		7	1	1	0						.130	.130	.185	.315	10					
Hansbury	18	15	15		4	0	0	0						.267	.267	.267	.533	4					
Martin	15	31	31		3	0	0	0						.097	.097	.097	.194	3					
Totals	823	2503	2503	0	653	94	41	8	0	0	0	0	0	.261	.261	.341	.602	853	0	0	0	0	0
