= New England League =

American sports league in minor league baseball

- Most recent season or competition: 1949 New England League season
- Formerly: Eastern New England League (1885)
- Sport: Minor League Baseball
- Founded: 1885; 141 years ago
- First season: 1886; 140 years ago
- Folded: 1949; 77 years ago
- Country: United States
- Most titles: 6 Lowell Tigers

The New England League was a mid-level league in American minor league baseball that played intermittently in five of the six New England states (Vermont excepted) between 1886 and 1949. After 1901, it existed in the shadow of two Major League Baseball clubs in Boston and alongside stronger, higher-classification leagues.

In 1946, the NEL, the International League and the Canadian–American League – which all included farm teams of the Brooklyn Dodgers – were the first 20th century leagues (other than the Negro leagues) to permit African Americans to play. The following season, Jackie Robinson and Larry Doby would integrate the major leagues.

== Early history ==
In 1877 a non–classified league first called the "New England League" played with the Fall River Casscades, Lowell Ladies Men, Lynn Live Oaks, Manchester Reds and Rhode Islands as members.

The New England League was next called the Eastern New England League beginning play in 1885 with five teams in Massachusetts and Maine. The five teams, playing an 80 game season were, Lawrence, Haverhill, Biddleford/Newburyport, Portland and Brockton, with Lawrence winning the 1885 championship. The league continued play and shortened its name after the 1885 season.

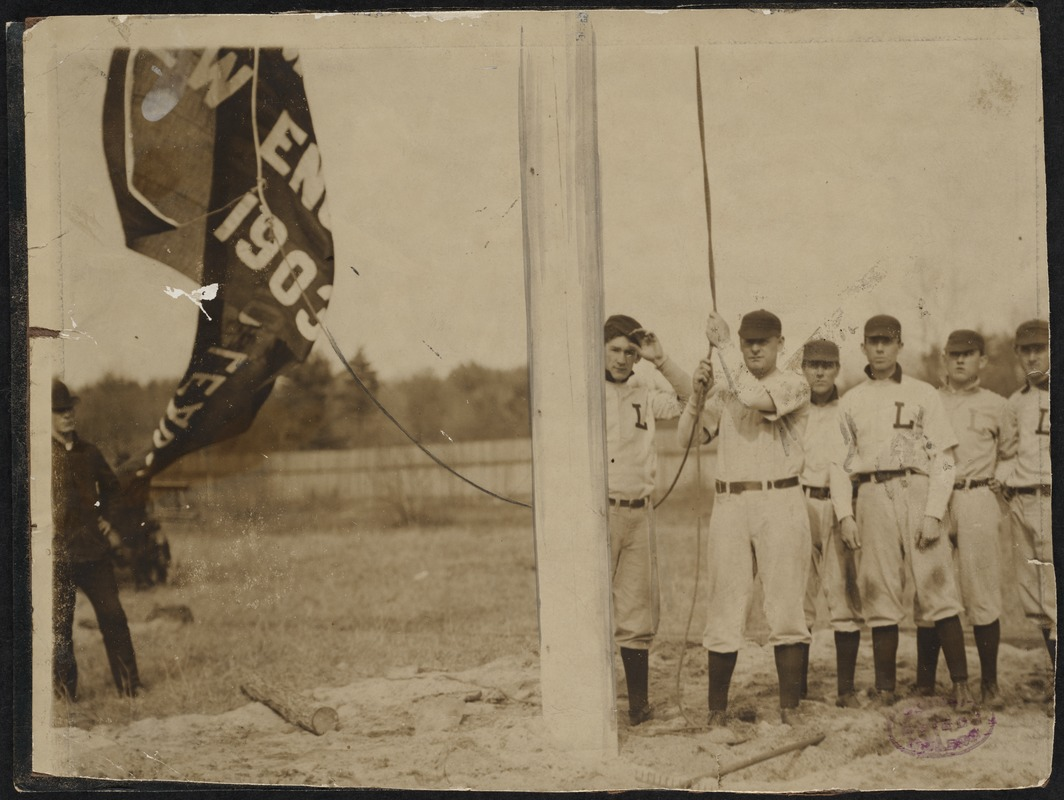
The winning team raising the 1903 pennant

The newly named "New England League" played its first game in 1886, with the same five Eastern New England League clubs in Massachusetts and Maine, plus the addition of the Boston Blues as the sixth team. The first New England League champion was the Portland club. The league was inactive in 1889–1890, then resumed play from 1891 to 1915 (with the exception of 1900) under the presidency of Tim Murnane, the Boston Globe sportswriter. When the minor leagues were assigned classifications in 1902, the NEL was graded Class B, at that time two levels below major league status, equivalent to Class AA today.

Disruption caused by the outlaw Federal League and the coming of World War I caused the loop to reorganize in 1916 as the Eastern League, ending the NEL's most long-lived period of operation. The league attempted to revive in 1919, then closed down in early August. Seven years later, the NEL returned in 1926 with eight clubs in the region's mill towns, but the Great Depression devastated the minor leagues, and the NEL was no exception: it disbanded June 22, 1930. A 1933 revival was followed the next season by a name change to the Northeastern League – and another shutdown that would last through the 1940 baseball season.

== Semi-pro league ==
The New England League was revived in May 1941 as a semi-professional league with eight franchises. Many players were in the military assigned to nearby bases, including some major league players (often playing under an assumed name). Football Hall of Famer, Major League umpire and NBA coach Hank Soar sometimes played for Pawtucket. Pawtucket's best pitcher in 1945 was once and future major league pitcher Randy Gumpert, pitching under the alias "Ralph Wilson".

The teams in 1941 were the New Bedford Whalers (which relocated to Cranston, Rhode Island on July 31), Pawtucket Slaters, Lynn Frasers, Worcester Nortons, Woonsocket Marquettes, Quincy Shipbuilders, Fall River, and Manchester (New Hampshire) Dexters. Pawtucket won the league title, defeating Lynn in a best-of-nine championship series.

1942 saw seven teams take the field. However, the Fitchburg Blue Sox dropped out early in the season, leaving six teams in the league, as Pawtucket, Lynn, Manchester, Worcester, Quincy and Woonsocket all returned from the prior year. Pawtucket dedicated Pawtucket Stadium (later called McCoy Stadium) on July 5 in a victory over Lynn. Pawtucket again won the championship in October when the best-of-seven series against Manchester was halted after five games due to poor weather. In the middle of the championship series, the Slaters hosted an exhibition game against the Boston Red Sox in front of over 9,000 fans.

By 1943, with the war, the League operated with just four teams. Pawtucket, Woonsocket and Quincy were back, joined by the Providence Frigates of Cranston.

Providence, which defeated Pawtucket for the championship in 1943, changed ballparks in 1944, moving from Cranston Stadium to Municipal Stadium in Central Falls, Rhode Island. Joining them were Pawtucket, Lynn, Woonsocket and Quincy. Lynn bested Pawtucket 3 games to 2 for the 1944 championship.

In 1945, Cranston returned to the fold joining Pawtucket and Lynn, the return of the Worcester Nortons and two new teams: the New London Diesels and the Lawrence, Massachusetts based Lawrence Millionaires. The Cranston Firesafes defeated Pawtucket for the championship, 4 games to 1.

From 1941 to 1945 the member teams regularly played exhibition matches against teams from other leagues. Major league teams, Negro league teams, famous barnstorming teams and military teams all found their way into New England League ballparks. For example, Pawtucket, with once and future major league players such as Danny MacFayden, Bob Whitcher, Ted Olson and Ed Murphy, hosted the Philadelphia Phillies, Boston Braves, New York Black Yankees, and in other years teams such as the Havana All-Stars, Boston Red Sox, New York Yankees, Boston Colored Giants, House of David and the Brooklyn Dodgers.

== Return to professional status ==
In 1946 with the postwar baseball boom, the New England League was restored to an "affiliated" eight–team Class B level circuit, but only half the teams had ties to a major league organization. Four of the six 1945 teams made the crossover: the Pawtucket Slaters (Boston Braves), Lynn Red Sox (Boston Red Sox), Cranston Chiefs (independent) and Lawrence Millionaires (independent). They were joined by the Manchester Giants (New York Giants), Nashua Dodgers (Brooklyn Dodgers) and two other independent teams: the Portland Gulls and Fall River Indians. Its most notable member, the Nashua Dodgers, was a Brooklyn farm club where, in 1946, African-American players and future Dodger greats Don Newcombe and Roy Campanella made their debuts as part of the handful of men who broke the baseball color line. The players succeeded on the field and were very complimentary in remarks about their Nashua experience in later years.

In 1947 the Cranston Chiefs had a working agreement with the Cincinnati Reds, and the Fall River Indians had the same arrangement with the Chicago White Sox. The still independent Lawrence Millionaires cancelled their home game against Pawtucket on July 14 and became the Lowell "Stars" the following day playing in Pawtucket, wearing the uniforms of a popular semi-pro team of the same name. A name-the-team contest never panned out, and the press began calling the team the Lowell Orphans; after August 18 they became a "road" team. Following the 1947 season the franchise was moved to Springfield as a farm team of the Chicago Cubs, and the Springfield Cubs became the only New England League team to survive the 1949 season, as one of the Cubs' two Class AAA team from 1950–1953.

Nashua was the most successful member of the postwar league, winning three consecutive playoff championships from 1946-48. But by the middle of 1949, it became clear that the New England League was not viable. The league began the season with eight teams, but the Providence Grays dropped out on June 20. In mid-July the New York Yankees announced they were withdrawing their support of the Manchester team, forcing the franchise to suspend operations. The unaffiliated teams in Lynn and Fall River then also announced they were suspending operations, and on July 20, 1949, the New England League closed out their "first half" with Nashua in first place, followed in order by the other surviving teams: Pawtucket, Portland and Springfield. The "second half" season of 38 games resumed with the four remaining teams and concluded with Pawtucket in first place, followed by Portland, Springfield and Nashua. Both halves combined shows Pawtucket as the best team some 10½ games above second-place Nashua. The Brooklyn Dodgers refused to allow Nashua to participate in any playoffs, wanting to pull the plug on the Nashua operation immediately, thus giving the Portland team a first-round bye in the playoffs, which saw Springfield defeat Pawtucket, 2 games to 0, then Portland taking Springfield in seven games. The league's final regular-season champ was the Pawtucket Slaters, a farm club of the Boston Braves, but the Portland Pilots, a Phillies affiliate, won the playoffs, thus bookending the championship earned by the Maine city's entry in the NEL's maiden season 63 years earlier.

== List of teams ==
- Attleboro, Massachusetts: Attleboro Burros (1928); Attleboro (1933)
- Augusta, Maine: Augusta Kennebecs (1895–1896); Augusta (1901)
- Bangor, Maine: Bangor Millionaires (1894–1896); Bangor (1901)
- Boston, Massachusetts: Boston Blues (1886–1887); Boston Reds (1893)
- Brockton, Massachusetts: Brockton (1886), (1892); Brockton Shoemakers (1893–1899, 1910–1913, 1928–1929); Brockton (1903); Brockton B's (1901); Brockton Tigers (1907–1909); Brockton Shoemakers (1933)
- Cambridge, Massachusetts: Cambridge (1899)
- Concord, New Hampshire: Concord Marines (1902–1905)
- Dover, New Hampshire: Dover (1893), (1902)
- Fall River, Massachusetts: Fall River Indians (1893–1898); Fall River Adopted Sons (1913); Fall River Brinies (1911–1912); Fall River Indians (1902–1910, 1946–1949)
- Fitchburg, Massachusetts: Fitchburg (1899); Fitchburg Burghers (1914–1915); Fitchburg Foxes (1919); Fitchburg Wanderers (1929)
- Gloucester, Massachusetts: Gloucester Hillies (1929)
- Haverhill, Massachusetts: Haverhill (1886–1887), (1894); Haverhill Hustlers (1901–1912, 1914); Haverhill Climbers (1919); Haverhill Hillies (1926–1929)
- Lawrence, Massachusetts: Lawrence/Salem (1887); Lawrence (1886, 1892, 1899): Lawrence Barristers (1911–1915); Lawrence Colts (1902–1910); Lawrence Barristers (1919); Lawrence Merry Macks (1926–1927); Lawrence Weavers (1933); Lawrence Millionaires (1946–1947)
- Lewiston, Maine: Lewiston-Auburn Gazettes (1892); Lewiston (1891, 1893–1896); Lewiston (1901); Lewiston Cupids (1914–1915); Lewiston Red Sox (1919); Lewiston–Auburn Twins (1919);Lewiston Twins (1926–1930);
- Lowell, Massachusetts: Lowell Chippies (1888); Lowell Magicians (1887); Lowell (1892–1893); Lowell Lowells (1891); Lowell Tigers (1901–1911); Lowell Grays (1912–1915, 1919); Lowell Highwaymen (1926); Lowell Millers (1929); Lowell Lauriers (1933); Lowell Orphans (1947)
- Lynn, Massachusetts: Lynn/Newburyport Clamdiggers (1886); Lynn Lions (1887); Lynn Shoemakers (1888); Lynn (1891); Lynn Fighters (1914); Lynn Live Oaks (1901); Lynn Leonardites (1911–1912); Lynn Pirates (1915); Lynn Shoemakers (1905–1910, 1913); Lynn Papooses (1926–1930); Lynn Red Sox (1946–1948); Lynn Tigers (1949)
- Manchester, New Hampshire: Manchester Farmers (1887); Manchester Maroons (1888); Manchester (1892–1893); Manchester Amoskeags (1891); Manchester Manchesters (1899); Manchester (1901–1905); Manchester Textiles (1906, 1914–1915); Manchester Blue Sox (1926–1930); Manchester Giants (1946–1947); Manchester Yankees (1948–1949)
- Nashua, New Hampshire: Nashua (1901–1905); Nashua Millionaires (1926–1927, 1929–1930); Nashua Millionaires (1933); Nashua Dodgers (1946–1949)
- New Bedford, Massachusetts: New Bedford Browns (1896); New Bedford Whalers (1895, 1897–1898, 1903–1913); New Bedford Millmen (1929); New Bedford Whalers (1933)
- Newport, Rhode Island: Newport Colts 1897–1899
- Pawtucket, Rhode Island: Pawtucket (1892); Pawtucket Maroons (1894–1896); Pawtucket Phenoms (1897); Pawtucket Tigers (1898); Pawtucket Colts (1899); Pawtucket Slaters (1946–1949)
- Portland, Maine: Portland (1886–1888); Portland (1891–1896, 1901); Portland Phenoms (1899); Portland Duffs (1913–1915); Portland Blue Sox (1919); Portland Eskimos (1926–1927);Portland Mariners (1928–1930); Portland Gulls (1946); Portland Pilots (1947–1949)
- Portsmouth, New Hampshire: Portsmouth Lillies (1888)
- Providence, Rhode Island: Providence Chiefs (1946–1947); Providence Grays (1948–1949)
- Quincy, Massachusetts: Quincy Shipbuilders (1933)
- Salem, Massachusetts: Salem Fairies (1887); Salem (1891–1892) Salem Witches (1888, 1926–1928, 1930)
- Springfield, Massachusetts: Springfield Cubs (1948–1949)
- Taunton, Massachusetts: Taunton Herrings (1897–1899); Taunton Tigers (1905); Taunton Blues (1933)
- Woonsocket, Rhode Island: Woonsocket (1891–1892, 1933)
- Worcester, Massachusetts: Worcester Grays (1888); Worcester (1891, 1894, 1898); Worcester Busters (1906–1915); Worcester Chiefs (1933)

== Standings & statistics ==
=== 1886 to 1888 ===
1886 New England League - schedule
President: Jacob C. Morse

Team standings	W	L	PCT	GB	Managers
Portland	66	36	.647	-	Harry Spence
Haverhill	59	38	.608	4½	Frank Selee / Fred Doe / John Irwin
Newburyport Clamdiggers / Lynn	53	52	.505	14½	Dan Shannon / Ed Flanagan / Fred Doe
Brockton	45	56	.455	20½	Bill McGunnigle / Jim Cudworth
Lawrence	42	55	.433	21½	Frank Cox
Boston Blues	35	63	.357	29	Tim Murnane / Walt Burnham

Newburyport (35-34) moved to Lynn August 14.

Player statistics
Player	Team	Stat	Tot	Player	Team	Stat	Tot
Tom McCarthy	Brockton	BA	.330	Tom Lovett	Newburyport/Lynn	W	32
Bobby Wheelock	Portland	Runs	93	Tom Lovett	Newburyport/Lynn	SO	300
Sam LaRocque	Newburyport/Lynn	Hits	134	Tom Lovett	Newburyport/Lynn	ERA	1.27
Guerdon Whiteley	Newburyport/Lynn	HR	11	Tom Lovett	Newburyport/Lynn	Pct	.756; 31-10
Ted Scheffler	Portland	HR	11	Tug Wilson	Newburyport/Lynn	HR	11
Mike Slattery	Haverhill	SB	63				

1887 New England League - schedule
President: Jacob C. Morse

Team Standings	W	L	PCT	GB	Managers
Lowell Browns	71	33	.683	-	Bill McGunnigle
Portland	68	36	.654	3	Harry Spence
Boston Blues / Haverhill	47	36	.566	13½	Walt Burnham
Manchester Farmers	55	46	.545	14½	Frank Leonard
Lawrence / Salem	45	50	.473	21½ 5	Pat Pettee / Henry Putnam
Lynn Lions	40	64	.384	31	George Brackett / Henry Murphy
Haverhill	15	41	.268	NA	Arthur Williams / Fred Doe
Salem Fairies	10	45	.181	NA	Wallace Fessenden / Ed Flanagan / Frank Murphy

Salem disbanded July 9; Haverhill disbanded July 11; Boston (35-18) moved to Haverhill July 11; Lawrence (29-34) moved to Salem July 26.

Player statistics
Player	Team	Stat	Tot	Player	Team	Stat	Tot
Hugh Duffy	Salem/Lowell	BA	.470	Henry Burns	Lowell	W	32
Wyman Andrus	Portland	Runs	165	Henry Burns	Lowell	SO	137
Wyman Andrus	Portland	Hits	233	Jim Devlin	Lynn	ERA	1.84
Ed Kennedy	Lowell	HR	15	Henry Burns	Lowell	Pct	.780; 32-9
Gil Hatfield	Portland	SB	141				

1888 New England League - schedule
President: Edward Chesney

Team standings	W	L	PCT	GB	Managers
Lowell Chippies	51	36	.573	-	Jim Cudworth
Worcester Grays	48	40	.545	3½	Walt Burnham
Manchester Maroons	47	50	.485	9	Jim Clinton / Herbert Clough
Lynn Lions	37	26	.587	NA	George Brackett
Salem Witches	36	34	.514	NA	Wallace Fessenden
Portsmouth Lillies	12	20	.375	NA	Frank Leonard
Portland	2	18	.200	NA	Henry Myers / David Mahoney

Portland disbanded June 9 and was replaced by Portsmouth July 20; Lynn disbanded July 20; Salem disbanded August 3.

Player statistics
Player	Team	Stat	Tot	Player	Team	Stat	Tot
Ted Scheffler	Manchester	BA	.375	Alex Ferson	Lynn/Manchester	W	25
Ted Scheffler	Manchester	Runs	107	Alex Ferson	Lynn/Manchester	ERA	1.10
Ed Kennedy	Lowell	Hits	121	Alex Ferson	Lynn/Manchester	Pct	.781; 25-7
Mark Polhemus	Lowell	HR	14	Henry Burns	Lowell	SO	224

=== 1946 to 1949 ===
1946 New England League - schedule
President: Claude Davidson

Team standings	W	L	PCT	GB	Managers
Lynn Red Sox	82	40	.672	-	Thomas Kennedy
Nashua Dodgers	80	41	.661	1½	Walter Alston
Manchester Giants	75	45	.625	6	Hal Gruber
Pawtucket Slaters	70	54	.565	13	Hughie Wise
Lawrence Millionaires	65	53	.551	15	George Kissell
Providence Chiefs	64	60	.516	19	Art Mahan
Fall River Indians	30	94	.242	53	Jack Burns
Portland Gulls	20	99	.168	60½	Rip Jordan

Playoffs: Lynn 3 games, Manchester 0. Nashua 3 games, Pawtucket 0; Finals: Nashua 4 games, Lynn 2.

Player statistics
Player	Team	Stat	Tot	Player	Team	Stat	Tot
Mo Mozzali	Manchester	BA	.356	Walker Cress	Lynn	W	19
Robert Sperry	Lynn	Runs	109	Walker Cress	Lynn	SO	174
Robert Sperry	Lynn	Hits	175	Walker Cress	Lynn	ERA	1.98
Mo Mozzali	Manchester	RBI	118	Walker Cress	Lynn	Pct	.864,19-3
Lucien Belanger	Lawrence	HR	22				

1947 New England League - schedule
President: Claude Davidson

Team standings	W	L	PCT	GB	Attend	Managers
Lynn Red Sox	86	38	.694	-	60,458	Mike Ryba
Nashua Dodgers	82	44	.651	5	70,813	Fats Dantonio
Manchester Giants	74	50	.597	12	48,877	Hal Gruber
Pawtucket Slaters	65	60	.597	21½	92,787	Pete Fox
Providence Chiefs	57	66	.403	28½	32.203	Buzz Boyle
Fall River Indians	49	76	.392	37½	57,468	Joe Holden
Portland Pilots	45	80	.360	41½	75,083	Del Bissonette
Lawrence Millionaires / Lowell Orphans	40	84	.323	46	32,582	George Kissell

Lawrence (29-38) moved to Lowell July 15
Playoffs: Manchester 3 games, Lynn 2. Nashua 3 games, Pawtucket 1; Finals: Nashua 4 games, Manchester 2.

Player statistics
Player	Team	Stat	Tot	Player	Team	Stat	Tot
Clifford Blake	Portland	BA	.343	Don Newcombe	Nashua	W	19
James Shirley	Lynn	Runs	109	Don Newcombe	Nashua	SO	186
Ralph Atkins	Lynn	Runs	109	Salvatore Frederico	Manchester	ERA	2.37
Clifford Blake	Portland	Hits	171	Neilan Smith	Lynn	Pct	.867,13-2
Bill Reardon	Pawtucket	SO	121				
Ralph Atkins	Lynn	HR	25				
Clifford Blake	Portland	RBI	109				

1948 New England League - schedule
President: Claude Davidson

Team standings	W	L	PCT	GB	Attend	Managers
Lynn Red Sox	85	40	.680	-	49,088	Eddie Popowski
Nashua Dodgers	84	41	.672	1	63,382	Al Campanis
Portland Pilots	78	47	.624	7	117,606	Del Bissonette
Pawtucket Slaters	61	64	.488	24	60,432	Hughie Wise
Manchester Yankees	58	68	.460	27½	50,664	Tom Padden
Springfield Cubs	52	74	.413	33½	95,406	Robert Peterson
Providence Grays	45	80	.360	40	28,170	Frank Archer / Donald Burke
Fall River Indians	38	87	.304	47	22,589	Frank Zubik / Luke Urban

Playoffs: Lynn 3 games, Portland 2. Nashua 3 games, Pawtucket 0; Finals: Nashua 4 games, Lynn 1.

Player statistics
Player	Team	Stat	Tot	Player	Team	Stat	Tot
Ted Bartz	Nashua	BA	.334	Dan Bankhead	Nashua	W	20
Ted Bartz	Nashua	Runs	115	Dan Bankhead	Nashua	SO	243
Ted Bartz	Nashua	Hits	167	Harry Schaeffer	Manchester	ERA	2.33
Dale Long	Lynn	RBI	119	Rollin Schuster	Lynn	Pct	.818,18-4
Jim Pokel	Portland	HR	30	Joe Tully	Lynn	Pct	.818,18-4

1949 New England League
President: Claude Davidson

Team standings	W	L	PCT	GB	Attend	Managers
Pawtucket Slaters	83	43	.659	-	68,767	Rip Collins / Dutch Dorman; Earl Browne
Nashua Dodgers	71	52	.577	10½	38,979	Greg Mulleavy
Portland Pilots	66	57	.537	15½	83,100	Skeeter Newsome
Springfield Cubs	57	64	.471	23½	102,387	Robert Peterson
Fall River Indians	27	42	.391	NA	18,191	Dick Porter
Manchester Yankees	28	44	.389	NA	30,391	Wally Berger
Lynn Tigers	29	47	.382	NA	12,882	Thomas Kennedy / Charles Webb
Providence Grays	18	30	.375	NA	7,305	Frankie Pytlak / Joseph Pullano

Providence disbanded June 20; Manchester, Lynn, and Fall River disbanded July 19.
Playoffs: Springfield 2 games, Pawtucket 0; Finals: Portland 4 games, Springfield 3.

Player statistics
Player	Team	Stat	Tot	Player	Team	Stat	Tot
Bob Montag	Pawtucket	BA	.423	Ralph Albers	Pawtucket	W	14
Bob Montag	Pawtucket	Runs	139	Wesley Carr	Springfield	SO	130
Bob Montag	Pawtucket	Hits	192	Marion Fricano	Nashua	ERA	1.48
George Crowe	Pawtucket	RBI	106	Don Liddle	Pawtucket	Pct	.846,11-2
Bob Montag	Pawtucket	HR	21				

== Baseball Hall of Fame alumni ==
- Jesse Burkett, 1906-1913 Worcester Busters
- Roy Campanella, 1946 Nashua Dodgers
- Roger Connor, 1897 Fall River Indians
- Hugh Duffy, 1887 Salem Fairies; 1887 Lowell Browns
- Billy Hamilton, 1888 Worcester Grays; 1902–1904, 1906–1908 Haverhill Hustlers; 1909–1910 Lynn Shoemakers
- Joe Kelley, 1891 Lowell Lowells
- Nap Lajoie, 1896 Fall River Indians
- Rabbit Maranville, 1910–1911 New Bedford Whalers
- Christy Mathewson, 1899 Taunton Herrings
- Frank Selee, 1886 Haverhill
