= Portland Pilots (minor league) =

Minor-league baseball team based in Portland, Maine

- Founded in 1946; Portland, Maine

Minor league affiliations
- Class: Class B (1946–1949)
- League: New England League (1946–1949)

Major league affiliations
- Team: Philadelphia Phillies (1948–1949)

Minor league titles
- League titles (1): 1949

Team data
- Name: Portland Pilots (1947–1949)
- Previous names: Portland Gulls (1946-1947)
- Ballpark: Fitzpatrick Stadium (1946–1949)

The Portland Pilots were a minor league baseball team in Portland, Maine, who played as members of the Class B level New England League from 1946 to 1949. First playing in 1946 as the Portland Gulls, the Pilots played through the 1949 season, when the New England League permanently folded. The Pilots were an affiliate of the Philadelphia Phillies in 1948 and 1949. The Portland Gulls and Portland Pilots team played home games at Portland Stadium. In 1949, the New England League's last season, the Pilots beat the Springfield Cubs to win the New England League's championship.

Preceding the Portland Pilots and Gulls, Portland, Maine had a long history of play in the New England League, beginning in 1886. The Pilots were preceded as members of the New England League by Portland (1886–1888, 1891–1896), the Portland Phenoms (1899), Portland (1901), Portland Duffs (1913–1915), Portland Blue Sox (1919), Portland Eskimos (1926–1927) and Portland Mariners (1928–1930).

Until the Portland Sea Dogs expanded into the minor league Eastern League as the Florida Marlins' AA affiliate, the Pilots were the last professional baseball team in Portland.

The Portland Sea Dogs were preceded in the Eastern League by the Portland Duffs (1916) and Portland Paramounts (1917).

== Year by year record ==
1946: 20–99–1

1947: 45–80

1948: 78–47

1949: 66-57 (league champions)

== Notable people ==
- Del Bissonette managed the squad from 1947 to 1948
- Skeeter Newsome managed the 1949 squad
