= Lynn Red Sox =

Defunct American baseball team

- 1946–1949; Lynn, Massachusetts

Minor league affiliations
- Class: Class B (1946–1949)
- League: New England League (1946–1949)

Major league affiliations
- Team: Detroit Tigers (1949); Boston Red Sox (1946–1948)

Team data
- Name: Lynn Tigers (1949); Lynn Red Sox (1946–1948)
- Ballpark: Fraser Field (1946–1949)

The Lynn Red Sox, based in Lynn, Massachusetts, were a Class B farm system affiliate of the Boston Red Sox from 1946 to 1949 in American minor league baseball. The club played at Fraser Field and was a member of the New England League (NEL). In 1949, the club was affiliated with the Detroit Tigers and was known as the Lynn Tigers.

== History ==
The Lynn Red Sox continued Lynn's long history of play in the New England League. The Red Sox were preceded in the New England League play by the Lynn Lions (1886-1888), Lynn Live Oaks (1901), Lynn Shoemakers (1905–1910, 1913), Lynn Leonardites (1911–1912), Lynn Fighters (1914), Lynn Pirates (1915), Lynn Pipers (1916) and Lynn Papooses (1926–1930). The New England League Lynn teams were preceded in minor league play by the 1877 Lynn Live Oaks, who played as members of the New England Association and the 1884 Lynn team of the Massachusetts State Association.

The Lynn Red Sox finished in first place during the regular seasons of 1946–47–48, but each year faltered during the playoffs, as the Nashua Dodgers won the NEL playoff championship for three consecutive seasons. Nashua was the first NEL team to break the baseball color line and, in 1946, ugly confrontations were reported between the Nashua and Lynn clubs. Future Brooklyn Dodger star starting pitcher Don Newcombe integrated the NEL in 1946, along with eventual Hall of Fame catcher Roy Campanella.

"I remember one game against the Lynn Red Sox", Newcombe recalled in 2007. "Their manager, ‘Pip’ Kennedy, was all over us, yelling all kinds of [racial] things at us, and Mr. [Buzzie] Bavasi [the Nashua general manager and future Dodger executive] got him into the office and said, ‘They can’t fight you, but I can. If you have any guts, you’ll say to me what you said to them.’ Of course, he didn't say a word."

In 1947, Lynn received an upgraded management team when future Bosox general manager Dick O'Connell took over the front office, and former Major League pitcher Mike Ryba became manager. After one season, Ryba was succeeded as pilot by Eddie Popowski in 1948.

But the Red Sox pulled out of Lynn after a 1948 season in which only 49,000 fans turned out at Fraser Field, despite another first-place ballclub. The Essex County city fielded a Detroit Tigers farm club—the Lynn Tigers—for the first three months of 1949 but withdrew from the league July 19. The NEL itself shut down at the end of the season.

== Year by year record ==
Year	Record	Finish	Attendance	Playoffs	Manager	Statistics
1946	82–40	1st	n/a	Lost to Nashua in finals	Lawrence 'Pip' Kennedy	link
1947	86–38	1st	60,458	Lost to Manchester in first round	Mike Ryba	link
1948	85–40	1st	49,088	Lost to Nashua in finals	Eddie Popowski	link

== See also ==
- Notable Lynn Red Sox players

== Sources ==
- Johnson, Lloyd, and Wolff, Miles, eds., The Encyclopedia of Minor League Baseball, 3d edition. Durham, North Carolina: Baseball America, 2007.
