= New England Association =

- Classification: Independent (1877, 1895)
- Sport: Minor League Baseball
- First season: 1877
- Folded: July 6, 1895
- President: J.C. Morse (1895)
- No. of teams: 10
- Country: United States of America
- Most titles: 1 Lowell Ladies Men (1877); Lawrence Indians (1895)
- Related competitions: New England League

The New England Association was an Independent level minor league baseball league that played in the 1877 season and briefly in the 1895 season. The league franchises were based in Rhode Island, Massachusetts and New Hampshire. The New England Association was an eight–team league in 1877 and a six–team league in 1895 and permanently folded after the partial 1895 season. The 1877 league was one of the earliest minor leagues.

Baseball Hall of Fame members Candy Cummings managed Lynn in the 1877 New England Association and Ned Hanlon played for the 1877 Fall River Casscades.

== History ==
Formed for the 1877 season, the New England Association began play on May 3, 1877, as an eight–team league, but ended the season reduced to four teams. The league was one of the earliest minor leagues. On August 27, 1877, Providence turned a triple play in a game against Lowell. The Lowell Ladies Men, with a 33–7 record, won the championship, finishing 4.0 games ahead of the second place Manchester Reds who finished with a 29–11 record. Lowell and Manchester were followed in the final standings by the Fall River Cascades (19–21) and Providence Rhode Islanders (11–29). Both Lowell and Fall River had also been members of the 1877 League Alliance agreement, and in one game on June 12, 1877, future Hall of Famer Pud Galvin pitched the International Association member Pittsburgh Alleghenies to a 3–2 win over Lowell. The Lynn Live Oaks (8–22), Fitchburg, Haverhill and Lawrence franchises all folded before the 1877 New England Association season ended on October 15, 1877. The New England Association folded after the 1877 season.

In November 1877, the Lowell Ladies Men defeated the major leagues' National League champion Boston Red Caps 9–4 in an exhibition contest.

The New England Association had two Baseball Hall of Fame members in the 1877 league. Hall of Fame inductee Candy Cummings managed the 1877 Lynn Live Oaks, while fellow Baseball Hall of Fame member Ned Hanlon played for the 1877 Fall River Casscades at age 19.

In 1895, the New England Association reformed as a six–team independent league under the direction of president J.C. Morse. The six franchises were Fitchburg, Haverhill, Lawrence Indians, Lowell, Nashua Rainmakers and Salem. On May 3, 1895, in a game at Nashua, Lawrence defeated Nashua 36–17. The Fitchburg and Haverhill franchises both disbanded on June 20, 1895. Salem moved to Haverhill on June 20, 1895. On May 21, 1895, William Regan of Salem threw the New England Association's only no-hitter against Fitchburg in a 6–0 victory. The New England Association permanently disbanded mid–season on July 8, 1895. At season's end, the Lawrence Indians won the New England Association championship with a 33–19 record, followed by the Nashua Rainmakers (27–21), Lowell (24–24) and Salem/Haverhill (20–28).

== New England Association franchises ==
Team name	City represented	Ballpark	Year(s) active
Fall River Cascades	Fall River, MA	Unknown	1877
Fitchburg	Fitchburg, MA	Fitchburg Driving Park	1877, 1895
Haverhill	Haverhill, MA	Athletic Park	1877, 1895
Lawrence Indians	Lawrence, MA	Glen Forest Park	1877, 1895
Lowell Ladies Men	Lowell, MA	Fair Grounds Field	1877, 1895
Lynn Live Oaks	Lynn, MA	Unknown	1877
Manchester Reds	Manchester, NH	Unknown	1877
Nashua Rainmakers	Nashua, NH	Kinsley Street Grounds	1895
Providence Rhode Islanders	Providence, RI	Unknown	1877
Salem	Salem, MA	Donovan Park	1895

== League standings ==
=== 1877 New England Association ===
Team standings	W	L	PCT	GB	Managers
Lowell Ladies Men	33	7	.825	–	Josiah Butler
Manchester Reds	29	11	.725	4	H. S. Clark
Fall River Cascades	19	21	.475	14	Jim Mutrie
Providence Rhode Islanders	11	29	.275	22	C. R. Dennis
Lynn Live Oaks	8	22	.267	NA	Candy Cummings
Fitchburg	NA	NA	NA	NA	NA
Haverhill	NA	NA	NA	NA	NA
Lawrence Indians	NA	NA	NA	NA	NA

=== 1895 New England Association ===
Team Standings	W	L	PCT	GB	Managers
Lawrence Indians	31	19	.620	–	John Irwin
Nashua Rainmakers	27	21	.563	3	Edward Norton
Lowell	24	24	.500	6	Mike Mahoney / William Meade
Salem / Haverhill	20	28	.417	10	Frank Leonard
Fitchburg	12	25	.324	NA	Lawrence Thyne
Haverhill	12	26	.316	NA	William Dwyer / William Laverty

== Notable alumni ==
- Candy Cummings (1877) Baseball Hall of Fame, Inducted 1939
- Ned Hanlon (1877) Baseball Hall of Fame, Inducted, 1980
