= Portland Duffs =

- 1913–1917; (1913–1917, 1919, 1926–1930); Portland, Maine

Minor league affiliations
- Class: Class B (1913–1917, 1919, 1926–1930)
- League: New England League (1913–1915); Eastern League (1916–1917); New England League (1919, 1926–1930)

Major league affiliations
- Team: None

Minor league titles
- League titles (1): 1915
- Wild card berths (1): 1927

Team data
- Name: Portland Duffs (1913–1917); Portland Blue Sox (1919); Portland Eskimos (1926–1927); Portland Mariners (1928–1930)
- Ballpark: Bayside Park (1913–1917, 1919, 1926–1930)

The Portland Duffs were a minor league baseball team based in Portland, Maine. From 1913 to 1915, the Portland "Duffs" played as members of the Class B level New England League, winning the 1915 league championship.

The Duffs were named after their owner/manager, Baseball Hall of Fame member Hugh Duffy. After the New England league folded following the 1915 season, the Duffs played the 1916 and 1917 seasons in the Eastern League. Portland returned to New England League membership for the 1919 and 1926 to 1930 seasons, with Boston Red Sox Hall of Fame member Duffy Lewis managing the team for three seasons.

The Portland teams hosted home New England League and Eastern League minor league games at Bayside Park. The ballpark was built for the 1913 season after Hugh Duffy founded the New England League team.

The Portland Duffs teams were preceded in minor league play by 1908 Portland Blue Sox who played in the final season of the Maine State League.

== History ==
=== Early Portland teams ===
Minor league baseball began in Portland, Maine when the 1885 Portland team placed fourth in the Eastern New England League, which folded after one season.

The Duffs were immediately preceded in minor league play by the Portland Blue Sox, who played briefly in the 1908 Atlantic Association before the league folded after beginning league play. After the Atlantic League folded, the Blue Sox immediately joined the Maine State League, where they won the league championship in the final season of the league.

=== 1913 to 1915: New England League ===
The Portland "Duffs" became members of the 1913 eight-team Class B level New England League, with Portland replacing the Haverhill Hustlers franchise in the league. The returning Brockton Shoemakers, Fall River Adopted Sons, Lawrence Barristers, Lowell Grays, Lynn Shoemakers, New Bedford Whalers and Worcester Busters teams joined with Portland in beginning league play on April 30, 1913.

The Portland team was known as "Duffs," named after their owner and manager Hugh Duffy, who was a Baseball Hall of Fame player for the Boston Red Sox. Duffy still holds the major league record for the highest batting average in a season, hitting .440 in 1894.

On May 18, 1913, the Portland "Duffs" played their first home game on opening day. Playing in front of a large crowd at the newly built Bayside Park, Portland lost their opener to the Lowell Grays by the score of 17–9.

Hugh Duffy became manager in Portland, founding and owning the New England League team. The Lowell Grays were league champions with an 81–45 record, as Portland followed playing under their namesake Hugh Duffy. The Duffs finished 7.0 games behind the first place Grays in the final standings. Portland opened a new ballpark in 1913. Portland finished 2.5 games ahead of the third place Worcester Busters, who were managed by another Baseball Hall of Fame member, Jesse Burkettl.

The 1914 Portland Duffs finished in third place in continuing New England League play under owner/manager Hugh Duffy. Lowell was unable to defend their league championship, as the Lawrence Barristers won the 1914 New England League championship. The Portland Duffs had a 70–48 record to finish in third place in the Class B league's final standings. Portland finished 11.5 games behind Lawrence in the eight–team league and were also behind second place Worcester managed again by Jesse Burkett. Portland's Joseph Burns led the New England with 99 runs scored.

Portland native Rip Jordan pitched for his hometown Duffs in 1914. Jordan had a record of 11–6 with Portland. On September 27, 1919, Jordan started for the Washington Senators against the Boston Red Sox. Boston pitcher/outfielder Babe Ruth set a Major League Baseball record that year in hitting 29 home runs, and the last one came off of Jordan in the September 27 contest.

The Portland Duffs played their third season under manager Hugh Duffy and won the 1915 league championship in the eight-team New England League. The Duffs finished with a final record 77–42, placing first in the final standings as Hugh Duffy led the franchise to the league championship. The Duffs finished 13.5 games ahead of the second place Lawrence Barristers, winning the first place position in the league standings by a substantial margin. Clem Clemens of Portland led the New England League in scoring 88 runs, while teammate Taylor Farrell led the league with 135 total hits. Portland pitcher Forrest More led the New England League with 18 wins and George Martin had a perfect 10–0 record. After the 1915 season, the Class D New England League folded.

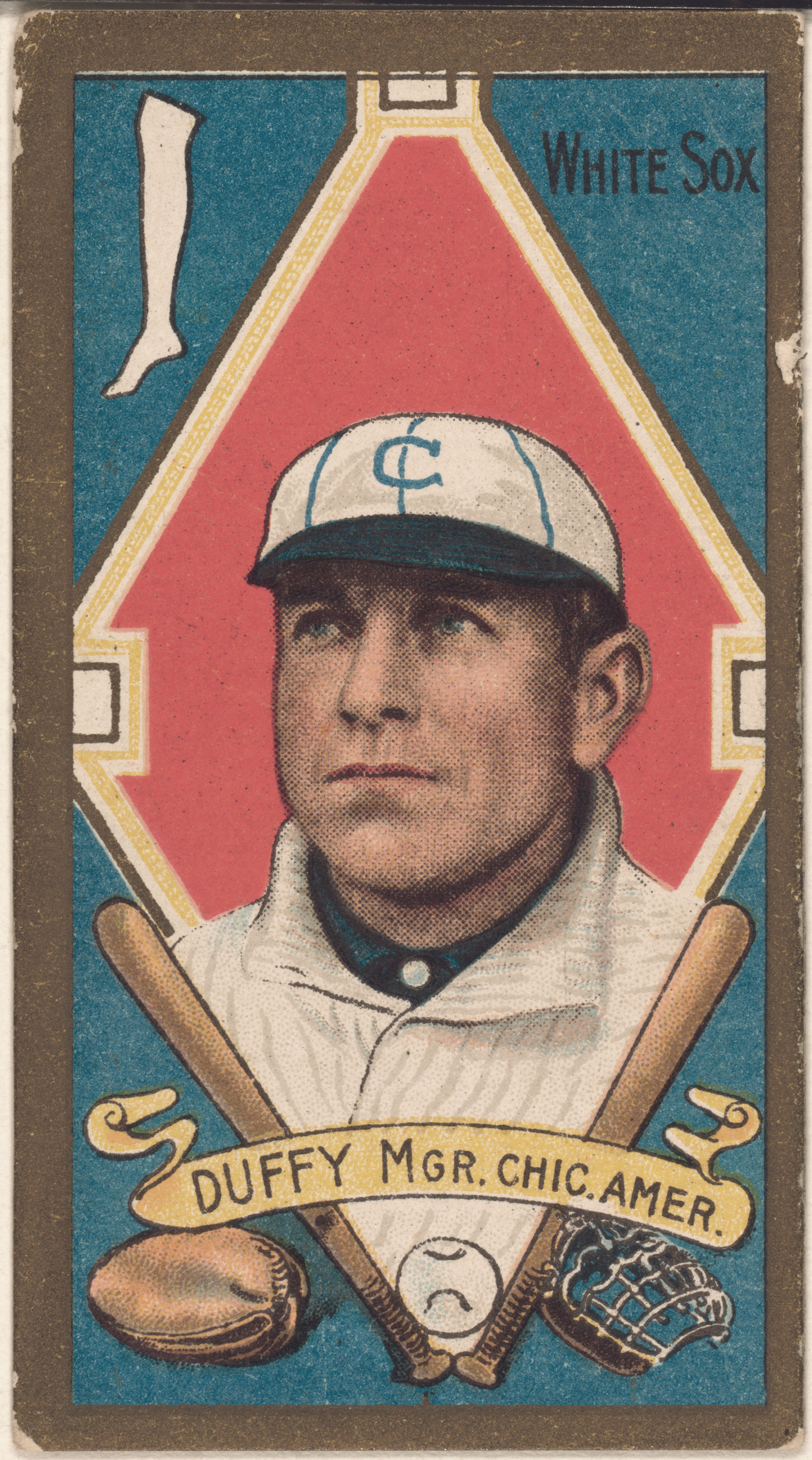
(1911) Baseball Hall of Fame member Hugh Duffy, Chicago White Sox, baseball card. Duffy was the namesake of the Portland "Duffs" and was the owner/manager of the 1913 to 1916 Portland teams.

=== 1916 to 1917: Eastern League ===
When New England League president Tim Murnane, a longtime friend of Hugh Duffy, reorganized the New England League into the new Eastern League, Duffy and his Portland team continued play in the newly named league.

In 1916, the Duffs continued play as members of a newly named Eastern League as the New England League changed names. Portland became members of the eight-team Class B level Eastern League. The Bridgeport Hustlers, Hartford Senators, Lawrence Barristers, Lowell Grays, New Haven Merlins, New London Planters and Worcester Busters teams joined Portland in beginning league play on April 20, 1916.

Alex Gaston was a catcher while playing for Portland in 1916. Alex Gaston went on to have a lengthy major league career. His brother Milt Gaston was his teammate and battery mate for the Boston Red Sox from 1929 to 1931.

Playing in the Eastern League, the Duffs ended of the 1916 season in second place. The Pprtland Duffs had a record of 81-37, playing their final season under manager Hugh Duffy. Lowell and Lawrence both folded on September 5, 1916, Portland finished 4.0 games behind first place New London. Portland's Richard Durning had 187 strikeouts to lead the league.

Following league president Tim Murnane’s unexpected death in February 1917, Hugh Duffy sold the Portland Eastern League franchise. Murnane and Duffy were longtime friends. After selling the Portland franchise, Duffy became the baseball coach at Harvard University.

Without Hugh Dufy, the Portland Duffs continued play in the 1917 Eastern League and ended the season in sixth place in the eight-team league, playing under a new manager. The 1917 team is also referred to as the "Paramounts." Portland ended their final Eastern League season with a 51-58 record playing the season under manager Mike Garrity. Portland finished 19.0 games behind first place New Haven. Robert Spald led the league with 168 strikeouts.

Portland did not return to the Eastern League as the league continued play in the 1918 season, but without a Portland franchise. The Portland Duffs were replaced by the Waterbury Nattatucks franchise in the eight-team 1918 Eastern League.

=== 1919, 1926 to 1930: New England League ===
After a one-season hiatus from hosting a minor league team, the Portland "Blue Sox" rejoined the reformed six-team Class B level New England league in 1919. It was their final season known as the "Blue Sox." The Fitchburg Foxes, Haverhill Climbers, Lawrence Barristers, Lewiston Red Sox and Lowell Grays teams joined Portland in beginning league play.

On July 14, 1919, Lowell had a 24–18 record when the team moved to become the Lewiston-Auburn Twins. The New England League folded on August 20, 1919 with the Twins in first place and Portland in second place. After their move, the Grays/Twins ended the season with an overall 38–25, finishing 2.0 games ahead of the second place Portland Blue Sox in winning a default championship. Portland ended the shortened season with a record of 38–27, playing the season under manager Heinie Wagner. Portland player Cy Morgan was leading the league with 97 strikeouts when the league folded, while teammate Ton Gallagher had a league best 9–2 record. Portland's Bob Bailey had 97 total hits, most in the league. The New England League did not return to play in 1920 Portland was without a minor league for the next six seasons.

After the New England League folded in 1919, Portland manager Heinie Wagner ended his playing career as the player-manager with the 1920 Norfolk Mary Janes of the Virginia League. After seven years out of professional baseball, Wagner was hired in 1928 as a coach for the Boston Red Sox under manager Bill Carrigan. In 1930, he was hired as manager of the Red Sox after Carrigan retired. On September 29, 1930, after one season, Wagner resigned as manager of the Red Sox, a resignation that was accepted by team president Bob Quinn.

After folding during the 1919 season, the New England League reformed as an eight-team Class B level league in 1926, with the Portland "Eskimos" as a member. The Portland Eskimos joined the Haverhill Hillies, Lawrence Merry Macks, Lewiston Twins, Lowell Highwaymen, Lynn Papooses, Manchester Blue Sox and Nashua Millionaires teams in beginning league play on May 11, 1926.

The Portland Eskimos began play in the newly formed league and finished in sixth place behind the Manchester Bue Sox, who won the 1926 New England League championship. Led by player/manager George Faulkner, the Eskimos finished the season with a 38–56 record to place sixth in the final standings, as Portland finished 20.0 games behind the first place Manchester Blue Sox team. No playoffs were held.

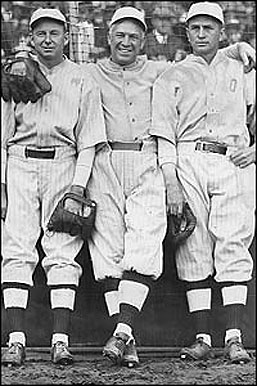
(1914) Duffy Lewis (left) with Hall of Fame teammates Tris Speaker, and Harry Hooper. Babe Ruth was their teammate on the Boston Red Sox. Lewis managed Portland from 1927 to 1929.

After finishing in sixth place the previous season, the 1927 Portland Eskimos finished second in the New England League standings and advanced to a playoff. As the league adopted a playoff format, Portland ended the regular season in second place with a 54–40 record in the eight-team league. Playing under new manager Duffy Lewis, Portland finished 7.5 games behind the first place Lynn Papooses and qualified for the final playoff series. In the playoff, Lynn swept Portland in four games to win the New England League championship. Portland pitcher Vic Fraser was a co-leader in the New England League with 15 wins. Teammate Ed Bogart scored 81 runs to top the New England League.

In his playing career, Portland manager Duffy Lewis was a member of the "Golden Outfield" of the Boston Red Sox of from 1910 through 1915. The outfield was considered one of the greatest outfields of all time. Duffy played left field, along with center fielder Tris Speaker, and right fielder Harry Hooper. With the three in the outfield, Boston won the 1912 and 1915 World Series. Speaker and Hooper, are members of the Baseball Hall of Fame. All three outfielders were noteworthy hitters and were also known for their exceptional fielding in the era. Famed baseball writer Grantland Rice said in the era that the Golden Outfield was "the greatest defensive outfield I ever saw...They were smart and fast. They covered every square inch of the park – and they were like three fine infielders on ground balls. They could move into another country, if the ball happened to fall there." Ty Cobb and former teammate Babe Ruth said that it was the best outfield that they had ever seen.

Leading the Portland Eskimos to the New England League finals, Duffy Lewis served as a player/manager in the 1927 season. Lewis retired as a player following the 1927 season, but remained as Portland's non-playing manager for the 1928 season.

The 1928 Portland team became known as the "Mariners" and the team continued Class B level New England League play under returning manager Duffy Lewis. Portland ended the season in last place in the eight-team league. With a final record of 39–64, Portland finished in eighth place in the regular season New England League standings, The first place Lynn Papooses ended the regular season a 56–44 overall regular season record, finishing 18.5 games ahead of eighth place Portland. Lynn won the second half of the split season schedule after the Attleboro Burros won the first half title. Portland did not qualify for the playoff, won by Lynn over Attleboro.

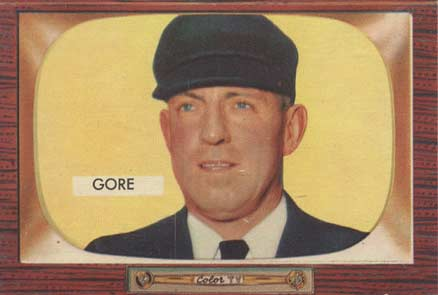
(1956) Artie Gore, Bowman baseball card. Gore played for Portland in 1928 before becoming a major league umpire.

Artie Gore played for Portland in 1928. Gore later became a major league umpire.Beginning his umpiring career in the minor leagues, Gore worked in the Can–Am League in 1937 and 1938, in the Eastern League from 1939 to 1942, and in the International League from 1942 to 1946. Becoming a major league umpire in 1947, Gore worked in the 1951 World Series and 1953 World Series. Gore also worked as an umpire in the 1949 Major League Baseball All-Star Game and the 1956 Major League Baseball All-Star Game, which was his final season as a major league umpire.

Duffy Lewis began the 1929 season managing Portland for a third consecutive season. After the season began, Duffy resigned as manager in June, citing poor health.

In 1929, the Portland Mariners improved on their eighth place finish the season before to end the season in fifth place. In the eight–team New England League regular season, Portland finished with a record of 61–64 and ended the regular season 19.0 games behind the first place Manchester Blue Sox (82–47) in the final standings. Portland was led by manager Duffy Lewis and his replacement, Henry Baldwin. The New England League held a final playoff, where Manchester defeated Lynn 4 games to 1. Rusty Saunders of Portland won the England League batting championship, hitting .399 while also topping the league with 145 RBI. Teammate August Snyder scored 115 runs to lead the league. Bernie McHugh, who split the season between Portland and Lynn, led the New England League with 19 home runs.

The Portland Mariners played their final season in 1930, as the six-team New England League folded during the season. The league struggled in 1930 as, the Lewiston Twins and Nashua Millionaires teams both disbanded on June 16, 1930. After continuing play briefly as a four–team league, the New England League folded on June 22, 1930. On the date the 1930 New England League folded, Portland ended their season with a record of 13–14 under manager Dick Rudolph. The Salem Witches were in first place with a 21–9 record, finishing 2.5 games ahead of the second place Lynn Papooses and 6.5 games ahead of third place Portland.

Manager Dick Rudolph had been a long-time major league pitcher. Rudolph had a stellar year pitching for the 1914 "Miracle Braves" team that saw Boston go from last place to first place in the National League in a span of two months. From July 4 to August 24, Rudolph won 12 straight games for the Boston Braves in leading their streak to the National League pennant. Overall, Rudolph had a 26–10 record with a 2.35 ERA in 42 games (36 starts), including 31 complete games and six shutouts while pitching 336 innings. The Braves then swept the Philadelphia Athletics in the 1914 World Series, becoming the first team to sweep the world series in four games, as Rudolph pitched complete-game victories in Games 1 and 4 of the world series. Rudolph played his last season in 1927, compiling a career record of 121–108 and a 2.66 ERA. After managing Portland, Rudolph later became the supervisor for Stevens Brothers Concessionaires at both Yankee Stadium and the Polo Grounds.

The New England League did not return to play in 1931 or 1932. The New England League reformed and played the 1933 season as a six-team league, but without Portland as a member. The league then folded after the 1933 season. The New England League returned to play beginning with the 1946 season with a Portland franchise rejoining the league.

After the Mariners, Portland next hosted minor league baseball when the 1946 Portland Gulls began a tenure of play as members of the reformed Class B level New England League.

Today, the Portland Sea Dogs continue minor league play as members of the Class AA level Eastern League, having joined the league in 1994.

== The ballpark ==
Beginning in 1913, Portland hosted minor league home games at the newly built Bayside Park.

Bayside Park was constructed in 1913 and served as home to the Portland minor league teams unlit 1930 season. The ballpark was built on fill. Bayside Park was located on the North side of Fox Street, between Boyd Street and Smith Street in Portland, Maine. Today's Kennedy Park corresponds with the former Bayside Park site location. In use as a public park with amenities, Kennedy Park is located 109 Fox Street in Portland, Maine.

Bayside Park hosted an exhibition game featuring Babe Ruth in 1921.

== Timeline ==
Year(s)	# Yrs.	Team	Level	League	Ballpark
1913-1915	3	Portland Duffs	Class B	New England League	Bayside Park
1916-1917	2	Portland Duffs	Class B	Eastern League	Bayside Park
1919	1	Portland Blue Sox	Class B	New England League	Bayside Park
1926-1927	2	Portland Eskimos	Class B	New England League	Bayside Park
1928-1930	3	Portland Mariners	Class B	New England League	Bayside Park

== Year–by–year records ==
Year	Record	Place	Manager	Playoffs/notes
1913	71–49	2nd	Hugh Duffy	No playoffs held
1914	70–48	3rd	Hugh Duffy	No playoffs held
1915	77–42	1st	Hugh Duffy	No playoffs held League champions
1916	81-37	2nd	Hugh Duffy	Team folded September 5
1917	51-58	6th	Mike Garrity	No playoffs held
1919	38–27	2nd	Heinie Wagner	League folded August 2
1926	38–56	7th	George Faulkner	Did not qualify
1927	54–40	2nd	Duffy Lewis	Lost in Final
1928	39–64	8th	Duffy Lewis	Did not qualify
1929	61–64	5th	Duffy Lewis / Henry Baldwin	Did not qualify
1930	13–14	3rd	Dick Rudolph	League disbanded June 22

== Notable alumni ==
- Hugh Duffy (1913–1916, MGR) Inducted Baseball Hall of Fame, 1945
- Henry Baldwin (1929, MGR)
- Desmond Beatty (1916)
- Frank Bennett (1927)
- Benny Bowcock (1913–1914)
- Tim Bowden (1915)
- Frank Brower (1917)
- Bill Brown (1915–1917)
- Frank Bushey (1928)
- Joseph Burns (1913–1915, 1917)
- Pep Deininger (1915–1917)
- Rich Durning (1916–1917)
- Pat French (1926)
- Cliff Garrison (1928)
- Alex Gaston (1916)
- Artie Gore (1928)
- Sid Graves (1928–1929)
- Don Heffner (1929)
- Merwin Jacobson (1913)
- Rip Jordan (1915)
- Pat Kilhullen (1916)
- Duffy Lewis (1927–1929, MGR) Boston Red Sox Hall of Fame
- Walter Lonergan (1914–1916)
- Harry Lord (1915–1917)
- Jeff McCleskey (1914)
- Bill Moore (1926)
- Ed Moyer (1915)
- Harry O'Donnell (1915–1917)
- Norman Plitt (1916–1917)
- Carl Ray (1928)
- Dick Rudolph (1930, MGR)
- Rusty Saunders (1929–1930)
- Duke Sedgwick (1927–1929)
- Steve Slayton (1929)
- Paul Speraw (1928)
- John Sullivan (1913)
- Oscar Tuero (1914)
- Heinie Wagner (1919, MGR)
- Bucky Walters (1930)
- Gil Whitehouse (1914)
- Rusty Yarnall (1927)

== See also ==
- Portland Duffs players
- Portland Mariners players
- Portland Eskimos players
