= 1869 in baseball =

The following are the baseball events of the year 1869 throughout the world.

== Champions ==
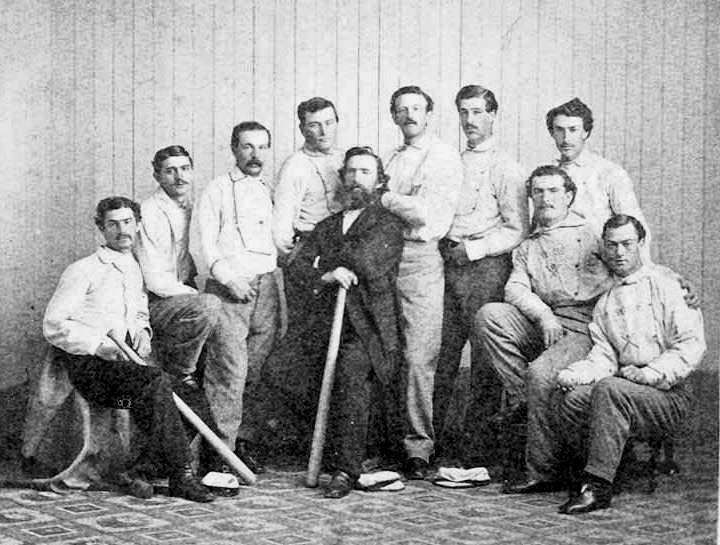
Atlantic of Brooklyn, 1869 champions

- National Association of Base Ball Players: Atlantic of Brooklyn

== Events ==
- March 19 – The first openly all-professional baseball club is formed as the Cincinnati Red Stockings. Major League Baseball considers this event to mark its foundation.
- May 4 – The Cincinnati Red Stockings debut as the sport's first openly all-professional team, defeating the Great Westerns 45–9.
- June 8 – An amateur club in Buffalo, New York called the Niagaras defeated another club called the Columbias 209–10 in the highest-scoring baseball game ever.
- June 15–17 – As part of their Eastern tour the Red Stockings defeat the Mutual of New York, Atlantic of Brooklyn, and Eckford of Brooklyn clubs 4–2, 32–10, and 34–5, respectively.
- July 3 – The Eckford of Brooklyn club defeats the defending champion Mutual of New York club for the second time this season by a score of 31–5. This puts the championship flag in the possession of the Eckfords under the current rules.
- August 16 – The Red Stockings win over the visiting Eckford club 45–18 at their own Union Grounds.
- Late September/Early October – Travelling west over the newly completed First transcontinental railroad, the Red Stockings play several games in San Francisco, winning all by lopsided scores.
- October 12 – The Chicago Base-Ball Association is founded. The association exists today as the Chicago Cubs.
- November 5 – The Red Stockings complete an undefeated season with their 60th victory in as many contests, defeating the visiting Mutual Green Stockings of New York 17–8 before 7,000 spectators.
- November 8 – For the second time since the Eckfords won the flag, they are defeated by the Atlantic of Brooklyn club. This gives the Atlantics the championship for the year by a 15–12 score.

== Professional matches ==
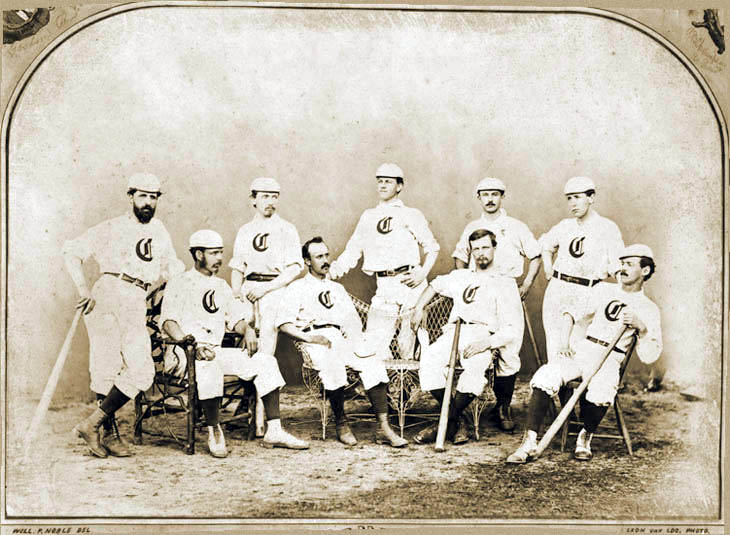
The Cincinnati Red Stockings, the first all-professional team

At its December 1868 meeting the NABBP permitted professional clubs for the first time. There had been no professional clubs outside the Association, and no brand new professional clubs were established for 1869. Rather, the entire first-year effect of the change was that twelve existing members declared professional status. All of them had fielded at least regionally strong teams in 1868 and most if not all had compensated at least some of their players. (Some compensation of players continued in the amateur field.)

The Cincinnati Red Stockings were first to sign an all-salary team, ten men for eight months. From the west, the strongest team in Cleveland also joined the pro field. From the eastern corridor there were ten including all of the one-time champions and claimants.

Cincinnati was unbeatable. Otherwise the record of professional matches (see table) is remarkable for its balance, relative to the records of the stronger teams during the amateur era and to most of the following pro seasons.

Club	W	L	T	Comment
Cincinnati	19	0		"Cincinnati Red Stockings"
Atlantic, Brooklyn	15	6	1	
Eckford, Brooklyn	15	8		
Athletic, Philadelphia	15	7		
Union, Lansingburgh	12	8	1	"Troy Haymakers"
Mutual, New York	11	15		
Olympic, Washington	9	12		
Maryland, Baltimore	7	14		
National, Washington	4	12		
Keystone, Philadelphia	3	17		
Forest City, Cleveland	1	6		
Irvington	0	8		in Greater New York

The Irvingtons did not travel, or win; after July they played only two matches with the Mutuals (four in all). Forest City of Cleveland did not travel far, only to Cincinnati and upstate New York. Those two did not face each other or any of the three teams standing just above them. That imbalance, typical of the time, contributed to the losing records of all five. Weaker teams were weaker gate attractions with less incentive and almost always less ability to travel.

The Irvingtons disbanded and the Keystones returned to amateur ranks, but all the others remained in the professional field for 1870. Indeed, all but Cincinnati remained in operation at least to 1872.

== Amateur clubs ==
The amateur ranks during 1869 probably included some clubs who compensated their players by traditional methods such as division of the gate receipts (as Spalding said of Rockford by the end of the decade). Four of the amateurs would "go pro" in 1870, including the Forest City of Rockford, Illinois, with some success.

The professional field was relatively strong in 1869 and its weaker teams did not play many games. The Forest Citys did not beat any pro teams, but they played only four matches with Cincinnati, losing three by twenty runs and one by merely 14–15 on July 24. (They traveled no further than Detroit and Ohio while eastern pros also traveled no further than Ohio, home of their westernmost rivals. Even so, the Forest Citys of Rockford and Cleveland did not get together.)

The Stars of Brooklyn, led by pitcher Candy Cummings, won 2 of 7 matches with pro teams, beating the Mutuals 26–12 on June 19 and the visiting Olympics of Washington 49–11 on July 19. They lost five to the Mutuals and Atlantics by only 28 runs, total margin. Harvard college won 1 of 6 against pros, beating the powerful Athletics of Philadelphia 35–21 on July 9; the next day they lost a close one to the much weaker Keystones. Against amateurs Star won fourteen with one defeat; Harvard won thirteen with one draw. Next season they would win six each against the slightly larger pro field.

Lowell of Boston, listed among the major teams by Bill Ryczek, played three fairly close game against the pros, losing 21–26 to the Mutuals, 9–29 to undefeated Red Stockings, and 33–38 to the Eckfords.

Pastime of Baltimore won 2 of 9 against pro teams, including 1 of 4 local matches Maryland and one with the Troy Haymakers. The Olympics, Mutuals, Athletics, and Keystones beat them four teams by only 32 runs, total margin. Resolute of Elizabeth, New Jersey beat Irvington 16–15 and lost twice to the Eckfords.

Their records against pro teams:

Forest City	0–4	Rockford
Pastime	2–7	Baltimore
Resolute	1–2	Elizabeth
Star	2–5	Brooklyn
Harvard	1–5	Cambridge
Lowell	0–3	Boston

These six amateur teams barely faced each other on the field: Lowell lost six to its local rival Harvard and one to Star (July 5, the Fourth being a Sunday that year). Harvard toured for ten days but played only the professional Eckfords in New York City.

== Births ==
=== January ===
- January [?] – Pat Luby
- January [?] – Doc Potts
- January 1 – Frank Connaughton
- January 1 – Kid Keenan
- January 4 – Tommy Corcoran
- January 12 – Nat Hudson
- January 13 – Jud Smith
- January 28 – Ducky Holmes

=== February ===
- February 6 – George Darby
- February 14 – Ace Stewart
- February 15 – Bill Fagan
- February 15 – Charlie Irwin

=== March ===
- March 6 – Hal Mauck
- March 8 – Jim Hughey
- March 9 – John McPherson
- March 9 – Frank Quinlan
- March 10 – Frank Bird
- March 11 – Harry Colliflower
- March 14 – Billy Rhines
- March 17 – George Hogreiver
- March 22 – Ed Fuller
- March 22 – George Bausewine
- March 24 – Al Lawson
- March 26 – Jack McCarthy
- March 27 – Toby Lyons
- March 27 – Bill Wynne

=== April ===
- April 2 – Hughie Jennings
- April 17 – John Grimes
- April 18 – George Borchers
- April 20 – Tommy Dowd
- April 20 – Sam Nicholl
- April 26 – Fritz Clausen

=== May ===
- May 8 – Tom Bannon
- May 22 – John Thornton
- May 23 – Algie McBride
- May 29 – Marty Honan
- May 30 – Tony Von Fricken

=== June ===
- June 1 – Ted Breitenstein
- June 1 – Bill Eagan
- June 1 – Les German
- June 2 – Tom Leahy
- June 5 – George Ulrich
- June 15 – Tom Hart
- June 24 – Kirtley Baker
- June 24 – John Weyhing

=== July ===
- July [?] – Phil Wisner
- July 2 – Walter Plock
- July 3 – George Cuppy
- July 10 – John Heydler

=== August ===
- August 4 – Mike Gaule
- August 13 – Jack Sharrott
- August 15 – Tom Morrison
- August 20 – Frank Bonner
- August 20 – Robert Gibson
- August 25 – Jack McFetridge
- August 31 – Monte Cross

=== September ===
- September 5 – Ed Stein
- September 11 – Frank Kitson
- September 14 – Kid Nichols
- September 21 – Jim Garry
- September 22 – Dummy Stephenson
- September 30 – Hal O'Hagan

=== October ===
- October 1 – Frank Motz
- October 1 – Huyler Westervelt
- October 2 – Scott Stratton
- October 7 – Frank Donnelly
- October 10 – Bill Moran
- October 11 – Alex McFarlan
- October 11 – Yale Murphy
- October 12 – Ed Householder
- October 12 – Malachi Kittridge
- October 15 – Jack McMahon
- October 18 – Frank Todd
- October 20 – William Stecher
- October 25 – Marty Hogan
- October 25 – Jack Doyle
- October 26 – John Gilroy
- October 27 – Chick Pedroes

=== November ===
- November [?] – Harry Morelock
- November 2 – George Sharrott
- November 4 – Mike Kilroy
- November 8 – Joe Peitz
- November 11 – Bert Abbey
- November 18 – Lou Johnson
- November 20 – Clark Griffith
- November 21 – Alex Beam
- November 21 – Billy Clingman

=== December ===
- December [?] – Dick Butler
- December 2 – Tom Stouch
- December 8 – Kid Camp
- December 20 – Bill McCauley
- December 21 – Joe Harrington
- December 23 – Mike Grady
- December 23 – Mike Roach
- December 24 – Zeke Wilson
- December 25 – Alex Jones

Date of birth missing

- Frank McGinn
- Bill Quarles
- Joe Wright
