= Waterville (baseball) =

- 1907; Waterville, Maine

Minor league affiliations
- Class: Class D (1907)
- League: Maine State League (1907)

Major league affiliations
- Team: None

Minor league titles
- League titles (0): None

Team data
- Name: Waterville (1907)
- Ballpark: Unknown (1907)

The Waterville team was a minor league baseball team based in Waterville, Maine. In 1907, the Waterville team played briefly as members of the Class D level Maine State League, before folding during the season.

== History ==
The 1907 Waterville team briefly played as members of the Maine State League, which reformed as an eight–team Class D level league. Waterford began play in the 1907 season alongside fellow members based in Augusta, Maine (Augusta Senators), Bangor, Maine (Bangor Cubs), Biddeford, Maine (Biddeford Orphans), Lewiston, Maine (Lewiston), Manchester, New Hampshire (Manchester), Portland, Maine (Pine Tree Capers) and a second team in Portland (Portland Blue Sox).

Waterville began play as the 1907 Maine State League season commenced on May 24, 1907. However, the Waterville team folded in June, with an 8–14 record, playing under manager George Boardman. The Manchester, Augusta and Lewiston teams folded shortly after Waterville.

In the final 1907 standings, the first place Bangor Cubs had a 47–31 record, followed by the Biddeford Orphans (30–27), Portland Blue Sox (39–41) and Pine Tree Capers (27–32) in the 1907 final standings. The Augusta Senators (27–28), Lewiston (24–23), Manchester (1–7) and Waterville (8–14) teams all folded before the completion of the season.

Waterville, Maine has not hosted another minor league team.

== The ballpark ==
The name of the Waterville home ballpark is not directly referenced. The facilities on the campus of Colby College were in use in the era. The college was founded in 1813.

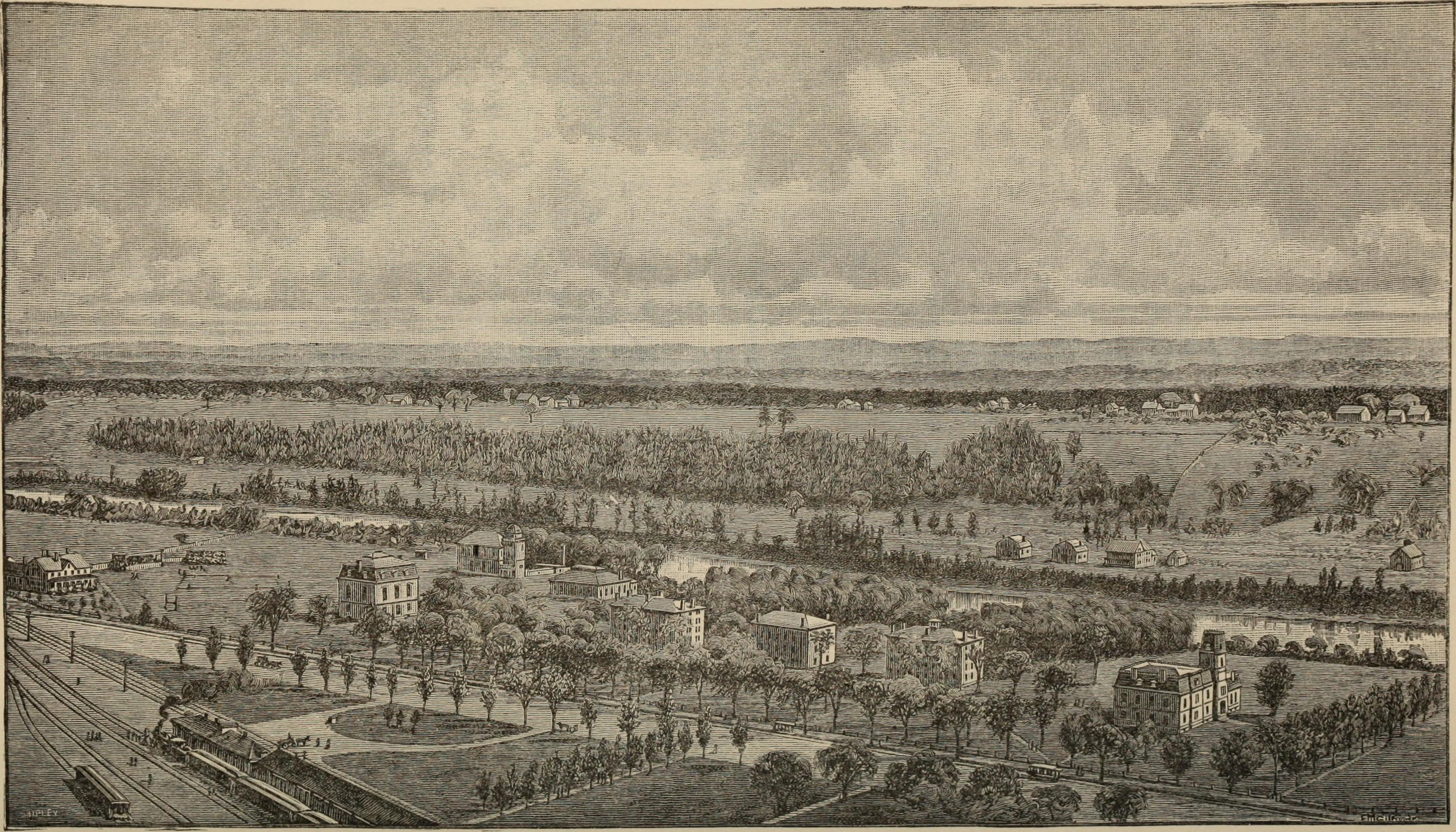
(1892) Colby College campus, ballpark at left. Waterville, Maine

== Year–by–year record ==
| Year | Record | Finish | Manager | Playoffs/Notes |
|---|---|---|---|---|
| 1907 | 8–14 | NA | George Boardman | Team folded in June |

== Notable alumni ==
No alumni of the 1907 Waterville team advanced to the major leagues.
