= Rockland (baseball) =

- 1884–1897; (1884, 1897); Rockland, Maine

Minor league affiliations
- Class: Independent (1884, 1897)
- League: Connecticut League (1884); Maine State League (1897)

Major league affiliations
- Team: None

Minor league titles
- League titles (0): None

Team data
- Name: Rockland Base Ball Club (1884); Rockland (1897)
- Ballpark: Unknown

The Rockland team was a minor league baseball team based in Rockland, Maine, In the 1884 and 1897 seasons, Rockland teams played as members of the 1884 Connecticut League and 1897 Maine State League. The 1897 team was the final minor league team based in Rockland.

== History ==
Rockland was home to early baseball, as the Rockland Base Ball Club played as members the 1884 Independent level Connecticut League.

In 1897, Rockland joined the Independent level Maine State League. The Maine State League briefly played in the 1897 season as a six–team league, beginning play on May 20, 1897. The Augusta Kennebecs, Bangor Millionaires, Belfast Pastimes, Lewiston and Portland teams joined Rockland in league play. During the season, the Augusta team disbanded on June 26, 1897 and the Rockland team disbanded on July 1, 1897. With the two teams disbanded, the league entire league folded on July 5, 1897.

Rockland had a 10–19 record in the 1897 season when the team folded. The Rockland team was sixth in the league standings when the team folded, positioned behind first place Portland. The 1897 final Maine State League standings featured Portland (21–6), Lewiston (15–14), Bangor Millionaires (12–19) and Belfast Pastimes (10–16) as the four remaining teams. The Augusta Kennebecs had a record of 14–8 and Rockland 10–19 when those teams folded.

The 1897 team was the last minor league team hosted in Rockland, Maine to date.

== The ballpark ==
The name of the home ballpark for the minor league Rockland teams is not known.

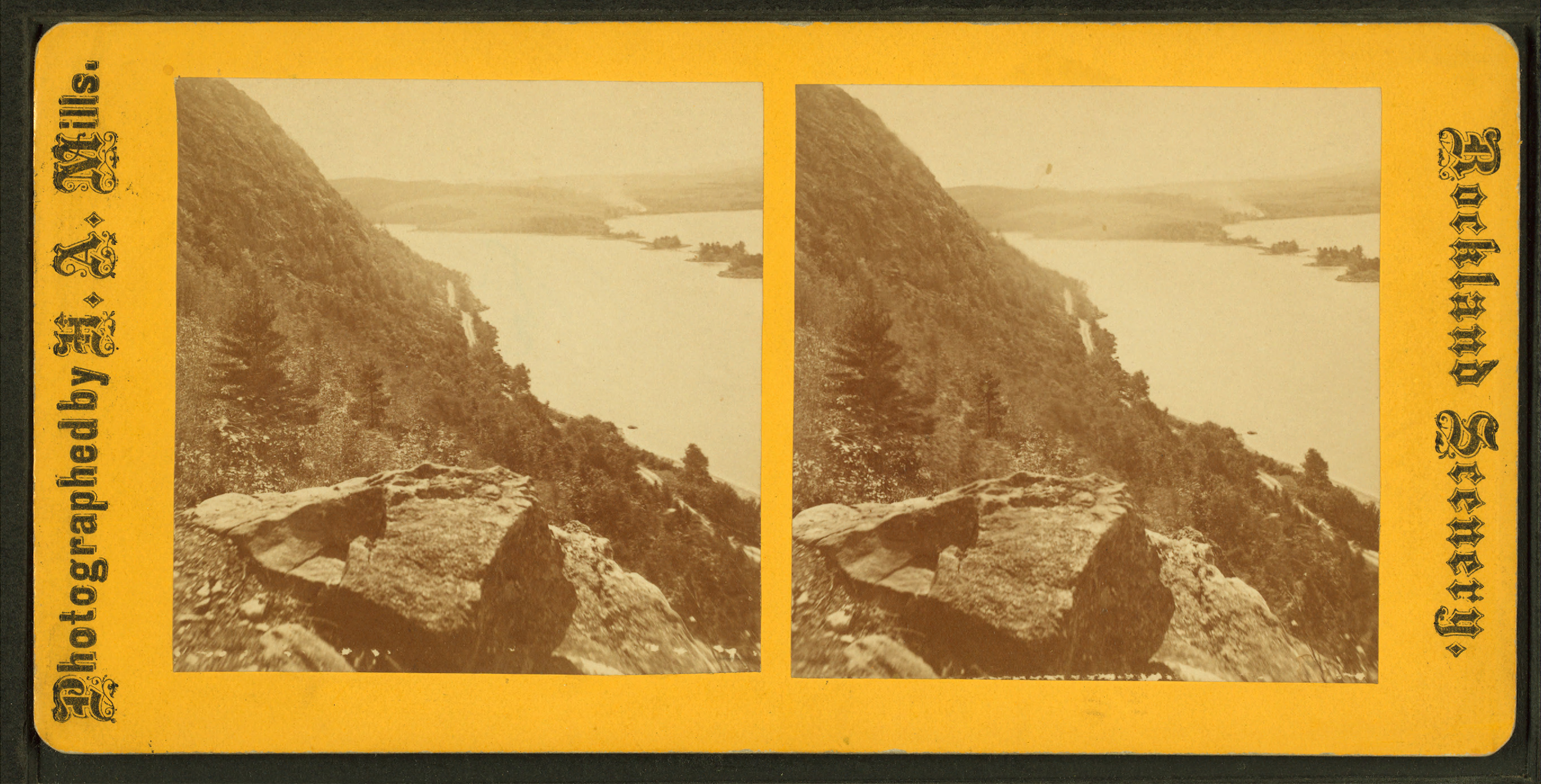
(1885) Rockland rocks. Rockland, Maine

== Year–by–year records ==
Year	Record	Finish	Manager	Playoffs/Notes
1884	00–00	NA	NA	League records unknown
1897	10–19	NA	NA	Team folded July 1 League folded July 5

== Notable alumni ==
- Ralph Miller (1897)
