= York Beach (baseball) =

- 1908; York Beach, Maine

Minor league affiliations
- Class: Class D
- League: Maine State League (1908)

Major league affiliations
- Team: None

Minor league titles
- League titles (0): None

Team data
- Name: York Beach (1908)
- Ballpark: St. Aspinquid Park* (1908)

The York Beach team was a minor league baseball team based in York Beach, Maine. In 1908, the York Beach team played briefly as members of the Class D level Maine State League before permanently folding during the season. The York Beach team was without a known moniker, common in the era.

== History ==
In 1908, York Beach became new members of the Class D level Maine State League, beginning league play in the six–team league. The Bangor White Sox, Biddeford Orphans, Lewiston, Pine Tree Capers and Portland Blue Sox were returning league franchises and joined the newly formed York Beach team to begin the 1908 season.

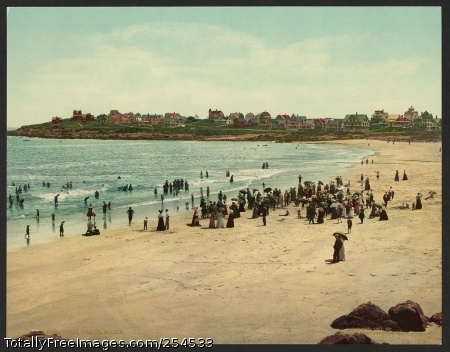
(1901) York Beach, Maine

York Beach began Maine State League began play on June 10, 1908. On July 19, 1908, both the York Beach and Pine Tree Capers teams disbanded during the season. York Beach had a 10–15 record when the team folded. When the Portland Blue Sox withdrew on August 28, 1908, it caused the four remaining Maine State League teams to fold. The Portland Blue Sox were in first place with a 32–20 record when disbanding. Portland finished ahead of the Bangor White Sox (31–22), Lewiston/Augusta (20–26) and Biddeford (18–30) in the standings. Pine Tree had a 15–13 record when folding and York Beach was 10–15. Since Portland had folded, Bangor was awarded the 1908 Maine State League Championship.

It was documented that George Grebenstein was a player on the York Beach team and served as "captain" of the team.

According to reports, the York Beach uniforms were green and brown.

York Beach, Maine has not hosted another minor league team.

== The ballpark ==
The name of the 1908 York Beach home ballpark is not directly referenced. However, St. Aspinquid Park in York Beach was in use for baseball in the era. The park was developed in 1898 by the Portsmouth, Kittery, & York Electric Railway and was located along the trolley line that existed in the era.

== Year–by–year record ==
Year	Record	Place	Manager	Playoffs/notes
1908	10–15	NA	NA	Team folded July 19; League disbanded August 28

== Notable alumni ==
- George Grebenstein (1908)
- Complete roster information for the 1908 York Beach team is unknown.
