= Bangor Blue Ox =

- 1996–1997; Orono, Maine

Minor league affiliations
- Class: Independent (1996–1997)
- League: Northeast League (1996–1997)

Minor league titles
- League titles: none

Team data
- Name: Bangor Blue Ox (1996–1997)
- Colors: Blue, black, gold, white
- Ballpark: Larry Mahaney Diamond

The Bangor Blue Ox were a minor league baseball team based in Bangor, Maine. The team played in the Northeast League (now the Can-Am League). The Northeast League was an independent baseball league and as such none of its teams had an affiliation with Major League Baseball. The team existed from 1996 to 1997 and played its home games at Larry Mahaney Diamond on the campus of the University of Maine in Orono, Maine.

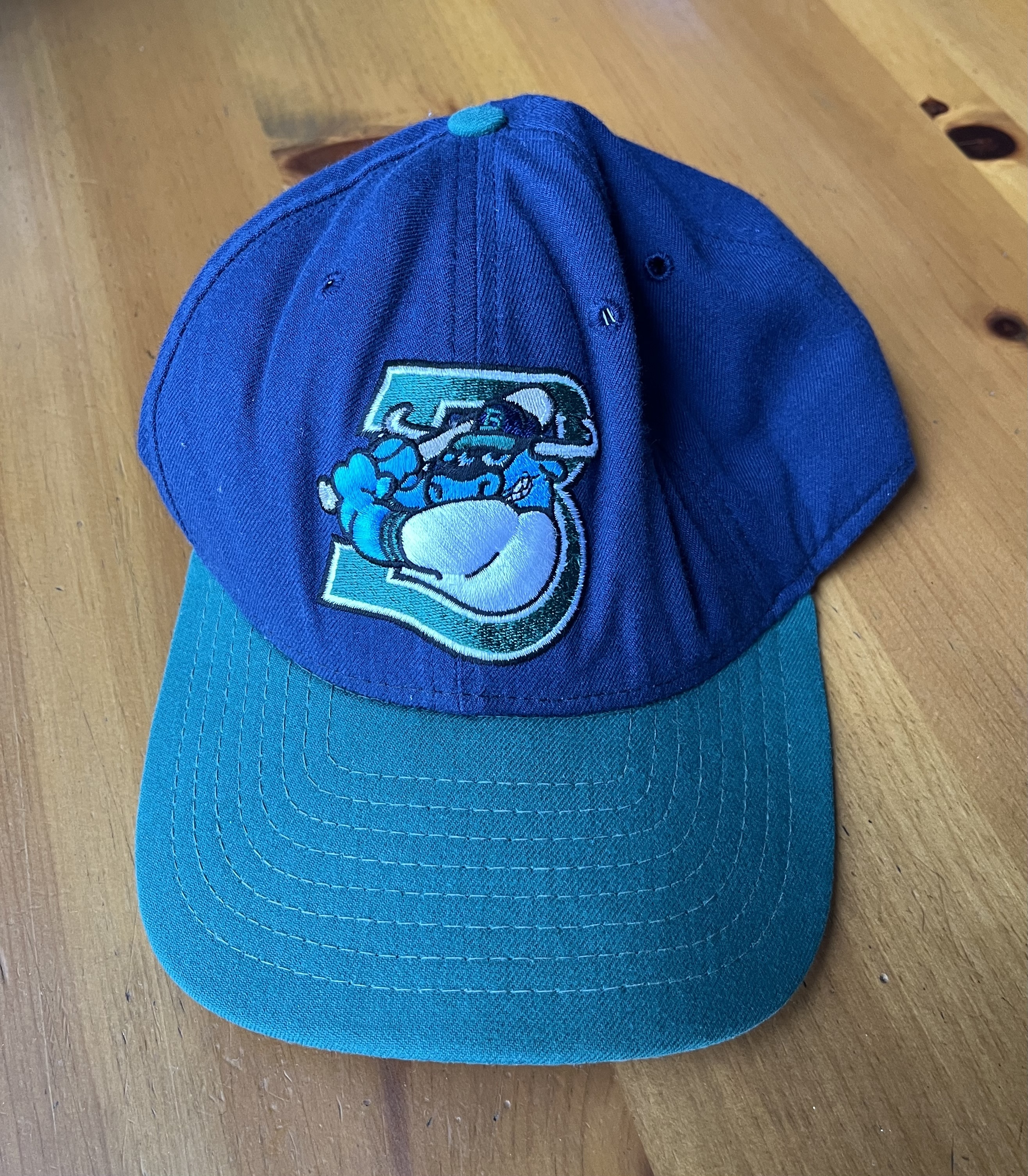
Bangor Blue Ox cap

== History ==
The Northeast League played its first season in 1995 with all six teams located in the State of New York; however, only three of these clubs would return for a second season. The NEL wanted to expand into New England and it chose West Warwick, Rhode Island and Bangor—which had not seen a pro baseball team in over 80 years—as two new teams for the 1996 season (also, Elmira was added to round the roster out to six teams again). The Blue Ox and the Northeast League had hoped that moving a team to the city would induce the city of Bangor to build a new ballpark for the team; in the meantime, the Ox would play their home games at Mahaney Diamond on the University of Maine campus in Orono.

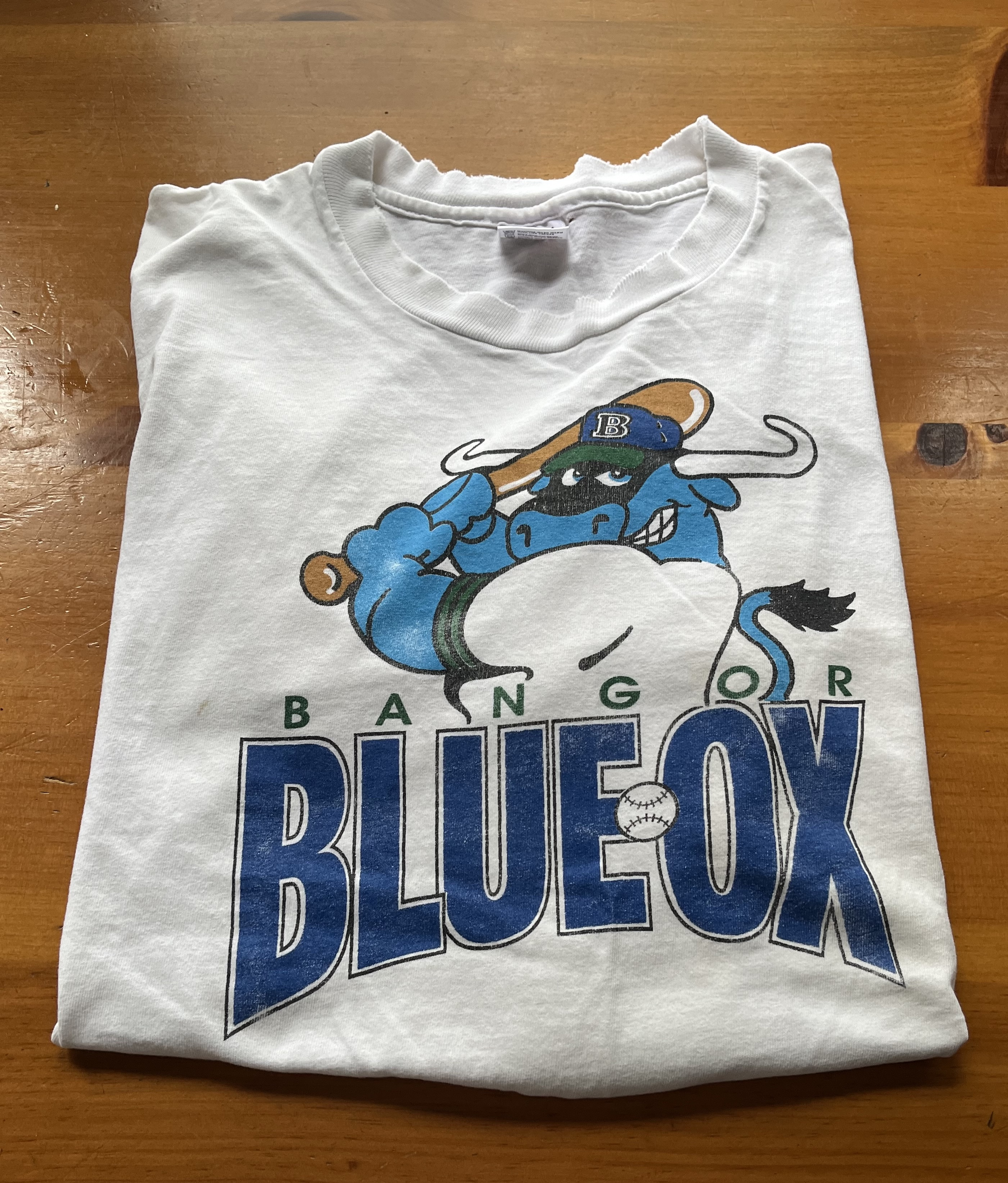

The Blue Ox would have a fairly successful season in their first year, finishing third with a 46-33 record. Bangor's starting rotation was led by former Major Leaguer Oil Can Boyd, who at age 36 was attempting a comeback. Boyd would finish the season at 10-0 with a 3.22 ERA, but ultimately would not return to the majors. They were more successful on the field than they were at the box office, though, drawing only 35,652 fans, barely 900 per game and next-to-last in the loop. In 1997, the Northeast League would take on the remnants of the failed North Atlantic League and expand to eight teams overall; the Blue Ox would finish the season at 40-43, sixth place. Attendance did not improve, with just 35,591 fans showing up, again next-to-last in the NEL. At the end of the 1997 season, it was clear that Bangor would not be building a new stadium anytime soon (as of 2021, the city still hasn't done so). Although Mahaney Diamond was a very suitable college baseball field, it was simply not designed to be a permanent minor-league park. The team was sold to new ownership and moved to Quebec City for the 1998 season; the franchise still exists as the Québec Capitales.

Other players with Major League experience included pitcher Mike Smith in 1996, (five seasons with the Reds, Pirates, and Expos), and in 1997 Fernando Ramsey (one season with the Cubs), outfielder Bob Zupcic (four seasons with the Red Sox and White Sox), pitcher Joe Grahe (seven seasons with the Angels, Rockies, and Phillies), and pitcher George Tsamis (one season with the Twins).

Each season featured a skipper who had played in the Major Leagues. In 1996, former infielder/outfielder Dick Phillips, who had already managed almost 1,500 minor league games in the Twins, Padres and Brewers systems before piloting Bangor, played four seasons in the early 1960s for the Giants and Senators. Managing the Blue Ox in their second and final season, former catcher/first baseman Roger LaFrancois had appeared in eight games in 1982 with the Red Sox.

== Bangor franchises timeline ==
Year(s)	# Yrs.	Team	Level	League
1894–1896	3	Bangor Millionaires	Class B	New England League
1897	1	Bangor Millionaires	Independent	Maine State League
1901	1	Bangor	Independent	New England League
1907	1	Bangor Cubs	Class D	Maine State League
1908	1	Bangor White Sox	Class D	Maine State League
1913	1	Bangor Maroons	Class D	New Brunswick-Maine League
1996–1997	3	Bangor Blue Ox	Independent	Northeast League
2003–2004	2	Bangor Lumberjacks	Independent	Northeast League
