= Belfast Pastimes =

- 1897; Belfast, Maine

Minor league affiliations
- Class: Independent (1897)
- League: Maine State League (1897)

Major league affiliations
- Team: None

Minor league titles
- League titles (0): None

Team data
- Name: Belfast Pastimes (1897)
- Ballpark: Unknown (1897)

The Belfast Pastimes were a minor league baseball team based in Belfast, Maine. In 1897, the Pastimes played as a member of the 1897 independent Maine State League before the league folded during the season.

The baseball terms "at bat", "on deck" and "in-the-hole" reportedly originated at Belfast Pastimes' games.

== History ==
In 1897, the Belfast Pastimes joined the Independent level Maine State League. The Maine State League briefly played in the 1897 season as a six–team league, beginning play on May 20, 1897. The teams joining Belfast in league play were the Augusta Kennebecs, Bangor Millionaires, Lewiston, Portland and Rockland.

After the Augusta team disbanded on June 26, 1897, and the Rockland team disbanded on July 1, 1897, the Maine State League folded on July 5, 1897. Belfast had a 10–16 record in the 1897 season when the Maine State League folded, playing under manager Louis Bacon. The Pastimes placed 4th in the league standings, finishing 10.5 games behind 1st place Portland. The 1897 final Maine State League standings featured Portland (21–6), Lewiston (15–14). Bangor Millionaires (12–19) and Belfast (10–16) as the four remaining teams. The Augusta Kennebecs had a record of 14–8 and Rockland 10–19 when those teams folded.

It is reported that the baseball terminology phrases "at bat", "on deck" and "in-the-hole" originated at Belfast Pastimes' home games.

The Pastimes were the final minor league hosted in Belfast, Maine.

Today, Belfast Pastimes artifacts are on display the Belfast Historical Society & Museum. The museum is located at 10 Market Street, Belfast, Maine.

== The ballpark ==
The name of the home minor league ballpark for the Belfast Pastimes is not known.

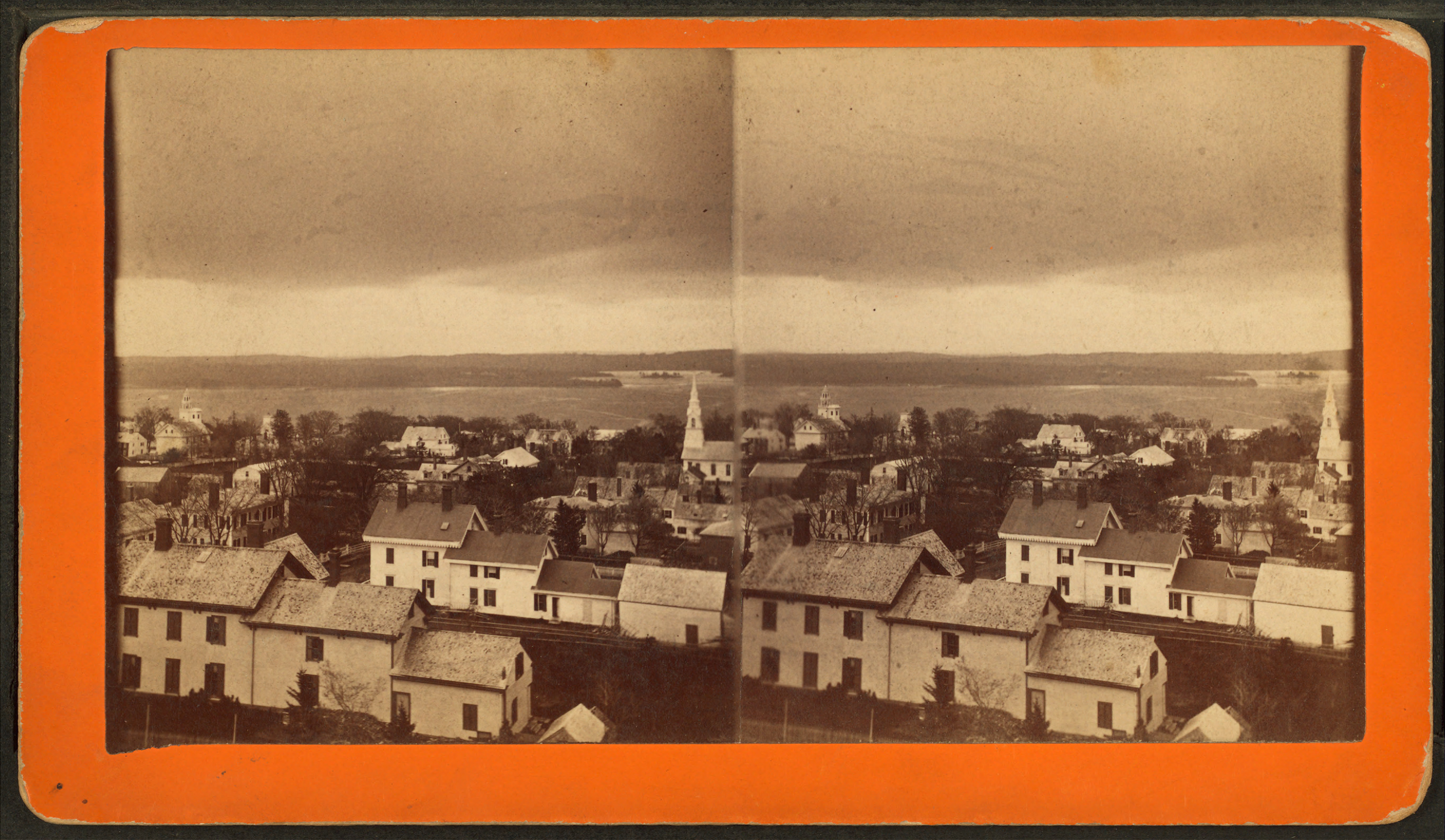
Belfast and Bay, 1886(?)

== Year–by–year record ==
Year	Record	Finish	Manager	Playoffs/Notes
1896	10–16	4th	Louis Bacon	League folded July 5

== Notable alumni ==
- Pete McBride (1897)
- Sandy McDermott (1897)
- Belfast Pastimes players
