= Lewiston Twins =

- 1926–1930; (1891–1897, 1901, 1907–1908, 1914–1915, 1919, 1926–1930); Lewiston, Maine

Minor league affiliations
- Class: Class B (1891–1896, 1901); Class D (1907–1908); Class B (1914–1915, 1919, 1926–1930)
- League: New England League (1891–1896, 1901); Maine State League (1907); Atlantic Association (1908); New England League (1914–1915, 1919, 1926–1930)

Major league affiliations
- Team: None

Minor league titles
- League titles (1): 1919

Team data
- Name: Lewiston (1891); Lewiston-Auburn Gazettes (1892); Lewiston (1893–1897, 1907–1908); Lewiston Cupids (1914–1915); Lewiston-Auburn Twins (1919); Lewiston Red Sox (1919); Lewiston Twins (1926–1930)
- Ballpark: A.A.A. Park (1901, 1907–1908, 1914–1915, 1919); Lewiston Athletic Park (1926–1930)

The Lewiston Twins were the final minor league baseball team based in Lewiston, Maine. Between 1891 and 1930, Lewiston teams played under various nicknames as long time members of the New England League (1891–1896, 1901, 1914–1915, 1919, 1926–1930) and also in the 1907 Maine State League and 1908 Atlantic Association, winning the 1919 league championship. Lewiston hosted home minor league games at A.A.A. Park from through 1919 and the Lewiston Athletic Park from 1926 to 1930.

Baseball Hall of Fame member Jesse Burkett managed the Lewiston Twins in 1928 and 1929.

On August 7, 1915, Lewiston pitchers Oscar Tuero and Otto Rettig threw back–to–back no-hitters in a double header against the Lowell Grays.

== History ==
=== Early teams 1891–1908 ===
Minor league baseball began in Lewiston, Maine in 1891. Lewiston fielded a team in the Class B level New England League, joining the league on June 10, 1891, and completing the season. Lewiston finished with an 11–28 record in their first season, playing under manager Jeremiah Scannell. Lewiston finished in eighth place in the eight–team league by winning percentage.

Continuing play in 1892, the team used the Lewiston-Auburn Gazettes moniker for one season, reflecting partnership with neighboring Auburn, Maine in the name. The Gazettes finished with a 53–45 record to place third in the eight–team New England League. Lewiston-Auburn finished 12.0 games behind first place Woonsocket, playing under managers Forrest Keay and Frank Leonard.

In 1893, Lewiston returned and had a 56–37 record in New England League play. Lewiston finished in second place, ending the season 5.5 games behind the 1first place Fall River Indians. The Lewiston manager in 1893 was John Leighton.

Lewiston finished in fifth place in the eight–team 1894 New England League final standings. Playing under returning manager John Leighton and Sam LaRocque, Lewiston ended the season with a record of 46–50, finishing 15.5 games behind the champion Fall River Indians.

In 1895 New England League play, Lewiston again finished in fifth place in the eight–team league. With a final record of 47–54, Lewiston finished 17.5 games behind the first place Fall River Indians in the final standings. Mike Slattery and Michael Garrity managed Lewiston in 1895.

The Lewiston team did not complete the 1896 New England League season. On August 12, 1896, Lewiston disbanded with a 29–53 record, playing the season under managers Michael Garrity, Ed Flanagan and Henry Slater. The league championship was won again by the Fall River Indians.

Lewiston returned to the New England League in 1901, beginning play at A.A.A. Park. Lewiston finished in fifth place with a 42–50 record. In the final standings, Lewiston was 13.0 games behind first place Portland. Lewiston played the 1901 season under manager Fred Doe.

In 1907, Lewiston returned to play in a new league before disbanding again. Lewiston became members of the Class D level Maine State League. The team disbanded on August 3, 1907, with a 24–23 record under managers George Boardman and Heald when the franchise folded.

Lewiston briefly played in the short–lived 1908 Class D level Atlantic Association. Lewiston was in second place with an 8–4 record under George Beede and Ed McDonough when the league folded on May 21, 1908. Lewiston was 0.5 behind the Portland Blue Sox when the league permanently folded. Other references have Lewiston in first place with a 6–3 record.

=== New England League 1914–1930 ===
Minor league baseball returned to Lewiston in 1914, with the Lewiston Cupids rejoining the New England League. The Cupids placed sixth in the eight–team, Class B level New England League. Lewiston had a final record of 57–66 and finished 27.0 games behind the Lawrence Barristers. Lewiston played the season under managers John McMahon, Joe Judge and Art McGovern.

On August 7, 1915, a baseball rarity occurred. Lewiston Cupid pitchers Oscar Tuero and Otto Rettig threw back–to–back no-hitters in a double header against the Lowell Grays. First, Tuero defeated the Grays 5–0 in a conventional 9–inning, complete game no–hitter. In the second game, Rettig no–hit Lowell over 5–innings in an official game that ended with a 1–1 tie.

Overall, the 1915 Lewiston Cupids placed fifth in the New England League final standings. The Cupids ended the season with a 50–59 record to place fifth in the eight–team league. Lewiston finished 22.0 games behind the first place Portland Duffs in the final standings. The Lewiston Cupids' manager and part–owner was Arthur Irwin. The New England league folded after the 1915 season, as did many minor leagues due to World War I.

The New England League reformed briefly for a partial 1919 season and Lewiston had two separate teams in the league. The Lewiston Red Sox began the season playing in the six-team league. The Red Sox had a 21–23 record under manager Freddy Parent when the team folded on July 20, 1919. On July 14, the Lowell Grays franchise moved to Lewiston and began play as the Lewiston-Auburn Twins, in partnership with neighboring Auburn, Maine, where Lewiston–Auburn are twin cities. On August 2, 1919, the Twins were in first place with a 38–25 overall record under manager Mike Hayden when the New England League folded.

In 1926, the New England League reformed as a Class B level league with eight teams. The Lewiston Twins began play, keeping the "Twins" moniker first adopted in 1919. The Lewiston Twins finished with a 50–43 record to place third in the final standings. Lewiston finished 7.5 games behind the first place Manchester Blue Sox. The 1926 Lewiston manager was Joe Murphy.

The Lewiston Twins were led by returning manager Joe Murphy in 1927. The Twins placed fourth in the eight–team New England League final standings. Lewiston had a 46–45 record in the regular season, finishing 14.0 games behind the fifst place Lynn Papooses.

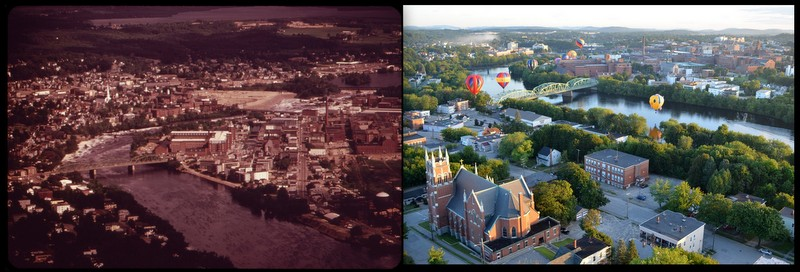
Lewiston-Auburn, ME 1973 & 2012

The 1928 Lewiston Twins were managed by Baseball Hall of Fame member Jesse Burkett and finished in third place in the New England League standings. The Twins had a 51–46 final record, finishing 3.5 games behind the New England League champion Lynn Papooses.

In 1929, the Lewiston Twins played their final full season and were led by returning manager Jesse Burkett. The Twins placed fourth in the eight–team New England League, finishing with a record of 61–56. Lewiston was 15.0 games behind the first place Manchester Red Sox in the final standings. Season attendance at Lewiston Athletic park was 40,000.

The Lewiston Twins played their final season in 1930. The Twins permanently disbanded on June 16, 1930. After the 1930 New England League began play with six teams, the Lewiston Twins had a record of 12–12 under manager Bill Slattery when the team folded. The Nashua Millionaires franchise disbanded the same day. After continuing play briefly as a four–team league, the New England League folded on June 22, 1930.

The Lewiston–Auburn area has not hosted another minor league team.

== The ballparks ==
In the seasons between 1901 and 1919, Lewiston teams played at A.A.A. Park.

The Lewiston Twins played home games at Lewiston Athletic Park beginning in 1926. The ballpark was located at Sabattus Street & Vale Street. Today, the park is still in use as a public park with baseball, football, lacrosse, field hockey and football facilities. The present public park is located at 65 Central Avenue, Lewiston, Maine.

== Timeline ==
Year(s)	# Yrs.	Team	Level	League	Ballpark
1891	1	Lewiston	Class B	New England League	A.A.A. Park
1982	1	Lewiston-Auburn Gazettes	Class B	New England League	A.A.A. Park
1893–1896	4	Lewiston	Class B	New England League	A.A.A. Park
1901	1	Lewiston	Class B	New England League	A.A.A. Park
1907	1	Lewiston	Class D	Maine State League	A.A.A. Park
1908	1	Lewiston	Class D	Atlantic Association	A.A.A. Park
1914–1915	2	Lewiston Cupids	Class B	New England League	A.A.A. Park
1919 (1)	1	Lewiston Red Sox	Class B	New England League	A.A.A. Park
1919 (2)	1	Lewiston-Auburn Twins	Class B	New England League	A.A.A. Park
1926–1930	5	Lewiston Twins	Class B	New England League	Lewiston Athletic Park

== Year–by–year records ==
Year	Record	Place	Manager	Playoffs/notes
1891	11–28	8th	Jeremiah Scannell	Entered league June 10
1892	53–45	3rd	Forrest Keay / Frank Leonard	No playoffs held
1893	56–37	2nd	John Leighton	No playoffs held
1894	46–50	5th	John Leighton / Sam LaRocque	No playoffs held
1895	47–54	5th	Mike Slattery / Michael Garrity	No playoffs held
1896	29–53	NA	Michael Garrity / Ed Flanagan; Henry Slater	Team disbanded August 12
1901	42–50	5th	Fred Doe	No playoffs held
1907	24–23	NA	George Boardman / Heald	Team disbanded August 3
1908	8–4	2nd	George Beede /Ed McDonough	League disbanded May 28
1914	57–66	5th	John McMahon / Joe Judge; Jerry McGovern	No playoffs held
1915	50–59	6th	Arthur Irwin	No playoffs held
1919 (1)	21–23	NA	Fred Parent	Team disbanded July 12
1919 (2)	38–25	1st	Mike Hayden	Team moved from Lowell July 14; League disbanded August 2 League champions
1926	50–43	3rd	Joe Murphy	No playoffs held
1927	46–45	4th	Joe Murphy	No playoffs held
1928	51–46	3rd	Jesse Burkett	No playoffs held
1929	61–56	4th	Jesse Burkett	No playoffs held
1930	12–12	NA	Bill Slattery	Team disbanded June 16

== Notable alumni ==
- Jesse Burkett (1928–1929, MGR) Inducted Baseball Hall of Fame, 1946
- Marty Bergen (1894)
- Don Brennan (1926)
- Dan Burke (1895)
- Joe Casey (1914)
- Frank Connaughton (1892–1893)
- Dan Cotter (1892)
- Pat Crisham (1895)
- Fred Doe (1907, MGR)
- Tim Donahue (1892)
- Alex Ferson (1893–1894)
- Mike Flynn (1895)
- Ed Flanagan (1896, MGR)
- Pat Friel (1896)
- Chick Gagnon (1927–1928)
- Billy Gilbert (1897)
- Jack Gilbert (1895)
- Mike Hickey (1892)
- Mike Hines (1895)
- Arthur Irwin (1915, MGR)
- Joe Judge (1914, MGR)
- Marty Karow (1927)
- John Keefe (1892)
- Nate Kellogg (1891)
- John Kiley (1891)
- Henry Killeen (1897)
- Fred Klobedanz (1893)
- Sam LaRocque (1894, MGR)
- Mike Lehane (1895)
- John Leighton (1893–1894, MGR)
- Frank Leonard (1892, MGR)
- Abel Lizotte (1891–1893)
- Dan Mahoney (1895, 1897)
- Billy Maloney (1897) 1905 NL Stolen base leader
- Pat Maloney (1914)
- Willard Mains (1894–1895)
- Pat Maloney (1914–1915)
- Dick McCabe (1915)
- Jim McCormick (1892–1894)
- Charlie McCullough (1895)
- John McGlone (1894)
- Art McGovern (1914, MGR)
- Frank McManus (1896)
- Art Merewether (1926)
- Tom Messitt (1896)
- Kohly Miller (1896)
- Bill Moran (1892)
- Bill Mundy (1914)
- John O'Brien (1892)
- John O'Connell (1895)
- Freddy Parent (1919. MGR)
- Pat Pettee (1895–1896)
- Mark Polhemus (1894)
- Frank Quinlan (1895)
- Otto Rettig (1915)
- John Rudderham (1891)
- George Sharrott (1895)
- Biff Sheehan (1892–1893, 1896)
- Mike Slattery (1894; 1895, MGR)
- Paddy Smith (1915)
- Louis Sockalexis (1895)
- Paul Speraw (1928)
- John Stafford (1893–1894, 1896)
- Pussy Tebeau (1891)
- Oscar Tuero (1915)
- Cy Twombly (1929)
- George Wheeler (1892–1894)
- Pop Williams (1895–1896)
- Chuck Wolfe (1928–1929)

== See also ==
- Lewiston Cupids players
- Lewiston Red Sox players
- Lewiston Twins players
- Lewiston (minor league baseball) players
