= St. Croix Downeasters =

- 1913; Calais, Maine

Minor league affiliations
- Class: Class D (1913)
- League: New Brunswick-Maine League (1913)

Major league affiliations
- Team: None

Minor league titles
- League titles (0): None

Team data
- Name: St. Croix Downeasters (1913)
- Ballpark: Athletic Field (1913)

The St. Croix Downeasters were a minor league baseball team based in Calais, Maine in partnership with neighboring St. Stephen, New Brunswick. In 1913, the Downeasters played as members of the Class D level New Brunswick-Maine League. The league folded during the season, with the Downeasters in third place. The Downeasters hosted minor league home games at Athletic Field in Calais, Maine.

== History ==
Minor league baseball began in Calais, Maine in 1913, when the St. Croix Downeasters became charter members of the four–team Class D level New Brunswick-Maine League. The Bangor Maroons, Fredericton Pets and St. John Marathons teams joined the Downeasters in beginning play on June 8, 1913.

The team use of the "St. Croix" portion of their nickname ties with local history. Locally, the Saint Croix River separates Calais, Maine and St. Stephen, New Brunswick. The "Downeasters" moniker corresponds to the Downeast nickname for the region, which derived from sailing terminology.

After beginning the season schedule, the New Brunswick-Maine League permanently folded on August 23, 1913. The St. Croix Downeasters were in third place with a record of 31–30 when the New Brunswick-Maine League folded. The Downeasters were managed by Ernest Doyle as St. Croix finished 8.0 games behind the first place Fredericton Pets in the final standings. In the overall final standings, the St. Croix Downeasters finished behind Fredericton (41–24) and the second place Saint John Marathons (41–29) and ahead of the fourth place Bangor Maroons (18–48) in the 1913 New Brunswick-Maine League standings. St. Croix pitcher Billy Lee led the New Brunswick-Maine League with 118 strikeouts.

The New Brunswick-Maine League did not return to play in 1914 and never reformed. Calais, Maine and St. Stephen, New Brunswick have not hosted another minor league team.

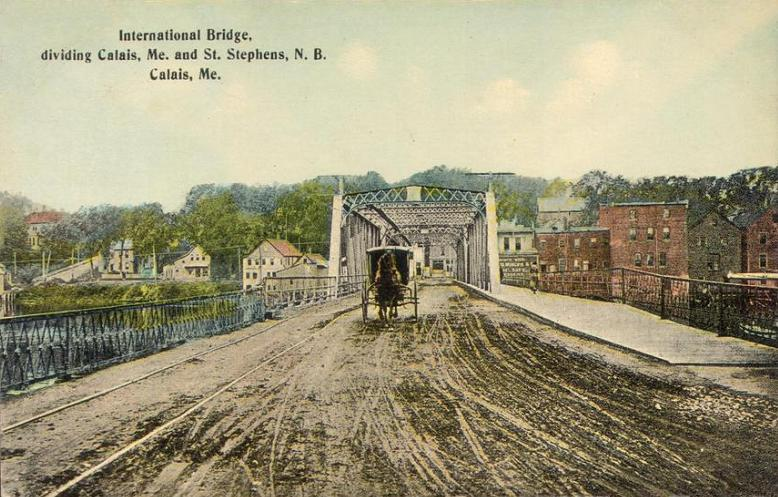
(1913) International Bridge. Calais, Maine.

== The ballpark ==
The 1913 St. Croix Downeasters were noted to have played minor league home games at Athletic Field. The ballpark was reportedly located Between Calais Avenue & Lafayette Street in Calais, Maine. The referenced location corresponds to the site of today's Thomas DiCenzo Athletic Complex, which includes ballfields.

== Year–by–year record ==
Year	Record	Finish	Manager	Playoffs/Notes
1913	31–30	3rd	Ernest Doyle	League folded August 23

== Notable alumni ==
- Merwin Jacobson (1913)
- Billy Lee (1913)
- Pat Parker (1913)

== See also ==
St. Croix Downeasters players
