= Tuero =

Tuero can refer to the following people:

- Esteban Tuero (born 1978), Argentine racing driver
- Indalecio Prieto Tuero (1883–1962), Spanish politician
- Jack Tuero (1926–2004), American tennis player
- Linda Tuero (born 1950), American tennis player
- Oscar Tuero (1898–1960), Cuban baseball player
