= Biddeford Orphans =

- 1885–1908; (1885, 1907–1908); Biddeford, Maine

Minor league affiliations
- Class: Independent (1895); Class D (1907–1908)
- League: Eastern New England League (1885); Maine State League (1907–1908)

Major league affiliations
- Team: None

Minor league titles
- League titles (0): None

Team data
- Name: Biddeford Clamdiggers (1885); Biddeford Orphans (1907–1908)
- Ballpark: St. Louis Park (1907–1908)

The Biddeford Orphans were a minor league baseball team based in Biddeford, Maine. Preceded in minor league play by the 1885 Biddeford "Clamdiggers," who played as members of the 1885 Eastern New England League, the Orphans were members of the Class D level Maine State League in 1907 and 1908, hosting home games at St. Louis Park.

== History ==
Minor league baseball began in Biddeford, Maine in 1885. The Biddeford Clamdiggers became members of the 1885 Independent level Eastern New England League. The five–team league schedule consisted of an 80–game season, with each team playing 20 games against each of the other four. On July 17, 1885, Biddeford had a record of 13–20 when the franchise disbanded and relocated to Newburyport, Massachusetts to complete the season. Playing under manager Irwin, the Biddeford/Newburyport team had a 25–55 overall record, placing fifth and last in the league standings, finishing 23.5 games behind first place Lawrence.

The 1907 Biddeford Orphans resumed play as members of the Maine State League, which reformed as an eight–team Class D level league. The "Orphans" moniker corresponds to Biddeford being home in the era to the Sisters of Mercy Orphanage. Biddeford began play in the 1907 season alongside fellow members from Augusta, Maine (Augusta Senators), Bangor, Maine (Bangor Cubs), Lewiston, Maine (Lewiston), Manchester, New Hampshire (Manchester), Portland, Maine (Pine Tree Capers), a second team in Portland (Portland Blue Sox) and Waterville, Maine (Waterville).

Biddeford continued play as the 1907 Maine State League began games on May 24, 1907. The league lost several franchises before the season concluded. Both Manchester and Waterville folded in June, with Augusta and Lewiston folding after.

With a 30–27 record, Biddeford placed second in the final 1907 standings, finishing 6.5 games behind the first place Bangor Cubs, playing the season under managers Charlie Allen and John Guiney. Bangor had a 47–31 final record, followed by the Biddeford Orphans, Portland Blue Sox (39–41) and Pine Tree Capers (27–32) in the 1907 final standings. The Augusta Senators (27–28), Lewiston (24–23), Manchester (1–7) and Waterville (8–14) all folded before the completion of the season.

In 1908, Biddeford continued play under new manager Bernie McGraw as Maine State League games began play on June 10, 1908. During the season, Pine Tree and York Beach both disbanded on July 19, 1908, and when the Portland Blue Sox disbanded on August 28, 1908, the Maine State League permanently folded. The Portland Blue Sox were in 1st place with a 32–20 record, followed the Bangor White Sox (31–22), Lewiston/Augusta (20–26) and Biddeford (18–30) in the standings. However, since Portland folded, the Bangor White Sox were awarded the 1908 Maine State League championship.

The Maine State League permanently folded following the 1908 season. Biddleford, Maine has not hosted another minor league team.

== The ballpark ==
The Biddeford Orphans were noted to have played home games at St. Louis Field in 1907 and 1908. St. Louis Field is still in use today as a public park with ballfields. It is located at 284 Hill Street Biddeford, Maine.

== Timeline ==
Year(s)	# Yrs.	Team	Level	League
1885	1	Biddeford Clamdiggers	Independent	Eastern New England League
1907–1908	2	Biddeford Orphans	Class D	Maine State League

== Year–by–year records ==
Year	Record	Finish	Manager	Playoffs/Notes
1895	25–55	5th	Irwin	Moved to Newburyport July 17
1907	30–27	2nd	Charlie Allen / John Guiney	No playoffs held
1908	18–30	4th	Bernie McGraw	League folded August 28

== Notable alumni ==
- Frank Beck (1885)
- Kid Butler (1885)
- Artie Clarke (1885)
- Charlie Fischer (1885)
- John Fox (1885)
- Jim Halpin (1885)
- John Hanna (1885)
- Pat Hartnett (1885)
- John Irwin (1885)
- Michael McDermott (1885)
- Jim McKeever (1885)
- Hank Morrison (1885)
- Henry Mullin (1885)
- Mike Slattery (1885)
- Guerdon Whiteley (1885)

== See also ==
- Biddeford (minor league baseball) players
