= Maine State League =

Class D MiLB league

- Classification: Independent (1897); Class D (1907–1908)
- Sport: Minor League Baseball
- First season: 1897
- Folded: August 28, 1908
- President: Fred K. Owen (1907)
- No. of teams: 11
- Country: United States of America
- Most titles: 2 Bangor Cubs (1907); Bangor White Sox (1908)

The Maine State League was a Class D level minor league baseball league that played in the 1897, 1907 and 1908 seasons. The eight–team Maine State League consisted of teams based in Maine and New Hampshire. The Maine State League permanently folded after the 1908 season. The Portland (1897), Bangor Cubs (1907) and Bangor White Sox (1908) teams won league championships.

== History ==
An Independent league called the Maine State League briefly played in the 1897 season as a six–team league, beginning play on May 20, 1897. After the Augusta team disbanded on June 26, 1897 and the Rockland team disbanded on July 1, 1897, the league folded on July 5, 1897. The six teams were the Augusta Kennebecs (14–8), Bangor Millionaires (12–19), Belfast Pastimes (10–16), Lewiston (15–14), Portland (21–6) and Rockland (10–19).

The Maine State League was formed for the 1907 season as an eight–team Class D level minor league under the direction of president Fred K. Owen. The Maine State League began play in the 1907 season, hosting franchises from Augusta, Maine (Augusta Senators), Bangor, Maine (Bangor Cubs), Biddeford, Maine (Biddeford Orphans), Lewiston, Maine (Lewiston), Manchester, New Hampshire (Manchester), Portland, Maine (Pine Tree Capers), a second team in Portland (Portland Blue Sox) and Waterville, Maine (Waterville).

The 1907 Maine State League began play on May 24, 1907. The league lost several franchises before the season concluded. Both Manchester and Waterville folded in June, Manchester with a 1–7 record and Waterville with an 8–14 record. The Augusta franchise disbanded on July 29, 1907, with a 27–28 record. Lewiston was 24–24 when that franchise folded on August 3, 1907.

With four teams remaining, the Bangor Cubs won the 1907 Maine State League Championship, finishing with a 47–31 final record, as the league held no playoffs. The Bangor Cubs were followed in the standings by the Biddeford Orphans (30–27), Portland Blue Sox (39-41) and Pine Tree Capers (27–32) in the 1907 standings. The Augusta Senators (27–28), Lewiston (24–23), Manchester (1–7) and Waterville (8–14) all folded before the completion of the season.

Returning to play in what ultimately was their final season of 1908, the Maine State League was a six–team league, maintaining the Class D level. Augusta, the Bangor White Sox, Biddeford, and the Portland Blue Sox comprised the 1908 league members who finished the 1908 season, as Pine Tree and York Beach disbanded during the season.

The Maine State League began play on June 10, 1908. Lewiston moved to Augusta after twelve games. Pine Tree (15–13) and York Beach (10–15) both disbanded on July 19, 1908. When Portland withdrew on August 28, 1908, the Maine State League permanently folded. The Portland Blue Sox were in 1st place with a 32–20 record when disbanding. Portland finished ahead of the Bangor White Sox (31–22), Lewiston/Augusta (20–26) and Biddeford (18–30) in the standings. However, since Portland folded, Bangor was awarded the 1908 Maine State League championship.

== Maine State League teams ==
Team name	City represented	Ballpark	Year(s) active
Augusta Kennebecs (1897); Augusta Senators (1907–1908)	Augusta, Maine	Augusta Driving Park	1897, 1907 to 1908
Bangor Millionaires (1897); Bangor Cubs (1907); Bangor White Sox (1908)	Bangor, Maine	Maplewood Park	1897, 1907 to 1908
Belfast Pastimes	Belfast, Maine	Unknown	1897
Biddeford Orphans	Biddeford, Maine	Waterhouse Field; St. Louis Field	1907 to 1908
Lewiston	Lewiston, Maine	AAA Park	1897, 1907 to 1908
Manchester	Manchester, New Hampshire	Unknown	1907
Pine Tree Capers	Portland, Maine	Back Cove Park	1907 to 1908
Portland (1897); Portland Blue Sox (1907–1908)	Portland, Maine	Back Cove Park	1897, 1907 to 1908
Rockland	Rockland, Maine	Unknown	1897
Waterville	Waterville, Maine	Colby College	1907
York Beach	York Beach, Maine	Unknown	1908

== Standings and statistics ==
=== 1897 Maine State League ===
Team standings	W	L	PCT	GB	Managers
Portland	21	6	.778	–	NA
Lewiston	15	14	.517	7	NA
Bangor Millionaires	12	19	.387	11	Jack Sharrott
Belfast Pastimes	10	16	.385	10½	NA
Rockland	10	19	.345	12	NA
Augusta Kennebecs	14	8	.636	NA	NA

Player statistics
Player	Team	Stat	Tot
Hill	Belfast	BA	.408
Dolan	Lewiston	Runs	27
Jim Callopy; Hill	Portland / Belfast	Hits	31

=== 1907 Maine State League ===
Team standings	W	L	PCT	GB	Managers
Bangor Cubs	47	31	.603	–	Fred Paige / Happy Iott
Biddleford Orphans	30	27	.526	6½	Charlie Allen / John Guiney
Portland Blue Sox	49	52	.485	9	Charlie Robinson
Pine Tree Cappers	37	42	.458	10½	Pop Williams
Augusta Senators	27	28	.491	NA	Paul Wreath
Lewiston	24	23	.511	NA	Heald
Waterville	8	14	.364	NA	George Boardman
Manchester	1	7	.125	NA	Phenomenal Smith / Conner

Player statistics
Player	Team	Stat	Tot	Player	Team	Stat	Tot
Cuke Barrows	Portland	BA	.351	Billy Gleason	Bangor	W	16
Cuke Barrows	Portland	Runs	59	Zilma Dwinal	Biddeford	SO	130
Cuke Barrows	Portland	Hits	97	Collins	Bangor	PCT	.900 9–1
Roper	Portland	HR	7				
Roper	Portland	SB	28				

=== 1908 Maine State League ===
Team standings	W	L	PCT	GB	Managers
Portland Blue Sox	32	20	.6015	–	F. Driscoll
Bangor White Sox	31	22	.585	1½	Happy Iott
Lewiston/Augusta	20	26	.435	9	Michael McDonough
Biddeford	18	30	.375	12	Charlie Allen
Pine Tree	15	13	.536	NA	Pop Williams
York Beach	10	15	.400	NA	NA
