= Bob Zupcic =

American baseball player (born 1966)

- Outfielder
- Born: August 18, 1966 (age 60); Pittsburgh, Pennsylvania, U.S.
- Batted: Right Threw: Right

MLB debut
- September 7, 1991, for the Boston Red Sox

Last MLB appearance
- August 4, 1994, for the Chicago White Sox

MLB statistics
- Batting average: .250
- Home runs: 7
- Runs batted in: 80
- Stats at Baseball Reference

Teams
- Boston Red Sox (1991–1994); Chicago White Sox (1994)

Robert Zupcic (born August 18, 1966) is an American former professional baseball outfielder. He played four seasons in Major League Baseball for the Boston Red Sox (1991–94) and Chicago White Sox (1994). He batted and threw right-handed.

In his career, Zupcic posted a .250 batting average with seven home runs and 80 runs batted in in 319 games played. Despite only hitting seven home runs in his career, Zupcic's greatest accomplishment may have been hitting two grand slams during his rookie season of 1992. As of 2011, the only other Red Sox players to have accomplished this feat are Ellis Burks and Ryan Kalish (in 1987 and 2010 respectively).

== Career ==
=== Pre-professional ===
Zupcic attended Bishop Egan High School in Fairless Hills, Pennsylvania. Zupcic, a star high school quarterback, turned down dozens of offers to play college football in order to play college baseball at Oral Roberts University. In 1985, Zupcic was awarded Baseball America's Summer Player of the Year Award after playing for the Liberal BeeJays in the Jayhawk League, a summer collegiate league in Kansas and Missouri.

=== Major League Baseball ===
The Boston Red Sox selected Zupcic in the first round of the 1987 amateur draft (32nd pick overall). Over the next few years, Zupcic slowly made his way up the ranks of the Red Sox farm system, with stops at Elmira, Lynchburg, New Britain, and Pawtucket.

In 1991, Zupcic was a late season callup for the Red Sox. He made his major league debut at Fenway Park on September 7, 1991, as a pinch runner and defensive replacement in a win against the Seattle Mariners. Two weeks later, he hit his first home run, against the New York Yankees. Zupcic wore #16 during this stint.

In 1992, under new Red Sox manager Butch Hobson, Zupcic made the team in spring training. For the rest of his Boston career he would wear #28. Injuries to starting outfielders Burks, Mike Greenwell, and other key players resulted in the Red Sox finishing in last place in the AL East. However, it did give Zupcic the opportunity to start regularly. He made the most of the chance, hitting .276, and started at all three outfield positions, collecting 11 outfield assists in 124 games.

Zupcic's defensive abilities caught the attention of longtime Boston Globe sportswriter Bob Ryan. On September 13, 1992, Zupcic climbed the bullpen railing in center field and robbed Detroit Tigers catcher Mickey Tettleton of a home run. Ryan called the play "as good a CF grab as I've seen in 41 years of Fenway watching."

In 1993, Zupcic continued to make starts at all the outfield spots. However, he proved not to be an offensive threat, and Zupcic shared playing time with a number of other players. He finished the year at .241 with only two home runs and 26 RBI.

The next season, Zupcic could not find a spot on the team. After making just four appearances in the first month, Zupcic was placed on waivers by the Red Sox. The Chicago White Sox claimed him on May 5, 1994. Zupcic made his White Sox debut on May 14 with a pinch-hit RBI single against the Texas Rangers. Over the next couple of months, Zupcic made occasional outfield starts in place of regulars Tim Raines and Darrin Jackson. He also made his first major league appearances at first base and third base. He wore #43 that season.

Zupcic played his final game on August 4, 1994, and the Major League Baseball strike resulted in the cancellation of the remainder of the season, the playoffs, and World Series.

=== Later years ===
In 1995, Zupcic was released by the White Sox. He started the 1995 season playing with the Independent Northern League's Duluth–Superior Dukes, then moved to Triple A affiliates of the Florida Marlins and White Sox, the Charlotte Knights and the Nashville Sounds. He hit a combined .291 for the three teams with 14 home runs. In 1996, Zupcic played in 44 games with the Scranton/Wilkes-Barre Red Barons, the Triple A team for the Philadelphia Phillies before playing four games with the Kansas City Royals Triple A Omaha Royals. He hit .230 for the two teams in 48 combined games with two home runs. Zupcic attended spring training with the Pittsburgh Pirates in 1997 but was released before opening day.

After a brief stint in the Mexican League with the Broncos de Reynosa, Zupcic moved to the independent Northeast League in 1997, playing for and coaching the Bangor Blue Ox. Zupcic played in only 25 of the team's 83 games, batting .195 and hitting three home runs. He retired after suffering a back injury.

== Personal ==
In 1993, he described himself as a born-again Christian.
