= New Brunswick-Maine League =

Baseball league in North America

New Brunswick–Maine League
- Classification: Class D (1913)
- Sport: Minor League Baseball
- First season: 1913
- Folded: August 24, 1913
- President: W.L. Hooper (1913)
- No. of teams: 4
- Country: United States of America
- Most titles: 1 Fredericton Pets (1913)

The New Brunswick–Maine League was a Class D level minor-league baseball league which had teams in New Brunswick, Canada and Maine, United States during the 1913 season. The league folded on August 23, 1913 and the Fredericton Pets were crowned champions with a 41–24 record.

== Cities represented ==
- Bangor, Maine: Bangor Maroons
- Fredericton, New Brunswick: Fredericton Pets
- Saint John, New Brunswick: Saint John Marathons
- St. Stephen, New Brunswick & Calais, Maine: St. Croix Downeasters

== Standings and statistics ==
1913 New Brunswick–Maine League

Team	W	L	Pct.	GB	Manager
Fredericton Pets	41	24	.631	–	Bob Ganley / William Duggan
Saint John Marathons	41	29	.586	2½	Frank Leonard
St. Croix Downeasters	31	30	.508	8	Ernest Doyle
Bangor Maroons	18	48	.273	23½	George Magoon; Frank Connaughton / Lamorey

The league disbanded August 23.

Player statistics
Player	Team	Stat	Tot	Player	Team	Stat	Tot
Louis Tetrault	St. Croix	BA	.364	Billy Lee	Calais-St.Step	SO	118
Billy O'Brien	Saint John	Runs	60	Joe Tarbell	Saint John	Pct	.688; 11–5
Louis Tetrault	St. Croix	Hits	86				
