= Augusta, Maine minor league baseball history =

Augusta, Maine minor league baseball teams
- 1895–1908; (1895–1897, 1901, 1907–1908); Augusta, Maine

Minor league affiliations
- Class: Class B (1895–1896); Independent (1897, 1901); Class D(1907–1908)
- League: New England League (1895–1896); Maine State League (1897); New England League (1901); Maine State League (1907–1908)

Major league affiliations
- Team: None

Minor league titles
- League titles (0): None

Team data
- Name: Augusta Kennebecs (1895–1897); Augusta Live Oaks (1901); Augusta Senators (1907–1908)
- Ballpark: Augusta Driving Park (1895–1897, 1901, 1907–1908)

Minor league baseball teams were based in Augusta, Maine in various seasons between 1895 and 1908. Augusta teams played as members of the New England League from 1895 to 1896, Maine State League in 1897, New England League in 1901 and the Maine State League from 1907 to 1908.

Augusta hosted home minor league games at the Augusta Driving Park.

== History ==
Minor league baseball began in Augusta, Maine with the Augusta Kennebecs, who became members of the 1895 Class B level New England League. Augusta was a late addition to the New England League and was at a disadvantage in signing players. In the 1895 season, the Kennebecs finished with a 44–54 record and were last in the eight–team league final standings. Augusta was managed by Walter Burnham, finishing 24.0 games behind the first place Fall River Indians.

The Augusta, Maine use of the "Kennebecs" team moniker is regional and corresponds to Augusta's location within Kennebec County, Maine.

The 1896 Augusta Kennebecs continued play and finished in sixth place in the New England League. Augusta was 31.0 games behind the Fall River Indians with a 35–68 record playing in the eight–team league, which lost two members during the season. Walter Harrington and Daniel Clare managed the Kennebecs in 1896.

In 1897, the Augusta Kennebecs switched leagues and joined the Independent Maine State League, with Billy Long as manager. Augusta had a 14–8 record and was in second place when the team folded on June 26, 1897, with the league folding soon after, on July 6, 1897. The entire six–team 1897 league standings featured the Augusta Kennebecs (14–8), Bangor Millionaires (12–19), Belfast Pastimes (10–16), Lewiston (15–14), Portland (21–6) and Rockland (10–19).

In 1901, the Augusta Live Oaks began the season as new members in the independent level New England League. On June 30, 1901, the team was 10–23 under manager John Leighton when the franchise briefly relocated to Lynn, Massachusetts to become the Lynn Live Oaks before folding. The Augusta/Lynn franchise disbanded on July 6, 1901, finishing with a 11–25 overall record.

The 1907 Augusta Senators resumed play as members of the Maine State League, which reformed as an eight–team Class D level league. The "Senators" moniker was in reference to Augusta being the state capitol of Maine. Augusta began play in the 1907 season alongside fellow members from Bangor, Maine (Bangor Cubs), Biddeford, Maine (Biddeford Orphans), Lewiston, Maine (Lewiston), Manchester, New Hampshire (Manchester), Portland, Maine (Pine Tree Capers), a second team in Portland (Portland Blue Sox) and Waterville, Maine (Waterville).

Augusta and the 1907 Maine State League began play on May 24, 1907. The league lost several franchises before the season concluded, Augusta included. Both Manchester and Waterville folded in June. The Augusta Senators franchise disbanded on July 29, 1907, with a 27–28 record under manager Paul Wreath. In the final 1907 standings, the Bangor Cubs had a 47–31 final record, followed by the Biddeford Orphans (30–27), Portland Blue Sox (39–41) and Pine Tree Capers (27–32) in the 1907 final standings. The Augusta Senators (27–28), Lewiston (24–23), Manchester (1–7) and Waterville (8–14) teams each folded before the completion of the season.

The Maine State League began play on June 10, 1908, without a team in Augusta. With an 8–4 record under manager Mike McDonough, the Lewiston franchise moved to Augusta. Pine Tree (15–13) and York Beach (10–15) both disbanded on July 19, 1908, and when the Portland Blue Sox disbanded on August 28, 1908, the Maine State League permanently folded. The Portland Blue Sox were in 1st place with a 32–20 record, followed the Bangor White Sox (31–22), Lewiston/Augusta (20–26) and Biddeford (18–30) in the standings. However, since Portland folded, the Bangor White Sox were awarded the 1908 Maine State League Championship.

Augusta, Maine has not hosted another minor league team.

== The ballpark ==
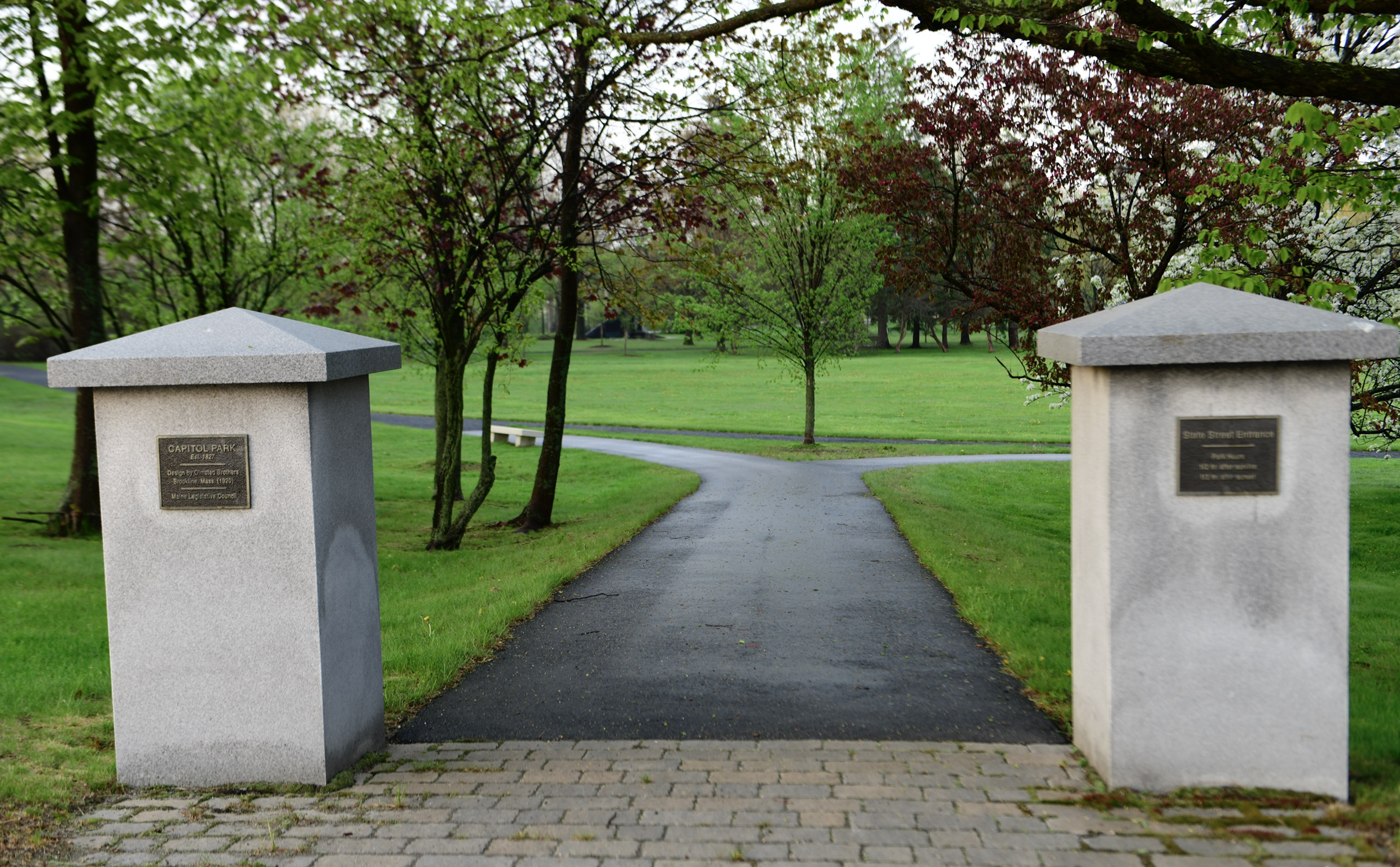
(2018) SW Entrance into Capitol Park. National Register of Historic Places. Augusta, Maine

Augusta minor league teams hosted minor league home games at the Augusta Driving Park. Augusta also played some games in nearby Gardiner, Maine and Waterville, Maine. The Driving Park was adjacent to the south of Capitol Park, which lies in the shadow of the Maine State Capitol.

== Timeline ==
Year(s)	# Yrs.	Team	Level	League	Ballpark
1895–1896	2	Augusta Kennebecs	Class B	New England League	Augusta Driving Park
1897	1	Augusta Kennebecs	Independent	Maine State League	Augusta Driving Park
1901	1	Augusta Live Oaks	Independent	New England League	Augusta Driving Park
1907–1908	2	Augusta Senators	Class D	Maine State League	Augusta Driving Park

== Year–by–year records ==
Year	Record	Finish	Manager	Playoffs/Notes
1895	44–64	8th	Walter Burnham	No playoffs held
1896	35–68	6th	Walter Harrington / Daniel Clare	No playoffs held
1897	14–8	2nd	Billy Long	League folded July 6
1901	11–25	NA	John Leighton	Team (10–23) moved to Lynn June 30; Lynn disbanded July 6
1907	27–28	NA	Paul Wreath	Team disbanded July 19
1908	20–26	3rd	Mike McDonough	Lewiston (8–4) moved to Augusta; League folded August 28

== Notable alumni ==
- Joe Bean (1895–1896)
- John Buckley (1901)
- Dick Butler (1895–1896)
- Joe Connor (1895–1897)
- Bill Coyle (1895–1896)
- Lem Cross (1901)
- Frank Dupee (1901, 1907)
- Mike Flynn (1895)
- Tom Hart (1896)
- Abbie Johnson (1895–1896)
- Mike Kelley (1895–1896)
- John Leighton (1901, MGR)
- Mike McDermott (1896)
- Jack McGeachey (1895)
- Matty McIntyre (1901)
- Frank McManus (1895)
- Dave Pickett (1895–1896)
- Ernie Ross (1901)
- Ossee Schreckengost (1897)
- Augusta Kennebecs players
- Augusta (minor league baseball) players
