= Jim Garry =

American baseball player (1869–1917)

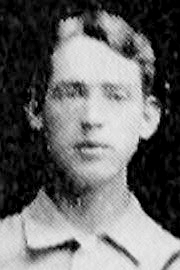
- Pitcher
- Born: September 21, 1869; Great Barrington, Massachusetts, U.S.
- Died: January 13, 1917 (aged 47); Pittsfield, Massachusetts, U.S.
- Batted: Left Threw: Left

MLB debut
- May 2, 1893, for the Boston Beaneaters

Last MLB appearance
- May 2, 1893, for the Boston Beaneaters

MLB statistics
- Win–loss record: 0–1
- Strikeouts: 2
- Earned run average: 63.00
- Stats at Baseball Reference

Teams
- Boston Beaneaters (1893)

James Thomas Garry (September 21, 1869 – January 13, 1917) was an American pitcher in Major League Baseball for the 1893 Boston Beaneaters. He had an extensive career as a minor league baseball player, which stretched from 1891 through 1913. He played primarily in the Eastern League but also played in the Connecticut State League, New England League, Western League, American League, New York State League, Hudson River League and Eastern Association. He was a player/manager in 1899, 1904 and 1905.
