= Eastern New England League =

Former minor league baseball league

- Classification: Independent (1885)
- Sport: Minor League Baseball
- First season: 1885
- Folded: 1885
- Replaced by: New England League
- President: Unknown 1885
- No. of teams: 6
- Country: United States of America
- Most titles: 1 Lawrence 1885

The Eastern New England League was a minor league baseball league that played in the 1885 season. League teams were based in Maine and Massachusetts. The league evolved into the New England League in 1886.

== History ==
The Eastern New England League was a minor league baseball league that played one season before changing its name to become the long tenured New England League. In 1885, the Eastern New England league began play with five teams, four based in Massachusetts and one in Maine. The five charter teams were Biddeford Clamdiggers, Haverhill, Lawrence, Newburyport Clamdiggers and Portland, with Lawrence winning the 1885 championship. The league continued play and shortened its name after the 1885 season.

The five–team league schedule consisted of an 80-game season, with each team playing 20 games against each of the other four. On July 17, 1885, the Biddeford Clamdiggers had a record of 13–20 when the franchise disbanded and was replaced by Newburyport, Massachusetts to complete the season.

Lawrence ended the 1885 season with a 50–31 record, finishing 2.0 games ahead of second place Brockton.

The Brockton and Lawrence teams were the top two teams competing for the 1885 Eastern New England League championship throughout the season. As the season was nearing its end, two games between the two teams were disputed. The Eastern New England League heard the appeals and ruled that the two games were to be made up at the end of the scheduled regular season. However, the Brockton team refused to play the two games and didn't show up to the first game with fans in the stands in Brockton. After a league meeting was held on October 6, 1895, the two teams were in agreement to play a three-game series for the championship, The games were scheduled to be played on October 10 in Brockton, October 13 in Lawrence, and October 15 in Boston, if necessary. Lawrence was victorious in the playoff and won the league championship.

The Eastern New England League continued play but shortened its name. The league became the newly named "New England League" and played its first game in 1886, with the same five Eastern New England League clubs plus the addition of the Boston Blues as the sixth team. The first New England League champion was the Portland team.

Baseball Hall of Fame member Frank Selee managed the 1885 Haverhill team.

== Cities represented ==
- Biddeford, Maine: Biddeford Clamdiggers (1885)
- Brockton, Massachusetts: Brockton (1885)
- Haverhill, Massachusetts: Haverhill (1885)
- Lawrence, Massachusetts: Lawrence (1885)
- Newburyport, Massachusetts: Newburyport Clamdiggers (1885)
- Portland, Maine: Portland (1985)

== Standings and statistics ==
1885 Eastern New England League

Team standings	W	L	PCT	GB	Managers
Lawrence	50	31	.617	–	Walt Burnham
Brockton	48	33	.593	2	Bill McGunnigle
Haverhill	44	35	.557	5	Walter Prince / George Brackett / Frank Selee
Portland	33	46	.418	16	John Winship / Chick Fulmer
Biddeford Clamdiggers/ Newburyport Clamdiggers	25	55	.313	24½	John Irwin

Biddeford (13–20) disbanded July 17, replaced by Newburyport July 25.
Lawrence won playoff over Brockton 2 games to 0

Player statistics
Player	Team	Stat	Tot	Player	Team	Stat	Tot
Kent Howard	Brockton	BA	.357	Dick Conway	Lawrence	W	23
William Hawes	Brockton	Runs	86	Dick Conway	Lawrence	SO	274
Walter Prince; Patrick O'Connell	Haverhill; Lawrence	RBI	61; 61	Con Murphy	Haverhill	PCT	.867 13–2
Ernest Ellis; Elmer Foster	Newburyport; Haverhill	HR	6; 6				
