= Frank Todd =

American baseball player (1869–1919)

George Franklin Todd
- Pitcher
- Born: October 18, 1869; Aberdeen, Maryland, U.S.
- Died: August 11, 1919 (aged 49); Havre De Grace, Maryland, U.S.
- Batted: Unknown Threw: Left

MLB debut
- July 14, 1898, for the Louisville Colonels

Last MLB appearance
- August 4, 1898, for the Louisville Colonels

MLB statistics
- Win–loss record: 0–2
- Earned run average: 13.91
- Strikeouts: 5
- Stats at Baseball Reference

Teams
- Louisville Colonels (1898)

George Franklin Todd (October 18, 1869 – August 11, 1919) was an American professional baseball player who played in four games for the Louisville Colonels during the 1898 season. He was born in Aberdeen, Maryland and died in Havre De Grace, Maryland at the age of 49.
