= Alex McFarlan =

American baseball player (1869–1939)

- Outfielder
- Born: October 11, 1869; St. Louis, Missouri, U.S.
- Died: March 2, 1939 (aged 69); Pewee Valley, Kentucky, U.S.
- Batted: Unknown Threw: Unknown

MLB debut
- June 19, 1892, for the Louisville Colonels

Last MLB appearance
- July 1, 1892, for the Louisville Colonels

MLB statistics
- Batting average: .167
- Home runs: 0
- Runs batted in: 1
- Stats at Baseball Reference

Teams
- Louisville Colonels (1892)

Alexander Shepard McFarlan (October 11, 1869 – March 2, 1939) was an American Major League Baseball outfielder.

== Sources ==
- Career statistics from Baseball Reference · Baseball Reference (Minors) · Retrosheet · Baseball Almanac
