= Henry Baldwin (baseball) =

American baseball player (1894-1964)

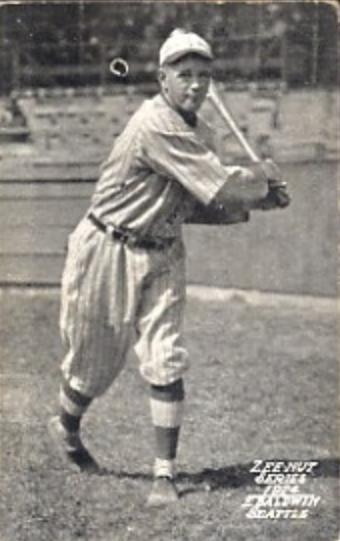
- Infielder
- Born: June 13, 1894; Chadds Ford, Pennsylvania, U.S.
- Died: February 24, 1964 (aged 69); West Chester, Pennsylvania, U.S.
- Batted: Right Threw: Right

MLB debut
- May 22, 1927, for the Philadelphia Phillies

Last MLB appearance
- June 3, 1927, for the Philadelphia Phillies

MLB statistics
- Games played: 6
- At bats: 16
- Hits: 5
- Stats at Baseball Reference

Teams
- Philadelphia Phillies (1927)

Henry Clay Baldwin (June 13, 1894 – February 24, 1964), nicknamed "Ted", was an American Major League Baseball infielder. Baldwin played for the Philadelphia Phillies in 1927. In six career games, he had five career hits in 16 career at-bats. He batted and threw right-handed. Balwin attended Swarthmore College.

Baldwin was born in Chadds Ford, Pennsylvania and died in West Chester, Pennsylvania.
