= Artie Gore =

American baseball umpire (1907-1986)

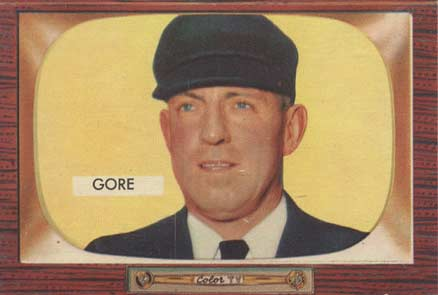
- Born: Arthur Joseph Gore; November 13, 1907; Cambridge, Massachusetts, U.S.
- Died: September 29, 1986 (aged 78); Wolfeboro, New Hampshire, U.S.
- Occupation: Umpire
- Years active: 1947–1956
- Employer: National League

Arthur Joseph Gore (November 13, 1907 – September 29, 1986) was an American professional baseball umpire who worked in the National League from 1947 to 1956. Gore umpired 1,464 major league games in his 10-year career. He umpired in two World Series and two All-Star Games. Gore played minor league baseball in 1928 and 1929 as a shortstop.

== Early life ==
From 1927 to 1929, Gore played for the combined Chatham-Harwich team in the Cape Cod Baseball League. He returned to the Cape League in 1934 to play for Barnstable, where he was a crowd favorite, known for his "chatter, pepper, and flashy fielding."

== Umpiring career ==
Before being promoted to the major leagues in 1947, Gore umpired in the Canadian-American League in 1937 and 1938, in the Eastern League from 1939 to 1942, and in the International League from 1942 to 1946. He umpired in the 1951 and 1953 World Series and two All-Star Games (1949 and 1956).

In December 1956, NL president Warren Giles released Gore from the league to make room for younger umpires Ken Burkhart and Tony Venzon.

== Later life ==
Gore moved to New Hampshire in his later years. He died there after a brief illness in September 1986. He was 78.

== See also ==
- List of Major League Baseball umpires (disambiguation)
