= Otto Rettig =

American baseball player (1894–1977)

- Pitcher
- Born: January 29, 1894; New York City, U.S.
- Died: June 16, 1977 (aged 83); Stuart, Florida, U.S.
- Batted: Right Threw: Right

MLB debut
- July 19, 1922, for the Philadelphia Athletics

Last MLB appearance
- August 5, 1922, for the Philadelphia Athletics

MLB statistics
- Win–loss record: 1-2
- Earned run average: 4.91
- Strikeouts: 3
- Stats at Baseball Reference

Teams
- Philadelphia Athletics (1922)

Adolph John "Otto" Rettig (January 29, 1894 – June 16, 1977) was an American Major League Baseball pitcher who played in 1922 with the Philadelphia Athletics. He started four games, going 1–2 with a 4.91 ERA, walking 12 batters. He pitched 18⅓ innings.
