= Happy Iott =

American baseball player (1876-1941)

- Center fielder
- Born: July 7, 1876; Houlton, Maine, U.S.
- Died: February 17, 1941 (aged 64); Island Falls, Maine, U.S.
- Batted: Right Threw: Right

MLB debut
- September 16, 1903, for the Cleveland Naps

Last MLB appearance
- September 18, 1903, for the Cleveland Naps

MLB statistics
- Batting average: .200
- Home runs: 0
- Runs batted in: 0
- Stats at Baseball Reference

Teams
- Cleveland Naps (1903)

Frederick Bidds "Happy" Iott (July 7, 1876 – February 17, 1941) was an American professional baseball center fielder. He played in Major League Baseball with the Cleveland Naps in 1903. He was born in Houlton, Maine, and pitched for the town team there. In 1897, he was on the Houlton team that won the state championship.

Known as "Happy Jack," Iott played professional baseball in the New England League in 1902 and 1903. In the latter season, he hit .317 for the Fall River Indians and won the league batting title. Iott was then acquired by the major league Cleveland Naps. He played three games for Cleveland from September 16 to September 18 and got 2 hits in 10 at bats.

Iott returned to Fall River in 1904 and also played in the Connecticut State League before retiring from baseball. He died in Island Falls, Maine, in 1941.
