= Bill Moran (catcher) =

American baseball player (1869–1916)

- Catcher / Left fielder
- Born: October 10, 1869; Joliet, Illinois, U.S.
- Died: April 8, 1916 (aged 46); Joliet, Illinois, U.S.
- Batted: Unknown Threw: Unknown

MLB debut
- May 7, 1892, for the St. Louis Browns

Last MLB appearance
- July 5, 1895, for the Chicago Colts

MLB statistics
- Batting average: .147
- Home runs: 1
- Runs batted in: 14
- Stats at Baseball Reference

Teams
- St. Louis Browns (1892); Chicago Colts (1895)

William L. Moran (October 10, 1869 – April 8, 1916) was an American catcher and left fielder in Major League Baseball who played in part of two seasons in the National League. He was from Joliet, Illinois, near Chicago, and was the younger brother of Julie Moran Wyman, a famous opera singer of the day.

== See also ==
- Loraine Wyman—his brush with the law while attempting to help his sister in a custody dispute
