= Mike Flynn (baseball) =

Irish baseball player (1872–1941)

- Catcher
- Born: March 15, 1872; County Kildare, Ireland
- Died: June 16, 1941 (aged 69); Hollywood, California, U.S.

MLB debut
- August 31, 1891, for the Boston Reds

Last MLB appearance
- August 31, 1891, for the Boston Reds

MLB statistics
- Games played: 1
- At bats: 2
- Stats at Baseball Reference

Teams
- Boston Reds (1891)

Michael J. Flynn (March 15, 1872 – June 16, 1941) was a Major League Baseball catcher, at least for one day, during the 1891 season. He was born in County Kildare, Ireland.

He played in one game for the Boston Reds of the American Association, on August 31, 1891. Behind the plate, he handled six chances flawlessly for a fielding percentage of 1.000. At the plate, he went 0-for-2 for a .000 batting average. The game with the Louisville Colonels ended in a 2–2 tie. It was played at the Congress Street Grounds in Boston, Massachusetts.

Flynn, a 19-year-old, was the sixth-youngest player to appear in an A.A. game that season.

== See also ==
- List of players from Ireland in Major League Baseball
