= Cuke Barrows =

American baseball player (1883–1955)

- Outfielder
- Born: October 20, 1883; Gray, Maine, U.S.
- Died: February 10, 1955 (aged 71); Gorham, Maine, U.S.
- Batted: Right Threw: Left

MLB debut
- September 18, 1909, for the Chicago White Sox

Last MLB appearance
- September 10, 1912, for the Chicago White Sox

MLB statistics
- Batting average: .192
- Hits: 19
- RBI: 9
- Stats at Baseball Reference

Teams
- Chicago White Sox (1909–1912)

Roland "Cuke" Barrows (October 20, 1883 – February 10, 1955) was an American professional baseball outfielder who played for the Chicago White Sox of Major League Baseball from 1909 to 1912. Barrows played in 32 games and had a career batting average of .192.
