= Bangor, Maine minor league baseball history =

Bangor, Maine minor league baseball teams
- 1894–2004; (1894–1897, 1901, 1907–1908, 1913, 1994–1997, 2003–2004); Bangor, Maine

Minor league affiliations
- Class: Class B (1894–1896); Independent (1897, 1901); Class D (1907–1908, 1913); Independent (1994–1997, 2003–2004)
- League: New England League (1894–1896); Maine State League (1897); New England League (1901); Maine State League (1907–1908); New Brunswick-Maine League (1913); Northeast League (1994–1997, 2003–2004)

Major league affiliations
- Team: None

Minor league titles
- League titles (2): 1907; 1908

Team data
- Name: Bangor Millionaires (1894–1897); Bangor (1901); Bangor Cubs (1907); Bangor White Sox (1908); Bangor Maroons (1913); Bangor Blue Ox (1994–1997); Bangor Lumberjacks (2003–2004)
- Ballpark: Maplewood Park (1894–1897, 1901, 1907–1908, 1913); Mahaney Diamond (1994–1997, 2003); Winkin Complex (2004)

Minor league baseball teams were based in Bangor, Maine between 1894 and 1913, before resuming minor league play in 1994. Playing under numerous nicknames, Bangor teams played as members of the New England League from 1894 to 1896, Maine State League in 1897, New England League in 1901, Maine State League from 1907–1908 and New Brunswick-Maine League in 1913, winning two league championships while hosting early minor league home games at Maplewood Park.

Many decades later, Bangor hosted the Bangor Blue Ox (1994–1997) and Bangor Lumberjacks (2003–2004), who played as members of the Independent Northeast League.

== History ==
Minor league baseball began in Bangor, Maine with the 1894 Bangor "Millionaires," who became members of the eight–team New England League. In the 1894 season, the Millionaires finished with a 48–48 record and placed fourth in the league final standings. Bangor was managed by Louis Bacon and Jack Sharrott, finishing 13.5 games behind the first place Fall River Indians.

Bangor continued play in the 1895 Class B level New England League, placing third in the league standings. The Millionaires ended the season with a 55–49 record under managers Jack Sharrott and William Long, finishing 11.0 games behind the first place Fall River Indians.

The 1896 Bangor Millionaires placed second in the New England League standings. Bangor finished 2.5 games behind the first place Fall River Indians with a 63–39 record in the eight–team league. William Long and Mike McDermott were the managers.

In 1897, the Bangor Millionaires switched leagues, joining the independent level Maine State League, which folded during the season. With Jack Sharrott returning as manager, Bangor had 12–19 record and were in third place when the league folded. The six–team 1897 final league standings featured the Augusta Kennebecs (14–8), Bangor Millionaires (12–19), Belfast Pastimes (10–16), Lewiston (15–14), Portland (21–6) and Rockland (10–19).

Returning to minor league in 1901, Bangor began the season as members of the independent level New England League before relocating during the season. On June 30, 1901, Bangor had a record of 22–14 under manager Walter Burnham when the franchise relocated to Brockton, Massachusetts. The Bangor/Brockton franchise disbanded on July 6, 1901, finishing with a 24–16 overall record.

Bangor was without a minor league team until the 1907 Maine State League reformed as an eight–team Class D league. Bangor began play in the 1907 season alongside fellow members from Augusta, Maine (Augusta Senators), Biddeford, Maine (Biddeford Orphans), Lewiston, Maine (Lewiston), Manchester, New Hampshire (Manchester), Portland, Maine (Pine Tree Capers), a second team in Portland (Portland Blue Sox) and Waterville, Maine (Waterville).

Bangor and the 1907 Maine State League began play on May 24, 1907. The league lost several franchises before the season concluded. Both Manchester and Waterville folded in June, Manchester with a 1–7 record and Waterville with an 8–14 record. The Augusta franchise disbanded on July 29, 1907, with a 27–28 record. Lewiston was 24–24 when that franchise folded on August 3, 1907.

With four teams remaining, the Bangor Cubs won the 1907 Maine State League Championship. Bangor had a 47–31 final record, as the league held no playoffs. The Bangor Cubs were followed by the Biddeford Orphans (30–27), Portland Blue Sox (39–41) and Pine Tree Capers (27–32) in the 1907 final standings. The Augusta Senators (27–28), Lewiston (24–23), Manchester (1–7) and Waterville (8–14) all folded before the completion of the season.

Bangor returned to play as the Bangor White Sox in the six–team 1908 Maine State League, winning a second consecutive championship in an unconventional manner. Bangor joined Augusta, Biddeford, and the Portland Blue Sox as the 1908 league members who finished the season, as Pine Tree and York Beach disbanded during the season.

Bangor and the Maine State League began play on June 10, 1908. The Lewiston franchise moved to Augusta after twelve games. Pine Tree (15–13) and York Beach (10–15) both disbanded on July 19, 1908. When the Portland Blue Sox disbanded on August 28, 1908, the Maine State League permanently folded. The Portland Blue Sox were in 1st place with a 32–20 record when disbanding. Portland finished ahead of the Bangor White Sox (31–22), Lewiston/Augusta (20–26) and Biddeford (18–30) in the standings. However, since Portland folded, the Bangor White Sox were awarded the 1908 Maine State League Championship.

Baseball returned to Bangor when the Bangor Maroons were charter members of the four–team 1913 Class D level New Brunswick-Maine League. Bangor finished with a 18–48, record and in fourth place, playing the season under managers George Magoon, Frank Connaughton and Lamorey. Bangor finished 23.5 games behind the first place Fredericton Pets. The league folded after their only season.

Bangor was without a minor league team for over 80 years, until the Bangor Blue Ox became members of the 1994 independent Northeast League.

== The ballparks ==
Early Bangor minor league teams played home games at Maplewood Park. The ballpark was called Maplewood Park as the site was home to the Maplewood Hotel. The site was later called Eastern Maine Fairgrounds and then Bass Park. Harness racing has been hosted at the site throughout its duration. Today, Bass Park continues as the long time home of the Bangor State Fair.

The Bangor Blue Ox and Bangor Lumberjacks teams played minor league home games at the Mahaney Diamond on the campus of the University of Maine.

For their final season of 2004, the Bangor Lumberjacks hosted home games at the Winkin Complex.

== Bangor timeline ==
Year(s)	# Yrs.	Team	Level	League	Ballparks
1894–1896	3	Bangor Millionaires	Class B	New England League	Maplewood Park
1897	1	Bangor Millionaires	Independent	Maine State League	Maplewood Park
1901	1	Bangor	Independent	New England League	Maplewood Park
1907	1	Bangor Cubs	Class D	Maine State League	Maplewood Park
1908	1	Bangor White Sox	Class D	Maine State League	Maplewood Park
1913	1	Bangor Maroons	Class D	New Brunswick-Maine League	Maplewood Park
1994–1997	4	Bangor Blue Ox	Independent	Northeast League	Mahaney Diamond
2003–2004	2	Bangor Lumberjacks	Independent	Northeast League	Winkin Complex

== Notable alumni ==
- John Buckley (1895)
- Ray Collins (1907)
- Frank Connaughton (1913)
- Joe Connor (1895)
- Jack Cronin (1897)
- Joe Dolan (1913)
- Fred Donovan (1894)
- H. L. Fairbanks (1894–1895)
- Eddie Files (1907)
- Larry Gardner (1907) Boston Red Sox Hall of Fame
- Chummy Gray (1894)
- George Henry (1895–1896)
- Jack Horner (1896)
- Happy Iott (1907–1908, MGR)
- Willard Mains (1896)
- Pete McBride (1894)
- John McGlone (1894)
- Art Nichols (1894)
- John O'Connell (1894)
- Tom O'Brien (1894–1896)
- Paul Radford (1896)
- Mike Roach (1896)
- Jack Sharrott (1894–1895, 1897, NGR)
- Hank Simon (1896)
- Mike Slattery (1894)
- Louis Sockalexis (1907) Cleveland Indians Hall of Fame
- Mike Sullivan (1896)
- George Wheeler (1894–1896)
- Bill White (1894)
- Nick Wise (1897)

== See also ==
- Bangor (minor league baseball) players
- Bangor Maroons players
- Bangor Millionaires players
