= George Sharrott =

American baseball player (1869–1932)

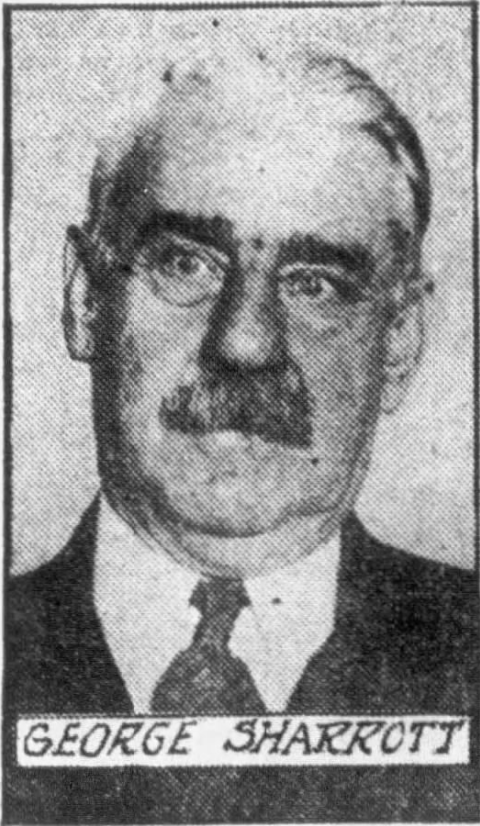
- Sharrott c. 1925
- Pitcher
- Born: November 2, 1869; Staten Island, New York, U.S.
- Died: January 5, 1932 (aged 62); Jamaica, New York, U.S.
- Batted: Left Threw: Left

MLB debut
- July 27, 1893, for the Brooklyn Grooms

Last MLB appearance
- May 4, 1894, for the Brooklyn Bridegrooms

MLB statistics
- Win–loss record: 4–7
- Earned run average: 5.97
- Strikeouts: 26
- Stats at Baseball Reference

Teams
- Brooklyn Grooms (1893–1894)

George Oscar Sharrott (November 2, 1869 – January 5, 1932) was a 19th-century American Major League Baseball (MLB) pitcher. He played from 1893 to 1894 with the Brooklyn Grooms.

Sharrott was born in New Brighton, Staten Island and worked as a printer, playing amateur baseball and cricket in his spare time. His performance with the New York Athletic Club earned him a spot on the roster of the Brooklyn club of the National League in 1893. Manager Dave Foutz found that his pitching staff was struggling from the newly instituted mound distance of 60 feet and 6 inches and, after the team's poor performance on a road trip in July, added Sharrott to the roster. He was the team's youngest pitcher at 25 years old, leading to teasing from his older teammates.

In 1897, a few months after his final season of minor league baseball, his wife, Grace, filed in the New York Supreme Court for a separation on the ground that he was "lazy," per the Brooklyn Eagle. At the time, he was reportedly coaching college baseball clubs. In the 32 years before his death, he was employed by the Brooklyn Daily Times. For the last 20 of those years, he was the head of their advertising department. He was survived by his wife, Anna.
