= Oscar Tuero =

Cuban baseball player (1898–1960)

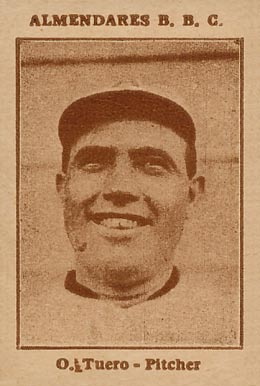
- Pitcher
- Born: December 17, 1898; Havana, Cuba
- Died: October 21, 1960 (aged 61); Houston, Texas, U.S.
- Batted: Right Threw: Right

MLB debut
- May 30, 1918, for the St. Louis Cardinals

Last MLB appearance
- April 19, 1920, for the St. Louis Cardinals

MLB statistics
- Win–loss record: 6–9
- Earned run average: 2.88
- Strikeouts: 58
- Stats at Baseball Reference

Teams
- St. Louis Cardinals (1918–1920)

Oscar Tuero (December 17, 1898 – October 21, 1960) was a Cuban professional baseball player. He was a right-handed pitcher over parts of three seasons (1918–1920) with the St. Louis Cardinals.

== Career ==
For his career, he compiled a 6–9 record in 58 appearances, mostly as a relief pitcher, with a 2.88 earned run average and 58 strikeouts.

== Birth and death ==
Tuero was born in Havana, Cuba and died in Houston, Texas at the age of 61.

== See also ==
- List of Major League Baseball annual saves leaders
