= Mike Slattery (baseball) =

American baseball player (1866–1904)

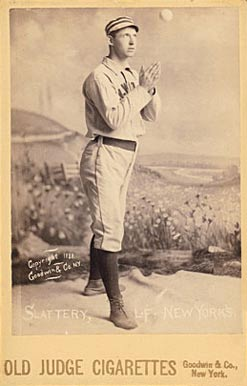
- 1888 baseball card of Slattery
- Outfielder
- Born: November 26, 1866; Boston, Massachusetts, U.S.
- Died: October 16, 1904 (aged 37); Boston, Massachusetts, U.S.
- Batted: Left Threw: Left

MLB debut
- April 17, 1884, for the Boston Reds

Last MLB appearance
- July 23, 1891, for the Washington Statesmen

MLB statistics
- Batting average: .251
- Home runs: 8
- Runs batted in: 135
- Stats at Baseball Reference

Teams
- Boston Reds (1884); New York Giants (NL) (1888–1889); New York Giants (PL) (1890); Cincinnati Reds (1891); Washington Statesmen (1891)

Michael J. Slattery (November 26, 1866 – October 16, 1904) was an American professional baseball player. He played five seasons in Major League Baseball between 1884 and 1891 for the Boston Reds, New York Giants (NL), New York Giants (PL), Cincinnati Reds, and Washington Statesmen, primarily as an outfielder.
