= Portland Blue Sox =

- 1897–1913; (1897, 1907–1908, 1913); Portland, Maine

Minor league affiliations
- Previous classes: Class D (1907–1908, 1913); Independent (1897)
- Previous leagues: Maine State League (1897, 1907–1908); Atlantic Association (1908); New England League (1919)

Major league affiliations
- Previous teams: None

Minor league titles
- League titles: 1897

Team data
- Previous names: Portland (1897); Portland Blue Sox (1907–1908); Pine Tree Capers (1907–1908); Portland Blue Sox (1919)
- Previous parks: Back Cove Park

The Portland Blue Sox were a class-D minor league baseball team in Portland, Maine which played from 1907 to 1908 in the Maine State League and the Atlantic Association before folding. The Blue Sox were relaunched in 1919 to make up for the loss of the Portland Duffs, which folded in 1917 and played in the Eastern League. The 1919 Blue Sox were added to the New England League, but only lasted one season.

== History ==
Portland first played minor league baseball in the 1897 Maine State League.

Portland had two franchises when the Maine State League was formed for the 1907 season as an eight–team Class D minor league. The Maine State League began play in the 1907 season hosting franchises from Augusta, Maine (Augusta Senators), Bangor, Maine (Bangor Cubs), Biddeford, Maine (Biddeford Orphans), Lewiston, Maine (Lewiston), Manchester, New Hampshire (Manchester), Portland, Maine (Pine Tree Capers), a second team in Portland (Portland Blue Sox) and Waterville, Maine (Waterville).

The 1907 Maine State League began play on May 24, 1907 and two new Portland franchises joined the league. During the 1907 season, the league lost several franchises before the season concluded, but the Portland teams remained. Both Manchester and Waterville folded in June, Manchester with a 1–7 record and Waterville with an 8–14 record. The Augusta franchise disbanded on July 29, 1907, with a 27–28 record. Lewiston was 24–24 when that franchise folded on August 3, 1907.

With four teams remaining, the Portland teams finished 3rd and 4th in the standings as the Bangor Cubs won the 1907 Maine State League Championship. Bangor had a 47–31 final record, followed by the Biddeford Orphans (30–27), Portland Blue Sox (39-41) and Pine Tree Capers (27–32) in the 1907 standings. The Augusta Senators (27–28), Lewiston (24–23), Manchester (1–7) and Waterville (8–14) all folded before the completion of the season.

In 1908, Portland had the best record in the Maine State League, when the franchise folded. Augusta, the Bangor White Sox, Biddeford, and the Portland Blue Sox comprised the 1908 league members who remained after the Pine Tree and York Beach franchises disbanded during the season.

The Maine State League began play on June 10, 1908 and had both Portland franchises in the league. Pine Tree (15–13) and York Beach (10–15) both disbanded on July 19, 1908. When the Portland Blue Sox withdrew on August 28, 1908, it caused the remaining Maine State League to fold. The Portland Blue Sox were in 1st place with a 32–20 record when disbanding. Portland finished ahead of the Bangor White Sox (31–22), Lewiston/Augusta (20–26) and Biddeford (18–30) in the standings. However, since Portland folded, Bangor was awarded the 1908 Maine State League Championship.

== The ballpark ==
Portland also hosted a second team in the Maine State League in 1907 and 1908, the Pine Tree Capers. Both teams played at Back Cove Park in Portland.

== Notable alumni ==
Cuke Barrows of Gray, Maine, who went on to play with the Chicago White Sox, played on the 1907 Portland Blue Sox.
