= Frank Connaughton =

American baseball player (1869–1942)

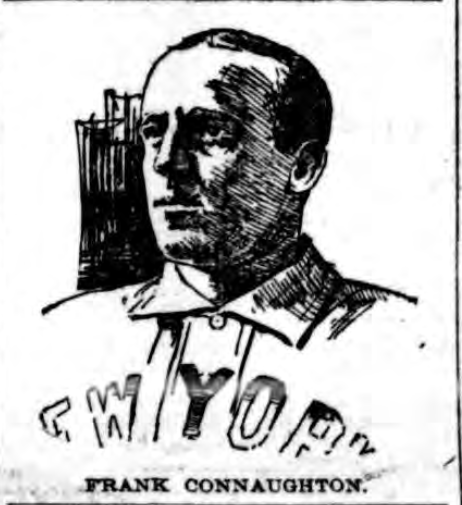
- Shortstop / Outfielder
- Born: January 1, 1869; Clinton, Massachusetts, U.S.
- Died: December 1, 1942 (aged 73); Boston, Massachusetts, U.S.
- Batted: Right Threw: Right

MLB debut
- May 28, 1894, for the Boston Beaneaters

Last MLB appearance
- October 5, 1906, for the Boston Beaneaters

MLB statistics
- Batting average: .283
- Home runs: 4
- Runs batted in: 77
- Stats at Baseball Reference

Teams
- Boston Beaneaters (1894); New York Giants (1896); Boston Beaneaters (1906)

Frank Henry Connaughton (January 1, 1869 – December 1, 1942) was an American Major League Baseball shortstop and outfielder. His professional career lasted from 1891 to 1913 and included three brief stints as a minor league baseball manager.

In 146 games over three seasons, Connaughton posted a .283 batting average (150-for-530) with 98 runs, 4 home runs, 77 RBI, 26 stolen bases and 44 bases on balls.
