= New Bedford Whalers (baseball) =

- 1895–1934; (1895–1898, 1903–1915, 1928, 1933-1934); New Bedford, Massachusetts

Minor league affiliations
- Class: Class B (1895–1898, 1903–1913); Class C (1914); Independent (1915); Class B (1929, 1933-1934)
- League: New England League (1895–1898, 1903–1913); Colonial League (1914–1915); New England League (1933); Northeastern League (1934)

Major league affiliations
- Team: None

Minor league titles
- League titles (2): 1910; 1933

Team data
- Name: New Bedford Whalers (1895); New Bedford Browns (1896); New Bedford Whalers (1897-1989, 1903–1915); New Bedford Millmen (1929); New Bedford Whalers (1933-1934)
- Ballpark: Olympic Field (1895–1898); Sargent Field (1903–1915, 1928, 1933-1934)

The New Bedford Whalers were a minor league baseball team based in New Bedford, Massachusetts. Between 1895 and 1933, New Bedford teams played as members of the New England League (1895–1898, 1902–1913), Colonial League (1914–1915), New England League (1929 and 1933) and 1934 Northeastern League, winning the 1910 and 1933 league championships.

The New Bedford teams were nicknamed the "Whalers" in each season, with the exceptions of the "Browns" in 1896 and the "Millmen" in 1928.

The New Bedford teams hosted home minor league games at Olympic Field beginning in 1893 through 1898, moving to Sargent Field from 1903 until their final season of 1934.

Baseball Hall of Fame member Rabbit Maranville played for the 1911 and 1912 New Bedford Whalers.

== History ==
=== New England League 1895 to 1898 ===
The Whalers were preceded in minor league play by the 1878 New Bedford team, that briefly played as members of the International Association for Professional Base Ball Players before relocating to first New Haven, Connecticut and then to Hartford, Connecticut, where the team was folded after playing 12 total games, compiling 1-11 record. Baseball Hall of Fame members Candy Cummings and Roger Connor played for the 1878 team.

In 1895 the New Bedford Whalers joined the eight–team Class B level New England League Augusta Kennebecs, Bangor Millionaires, Brockton Shoemakers, Fall River Indians, Lewiston, Pawtucket Maroons and Portland joined New Bedford in beginning league play on April 27, 1895.

The New Bedford use of the "Whalers" nickname corresponds with the local whaling industry and history. The New Bedford area was first developed as a whaling port in the mid 1700s. The city gained a reputation as the greatest whaling port in the world and claimed to be the richest city per capita in the world. The city remains home to the New Bedford Whaling National Historical Park.

Today, New Bedford High School teams have long held the "Whalers" nickname. The school was founded in 1827.

The 1895 New Bedford Whalers placed second as the New England League played in their first season as a Class B level league. With Fred Doe managing the Whalers, the team finished behind the first place Fall River Indians, who ended the regular season with a 67–39 record and finished 6.5 games ahead of New Bedford, who had a 60-45 record in the final standings of the eight–team league. New Bedford hosted home games at Olympic Field.

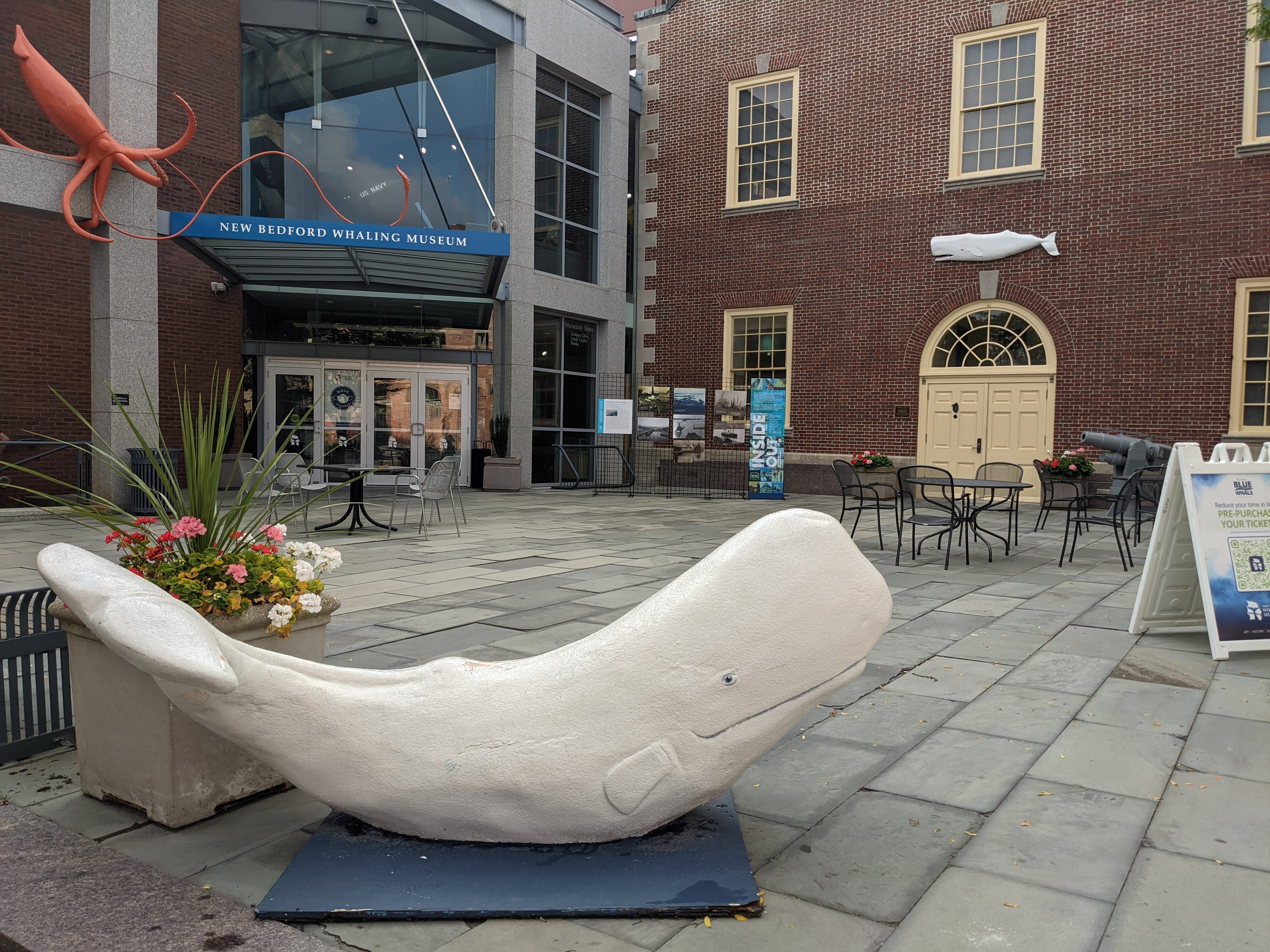
(2020) Entrance to New Bedford Whaling Museum. New Bedford Whaling National Historical Park.

The New Bedford "Browns" continued New England League play in 1896 and placed fourth in the eight-team league. The Browns completed the season with a record of 57–48, playing the season under returning manager Fred Doe. New Bedford finished 5.5 games behind the first place Falls River Indians in the final standings.

The New Bedford resumed the "Whalers" nickname and the team placed last in the six-team 1897 New England League. New Bedford ended the 1897 New England League season with a 38–67 record, as Con Murphy and Michael McDermott served as managers. The Whalers finished 33.5 games behind the co-champion Brockton Shoemakers and Newport Colts (tie) in the six–team New England League final standings.

The 1898 New Bedford Whalers relocated after beginning the season as members of the six–team 1898 Class B level New England League. On June 14, 1898, the New Bedford franchise moved to Worcester, Massachusetts, with a 18-20 record. After seven games based in Worcester, the team folded and ended play with an overall record of 22–23. The team played their partial season under managers Charles Rice and Fred Doe before folding, as the first place -Brockton Shoemakers captured the league championship. New Bedford played its final minor league games at Olympic Field in 1898.

The New Bedford franchise did not return to the 1899 New England League.

=== New England League 1903 to 1913 ===
In 1903, the New Bedford Whalers resumed minor league play, returning to the eight–team Class B level New England League during the season. On June 23, 1903, the Brockton Shoemakers moved to New Bedford with an 18-23 record. The Whalers joined the Concord Marines, Fall River Indians, Haverhill Hustlers, Lawrence Colts, Lowell Tigers, Manchester and Nashua teams in league play.

Finishing out the season, the New Bedford Whalers placed seventh in the 1903 New England League standings. With an overall record of 46–63 record, the Whalers finished 24.0 games behind the first place Lowell Tigers in the final standings. Fred Doe served his second season as the manager in New Bedford. New Bedford began playing home games at Sargent Field, which would host minor league baseball until the Whalers played their last season in 1934.

With Fred Doe continuing as manager, the New Bedford Whalers placed second in the 1904 New England League. The Whalers ended the season with a 64–58 record in the eight–team league, finishing 17.0 games behind the first place Haverhill Hustlers (82–41) in the final standings. Fred Doe continued his tenure as the New Bedford manager.

The 1905 New England League standings saw the New Bedford Whalers finish in fourth place. New Bedford ended the season with a record of 60–50, finishing 10.0 games behind the first place Concord Marines, who had a 69–39 record. Fred Doe again managed the Whalers in the final season of his New Bedford managerial tenure.

With the New Bedford Whalers placed fourth in the eight–team 1906 New England League. Ending the season with a record of 63–54, the Whalers finished 11.5 games behind the champion Worcester Busters in the final standings. Jim Canavan managed New Bedford in 1906.

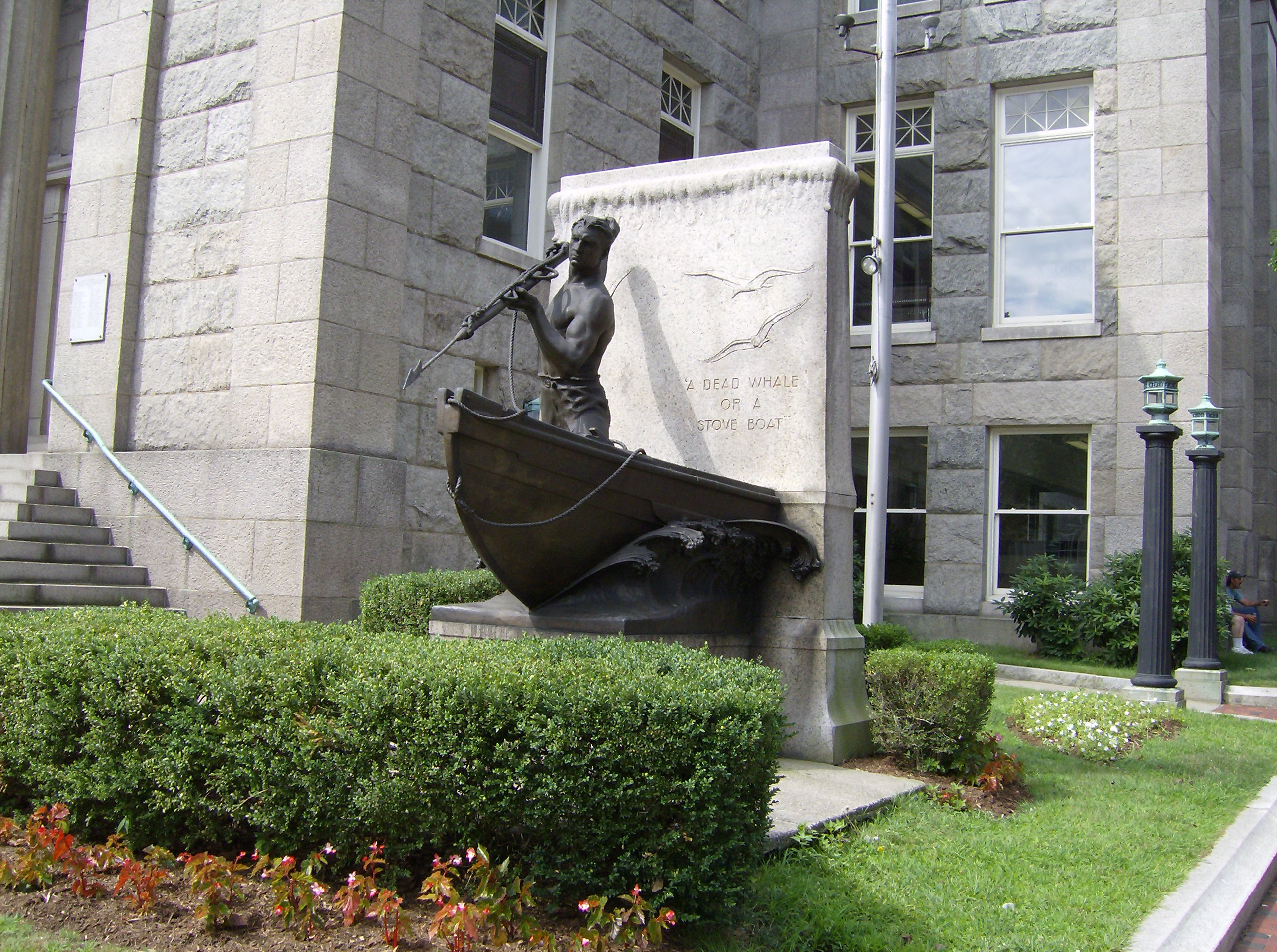
(2006) Whaler statue. New Bedford Public Library.

The 1907 New Bedford Whalers placed seventh in the Class B level New England League. Playing under returning manager Jim Canavan, the Whalers ended the 1907 season with a record of 48–62, finishing 27.0 games behind the first place Worcester Busters.

As the Worcester Busters again won the league championship, the New Bedford Whalers finished last in the 1908 New England League. New Bedford had a final record of 46–78 under the direction of managers Jim Canavan and Tommy Corcoran. Finishing 34.0 games behind Worcester, the Whalers placed eighth in the eight–team league.

The 1909 New Bedford Whalers placed sixth in the New England League, as Worcester again won the championship. With a 51–72, record, New Bedford finished 25.5 games out of first place, as Tommy Dowd managed the Whalers. Roland Barrows led the New England in runs scored, with 88.

The New Bedford Whalers won their first New England League championship in 1910 season, ending the season with a record of 77–48. New Bedford placed first in the standings under returning manager Tommy Dowd, finishing 15.0 games ahead of the second place Lynn Shoemakers in the final standings of the eight-team league.

The New Bedford Whalers placed seventh in the 1911 New England League standings one season after winning the league championship. The Whalers ended the 1911 season with a 45–75 season record, as Jim Sullivan served as manager. New Bedford finished 30.50 games behind the champion Lowell Tigers.

Future Baseball Hall of Fame member Rabbit Maranville played shortstop for the Whalers in 1911. In his first professional season at age 19, Maranville hit .228 in 117 games for New Bedford.

The 1912 New Bedford Whalers continued play and finished sixth in the eight–team New England League. Playing under managers Frank Connaughton and Jim Sullivan, New Bedford finished with a 57–67 record. The first place Lawrence Barristers (76–47) were 19.5 games ahead of the Whalers in the league standings.

Rabbit Maranville returned to play for the 1912 Whalers before advancing to the major leagues during the season. In 112 games for New Bedford, Maranville hit .283, before making his major league debut with 26 games for the 1912 Boston Braves.

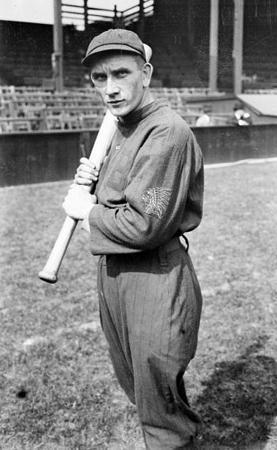
(1914) Baseball Hall of Fame member Rabbit Maranville. Maranville played his first two professional seasons for New Bedford in 1911 and 1912.

The 1913 New Bedford Whalers placed sixth in the eight-team New England League. The Whalers had a 45–76 record under returning managers Frank Connaughton and Jack O'Brien. New Bedford finished 32.0 games behind the champion Lowell Grays in the final standings.

=== Colonial League 1914 & 1915 ===
New Bedford Whalers switched leagues and finished as runner-up in the 1914 Colonial League. New Bedford did not return to the 1914 New England League, as the franchise joined the 1914 six–team Class C level Colonial League. The Brockton Shoemakers, Fall River Spindles, Pawtucket Tigers, Taunton Herrings and Woonsocket Speeders teams joined with New Bedford in league play.

Playing 1914 season under returning manager Jack O'Brien, the Whalers ended the 1914 season with a record of 60–40, finishing 2.5 games behind the first place Fall River Spindles.

The New Bedford Whalers placed third in the 1915 eight-team independent Colonial League. The Whalers ended the 1915 season with a record of 56–45, as John O'Brien served as manager, ending the season 1.0 game behind the first place Hartford Senators in a close race. In 1915, the Colonial League had essentially become the minor league feeder for the Federal League, a structure that was the downfall for the Colonial League. The Federal League was forced to fold following the 1915 season, leaving the Colonial League unable to continue following the conclusion of the season.

In the era, the "Whalers" nickname was shared by the semi-professional New Bedford Whalers soccer team, also based in the city. The team played as members of the Southern New England Soccer League from 1914 and 1918 and continued to play until 1932 in two other leagues. The team also played at Sargent Field, sharing it with the baseball team.

=== New England League 1929 & 1933 / Northeastern League 1934 ===
In 1929, New Bedford returned to minor league play. The New Bedford "Millmen" returned to play as members the eight-team Class B level New England League. The New Bedford Whalers placed third in 1929 New England League standings, finishing 12.0 games behind the first place Lynn Red Sox. With a record of 62–51, the Whalers played the season under manager Jack Ryan. The Millmen folded after the 1929 season and did not play in the 1930 New England League.

The 1933 New Bedford "Whalers" returned to play and played their final New England League season, finishing in first place. New Bedford played under manager Freddie Maguire and finished the 1933 season with a record of 58–33, placing first in the New England League regular season standings. The Whalers ended the season 2.0 games ahead of the second place Worcester team. After having the league's best record, New Bedford refused to participate in a post season playoff. Second place Worcester and third place Winchester began a playoff that was cancelled due to weather with each team winning one game. Edward Baker of New Bedford won the New England League batting title, hitting .413.

In 1934, the Whalers played their final season in a new league, joining the eight-team Class B Northeastern League, which played only the 1934 season before permanently folding. The Cambridge Cantabs, Hartford Senators, Lowell Hustlers, Manchester Indians, Springfield Ponies, Waltham Rosebuds and Watertown Townies teams joined the Whalers in beginning league play.

Playing their final season, New Bedford placed fifth in the Northeastern League standings. Playing the season under manager Jean Dubuc, the Whalers ended the season with a record of 46-60, finishing 18.5 games behind the first place Worcester Rosebuds.

After the Northeastern League folded after one season, New Bedford has not hosted another minor league team.

== The ballparks ==
In the 1895 to 1898 seasons, the New Bedford teams played home minor league games at the "Olympic Field." The ballpark was located at Kempton Street & Jenny Lind Street. Today, the site contains both commercial and residential properties.

When the Whalers resumed minor league in 1903, New Bedford began play at "Sargent Field" and would continue to host home games at the ballpark until the minor league Whalers played their final season in 1934. The ballpark had a capacity of 3,500. The Sargent Field site was first named after William E. Sargent, who was a teacher and administrator at New Bedford High School, until his death in 1910, when he was serving as principal of the school. In 1990, the athletics field site was renamed to include school board member Dr. Paul F. Walsh. The ballpark site is still in use today, located adjacent to the school at 1121 Ashley Boulevard.

== Timeline ==
Year(s)	# Yrs.	Team	Level	League	Ballpark
1895	1	New Bedford Whalers	Class B	New England League	Olympic Field
1896	1	New Bedford Browns	Class B	New England League	Olympic Field
1897–1898	2	New Bedford Whalers	Class B	New England League	Olympic Field
1903–1913	11	New Bedford Whalers	Class B	New England League	Sargent Field
1914-1915	2	New Bedford Whalers	Class C	Colonial League	Sargent Field
1929	1	New Bedford Millmen	Class B	New England League	Sargent Field
1933	1	New Bedford Whalers	Class B	New England League	Sargent Field
1934	1	New Bedford Whalers	Class B	Northeastern League	Sargent Field

== Notable alumni ==
- Rabbit Maranville (1911-1912) Inducted Baseball Hall of Fame, 1954
- Doc Amole (1904)
- Eddie Baker (1933-1934)
- Bob Barr (1933)
- Cuke Barrows (1908-1909)
- Paddy Baumann (1909-1911)
- Frank Bennett (1929)
- Jake Boyd (1898)
- Harrison Briggs (1913)
- Fred Brown (1904)
- Dan Burke (1896)
- Buster Burrell (1903-1906)
- Jack Bushelman (1910-1911)
- Jim Canavan (1906-1907, MGR)
- Win Clark (1904)
- Frank Connaughton (1912-1913, MGR)
- Dan Coogan (1898)
- Tommy Corcoran (1908, MGR)
- Jack Coveney (1904-1906; 1907, MGR)
- Tom Crooke (1915)
- Bill Cunningham (1909-1910)
- Babe Danzig (1907)
- Ira Davis (1896)
- Bill Day (1895-1898, 1904)
- Bill Deegan (1905)
- Dill Delaney (1895-1896)
- Hal Deviney (1914-1915)
- Fred Doe (1895-1896, 1898, 1903-1906 MGR)
- John Donahue (1914)
- Tommy Dowd (1909-1910, MGR)
- Jean Dubuc (1934, MGR)
- Pat Duff (1908)
- Ben Ellis (1896)
- Bill Foxen (1903)
- Danny Friend (1895, 1904-1906)
- Joe Gleason (1914-1915)
- Ed Glenn (1896-1898)
- Gene Good (1904)
- Paddy Greene (1906)
- Tommy Griffith (1909-1913)
- Joe Harrington (1898, 1904)
- Tom Hernon (1896-1897)
- Brad Hogg (1912)
- Dan Howley (1905)
- Pat Kilhullen (1912-1913)
- Fred Klobedanz (1905-1907)
- Jim Korwan (1895)
- Fred Lake (1905)
- Art LaVigne (1911)
- Ezra Lincoln (1896)
- Jim Long (1896-1897)
- Freddie Maguire (1933, MGR)
- Joe Martin (1898)
- Gene McAuliffe (1904)
- Michael McDermott (1896; 1897, MGR)
- Sandy McDermott (1896)
- Ed McDonald (1906)
- Dan McGee (1933)
- John McPherson (1986-1897)
- George McQuillan (1905)
- Bill McTigue (1910)
- George Meakim (1895)
- Frank Morrissey (1905-1906)
- Con Murphy (1897, MGR)
- Connie Murphy (1895-1896, 1903)
- Dave Murphy (1904-1905)
- Jack Ness (1911-1912)
- Charlie Nyce (1895)
- Pat O'Connor (1895)
- Andy O'Connor (1907, 1909)
- Rube Peters (1915)
- Larry Pratt (1910-1911)
- Tex Pruiett (1910-1912)
- Pop Rising (1910-1911)
- Jack Ryan (1929, MGR)
- Jack Scheible (1896)
- Crazy Schmit (1896)
- Doc Sechrist (1897-1898)
- Frank Sexton (1896-1897)
- Frank Shannon (1898)
- Jack Slattery (1896, 1909)
- Jonn Stafford (1898)
- Gene Steere (1895-1898)
- Len Swormstedt (1912)
- Wally Taylor (1905)
- Birdie Tebbetts (1934) 4x MLB All-Star
- Fred Tenney (1895)
- Walt Thomas (1909)
- Johnny Tillman (1914-1915)
- Red Torphy (1913)
- Tuck Turner (1905)
- Dike Varney (1903, 1905)
- Tom Vickery (1898)
- Bert Weeden (1908, 1913)
- Bill Whitrock (1895)
- Gary Wilson (1909-1910)
- Les Wilson (1911-1912)
- Harry Wilson (1904)
- Zeke Wilson (1895)
- Ducky Yount (1913, 1915)

== See also ==
- New Bedford Browns players
- New Bedford Millmen players
- New Bedford Whalers (baseball) players
- Sargent/Walsh Field photos
