= Stamford Pioneers =

- 1947–1949; Stamford, Connecticut

Minor league affiliations
- Class: Class B (1947–1949)
- League: Colonial League (1947–1949)

Major league affiliations
- Team: None

Minor league titles
- League titles (1): 1947
- Wild card berths (2): 1947; 1949

Team data
- Name: Stamford Bombers (1947); Stamford Pioneers (1948–1949)
- Ballpark: Mitchell Stadium (1947–1949)

The Stamford Pioneers were a minor league baseball team based in Stamford, Connecticut. From 1947 to 1949, Stamford teams played as members of the Class B level Colonial League, winning the 1947 championship with an integrated roster in the era of segregated baseball. The Pioneers were preceded by the 1947 Stamford Bombers, with the teams hosting minor league home games at Mitchell Stadium.

== History ==
=== 1888: Early Connecticut State League team ===
Stamford first hosted minor league baseball in 1888. The Stamford team played a partial season as members of the Connecticut State League after the Bridgeport Giants team relocated to Samford during the season.

=== 1947: Colonial League championship ===
A Stamford franchise was formed for the 1947 season and the Stamford "Bombers" became members of the six–team, Class B level Colonial League. The league reformed after last playing in 1915. The Bombers were joined by the Bridgeport Bees, New London Raiders, Port Chester Clippers, Poughkeepsie Giants and Waterbury Timers in beginning league play on May 7, 1947.

The Stamford franchise was owned by New York City entrepreneurs Lou Haneles and Stan Moor. Handles served as the teams' general manager and integrated the team roster in the era of segregated professional baseball. In the 1946 and 1947 minor league seasons, a total 16 black players crossed the color line in minor league baseball. Six of them were signed by Haneles to Stamford in 1947 in his tenure in the position.

On their home opening night, on May 8, 1947, 600 fans were in attendance in frigid weather at Mitchell Stadium. In pre-game festivities, Colonial League president Ken Strong caught the first ball, which was tossed by Stamford Mayor Charles E. Moore. In the opening night ballgame, Stamford defeated the visiting Waterbury Timers by the score of 16–5. In the game, Stamford's outfielder Joseph Koproski hit the first recorded Colonial League home run. Koprowski went on to hit .332 with 10 home runs and 99 RBIs on the season, his first of three with Stamford.

In the era of segregated professional baseball, Stamford the Samford roster featured six black players during the 1947 season. Pitcher Al Preston joined the Stamford club from the New York Black Yankees on August 6, 1947. Preston played for Stamford in 1947 and 1948, and was joined by Carlos Santiago, on August 10, 1947. Santiago then played for Stanford in 1948 and 1949. Johnny Haith, Roy Lee, Jr., Andre Pulliza and Fred Shepherd also played with Stamford in 1947.

In their first season of play, the Stamford Bombers won the 1947 Colonial League championship. The Bombers ended the regular season in third place with a record of 67–51, finishing 19.5 games behind the first place Waterbury Timers. Playing under player/manager Zeke Bonura, the Bombers swept the four-team Colonial League playoffs. In the first round of playoffs, the Bombers defeated the pennant winning Waterbury Timers 4 games to 3 to advance. In the finals, the Stamford Bombers defeated the New London Raiders 4 games to 1 to win the championship. Stamford's Vito DeVito led the Colonial League with 128 runs scored. Stamford pitcher Sid Schacht had 180 strikeouts to lead the league pitchers.

=== 1948 & 1949: Colonial League ===
In defending their league championship, the 1948 Pioneers finished last in the Colonial League standings. Stamford ended the 1948 season with a record of 54–78, placing sixth in the Colonial League. With their sixth place finish, the Pioneers did not qualify for the four-team playoffs as Zeke Bonura returned as the Stamford manager. The Pioneers finished 28.5 games behind the first place Port Chester Clippers. The Colonials player/manager Zeke Bonura led the Colonial League with 23 home runs and pitcher Sid Schacht posted a 2.09 ERA, to lead the league.

In their final season, the Stamford Pioneers ended the 1949 Colonial League regular season in second place. With a record of 74–52, playing the season under managers Joe Glenn and Herb Stein, the Pioneers finished 6.5 games behind the 1st place Bristol Owls in the regular season standings in the six-team league. In the playoffs, the Pioneers played their final games as the Bridgeport Bees defeated Stamford Pioneers in a seven–game series. Stamford's Jim Callahan led the Colonial League with 107 RBI, while teammates Ed Hrabczak and Emil Moscowitz each had 19 wins to lead the league. Moscowitz had a 2.01 ERA and Hrabczak 234 strikeouts, leading the league in those categories as well.

The Stamford Pioneers did not return to play in 1950, as Stamford folded following the 1949 season and did not field a team in the 1950 Colonial League. The Stamford franchise was replaced by the Torrington Braves franchise in the six-team league.

Since the 1949 Pioneers concluded play, Stamford has not hosted another minor league franchise.

== The ballpark ==
The Stamford Bombers and Stamford Pioneers hosted minor league games at Mitchell Stadium. The ballpark was also called "Mitchell Field" and had a reputation for having long grass. The ballpark was located on Magee Avenue.

== Timeline ==
Year(s)	# Yrs.	Team	Level	League	Ballpark
1947	1	Stamford Bombers	Class B	Colonial League	Mitchell Stadium
1948–1949	2	Stamford Pioneers	Class B	Colonial League	Mitchell Stadium

== Year–by–year records ==
Year	Record	Finish	Manager	Attend	Playoffs/Notes
1947	67–61	3rd	Zeke Bonura	28,697	League champions
1948	54–78	6th	Zeke Bonura	25,640	Did not qualify
1949	74–52	2nd	Joe Glenn / Herb Stein	31,092	Lost in 1st round

== Notable alumni ==
- Zeke Bonura (1947–1948, MGR)
- Joe Glenn (1949, MGR)
- Lou Haneles (1947, Owner, GM)
- Al Preston (1947–1948)
- Carlos Santiago (1947–1949)
- Sid Schacht (1947–1948)
- Fred Shepherd (1947)
- Stamford Bombers players
- Stamford Pioneers players
