= Colonial League (baseball) =

- Most recent season or competition: 1950 Colonial League season
- Classification: Class C (1914–1915); Class B (1947–1950)
- Sport: Minor League Baseball
- First season: 1914
- Folded: 1916; July 14, 1950
- President: Charles Coppen (1914–1915); Ken Strong (1947); John A. Scalzi Jr. (1948–1950)
- No. of teams: 19
- Country: United States
- Most titles: 1 Fall River Spindles (1914); Hartford Senators (1915); Stamford Bombers (1947); Port Chester Clippers (1948); Bristol Owls (1949); Poughkeepsie Chiefs (1950)

The Colonial League was the name of two mid-level American minor baseball leagues. The first Colonial League was a Class C level league that existed from 1914 to 1915 as a minor league for the outlaw Federal League. The second Colonial League existed from 1947 through mid-July 1950. It was graded Class B, two levels below the major leagues, and featured teams based in Connecticut, New York and New Jersey

== History ==
=== 1914 to 1915 ===
The Colonial League began to operate as a Class C level league based in Southern New England in the 1914 season. In April, Alexander Bannwart drew notice by acquiring Big Jeff Pfeffer to manage the team in Pawtucket, Rhode Island. By May, it was suspected that Bannwart was working as an agent of the Federal League, an outlaw league working outside of the National Agreement. Bannwart denied this. Upon these news reports, some of the founding members of the Colonial League resigned, fearing banishment by the National Baseball Commission.

Though Charles Coppen was nominally the president of the Colonial League, Bannwart began to exert authority at the Colonial League offices. Later in the 1914 season, Bannwart drew anger when he attempted to make last-minute changes to the schedule designed to increase competitiveness in the standings and maximize profits at the box office. Due to the backlash from the teams, the schedule was not changed. The league was reported to have lost $22,000 ($707,143 in current dollar terms) in 1914. After the season, Bannwart unsuccessfully petitioned the National Commission to reclassify the Colonial League as Class B.

At the April 1915 league meeting, Coppen was re-elected as president and Bannwart was elected secretary. Walter S. Ward, the treasurer of the Brooklyn Tip Tops of the Federal League and son of George S. Ward, an owner of the Tip Tops, was elected as the league's treasurer. Wanting to expand into Springfield, Massachusetts, and Hartford and New Haven, Connecticut, territory that belonged to the Eastern Association, the Colonial League reorganized itself as a farm system for the Federal League and voluntarily withdrew itself from organized baseball. The Colonial League struggled financially in 1915, and Bannwart's policies were blamed. The quality of baseball was deemed to be below the expected standards of a Class C league in part due to the salary maximums set by Bannwart, diminishing fan interest in the league. In August 1915, Bannwart resigned from the Colonial League. The league collapsed during the 1915-16 offseason.

=== 1947 to 1950 ===
The Colonial was one of many minor leagues that briefly existed during the post-World War II baseball boom. It competed in the Northeastern United States with five major league clubs in New York and New England, established minor leagues such as the International League, Eastern League, Canadian–American League, Pennsylvania–Ontario–New York League (PONY League), and other fledgling circuits such as the postwar New England League and Border League.

As a whole, the Colonial was rarely adopted as a site for farm teams for major league clubs. Only two of its member teams (the 1948 Bridgeport Bees and Port Chester Clippers) ever affiliated with a big league parent club (the Washington Senators and St. Louis Browns, respectively).

Baseball Hall of Fame member Jimmie Foxx managed Bridgeport in 1949.

As the minors began to contract in the late 1940s, the Colonial League's days were numbered. It shut its doors on July 14, 1950, with only 80,000 fans reported to have attended games in the entire six-team circuit.

== Cities represented ==
- Bridgeport, CT: Bridgeport Bees (1947–1950)
- Bristol, CT: Bristol Owls (1949–1950)
- Brockton, MA: Brockton Shoemakers (1914; Brockton Pilgrims (1915)
- Fall River, MA: Fall River Spindles (1914–1915)
- Hartford, CT: Hartford Senators (1915)
- Kingston, NY: Kingston Hubs (1948); Kingston Colonials (1949–1950)
- New Bedford, MA: New Bedford Whalers (1914–1915)
- New Brunswick, NJ: New Brunswick Hubs (1948)
- New Haven, CT: New Haven MaxFeds (1915)
- New London, CT: New London Raiders (1947)
- Pawtucket, RI: Pawtucket Tigers (1914); Pawtucket Rovers (1915)
- Port Chester, NY: Port Chester Clippers (1947–1948)
- Poughkeepsie, NY: Poughkeepsie Giants (1947); Poughkeepsie Chiefs (1948–1950)
- Springfield, MA: Springfield Tips (1915)
- Stamford, CT: Stamford Bombers (1947); Stamford Pioneers (1948–1949)
- Taunton, MA: Taunton Herrings (1914–1915)
- Torrington, CT: Torrington Braves (1950)
- Waterbury, CT: Waterbury Timers (1947–1950)
- Woonsocket, RI: Woonsocket Speeders (1914)

== Standings & statistics ==
=== 1914 to 1915 ===
1914 Colonial League

Team name	W	L	PCT	GB	Managers
Fall River Spindles	62	37	.625	–	John Kiernan
New Bedford Whalers	60	40	.600	2½	Jack O'Brien
Woonsocket Speeders	49	48	.505	12	Roy Dickenson / T.M. Walsh
Taunton Herrings	44	54	.449	17½	Ambrose Kane / Tom Gillen
Pawtucket Tigers	45	56	.446	18	Jeff Pfeffer/ Nixey Callahan / William Fortin
Brockton Shoemakers	36	61	.371	25	Willie Reardon / Bert Weeden

No Playoffs held

Player statistics
Player	Team	Stat	Tot	Player	Team	Stat	Tot
Joe Gaudette	Woonsocket	BA	.321	Johnny Tillman	New Bedford	W	21
Joe Gaudette	Woonsocket	Hits	117	Merdic McLeod	Fall River	SO	193
Aime Prouix	Taunton	Runs	92	Joe Gulden	Fall River	W Pct	.786; 11–3
John Gilmore	Pawtucket	HR	9				

1915 Colonial League

Team name	W	L	PCT	GB	Managers
Hartford Senators	55	42	.567	–	Jim Delahanty
Brockton Pilgrims	57	44	.564	-	Bert Weeden
New Bedford Whalers	56	45	.554	1	Jack O'Brien
New Haven MaxFeds	52	50	.510	5½	Bert Maxwell
Springfield Tips	47	50	.485	8	Henry Ramsey
Pawtucket Rovers	37	57	.394	16½	Jim Connor
Fall River Spindles	22	24	.478	NA	Frank Connaughton / William Phoenix
Taunton Herrings	14	28	.333	NA	Tom Gillen

Fall River & Taunton disbanded on July 10.
No playoffs held

Player statistics
Player	Team	Stat	Tot	Player	Team	Stat	Tot
Jim Delahanty	Hartford	BA	.379	Johnny Tillman	New Bedford	W	22–6
Hughie Miller	Taunton / Springfield	Hits	116	Johnny Tillman	New Bedford	SO	176
Frank Kiley	Taunton / Brockton	HR	4	Johnny Tillman	New Bedford	Pct	.786

=== 1947 to 1950 ===
1947 Colonial League
schedule

Team name	W	L	PCT	GB	Attend	Managers
Waterbury Timers	83	38	.686	–	33,946	James Acton
Poughkeepsie Giants	66	50	.569	14½	43,403	Eric McNair
Stamford Bombers	67	61	.523	19½	28,697	Zeke Bonura
New London Raiders	50	67	.427	31	27,431	Ed Butka
Port Chester Clippers	51	71	.418	32½	18,898	Al Barillari
Bridgeport Bees	46	76	.377	37½	28,320	Carmen Brunetto

Playoffs: Stamford 4 games, Waterbury 3. New London 4 games, Poughkeepsie 3. Finals: Stamford 4 games, New London 1.

Player statistics
Player	Team	Stat	Tot	Player	Team	Stat	Tot
Connie Creeden	Port Chester	BA	.395	Mike Kash	Waterbury	W	20
Connie Creeden	Port Chester	Hits	153	Sid Schacht	Stamford	SO	180
Frank LaManna	Waterbury	RBI	123	Joe Murray	Port Chester/Brid.	ERA	2.34
Frank LaManna	Waterbury	HR	21				
Vito DeVito	Stamford	Runs	128				

1948 Colonial League
schedule

Team name	W	L	PCT	GB	Attend	Managers
Port Chester Clippers	86	53	.619	–	32,198	Al Barillari
Poughkeepsie Chiefs	76	61	.555	9	38,573	Steve Mizerak
Waterbury Timers	65	68	.489	18	40,988	Mike Kash
New Brunswick Hubs/ Kingston Hubs	61	71	.462	21½	36,397	Ed Kobesky
Bridgeport Bees	61	72	.459	22	38,049	Glenn Snyder / Buddy Hall
Stamford Pioneers	54	78	.409	28½	25,640	Zeke Bonura

New Brunswick moved to Kingston on July 10.
Playoffs: Port Chester 4 games, Waterbury 1. Poughkeepsie 4 games, Kingston 1. Finals: Port Chester 4 games, Poughkeepsie 1.

Player statistics
Player	Team	Stat	Tot	Player	Team	Stat	Tot
Ed Kobesky	Brunswick/Kingston	BA	.390	Guy Coleman	Port Chester	W	17
Joseph DeToia	Poughkeepsie	Hits	157	Paul Wargo	Port Chester	SO	158
Joseph DeToia	Poughkeepsie	RBI	96	Sid Schacht	Stamford	ERA	2.09
Zeke Bonura	Stamford	HR	23				
Aldo Casadei	Waterbury	Hits	157				

1949 Colonial League
schedule

Team name	W	L	PCT	GB	Attend	Managers
Bristol Owls	82	47	.636	–	62,485	Al Barillari / Jimmy O'Connell
Stamford Pioneers	74	52	.587	6½	31,092	Joe Glenn / Herb Stein
Bridgeport Bees	73	54	.575	8	37,309	Ollie Ryers / Jim Paules / /Jimmie Foxx / Tom Downey
Waterbury Timers	62	63	.496	18	39,857	Bert Shepard / Leo Eastham
Poughkeepsie Chiefs	45	78	.366	34	25,123	Woody Williams / Elmer Weingartner; Gabe Mauro
Kingston Colonials	39	81	.325	38½	29,231	Julius Laviano / Eddie McNamara; Emil Gall

Playoffs: Bristol 4 games, Waterbury 1. Bridgeport 4 games, Stamford 3. Finals: Bristol 2 games, Bridgeport 1.

Player statistics
Player	Team	Stat	Tot	Player	Team	Stat	Tot
Leo Eastham	Waterbury	BA	.349	Emil Moscowitz	Stamford	W	19
George Handy	Bridgeport	Hits	183	Phillip Frick	Bridgeport	W	19
Jim Callahan	Stamford	RBI	107	Ed Hrabczak	Stamford	W	19
James Paules	Bridgeport	RBI	107	Emil Moscowitz	Stamford	ERA	2.01
Leo Eastham	Waterbury	HR	26	Ed Hrabczak	Stamford	SO	234
Carlos Bernier	Bristol	Runs	136				
Carlos Bernier	Bristol	SB	89				

1950 Colonial League
schedule

Team name	W	L	PCT	GB	Managers
Poughkeepsie Chiefs	43	26	.623	–	Robert Doyle
Kingston Colonials	39	28	.582	3	Emil Gall
Bristol Owls	36	31	.537	6	Al Barillari
Torrington Braves	33	32	.507	8	Merle Strachan
Waterbury Timers	23	39	.371	16½	John Morris / Charlie Bowles
Bridgeport Bees	23	41	.359	17½	Bud Stapleton / Frank Silva

No Playoffs: The League Disbanded July 16.

Player statistics
Player	Team	Stat	Tot	Player	Team	Stat	Tot
Nino Escalera	Bristol	BA	.389	Emil Moscowitz	Poughkeepsie	W	12
Nino Escalera	Bristol	Hits	93	Emil Moscowitz	Poughkeepsie	ERA	1.51
John Sinnott	Poughkeepsie	RBI	53	Emil Moscowitz	Poughkeepsie	SO	102
Carlos Bernier	Bristol	Runs	67	Denny Doyle	Poughkeepsie	SO	102
Carlos Santiago	Poughkeepsie	HR	11				
