= Cambridge Cantabs =

- 1934; Cambridge, Massachusetts

Minor league affiliations
- Class: Class B (1934)
- League: Northeastern League (1934)

Major league affiliations
- Team: None

Minor league titles
- League titles: None

Team data
- Name: Cambridge Cantabs (1934)
- Ballpark: Russell Field (1934)

The Cambridge Cantabs were a minor league baseball team based in Cambridge, Massachusetts. In 1934, the Cantabs briefly played as members of the Northeastern League before relocating during the season. The Cantabs played home games at Russell Field.

== History ==
The 1899 Cambridge Orphans played in the New England League before the franchise transferred to Lowell during the season.

In 1934, the Cambridge "Cantabs" returned to minor league play as members of the eight–team Class B level Northeastern League. Cambridge entered the league at the beginning of the second half of the season, along with the Watertown Townies, expanding the league from six teams to eight. The Hartford Senators, Lowell Hustlers, Manchester Indians, New Bedford Whalers, Springfield Ponies and Worcester Rosebuds resumed 1934 play with the two new members.

The team use of the "Cantabs" moniker was noted to have derived from Cambridge, England being known as Cantabulum, in Roman times.

On July 17, 1934, Cambridge began their schedule with a 1–12 record when the franchise moved to become the Wayland Birds. The Cambridge Cantabs/Wayland Birds of the Northeastern League ended the 1934 season with a record of 19–42, as Bill Morrell, Mack Hillis, Dick Phelan and Tom O'Brien served as managers. Wayland did not return to play in 1935.

Cambridge, Massachusetts has not hosted another minor league team.

== The ballpark ==
The Cambridge Cantabs hosted 1934 minor league home games at Russell Field. Russell Field is still in use today with a multipurpose stadium and adjacent ballfields. The site is off of Rindge Avenue in Cambridge, Massachusetts.

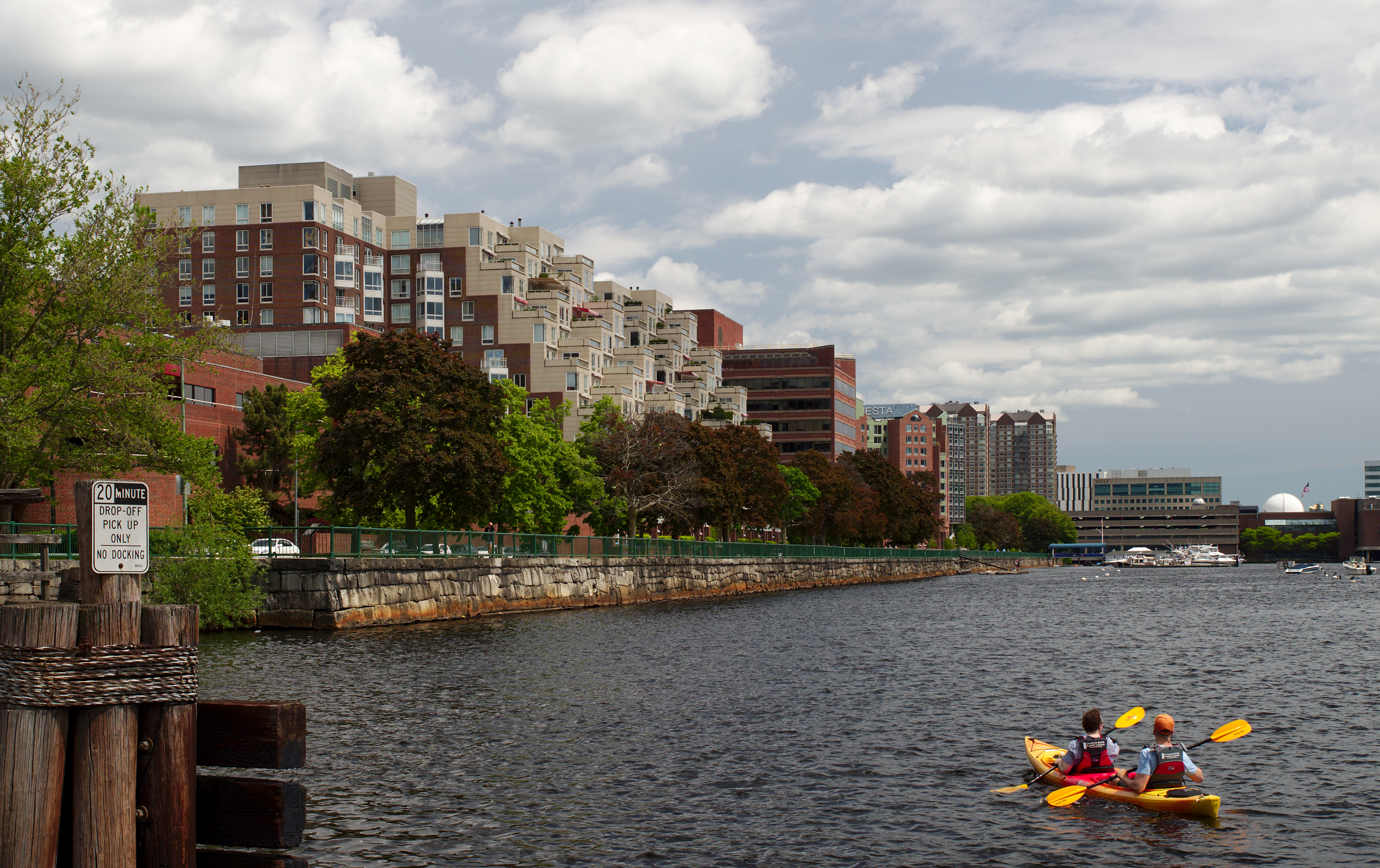
(2019) Charles River. Cambridge, Massachusetts.

== Year–by–year record ==
| Year | Record | Finish | Manager | Playoffs/notes |
|---|---|---|---|---|
| 1934 | 19–42 | 8th | Bill Morrell / Mack Hillis / Dick Phelan / Tom O'Brien | Began play in 2nd half (1–12); Moved to Wayland July 17 |

== Notable alumni ==
- Mack Hillis (1934, MGR)
- Bill Morrell (1934, MGR)
- Tom Smith (1899)

== See also ==
Cambridge Cantabs players
