= Cambridge Orphans =

- 1899; Cambridge, Massachusetts

Minor league affiliations
- Class: Class B (1899)
- League: New England League (1899)

Major league affiliations
- Team: None

Minor league titles
- League titles (0): None

Team data
- Name: Cambridge Orphans (1899)
- Ballpark: Charles River Park (1899)

The Cambridge Orphans were a minor league baseball team based in Cambridge, Massachusetts. In 1899, the Orphans briefly played as members of the New England League before relocating mid-season. The team played their home games at Charles River Park, which was later used in an unsuccessful attempt to secure a charter American League team in 1900, after the Orphans had folded.

== History ==
The 1899 Cambridge Orphans began minor league play when New England League expanded to eight teams, adding a franchise in Cambridge. The team joined the Brockton Shoemakers, Fitchburg, Manchester Manchesters, Newport Colts, Pawtucket Colts Portland Phenoms and Taunton Herrings in league play. However, the New England League folded during the season after Cambridge had relocated prior to the league folding.

On May 29, 1899, Cambridge had a 3–13 record when the franchise transferred to Lowell. The franchise quickly folded on June 1, 1899, after four games in Lowell. The Cambridge/Lowell Orphans of the New England League ended their 1899 season with an overall record of 4–16, with G.H. Spalding serving as manager in both cities. The New England League did not return to play in the 1900 season.

In 1900, Cambridge mayor Charles H. Porter led a group that attempted to secure a Boston franchise in the new American League. Porter negotiated for the club to play in Charles River Park and had selected a person to run the franchise, but the Cambridge group backed out after American League supporters met with a rival group. Consequently, Boston joined the American League in 1901 and formed today's Boston Red Sox.

The Orphans were followed in minor league play by the 1934 Cambridge Cantabs, who played as members of the eight–team Class B level Northeastern League.

== The ballparks ==
The 1899 Cambridge Orphans played minor league home games at Charles River Park. In 1900, the ballpark was a proposed location for a new American League franchise.

== Year–by–year record ==
Year	Record	Finish	Manager	Playoffs/notes
1899	4–16	NA	G.H. Spalding	Moved to Lowell May 29; 3–13 in Cambridge

== Notable alumni ==
- Ed Glenn (1899)
- Mike Mahoney (1899)
- Frank Quinlan (1899)
- Tom Smith (1899)

== See also ==
- Cambridge Orphans players
