= Port Chester Clippers =

- 1947–1948; Port Chester, New York

Minor league affiliations
- Class: Class B (1947–1948)
- League: Colonial League (1947–1948)

Major league affiliations
- Team: St. Louis Browns (1948)

Minor league titles
- League titles (1): 1948
- Conference titles (1): 1948
- Wild card berths (0): None

Team data
- Name: Port Chester Clippers (1947–1948)
- Ballpark: Empire Stadium (1947–1948)

The Port Chester Clippers were an American minor league baseball team based in Port Chester, New York. In 1947 and 1948, the "Clippers" played exclusively as members of the Class B level Colonial League, winning the 1948 league championship. The 1948 Port Chester Clippers were a minor league affiliate of the St. Louis Browns.

Port Chester hosted minor league home games at Empire Stadium.

== History ==
Minor league baseball began in Port Chester, New York in 1947 when the Port Chester "Clippers" became members of the six–team Class B level Colonial League. After folding in 1915, the Colonial League reformed in 1947. The Bridgeport Bees, New London Raiders, Poughkeepsie Giants, Stamford Bombers and Waterbury Timers joined Port Chester as members of the reformed league, beginning play on May 7, 1947.

The Port Chester use of the "Clippers" moniker corresponds with local industry and history. The city was noted to have been an important shipbuilding center with a valued port, which spurred local industry. Steamship service between Port Chester and New York City began in 1870.

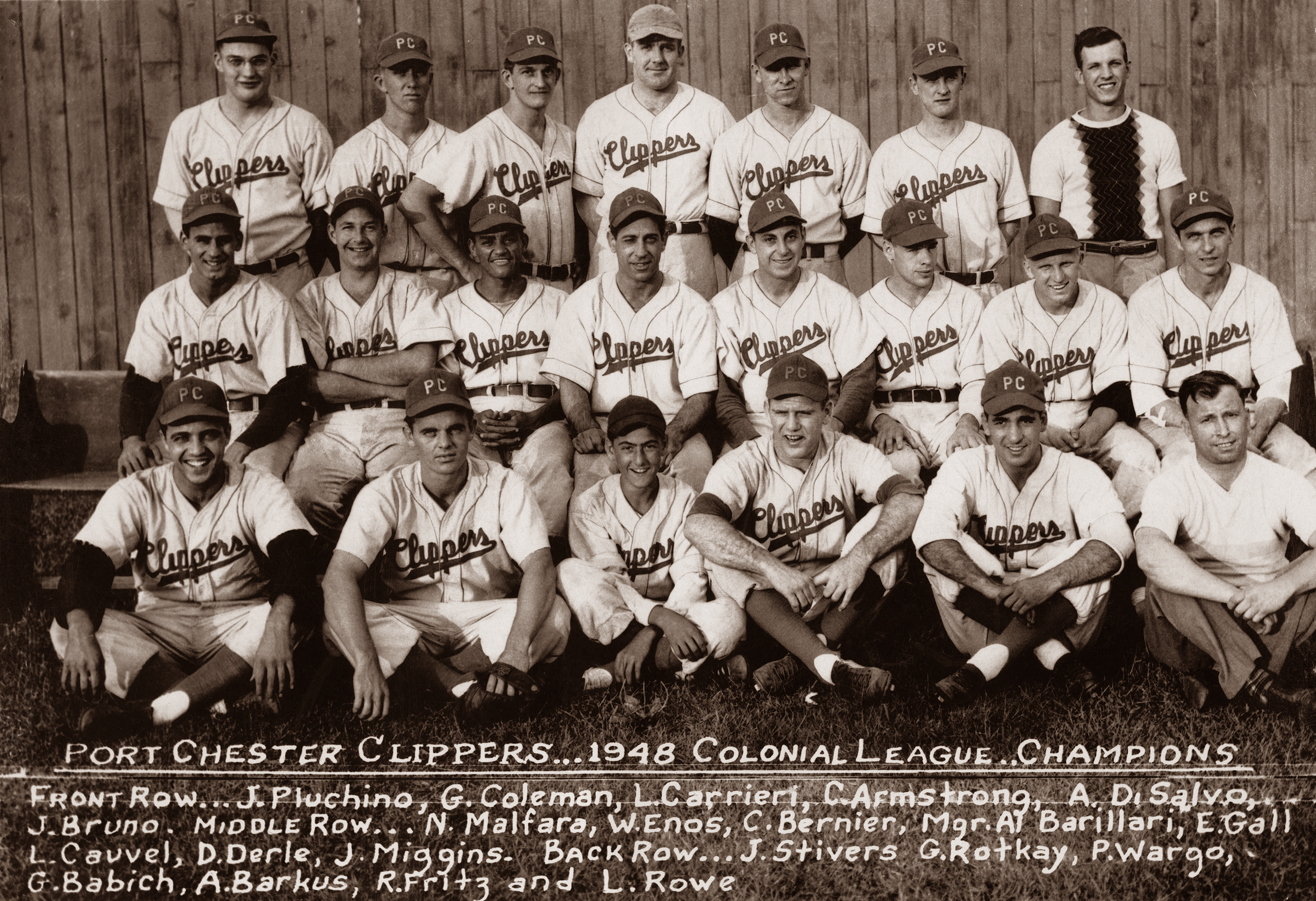
1948 Port Chester Clippers.

In their first season of play, the Port Chester Clippers placed fifth in the Colonial League. The Clippers finished the 1947 regular season with a record of 51–71, playing under manager Al Barillari and missing the four–team playoffs. Port Chester finished 32.5 games behind the pennant winning Waterbury Timers in the regular season standings. Connie Creeden of Port Chester won the Colonial League batting title, hitting .395. Creeden also led the league with 153 hits and was selected to the 1947 Colonial League All–Star team.

In their final season of play, the 1948 Port Chester Clippers became a minor league affiliate of the St. Louis Browns and won the Colonial League championship. In the 1948 regular season, the Clippers on the pennant, as their 85–35 record placed first in the regular season, playing under returning manager Al Barillari. Port Chester finished 9.0 games ahead of the second place Poughkeepsie Chiefs in the final regular season standings, which ended on September 7, 1948. In the 1948 playoffs, Port Chester defeated the Waterbury Indians 4 games to 1 to advance. In the Finals, the Clippers defeated the Poughkeepsie Chiefs 4 games to 1 to capture the championship. Pitcher Guy Coleman of Port Chester led the league with 17 wins, while teammate Paul Wargo had 158 strikeouts to lead the Colonial League. Guy Coleman (P), Joe Mellendick (OF), John Miggins (2B), John Pluchino (C), Gary Ruttkay (SS) and Paul Wargo (P) were selected to the Colonial League All-Star team.

In 1948, Port Chester Clipper Carlos Bernier was reportedly one of six black players in organized baseball to begin the season. Jackie Robinson, Larry Doby, Roy Campanella, Hank Thompson and Dan Bankhead were noted to be the other players, as Bernier played his first season of minor league baseball. Other black players began play during the 1948 season. During the 1948 season, Bernier was struck by a pitch that fractured his skull and gave him chronic headaches for the remainder of his life. Also, during the season, Bernier was suspended 6 games and fined $25 for an altercation with an umpire. On September 19, 1948, he reportedly hit an inside the park home run in a Finals game against the Poughkeepsie Chiefs.

Despite winning the 1948 championship, the Port Chester franchise did not return to the 1949 Colonial League. The Bridgeport Bees also did not return to the league, which added the Bristol Owls and Kingston Colonials as the new franchises replacing Port Chester and Bridgeport. Al Barillari managed the championship Bristol team in 1949.

Port Chester, New York has not hosted another minor league team.

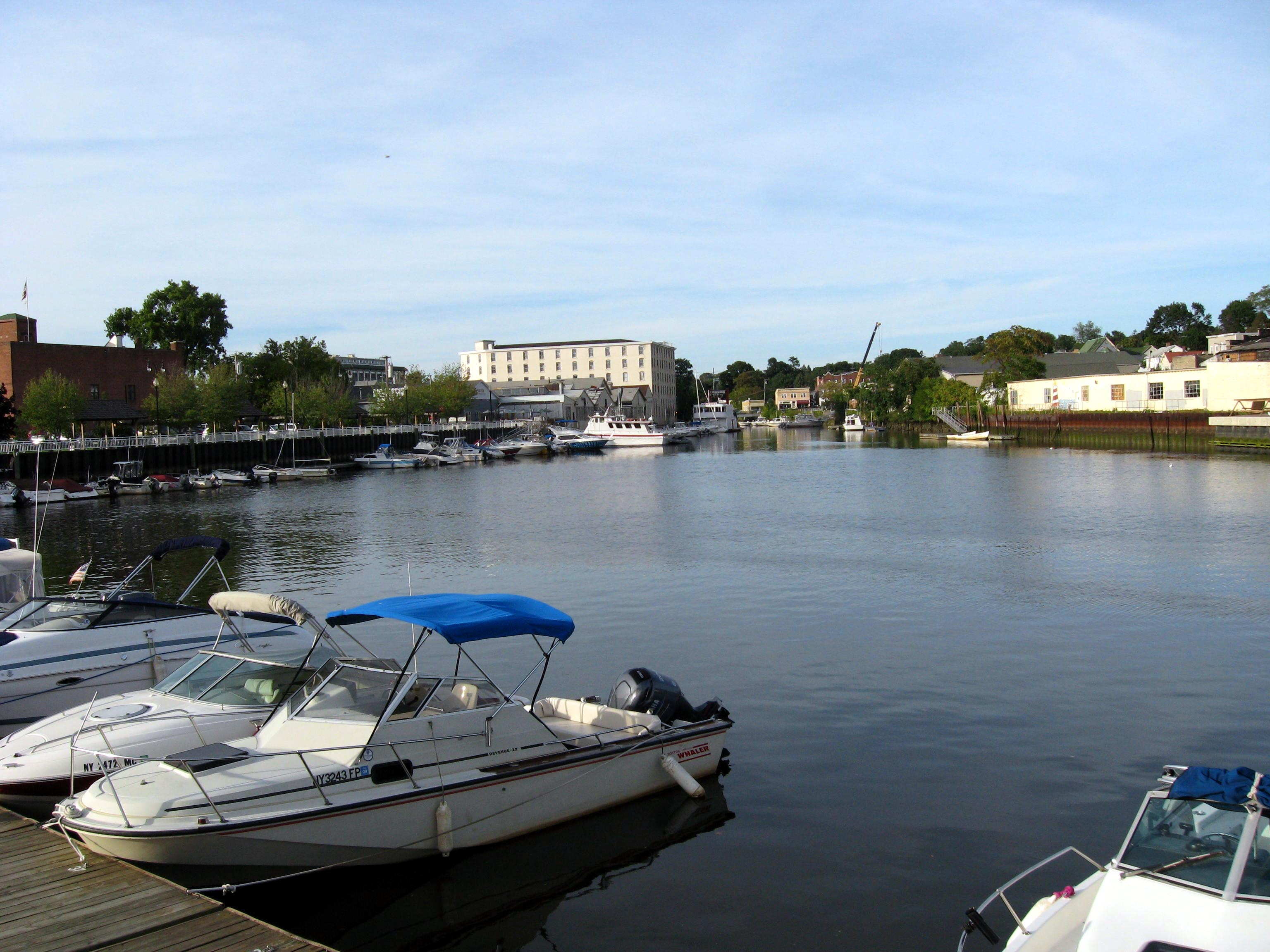
(2008) Mill Bridge. Port Chester, New York

== The ballpark ==
The Port Chester Clippers teams hosted minor league home games at Empire Stadium. The ballpark reportedly had a capacity of 3,500.

== Timeline ==
Year(s)	# Yrs.	Team	Level	League	Affiliate	Ballpark
1947	1	Port Chester Clippers	Class B	Colonial League	None	Emire Stadium
1948	1	Port Chester Clippers	Class B	Colonial League	St. Louis Browns	Emire Stadium

== Year–by–year records ==
Year	Record	Finish	Manager	Playoffs/Notes
1947	51–71	5th	Al Barillari	Did not qualify
1948	86–53	1st	Al Barillari	Won pennant League champions

== Notable alumni ==
- Al Barillari (1947–1948, MGR)
- Ed Boland (1948)
- Carlos Bernier (1948)
- Chet Covington (1948)
- Connie Creeden (1947)
- Joe Murray (1947)
- Frankie Pack (1948)

== See also ==
- Port Chester Clippers players
