= Fuessenich Park =

Baseball Field in Torrington, Connecticut

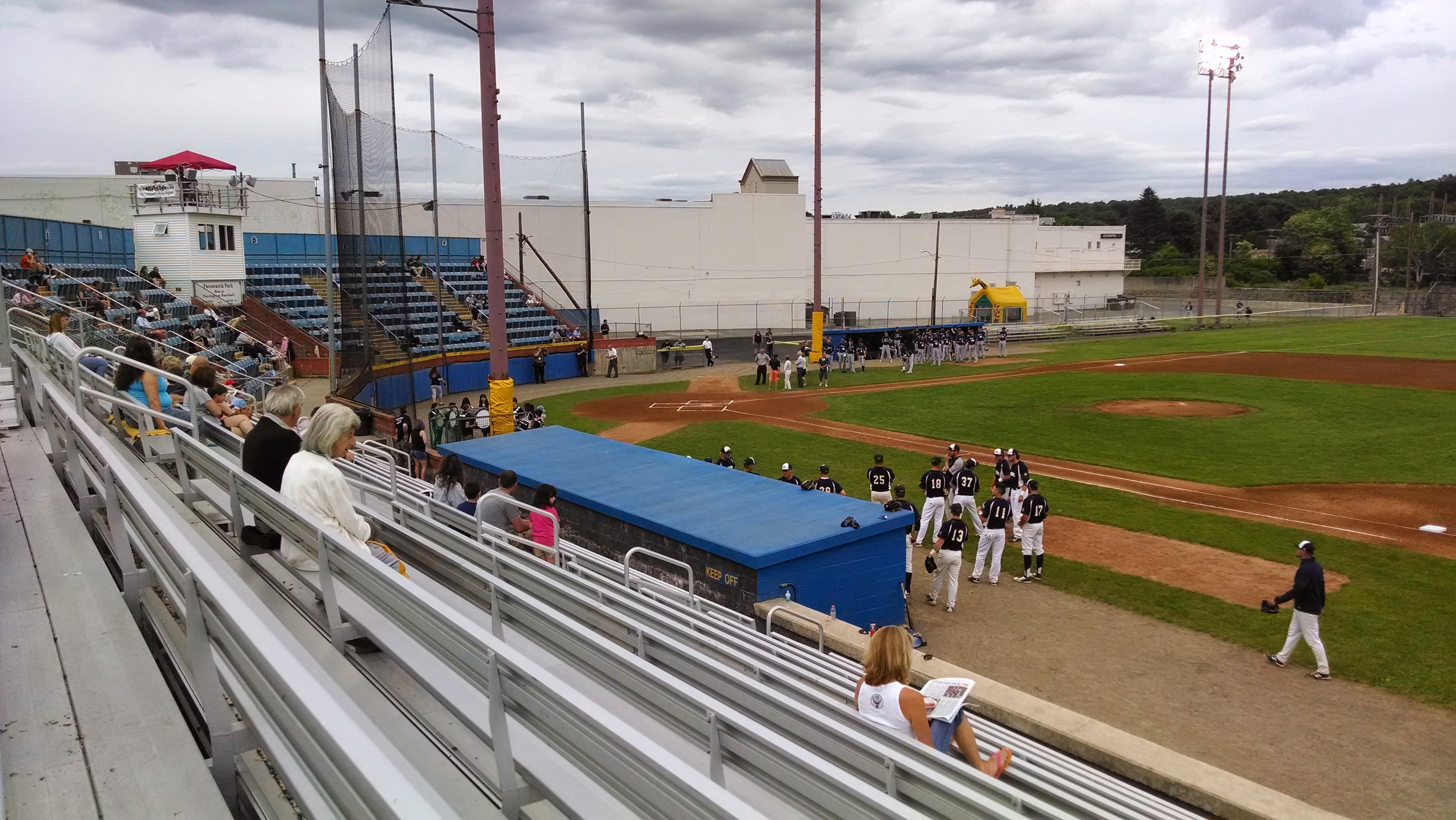
- Interactive map of Fuessenich Park
- Location: Torrington, CT
- Coordinates: 41.797958°N 73.119067°W
- Capacity: 1,500
- Surface: Grass

Tenants
- Torrington Titans (FCBL) (2010-2016); Torrington Twisters (NECBL) (1997-2008); Torrington Braves (Colonial League) (1950)

Fuessenich Park is a baseball field located in downtown Torrington, Connecticut, United States, with a capacity of 1,500 fans. Between the late 1990s and mid-2010s, the park hosted two collegiate summer baseball franchises, the Torrington Twisters and Torrington Titans

== Tenant history ==
The field was home to the Torrington Titans of the Futures Collegiate Baseball League from 2010 to 2016. Prior to the Titans, the field was home to the Torrington Twisters of the New England Collegiate Baseball League (NECBL) from 1997 to 2008. It hosted two NECBL All-Star Games, in 1998 and 2008, respectively. The park was home to the Torrington Braves of the Colonial League for the 1950 season.

The field has also been home to the American Legion Baseball League team for high school age players, the Tri-State Baseball League team for post-high school players, and additional organized baseball leagues and events for middle school and high school players.
