= Carlos Santiago =

Carlos Santiago may refer to:

- Carlos E. Santiago, Puerto Rican American labor economist and chancellor of University of Wisconsin–Milwaukee
- Carlos Manuel Santiago (1926–2008), baseball infielder, scout and general manager
- Carlos Santiago (judoka) (born 1977), judoka from Puerto Rico
