= Springfield Maroons =

Springfield Maroons may refer to sports teams based in Springfield, Massachusetts:

- the athletic teams of Springfield College, circa 1950s
- the minor league baseball team of 1895, known as the Springfield Ponies in other years
