= Watertown Townies =

- 1934; Watertown, Massachusetts

Minor league affiliations
- Class: Class B (1934)
- League: Northeastern League (1934)

Major league affiliations
- Team: None

Minor league titles
- League titles (0): None

Team data
- Name: Watertown Townies (1934)
- Ballpark: Victory Field (1934)

The Watertown Townies were a minor league baseball team based in Watertown, Massachusetts. In 1934, the Townies played a partial season as members of the Class B level Northeastern League. Watertown hosted home minor league games at Victory Field.

== History ==
Minor league baseball played its only season in Watertown, Massachusetts in 1934. The Watertown "Townies" became members of the Class B level Northeastern League during the season. The Northeastern League began play on May 16, 1934, as six–team league, playing a split–season schedule with members Hartford Senators, Lowell Honeys/Hustlers, Manchester Indians, New Bedford Whalers, Springfield Ponies and Waltham Rosebuds.

The Lowell Honeys/Hustlers won the first half–standings. At the start of the second half, the Northeastern League expanded to eight teams, adding the Watertown Townines and Cambridge Cantabs as expansion franchises. On July 17, 1934, Cambridge, with a 1–12 record, moved to become the Wayland Birds. Worcester won the second half standings and Watertown did not qualify for the playoff, finishing with a 40–28 record behind manager Bill Barrett. In the playoff Finals, Lowell won the championship over Worcester.

In a Watertown game against the Hartford Senators, Townies player Andy Spognardi got into an argument with Senators manager Pepper Rea. In the quarrel, Rea "hung a smashing right on Spognardi’s chin and laid the third baseman in the dust." Rea was ejected from the game.

Playing in his final professional season as a player, Doc Gautreau hit .388 in 43 games for Waterford at age 32.

The Northeastern League permanently folded after the 1934 season. After the season ended, league president Roger Baker, an accountant, reportedly was convicted of embezzlement from his clients and sentenced to serve time in prison. Baker owned seven of the eight Northeastern League teams and was convicted of embezzling $200,000 from a leather company.

Watertown, Massachusetts has not hosted another minor league team.

== The ballpark ==
The 1934 Watertown Townies played home minor league home games at Victory Field. Named to honor veterans of World War I, Victory Field is still in use today as a youth and high school sports venue, serving as home to Watertown High School sports teams. Victory Field is located at 40 Orchard Street, Watertown, Massachusetts.

== Year–by–year records ==
Year	Record	Finish	Manager	Playoffs/Notes
1917	40–28	2nd	Bill Barrett	Began play in second half

== Notable alumni ==
- Bill Barrett (1934, MGR)
- Doc Gautreau (1934)
- Neil Mahoney (1934)
- Andy Spognardi (1934)

== See also ==
Watertown Townies players
