= Torrington Braves =

- 1950; Torrington, Connecticut

Minor league affiliations
- Class: Class B (1950)
- League: Colonial League (1950)

Major league affiliations
- Team: None

Minor league titles
- League titles (0): None

Team data
- Name: Torrington Braves (1950)
- Ballpark: Fuessenich Park (1950)

The Torrington Braves were a short lived minor league baseball team based in Torrington, Connecticut. In 1950, the Braves played as members of the Class B level 1950 Colonial League, which permanently folded during the 1950 season with the Braves in fourth place.

The Torrington Braves hosted their home minor league games at Fuessenich Park, which is still in use today.

== History ==
Minor league baseball began in Torrington, Connecticut in 1896, when the Torrington Tornadoes became members of the Naugatuck Valley League. The 1897 Torrington Demons played the next season as members of the Connecticut League and preceded the Braves in minor league play.

After a five decade absence, minor league baseball returned to Torrington in 1950 for a partial season, when the Stamford Pioneers franchise of the Colonial League was replaced in the league by the new Torrington franchise.

The Torrington "Braves" became members of the six–team Class B level Colonial League. The Braves joined the Bridgeport Bees, Bristol Owls, Kingston Colonials, Poughkeepsie Chiefs and Waterbury Timers teams in beginning Colonial League play on May 2, 1950.

On July 16, 1950, the Braves were in fourth place when the Colonial League folded. Torrington had a record of 33–32 when the league folded, while playing the season under manager Merle Strachan. The Braves scored 303 total runs, last in the league, and surrendered 304 runs. Torrington finished 8.0 games behind the first place Poughkeepsie Chiefs in the final standings.

The Colonial League permanently folded after the 1950 season. Torrington, Connecticut has not hosted another minor league team.

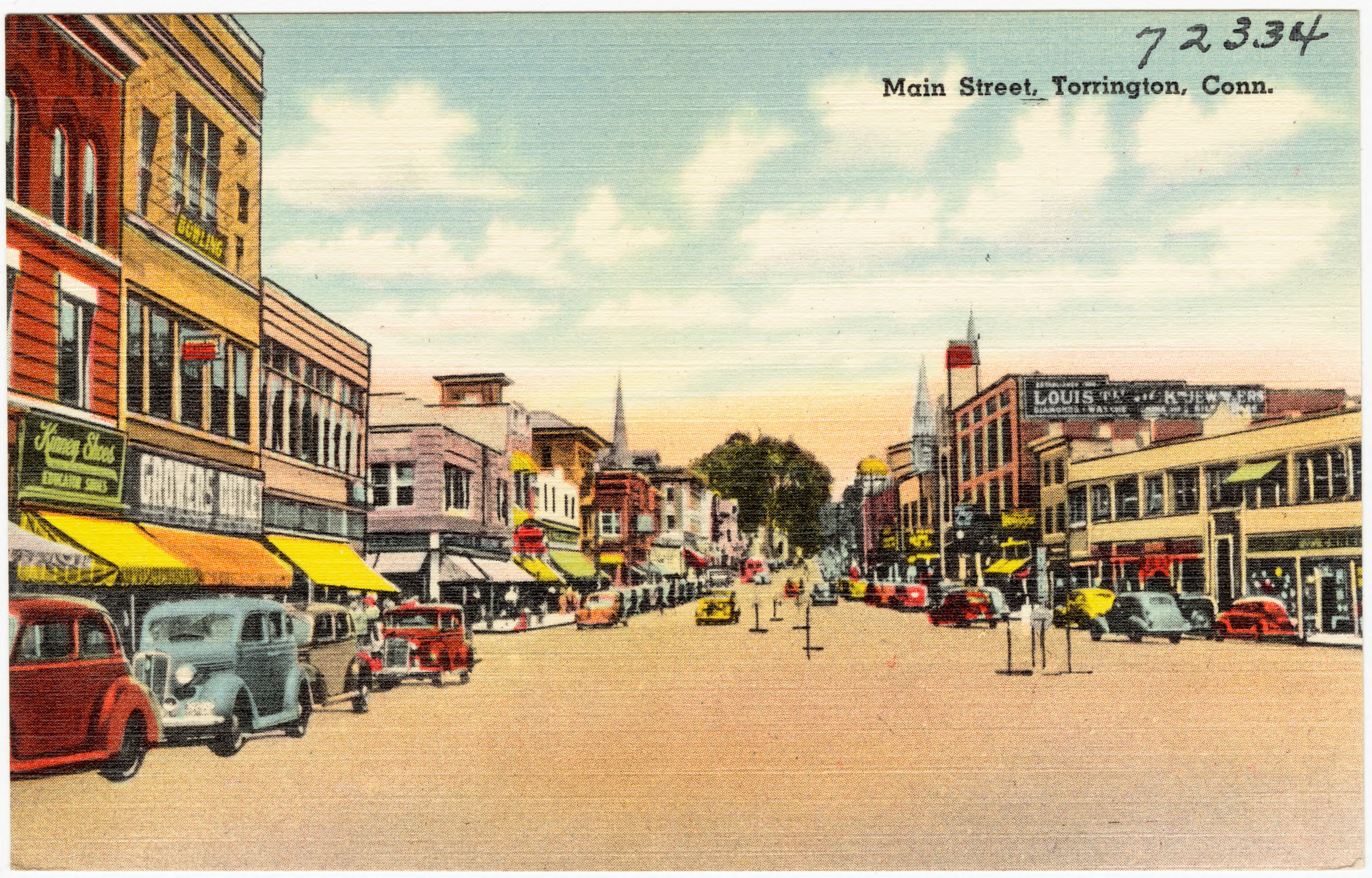
(1945) Main Street. Torrington, Connecticut

== The ballpark ==
The 1950 Torrington Braves played home minor league games at Fuessenich Park. The ballpark was previously called "League Park" and was said to have been "the first place in Torrington where baseball was played," having been in use as a public park beginning in 1838. Frederick F. Fuessenich purchased League Park in 1912 and donated it to the city in 1918. The ballpark was named for his wife, Elizabeth Blake Fuessenich, who died in 1914. Still in use as a ballpark today, Fuessnich Park is located at 33 Coe Place in Torrington, Connecticut.

== Year–by–year record ==
Year	Record	Finish	Manager	Playoffs/notes
1950	33–32	4th	Merle Strachan	League folded July 16

== Notable alumni ==
No Torrington Braves alumni appeared in the major leagues. Ed Musial, younger brother of Baseball Hall of Fame member Stan Musial played for the Braves, hitting .288 in his final professional season.
