= New London Raiders =

- 1947–1947; New London, Connecticut

Minor league affiliations
- Previous classes: Class-B
- League: Colonial League

The New London Raiders were a minor league baseball team based in New London, Connecticut that played in the Colonial League. Brothers Theodore Laviano and Dr. Gerald Laviano owned and operated the team. The Raiders were the first professional baseball team in southeastern Connecticut since the New London Planters had dropped out of the Eastern League in 1918.

== Road to the playoffs ==
In their one season of existence in 1947, the Raiders finished the regular season in fourth place with a 50-67 record and 31 games behind regular season champion Waterbury Timers. That was enough to make the playoffs. They then beat #2 seed Poughkeepsie Giants 4 games to 3 in the first round of the playoffs but lost the championship series to #3 seed Stamford Bombers 4 games to 1.

They played their home games on Mercer Field. Paid attendance in 1947 was about 30,000. Admission for adults was $0.90 for grandstand seats and $0.65 for bleacher seats. Admission for children was $0.35 for grandstand seats and $0.25 for bleacher seats.

== Players ==
Their roster feature some local players, Ray Smith, Charlie (Bucky) Yauilla, Dan Czekala and Mike Petrosky, all of whom started in the season opener, as well as Jim McKenna, Tony Osinski and Mahlon (Red) Turner. Ed Bedell, Max Goldsmith, Ed Zarolds and Preston Gómez were all selected to the All-Star team. Danny Rourke had the team's best pitching record 8-2 and Max Goldberg led the team that year with a .297 batting average. Mike Petrosky, who had been baseball and basketball captain at Georgetown University, batted .343 in 105 at bats, not enough to qualify for the batting title.

Only two players on the roster ever saw any time in the major leagues and in both cases it was before they joined the Raiders. Player/manager Ed Butka had previously played 18 games for the Washington Senators in 1943 and 1944. Preston Gómez had played 8 games for the Washington Senators in 1944 and after he retired as a player he managed in the minors leagues for 10 years before becoming 3rd base coach for the Los Angeles Dodgers in 1965. He then became the first manager for the San Diego Padres from 1969–1972, managed the Houston Astros from 1974–75, and spent part of the 1980 season as the Chicago Cubs manager. He spent the last 27 years of his career in various capacities for the Los Angeles Angels of Anaheim.

== Subsequent history of the franchise ==
Shortly before the start of the 1948 season, league president John Scalzi announced that the franchise was moving to New Brunswick, New Jersey. The reason given was the $15,000 that the club lost in the 1947. The club also experienced bad luck with weather all season, starting with the home opener having to be pushed back 4 days due to rain. This also led to the cancellation of the planned opening day festivities, which were to include NFL star Ken Strong who had been the league president in 1946. Of the Raiders 40 home games, 6 were interrupted or called off due to rain.

The New Brunswick Hubs moved to Kingston, New York for the second half of the 1948 season and changed their name to the Kingston Colonials for the 1949 season. After the Colonial League folded midway through the 1950 season they played the 1951 season in the Canadian–American League which folded at the end of that season.

== Year-by-year record ==
| Year | Record | Finish | Manager | Championship |
|---|---|---|---|---|
| 1947 | 55-74 | 6th | Eddie Butka | none |
