= Northeastern League =

- Classification: Independent (1887, 1895–1896); Class B (1934)
- Sport: Minor League Baseball
- First season: 1887
- Folded: 1934
- President: Roger E. Baker (1934)
- No. of teams: 15
- Country: United States of America
- Most titles: 1 Rutland (1887); Lowell Honeys/Hustlers (1934)

The Northeastern League was a minor league baseball league that last played in the 1934 season as an eight–team Class B level league. The 1934 league franchises were based in Connecticut, Massachusetts and New Hampshire. An earlier Northeastern League played as an Independent league in 1887 and 1895 to 1896, with teams based in New York and Vermont.

== History ==
The "Northeastern League" first played as a minor league in the 1887 season, beginning play on July 6, 1887, with the season concluding on September 5, 1887. The 1887 league was formed as an Independent league, composed of league members Burlington, Malone, Montpelier, Rutland and St. Albans. The 1887 Rutland team won the Northeastern League championship with a 16–6 record managed by James Harmon. The five–team league began play on July 6, 1887 and the Rutland was followed by St. Albans (19–9), Burlington (13–17), Malone (3–10) and Montpelier (2–13) in the final standings. The Burlington, Vermont team was managed by L.J. Smith and L.G. Burnham. Malone, New York was managed by Ryder. Montpelier, Vermont was managed by Fred Spaulding and William Lord. The Rutland, Vermont team was managed by James Harmon and St. Albans, Vermont was managed by Hunt. All the 1887 Northeastern League teams would become members of the Northern New York League, which began play in 1900. The Northeastern League played again as an Independent league in the 1895 and 1896 seasons, with teams and standings unknown.

The Northeastern League resumed play in 1934. The league played in 1934 as a Class B level league under the direction of President Roger E. Baker. The Northeastern League began play on May 16, 1934, as six–team league, playing a split–season schedule with members Hartford Senators, Lowell Honeys/Hustlers, Manchester Indians, New Bedford Whalers, Springfield Ponies and Waltham Rosebuds. On May 24, 1934, the Waltham Rosebuds, with a 6–2 record, moved to become the Worcester Rosebuds, playing their first home game in Worcester on June 1, 1934. The Lowell Honeys/Hustlers won the first half standings. At the start of the second half, the Northeastern League expanded to eight teams, adding the Watertown Townies and Cambridge Cantabs as new franchises. On July 17, 1934, Cambridge, with a 1–12 record, moved to become the Wayland Birds. Worcester won the second half standings. In the playoff Finals, Lowell won the championship 4 games to 1 over Worcester.

The Northeastern League permanently folded after the 1934 season. After the season ended, league owner Roger Baker, an accountant, reportedly was convicted of embezzlement from his clients and sentenced to serve time in prison.

== Northeastern League cities ==
- Burlington, Vermont: Burlington (1887)
- Cambridge, Massachusetts: Cambridge Cantabs (1934)
- Hartford, Connecticut: Hartford Senators (1934)
- Lowell, Massachusetts: Lowell Honeys/Hustlers (1934)
- Malone, New York: Malone (1887)
- Manchester, New Hampshire: Manchester Indians (1934)
- Montpelier, Vermont: Montpelier (1887)
- New Bedford, Massachusetts: New Bedford Whalers (1934)
- Rutland, Vermont: Rutland (1887)
- Springfield, Massachusetts: Springfield Ponies (1934)
- St. Albans, Vermont: St. Albans (1887)
- Waltham, Massachusetts: Waltham Rosebuds (1934)
- Watertown, Massachusetts: Watertown Townies (1934)
- Wayland, Massachusetts: Wayland Birds (1934)
- Worcester, Massachusetts: Worcester Rosebuds (1934)

== Standings and statistics ==
=== 1887 Northeastern League ===
Team standings	W	L	PCT	GB	Managers
Rutland	16	6	.727	–	James Harmon
St. Albans	19	9	.679	1½	Hunt
Burlington	13	17	.433	6	L.J. Smith / L.G. Burnham
Malone	2	13	.231	10½	Ryder
Montpelier	2	13	.133	11	Fred Spaulding / William Lord

=== 1934 Northeastern League ===
Team standings	W	L	PCT	GB	Managers
Waltham Rosebuds / Worcester Rosebuds	66	43	.555	–	Freddie Knight / Freddie Maguire
Lowell Hustlers	63	46	.529	3	Bill Hunnefield
Manchester Indians	58	49	.542	7	Chief Werre
Hartford Senators	50	53	.485	13	Snake Henry / Pepper Rae; Bill Morrell
New Bedford Whalers	46	60	.434	18½	Jean Dubuc
Springfield Ponies	41	62	.398	22	Bobby Murray
Watertown Townies	40	28	.588	NA	Bill Barrett
Cambridge Cantabs / Wayland Birds	19	42	.311	NA	Mack Hillis / Dick Phelan; Tom O'Brien

Player statistics
Player	Team	Stat	Tot	Player	Team	Stat	Tot
John Jones	Springfield / Worcester; Watertown	BA	.365	Gerald Gruenwald	Worcester	W	17
Thomas Adams	Springfield / Worcester	Runs	92	Frank Coleman	Hartford	SO	174
Snake Henry	Worcester	Hits	131	Jud McLaughlin	Manchester	Pct	.706; 12–5
Amit Savard	Lowell	HR	17				
