= Al Barillari =

Alfred V. Barillari (July 4, 1917 – June 25, 2000) was a New York State–born minor league baseball pitcher and multi-positional non-pitcher, minor league manager, scout for the Cleveland Indians and National Basketball Association referee.

== Playing career ==
Barillari began his professional career in 1944 and pitched in that role until 1948. He also spent time in the field during those years, fully transitioning to the field in 1948–1949. He played all over the diamond, at all infield positions, catcher and in the outfield.

As a pitcher, he went 38–31 in 121 games, winning as many as 15 games in a season. He collected at least 370 hits at the plate, hitting around .257. Perhaps his best season was 1948 with the Port Chester Clippers, when he hit .302 with five home runs in 89 games. He last played in 1956.

== Managerial career ==
Barillari managed from 1947 to 1957, skippering the Clippers (1947–1948), Bristol Owls (1949–1950), Gloversville-Johnstown Glovers (1951), Granby Phillies (1952–1953), Trois-Rivières Phillies (1954–1955), New Iberia Indians (1956), Port Arthur Sea Hawks (1956) and Port Arthur Redlegs/Temple Redlegs (1957). The led the Clippers and Sea Hawks to league championship victories in 1948 and 1956, respectively.
