= Sid Schacht =

American baseball player

- Pitcher
- Born: February 3, 1918; Bogota, New Jersey, U.S.
- Died: March 30, 1991 (aged 73); Fort Lauderdale, Florida, U.S.
- Batted: Right Threw: Right

MLB debut
- April 23, 1950, for the St. Louis Browns

Last MLB appearance
- June 26, 1951, for the Boston Braves

MLB statistics
- Win–loss record: 0–2
- Earned run average: 14.34
- Strikeouts: 12
- Innings pitched: 21⅓
- Stats at Baseball Reference

Teams
- St. Louis Browns (1950–1951); Boston Braves (1951)

Sidney Schacht (February 3, 1918 – March 30, 1991) was an American professional baseball player. He was a right-handed pitcher who appeared in 19 games in the Major Leagues for the St. Louis Browns (1950–1951) and Boston Braves (1951). Born in Bogota, New Jersey, he was Jewish, and was listed at 5 feet 11 inches (1.80 m) tall and 175 pounds (79 kg). He was not related to Al Schacht, the former pitcher and coach known as "the Clown Prince of Baseball."

== Baseball career ==
Schacht did not begin his professional baseball career until 1947, when he was 29 years old. He signed with the minor league Stamford Bombers of the Class B Colonial League. Then living in The Bronx and caring for his ailing mother, Schacht commuted 25 miles (40 km) one-way to pitch for the Bombers, and won 18 of 25 decisions with a sparkling 2.94 earned run average. The following year, Schacht dropped his ERA to 2.09, although he went only 7–8. His contract was then acquired by the Boston Red Sox, where in 1949 he compiled a 20–5 record in a season split between the Class A Eastern League and the Double-A Southern Association—with 19 of those victories coming in the EL for the Scranton Red Sox. At year's end, he was selected by the Browns in the 1949 Rule 5 draft.

He made the Browns' roster out of spring training and worked in eight big-league games during the 1950 season's early months. His only starting pitcher assignment came May 29 against another second-division club, the Chicago White Sox, and Schacht retired only two batters, allowing three hits, two bases on balls and four earned runs. He also was hit hard in relief appearances by the eventual world champion New York Yankees and first-division Red Sox. Schacht was then optioned to the Triple-A Kansas City Blues, where he pitched effectively despite a losing record.

In 1951, he again began the year on the Browns' 28-man roster, and earned his only MLB save on April 29 against the Cleveland Indians. However, Schacht was ineffective in three of his five appearances. He was placed on waivers when the rosters were cut to 25 men in mid-May and picked up by the National League Boston Braves. In six games for Boston during May and June, all in relief, Schacht allowed only one earned run, but earned two losses and then was optioned to the Triple-A Milwaukee Brewers. He went 4–1 for the minor-league Brewers, but retired from the game at age 33, after five professional seasons. In 21⅓ innings pitched in Major League Baseball, Schacht allowed 44 hits, 21 bases on balls (compiling a WHIP of 3.047) and 34 earned runs, with 12 strikeouts and an earned run average of 14.34.

He died at age 73 in Fort Lauderdale, Florida.
