= Mack Hillis =

American baseball player (1901–1961)

- Second baseman
- Born: July 23, 1901; Cambridge, Massachusetts, U.S.
- Died: June 16, 1961 (aged 59); Cambridge, Massachusetts, U.S.
- Batted: Right Threw: Right

MLB debut
- September 13, 1924, for the New York Yankees

Last MLB appearance
- September 27, 1928, for the Pittsburgh Pirates

MLB statistics
- Batting average: .243
- Home runs: 1
- Runs batted in: 7
- Stats at Baseball Reference

Teams
- New York Yankees (1924); Pittsburgh Pirates (1928)

Malcolm David "Mack" Hillis (July 23, 1901 – June 16, 1961) was an American Major League Baseball second baseman. Hillis played for the New York Yankees in 1924 and the Pittsburgh Pirates in 1928. He had 9 career hits in 37 at bats in 12 games.
