= Carlos Manuel Santiago =

Puerto Rican Professional Baseball infielder, scout and general manager (born 1926)

- Infielder
- Born: March 2, 1926; Mayagüez, Puerto Rico
- Died: December 21, 2008 (aged 82); Mayagüez, Puerto Rico
- Batted: Right Threw: Right

Puerto Rican Professional Baseball League debut
- 1944, for the Indios de Mayagüez

Teams
- Indios de Mayagüez; Leones de Ponce; Atlanta Black Crackers; New York Cubans; Stamford Pioneers; Farnham Pirates; St. Petersburg Saints; Tallahassee Rebels; Duluth Dukes; Colonial Heights-Petersburg Colts; Lincoln Chiefs; Mexico City Red Devils

Carlos Manuel Santiago (March 2, 1926 – December 21, 2008) was an infielder in Puerto Rico and Negro league baseball, and a long-time scout and general manager. He is considered one of the best second basemen in Puerto Rican baseball history. After debuting in the LBPPR in 1944, Santiago went on to break the color barrier in the Canadian Colonial League by playing with the Stanford Bombers in 1947.

== Negro league playing career ==
Santiago was selected in 1944 to play for the Puerto Rico All-Star team in the Caribbean World Series, played that season in Caracas, Venezuela. When he returned from Caracas, he signed a professional contract with the Mayagüez Indians for the 1944–45 season. Following the 1945 season, Santiago traveled to New York on a barnstorming trip with other Puerto Rican All-Stars. He was scouted by Negro league veteran John Beckwith who signed him to play for the Atlanta Black Crackers.

Midway through the 1945 season, Santiago left the Black Crackers and signed with the New York Cubans of the Negro National League. He played second base and shortstop for the Cubans in 1945 and 1946.

== 1947 to 1960 ==
In 1947, Santiago signed with the Stamford Bombers of the Class B level Colonial League. This was the same season that Jackie Robinson joined the Dodgers; Santiago was the first Afro-Caribbean Puerto Rican to break the color line in "organized" baseball. The Colonial League started in 1947 and folded on July 16, 1950. Santiago hit .341 during the abbreviated 1950 season.

In 1951 Bill Veeck and Lou Boudreau invited Santiago to Cleveland's spring training camp. However, Santiago was drafted into the U.S. Army and sent to Korea. Santiago served for 25 months and was honorably discharged as a sergeant. Santiago returned from Korea and continued playing professionally until 1960.

== Post-playing career ==
After his retirement as a player, Santiago held many positions in professional baseball. He served as a coach on the 1968–69 and 1969-70 Ponce clubs which won back-to-back championships. In 1968–69, he served as a coach to Ponce manager Rocky Bridges and in 1969–70 to manager Jim Fregosi. He was general manager of Mayagüez for three years. He served as National Instructor of Baseball in Columbia for four years. He scouted for the California Angels for three years.

Santiago was elected to the Puerto Rican Professional Baseball Hall of Fame in 1993. Until his death, he was a member of the Board of Directors of the Negro League Baseball Players Association.

He is buried in the Vivaldi de Mayagüez cemetery in Mayagüez.
