= Bill Morrell =

American baseball player (1893-1975)

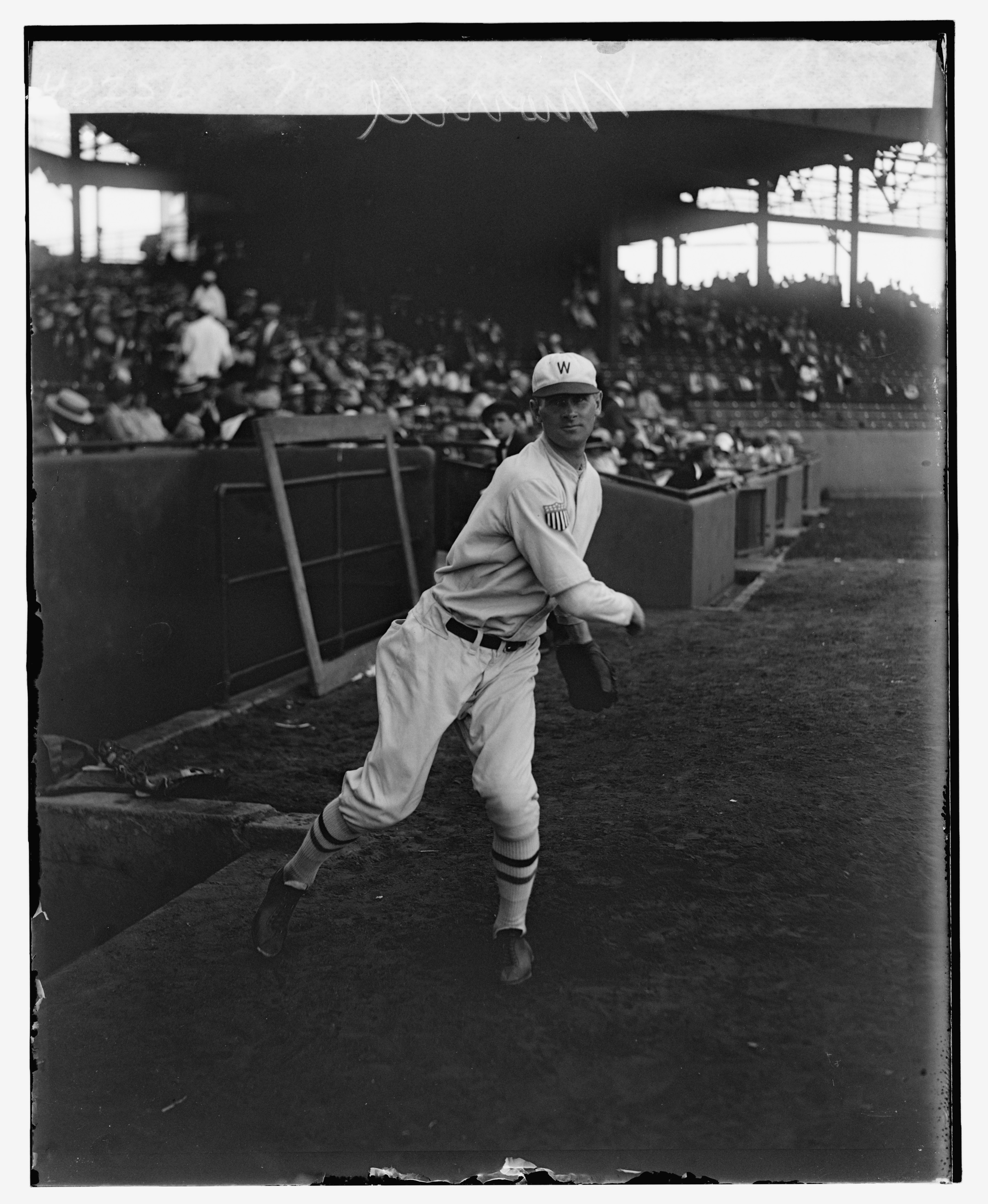
- Pitcher
- Born: April 9, 1893; Hyde Park, Massachusetts, U.S.
- Died: August 5, 1975 (aged 82); Birmingham, Alabama, U.S.
- Batted: Right Threw: Right

MLB debut
- April 20, 1926, for the Washington Senators

Last MLB appearance
- August 5, 1931, for the New York Giants

MLB statistics
- Win–loss record: 8-6
- Earned run average: 4.64
- Strikeouts: 35
- Stats at Baseball Reference

Teams
- Washington Senators (1926); New York Giants (1930–1931)

Willard Blackmer Morrell (April 9, 1893 – August 5, 1975) was an American professional baseball player. He was a right-handed pitcher over parts of three seasons (1926, 1930–31) with the Washington Senators and New York Giants. For his career, he compiled an 8-6 record, with a 4.64 earned run average, and 35 strikeouts in 143.2 innings pitched.

An alumnus of the University of Massachusetts Lowell and Tufts University, he was born in Hyde Park, Massachusetts and died in Birmingham, Alabama at the age of 82.
