= Al Preston =

American baseball player (1926–1979)

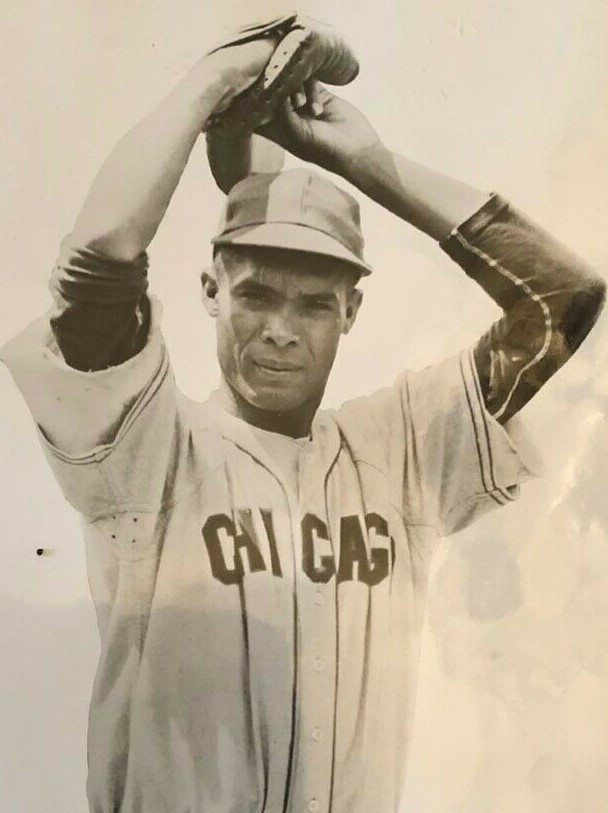
- Pitcher
- Born: June 26, 1926; New York, New York, U.S.
- Died: July 21, 1979 (aged 53); New York, New York, U.S.
- Batted: Right Threw: Right

Negro league baseball debut
- 1943, for the New York Black Yankees

Last appearance
- 1947, for the New York Black Yankees

Teams
- New York Black Yankees (1943, 1947)

Albert Webber Preston (June 26, 1926 – September 21, 1979) was an American Negro league pitcher in the 1940s.

A native of New York, New York, Preston played for the New York Black Yankees in 1943 and again in 1947. In 1950, he played minor league baseball for the Elmwood Giants of the Mandak League. Preston died in New York City in 1979 at age 53.
