= Fred Shepherd =

American baseball player

- Pitcher
- Born: September 16, 1923; Columbus, Georgia, U.S.
- Died: October 8, 1988 (aged 65); Miami, Florida, U.S.
- Batted: Right Threw: Right

Negro league baseball debut
- 1944, for the Atlanta Black Crackers

Last appearance
- 1944, for the Atlanta Black Crackers

Teams
- Atlanta Black Crackers (1944)

Frederick Lee Shepherd (September 16, 1923 – October 8, 1988), nicknamed "Tubhead", was an American Negro league outfielder in the 1940s.

A native of Columbus, Georgia, Shepherd attended Morris Brown College and played for the Atlanta Black Crackers in 1944. He died in Miami, Florida in 1988 at age 65.
