= Joe Murray (baseball) =

American baseball player (1920-2001)

- Pitcher
- Born: November 11, 1920; Wilkes-Barre, Pennsylvania, U.S.
- Died: October 19, 2001 (aged 80); San Clemente, California, U.S.
- Batted: Left Threw: Left

MLB debut
- August 17, 1950, for the Philadelphia Athletics

Last MLB appearance
- September 28, 1950, for the Philadelphia Athletics

MLB statistics
- Win–loss record: 0–3
- Earned run average: 5.70
- Strikeouts: 8

Teams
- Philadelphia Athletics (1950)

Joseph Ambrose Murray (November 11, 1920 – October 19, 2001) was an American pitcher who played in Major League Baseball during the 1950 season. Listed at 6' 0", 165 lb., Murray batted and threw left-handed. He was born in Wilkes-Barre, Pennsylvania.

At age 29, it had been a long journey to the major leagues for Joe Murray. The southpaw hurler debuted in 1940 with the Class-D Easton Yankees, an Eastern Shore League affiliate team of the New York Yankees. He would spend his next three seasons with three clubs, compiling a 35–25 record and a 3.70 earned run average in four full seasons, but his baseball career was interrupted in 1943 after he entered service in the United States Navy during World War II.

Following his discharge in 1946, Murray was part of successive transactions between the Yankees, Washington Senators and Philadelphia Athletics organizations. In 1947, he led the Class-B Colonial League with a 2.34 ERA while going 12–7 in 22 pitching appearances. His most productive season came in 1950, when he posted a 20–14 record with a 2.94 ERA and was selected for the Florida International League All-Star team.

Finally, Murray had his chance to play in the major leagues when he joined the last-place Athletics on August 17, 1950. He lost all three of his decisions in eight games (two starts), allowing 20 runs (19 earned) on 34 hits and 21 walks while striking out eight batters. He registered a 5.70 ERA in 30 innings of work.

After his brief stint with the Athletics, Murray returned to the minors and pitched from 1951 through 1953. In an eleven-season career, he finished with a 111–113 mark and a 3.87 ERA in 344 games. He later managed the Wytheville Statesmen of the Appalachian League in 1954.

When his baseball career ended, Murray went to work for Union Carbide and later worked as a construction company roofing contractor. He was a long-time resident of San Clemente, California, where he died at the age of 80.

== See also ==
- 1950 Philadelphia Athletics season
- Cup of coffee
