= Johnny Tillman =

American baseball player (1893–1964)

- Pitcher
- Born: October 6, 1893; Bridgeport, Connecticut, U.S.
- Died: April 7, 1964 (aged 70); Harrisburg, Pennsylvania, U.S.
- Batted: Right Threw: Right

MLB debut
- September 20, 1915, for the St. Louis Browns

Last MLB appearance
- September 22, 1915, for the St. Louis Browns

MLB statistics
- Win–loss record: 1-0
- Earned run average: 0.90
- Strikeouts: 6
- Stats at Baseball Reference

Teams
- St. Louis Browns (1915)

John Lawrence "Ducky" Tillman (October 6, 1893 – April 17, 1964) was an American Major League Baseball pitcher who played for the St. Louis Browns in 1915.
