= Ed Butka =

American baseball player (1916-2005)

- First baseman
- Born: January 7, 1916; Canonsburg, Pennsylvania, US
- Died: April 21, 2005 (aged 89); Pittsburgh, Pennsylvania, US
- Batted: Right Threw: Right

MLB debut
- September 26, 1943, for the Washington Senators

Last MLB appearance
- September 30, 1944, for the Washington Senators

MLB statistics
- Batting average: .220
- Home runs: 0
- Runs batted in: 2
- Stats at Baseball Reference

Teams
- Washington Senators (1943–1944)

Edward Luke Butka (January 7, 1916 – April 21, 2005), nicknamed "Babe", was an American Major League Baseball first baseman who played for the Washington Senators in 1943 and 1944.
