= Freddie Maguire =

American baseball player (1899–1961)

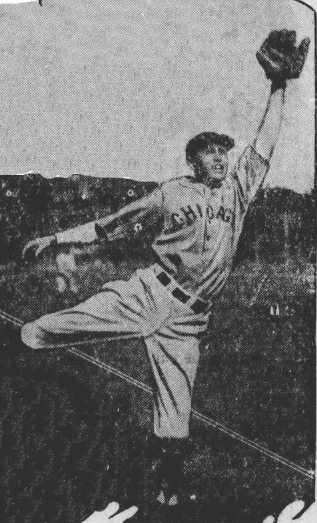
- Second baseman
- Born: May 10, 1899; Roxbury, Massachusetts, U.S.
- Died: November 3, 1961 (aged 62); Boston, Massachusetts, U.S.
- Batted: Right Threw: Right

MLB debut
- September 22, 1922, for the New York Giants

Last MLB appearance
- September 27, 1931, for the Boston Braves

MLB statistics
- Batting average: .257
- Home runs: 1
- Runs batted in: 163
- Stats at Baseball Reference

Teams
- New York Giants (1922–1923); Chicago Cubs (1928); Boston Braves (1929–1931)

Frederick Edward Maguire (May 10, 1899 – November 3, 1961) was an American professional baseball player and scout. He played six years as a second baseman in Major League Baseball: 1922–23 with the New York Giants, 1928 with the Chicago Cubs, and 1929–31 with the Boston Braves.

== Playing career ==
=== New York Giants ===
A Roxbury, Massachusetts, native, Maguire attended Boston Latin School and the College of the Holy Cross. He made his professional debut in the Major Leagues for the Giants at the end of the 1922 season, playing in five games for them that year. He spent the entire 1923 season riding the bench in New York behind Frankie Frisch, appearing in 41 games but coming to the plate just 34 times all season. He was let go at the end of the year.

=== Toledo Mud Hens ===
In 1924, Maguire got his first taste of minor league baseball, playing for the Toledo Mud Hens. He was Toledo's starting second baseman for four seasons, finishing up with a .326 average in 1927. This earned him another shot at the majors with the Cubs.

=== Chicago Cubs ===
During the previous offseason, Chicago had traded their starting third baseman, Sparky Adams, to the Pittsburgh Pirates along with outfielder Pete Scott for outfielder Kiki Cuyler. They shifted second baseman Clyde Beck over to third and installed Maguire as their starter at second. Things started off with a bang, as Maguire hit his first Major League home run on Opening Day off Cincinnati Reds pitcher Dolf Luque. It was the only run the Cubs scored that day in a 5–1 loss.

Although he did not hit another home run—and indeed would not hit another during the rest of his Major League career—Maguire did have an excellent year with the glove. He led the league in putouts and assists and second in fielding percentage among second basemen while batting .279 for the third-place Cubs. That offseason, though, Maguire was one of five players traded to the Braves for superstar Rogers Hornsby.

=== Boston Braves ===
Replacing Hornsby was a difficult task, and Maguire slumped in 1929 for the cellar-dwelling Braves, as his numbers slipped both offensively and defensively. His offensive numbers were so poor, he was what has occasionally been called a "Triple Crown loser", finishing last among qualifiers for the batting title in all three Triple Crown statistics (batting average, home runs, runs batted in).

Things did not improve much from there. Although Maguire had an uptick in average and RBI in 1930, in 1931 he finished last in all three categories again, the only player in MLB history to have done so more than once. He was let go after the season.

=== Return to the minor leagues ===
In 1932, Maguire signed with the Louisville Colonels, splitting the season between that team and the Toronto Maple Leafs. He continued to play in the minor leagues until 1938, finishing his career as a player-manager in the class-D Cape Breton Colliery League.

=== Overview ===
In six Major League seasons, Maguire played in 618 games with a .257 batting average, .322 slugging average, and a .289 on-base percentage.

== Later life ==
Maguire served as head baseball coach at Boston College from 1939 to 1949 and was a scout for the Boston Red Sox from 1950 until his sudden death on November 3, 1961.
