= Tom Smith (pitcher) =

American baseball player (1871–1929)

- Pitcher
- Born: December 5, 1871; Boston, Massachusetts, U.S.
- Died: March 2, 1929 (aged 57); Dorchester, Massachusetts, U.S.
- Batted: Right Threw: Right

MLB debut
- June 6, 1894, for the Boston Beaneaters

Last MLB appearance
- May 12, 1898, for the St. Louis Browns

MLB statistics
- Win–loss record: 4–7
- Earned run average: 6.33
- Strikeouts: 38
- Stats at Baseball Reference

Teams
- Boston Beaneaters (1894); Philadelphia Phillies (1895); Louisville Colonels (1896); St. Louis Browns (1898)

Thomas Edward Smith (December 5, 1871 – March 2, 1929) was an American pitcher in Major League Baseball. He played for the Boston Beaneaters, Philadelphia Phillies, Louisville Colonels and St. Louis Browns of the National League from 1894 to 1898. He went to college at Fordham University and the College of the Holy Cross. He later played minor league ball in the New England League in 1899 and Eastern League in 1900.
