= Connie Creeden =

American baseball player (1915–1969)

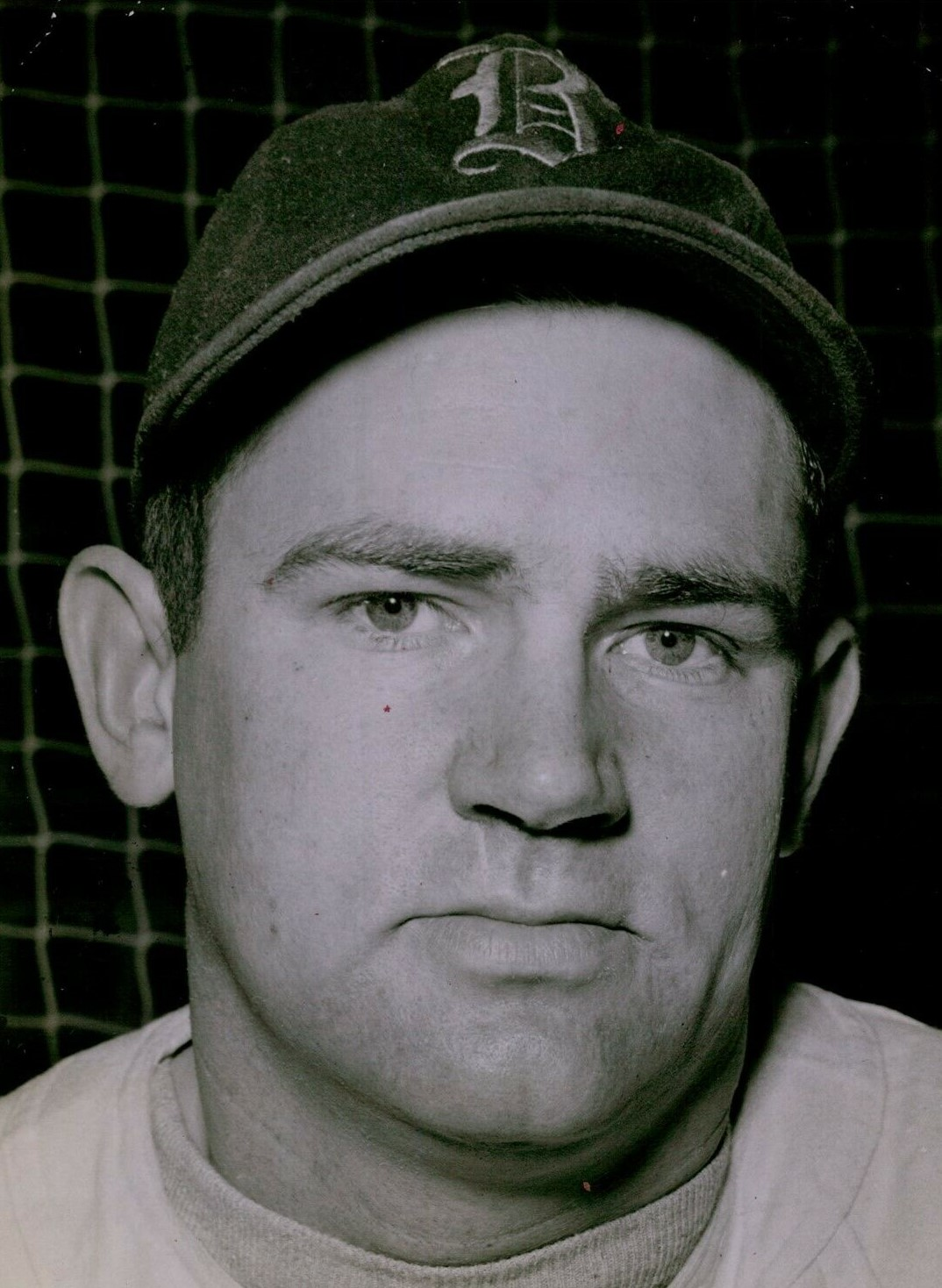
- Pinch hitter / Outfielder
- Born: July 21, 1915; Danvers, Massachusetts, U.S.
- Died: November 30, 1969 (aged 54); Santa Ana, California, U.S.
- Batted: Left Threw: Left

MLB debut
- April 28, 1943, for the Boston Braves

Last MLB appearance
- May 5, 1943, for the Boston Braves

MLB statistics
- Batting average: .250
- Home runs: 0
- Runs batted in: 1
- Stats at Baseball Reference

Teams
- Boston Braves (1943)

Cornelius Stephen Creeden (July 21, 1915 – November 30, 1969) was an American professional baseball player. He played five games in Major League Baseball with the Boston Braves in 1943.

== Biography ==
A native of Danvers, Massachusetts, Creeden attended Danvers High School and St. John's Preparatory School. Creeden played summer baseball for two seasons in the Cape Cod Baseball League (CCBL). In 1938 with Orleans, he batted over .400 to lead the CCBL. In 1939, Creeden again flirted with the .400 mark while leading Falmouth to the CCBL title. In 1941, he was appointed athletic director at the Falmouth community center.

Creeden made his major league debut with the Boston Braves in 1943. He pinch hit in five games over the span of eight days, and did not play in the field. In his five plate appearances, he recorded one hit, one walk, and one RBI. His only major league hit came on May 2 in the first game of the Braves' doubleheader against the Philadelphia Phillies at Shibe Park. With the game tied at 1–1 in the top of the ninth, Creeden delivered the game-winning RBI, a single off Phillies hurler Si Johnson that scored Chuck Workman to give the Braves the lead. Creeden was lifted for a pinch runner, and the Braves went on to win, 3–1. In the second half of the twin bill, Creeden reached base via walk off Johnny Podgajny in the 12th inning, and was again removed for a pinch runner.

Creeden spent the remainder of the 1943 season with the Hollywood Stars of the Pacific Coast League (PCL), and in 1944 played for the PCL's Seattle Rainiers. He went on to play for the Little Rock Travelers and Atlanta Crackers of the Southern Association. In the summer of 1949, Creeden played for the Galt Terriers of the semipro Intercounty League in southern Ontario.

Creeden died in Santa Ana, California in 1969 at the age of 54.
