= Springfield Ponies =

Professional baseball franchise

- (1893–1900, 1902–1932, 1934, 1939–1943); Springfield, Massachusetts

Minor league affiliations
- Class: A (1893–1900, 1919–1932, 1939–1943); B (1902–1914, 1916–1918, 1934); Independent (1915)
- League: Eastern League^{3} (1939–1943); Northeastern League (1934); Eastern League^{2} (1916–1932); Colonial League (1915); Eastern Association (1913–1914); Connecticut State League (1902–1912); Eastern League^{1} (1893–1900)

Major league affiliations
- Team: New York Giants (1943); Washington Nationals (1939); New York Yankees (1932)

Minor league titles
- League titles (2): 1895, 1927
- Pennants (4): 1895, 1908, 1911, 1932

Team data
- Previous names: Springfield Rifles (1932, 1942–1943); Springfield Nationals (1939–1941); Springfield Green Sox (1917); Springfield Tips (1915); Springfield Maroons (1895)
- Ballpark: Hampden Park

Springfield Ponies was the primary name of minor-league baseball teams based in Springfield, Massachusetts, that played between 1893 and 1943. The team competed as the Ponies through its history, except for single seasons as the Maroons (1895), Tips (1915), and Green Sox (1917), and three seasons each as the Rifles (1932, 1942–1943) and Nationals (1939–1941). The team played its home games at Pynchon Park (also known as Hampden Park).

The team was a member of several baseball leagues, including three that were known as the Eastern League. The team's longest tenure was in the second Eastern League, in which it played from 1916 to 1932. During most of its history, the team had no farm-team arrangement with a Major League Baseball team, as much of its history antedated formal affiliations. When operating as the Rifles, the team was affiliated for one season with the New York Yankees (1932) and for one season with the New York Giants (1943). When operating as the Nationals, it was affiliated with the Washington Nationals for the 1939 season.

The team finished atop league standings three times at the end of a full regular season (1895, 1908, and 1911) and once at the end of a truncated regular season (1932). The team won playoff series twice (1895 and 1927), although it played mostly in leagues without postseasons.

Three of the team's managers were later inducted to the National Baseball Hall of Fame in recognition of their major-league playing careers: Roger Connor (manager in 1902–1903), Billy Hamilton (manager in 1914), and Rabbit Maranville (manager in 1941). Two fellow inductees played for Springfield late in their careers: Dan Brouthers (1896–1899) and Jim O'Rourke (1903, 1907). Brouthers had a .415 batting average in 126 games for the Ponies in 1897.

== Earlier teams ==
Prior to 1893, teams from Springfield competed in six minor-league seasons, each in a different league:

- 1878 in the International Association
- 1879 in the National Association
- 1884 in the Massachusetts State Association
- 1885 in the Southern New England League
- 1887 in the Eastern League

These early teams were simply known as Springfield or the Springfields. The teams of 1879, 1885- and 1887 failed to complete their seasons.

== Records by season ==
The following table lists each season between 1893 and 1943, when teams from Springfield competed primarily as the Ponies.

| Year | League | Class | Record | Finish | Manager | Postseason (games) | Ref. |
|---|---|---|---|---|---|---|---|
| 1893 | Eastern League^{1} | A | 64–44 (.593) | 2nd of 8 | Thomas E. Burns | none held | |
| 1894 | Eastern League^{1} | A | 57–54 (.514) | 4th of 8 | Thomas E. Burns | none held | |
| 1895† | Eastern League^{1} | A | 79–36 (.687) | 1st of 8 | Thomas E. Burns | defeated Providence Grays (4–2) | |
| 1896 | Eastern League^{1} | A | 54–64 (.458) | 6th of 8 | Thomas E. Burns | did not qualify | |
| 1897 | Eastern League^{1} | A | 68–55 (.553) | 4th of 8 | Thomas E. Burns | did not qualify | |
| 1898 | Eastern League^{1} | A | 48–63 (.432) | 7th of 8 | Billy Lush / Billy Barnie | none held | |
| 1899 | Eastern League^{1} | A | 52–56 (.481) | 5th of 8 | Tom Brown | none held | |
| 1900 | Eastern League^{1} | A | 61–63 (.492) | 5th of 8 | Thomas E. Burns | none held | |
| 1901 | no team | | | | | | |
| 1902 | Connecticut State League | B | 65–45 (.591) | 2nd of 8 | Roger Connor | none held | |
| 1903 | Connecticut State League | B | 40–61 (.396) | 7th of 8 | Roger Connor | none held | |
| 1904 | Connecticut State League | B | 69–46 (.600) | 2nd of 8 | Daniel O'Neill | none held | |
| 1905 | Connecticut State League | B | 74–44 (.627) | 2nd of 8 | Daniel O'Neill | none held | |
| 1906 | Connecticut State League | B | 70–56 (.556) | 2nd of 8 | Daniel O'Neill | none held | |
| 1907 | Connecticut State League | B | 72–49 (.595) | 3rd of 8 | Daniel O'Neill | none held | |
| 1908 | Connecticut State League | B | 84–41 (.672) | 1st of 8 | Daniel O'Neill | none held | |
| 1909 | Connecticut State League | B | 60–63 (.488) | 5th of 8 | John Zeller | none held | |
| 1910 | Connecticut State League | B | 58–68 (.460) | 6th of 8 | John Zeller | none held | |
| 1911 | Connecticut State League | B | 71–45 (.612) | 1st of 8 | John Zeller | none held | |
| 1912 | Connecticut State League | B | 50–70 (.417) | 5th of 6 | John Zeller | none held | |
| 1913 | Eastern Association | B | 60–70 (.462) | 6th of 8 | Frank Corridon / Jack O'Hara | none held | |
| 1914 | Eastern Association | B | 63–61 (.508) | 5th of 8 | Billy Hamilton / Simon McDonald | none held | |
| 1915† | Colonial League | Ind. | 47–50 (.485) | 5th of 8 | Henry Ramsey | none held | |
| 1916 | Eastern League^{2} | B | 70–53 (.569) | 3rd of 10 | John Flynn | none held | |
| 1917† | Eastern League^{2} | B | 48–57 (.457) | 7th of 8 | William Carey / John O'Hara | none held | |
| 1918 | Eastern League^{2} | B | 21–35 (.375) | 6th of 8 | Freddy Parent | league suspended July 22 | |
| 1919 | Eastern League^{2} | A | 54–52 (.509) | 5th of 8 | Ed Holly / Jack O'Hara | none held | |
| 1920 | Eastern League^{2} | A | 74–63 (.540) | 2nd of 8 | John Flynn | none held | |
| 1921 | Eastern League^{2} | A | 70–82 (.461) | 6th of 8 | John Flynn | none held | |
| 1922 | Eastern League^{2} | A | 77–76 (.503) | 5th of 8 | John Hummel | none held | |
| 1923 | Eastern League^{2} | A | 76–77 (.497) | 4th of 8 | Patsy Donovan | none held | |
| 1924 | Eastern League^{2} | A | 87–66 (.569) | 2nd of 8 | Eugene McCann | none held | |
| 1925 | Eastern League^{2} | A | 76–76 (.500) | 5th of 8 | Eugene McCann | none held | |
| 1926 | Eastern League^{2} | A | 78–71 (.523) | 4th of 8 | Eugene McCann | none held | |
| 1927 | Eastern League^{2} | A | 86–68 (.558) | 2nd of 8 | Joe Benes | defeated Albany Senators (3–0) | |
| 1928 | Eastern League^{2} | A | 78–73 (.517) | 6th of 8 | Joe Benes | none held | |
| 1929 | Eastern League^{2} | A | 71–83 (.461) | 6th of 8 | George J. Burns | none held | |
| 1930 | Eastern League^{2} | A | 78–89 (.467) | 3rd of 8 | Kid Gleason | did not qualify | |
| 1931 | Eastern League^{2} | A | 65–74 (.468) | 3rd of 8 | Frank "Bud" Stapleton | none held | |
| 1932† | Eastern League^{2} | A | 53–26 (.671) | 1st of 8 | Billy Meyer | league disbanded July 17 | |
| 1933 | no team | | | | | | |
| 1934 | Northeastern League | B | 41–62 (.398) | 6th of 8 | Bobby Murray | did not qualify | |
| 1935– 1938 | no team | | | | | | |
| 1939† | Eastern League^{3} | A | 74–66 (.529) | 3rd of 8 | Spencer Abbott | lost in first round | |
| 1940† | Eastern League^{3} | A | 68–69 (.496) | 5th of 8 | Spencer Abbott | did not qualify | |
| 1941† | Eastern League^{3} | A | 50–85 (.370) | 8th of 8 | Rabbit Maranville | did not qualify | |
| 1942† | Eastern League^{3} | A | 33–107 (.236) | 8th of 8 | Les Bell | did not qualify | |
| 1943† | Eastern League^{3} | A | 46–88 (.343) | 7th of 8 | Spencer Abbott | did not qualify | |

† designates a year in which the team's nickname was not Ponies: 1895 as Maroons, 1915 as Tips, 1917 as Green Sox, 1939–1941 as Nationals, and 1932/1942/1943 as Rifles.

== See also ==
- Springfield Cubs, a baseball team based in Springfield from 1948 to 1953
- Springfield Green Sox players
- Springfield Maroons players
- Springfield Nationals players
- Springfield Ponies players
- Springfield Rifles players
- Springfield Tips players
