= New Britain Perfectos =

- 1908–1912; New Britain, Connecticut

Minor league affiliations
- Class: Class B (1908-1912)
- League: Connecticut State League (1908–1912)

Major league affiliations
- Team: None

Minor league titles
- League titles (0): None

Team data
- Name: New Britain Perfectos (1908–1912)
- Ballpark: Electric Park (1908-1912)

The New Britain Perfectos were a minor league baseball team based in New Britain, Connecticut. From 1908 to 1912, the Perfectos played as members of the Class B level Connecticut State League. New Britain hosted home minor league home games at Electric Park.

The New Britain "Perfectos" nickname reflected the integration of numerous Cuban players to the team roster.

== History ==
Minor league baseball play began in New Britain, Connecticut in 1884, when the "New Britain" team became members of the independent level Connecticut State League. The New Britain Perfectos were immediately preceded by the 1898 New Britain "Rangers," who played the season in the Class F level Connecticut State League. The Rangers folded during the season with a 14-38 record playing under manager Claude Gilbert.

After a nine-season hiatus, New Britain returned to minor league play in 1908, when the New Britain "Perfectos" rejoined the eight–team Class B level Connecticut State League. The Bridgeport Orators, Hartford Senators, Holyoke Papermakers, Meriden, New Haven Blues, Springfield Ponies and Waterbury Authors teams joined the Perfectos in beginning minor league play on April 28, 1908.

Under the ownership of Charles Humphrey, the team was officially called the "New Britain Baseball Club." The "Perfectos" nickname was given to the team by newspaper writers due to the arrival of four Cuban players: Armando Marsans, Rafael Almeida, Alfredo Cabrera and Luis Padrón to the team. The team was at first nicknamed the "Mountaineers" because their ballpark, Eclectic Park, was adjacent to a hillside. After playing in the Cuban Winter League, the four Cuban players arrived in Connecticut on a steamship after having been scouted by Humphrey in Cuba during the winter league season. Upon arrival in New Britain, the four players resided at Hotel Beloin, which was located at 91 Church Street in New Britain.

In their first season of play, the Perfectos placed fourth, with a final record of 61–64. Playing the season under the direction of managers William Hanna who had purchased the team, Henry Gussman and previous owner Charles Humphrey, New Britain ended their Connecticut State League season 23.0 games behind the first place Springfield Ponies in the final standings. The league held no playoffs in the era. New Britain's Jim "Swat" McCabe won the Connecticut State League batting title, hitting .320. Luis Padrón batted .314, ranking third in the league and won 18 games as a pitcher while hitting 7 home runs. Rafael Almeida hit .291 with 5 home runs and Marsans batted .274 while compiling swiping 33 stolen bases.

During the 1908 season Charles Humphrey sold the team to William Hanna. Hanna was a local businessman and owned the New Britain ice hockey team. Hanna tried new nicknames for the baseball team including "Bank Wreckers", "Clam Bakers" and "Hannaites." In December 1908, Hanna visited Almendares Park in Cuba.

The New Britain Perfectos continued league Connecticut State League play in 1909 and placed third in the final league standings. The Perfectos ended the season with a record of 64-55 in the eight-team league and finished 10.5 games behind first place Hartford. The team was managed by owner William Hanna and Tom Lynch. Swat McCabe again won the Connecticut State League batting title, hitting .366, while also leading the league with 176 total hits.

In 1910, New Britain Perfectos again finished in third place in the eight-team league. The Perfectos were managed again by William Hannah and finished the Connecticut State League season with a record of 69–55, ending the season 2.0 games behind the first place Waterbury Finnegans. Pitcher Murray Parker of New Britain led the league with an 18-11 record.

At the beginning of the 1910 season, William Hanna had sold the team to Dan O'Neil for $3.500. Serving as the manager of Springfield team, O'Neil had opposed New Britain having the Cuba players on their roster in the era of segregated baseball. As owner, O'Neil questioned the New Britain Cuban players for proof of their heritage. Ultimately, Connecticut State League president James O'Rourke declined to ban any players on the basis of their race.

In 1911, New Britain Perfectos placed fifth in the standings, ending the season 19.5 games behind the first place Springfield Ponies. Finishing with a record of 53-66, the Perfectos were managed by owner Dan O'Neil.

In June 1911, owner Dan O’Neil sold the contracts of Armando Marsans and Rafael Almeida to the Cincinnati Reds, resulting in the players becoming the first Cuban players in the National League. O’Neil received $2,000 for agreeing to sell their contracts and an additional $2,500 from Cincinnati when the transactions were complete. O’Neil then sold the New Britain franchise for $2,300 to James J. Murphy.

The Connecticut State League reduced to six teams in 1912. The New Britain Perfectos played a partial season before relocating. On June 15, 1912, New Britain, with a 12–22 record, moved to Waterbury, Connecticut where the team finished the season playing as the Waterbury Spuds. After compiling a record of 27–53 based in Waterbury, the team ended the season with an overall record of 39–75, placing sixth, while playing under manager Jack Hoey in both locations. The New Britain/Waterbury team finished 35.5 games behind the first place New Haven in the final standings.

The Connecticut State League folded following the 1912 season. After a one season hiatus, New Britain resumed hosting minor league play in 1914, when the New Britain Sinks played the season as members of the Class B level Eastern Association, finishing in last place in the eight-team league.

Currently, New Britain hosts the New Britain Bees, a collegiate summer baseball team that plays as a member of the Futures Collegiate Baseball League.

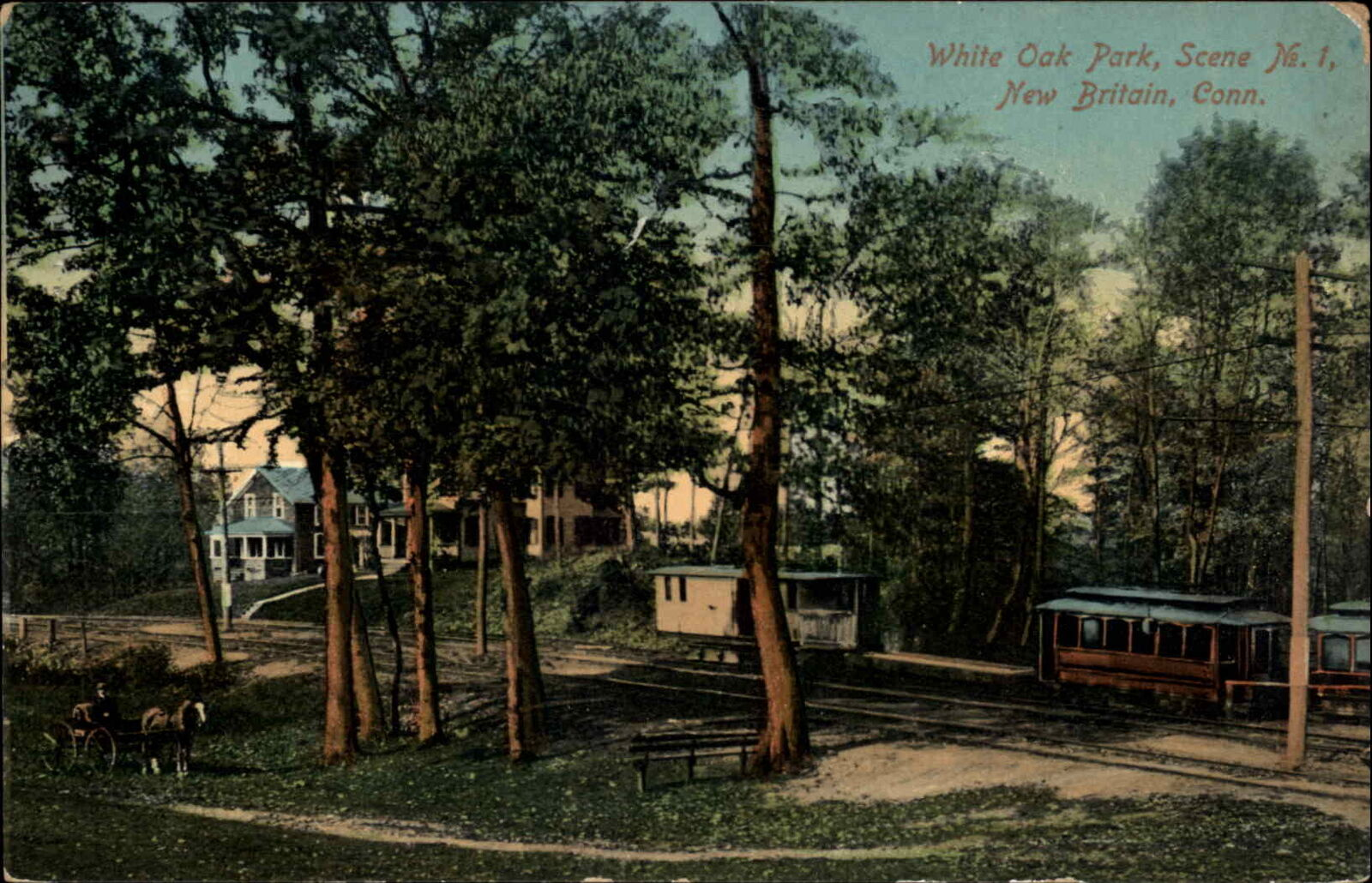
(1910) Streetcars at White Oak Park - postcard. New Britain, Connecticut.

== The ballpark ==
For their duration of play, the New Britain Perfectos hosted minor league home games at the Electric Park. The team was originally nicknamed the "Mountaineers" because the ballpark backed up to a hillside. In 1909, the grandstands were enlarged. The Electric Park ballpark sat within White Oak Park. The ballfield itself was situated over the neighboring Plainville, Connecticut boundary line. Today, the site is where the interstate 84 now divides the corridor.

== Timeline ==
Year(s)	# Yrs.	Team	Level	League	Ballpark
1908-1912	5	New Britain Perfectos	Class B	Connecticut State League	Electric Park

== Year–by–year records ==
Year	Record	Finish	Manager	Playoffs
1908	61–64	4th	Charles Humphrey / Henry Gussman; William Hanna	No playoffs held
1909	64–55	3rd	William Hanna / Tom Lynch	No playoffs held
1910	69–55	3rd	William Hanna	No playoffs held
1911	53–66	5th	Dan O'Neill	No playoffs held
1912	39–75	6th	Jack Hoey	New Britain (12–22) moved to Waterbury June 15

== Notable alumni ==
- Rafael Almeida (1908-1910)
- Boardwalk Brown (1908-1911)
- Jack Burns (1908)
- Al Cabrera (1908-1912)
- Joe Connor (1910)
- Frank Connaughton (1908)
- George Dunlop (1911)
- Steamer Flanagan (1911)
- Harry Hardy (1909)
- Jack Hoey (1911; 1912, MGR)
- Doc Kerr (1908)
- Armando Marsans (1908-1911)
- Swat McCabe (1908-1909)
- Gene Moore (1910)
- Art Nichols (1912)
- Luis Padrón (1908, 1911)
- Hack Schumann (1910)
- Tom Stankard (1910)
- Ad Yale (1911)
- New Britain Perfectos players
