= Meriden, Connecticut minor league baseball history =

Meriden, Connecticut minor league baseball teams
- 1884–1913; (1884–1886, 1888, 1891, 1895, 1897–1905, 1908, 1910, 1913); Meriden, Connecticut

Minor league affiliations
- Class: Independent (1884–1886, 1888, 1891, 1895); Class F (1897–1901); Class D (1902–1904); Class B (1905, 1908); Class D (1910); Class B (1913)
- League: Connecticut State League (1884–1885); Southern New England League (1885); Eastern League (1886); Connecticut State League (1888, 1891, 1895, 1897–1902); Connecticut League (1903); Connecticut State League (1904-1905, 1908); Connecticut Association (1910); Eastern Association (1913)

Major league affiliations
- Team: None

Minor league titles
- League titles (4): 1885 (1); 1885 (2); 1888; 1897

Team data
- Name: Meriden (1884); Meriden Maroons (1885); Meriden Silvermen (1886); Meriden (1888, 1891); Meriden Silvermen (1895); Meriden Bulldogs (1897–1898); Meriden Silverites (1899–1900); Meriden Silver Citys (1901); Meriden Silverites (1902–1905, 1908); Meriden Doublins (1910); Meriden Hopes (1913)
- Ballpark: Meriden Ball Park

Minor league baseball teams were based in Meriden, Connecticut in various seasons between 1884 and 1913. Meriden teams played as members of the Connecticut State League (1884–1885), Southern New England League (1885), Eastern League (1886), Connecticut State League (1888, 1891, 1895, 1897–1902), Connecticut League (1903), Connecticut State League (1904-1905, 1908), Connecticut Association (1910) and Eastern Association (1913).

Baseball Hall of Fame members Connie Mack (1884), Frank Grant (1887) and Ed Walsh (1902–1903) played for Meriden minor league teams.

== History ==
=== 1884 to 1898 ===
Minor league baseball play began in Meriden, Connecticut, in 1884. The Meriden team became members of the independent level Connecticut State League. Meriden ended their first season with a record of 25–22 to place second in the six–team league standings. Managed by George Lyon and Albert Boardman, Meriden finished 9.0 games behind the first place Waterbury team.

Baseball Hall of Fame member Connie Mack played for Meriden in 1884, at age 21, in his first professional season. It was reported that local lawyer and team promoter Cornelius J. Danaher, signed Cornelius McGillicuddy, Mack's given name, as catcher for a salary of $90 per month.

On September 15, 1884, it was reported that Meriden won a disputed contest against Hartford. Meriden was leading 5–3 in the 9th inning, when Hartford forfeited the game, refusing to play with a new baseball after the previous ball was hit foul into a marsh area. Earlier in the game, Connie Mack hit the only home run of the season at the Meriden Ball Park.

On July 1, 1947, the city of Meriden reportedly hosted "Connie Mack Day" as a celebration of his accomplishments in baseball. Mack was noted to have brought his Philadelphia Athletics team to Meriden "many times" to play local teams in his years of owning and managing the team. The City of Meriden placed Connie Mack in their hall of fame in 1980.

The 1885 Meriden Maroons played in two leagues during the season and won championships in both. The Maroons began the season as members of the Southern New England League. The league folded on August 25, 1885, and reformed, leaving Meriden with a 41–21 record and in first place under manager William Thomas when the league stopped play. The league then restructured to become the Connecticut State League, beginning play on August 27, 1885. The Maroons again finished first as the team compiled an 8–2 record in the remaining Connecticut State League portion of the season, continuing play under manager William Thomas.

Meriden continued minor league play in 1886, adopting the Meriden Silvermen moniker. The Silvermen became members of the eight–team Independent level Eastern League. The Meriden Silvermen franchise folded July 13, 1886, with a record of 12–34. Jack Remsen and Walter Burnham were the Meriden managers. Baseball Hall of Fame member Frank Grant played for the 1886 Meriden Silvermen, integrating the team in the era before the Negro leagues were formed and race restrictions imposed. Reportedly, Grant was one of six black players playing in the otherwise all–white baseball leagues in 1886. After the Silvermen folded, Frank Grant played the remainder of the season for the Buffalo Bisons in the International League.

In 1886, it was reported that Meriden was the smallest city in the Eastern League and that the franchise had suffered financially due to a schedule that had no weekend dates during May and only seven total home games during May, 1886. The financial hardships from lack of revenue were noted to have contributed to the franchise folding.

The Meriden team returned to minor league play in 1888, winning a championship in a shortened season. Meriden began the season, playing as members of the six–team Connecticut State League. The league folded July 25, 1888, with Meriden in first place with a 9–3 record, ending the season as Connecticut State League champions.

The Connecticut State League resumed play in 1891, with Meriden as a member of the ten–team league. The league folded June 13, 1891. Meriden was in second place with a record of 10–4, playing under manager Tom Reilly, when the league folded.

In 1895, the Meriden Silvermen became members of the four–team Connecticut State League, which played a shortened season. The Silverman compiled a record of 4–3 to place second in the league standings. Connie Miller and Tom Reilly were managers, as the Connecticut State League played from July 2, 1895, to August 31, 1895.

The 1897 Meriden Bulldogs won a championship as the franchise resumed play. Playing as members of the six–team Class F level Connecticut State League, the Bulldogs finished the season with a record of 52–21 to place first in the final standings. Jack Chapman managed the league champions, who finished 5.0 games ahead of the second place Derby Angels in the final standings. Meriden would play uninterrupted through the 1905 season.

The Meriden Bulldogs continued play in the 1898 eight–team Class F level Connecticut State League. The Bulldogs placed fifth in the standings, compiling a record of 46–48 under returning manager Jack Chapman. Meriden finished 8.0 games behind the first place Waterbury Pirates in the final standings.

=== 1899 to 1905 ===
Meriden adopted the "Meriden Silverites" moniker in 1899 and would play a predominant number of seasons under the nickname. Continuing play in the Class F level Connecticut State League, the Silverites compiled a record of 44–47, placing fifth in the eight–team league. Managed in 1899 by A. R. Penny and George Courtney, Meriden finished 9.5 games behind the first place New Haven Blues in the final standings.

Meriden, Connecticut use of the "Silverites" and their other silver related nicknames corresponds to local history and industry. Meriden is called the "Silver City." In the era, there were numerous silver companies based in Meriden, including the Meriden Britannia Company, founded in 1852.

The Silverites placed 5th in the 1900 Class F level Connecticut State League. Playing under managers Connie Miller, A.R. Penny and Tom Reilly, Meriden ended the season with a record of 47–48. The Meriden Silverites finished 16.0 games behind the first place Norwich Witches.

Adopting the Silver Citys moniker in 1901, Meriden placed fourth in the eight–team Class F level Connecticut State League. The Silver Citys compiled a record of 55–50, playing the season under the direction of returning manager Tom Reilly. Also called the "Miler" team in 1901, Meriden finished the season 10.0 games behind the first place Bristol Woodchoppers in the final league standings.

Meriden returned to the "Meriden Silverites" moniker in 1902, as the eight–team Connecticut State League became a Class D level league. Ending the season with a final record of 51–58, the Silverites placed sixth in the league. Meriden was managed by Connie Miller and Tommy Tucker. The Silverites ended the season 17.5 games behind the first place New Haven Blues team. At age 21, Baseball Hall of Fame member Ed Walsh played for the Meriden Silverites in 1902 in his first professional season. Walsh signed his first professional contract with the Meriden Silverites, earning $150 per month. Walsh ended the season with a 16–5 record and 2.31 ERA for the Silverites, pitching in 22 games.

The 1903 Meriden Silverites were the runner–up, as the league changed names for one season. Meriden ended the season with a record of 60–41 to place second in eight-team Class D level Connecticut League. Managed by Sam Kennedy, the Silverites ended the season 4.5 games behind the first place Holyoke Paperweights in the final standings. In 1903, Ed Walsh continued play with Meriden, compiling an 11–10 record with a 2.14 ERA in 21 games. Walsh began his Hall of Fame major league career the next season with the Chicago White Sox.

While playing in Meriden, Connecticut, it was noted that Ed Walsh met his wife Rosemary Carney, who sold ice cream at the ballpark in Meriden. The pair settled in Meriden, raised a family and lived there during Walsh's career in the major leagues. After his retirement from baseball, Walsh became a chemical engineer, working at a filtration plant for the Meriden municipal water department. Walsh also loved the game of golf and reportedly became the course professional in Meriden.

The Silverites finished in last place in the 1904 season. With a record of 31–84, Meriden placed eighth under manager Sam Kennedy. The Class D level league returned to "Connecticut State League" name, as Meriden finished 39.0 games behind the first place Bridgeport Orators.

1905 the Meriden Silverites placed fifth, as the Connecticut State League became a Class B level League. The Silverites ended the season with a final record of 49–64, led by returning manager Sam Kennedy. Meriden finished 19.0 games behind the first place Holyoke Paperweights. The Meriden Silverites folded after the season and did not return to play as members of the 1906 Connecticut State League.

=== 1908 to 1913 ===
After a two-season hiatus, the Meriden Silverites franchise returned to minor league play in 1908. Meriden rejoined the eight–team Class B level Connecticut State League in what was their final season as a member of the league. The Silverites placed seventh, with a final record of 54–72. Playing the season under the direction of manager Billy Lush, Meriden ended their last Connecticut State League season 30.5 games behind the first place Springfield Ponies in the standings. The Meriden franchise folded following the 1908 season and did not return to the 1909 Connecticut State League.

In 1910, Meriden, Connecticut regained a franchise for a partial season. On July 10, 1910, the Norwich Bonbons of the four–team Class D level Connecticut Association moved to Meriden with a record of 19–21. Based in Meriden, the franchise became the Meriden Doublins on July 15, 1910, playing their first home game on July 19, 1910. The team had an 0–4 record while briefly based in Meriden, as the franchise disbanded on July 24, 1910. the Norwich/Meriden team finished with an overall record of 19–25, playing under managers Dennis Hayes, John Stone and Patsy Flanagan. The Connecticut Association permanently stopped play on August 4, 1910, never to reform.

In the final season of minor league baseball, the 1913 Meriden Hopes finished last, as the team played a partial season as members of the Class B level Eastern Association. The Holyoke Papermakers, with a 24–52 record, moved to Meriden on July 11, 1913. After compiling a record of 16–43 based in Meriden, the team ended the season with an overall record of 40–95, placing eighth, playing under manager Jim Garry in both locations. The Holyoke/Meriden team finished 45.0 games behind the first place Hartford Senators in the final standings.

The Meriden franchise folded following the 1913 season and did not return to the 1914 Eastern Association. Meriden, Connecticut has not hosted another minor league team.

== The ballpark ==
For their duration of play, aside from their first season, Meriden minor league teams were noted to have hosted home games at the Meriden Ball Park. Reportedly, the ballpark opened on May 12, 1885.

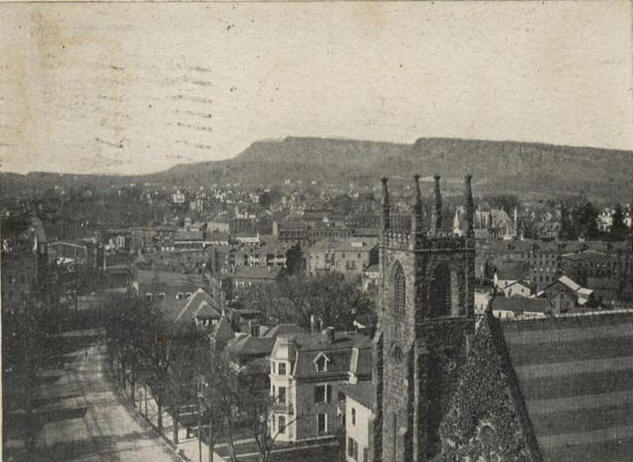
(1907) Meriden, Connecticut

== Timeline ==
| Year(s) | # Yrs. | Team | Level | League | Ballpark |
|---|---|---|---|---|---|
| 1884 | 1 | Meriden | Independent | Connecticut State League | Unknown |
| 1885 (1) | 1 | Meriden Maroons | Independent | Southern New England League | Meriden Ball Park |
| 1885 (2) | 1 | Meriden Maroons | Independent | Connecticut State League | Meriden Ball Park |
| 1886 | 1 | Meriden Silvermen | Independent | Eastern League | Meriden Ball Park |
| 1888, 1891 | 1 | Meriden | Independent | Connecticut State League | Meriden Ball Park |
| 1895 | 1 | Meriden Silvermen | Independent | Connecticut State League | Meriden Ball Park |
| 1897–1898 | 2 | Meriden Bulldogs | Class F | Connecticut State League | Meriden Ball Park |
| 1899–1900 | 3 | Meriden Silverites | Class F | Connecticut State League | Meriden Ball Park |
| 1901 | 1 | Meriden Silver Citys | Class F | Connecticut State League | Meriden Ball Park |
| 1902 | 1 | Meriden Silverites | Class D | Connecticut State League | Meriden Ball Park |
| 1903 | 1 | Meriden Silverites | Class D | Connecticut League | Meriden Ball Park |
| 1904 | 1 | Meriden Silverites | Class D | Connecticut State League | Meriden Ball Park |
| 1905, 1908 | 2 | Meriden Silverites | Class B | Connecticut State League | Meriden Ball Park |
| 1910 | 1 | Meriden Doublins | Class D | Connecticut Association | Meriden Ball Park |
| 1913 | 1 | Meriden Hopes | Class B | Eastern Association | Meriden Ball Park |

== Year–by–year records ==
| Year | Record | Finish | Manager | Playoffs |
|---|---|---|---|---|
| 1884 | 25–22 | 2nd | George Lyon / Albert Boardman | No playoffs held |
| 1885 (1) | 41–21 | 1st | William Thomas | No playoffs held League champions |
| 1885 (2) | 8–2 | 1st | William Thomas | No playoffs held League champions |
| 1886 | 12–34 | NA | Jack Remsen / Walter Burnham | Team folded July 13 |
| 1888 | 9–3 | 1st | NA | League champions League folded July 25 |
| 1891 | 10–4 | 2nd | Tom Reilly | League folded June 13 |
| 1895 | 4–3 | 2nd | Connie Miller / Tom Reilly | No playoffs held |
| 1897 | 52–21 | 1st | Jack Chapman | League champions |
| 1898 | 46–48 | 5th | Jack Chapman | No playoffs held |
| 1899 | 44–47 | 5th | A. R. Penny / George Courtney | No playoffs held |
| 1900 | 47–48 | 5th | Connie Miller; A.R. Penny / Tom Reilly | No playoffs held |
| 1901 | 55–50 | 4th | Tom Reilly | No playoffs held |
| 1902 | 51–58 | 6th | Connie Miller / Tommy Tucker | No playoffs held |
| 1903 | 60–41 | 2nd | Sam Kennedy | No playoffs held |
| 1904 | 31–84 | 8th | Sam Kennedy | No playoffs held |
| 1905 | 49–64 | 5th | Sam Kennedy | No playoffs held |
| 1908 | 54–72 | 7th | Billy Lush | No playoffs held |
| 1910 | 19–25 | NA | Dennis Hayes; John Stone / Patsy Flanagan | Norwich (19–21) moved to Meriden July 10; Team folded July 24 |
| 1913 | 40–95 | 8th | Jim Garry | Holyoke (24–52) moved to Meriden July 11 |

== Notable alumni ==
- Frank Grant (1886), Inducted Baseball Hall of Fame 2006
- Connie Mack (1884), Inducted Baseball Hall of Fame 1937
- Ed Walsh (1902), Inducted Baseball Hall of Fame 1946
- John Ake (1886)
- Dave Altizer (1902–1904)
- Ed Barney (1913)
- George Bone (1897, 1904–1905)
- Frank Burke (1902–1905)
- James Burke (1885)
- Tom Catterson (1913)
- Bill Clay (1900–1901, 1903)
- John Crowley (1885)
- John Cuff (1886)
- Tom Daly (1885)
- Dummy Deegan (1902)
- Tom Donovan (1897–1898)
- Jerry Dorgan (1884, 1886)
- Tom Downey (1902)
- Pat Duff (1910)
- Steve Dunn (1886)
- Cy Ferry (1901)
- Steamer Flanagan (1901–1903)
- Jocko Flynn (1885)
- Frank Foreman (1905)
- Frank Foutz (1899–1900)
- Jim Garry (1913, MGR)
- Charlie Gessner (1885)
- Billy Gleason (1913)
- Harry Gleason (1900)
- Joe Gunson (1885)
- Joe Harrington (1904)
- Mike Hickey (1900–1901)
- Jack Hoey (1913)
- Larry Hoffman (1903)
- Harry Howell (1898)
- Al Hubbard (1884)
- Jumping Jack Jones (1885)
- Slats Jordan (1900)
- Bill Karns (1905)
- Pete Lamer (1901)
- Billy Lauder (1895)
- Ed Lennox (1905)
- Billy Lush (1908, MGR)
- Jimmy Mathison (1900)
- Swat McCabe (1905)
- Jerry McCormick (1886)
- John Meister (1884–1885)
- George Moolic (1885)
- Willie Murphy (1885–1886)
- Gene Moriarty (1884)
- Bob Pettit (1884, 1897)
- Jack Remsen (1886)
- Dorsey Riddlemoser (1903)
- Jimmy Ryan (1884) Chicago Cubs Hall of Fame
- Spike Shannon (1900)
- Doug Smith (1913)
- Tom Stankard (1913)
- Mike Sullivan (1884–1885)
- Len Swormstedt (1913)
- Sleeper Sullivan (1886)
- Tommy Tucker (1902, MGR)
- Tom Tuckey (1908)
- Bob Unglaub (1900)
- Ham Wade (1908)
- Johnny Wanner (1913)
- John Walsh (1902)
- Gary Wilson (1898–1900)
- Pete Wilson (1913)
- Meriden Silverites players
- Meriden Bulldogs players
- Meriden Hopes players
- Meriden Maroons players
- Meriden Miler players
- Meriden Silvermen players
- Meriden (minor league baseball) players
