= Connecticut League =

Defunct American baseball league

- Classification: Independent (1884-1885, 1888, 1891); Class B (1894-1896); Class F (1897-1901); Class D (1902); Class B (1903-1912)
- Sport: Minor League Baseball
- First season: 1884
- Folded: 1912
- President: J. Howard Taylor (1888); A.W. Lang (1891); Jim O'Rourke (1895); D.W. Porter (1896); Sturgis Whitlock (1897-1898); Tim Murnane (1899); Sturgis Whitlock (1900); Tim Murnane (1901); Jim O'Rourke / Sturgis Whitlock (1902); Sturgis Whitlock (1903); Jim O'Rourke (1904-1906); W. J. Tracey (1907-1908); Jim O'Rourke (1909); W.J. Tracy (1910); Jim O'Rourke (1911-1912)
- No. of teams: 5
- Country: United States of America
- Most titles: 4 Meriden Bulldogs (1885, 1888, 1891, 1897)
- Related competitions: Connecticut Association

The Connecticut League, also known as the Connecticut State League, was a professional baseball association of teams in the state of Connecticut. The league was a minor league for most of its existence. It began as offshoot of the original Connecticut State League, which dates back as far as 1884. In 1891, the Connecticut State League included the Ansonia Cuban Giants, a team made up of entirely African-American ballplayers, including future Hall-of-Famers Frank Grant and Sol White. In 1902, it was a Class D league with teams in eight cities. In 1905, the league became Class B, which lasted until 1913, when the league became the Eastern Association due to several teams outside of the state entering the league. Also a Class B league, it survived two more seasons, then folded after the 1914 season.

== Connecticut League teams ==
- Rockland Base Ball Club — 1884. Rockland, Maine

== Cities represented ==
- Ansonia, CT: Ansonia Cuban Giants 1888, 1891; Ansonia Welcomes 1896
- Bridgeport, CT: Bridgeport Giants 1888; Bridgeport Victors 1895–96; Bridgeport Misfits 1897; Bridgeport Orators 1898–1912
- Bristol, CT: Bristol 1891; Bristol Braves 1897; Bristol Bellmakers 1899–1900; Bristol Woodchoppers 1901
- Danbury, CT: Danbury 1888; Danbury Hatters 1898
- Derby, CT: Derby Angels 1896–1898, 1900–1901; Derby Lushers 1899
- Hartford, CT: Hartford 1884; Hartford Babies 1885; Hartford Bluebirds 1895; Hartford Senators 1902–1912
- Holyoke, MA: Holyoke Paperweights 1903–1906; Holyoke Papermakers 1907–1912
- Meriden, CT: Meriden 1884 1888, 1891, 1908; Meriden Maroons 1885; Meriden Silvermen 1895; Meriden Bulldogs 1897–1898; Meriden Silverites 1899–1905
- New Britain, CT: New Britain 1884–1885, 1891; New Britain Rangers 1898; New Britain Perfectos 1908–1912
- New Haven, CT: New Haven Edgewoods 1896; New Haven Students 1898; New Haven Blues 1899–1908; New Haven Black Crows 1909; New Haven Prairie Hens 1910; New Haven Murlins 1911–1912
- New London, CT: New London Whalers 1898–1907
- Northampton, MA: Northampton Meadowlarks 1909–1911
- Norwalk, CT: Norwalk 1888
- Norwich, CT: Norwich 1891; Norwich Jackroses 1899; Norwich Witches 1900; Norwich Champs 1901; Norwich Reds 1902–1903, 1905–1907; Norwich Indians 1904
- Portland, CT: Portland 1891
- Rockville, CT: Rockville 1884
- Southington, CT: Southington 1891
- Springfield, MA: Springfield Ponies 1902–1912
- Stamford, CT: Stamford 1888
- Torrington, CT: Torrington Tornados 1896; Torrington Demons 1897
- Waterbury, CT: Waterbury 1884, 1885, 1888, 1891; Waterbury Brassmen 1895; Waterbury Indians 1897; Waterbury Pirates 1898 Waterbury Rough Riders 1899–1902; Waterbury Authors 1906–1908; Waterbury Invincibles 1909; Waterbury Finnegans 1910; Waterbury Champs 1911; Waterbury Spuds 1912
- West Haven, CT: West Haven 1891
- Willimantic, CT: Willimantic 1884
- Winsted, CT: Winsted Blues 1896
- Worcester, MA: Worcester Reds 1904

== Standings & statistics ==
=== No Classification 1884 to 1891 ===
1884 Connecticut State League

Team standings	W	L	PCT	GB	Managers
Waterbury	34	13	.723	-	S.F. Williams / Pheron Minor
Meriden	25	22	.532	9	Albert Boardman / George Lynn
Rockville	22	25	.468	12	J. Kelly / Middleton / Talcott
Hartford	20	27	.426	14	Charles Soby
New Britain	17	30	.362	17	Winchester / P.J. Markley / John A. Flynn
Willimantic	17	18	.486	NA	Bill Thomas

Willimantic expelled September 3.
League played two games each week: Wednesdays and Saturdays

Player statistics
Player	Team	Stat	Tot	Player	Team	Stat	Tot
Tom Lovett	Waterbury	W	26				

1885 Connecticut State League
(Continuation of the Southern New England League)

Team standings	W	L	PCT	GB	Managers
Meriden Maroons	8	2	.800	-	Bill Thomas
Waterbury	3	2	.600	2½	Jack (DA) Jones
Hartford Babies	3	6	.333	4½	Jack Remsen
New Britain	2	6	.250	7	William Siering

New Britain disbanded September 8

Player statistics
Player	Team	Stat	Tot	Player	Team	Stat	Tot
John Meister	Meriden	BA	.429	John Flynn	Meriden	W	5
John Meister	Meriden	Runs	13	John Flynn	Meriden	SO	35
John Meister	Meriden	Hits	18	John Flynn	Meriden	PCT	1.000 5–0
Bill Thomas	Meriden	HR	2				

1888 Connecticut State League
President: J. Howard Taylor

Team standings	W	L	PCT	GB	Managers
Meriden	9	3	.750	-	NA
Waterbury	10	7	.588	1½	Thomas Guest
Norwalk	9	7	.563	2	NA
Bridgeport Giants / Stamford	9	9	.500	3	Bullen
Ansonia Cuban Giants	4	7	.364	4½	Cos Govern
Danbury	4	13	.235	7½	L.F. Abbott

Bridgeport transferred to Stamford in May, then disbanded June 27.
Danbury disbanded June 5.
The league disbanded July 25.

1891 Connecticut State League
President: A.W. Lang

Team standings	W	L	PCT	GB	Managers
Meriden	10	4	.714	-	Thomas Reilly
Waterbury	20	9	.690	2½	Harry Durant / Tom Hayes / W.R. Mattison
New Britain	14	11	.560	8	Frank Cox
Hartford	12	11	.522	5	M.E. Fitzgerald
Ansonia Cuban Giants	8	10	.444	6½	John Brigh
Bristol-Plainville	12	15	.444	7	E.F. Belden
Norwich	10	13	.435	7	H.F. Reddy
Southington	5	7	.417	6½	James Prior
Portland	3	10	.231	9	Charles Edwards
West Haven	1	8	.111	9	E.P. Thomas

Hartford disbanded June 10; Portland disbanded June 10.

=== Class B 1894 to 1896 ===
1894 Connecticut State League
Standings unknown

1895 Connecticut State League
President: Jim O'Rourke

Team standings	W	L	PCT	GB	Managers
Bridgeport Victors	8	3	.727	-	Jim O'Rourke
Meriden Silvermen	4	3	.571	2	Miller / Reilly
Hartford Bluebirds	4	4	.500	2½	John Henry / A.F. Moran
Waterbury Brassmen	0	6	.000	5½	Durant

1896 Connecticut State League
President: D.W. Porter (aka Naugatuck Valley State League)

Team Standings	W	L	PCT	GB	Managers
Bridgeport Victors	25	15	.625	-	Jim O'Rourke
Torrington Tornados	24	16	.600	1	T.M. Burn /Candy Cummings
Derby Angels	22	18	.550	3	William Callahan / Joseph Veitch
New Haven Edgewoods	22	18	.550	3	T.R. Greist
Winsted Blues	15	25	.375	10	Eugene McCarthy; W.A. Parsons / James Eaton
Ansonia Welcomes	12	28	.300	13	Thomas Houlihan

Player statistics
Player	Team	Stat	Tot	Player	Team	Stat	Tot
Jim O'Rourke	Bridgeport	BA	.437	Dick Mansfield; Lee Viau	Bridgeport; Torrington	W	15; 15
John Doherty; Pop Foster	Bridgeport; Bridgeport	Runs	50; 50	Dick Mansfield	Bridgeport	SO	127
John Doherty	Bridgeport	Hits	70	Dick Mansfield	Bridgeport	ERA	1.95
Thomas Ivers	Bridgeport	HR	5	Dick Mansfield; Lee Viau	Bridgeport; Torrington	PCT	.682 15–7.682 15–7

=== Class F 1897 to 1901 ===
1897 Connecticut State League
President: Sturgis Whitlock

Team standings	W	L	PCT	GB	Managers
Meriden Bulldogs	52	24	.684	-	Jack Chapman
Derby Angels	40	31	.563	7½	Jerry Denny
Bridgeport Soubrettes	33	37	.471	14	Jim O'Rourke
Torrington Demons	31	39	.443	16	Ralph Bottenus / Dennis Houle
Waterbury Indians	34	43	.442	16½	John Fruin / E.O. Herendeen; Roger Connor
Bristol Braves	29	46	.373	20½	O.F. Strunz / Pete Hall

No playoffs held

Player statistics
Player	Team	Stat	Tot	Player	Team	Stat	Tot
Jim O'Rourke	Bridgeport	BA	.405				
Patsy Cunningham	Bridgeport	Runs	94				
Jim O'Rourke	Bridgeport	Hits	130				
Terry Rogers	Bridgeport	HR	12				
Terry Rogers	Bridgeport	SB	40				

1898 Connecticut State League
President: Sturgis Whitlock

Team standings	W	L	PCT	GB	Managers
Waterbury Pirates	55	38	.591	-	Roger Connor
New Haven Students	56	40	.583	½	Chippy McGarr / Thomas Reilly; M.B. Yaw / Mike Hickey / Conrad Miller
Danbury Hatters	51	43	.543	4½	Jack Rose
Bridgeport Orators	51	45	.531	5½	Tom Ivers / Jim O'Rourke
Meriden Bulldogs	46	48	.489	9½	Jack Chapman
New London Whalers	41	52	.441	14	Benjamin Kinney / John Puhl
Derby Angels	23	33	.411	NA	Jerry Denny
New Britain Rangers	14	38	.269	NA	Claude Gilbert

New Britain disbanded June 23.
Derby disbanded June 25.
No playoffs held

Player statistics
Player	Team	Stat	Tot	Player	Team	Stat	Tot
Freddy Parent	New Haven	BA	.326	Dick Mansfield	Waterbury	W	24
Freddy Parent	New Haven	Runs	96	Phil Corcoran; W.B. Morris	Bridgeport; Danbury	Pct	.739; 17–6.739 17–6
Freddy Parent	New Haven	Hits	125				
Roger Connor	Waterbury	HR	5				

1899 Connecticut State League - schedule
President: Tim Murnane

Team standings	W	L	PCT	GB	Managers
New Haven Blues	55	38	.591	-	Thomas Reilly
Waterbury Rough Riders	53	43	.552	3½	Roger Connor
Derby Lushers	51	43	.542	4½	Billy Lush / Larry Battam
Bristol Bellmakers	48	45	.516	7	John Gunshannon
Meriden Silverites	46	48	.489	9½	A.R. Penny / George Courtney
New London Whalers	45	52	.464	12	George Bindloss
[ Bridgeport Orators	43	55	.438	14½	Jim O'Rourke
Norwich Jackroses	41	58	.414	17	Jack Rose / Jack Chapman

No playoffs held

Player statistics
Player	Team	Stat	Tot	Player	Team	Stat	Tot
Roger Connor	Waterbury	BA	.392	Charles McDonald	New Haven	W	26
Roger Connor	Waterbury	Runs	79	Charles McDonald	New Haven	Pct	.703; 26–11
Freddy Parent	New Haven	Hits	138	Pete Woodruff	New Lond/Bridge	HR	11

1900 Connecticut State League
President: Sturgis Whitlock

Team standings	W	L	PCT	GB	Managers
Norwich Witches	64	33	.660	-	Fred Doe
New Haven Blues	58	39	.598	6	Jim Canavan
Bridgeport Orators	57	41	.582	7½	Jim O'Rourke
Bristol Bellmakers	48	47	.505	15	James Cooney
Meriden Silverites	47	48	.495	16	A.R. Penny; Conrad Miller / Thomas Reilly
Waterbury Rough Riders	43	53	.448	20½	Roger Connor
Derby Angels	36	60	.375	27½	Jerry Denny
New London Whalers	32	64	.333	31½	Willis Jones / Tom Hernon

No playoffs held

Player statistics
Player	Team	Stat	Tot	Player	Team	Stat	Tot
Hi Ladd	Derby	BA	.371	Danny Murphy	Norwich	Hits	138
Danny Murphy	Norwich	Runs	112	Danny Murphy	Norwich	HR	14

1901 Connecticut State League
President: Tim Murnane

Team standings	W	L	PCT	GB	Managers
Bristol Woodchoppers	63	41	.606	-	Doc Reisling
Bridgeport Orators	61	43	.587	2	Jim O'Rourke
Norwich Champs	62	46	.574	3	Jack Tighe
Meriden Silverites	56	48	.538	7	W.R. Reilly
New Haven Blues	56	54	.509	10	Jim Canavan
Waterbury Rough Riders	47	60	.439	17½	Roger Connor
New London Whalers	45	63	.417	20	Tom Hernon / John Shea
Derby Angels	37	72	.330	28½	Jerry Denny

No playoffs held

Player statistics
Player	Team	Stat	Tot	Player	Team	Stat	Tot
Patsy Dougherty	Bridgeport	BA	.375	Danny Murphy	Norwich	Runs	104
Danny Murphy	Norwich	HR	12	Hi Ladd	Derby	Hits	171
Pete Woodruff	Norwich/New London	HR	12				

=== Class D 1902 to 1904 ===
1902 Connecticut State League
President: Jim O'Rourke / Sturgis Whitlock

Team standings	W	L	PCT	GB	Managers
New Haven Blues	70	39	.642	-	Jim Canavan
Springfield Ponies	65	45	.591	5½	Roger Connor
New London Whalers	57	54	.514	14	John Shea
Hartford Senators	57	55	.509	14½	Doc Reisling
Bridgeport Orators	53	59	.473	18½	Jim O'Rourke
Norwich Reds	51	58	.469	19	Harry Davenport
Meriden Silverites	51	58	.469	19	Conrad Miller / Tom Tucker
Waterbury Rough Riders	37	73	.336	33½	George Harrington

No Playoffs.

Player statistics
Player	Team	Stat	Tot	Player	Team	Stat	Tot
Danny Hoffman	Springfield	BA	.336	Ed Walsh	Meriden	Pct	.750; 15–5
Tuck Turner	Norwich	Runs	110	Red Long	New London	ShO	7
H.E. Slater	Waterbury	Hits	147	Bob Drew	Meriden	HR	7

1903 Connecticut State League
President: Sturgis Whitlock

Team standings	W	L	PCT	GB	Managers
Holyoke Paperweights	66	37	.641	-	Pete Woodruff / Daniel O'Neill
Meriden Silverites	62	42	.595	4½	Sam Kennedy
Bridgeport Orators	59	47	.557	8½	Jim O'Rourke
New London Whalers	57	51	.528	11	John Shea / Charles Humphrey
Norwich Reds	54	50	.519	12	Dennis Morrissey
New Haven Blues	52	57	.477	17	Jim Canavan
Springfield Ponies	41	64	.370	27	Roger Connor
Hartford Senators	30	77	.280	38	Thomas Reilly

No Playoffs:
12 Holyoke games (8–4) were deducted after the season due to ineligible player violations.

Player statistics
Player	Team	Stat	Tot	Player	Team	Stat	Tot
Claude Rossman	Holyoke	BA	.385	Claude Rossman	Holyoke	Hits	158
Emil Batch	Holyoke	Runs	98	Jack Tighe	Norwich	HR	5
Tom Bannon	New London	SB	75				

1904 Connecticut League
President: Jim O'Rourke

Team standings	W	L	PCT	GB	Managers
Bridgeport Orators	71	45	.612	-	Jim O'Rourke
Springfield Ponies	69	46	.600	1½	Daniel O'Neill
New Haven Blues	69	47	.595	2	Jim Canavan
Holyoke Paperweights	58	55	.513	11½	Frank Fitzpatrick; P. Prindiville / Fred Winkler
New London Whalers	56	60	.483	15	Charles Humphrey
Hartford Senators	53	61	.465	17	William Kennedy
Worcester Reds / Norwich Indians	53	62	.461	17½	Mal Kittridge / Robert Tracey; Jack Tighe / Fred Crolius
Meriden Silverites	31	84	.270	39½	Sam Kennedy

Worcester (26–11) moved to Norwich June 21.
No Playoffs.

Player statistics
Player	Team	Stat	Tot	Player	Team	Stat	Tot
Pop Foster	Bridgeport	BA	.376	Pop Foster	Bridgeport	Hits	158
Royal Clark	Bridgeport	Runs	101	Emil Batch	Holyoke	HR	7
Bill Foxen	Hartford	SO's	180				

=== Class B 1905 to 1912 ===
1905 Connecticut State League
President: Jim O'Rourke

Team standings	W	L	PCT	GB	Managers
Holyoke Paperweights	79	35	.693	-	Jesse Freysinger
Springfield Ponies	74	44	.627	7	Daniel O'Neill
Bridgeport Orators	64	50	.561	15	Jim O'Rourke
Hartford Senators	58	56	.509	21	William Kennedy
Meriden Silverites	49	64	.434	29½	Sam Kennedy
New London Whalers	49	68	.419	31½	Charles Humphrey
New Haven Blues	46	70	.397	34	Jim Canavan / Jack Tighe
Norwich Reds	42	74	.362	38	George Allen / Jim Canavan

No playoffs held

Player statistics
Player	Team	Stat	Tot	Player	Team	Stat	Tot
Fred Crolius	New London	BA	.348	Carson Hodge	Holyoke	W	24
Ad Yale	Bridgeport	Runs	96	Carson Hodge	Holyoke	Pct	.727; 24–9
Fred Crolius	New London	Hits	160	Chick Hartley	Holyoke	HR	9

1906 Connecticut State League
President: Jim O'Rourke

Team standings	W	L	PCT	GB	Managers
Norwich Reds	72	53	.576	-	George Allen / Jack Tighe
Springfield Ponies	70	56	.556	2½	Daniel O'Neill
New Haven Blues	68	57	.544	4 0	William Slack
Hartford Senators	62	57	.521	7	Bert Daly / J.H. Clarkin
Waterbury Authors	60	53	.488	11	Harry Durant
Holyoke Paperweights	58	65	.472	13	Tom Fleming; Tommy Dowd / M. Prindiville
Bridgeport Orators	54	72	.429	18½	Jim O'Rourke
New London Whalers	53	74	.417	20	Charles Humphrey / Sam Kennedy

No 0layoffs held

Player statistics
Player	Team	Stat	Tot	Player	Team	Stat	Tot
Frank Burke	New Haven	BA	.349	Mickey Corcoran	New Haven	W	26
Ed Fitzpatrick	Springfi/New Haven	Runs	88	Mickey Corcoran	New Haven	Pct	.667; 26–13
Hi Ladd	Bridgeport	Hits	157	Otto Hess	Springfield	ShO	9
Pop Rising	New London	HR	5				

1907 Connecticut State League
President: W. J. Tracey

Team standings	W	L	PCT	GB	Managers
Holyoke Papermakers	83	42	.664	-	Tommy Dowd
Waterbury Authors	77	47	.621	5½	Harry Durant
Springfield Ponies	72	49	.595	9	Daniel O'Neill
Norwich Reds	71	51	.582	10½	August Soffel
Hartford Senators	66	55	.545	15	James Clarkin
Bridgeport Orators	48	75	.390	34	Jim O'Rourke
New Haven Blues	44	80	.355	38½	Cornelius Danaher
New London Whalers	31	93	.250	51½	Sam Kennedy / Charles Page

No playoffs held

Player statistics
Player	Team	Stat	Tot	Player	Team	Stat	Tot
Hi Ladd	Bridgeport	BA	.341	Ira Plank	New Haven	W	26
Mike McAndrews	Waterbury	Runs	100	Ed Farley	Waterbury	Pct	.774; 24–7
Hi Ladd	Bridgeport	Hits	168	Lou Lapine	Holyoke	HR	8

1908 Connecticut State League
President: W. J. Tracey

Team standings	W	L	PCT	GB	Managers
Springfield Ponies	84	41	.672	-	Daniel O'Neill
Hartford Senators	84	42	.667	½	Tommy Dowd / Thomas Connery
New Haven Blues	63	63	.500	21½	Bert Daly; Billy Lush / George Bone
New Britain Perfectos	61	64	.488	23 0	Charles Humphrey / William Hanna
Holyoke Papermakers	60	66	.476	24½	Jack Tighe / Fred Winkler
Bridgeport Orators	55	71	.437	29½	Jim O'Rourke
Meriden Silverites	54	72	.429	30½	Charles Cheney
Waterbury Authors	42	84	.333	42½	Harry Durant

No playoffs held

Player statistics
Player	Team	Stat	Tot	Player	Team	Stat	Tot
Swat McCabe	New Britain	BA	.320	Red Waller	Bridgeport	W	23
Hack Simmons	New Haven	Runs	78	Ray Fisher	Hartford	Pct	.923; 12–1
Hack Simmons	New Haven	Hits	155	Hack Simmons	New Haven	HR	10

1909 Connecticut State League
President: Jim O'Rourke

Team standings	W	L	PCT	GB	Managers
Hartford Senators	74	44	.627	-	Thomas Connery
Holyoke Papermakers	68	53	.562	7½	Mike McCormack
New Britain Perfectos	64	55	.533	10½	William Hanna
Waterbury Invincibles	64	61	.512	13½	Michael Doherty
Springfield Ponies	60	63	.488	16½	John Zeller
New Haven Black Crows	59	65	.476	18	Phil Corcoran
Northampton Meadowlarks	54	68	.443	22	Rdward Bowler / Gil Edwards
Bridgeport Orators	44	78	.361	32	Jim O'Rourke

No playoffs held.

Player statistics
Player	Team	Stat	Tot	Player	Team	Stat	Tot
Swat McCabe	New Britain	BA	.366	Ray Fisher	Hartford	W	24
Barry McCormick	Northhampton	Runs	95	Ray Fisher	Hartford	Pct	.828; 24–5
Swat McCabe	New Britain	Hits	176	Ray Fisher	Hartford	SO	243
Cy Perkins	Hartford	HR	23	Eddie Files	Holyoke	BB	146

1910 Connecticut State League - schedule
President: W.J. Tracy

Team standings	W	L	PCT	GB	Managers
Waterbury Finnegans	70	52	.574	-	Michael J. Finn
Bridgeport Orators	67	52	.563	1½	Gene McCann
New Britain Perfectos	69	55	.556	2	William Hanna
New Haven Prairie Hens	67	55	.549	3	Bill Carrick
Hartford Senators	64	58	.525	6	Tom Connery
Springfield Ponies	58	68	.460	14	John Zeller
Northampton Meadowlarks	50	73	.407	20½	Bill Luby
Holyoke Papermakers	46	78	.371	25	Pop Foster

No playoffs held

Player statistics
Player	Team	Stat	Tot	Player	Team	Stat	Tot
Pop Foster	Holyoke	BA	.342	Red Waller	Bridgeport	W	21
Bill Rodgers	Waterbury	Runs	79	Sandy Bannister	Waterbury	W	21
Hi Ladd	Bridgeport	Hits	158	Buck O'Brien	Hartford	SO	264
Pop Foster	Holyoke	HR	15	M.J. Parker	New Britain	ERA	1.81

1911 Connecticut State League
President: Jim O'Rourke

Team standings	W	L	PCT	GB	Managers
Springfield Ponies	71	45	.614	-	John Zeller
Bridgeport Orators	71	47	.602	1	Gene McCann / Robert Tracey
Hartford Senators	68	52	.568	5	Tom Connery
New Haven Murlins	56	61	.480	15½	Pop Foster / George Cameron
New Britain Perfectos	53	66	.444	19½	Daniel O'Neill
Waterbury Champs	45	75	.375	28	Carl Pace / Frank McPartlin
Northampton Meadowlarks	21	24	.467	NA	Bill Luby
Holyoke Papermakers	16	31	.340	NA	Wade Moore

Northampton and Holyoke disbanded June 26
No playoffs held

Player statistics
Player	Team	Stat	Tot	Player	Team	Stat	Tot
Pop Foster	New Haven	BA	.325	Eddie Dent	New haven	W	21
Wilford Genest	Springfield	Runs	95	Bugs Reisigl	New Haven	SO	199
Hi Ladd	Bridgeport	Hits	143	Curt Walker	Holyoke/Bridge	Pct	.750; 15–5
Pop Foster	New Haven	HR	7	Fred Eley	Bridgeport	HR	7

1912 Connecticut State League
President: Jim O'Rourke

Team standings	W	L	PCT	GB	Managers
New Haven Murlins	76	41	.650	-	Jerry O'Connell
Hartford Senators	67	51	.568	9½	Tom Connery
Bridgeport Orators	61	55	.526	14½	Gene McCann
Holyoke Papermakers	57	58	.496	18	Daniel O'Neill
Springfield Ponies	50	70	.417	27½	John Zeller
New Britain / Waterbury Spuds	39	75	.342	35½	Jack Hoey

New Britain (12–22) moved to Waterbury June 15.
No playoffs held

Player statistics
Player	Team	Stat	Tot	Player	Team	Stat	Tot
Hugh High	Hartford	BA	.327	Bugs Reisigl	New Haven	W	21
Hugh High	Hartford	Runs	80	Frank Green	Holyoke	SO	212
Hugh High	Hartford	Hits	145	Pop Foster	New Haven	Pct	.750; 15–5
Pop Foster	New Haven	HR	9	Cliff Averett	Hartford	Pct	.750; 12–4
