= Eastern Association (baseball) =

Baseball league

- Formerly: Connecticut League
- Classification: Class A (1891); Class D (1909); Class B (1913-1914)
- Sport: Minor League Baseball
- First season: 1891
- Folded: 1914
- President: Charles D. White (1891); Fred Paige (1909); Jim O'Rourke (1913-1914)
- No. of teams: 25
- Country: United States of America
- Last champion: Unknown
- Most titles: 1 Buffalo Bisons (1891); Newburgh Colts (1909); Hartford Senators (1913); New London Planters (1914)
- Related competitions: Eastern League

The Eastern Association was a minor league baseball league. The first version of the league appeared in 1882, followed by similar one season leagues in 1891 and 1909 with teams in Connecticut, New York, Pennsylvania and Rhode Island. The league was a Class B level league in the 1913 and 1914 seasons, with teams based in Connecticut and Massachusetts.

== History ==
The 1891 Eastern Association played as a Class A level league and the president was Charles D. White. the 1891 league members were the Albany Senators, Buffalo Bisons, Lebanon Cedars, New Haven Nutmegs, Providence Clamdiggers, Rochester Hop Bitters, Syracuse Stars and Troy Trojans.

In 1909, the Eastern Association played for eleven days before folding under league president Jim Paige. The 1909 league comprised Amsterdam, Gloversville, Johnstown, Kingston Colonials, Middletown Orange Blossoms, Newburgh Colts, Poughkeepsie Students and Schenectady.

The 1913 Eastern Association was an eight-team league that featured the Bridgeport Crossmen, Hartford Senators, Holyoke Papermakers, Meriden Hopes, New Haven White Wings, New London Planters, Pittsfield Electrics, Springfield Ponies and Waterbury Contenders. The league president was Baseball Hall of Fame member Jim O'Rourke. The Holyoke Papermakers moved to Meriden on July 11, 1913.

In their final season of play, the 1914 Eastern Association was an eight-team league, as Jim O'Rourke continued as president. The 1914 Eastern Association comprised the Bridgeport Crossmen, Hartford Senators, New Britain Sinks, New Haven White Wings, New London Planters, Pittsfield Electrics, Springfield Ponies and Waterbury Contenders.

== Cities represented ==
- Albany, New York: Albany Senators 1891
- Amsterdam, New York: Amsterdam 1909
- Bridgeport, Connecticut: Bridgeport Crossmen 1913; Bridgeport Bolts 1914
- Buffalo, New York: Buffalo Bisons 1891
- Gloversville, New York: Gloversville 1909
- Hartford, Connecticut: Hartford Senators 1913–1914
- Holyoke, Massachusetts: Holyoke Papermakers 1913
- Johnstown, New York: Johnstown 1909
- Kingston, New York: Kingston Colonials 1909
- Lebanon, Pennsylvania: Lebanon Cedars 1891
- Meriden, Connecticut: Meriden Hopes 1913
- Middletown, New York: Middletown Orange Blossoms 1909
- New Britain, Connecticut: New Britain Sinks 1914
- New Haven, Connecticut: New Haven Nutmegs 1891; New Haven White Wings 1913–1914
- New London, Connecticut: New London Planters 1913–1914
- Newburgh, New York: Newburgh Colts 1909
- Pittsfield, Massachusetts: Pittsfield Electrics 1913–1914
- Poughkeepsie, New York: Poughkeepsie Students 1909
- Providence, Rhode Island: Providence Clamdiggers 1891
- Rochester, New York: Rochester Hop Bitters 1891
- Schenectady, New York: Schenectady Electricians 1909
- Springfield, Massachusetts: Springfield Ponies 1913–1914
- Syracuse, New York: Syracuse Stars 1891
- Troy, New York: Troy Trojans 1891
- Waterbury, Connecticut: Waterbury Contenders 1913; Waterbury Frolickers 1914

== Standings & statistics ==
=== 1891 Eastern Association ===
schedule

Team	W	L	GB	Pct.	Manager
Buffalo Bisons	89	35	.718	–	Patrick Powers
Albany Senators	72	49	.595	15½	Joe Gerhardt
Troy Trojans	51	77	.398	36½	David Mahoney
Lebanon Cedars	48	73	.397	37	James Randall
Syracuse Stars	56	42	.571	NA	George Frazer
New Haven Nutmegs	48	39	.552	NA	Walt Burnham
Rochester Hop Bitters	36	60	.375	NA	Tom Power / Lew Kerstein
Providence Clamdiggers	29	54	.349	NA	Bill McGunnigle

Providence disbanded August 13; New Haven disbanded August 14; Syracuse & Rochester disbanded August 25.

Player statistics
Player	Team	Stat	Tot	Player	Team	Stat	Tot
Buck West	Syracuse	BA	.339	Les German	Buffalo	W	35
Ted Scheffler	Buffalo	Runs	156	Tony Von Fricken	Albany	SO	197
Harry Lyons	Buffalo	Hits	166	L.A. Gilliland	New Haven	ERA	0.89
Dan Lally	New Haven	HR	5	Les German	Buffalo	PCT	.761; 35–11
Pete Sweeney	Rochester	HR	5				
Art Bader	Albany	SB	106				

=== 1909 Eastern Association ===
Team	W	L	GB	Pct.	Manager
Newburgh Colts	8	2	.800	–	William Landgraf
Amsterdam	5	3	.625	2	NA
Johnstown	4	3	.571	2½	NA
Kingston Colonials	4	3	.571	2½	Hugh MacKinnon
Gloversville	4	5	.444	3½	Jacob Leist
Middletown Orange Blossoms	2	6	.250	5	William K. Murray
Poughkeepsie Students	NA	NA	NA	NA	Fred Paige
Schenectady Electricians	NA	NA	NA	NA	Joseph Andries

Poughkeepsie and Schenectady disbanded June 1
The league folded after eleven days on June 6.

=== 1913 Eastern Association ===
schedule

Team	W	L	GB	Pct.	Manager
Hartford Senators	83	48	.634	–	Simon McDonald
New Haven White Wings	79	52	.603	4	Jerry O'Connell
Waterbury Contenders	70	61	.534	13	Sam Kennedy
Bridgeport Crossmen	69	63	.523	14½	Gene McCann / John Freeman / Monte Cross
New London Planters	65	66	.496	18	John Burns / Gene McCann
Springfield Ponies	60	70	.462	22½	Frank Corridon / Jack O'Hara
Pittsfield Electrics	62	73	.459	23	John Zeller
Holyoke Papermakers / Meriden Hopes	40	95	.296	45	Jim Garry

Holyoke (24–52) moved to Meriden July 11.

Player statistics
Player	Team	Stat	Tot	Player	Team	Stat	Tot
Benny Kauff	Hartford	BA	.345	Bill Hopper	New Haven	W	31
Bill Morley	Hartford	Runs	103	Wib Smith	Pittsfield	SO	175
Benny Kauff	Hartford	Hits	176	Bill Hopper	New Haven	ERA	2.03
Tom Stankard	Holy/Mer/Sprin	HR	8	Bill Hopper	New Haven	PCT	.795 31–8

=== 1914 Eastern Association ===
schedule

Team	W	L	GB	Pct.	Manager
New London Planters	81	35	.698	–	Gene McCann
Waterbury Frolickers	69	51	.575	14	Lee Fohl
Bridgeport Bolts	67	56	.545	17½	Jake Boultes
Hartford Senators	62	56	.525	20	Simon McDonald / Daniel O'Neill
Springfield Ponies	63	61	.508	22	Billy Hamilton / Simon McDonald
Pittsfield Electrics	60	63	.488	24½	John Zeller
New Haven White Wings	54	64	.458	28	Jerry O'Connell
New Britain Sinks	27	97	.218	58	George Browne / Jim Garry

Player statistics
Player	Team	Stat	Tot	Player	Team	Stat	Tot
Elmer Smith	Waterbury	BA	.332	Willie Jensen	New Haven	W	21
Marty Becker	New London	Runs	90	Bun Troy	Pittsfield	SO	212
Ed Barney	Hartford	Hits	140	Doc Powers	New Haven	ERA	2.03
Pete Shields	Waterbury	HR	7	Doc Powers	New Haven	PCT	.769 20–6

== Sources ==
- Baseball Reference
