= Arlie Latham =

American baseball player (1860–1952)

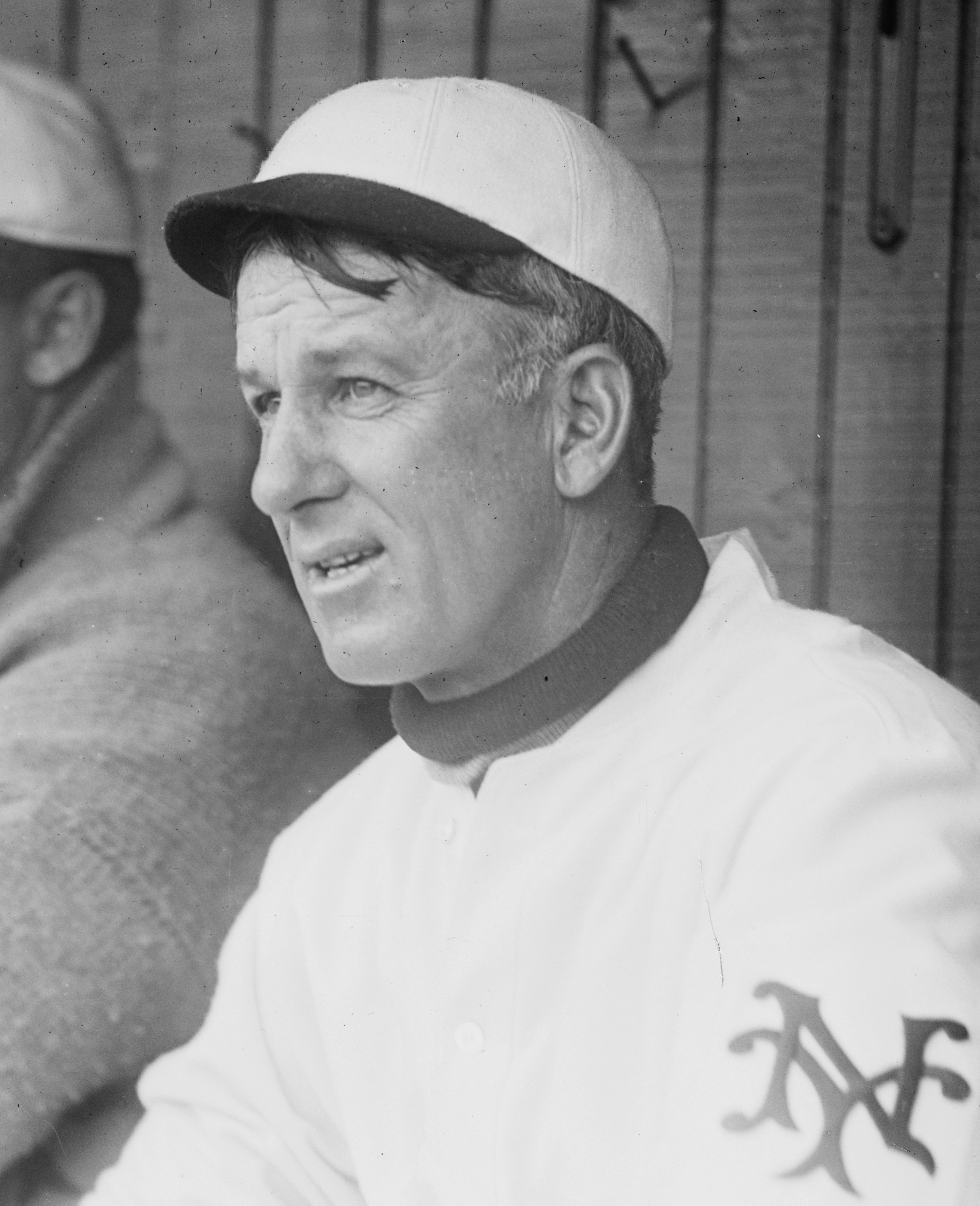
- Latham with the New York Giants in 1909
- Third baseman
- Born: March 15, 1860; West Lebanon, New Hampshire, U.S.
- Died: November 29, 1952 (aged 92); Garden City, New York, U.S.
- Batted: Right Threw: Right

MLB debut
- July 5, 1880, for the Buffalo Bisons

Last MLB appearance
- September 30, 1909, for the New York Giants

MLB statistics
- Batting average: .269
- Home runs: 27
- Runs batted in: 563
- Stolen bases: 742
- Stats at Baseball Reference

Teams
- As player: Buffalo Bisons (1880); St. Louis Browns (1883–1889); Chicago Pirates (1890); Cincinnati Reds (1890–1895); St. Louis Browns (1896); Washington Senators (1899); New York Giants (1909); As manager: St. Louis Browns (1896)

Career highlights and awards
- American Association stolen base leader (1888)

Walter Arlington Latham (March 15, 1860 – November 29, 1952) was an American third baseman in Major League Baseball. He played from 1880 through 1909 for the Buffalo Bisons, St. Louis Browns, Chicago Pirates, Cincinnati Reds, Washington Senators, and New York Giants. He also served as player-manager of the Browns in 1896.

Latham stole 129 bases during the 1887 season. His career total of 742 ranks seventh all-time in the majors. As a player-coach for the 1909 Giants, Latham, at age 49, became the oldest MLB player to steal a base.

After his retirement as a player, he became what is acknowledged as the first full-time base coach in baseball history. For years he served as a coach and manager in the minor leagues.

After retiring from baseball, Latham traveled to Great Britain, where he organized baseball matches for soldiers during World War I and taught baseball to the British. He later worked in baseball as a press box attendant.

== Early life ==
Latham's father was a bugler in the Union Army during the American Civil War. Latham became interested in baseball when soldiers returning from the battlefield brought the game of baseball with them. At the age of fourteen, he played with a local team from Stoneham, Massachusetts, as their catcher, fielding barehanded. In 1877, he played for a team in Pittsfield, Massachusetts, as a third baseman.

== Playing career ==
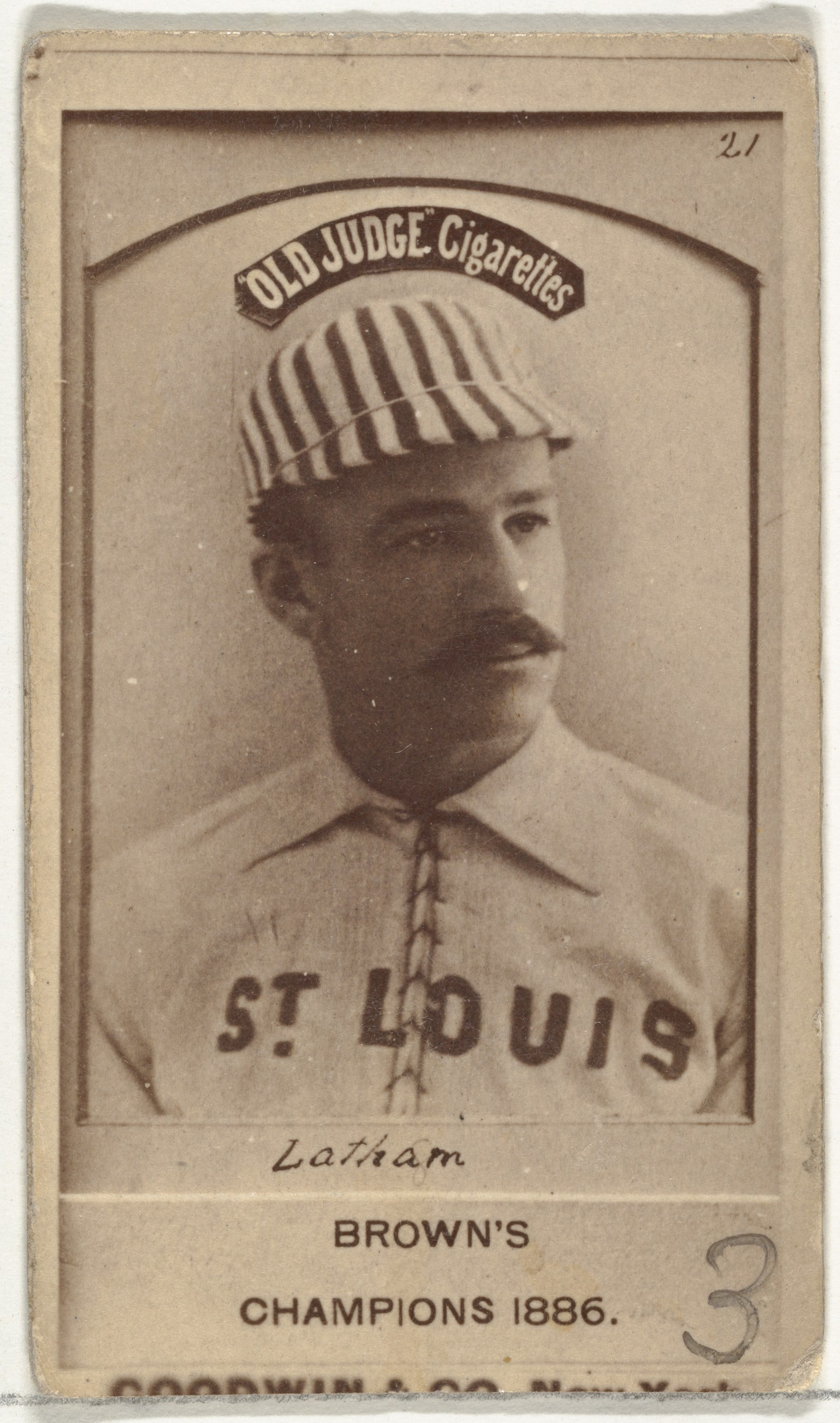
Latham baseball card from 1886

Latham made his professional baseball debut with Springfield of the National Association in 1879. Latham made his major-league debut with the Buffalo Bisons of the National League (NL) in 1880; he is considered the first man from New Hampshire to play in MLB. He played for the Philadelphia Athletics of the Eastern Championship Association in 1881, and the Philadelphia Phillies of the League Alliance in 1882.

Latham returned to the major leagues with the St. Louis Browns of the American Association (AA) in 1883. Latham was known as an excellent base stealer in his day. He led the AA in runs scored (152) during the 1886 season, batted .316, and stole 142 bases, plus another 12 stolen bases in the playoffs. In 1887, as a member of the Browns, he stole 129 bases. This record is not recognized by Major League Baseball, as stolen bases were defined differently prior to 1898. He led the league in stolen bases with 109 during the 1888 season.

In 1890, he jumped to the Chicago Pirates of the Players' League. He returned to the NL with the Cincinnati Reds in July 1890 to serve as a utility player and coach. He played for Cincinnati through 1895, and was traded to the Browns after the 1895 season with Ed McFarland, Morgan Murphy, Tom Parrott and cash for Red Ehret and Heinie Peitz. The Browns released Latham after the 1896 season.

Latham then returned to the minor leagues. He played for the Columbus Buckeyes/Senators of the Western League and Scranton Miners of the Eastern League in 1896. He played for the Mansfield Haymakers of the Interstate League in 1897. In 1898, he applied to become a NL umpire; instead, he played for the New Britain Rangers of the Connecticut State League and Hartford Cooperatives of the Atlantic League in 1898. Latham returned to the major leagues with the Washington Senators in 1899. He played for the Denver Grizzlies of the Western League in 1902.

He made a handful of cameo appearances as a player for the New York Giants of the NL in 1909, becoming the oldest man in Major League history to steal a base, at the age of 49, a record that still stands today. Latham ended his career with 742 stolen bases. Latham's baserunning expertise was apparently purely instinctive.

He holds the career record for errors at third base, with 822, more than 200 more than the next player on the list. Latham's arm had been injured in a throwing contest with a teammate, which led to Latham making weak or half-hearted attempts to field ground balls.

== Return to minor league baseball ==
Latham became an umpire in 1903 in the International League. In 1906, Latham managed the Jacksonville Jays of the Southern League. He also served as an umpire for the league and the South Atlantic League.

== Coaching career ==
Latham was Major League Baseball's first full-time coach. During his playing days, he would stand on the third base line and yell insults at the other team's pitcher, attempting to distract him and give the Browns an advantage. One of his techniques was to scream while running up and down the third base line during the pitcher's delivery. The coach's box was introduced to prevent him from doing this.

While Cy Seymour coached third base for the Giants during a game against the Philadelphia Phillies, Seymour tackled Moose McCormick as he rounded third base and headed for home plate. When Giants manager John McGraw asked why, Seymour made an excuse about having the sun in his eyes. This led McGraw, realizing the need for a full-time coach, to hire Latham for the role, the first full-time coach in MLB. Latham tried to do the same things in New York as he had done years earlier in St. Louis, but times had changed and screaming obscenities was not looked well upon, as baseball was being changed into more of a family-friendly game by then. In the opinion of Giants player Fred Snodgrass, however, he was "probably the worst third base coach that ever lived". After the 1910 season, Latham was let go by the Giants.

In 1914, Latham coached with the Lynn Fighters of the New England League; in July 1914, he resigned from the team. Latham announced his retirement from professional baseball in 1915. He wrote for The Pittsburgh Press in 1915. Latham lived in England during World War I, where he organized baseball for the soldiers, and taught King George V about baseball. He returned to the United States in 1923, and opened a delicatessen on Saint Nicholas Avenue in Manhattan. He also served as a press box attendant for the Giants at the Polo Grounds and New York Yankees at Yankee Stadium.

== Personality ==
Known for his on-field antics, Latham was considered one of the funniest personalities in baseball. Nicknamed "The Freshest Man on Earth", Latham was a colorful player known for playing practical jokes, including on Browns owner Chris von der Ahe and manager Charles Comiskey. In one famous stunt, he lit a firecracker under third base in an effort to "wake himself up", after Comiskey had been complaining about him falling asleep on the job. Also he would occasionally put on a clown's nose while walking behind von der Ahe.

A practical joke Latham pulled on Cy Seymour in March 1909 caused a fight between the two at the team's hotel, prompting McGraw to discharge Seymour from the team and seek a buyer.

== See also ==
- List of Major League Baseball career runs scored leaders
- List of Major League Baseball career stolen bases leaders
- List of Major League Baseball annual runs scored leaders
- List of Major League Baseball player-managers
- List of St. Louis Cardinals team records
- List of Major League Baseball single-game hits leaders
