= Pat Duff =

American baseball player (1875-1925)

- Pinch hitter
- Born: May 6, 1875; Providence, Rhode Island, U.S.
- Died: September 11, 1925 (aged 50); Providence, Rhode Island, U.S.
- Batted: Right Threw: Unknown

MLB debut
- April 16, 1906, for the Washington Senators

Last MLB appearance
- April 16, 1906, for the Washington Senators

MLB statistics
- At bats: 1
- Hits: 0
- Stats at Baseball Reference

Teams
- Washington Senators (1906)

Patrick Henry Duff (May 6, 1875 – September 11, 1925) was an American professional baseball player. Duff played one game in Major League Baseball, and in one at bat he didn't compile a hit. Despite his limited playing time in the majors, Duff's minor league career spanned eight nonconsecutive seasons.

== Early life ==
Duff was born in Providence, Rhode Island, on May 6, 1875, though 1890 United States census records suggests he was born in 1876. His father, Patrick Duff, was born in Ireland in 1830, and worked as a laborer. Duff's mother was also from Ireland. Duff attended Manhattan College from 1901 to 1904.

== Professional career ==
In 1897, Duff began his professional career with the Class-B Fall River Indians of the New England League. With the Indians, Duff got no hits in 3 at-bats. Duff played with the Class-F New Haven Blues, and the Class-F Norwich Witches of the Connecticut State League in 1901 after a three-year absence in professional baseball. He batted .260 with 82 hits, 14 doubles, 6 triples, 7 home runs, and 20 stolen bases that season. On the season, Duff was tied for sixth in the league in home runs along with Thomas Ivers, and Bob Unglaub. The next season, Duff again played for the New Haven Blues, and the Norwich Witches, however, his stats for that season were not kept. Duff also played for the Class-A Syracuse Stars of the Eastern League in 1901, but did not play. In 1904, Duff played for the All-Americans of the Cuban League playing first base on a team that included multiple major leaguers.

After another three-year absence from pro-baseball, Duff played for the Class-AA Minneapolis Millers, and the Class-AA Indianapolis Indians of the American Association in 1905. In 22 games that season, Duff batted .176 with 13 hits, and 3 doubles. In 1906, Duff played his only season in Major League Baseball with the Washington Senators. In only 1 games, Duff did not get a hit in 1 at-bat. The next season, Duff played for the Class-B York White Roses/Reading Pretzels, and the Class-B Johnstown Johnnies of the Tri-State League. In 100 games that season, Duff batted .204 with 68 hits, and 11 doubles, 3 triples, and 1 home run. In 1908, Duff played for the Class-B New Bedford Whalers, and the Lowell Tigers of the New England League. He batted .243 with 99 hits, 13 doubles, 1 triple, and 1 home run in 117 games. Duff played the 1909 season with the Class-B Haverhill Hustlers, and the Class-B Brockton Tigers of the New England League. In 78 games, Duff batted .226 with 60 hits, 8 doubles, 3 triples, and 1 home run. Duff's final season in professional baseball came in 1910 when he was at the age of 35. In 13 games with the Class-D Norwich Bonbons/Meriden Doublins of the Connecticut Association, Duff batted .357 with 15 hits.

== Later life ==
Duff died in Providence, Rhode Island, on September 11, 1925, at the age of 50. He was buried St. Ann Cemetery in Cranston, Rhode Island.
