= Reddy Foster =

American baseball player (1864–1908)

- Catcher
- Born: August 1864; Richmond, Virginia, U.S.
- Died: December 19, 1908 (aged 44); Richmond, Virginia, U.S.
- Batted: Unknown Threw: Unknown

MLB debut
- June 3, 1896, for the New York Giants

Last MLB appearance
- June 3, 1896, for the New York Giants

MLB statistics
- Batting average: .000
- Hits: 0
- Stolen bases: 0
- Stats at Baseball Reference

Teams
- New York Giants (1896)

Oscar E. "Reddy" Foster (August 1864 – December 19, 1908) was an American Major League Baseball (MLB) player for the New York Giants in 1896. His only MLB appearance was on June 3 of that season. He primarily played catcher in his minor league career, which spanned 17 seasons. Foster was a manager as well. He was known for his fiery temper and his heavy drinking. Foster died on December 19, 1908, when he deliberately shot himself in the head with a shotgun.

== Early minor league career ==
Oscar E. Foster, nicknamed Reddy, was born sometime in August 1864 in Richmond, Virginia. In 1890, he played 27 games as an outfielder for the Lebanon, Pennsylvania, entry in the Eastern Interstate League. In 27 games, he batted .202 with 12 runs scored, 21 hits, 1 double, 3 triples, 2 home runs, and 9 stolen bases.

In 1894, Foster joined the Richmond Crows of the newly-formed Virginia League, excelling at the catcher position according to baseball historian Frank Russo. No statistics are recorded from his 1894 season. In 1895, he played 102 games, batting .276 with 93 runs scored, 110 hits, 26 doubles, 4 triples, 6 home runs, and 41 stolen bases. He split 1896 between multiple teams. In 51 games for Richmond, he batted .279 with 51 runs scored, 55 hits, 11 doubles, 3 triples, 2 home runs, and 46 stolen bases. Foster also played 59 games for the New York Metropolitans of the Atlantic League, batting .281 with 55 runs scored, 63 hits, 15 doubles, 5 triples, 1 home run, and 40 stolen bases. That gave him a total of 86 stolen bases in the minor leagues in 1896.

== New York Giants ==
During the 1896 season, Foster also played in his only Major League Baseball (MLB) game. It was for the New York Giants on June 3, when they were playing the Chicago Colts at the Polo Grounds. Foster was hitless in his only at bat of the game as Chicago defeated New York by a score of 14–8.

== Later minor league career ==
For 1897, Foster returned to Richmond, this time with the Richmond Giants of the Atlantic League. In 106 games, he batted .256 with 53 runs scored, 91 hits, 16 doubles, 6 triples, 3 home runs, and 35 stolen bases. He played for the league's Allentown Peanuts in 1898, though statistics from this year are unavailable.

In 1899, Foster played for three Connecticut League teams. With the Bristol Bell Makers, he batted .304 with 56 runs scored, 94 hits, 19 doubles, 4 triples, 2 home runs, and 21 stolen bases. He also played for the Waterbury Rough Riders and the New London Whalers, though his statistics from these teams are not recorded. With these teams, Foster played mainly as a catcher, but he also served as an outfielder, second baseman, and third baseman.

The Richmond Blue Birds and the Hampton Crabs both employed Foster during the 1900 campaign. With Richmond, he batted .191 with 16 runs scored, 25 hits, 4 doubles, 0 triples, 0 home runs, and 9 stolen bases in 33 games. He only played 14 games for Hampton, batting .271 with 3 runs scored, 13 hits, 3 doubles, 0 triples, 0 home runs, and 3 stolen bases. Most of these appearances were at the catcher position, though Foster was also used as an outfielder and first baseman with Richmond. He played for the Tarboro Tartars of the North Carolina League in 1901. On July 29, his manager, Henry Bryan, got the police to arrest Barley Kain, manager of a team located in Darlington, South Carolina, for trying to get Foster to play for his team. Foster's statistics with Tarboro and the Davenport River Rats of the Illinois-Indiana-Iowa League, for whom he played in 1902, are unavailable.

Foster managed several of his teams, most notably one located in Bluefield, West Virginia. In 1906, he returned as a player with the Norfolk Tars of the Virginia League. Then, he moved to the Portsmouth Truckers of the same league that year, serving as their player-manager and catcher. His time with Portsmouth ended after his first baseman dropped a pickoff throw that would have retired the baserunner by several feet. Enraged at his fielder's incompetence, Foster took off his catcher's gear and left the baseball field, never to play again. Statistics from his 1906 season are unavailable.

== Temper and alcohol issues ==
Russo states that Foster "was known as a hard-drinking, rough, and ready ballplayer whose temper usually got the best of him." When his teams lost, he would scream and shout at his wife, Mary, while making ominous gestures. Though it was never confirmed, contemporaries suspected that he sometimes beat her. Mary eventually instructed friends to warn her of the outcome of the game. If the team lost, she would go to a neighbor's home and wait for her husband to get sober.

== Death ==
Foster's alcoholism became more severe after he retired. He engaged in a drinking binge on December 18 and 19, 1908, making suicidal comments to those with him. On December 19, he and friend Lee Polkington wandered down to banks of the James River. Foster carried with him a whiskey bottle and a 12-gauge shotgun, double-barreled and loaded. After taking a drink of whiskey, he said to Polkington, "Watch me do a trick." Putting the shotgun under his chin, he set off the trigger with his foot, dying instantly at the age of 44. Baseball associates of his in the Richmond area were shocked to hear of his suicide. Despite his alcohol issues, he had a great deal of fans and friends.

Foster was survived by Mary and their three children: John, Katie, and Julia. He had another son from a previous marriage, Joseph, who survived him as well. Foster was buried at Richmond's Oakwood Cemetery.
