= Wethersfield Avenue Baseball Grounds =

Baseball park in Hartford, Connecticut

- Clarkin's Field
- Wethersfield Avenue Grounds in 1912

- Location within Connecticut Location within the United States
- Interactive map of Wethersfield Avenue Baseball Grounds
- Former names: Clarkin Field (I)
- Address: 831 Wethersfield Avenue; Hartford, Connecticut
- Coordinates: 41.7331931°N 72.6701500°W
- Capacity: unknown
- Field size: unknown

Construction
- Groundbreaking: about 1895
- Opened: about 1896
- Demolished: about 1920

Tenant
- Hartford Senators 1896-1920

Wethersfield Avenue Baseball Grounds, also referred to as Clarkin Field or Clarkin's Field (I) was a baseball park located in Hartford, Connecticut. The facility was home to the following minor league teams:

- Hartford Atlantic League Bluebirds 1896-1897 / Co-operatives 1898
- Hartford Eastern League Indians 1899-1900 / Wooden Nutmegs 1901
- Hartford Senators Connecticut League 1902, 1904-1912 / Valley League 1903 / Eastern Association 1913-1914
- Hartford Senators Eastern League 1916-1918; 1919-1920

For the 1896 season, the Atlantic League team's owners constructed stands for the field. The ballpark was situated between Plymouth Street and Eaton Street at 831 Wethersfield Avenue.

The first Atlantic League game in Hartford was played on April 23, 1896, with Hartford defeating New Haven 16-11.

In 1905, James H. Clarkin assumed the position as the Hartford Club's owner. In local newspapers, "Clarkin's Field" became the secondary name for the Wethersfield Avenue Grounds.

In 1912, Clarkin renewed his lease for ten years, and built a new grandstand.

The final Eastern League game in Hartford was a doubleheader on September 11, 1920. Hartford won both games from Waterbury.

A new Clarkin Field (II) was built in 1921, a block to the west, to replace the aging Wethersfield Avenue Grounds. The last listing of the old ballpark in Hartford city directories is in the 1921 edition. The site is now occupied by residences and commercial businesses.

== Sources ==
- Peter Filichia, Professional Baseball Franchises, Facts on File, 1993.
- Phil Lowry, Green Cathedrals, several editions.
