= Ansonia Cuban Giants =

Information
- Affiliations: Cuban Giants
- League: Connecticut State League
- Location: Ansonia, Connecticut

The Ansonia Cuban Giants, also known as the Ansonia Big Gorhams, were an all black team in the otherwise segregated Connecticut State League.

== Players ==
Name	Year	Position	Ref.
Frank Bell	1891	Outfielder	
Ben Boyd	1891	Outfielder	
Cam	1891	Outfielder	
George Douglas	1891	Outfielder/Pitcher	
Jack Frye	1891	1st baseman	
Frank Grant	1891	2nd baseman	
Bob Jackson	1891	Catcher/Outfielder	
William Jackson	1891	Outfielder	
John Nelson	1891	Pitcher/Outfielder	
George Stovey	1891	Pitcher	
George Terrill	1891	Utility player	
Sol White	1891	2nd/3rd baseman	
Clarence Williams	1891	Catcher	
Ed Woods	1891	Pitcher	

== Bibliography ==
- Kleinknecht, Merl F. (1977). "Blacks in 19th Century Organized Baseball". The Baseball Research Journal. 6. Society for American Baseball Research: 118–126.
- Riley, James (1994). The Biographical Encyclopedia of the Negro Baseball Leagues. Carroll & Graf Publishers. ISBN 978-0-7867-0065-3.
- Thornton, Steve (2 November 2018). "African American Greats in Connecticut Baseball". Connecticut Explored.
- Thornton, Steve (6 April 2019). "Swinging for the Fences: Connecticut's Black Baseball Greats". Connecticut History.
