= Stankard =

Stankard is a surname. In Ireland the surname was found almost exclusively in Co. Galway in the 1901 census.

Notable people with the surname include:

- Paul Joseph Stankard (born 1943), American glass artist
- Tom Stankard (1882–1958), American football and baseball player
