= Ed Walsh =

American baseball player and manager (1881–1959)

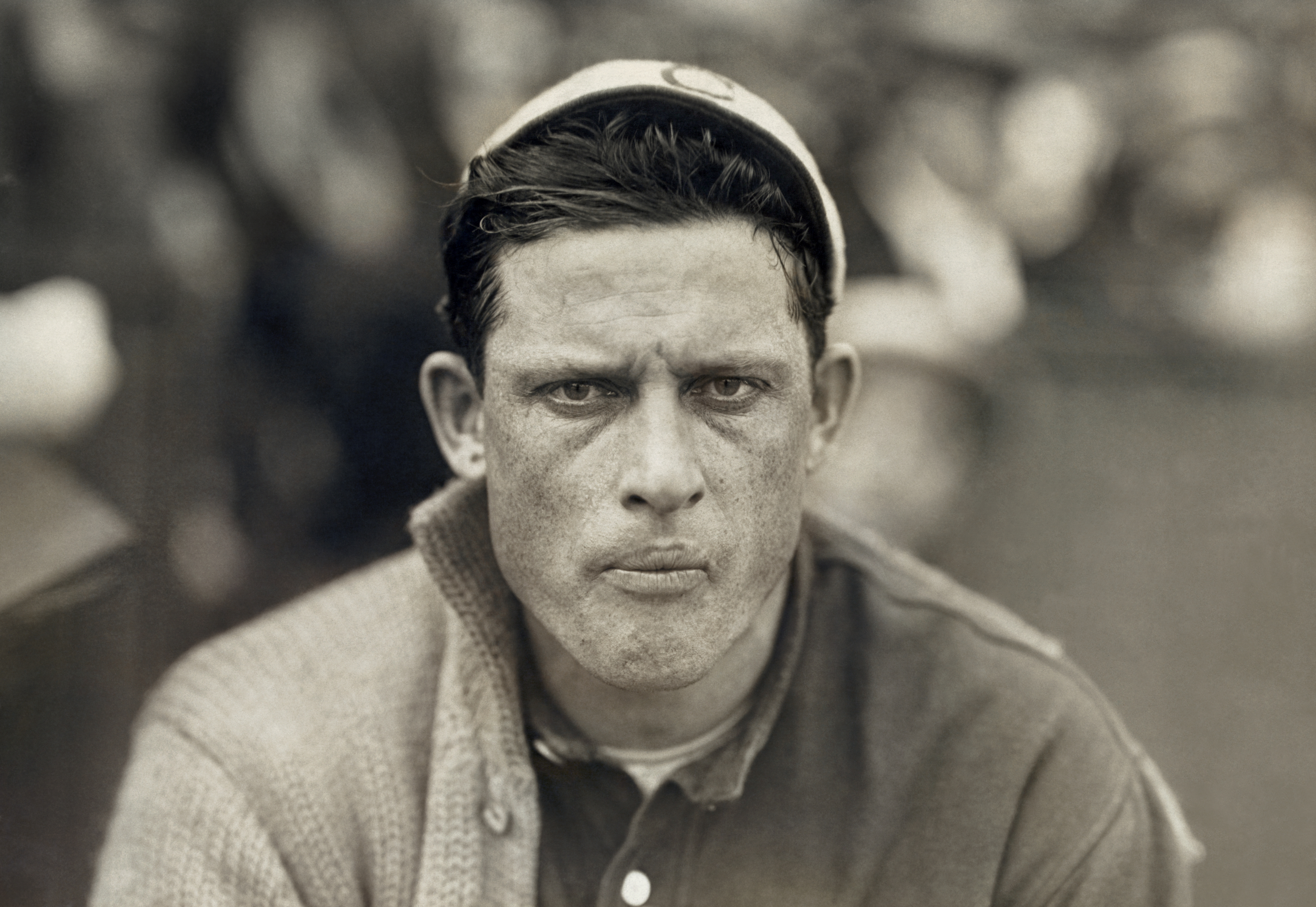
- Walsh with the Chicago White Sox in 1911
- Pitcher / Manager
- Born: May 14, 1881; Plains Township, Pennsylvania, U.S.
- Died: May 26, 1959 (aged 78); Pompano Beach, Florida, U.S.
- Batted: Right Threw: Right

MLB debut
- May 7, 1904, for the Chicago White Sox

Last MLB appearance
- September 11, 1917, for the Boston Braves

MLB statistics
- Win–loss record: 195–126
- Earned run average: 1.82
- Strikeouts: 1,736
- Stats at Baseball Reference
- Managerial record at Baseball Reference

Teams
- As player: Chicago White Sox (1904–1916); Boston Braves (1917); As manager: Chicago White Sox (1924)

Career highlights and awards
- World Series champion (1906); AL wins leader (1908); 2× AL ERA leader (1907, 1910); 2× AL strikeout leader (1908, 1911); MLB record 1.82 career ERA; Pitched a no-hitter on August 27, 1911

Member of the National

Baseball Hall of Fame
- Induction: 1946
- Election method: Old-Timers Committee

Edward Augustine Walsh (May 14, 1881 – May 26, 1959) was an American pitcher and manager in Major League Baseball, nicknamed "Big Ed". From 1906 to 1912 he was one of the best pitchers in baseball. Walsh holds the record for lowest career earned run average, 1.82. He is one of two modern (post-1901) pitchers to win 40 or more games in a single season, and the last pitcher to do so. He is the last pitcher from any team to throw more than 400 innings in a single season, a feat he accomplished in 1907 and 1908. Though injuries shortened his career, he was inducted into the Baseball Hall of Fame in 1946.

== Early life ==
Walsh was born in Plains Township, Pennsylvania, to Michael and Jane Walsh. He worked in the Luzerne County coal mines when he was young. Walsh started his professional baseball career with the 1902 Meriden Silverites of the Connecticut State League. After playing the 1903 season with the Meriden Silverites and Newark Sailors of the Eastern League, the Chicago White Sox purchased Walsh's contract for $750 ($26,875 in today's dollars).

== MLB career ==
=== Peak years ===
Walsh made his major league debut in 1904 with the Chicago White Sox and pitched his first full season in 1906, going 17–13 with a 1.88 ERA and 171 strikeouts. In Game Three of that year's World Series, which the White Sox won over the Chicago Cubs in six games, Walsh struck out a then-World Series record 12 batters. He also struck out at least one batter each inning of that game; this feat has since been duplicated twice, once by Bob Gibson in the 1968 World Series opener and the other time by Trey Yesavage in Game 5 of the 2025 World Series. From this season through 1912, Walsh averaged 24 victories and 220 strikeouts and posted an ERA below 2.00 five times. He also led the league in saves five times in this span. His finest individual season came in 1908 when he went 40–15 with 269 strikeouts, 6 saves and a 1.42 ERA, leading the American League in wins and strikeouts. In 1910, he posted the lowest ERA (1.27) for a pitcher with at least 20 starts and a losing record. Walsh also set an American League record by pitching 464 innings in a season. On August 27, 1911, Walsh no-hit the Boston Red Sox 5–0.

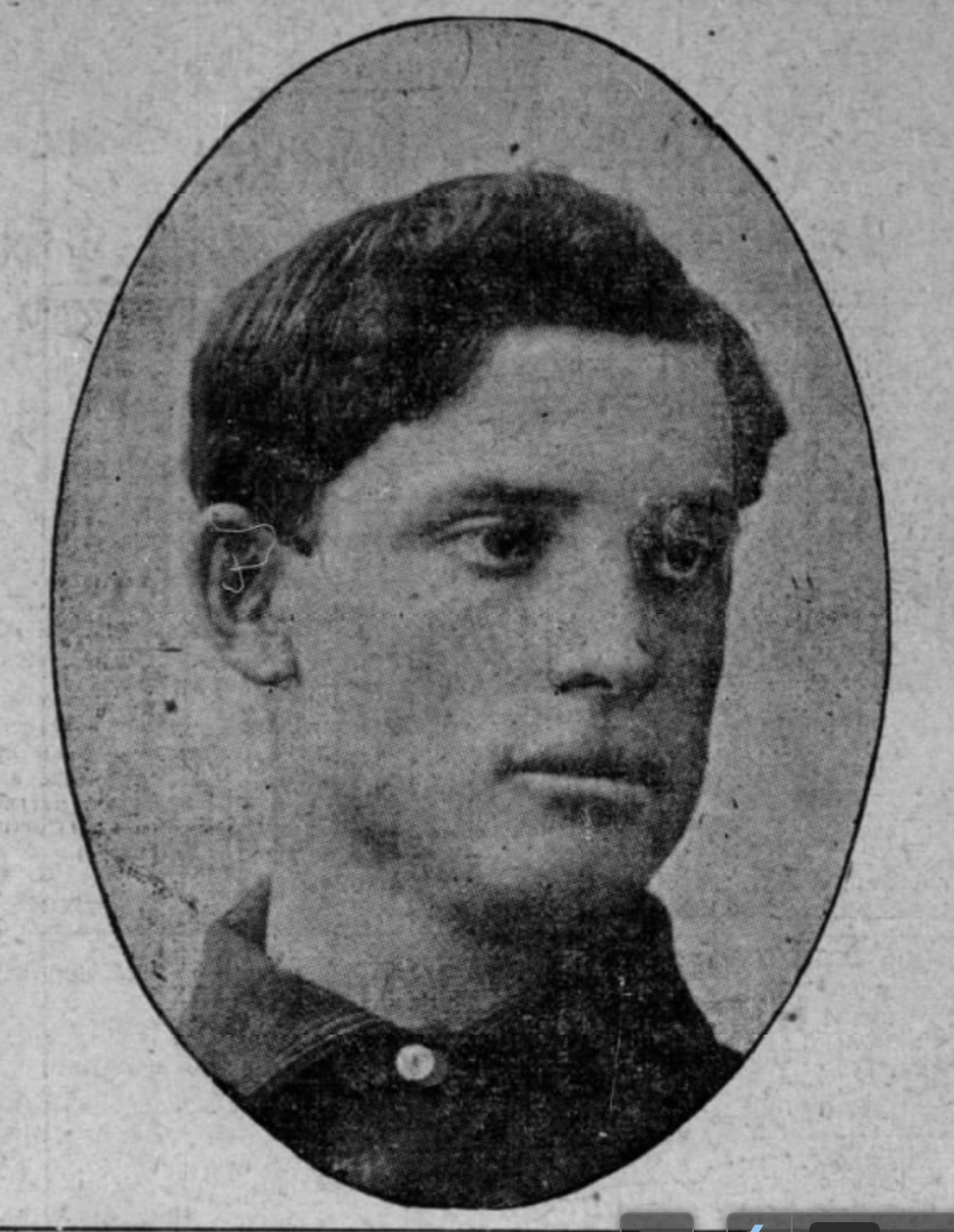
Ed Walsh portrait

Interviewed for the 1966 book The Glory of Their Times, Hall of Famer Sam Crawford referred to Walsh's use of a pitch that was later outlawed: "Big Ed Walsh. Great big, strong, good-looking fellow. He threw a spitball. I think that ball disintegrated on the way to the plate, and the catcher put it back together again. I swear, when it went past the plate, it was just the spit went by".

In 1910, the White Sox opened White Sox Park, which was soon nicknamed Comiskey Park by the press in honor of team owner Charles Comiskey. The name was officially changed to Comiskey Park in 1913. An apocryphal story goes that architect Zachary Taylor Davis consulted Walsh in setting the park's field dimensions. Choosing a design that favored himself and other White Sox pitchers, rather than hitters, Walsh made Comiskey Park a "pitcher's park" for its entire 80-year history.

=== Later career ===
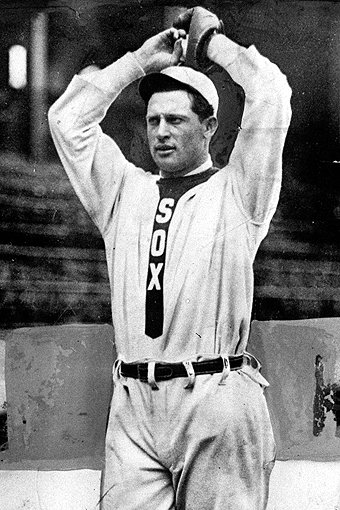
Walsh pitching for the White Sox c. 1911

Walsh was a workhorse who pitched an average of 375 innings annually during the six seasons of 1907 through 1912. After the 1912 season, Walsh reportedly requested a full year off to rest his arm. Nevertheless, he showed up for spring training the following season, contending, "The White Sox needed me—implored me to return—so I did". Walsh inherited 24 runners in 1912 and allowed none of them to score, setting a Major League record that stands as of 2023.

Walsh's playing time began dwindling in 1913. It has been claimed that he came into spring training in poorer physical shape than other members of the White Sox pitching staff, and his pride led him to try to keep up with the other pitchers in terms of pitch speed before getting into adequate shape, thereby causing damage to his pitching arm. "I could feel the muscles grind and wrench during the game, and it seemed to me my arm would leap out of my socket when I shot the ball across the plate", Walsh later recalled. "My arm would keep me awake till morning with a pain I had never known before". He pitched only 16 games during the 1913 season, and a meager 13 games over the next three years.

By 1916, Walsh's arm was dead. He wanted a year off, but Charles Comiskey released him instead. He attempted a comeback with the Boston Braves in 1917, but was let go, ending his major league career. He later did some pitching in the Eastern League, and gave umpiring a try (he umpired 87 American League games during the 1922 season), after which he was a coach for the White Sox for several seasons (1923–1924, 1928–1929).

Walsh retired with 195 wins, 126 losses, and 1736 strikeouts. His career ERA of 1.82 is the lowest major league ERA ever posted. He has the third-lowest career WHIP in MLB history (1.00) and the lowest ever for someone with 10 or more seasons pitched.

As a hitter, Walsh posted a .194 batting average (210-for-1,085) with 92 runs, 3 home runs, 68 RBI, 14 stolen bases and 46 bases on balls.

== Managerial record ==
Team	Year	Regular season					Postseason			
Team	Year	Games	Won	Lost	Win %	Finish	Won	Lost	Win %	Result
CWS	1924	3	1	2	.333	interim (Note: One of three managers (over four different stints) for the White Sox in 1924; Johnny Evers was manager for the first 21 games with a record of 10–11 (.476), Walsh was manager for the next three games, Eddie Collins was manager for the next 27 games, going 14–13 (.519), and Evers once again served as the manager for the final 102 games, going 41–61 (.402). The White Sox final record for the 1924 season was 66–87–1 (.431).)	–	–	–	–
Total		3	1	2	.333		0	0	–	

== Later life and legacy ==
Walsh was inducted into the Baseball Hall of Fame in 1946. He died on May 26, 1959, 12 days after his 78th birthday.

In 1999, Walsh was ranked number 82 on The Sporting News' list of the 100 Greatest Baseball Players, and was nominated as a finalist for the Major League Baseball All-Century Team. In 2011, he was inducted into the Irish American Baseball Hall of Fame.

Walsh's son Ed Walsh Jr. played for the White Sox from 1928 to 1932.

The no-hitter game that Walsh threw on August 27, 1911 was dramatized in the novel “A World I Never Made” (1936) by James T. Farrell.

== See also ==
- List of Major League Baseball no-hitters
- List of Major League Baseball annual ERA leaders
- List of Major League Baseball annual saves leaders
- List of Major League Baseball annual strikeout leaders
- List of Major League Baseball annual wins leaders
- Major League Baseball titles leaders

== Notes ==
Preceded by Smoky Joe Wood	No-hitter pitcher August 27, 1911	Succeeded by George Mullin
