= Northampton Meadowlarks =

Minor league baseball team

The Northampton Meadowlarks were a minor league baseball team based in Northampton, Massachusetts, which played in the, now defunct, Connecticut League. The team made its debut in 1909, when a local theatre owner and a former area athlete purchased the Meridan club, which had entered the league in 1908, for $2000 and moved the operation to Northampton. The team played its home games in newly renovated Driving Park, which was built inside the horse track on the Three County Fairgrounds. The Meadowlarks finished seventh that first season.

In 1910, first baseman Bill Luby replaced Goldie Bowler as manager, but the Meadowlarks' record failed to improve, and the Larks finished seventh again. In June 1911, with Luby still at the helm, the Connecticut League ejected the Northampton and Holyoke clubs for "failure to pay their debts." Northampton players went home unpaid or were recruited onto other teams. A few of the 1909–1911 Larks went on to play in the major leagues, most notably Jimmy Walsh (Philadelphia Athletics).

== Twin States League ==
A new Northampton Meadowlarks team solicited monies, including $2000 from President Calvin Coolidge, who was former mayor of Northampton, presumably at the behest of his wife Grace, "The First Lady of Baseball". The team was allowed to join the Twin States League the following season, with many of the players returning along with manager Luby. The Twin State League did not sign the "National Agreement" that placed the minor leagues under major league control, so the league was not considered "official", yet many major league clubs sent injured or slumping players to Twin State League teams and recalled them at will. Bill Luby, manager from the Connecticut League era, easily led the Meadowlarks to the Twin State pennant in 1912. In 1913 shortstop Jimmy Burns took over as a player-manager, and the Meadowlarks repeated as champions, edging out Greenfield at the season's end.

A racially charged incident took place on August 28, 1913. The Bellows Falls team hired Frank Wickware, a great African-American pitcher of the day, to face Northampton. Manager Burns refused to let the Meadowlarks take the field against Wickware, citing the "color line" in the major leagues, a move which provoked much criticism regionally, and some uneasiness among many in the city as well. In 1914, the Larks fell to last place. During the winter of 1914-15 the directors of the Twin State League, acting upon the complaints of Bellows Falls, issued an ultimatum to Northampton to pay a $1000 guarantee. Northampton dropped out. Greenfield, faced with the same ultimatum, followed suit, and the Twin State League suspended all operations.
