= Jack Frye (baseball) =

American baseball player (1864–1904)

- First baseman
- Born: May 1864; Harrisburg, Pennsylvania, U.S.
- Died: June 10, 1904 (aged 40); Brandy Station, Virginia, U.S.
- Batted: Unknown Threw: Unknown

debut
- 1890, for the Cuban Giants

Last appearance
- 1896, for the Cuban Giants
- Stats at Baseball Reference

Teams
- York Inter-state Base Ball Club (1890); Cuban Giants (1896)

John H. Frye (May 1864 - June 10, 1904) was an American professional baseball first baseman in the Negro leagues. Most of his uncovered records show he played for the Cuban Giants before 1900.

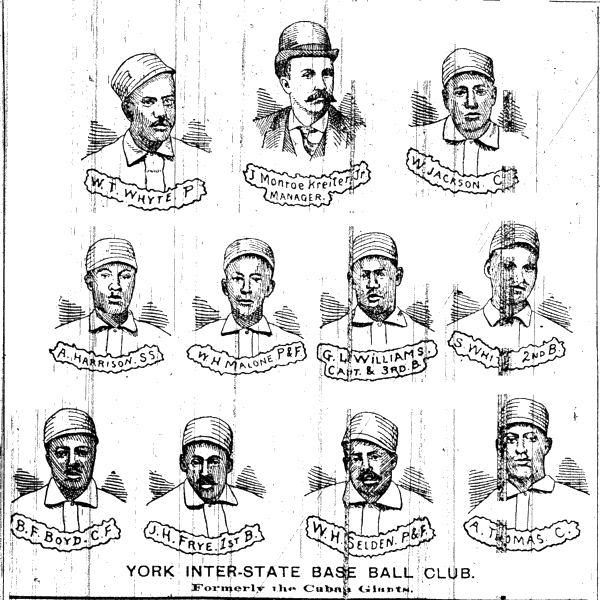
1890 Cuban Giants

There he played with many of the top-tier players of his day, including Sol White, John Patterson, Frank Grant, William Jackson, and Robert Jordan.
