= Bill Hopper (baseball) =

American baseball player (1891–1965)

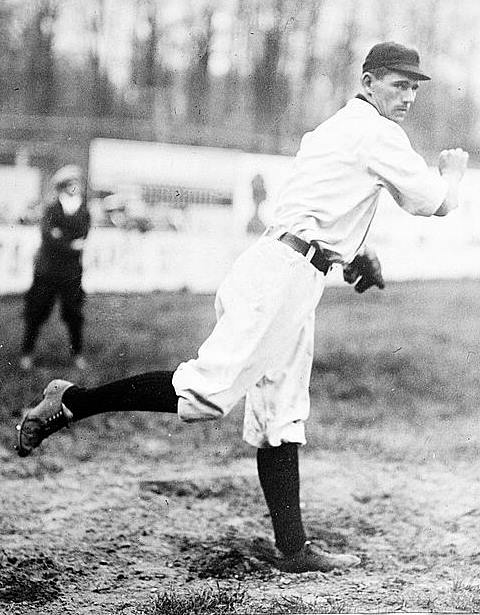
- Pitcher
- Born: August 26, 1891; Jackson, Tennessee, U.S.
- Died: January 14, 1965 (aged 73); Allen Park, Michigan, U.S.
- Batted: Right Threw: Right

MLB debut
- September 11, 1913, for the St. Louis Cardinals

Last MLB appearance
- July 15, 1915, for the Washington Senators

MLB statistics
- Win–loss record: 0-4
- Strikeouts: 12
- Earned run average: 4.18
- Stats at Baseball Reference

Teams
- St. Louis Cardinals (1913–14); Washington Senators (1915)

William Booth Hopper (August 26, 1891, Jackson, Tennessee – January 14, 1965, Allen Park, Michigan) was an American Major League Baseball pitcher. He pitched parts of three seasons in the majors, from 1913 until 1915, for the St. Louis Cardinals and Washington Senators. He is buried in Browns Cemetery in Jackson, Tennessee.
