= Connecticut Association =

1910 American minor league baseball team

- Classification: Class D (1910)
- Sport: Minor League Baseball
- First season: 1910
- Folded: August 4, 1910
- President: Daniel Dunn (1910)
- No. of teams: 5
- Country: United States of America
- Most titles: 1 New London Whalers (1910)
- Related competitions: Connecticut League

The Connecticut Association was a Class D level minor league baseball league that played in the 1910 season. The four–team Connecticut Association consisted of franchises based exclusively in Connecticut. The Connecticut Association, also called the Eastern Connecticut League, folded during their charter season.

== History ==
The Connecticut Association began play in the 1910 season, formed as a Class D level league, with Daniel Dunn serving as league president. Dunn also served as manager of the Willimantic Colts.

The 1910 Connecticut Association was a four–team league that began play on May 10, 1910. The league was formed with the Middletown Jewels, New London Whalers, Norwich Bonbons and Willimantic Colts as charter members. On July 10, 1910, the Norwich Bonbons disbanded. The Norwich team was transferred to Meriden, Connecticut on July 15, 1910, with the franchise playing as the Meriden Doublins. Meriden disbanded on July 24, 1914. The Connecticut Association permanently disbanded on August 4, 1910.

The New London Whalers were in first place when the Connecticut Association folded on August 4, 1910. New London finished with a record of 32–25 under manager Charles Hupmhrey. New London was followed by the Middletown Jewels (26–24), Norwich Bonbons / Meriden Doublins (19–25) and Willimantic Colts (19–28) in the final league standings.

The Reach Official American League Guide publication (p.553) listed Middletown as the Connecticut Association winner with a 35–30 record, citing the season ending on September 10,1910.

The Connecticut Association did not return to play after folding in 1910.

== Connecticut Association teams ==
Team name	City represented	Ballpark	Year
Middletown Jewels	Middletown, Connecticut	Unknown	1910
New London Whalers	New London, Connecticut	Riverside Park	1910
Meriden Doublins	Meriden, Connecticut	Meriden Ball Park	1910
Norwich Bonbons	Norwich, Connecticut	Unknown	1910
Willimantic Colts	Willimantic, Connecticut	Unknown	1910

== Standings & statistics ==
=== 1910 Connecticut Association ===
Team standings	W	L	PCT	GB	Managers
New London Whalers	32	25	.561	–	Charles Humphrey
Middletown Jewels	26	24	.520	2½	Tom Bannon / Walter Bellis
Norwich Bonbons / Meriden Doublins	19	25	.413	6½	Dennis Hayes / John Stone; Patsey Flanagan
Willimantic Colts	19	28	.404	8	Daniel Dunn

Norwich (19–12) disbanded July 10; Norwich moved to Meriden July 15; Meriden disbanded July 24.
The season officially ended August 4.

Player statistics
Player	Team	Stat	Tot	Player	Team	Stat	Tot
O'Donnell	Willimantic	BA	.323	H Ferris	Middletown	W	17
Thomas Dunlap	Middletown	Runs	38	Fred Rieger	New London	W	17
J. Sullivan	Willimantic	Runs	38	Kid Smith	Norw./Willim.	Pct	.682; 15–7
Jim Nealon	New London	Hits	83				
Thomas Dunlap	Middletown	HR	4				
Harris	Middletown	SB	44				
