= Pop Foster =

American baseball player (1878–1944)

- Outfielder
- Born: April 8, 1878; New Haven, Connecticut, U.S.
- Died: April 16, 1944 (aged 66); Princeton, New Jersey, U.S.
- Batted: Right Threw: Right

MLB debut
- September 13, 1898, for the New York Giants

Last MLB appearance
- September 27, 1901, for the Chicago White Sox

MLB statistics
- Batting average: .281
- Home runs: 10
- Runs batted in: 137
- Stats at Baseball Reference

Teams
- New York Giants (1898–1900); Washington Senators (1901); Chicago White Sox (1901)

Clarence Francis "Pop" Foster (April 4, 1878 – April 16, 1944) was an American Major League Baseball outfielder who played for the New York Giants, Washington Senators and Chicago White Sox. He played a total of 18 seasons in baseball, four at the Major League level and 14 in minor league baseball.

== Professional career ==
=== New York Giants ===
Foster began his professional career with the New York Giants in 1898 at the age of 20. He batted .268 with 30 hits, six doubles and nine RBIs.

In 1899 Foster hit .296 with 89 hits, nine doubles, seven triples, three home runs 57 RBIs and seven stolen bases in 84 games. Foster established a career high in batting average.

In Foster's final season with the Giants in 1900 he hit .262 with 22 hits, three doubles and 11 RBIs in 31 games.

=== Washington Senators ===
1901 was a career year for Foster with the Washington Senators. He hit .278 with 109 hits, 16 doubles, nine triples, six home runs, 54 RBIs and 10 stolen bases in 103 games. Despite his good play Foster was released by the Senators on September 9, 1901.

=== Chicago White Stockings ===
The day Foster was released by the Senators, the Chicago White Sox of the American League signed Foster. He finished the season with Chicago batting .286 with 10 hits, two doubles, two triples, one home run and six RBIs. He finished the season with career highs in at bats, runs, hits, doubles, triples, home runs, RBIs, stolen bases, walks, on-base percentage, slugging percentage and on-base plus slugging.

=== Legacy ===
Foster did not appear in the majors after 1901. He continued to play in Minor League Baseball for 14 seasons. Foster made stops in Providence, Rhode Island, Montreal, Quebec, Bridgeport, Connecticut and Newark, New Jersey.

In 1907 Foster began to manage the Lancaster Red Roses of the Tri-State League. He would stay with the Red Roses until 1908. He retired in 1915 at the age of 37.

In 262 games in the major leagues, Foster hit .281 with 260 hits, 36 doubles, 20 triples, 10 home runs and 137 RBIs.

== Yale men's basketball coach ==
In addition to playing professional baseball, Foster also coached the Yale University men's basketball team for the 1912–13 collegiate basketball season. The Bulldogs finished with a 5–7 record in his lone season at the helm.
