= Hi Ladd =

American baseball player (1870–1948)

- Outfielder
- Born: February 9, 1870; Willimantic, Connecticut, U.S.
- Died: May 7, 1948 (aged 78); Cranston, Rhode Island, U.S.
- Batted: Left Threw: Right

MLB debut
- July 12, 1898, for the Pittsburgh Pirates

Last MLB appearance
- July 18, 1898, for the Boston Beaneaters

MLB statistics
- Games played: 2
- At bats: 5
- Hits: 1
- Stats at Baseball Reference

Teams
- Pittsburgh Pirates (1898); Boston Beaneaters (1898)

Arthur Clifford "Hi" Ladd (February 9, 1870 – May 7, 1948) was an American outfielder in Major League Baseball. He played for the Pittsburgh Pirates and Boston Beaneaters in 1898.
