= New London Whalers =

- 1898–1910; (1898–1907, 1910); New London, Connecticut

Minor league affiliations
- Previous classes: Class-D (1910); Class-B (1905–1907); Class-D (1902–1904); Class-F (1898–1901)
- League: Connecticut Association (1910); Connecticut State League (1904–1907); Connecticut League (1903); Connecticut State League (1900–1902); Connecticut League (1899); Connecticut State League (1898)

Minor league titles
- League titles: 1910

The New London Whalers were a minor league baseball team that played in New London, Connecticut from 1898 to 1910.
