= Hartford Senators =

- 1878–1934; (1878, 1884–1887, 1889–1891, 1895–1932, 1934); Hartford, Connecticut

Minor league affiliations
- Previous classes: Class-B (1934); Class-A (1919–1932); Class-B (1905–1914, 1916–1918); Class-D (1902–1904); Class-A (1899–1901); Class-B (1897–1898); Class-A (1896); Class-E (1891)
- League: Northeastern League (1934); Eastern League (1916–1932); Colonial League (1915); Eastern Association (1913–1914); Connecticut State League (1904–1912); Connecticut League (1903); Connecticut State League (1902); Eastern League (1899–1901); Atlantic League (1896–1898); Connecticut State League (1891, 1895); Atlantic Association (1889–1890); Eastern League (1886–1887); Southern New England League (1885); Connecticut State League (1884–1885); International Association (1878)

Major league affiliations
- Previous teams: Brooklyn Dodgers (1932)

Minor league titles
- League titles: 5 (1909, 1913, 1915, 1923, 1931)

Team data
- Previous names: Hartford Senators (1902–1932, 1934); Hartford Indians (1899–1901); Hartford Cooperatives (1898); Hartford Bluebirds (1895–1897); Hartford (1889–1891); Hartford Dark Blues (1886–1887); Hartford Babies (1885); Hartford (1878, 1884)
- Previous parks: Bulkeley Stadium aka Clarkin Field (II); Wethersfield Avenue Baseball Grounds aka Clarkin Field (I)

The Hartford Senators were a minor league baseball team based in Hartford, Connecticut. They operated in the Connecticut League from 1902 to 1912, the Eastern Association from 1913 to 1914, the Eastern League from 1916 to 1932 and the Northeastern League in 1934. For the 1932 season they were affiliated with the Brooklyn Dodgers.

The team's most famous players were future Hall of Famers Lou Gehrig (who played for the Senators on three occasions before being a starting first baseman for the New York Yankees) and Hank Greenberg. The team won league championships in 1909, 1913, 1923 and 1931. The 1931 Senators were recognized as one of the 100 greatest minor league teams of all time.

== History ==
The March 12, 1933 Hartford Courant obituary of James H. Clarkin, "quarter of a century owner of the Hartford Baseball Club", indicates that he sold both the Eastern League Franchise and Clarkin Field (now the Bulkeley Stadium) when he retired in 1928. Clarkin entered league baseball in 1904 when he purchased the league franchise from William J. Tracey of Bristol, CT, as a partner, but soon after was the sole owner of The Hartford Club. "Although he had many acrimonious disputes with fellow magnates, he came to their assistance in more than one crisis and saved the Eastern League during the World War, when the league's fortunes were at a low ebb. Money furnished by Mr. Clarkin kept two of the other franchises in operation, and the Eastern League road out the storm." Hartford was in the old Connecticut State League when Clarkin took over, then in the Colonial League, the Eastern Association, and then the Eastern League. Some of the well known players "graduated from his direction to fame in the big leagues" were Ray Fisher, Hughie High, Walter (Kid) Rehg, "Buck" O'Brien, Walter Leverenz, Leo Durocher, Heinie Scheer and Pete Wilson. "Lou Gehrig, first baseman and home run hitter of the New York Yankees made his name in league ball under Jim Clarkin" starring for the Hartford Senators in 1923-24 and drawing big crowds to Wethersfield Avenue Grounds (also known as Hartford Baseball Park). "Jim Thorpe, famous Redskin, was another notable who wore a Hartford uniform during the 1922 season." Many well known men grew up as managers in Hartford under Clarkin, among them were Bob Connery, "now president of the St. Paul (Minn.) club"; Dan Howley, later manager of the Cincinnati Reds; Si McDonald, Paddy O'Connor, Jack Coffey, Chet Thomas, Arthur Irwin, Tom Dowd, Danny Murphy of the Philadelphia Athletics fame.

Three pennants were brought to Hartford under Clarkin's ownership of the club. Bob Connery was the first to win a championship for Clarkin in 1901, Si McDonald repeated in 1913, and Paddy O'Connor of Springfield won the Eastern League championship in 1923. "His salary roll in 1923 set a new high mark for the Eastern League" Mr. Clarkin replaced the old Wethersfield Ave grounds in 1921, at Hanmer and George Sts, off of Franklin Ave., "a few minutes walk from the former field". He had a fine playing surface laid out and erected one of the best minor league structures in the country, with a stand of steel and concrete, dressing rooms, shower baths and complete modern equipment. Although not ready for the opening game in 1921 and for some two weeks, the Senators played all their games on the road, returning to Hartford for a gala opening. "In 1927, fire destroyed the stand and fence at Clarkin Field but was rebuilt at once. The new stand erected in less than a month, and the Senators had a home again after having played at Trinity Field and in Manchester during the interval" Tribute was paid to Clarkin by Jack Coffey, his manager in 1922 and graduate manager of athletics at Fordham University, who said, "He had many endearing qualities hidden from those who did not know him intimately."

== Vintage Base Ball team ==
The Hartford Senators were re-established in 2001 for the purpose of perpetuating, promoting, and playing the game of baseball as it was when it first existed. The Vintage Base Ball Federation was founded by New York Yankees World Series pitcher Jim Bouton and funded by Mass Mutual Financial Group.

On August 19, 2007, at Bullens Field in Westfield, Massachusetts, the Hartford Senators won the 2007 World Series of Vintage Base Ball. The Senators defeated Division Champions from California, New Hampshire, Michigan, and Massachusetts to win the Pennant. Hall of Fame broadcaster Vin Scully called the 2007 Senators "The greatest Vintage team ever assembled." The Senators were led by players Chris "Grit" Moran, Steve “Big Train” Burke, Jeff "Bull" Durham, Matt "Crazy legs" March, Craig "Rabbit" Pinney, Robert "Streak" Silverberg, Nick "Hobbs" Roy, Brian "Flatfoot" Logan, Rob "Penguin" Miller, Ryan "Kid" Grew, David "Fleetwood" Chambers, Brendan "Pony" Canny, Brendon “Plywood” Moore, John “Eskimo” Quinn, and Mike "Broadway" Hickey. The Senators play home games at Colt Park in Hartford, Connecticut.

== Notable alumni ==
=== Baseball Hall of Fame alumni ===
- Jesse Burkett (1916) Inducted, 1946
- Roger Connor (1878) Inducted, 1976
- Candy Cummings (1875–1878) Inducted, 1939
- Hugh Duffy (1886) Inducted, 1945
- Leo Durocher (1925) Inducted, 1994
- Lou Gehrig (1921, 1923–1924) Inducted, 1939
- Hank Greenberg (1930) Inducted, 1956
- Connie Mack (1885–1886) Inducted, 1937

=== Notable alumni ===
- Pete Appleton (1927)
- Huck Betts (1923)
- George Bradley (1878) ERA Title
- Oyster Burns (1897)
- Jim Delahanty (1915)
- Bill Donovan (1900) 1901 NL Wins Leader; NY Yankee Manager
- Tommy Dowd
- Duke Esper (1900)
- Bob Ferguson (1877)
- Ray Fisher (1909)
- Patsy Flaherty (1900)
- Joe Gerhardt (1889)
- George Gore (1878) Batting Title
- Ray Grimes (1918)
- Heinie Groh (1929)
- George Hemming (1901)
- Arthur Irwin (1921)
- Fielder Jones (1896) Player/Manager: 1906 World Series Champion Chicago White Sox
- Benny Kauff (1913)
- Matt Kilroy (1899) 1887 Wins Leader
- Arlie Latham (1898)
- Bill Lohrman (1934)
- Carl Lundgren (1912)
- Van Mungo (1931) 5 x MLB All-Star
- Jim Mutrie (1878) Manager: 2 x World Series Champion New York Giants
- Billy Nash (1899)
- Paul Radford(1897)
- Billy Shindle (1900–1901)
- George Shoch (1901)
- Mose Solomon (1925)
- Joe Start (1877)
- Scott Stratton (1900) 1890 ERA Leader
- Harry Stovey (1878)
- Ezra Sutton (1890)
- Ira Thomas (1903)
- Tuck Turner (1901)
- Russ Van Atta (1928)
- Heinie Wagner (1916)
- Tom York (1875)
