= Steamer Flanagan =

American baseball player (1881–1947)

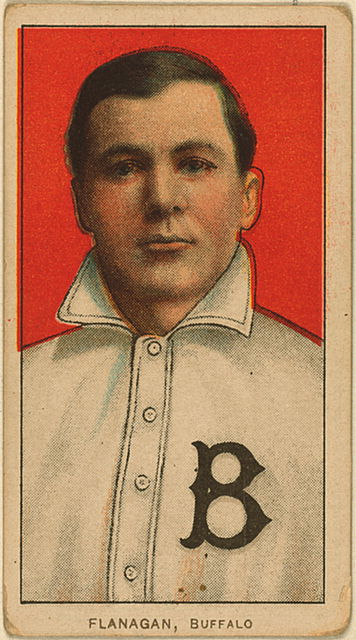
- Outfielder
- Born: April 20, 1881; Kingston, Pennsylvania, U.S.
- Died: April 21, 1947 (aged 66); Wilkes-Barre, Pennsylvania, U.S.
- Batted: Left Threw: Left

MLB debut
- September 25, 1905, for the Pittsburgh Pirates

Last MLB appearance
- October 7, 1905, for the Pittsburgh Pirates

MLB statistics
- Batting average: .280
- Home runs: 0
- Runs batted in: 3
- Stats at Baseball Reference

Teams
- Pittsburgh Pirates (1905)

James Paul Flanagan (April 20, 1881 – April 21, 1947) was an American Major League Baseball center fielder. He played for the Pittsburgh Pirates just at the end of the 1905 season (September 25-October 7). The 24-year-old rookie, who stood 6 ft 1 in (1.85 m) and weighed 185 lbs., was a native of Kingston, Pennsylvania, and attended the University of Notre Dame.

Flanagan played well during his time with the Pirates. In seven games he hit .280 (7-for-25) with one double, one triple, three runs batted in, and seven runs scored. He also had three stolen bases. In the field he handled 19 chances flawlessly for a fielding percentage of 1.000.

Two of his famous teammates on the Pirates were future Hall of Famers Honus Wagner and Fred Clarke.

Flanagan died at the age of 66 in Wilkes-Barre, Pennsylvania.

== Nickname ==
According to SABR research, his unusual nickname was due to his speed on the bases and his large size, comparing him to a steam locomotive.
