= Holyoke Paperweights =

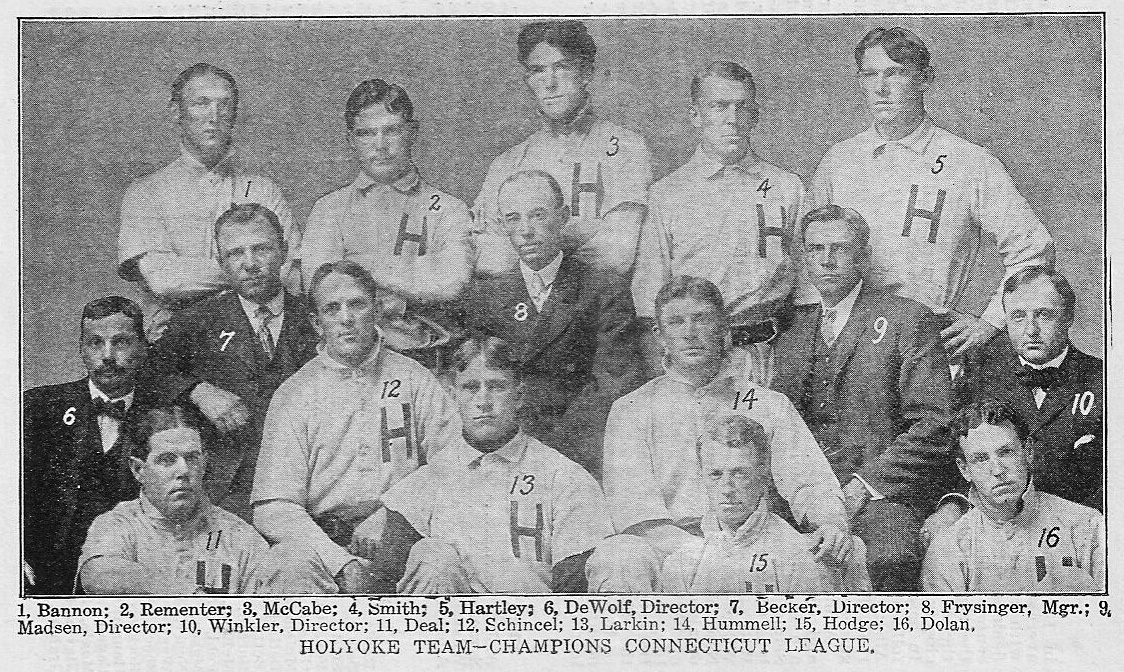
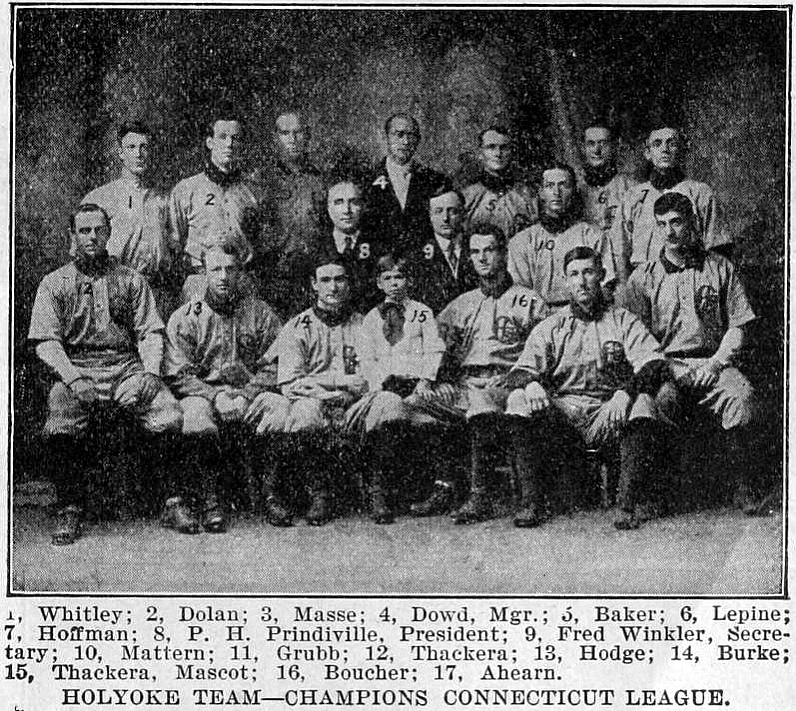
The 1905 Paperweights (top), and 1907 Papermakers, champions of the Connecticut League for those seasons

The Holyoke Paperweights were a professional minor league baseball team based in Holyoke, Massachusetts, USA, that played in the now defunct Connecticut League from 1903 to 1911. From 1907 to 1911, they were also known as the Papermakers. The team won the league pennant of the 1905 and 1907 seasons. The Paperweights and Papermakers were preceded by the 1884 Holyoke team of the Massachusetts State Association.

In June 1911, the Connecticut League ejected the Northampton and Holyoke clubs for "failure to pay their debts." In 1912, the league's Waterbury team moved to Holyoke. They continued play as the Papermakers until July 1913, when they moved to Meriden. The team folded after the season.
