= Jack Hoey =

American baseball player (1881–1947)

- Outfielder
- Born: November 10, 1881; Watertown, Massachusetts, U.S.
- Died: November 14, 1947 (aged 66); Waterbury, Connecticut, U.S.
- Batted: Left Threw: Left

MLB debut
- June 27, 1906, for the Boston Americans

Last MLB appearance
- October 7, 1908, for the Boston Red Sox

MLB statistics
- Batting average: .232
- Hits: 116
- Runs batted in: 35
- Stats at Baseball Reference

Teams
- Boston Americans/Red Sox (1906–1908)

John Bernard Hoey (November 10, 1881 – November 14, 1947) was an American outfielder in Major League Baseball who played from 1906 through 1908 for the Boston Americans/Red Sox. Listed at 5 ft 9 in (1.75 m), 185 lb., Hoey batted and threw left-handed. A native of Watertown, Massachusetts, he was signed by Boston out of the College of the Holy Cross.

In a three-season career, Hoey was a .232 hitter (116-for-500) with 39 runs and 35 RBI in 146 games, including 10 doubles, five triples and 13 stolen bases. He did not hit a home run. He also made 126 outfield appearances at left field (111), right (11) and center (4), committing 19 error in 218 chances for a collective .913 fielding percentage.

Hoey died in Waterbury, Connecticut at age 66.

== Sources ==
- Baseball Reference
- Retrosheet
