= Billy Lush (baseball) =

American baseball player (1873–1951)

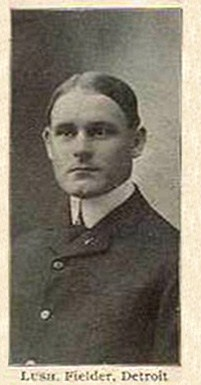
- Outfielder
- Born: November 10, 1873; Bridgeport, Connecticut, U.S.
- Died: August 28, 1951 (aged 77); Hawthorne, New York, U.S.
- Batted: Switch Threw: Right

MLB debut
- September 3, 1895, for the Washington Senators

Last MLB appearance
- October 8, 1904, for the Cleveland Naps

MLB statistics
- Batting average: .249
- Runs batted in: 152
- Home Runs: 8
- Stats at Baseball Reference

Teams
- Washington Senators (1895–1897); Boston Beaneaters (1901–1902); Detroit Tigers (1903); Cleveland Naps (1904)

William Lucas Lush (November 10, 1873 – August 28, 1951) was an American baseball player and college athletics coach and administrator. He played seven seasons of Major League Baseball from 1895 to 1904, including three with the Washington Senators. He later worked as a college athletics coach (mostly baseball and basketball) at Yale University, Columbia University, Fordham University, the United States Naval Academy, St. John's University, the University of Baltimore and Trinity College, Hartford. He also held athletic director positions at Fordham and the Naval Academy. In the 1930s, he coached athletic teams at Sing Sing prison in Ossining, New York.

== Early years ==
Lush was born at Bridgeport, Connecticut in 1873. His father, Charles H. Lush, was a Massachusetts native who worked in a sewing machine factory. At the time of the 1880 United States census, Lush, at age 7, was living in Bridgeport with his parents, Charles and Annie, and two younger brothers, Walter and George.

== Baseball player ==
Lush played seven seasons of Major League Baseball with the Washington Senators (1895–1897), Boston Beaneaters (1901–1902), Detroit Tigers (1903), and Cleveland Naps (1904). He appeared in 489 major league games, including 461 as an outfielder. He had a career batting average of .249 and an on-base percentage of .360 (fueled by 291 walks in 2,096 plate appearances). Lush led the American League with 34 sacrifice hits for the Tigers in 1903. His .379 on-base percentage for the Tigers in 1903 was fourth best in the American League, and his 70 bases on balls was second best in the league. Lush was among the league leaders in walks four times. Lush was also a good fielder in the outfield. In 1902, Lush had 24 assists as the Beaneaters' center fielder, and a range factor of 2.37 (0.44 points higher than the league average). For the Tigers in 1903, Lush had a range factor of 2.42 (0.50 points higher than the league average).

== Athletic coach ==
After his playing career ended, Lush became a coach of college baseball and college basketball. He held coaching positions at Yale University, Columbia University, Fordham University, the United States Naval Academy, St. John's College in Annapolis, Maryland, the University of Baltimore and Trinity College in Hartford, Connecticut.

Lush began work as Yale's baseball coach in 1905, with Walter Camp serving as the team's advisory coach. In his first year, Lush led Yale to its first baseball championship in six years. Lush played for and managed the Plattsburgh minor league franchise in 1905 and 1906. One of his players in 1906 was Baseball Hall of Fame member Eddie Collins. In February 1906, Yale engaged him for a term of three years. He remained in charge of the Yale baseball team in 1906 and 1907, but he was replaced by Tad Jones in 1908. Yale decided not to retain Lush when the school decided to cease using professional coaches. As Lush had another year remaining on his contract, Yale paid him in full for his services.

After separating from Yale, Lush coached the basketball team at the United States Naval Academy in the 1908–09 season. In February 1909, he was rehired as Yale's baseball coach. He remained the baseball coach at Yale through the 1911 season. He was dropped as Yale's baseball coach in August 1911.

In 1912, Lush was hired as the manager of the Montreal professional baseball team.

In 1914, Lush coached the baseball team at Columbia.

In the middle of the 1915 season, Lush took over as the coach of the baseball team at Fordham University. The team compiled an 8–2 record under Lush. In September 1915, he was hired as the physical director at Fordham. He assumed responsibility to oversee all branches of athletics at the school, including full responsibility for the baseball and track teams and assistant coaching duties with the football and crew programs. His contract stipulated, however, that he was allowed to coach that New York University basketball team in the winter of 1915–16. As permitted by his Fordham contract, Lush began coaching the NYU basketball team in November 1915.

In July 1916, Lush purchased a fifty percent interest in the baseball club at Bridgeport, Connecticut. He announced at the time that he would serve as the team's manager.

In November 1916, he was hired by the Naval Athletic Association to coach the baseball and basketball teams at the U.S. Naval Academy in Annapolis. Lush's 1918–19 basketball team finished the season with a 16–0 record and was retroactively listed as the top team of the season by the Premo-Porretta Power Poll. In May 1922, Lush resigned his position at the Naval Academy. The press reported there was mutual dissatisfaction between Lush and the Navy Athletic Association.

After leaving the Naval Academy, Lush coached the baseball and basketball teams at St. John's College in Maryland. By 1923, he had been placed in charge of athletics at St. John's. He was the basketball coach at St. John's through the 1926–27 season.

In October 1931, he was appointed as the head basketball coach at the University of Baltimore.

== Family and later life ==
Lush was married in approximately 1897 to Mary E. Lush (born September 1872), a fellow Connecticut native. They had five children, Mary (born c. 1900), Elizabeth (born c. 1901), William L., Jr. (born c. 1902), Frances A. (born c. 1904), Edward J. (born c. 1906).

At the time of the 1900 United States census, Lush was living in New Haven, Connecticut with his wife, Mary, and their daughter, Mary. His occupation was listed as a baseball player.

At the time of the 1910 United States census, Lush was living in New Haven and employed as a baseball coach.

In a draft registration card completed by Lush at the time of World War I, Lush indicated that his permanent residence was in New Haven, though he was employed as an athletic coach at the U.S. Naval Academy in Annapolis, Maryland.

At the time of the 1920 United States census, Lush listed his residence as New Haven and his occupation as the "physical director" for the Naval Academy. His household at that time consisted of his wife, Mary, and four children, Elizabeth, William, Frances and Edward.

At the time of the 1930 United States census, Lash was living in New Haven with his wife, Mary. His occupation was listed as a cigar maker in a cigar factory.

In the 1930s, Lush moved to Ossining, New York, where he coached athletic teams and assisted in the medical department at Sing Sing prison. He later operated a tea room and guest house in Ossining. In August 1951, Lush died at a convalescent home in Hawthorne, New York at age 77. He was survived by his second wife, Lillian Goodwin Lush, and six children.
