= John Meister =

American baseball player (1863–1923)

- Second baseman
- Born: May 10, 1863; Allentown, Pennsylvania, U.S.
- Died: January 28, 1923 (aged 59); Philadelphia, Pennsylvania, U.S.
- Batted: Unknown Threw: Unknown

MLB debut
- August 24, 1886, for the New York Metropolitans

Last MLB appearance
- June 29, 1887, for the New York Metropolitans

MLB statistics
- Batting average: .230
- Home runs: 3
- Runs batted in: 42
- Stats at Baseball Reference

Teams
- New York Metropolitans (1886–1887)

John F. Meister (May 10, 1863 – January 17, 1923) was an American professional baseball player. Meister was a second baseman for the New York Metropolitans of Major League Baseball in the 1886 and 1887 seasons.

He was born in Allentown, Pennsylvania on May 10, 1863, the third son of Charles and Louisa Meister. After his baseball career was over, Meister owned a liquor store, a tavern, and then a restaurant.
