= Gene McCann =

American baseball player (1876-1943)

- Pitcher
- Born: June 13, 1876; Baltimore, Maryland, U.S.
- Died: April 26, 1943 (aged 66); New York City, New York, U.S.
- Batted: Unknown Threw: Right

MLB debut
- April 19, 1901, for the Brooklyn Superbas

Last MLB appearance
- April 28, 1902, for the Brooklyn Superbas

MLB statistics
- Win–loss record: 3–5
- Earned run average: 2.95
- Strikeouts: 18
- Stats at Baseball Reference

Teams
- Brooklyn Superbas (1901–1902)

Henry Eugene McCann (June 13, 1876 – April 26, 1943) was an American professional baseball player and scout. He played in Major League Baseball as a right-handed pitcher. Born in Baltimore, Maryland, he pitched in nine games for the Brooklyn Superbas during the 1901 and 1902 baseball seasons. He later became a scout for the New York Yankees under manager Joe McCarthy. He died at age 66 in New York City.
