= Swat McCabe =

American baseball player (1881–1944)

- Outfielder
- Born: November 20, 1881; Towanda, Pennsylvania, U.S.
- Died: December 9, 1944 (aged 63); Bristol, Connecticut, U.S.
- Batted: Left Threw: Right

MLB debut
- September 23, 1909, for the Cincinnati Reds

Last MLB appearance
- May 20, 1910, for the Cincinnati Reds

MLB statistics
- Batting average: .326
- Home runs: 0
- RBI: 5
- Stats at Baseball Reference

Teams
- Cincinnati Reds (1909–1910)

James Arthur "Swat" McCabe (November 20, 1881 – December 9, 1944) was an American Major League Baseball player. He played centerfield in three games for the 1909 Cincinnati Reds and in 13 games for the 1910 Cincinnati Reds.
