= Frank Grant (baseball) =

American baseball player (1865–1937)

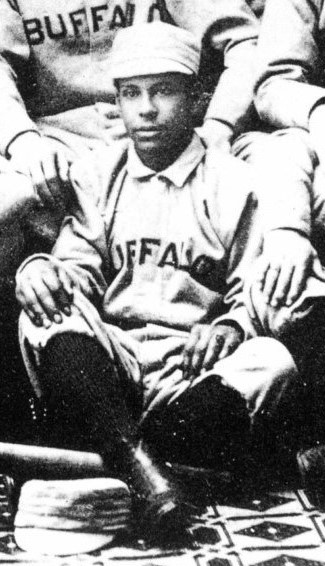
- Grant in 1887
- Second baseman
- Born: August 1, 1865; Pittsfield, Massachusetts, U.S.
- Died: May 27, 1937 (aged 71); New York City, New York, U.S.
- Batted: Right Threw: Right

Negro Leagues debut
- 1889, for the Cuban Giants

Last Negro leagues appearance
- 1903, for the Philadelphia Giants
- Stats at Baseball Reference

Teams
- Meriden Silvermen (1886); Buffalo Bisons (1886); Buffalo Bisons (1887–1888); Cuban Giants (1889, 1891–1897, 1899); New York Big Gorhams (1891); Page Fence Giants (1891); Cuban X-Giants (1899); Philadelphia Giants (1902–1903); Brooklyn Royal Giants (1907); New York Gorhams; Colored Capital All-Americans; Genuine Cuban Giants

Member of the National

Baseball Hall of Fame
- Induction: 2006
- Election method: Committee on African-American Baseball

Ulysses Franklin Grant (August 1, 1865 – May 27, 1937) was an American professional baseball player in the 19th century. Early in his career, he was a star player in the International League, shortly before race-based restrictions were imposed that banned African-American players from organized baseball. Grant then became a pioneer in the early Negro leagues, starring for several of the top African-American teams of the late 19th and early 20th centuries. He is widely considered to have been the greatest African-American player of the 19th century. In 2006, Grant was elected to the National Baseball Hall of Fame.

== Baseball career ==
Grant was born in Pittsfield, Massachusetts. He played semipro baseball in Pittsfield and in Plattsburgh, New York.

In 1886, Grant played for the Meriden Silvermen team of the Eastern League, based in Meriden, Connecticut. After Meriden folded during the season. Grant signed with the Buffalo Bisons in the International League, one level below the major leagues. Though most sources indicate the official integration of organized baseball would not come for several more decades, Grant was one of five black players who played in baseball's otherwise white minor leagues at the time. When he debuted with the team, a Buffalo newspaper reporter referred to Grant as "a Spaniard". His batting average was .344 with Buffalo that season.

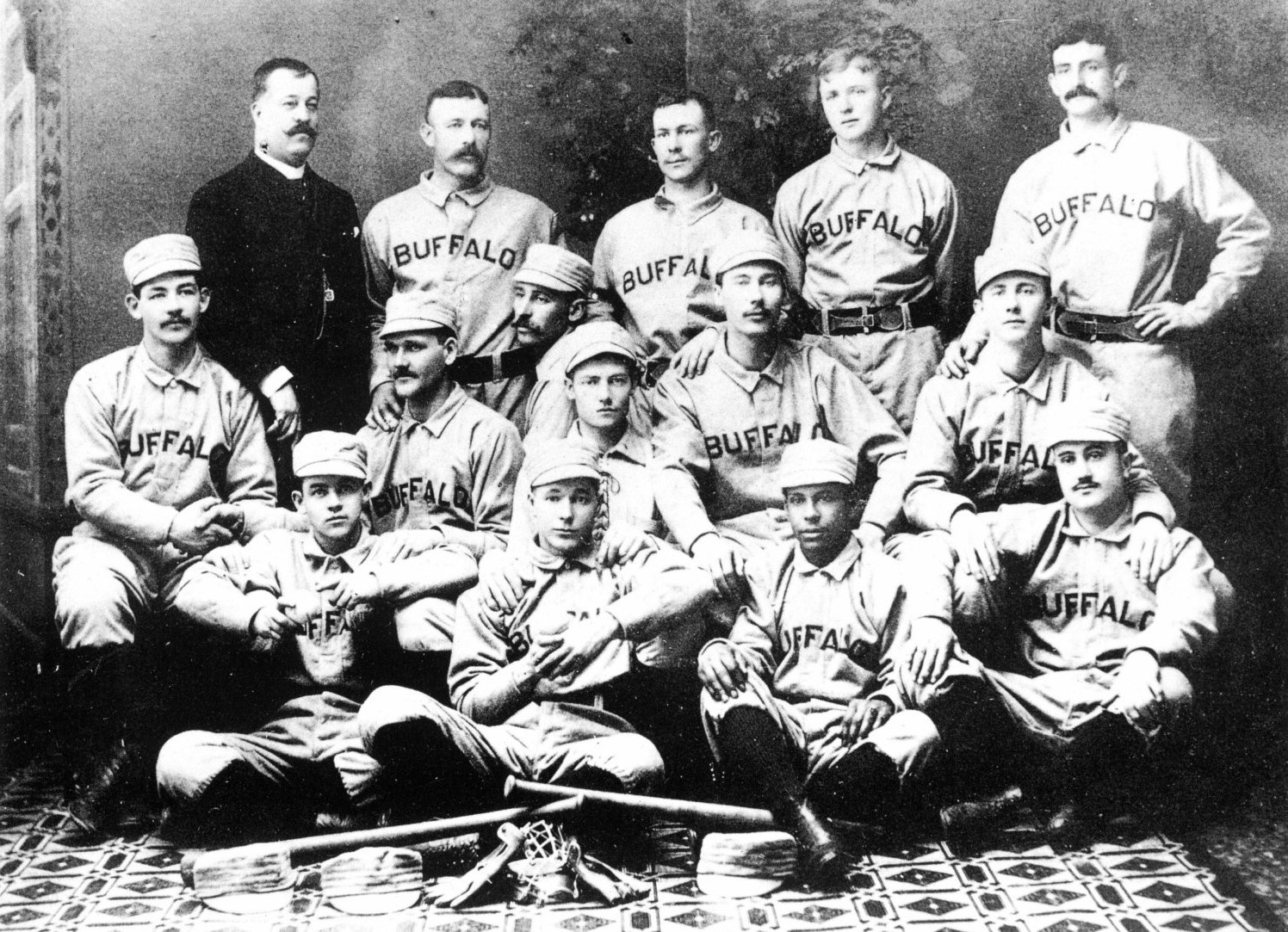
Grant (front row, second from right) with the 1887 Buffalo Bisons. The following season, his teammates refused to appear with him for another photo.

In an April 1887 preseason game against the Philadelphia Phillies at the Jefferson Street Grounds, Grant homered and was cited for his "remarkable fielding." During the 1887 season, the 22-year-old batted .353, paced the IL with 11 home runs and 49 extra-base hits, and led Buffalo with 40 stolen bases. In 1887, Jack Chapman, the Bisons' veteran manager, valued Grant's services at $5,000—a compliment when Chicago had recently sold superstar King Kelly to Boston for $10,000. During the 1887 season, Grant hit for the cycle in one game and stole home twice in another. Despite significant racial turmoil that year, Buffalo forced the IL to rescind a proposed color line to keep Grant in town.

By 1888, anti-black sentiment was all around the league, and it seemed only Buffalo argued against segregation (possibly because of Grant). While with the Bisons, Grant led the team in batting average every year but was disliked by his teammates. He frequently faced hostile opponents who tried to injure him on the field. When blacks were banned from organized, white-controlled baseball in 1889, Grant went on to become a successful Negro leaguer for the Cuban Giants, Cuban X-Giants, Big Gorhams, Brooklyn Royal Giants, and Philadelphia Giants into the 20th century. His career ended in 1903.

Author Jerry Malloy described Grant as "the greatest Negro baseball player of the 19th century." In the late 19th century, few black hitters matched up with Grant. He had substantial power at the plate, often hitting home runs and very often getting extra-base hits. Grant hit for extra bases every four times he got a hit. He achieved this even though he was quite small (5'7", 155 pounds).

A middle infielder, mostly a second baseman, Grant had fielding skills widely praised as the best in the league. He was known as "The Black Dunlap", a comparison drawn to the defensive skills of 19th-century white second baseman Fred Dunlap. Grant is also notable for becoming the first black player to play on the same team in organized baseball for three consecutive seasons.

== Later life ==
After his baseball career, Grant's name rarely appeared in the press. He lived a quiet life as a waiter for a catering company. Grant died at age 71 in New York City. His grave in East Ridgelawn Cemetery, Clifton, New Jersey, was unmarked until June 2011.

In 2006, Grant was elected to the National Baseball Hall of Fame. He is the earliest Negro league player to have received that honor.

== See also ==
- Bud Fowler
- Moses Fleetwood Walker
- Sol White
