= Tom Stankard =

American football and baseball player (1882–1958)

- Shortstop / Third baseman
- Born: March 20, 1882; Waltham, Massachusetts, U.S.
- Died: June 13, 1958 (aged 76); Waltham, Massachusetts, U.S.
- Batted: Right Threw: Right

MLB debut
- July 2, 1904, for the Pittsburgh Pirates

Last MLB appearance
- July 26, 1904, for the Pittsburgh Pirates

MLB statistics
- Batting average: .000
- Home runs: 0
- Runs batted in: 0
- Stats at Baseball Reference

Teams
- Pittsburgh Pirates (1904)

Thomas Francis Stankard (March 20, 1882 – June 13, 1958) was an American football and baseball player. He played college football and baseball at the College of the Holy Cross. In 1903, he compiled a .412 batting average for the Holy Cross baseball team and was selected by Walter Camp as a third-team halfback on his 1903 College Football All-America Team. In July 1904, he appeared in two games in Major League Baseball with the Pittsburgh Pirates, compiling no hits in two plate appearances. He also played 11 seasons and more than 1,000 games as a first and second baseman in minor league baseball from 1904 to 1914, including stints with the Springfield Ponies (1906–08, 1913–14), Denver Grizzlies (1909) and Holyoke Papermakers (1912).
