= Bridgeport Orators (baseball) =

- 1898–1912; (1885–1888, 1895–1914, 1916–1932); Bridgeport, Connecticut

Minor league affiliations
- Class: Independent (1885–1888, 1895–1896); Class F (1897–1901); Class D (1902–1904); Class B (1905–1918); Class A (1919–1932)
- League: Southern New England League (1885); Eastern League (1885–1887); Connecticut State League (1888, 1895); Naugatuck Valley League (1896); Connecticut State League (1897–1912); Eastern Association (1913–1914); Eastern League (1916–1932)

Major league affiliations
- Team: New York Giants (1932)

Minor league titles
- League titles (3): 1895; 1896; 1904
- Division titles (2): 1887; 1930
- Wild card berths (1): 1930

Team data
- Name: Bridgeport Giants (1885–1888); Bridgeport Victors (1895–1896); Bridgeport Soubrettes (1897); Bridgeport Orators (1898–1912); Bridgeport Crossmen (1913–1914); Bridgeport Hustlers (1916); Bridgeport Americans (1917–1923); Bridgeport Bears (1924–1932)
- Ballpark: Barnum Grounds (1885–1888, 1895–1897); Newfield Park (1898–1914, 1916–1932)

The Bridgeport Orators were an early minor league baseball team based in Bridgeport, Connecticut. The Bridgeport "Orators" teams played from 1895 to 1912 as members of the Connecticut State League, with the 1896 Naugatuck Valley League season included, as the league remained intact but briefly changed names.

The team became known by the unique "Orators" nickname beginning in 1895, as that was the nickname of Bridgeport team owner and manager, Baseball Hall of Fame member Jim "The Orator" O'Rourke. O'Rourke also served simultaneously as the league president for numerous seasons.

Beginning with the 1895 Bridgeport Orators season, Bridgeport hosted a minor league team in every subsequent season through 1932, with the exception of the 1915 season that was interrupted by World War I. Aside from the Orators era, Bridgeport minor league teams played under various nicknames as members of the Southern New England League (1885), Eastern League (1885–1887), Connecticut State League (1888), Eastern Association (1913–1914) and Eastern League (1916–1932).

The early Bridgeport teams won three championships in 40 seasons of play, with Jim O'Rourke leading the Orators teams to Connecticut State League championships in the 1895, 1896 and 1904 seasons.

In 1903, Jim O'Rourke and his son Jimmy O'Rourke both played for the Bridgeport Orators and became the first known father and son to play together in a professional baseball game.

Baseball Hall of Fame member Ed Walsh managed the 1920 Bridgeport Bears and made the final professional appearances of his pitching career.

The early Bridgeport teams all hosted their home minor league games at the Barnum Grounds through 1897 on property owned by P.T. Barnum. In 1898, Bridgeport began play at Newfield Park, which was built by Jim O'Rourke on property that he owned. The site still hosts baseball today.

In their final season, the 1932 Bridgeport Bears were officially a minor league affiliate of the New York Giants.

== History ==
=== Early teams ===
Bridgeport hosted town baseball teams as early as 1866. A Bridgeport native, Jim "The Orator" O'Rourke first played for the Bridgeport Ironsides team during the 1866 season at age 15.

=== 1885: First season / Two leagues ===
Minor league baseball play began in Bridgeport in 1885. In their first season, the Bridgeport team played in two separated leagues during the season. The Bridgeport Giants team first became members of the independent level Southern New England League to begin the season. The Bridgeport "Giants" joined with the Hartford Babies, Meriden Maroons, New Britain and Springfield and Waterbury teams in forming the new league. The league schedule began on May 2, 1885.

Bridgeport's 1885 Southern New England League season was a successful beginning, playing under manager Dan Shannon until the team left the league. On August 13, 1885, Bridgeport ended their membership in the league after compiling a 33–25 record. Bridgeton left the Southern New England League and immediately joined another league.

Leaving the Southern New England League on August 13, 1885, Bridgeport immediately became members of the Eastern League, as The Giants began Eastern League play on August 14. The Bridgeport Giants joined the Jersey City Skeeters, Lancaster Lancasters, Newark Domestics, Norfolk, Richmond Virginias, Trenton Trentonians, Washington Nationals, Waterbury and Wilmington Blue Hens teams in the league. The league had begun play on May 1. 1885. The Jersey City, Norfolk, Waterbury and Wilmington franchised did not play complete seasons in the league.

During their tenure in the Eastern League to finish the 1885 season, the Giants compiled a record of 12–17, with Dan Shannon continuing as the manager after the move to the second league. The Washington Nationals won the league championship with a 70–25 record under manager Michael Scanlon.

After their departure from the Southern New England League, the Meriden Maroons won the league title with a 42–21 record. The league Southern New England League folded and reorganized on August 21. Four league members reformed as the Connecticut State League to finish the season, with a New Haven based team beginning play. The Connecticut State League played through September 10, 1885 and Meriden had the best record at 8–2.

=== 1886 & 1887: Eastern League ===
After joining the league in the middle of the prior season, the 1886 Bridgeport Giants continued play as members of the eight-team Eastern League. The league lost three members during the season and Bridgeport ended the season in fifth place with a record of 33–57. Bridgeport placed last of the five remaining teams when the season ended, as the Long Island (1–11), Meriden Maroons (12–34) and Providence Grays (7–14) teams folded during the season. The Newark Little Giants won the league championship with a 68–26 record.

James Donnelly served as the Bridgeport player/manager during the 1885 season, batting .193 in 13 games and compiling a 3.32 ERA while pitching 19 innings in three games for his team. Bridgeton pitcher and outfielder Joe Brown threw 397 innings for Bridgeton with a 2.23 ERA and had a 13–26 record, starting 40 games with 39 complete games. Playing the outfield, Brown batted .275 with two home runs in 91 games for Bridgeton. Brown had pitched briefly in the major leagues the prior two seasons with a 4–5 overall record for the Chicago White Stockings (1884) and Baltimore Orioles (1885), while batting .200 in a utility role.

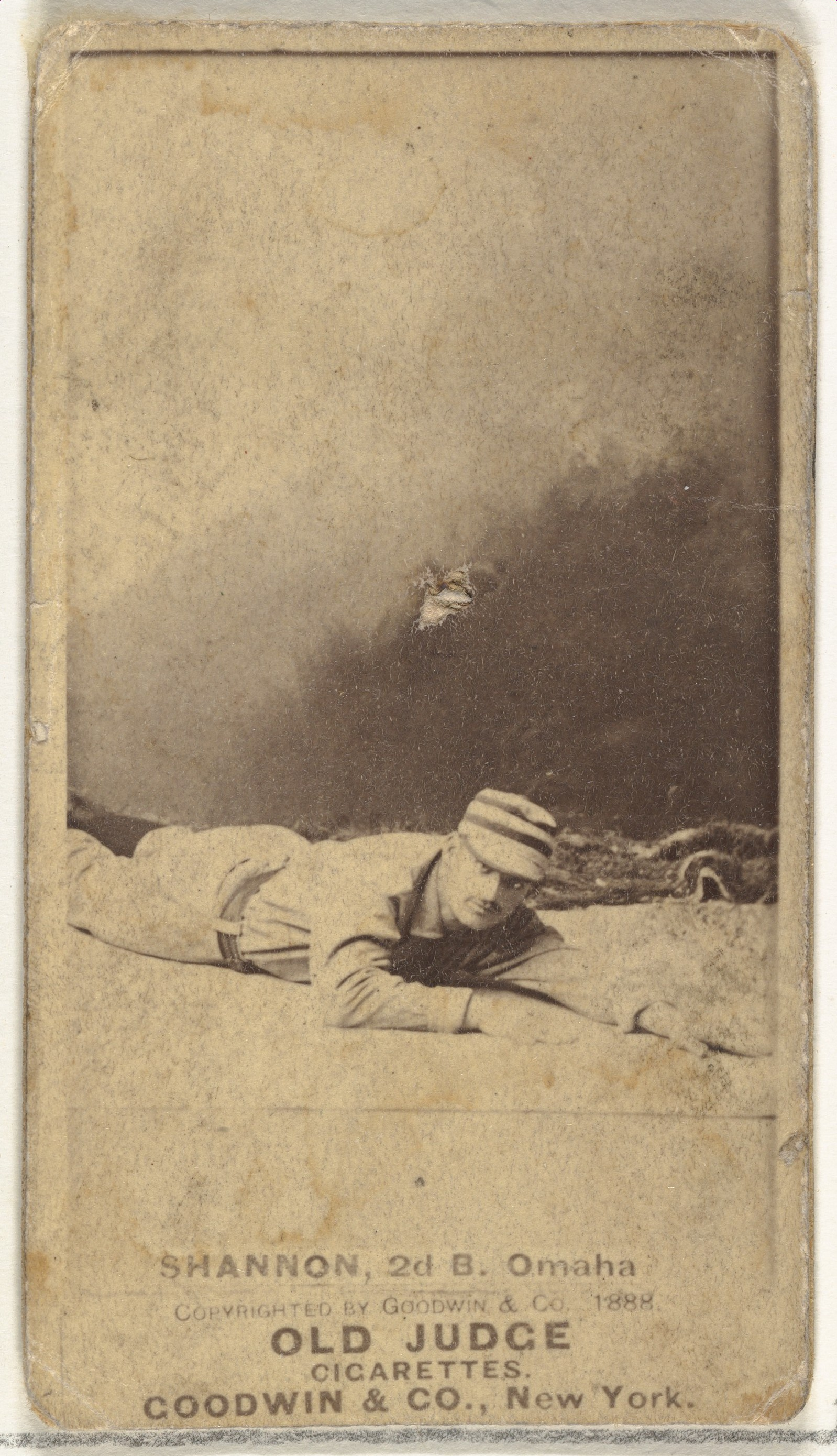
(1888) Dan Shannon,Omaha Omahogs, baseball card. Shannon was a Bridgeport native who served at player/manager of the Bridgeport Giants in 1885 and 1887 before advancing to the major leagues.

Bridgeport continued hosting minor league play in the 1887 Eastern League, but folded during the season despite having a strong team. The Bridgeport Giants played the season in the six-team league with the Danbury Hatters, Hartford, New Haven Blues, Springfield and Waterbury teams joined with Bridgeport in beginning league play on Saturday, April 30, 1887. Bridgeport began the 1887 season with a strong record of 20–5, but the franchise had poor home attendance and eventually folded during the season.

The Bridgeport Giants folded on July 6, 1887, after winning the first half pennant in the league standings. Bridgeport ended their Eastern League season with an overall record of 35–15, playing the shortened season under manager Dan Shannon, who returned to the team. After Bridgeport folded, no league playoffs were held, and the league had a tumultuous season as Hartford (July 30) also folded during the season. Earlier, the Springfield was "expelled" from the league on May 26, 1887. On July 20, 1887, the New Haven Blues folded from the league, which saw the remaining Danbury and Waterbury teams play through September 13.

After Bridgeport folded, the Oshkosh, Wisconsin franchise of the Northwestern League obtained Dan Shannon, Tug Wilson and Tom Lovett from Bridgeport roster. Lovett proceeded to pitch to a 20–2 record as Oshkosh won the league championship with Baseball Hall of Fame member Frank Selee as manager.

Dan Shannon was a Bridgeport native, who batted .286 with 46 stolen bases in 49 games for the Giants in 1887 before moving to play for Oshkosh. After his player/manager stint with the Bridgeport Giants, Shannon advanced to the major leagues. A second baseman, Shannon served as the player/manager for the 1889 Louisville Colonels and the 1891 Washington Statesmen. He also was a player only for the Philadelphia Athletics (1890) and the New York Giants (1890) in between his managerial stints. In 1899, while serving as the manager for the Buffalo Bisons in the International League, Shannon was fired by team ownership for "drunkenness." In 1913, Shannon died at age 48 in Bridgeport.

In his final professional season at age 28, Joe Brown returned to Bridgeport and played mostly as an outfielder while pitching in just 5 games. Brown batted .360 in 44 games in the shortened 1887 Bridgeport season.

=== 1888: First Connecticut State League season ===
After folding the prior season, the Bridgeport Giants reformed, and the team joined a new league in 1888 before relocating. The franchise played their first season as members of the Connecticut State League in 1888. The 1888 Connecticut State League season was short lived. The Giants joined with the Ansonia Cuban Giants, Danbury Hatters, Meriden, Norwalk and Waterbury teams in league play, as the season began on April 25, 1888.

During the Connecticut State League season, Bridgeport relocated in May and continued play after becoming the Stamford team. Stamford folded on June 27 and the league and folded for the season on July 25, 1888. The Bridgeport/Stamford was credited with a 9–9 overall record in the recorded standings as Meriden won the Connecticut State League title with a 9–3 record.

The Connecticut State League did not return to play in 1889, and Bridgeport was without a minor league team for the next six seasons.

=== 1895: Beginning of O'Rourke Bridgeport era / League championship ===
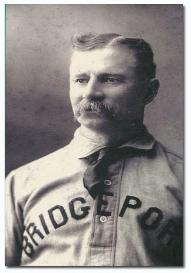
Portrait of Baseball Hall of Fame member Jim O'Rourke as Bridgeport manager. O'Rourke was the owner and manager and player with the Bridgeport franchise from 1895 to 1912 after concluding his 21-season major league career. In 1898, he built a new ballpark for the team on property that he owned.

The Connecticut State League reformed in the summer of 1895, with Jim O'Rourke organizing the league and serving as its president. A Bridgeport native, O'Rourke was a notable former major league player, who pursued a law degree while still continuing his baseball career. O'Rourke graduated from Yale Law School in 1887 with an LL.B.. He began practicing law in Bridgeport as time allowed between baseball commitments, With his law degree, O'Rourke became known by the nickname "Orator Jim." O'Rourke had been a major league baseball player and manager and was inducted into the Baseball Hall of Fame in 1945. O'Rourke had worked as an umpire in 1894 wanting to stay close to baseball. But he disliked umpiring and chose to form the Bridgeport team in his hometown for the 1895 season.

O'Rourke had played mostly in the outfield and sporadically around the infield while playing in the major leagues for 22 seasons, through the 1893 season. He retired with a .310 career batting average, compiling 2,639 hits, 1,208 RBIs, 62 home runs and 229 stolen bases in 1,999 career games. played with the Middletown Mansfields (1872), Boston Red Stockings (1873–1878), Providence Grays (1879), Boston Red Caps (1880), Buffalo Bisons (1881–1884), New York Giants (1885–1889), New York Giants (PL) (1890), New York Giants (NL) (1891–1892) and Washington Senators (1893). He also served as a player/manager for Buffalo in 1884 and Washington in 1893.

The 1895 Bridgeport team played as members of the four-team Connecticut State League, with O'Rourke also serving as the team's player/manager. In the era, the league was sometimes referred to as the shorter and interchangeable "Connecticut League." O'Rourke had been instrumental in forming the league for the 1895 season and reviving minor league baseball in Bridgeton and the neighboring region. The Bridgeport "Victors" were joined by the Hartford Bluebirds, Meriden Silvermen and Waterbury Brassmen in forming the Connecticut State League, and the league began play on July 2, 1895.

The 1895 season was the beginning of Jim O'Rourke owned Bridgeport teams, as he began serving as the Bridgeport player/manager, In his first season, O'Rourke led Bridgeport to the league championship in his first season with the team. The Victors were credited with an 8–3 final record, finishing 2.0 games ahead of the second place Meriden Silvermen in the final league standings.

In 1895, Harry Herbert was signed by Jim O'Rourke and began a four-year tenure with Bridgeton, becoming the first African American in the league.

Another Bridgeport native, Billy Lush played for his hometown team in 1895 at age 21. After his play with Bridgeport, Lush then made his major league debut with the Washington Senators at the end of the 1895 the season. Lush played in the major leagues through the 1904 season. Lush became the Yale College collegiate baseball coach beginning in 1905, with famed football pioneer Walter Camp as an advisor. Lush coached the 1905 Yale team to the Ivy League championship in his first season. Yale is located in nearby New Haven, Connecticut. Lush was the player/manager of the Plattsburgh minor league franchise in 1905 and 1906, where one of his players in 1906 was Baseball Hall of Fame member Eddie Collins. In February 1906, Yale extended Lush, giving him a three-year contract. Lush remained in charge of the Yale baseball team in 1906 and 1907. After leaving Yale, Lush became the basketball coach at the United States Naval Academy in the 1908–09 basketball season. In February 1909, he was rehired as Yale's baseball coach after a one-season hiatus. He remained as the baseball coach at Yale through the 1911 season. In 1916, Lush returned to Bridgeport when he purchased majority ownership in his hometown Bridgeport team from Gene McCann.

=== 1896: Second championship / League renamed ===
The Bridgeport Victors played the 1896 season as members of the Naugatuck Valley League, as the Connecticut State League was renamed. Jim O'Rourke was again president of the league in which his Bridgeport team played. The league's new name corresponded with the location of member teams being within the Naugatuck River Valley region of Connecticut. The Ansonia Welcomes, Derby Angels, New Haven Edgewoods, Torrington Tornados and Winsted Blues teams formed the newly named league, which began play on May 6, 1986.

The 1896 Bridgeport team won their second consecutive league championship, earning their nickname. The Victors had a final record of 25–15, finishing in first place in the six-team league as no league playoffs were held. The first place Bridgeport Victors, were again managed to the championship by Jim O'Rourke and finished 1.0 game ahead of the second place Torrington Tornados, who were managed by Hall of Fame member Candy Cummings.

Aside from being the league president, owning and operating the Bridgeport franchise, Jim O'Rourke also played. He played well and led the Naugatuck Valley League in hitting, batting .437 on the season to claim the batting title. Bridgeport's Thomas Ivers led the league with 5 home runs. Pop Foster and John Dougherty each scored 50 runs to league the league, while Doherty's 70 hits were the most in the league. Bridgeport pitcher Dick Mansfield led the league with 15 wins 127 strikeouts and a 1.95 ERA.

Born in nearby New Haven, Connecticut, Pop Foster played eight total seasons with Bridgeport from 1895 to 1899 and from 1903 to 1904. He played in the major leagues with the New York Giants (1898–1900), Washington Senators (1901) and Chicago White Sox (1901), batting .281 with 10 homer runs and a .341 OBP while appearing in 262 career major league games. Forster played and managed in the minor leagues until 1914 when he was age 37.

=== 1897: Return of Connecticut State League ===
The Bridgeport team continued play 1897, as the Connecticut State League returned to its original name, reforming as a six–team league. The Class F level league was organized with Sturgis Whitlock serving as league president instead of Jim O'Rourke. After the 1896 season, four of the Naugatuck Valley League teams continued play as members of the renamed 1897 league. The Bridgeport, Derby, Torrington and Winstead teams continued play in the new league, joined by Bristol and Meriden teams. In an era before formal team nicknames, the 1897 Bridgeport team continued play known as the "Misfits" or "Soubrettes" during the season. The new Bristol Braves, Meriden Bulldogs and Waterbury Indians teams completed the six-team league lineup.

The Bridgeport team finished in third place in the final standings as their championship run ended. Bridgeport compiled a 33–37 record and ended the season 14.0 games behind the championship winning Meriden Bulldogs in the final standings.

Playing at age 46, Bridgeport owner/manager/player Jim O'Rourke again won the Connecticut state League batting championship, hitting .403 with a league leading 130 total hits. Bridgeport's Terry Rogers hit a league leading 12 home runs and also added 40 stolen bases, most in the league. Continuing the team's strong offensive results, outfielder Patsy Cunningham of Bridgeport scored a league leading 94 runs. At age 23, Cunningham left professional baseball after the 1989 season and five seasons of playing for Bridgeport. Playing third base and shortstop, Terry Rogers played nine total seasons for Bridgeport between his first minor league season in 1895 to 1907. Rogers played his final season in 1909 at age 34.

=== 1898 to 1903: Connecticut State League ===
Beginning in the 1898 season, the Bridgeport "Orators" began playing their minor league home games at the newly constructed Newfield Park in the city. The ballpark was built on land owned by Jim O'Rourke and his older brother, John O'Rourke. Together, the brothers owned a large amount of land in the Newfield area of the city of Bridgeport. The northern portion of the land owned by Jim O'Rourke was used to as the site for the new ballpark. On Friday, May 13, 1898, the Bridgeport Orators and the Springfield Ponies of the Eastern League played an exhibition game to open the ballpark.

In their second season of membership, Bridgeport continued play as members of the 1898 Class F level Connecticut State League, continuing a sixteen-season tenure of consecutive membership in the league. The 1898 league expanded from a six-team league to become an eight–team league. The Bridgeport team became known as the "Orators" for the first time in honor of Jim O'Rourke. The league was still known as the interchangeable "Connecticut League" in the era. The Bridgeport Orators joined with the Danbury Hatters, Derby Angels, Meriden Bulldogs, New Britain Rangers, New Haven Blues, New London Whalers and Waterbury Pirates teams in beginning the league schedule on May 4, 1898.

In returning to play in the 1898 Connecticut State League, the Bridgeport Orators placed a close fourth in the final standings. The Orators ended the season with a record of 51–45, playing the season under managers Tim Ivers and Jim O'Rourke. Bridgeport ended the season just 5 1/2 games behind the first place Waterbury Pirates (55–38) in the final standings, as no league playoffs were held. Bridgeport right-handed pitcher Phil Corcoran had a 17–6 record to lead the Connecticut State League in victories.

A New Haven, Connecticut native, Phil Corcoran pitched for Bridgeport at age 25 in 1898, his first season with the franchise. He pitched for three total seasons for Bridgeport before joining his hometown New Haven team in 1904. He pitched for New Haven through the 1911 season when he was 37 years old, winning 26 games in 1906. In 1909 Corcoran was the player manager for the New Haven Black Crows.

At age 39, Third baseman Jerry Denny played for Bridgeport in 1898 before becoming the player/manager for the Derby Angels during the season. He returned to play for Bridgeton in 1902 after managing Derby through the 1901 season. in his 16-season major league career, Denny played for the Providence Grays (1881–1885), St. Louis Maroons (1886), Indianapolis Hoosiers (1887–1889), New York Giants (1890–1891), Cleveland Spiders (1891), Philadelphia Phillies (1891) and Louisville Colonels (1893–1894), batting .260 with 74 home runs and 1,284 career hits. Denny was considered an outstanding fielding third baseman ibn his major league career. In 1890, Sporting Life sportswriter John B. Foster called Denny "the King of the Third Basemen" in a feature article, saying "No third baseman ever has lived, who could equal Jerry Denny in making plays at third base."

In continuing play in the 1899 Connecticut State League, Tim Murnane became the league president. The Bridgeport Orators placed seventh as Jim O'Rourke again managed the team that he owned. Continuing play in the 1899 Connecticut State League, the Orators compiled a record of 43–55 under the returning O'Rourke. The Bridgeport Orators finished 14 1/2 games behind the first place New Haven Blues in the final standings. No league playoffs were held, as was common in the era. Outfielder Pete Woodruff had 11 home runs to lead the league while playing for both the New London Whalers and Bridgeport. Woodruff then made his major league debut with the New York Giants to end the 1899 season, his only tenure of major league play.

After playing briefly with the New York Giants in 1898, John Puhl played for the Bridgeport Orators in 1899, appearing in 19 games and batting a .145 while playing third base. Later in season, Puhl made another brief appearance playing for the New York Giants, playing one game at third base. In 1900, Puhl became ill and he died at the age of 24 of Pulmonary Tubercular Phthisis in Bayonne, New Jersey.

The 1900 Bridgeport Orators continued Connecticut League play in beginning the new century. The 1900 Orators team ended the season with a record of 57–41 to finish in third place under manager Jim O'Rourke. Bridgeport finished 7 1/2 games behind the first place Norwich Witches in the final standings, as no playoffs were held.

The 1901 Bridgeport Orators were the runner-up in the eight–team Class F level Connecticut State League final standings. Tim Murnane continued as league president. Bridgeport compiled a final record of 61–43, playing the season under the direction of returning manager Jim O'Rourke in his seventh season. The Bridgeport Orators finished the season 2.0 games behind the first place Bristol Woodchoppers in the final league standings.

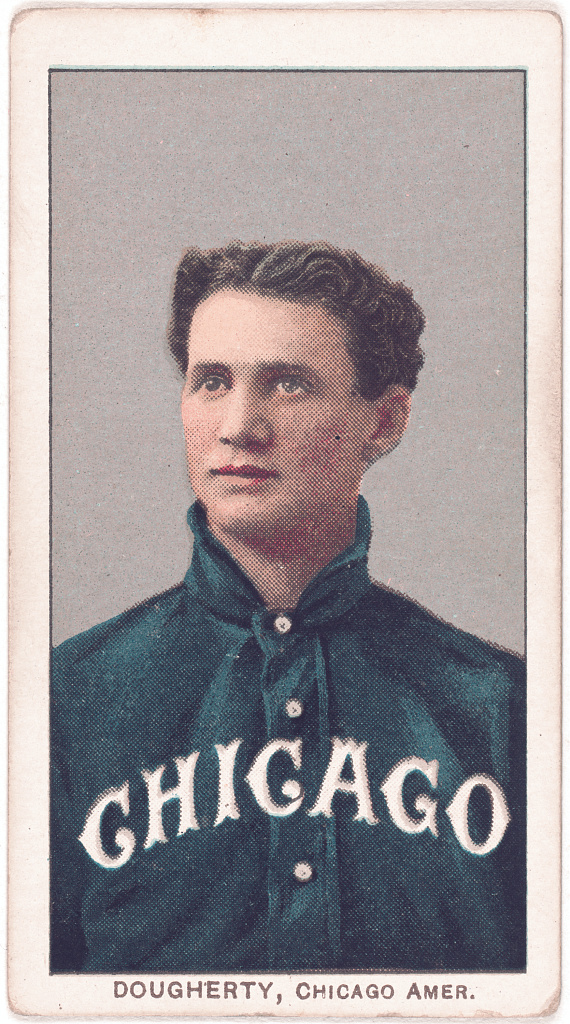
(1909) Patsy Dougherty, Chicago White Sox, baseball card. After making a transition from pitcher to hitter, Dougherty won the 1901 batting title while playing his third season with Bridgeport.

In his third season with Bridgeport, outfielder Patsy Dougherty won the Connecticut State League batting championship in 1901, batting .375 in 107 games at age 24. After his strong season with Bridgeport. Dougherty made his major league debut the next season. In his major league career, Dougherty became the first player to have played for two world series championship teams, the Boston Americans, who won the first World Series in 1903 and the Chicago White Sox, winners of the 1906 World Series. Dougherty hit two home runs in Game 2 of the 1903 World Series, including the first series home run that cleared the fence after leading off the game with an Inside-the-park home run. In his career, Dougherty played with the Boston Americans (1902–1904), New York Highlanders (1904–1906) and Chicago White Sox (1906–1911) during his major league career. Dougherty started with Bridgeport as a pitcher who would play the outfield on occasion when not pitching. Bridgeport eventually transitioned him into a full-time outfielder in his tenure with the team. Dougherty remained a resident of Bridgeport after playing for the Orators.

Prior to the 1902 season, Bridgeport owner/manager Jim O'Rourke helped form the National Association, which became the governing body for all minor league baseball leagues and member teams. There were 14 total minor leagues that played in 1902 with the National Association oversight in place.

Bridgeport Orators continued play in 1902, as the eight–team Connecticut State League became classified as a Class D level league. Both Jim O'Rourke and Sturgis Whitlock served as league presidents during the season. The New Haven Blues won the league championship in the newly elevated league, as the Bridgeport Orators placed fifth. Ending the season with a final record of 53–59, the Bridgeport Orators finished 8 1/2 games behind the champion New Haven team who were managed by Jim Canavan. The Bridgeport Orators were managed by Jim O'Rourke and no league playoffs were held.

At age 43, Jerry Denny returned to play for Bridgeton in his final professional season, batting .195 in 21 games on the 1902 season. Derby had spent the previous four seasons as the player/manager of the Derby Angels franchise. After his playing career ended, Denny remained in Bridgeport, where he became the city inspector. Denny also owned and operated hotels in both Derby and Bridgeport.

The 1903 Bridgeport Orators continued Connecticut State League play as Sturgis Whitlock continued as league president. The Bridgeport Orators ended the season with a record of 59–77 to place third in eight-team Class D level "Connecticut League." Bridgeport ended the season 8 1/2 games behind the first place Holyoke Paperweights in the final standings. After the season, 12 victories of the Holyoke Paperweights were forfeited due to Holyoke using ineligible players, but the team still had enough victories to secure the championship.

In 1903, Jim O'Rourke's son Jimmy O'Rourke joined the Orators team while also attending Yale University. On July 2, 1903, Jimmy O'Rourke began play as he and his father appeared in the lineup for the Bridgeport Orators Connecticut State League game playing at the Springfield Ponies. In doing so the pair becoming the first known father and son tandem to play together in a professional baseball game.

=== 1904: Connecticut State League championship team ===
Following the Connecticut State League controversy in the season prior, Jim O'Rourke again became president of the Connecticut State League in 1904. In his dual role, O'Rourke also managed his Bridgeport Orators team to the league championship. The Orators finished in first place in the 1904 season, ending the season with a record of 71–41. Bridgeport finished 1 1/2 games ahead of the second place Springfield Ponies. An alumnus of Bridgeport High School, outfielder Pop Foster won the league batting title, hitting .376 with 158 hits, most in the league while his teammate and fellow outfielder Roy Clark scored 101 runs, tops in the league.

Roy Clark had played briefly for the New York Giants in 1902 before his first season with Bridgeport in 1903. The 1902 season was his only major league appearance, Of Clark, The Bridgeport Telegram reported: "No man ever played that right field better in this circuit. He now and then threw out at first base on drives supposed to be safe. He had speed, a keen eye, enthusiasm and steady habits and above all, headwork." Following his baseball career, Clark remained in Bridgeport, Connecticut. He worked in the insurance industry, married and raised two sons. Roy Clark died at Bridgeport Hospital in 1925 at age 51 after a brief illness.

At age 54, Jim O'Rourke also made his final major league playing appearance following the completion of the Bridgeport 1903 season. With the New York Giants on the verge of their first pennant since 1889, Giants manager John McGraw signed O'Rourke, the last active member of the 1889 team, to play catcher in the title clinching game. The two were former teammates and friends. With Baseball Hall of Fame pitcher Joe McGinnity pitching, O'Rourke caught the entire game, as the Giants defeated the Cincinnati Reds by the score of 7–5 to win the pennant. In the game, O'Rourke had a single to go 1-for-4 in his final major league game. O'Rourke became the oldest player ever to appear in the National League, and while also becoming the oldest player to hit safely in a major league game. O'Rourke is one of only 29 players in baseball history to appear in a major league game in four different decades.

=== 1905 to 1909: Orators continue in Connecticut State League ===
As the defending Connecticut State League champions, the 1905 Bridgeport Orators placed third in the final standings. The Connecticut State League was reclassified as a higher Class B level League for the 1906 season. The Orators ended the season with a final record of 64–50, led by returning manager Jim O'Rourke. Bridgeton finished 15.0 games behind the first place Holyoke Paperweights in the final standings of the eight-team league.

Bridgeton First baseman Ad Yale led the league with his 96 runs scored for Bridgeton, playing at age 35 in 1905. Yale played eight total seasons for the Bridgeport Orators from 1898 to 1905, and he continued to play professional baseball until he was age 44. Following his successful season with Bridgeton, Yale joined the major league Brooklyn Superbas on September 18, 1905, and played in four games. It was his only career major league exposure. Following the conclusion of his playing career, Yale remained in the city and resided in Bridgeport, Connecticut until his death in 1948.

Before the 1906 season, Jim. O'Rourke, again serving as the Connecticut League president, announced that the league's $1,800 salary cap would be "strictly enforced." O'Rourke himself became the primary catcher for the Orators that season, playing regularly at age 57. Playing with their catcher/manager, the 1906 Bridgeport Orators placed seventh in the eight-team Connecticut State League final standings. The Orators ended the season with a record of 54–72 as no league playoffs were held. Bridgeport finished 18 1/2 games the behind the league champion Norwich Reds. Bridgeport outfielder Hi Ladd led the league with 157 total hits.

In the 1907 season, Jim O'Rourke was replaced by W.J. Tracy as the Connecticut State League president. The Bridgeport Orators ended the 1907 eight-team Connecticut State League season with a record of 49–75 as the Orators finished in sixth place, playing the season under O'Rourke, who remained in his role as Bridgeport's owner and manager, still playing occasionally at age 58. No playoff was held, as the Orators team ended the Connecticut State League season 31.0 games behind the first place Holyoke Papermakers in the eight-team league. Despite playing on the sixth-place team, Hi Ladd continued his ten-year tenure with Bridgeton and won the league batting title, hitting .341 with a league leading 168 hits.

The Bridgeport Orators continued minor league play in the 1908 eight–team Class B level Connecticut State League, ending the season in sixth place. The Orators had a final record of 55–71, playing the season under the direction of manager Jim O'Rourke in his next to last season as manager. No playoffs were held, as the Bridgeton the Connecticut State League season 29 1/2 games behind the first place Springfield Ponies in the final league standings. Bridgeport pitcher John "Red" Waller won a league leading 23 games. Waller had a noteworthy tenure while pitching four seasons in Bridgeport.

At age 33, left-handed pitcher Jerry Nopes played his final professional season for Bridgeport in 1908. Nopes had a 4–7 in 11 games with the Orators. Nopes had pitched in the major leagues for the Philadelphia Phillies (1896), Baltimore Orioles (NL) (1896–1899), Brooklyn Superbas (1900) and Baltimore Orioles (AL) (1901) and had a 72–41 record and a 3.70 ERA. Nopes owned a saloon in Baltimore and had a tumultuous few years in his personal life following his major league career, as he was arrested on multiple occasions with court cases and jail time resulting. As Nopes aged, he remained in the saloon business and he ultimately ran a bar in Camden, New Jersey.

Jim O'Rourke again became president of the eight-team Connecticut State League in 1909 and also served his final season as the owner and manager of his Bridgeport Orators team. In O'Rourke's final season as manager, his Bridgeport Orators ended the 1909 Connecticut State League season in last place. With a record of 44–78, the team finished in eighth place. No playoffs were held as Bridgeport finished 32.0 games behind the first place Hartford Senators in the final standings of the eight-team, Class B level league.

=== 1910 to 1912: Final Connecticut State League seasons ===
In January 1910, Jim O'Rourke sold the Bridgeport Orators franchise that he had owned since 1895. The Bridgeport team was purchased from O'Rourke by Gene McCann, a friend and colleague of O'Rourke. In 1910, O'Rourke's wife of 38 years, Ann died as did his brother John O'Rourke. The new team owner and manager, Gene McCann had been the manager of the Jersey City Skeeters of the Eastern League the prior two seasons. As a player, McCann had pitched briefly in the major leagues with the Brooklyn Superbas in 1901 and 1902.

The 1910 Bridgeport Orators continued play as members of the eight–team Class B level Connecticut State League, as W.J. Tracy became the league president. The Bridgeport Orators finished with an overall record of 67–52 and in a close second place, playing the season under their new owner and manager Gene McCann, who began a three-season tenure with the team. No playoffs were held and in a close race, the Bridgeport Orators ended the season just 1 1/2 games behind the first place Waterbury Finnegans in the final standings. Bridgeport outfielder Hi Ladd led the league with 158 hits. Orators pitcher Red Waller had 21 wins to lead the league, notching his third 20-win season pitching for Bridgeton. Waller made his major league debut with the New York Giants after the Connecticut League season ended, his only major league appearance. Waller died in 1913 at age 31 after a long illness.

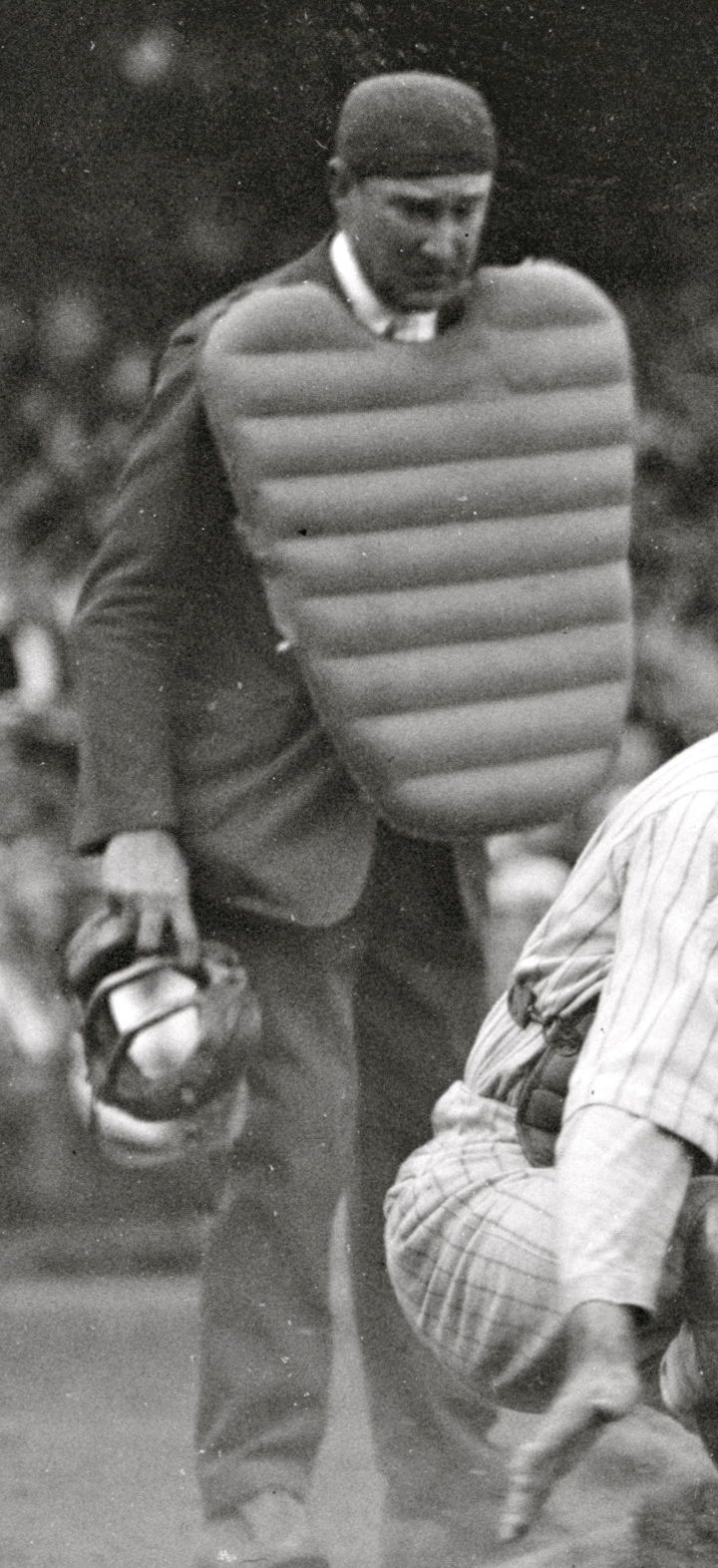
(1925) Dick Nallin. Nallin played his final professional season for Bridgeport in 1910. He later served as a major league umpire from 1915 to 1932.

Outfielder Dick Nallin batted .226 while appearing in 45 games for Bridgeport in 1910. It was the final playing season for Nallin, at age 33. Nallin had previously been the collegiate football player/coach of the 1899 Villanova Wildcats football team. Nallin also played collegiate baseball at Villanova. Following the end of his baseball playing career after his season with Bridgeport, he became an umpire. Nallin was a Major League Baseball umpire from 1915 to 1932 in the American League. In his career he umpired in the 1927 World Series and 1931 World Series. He was home plate umpire for three no-hitters with two on back-to-back days in 1917 and Charlie Robertson's perfect game on April 30, 1922. On September 11, 1928, Nallin was the home-plate umpire during Ty Cobb's final game.

Although he no longer owned the Bridgeton team, in 1911 Jim O'Rourke again became president of the Connecticut State League. The league began the season as an eight-team league, and ended as a six-team league with Bridgeport continuing play. During the season, both the Northampton Meadowlarks and Holyoke Papermakers teams folded on June 26, 1911. For the second consecutive season Bridgeport finished a close second place in the final standings. 71–47 record just 1.0 game behind first place Springfield Ponies (71–45) Gene McCann and Robert Tracey served as the managers as no playoffs were held. Hi Ladd led the league in hits for the second consecutive season, with 143 Total hits. Pitcher Curt Walker led the Connecticut State League with a 15–5 record for a .750 winning percentage while playing for both Holyoke and Bridgeton during the season.

Left-handed hitter Benny Kauff played centerfield for Bridgeport in 1911, batting .294 in 116 games for the Orators at age 21. The New York Highlanders had invited Kauff to spring training in 1911 before optioning him to Bridgeport. After his season with the Orators, Kauff went on to make his major league debut the next season. Kauff played on the major leagues for the New York Highlanders (1912), Indianapolis Hoosiers (1914), Brooklyn Tip-Tops (1915) and New York Giants (1916–1920) winning two Federal League batting championships and compiling a .311 lifetime batting average and .389 OBP. In January 1921, Baseball Commissioner Judge Kenesaw Mountain Landis suspended Kauff from playing baseball until an auto theft case against him and his brother was completed. Kauff was acquitted in the auto theft case in May 1921, but Landis refused to reinstate him due to concerns about his character. Kauff's legal appeals for reinstatement advanced to the New York State Supreme Court but were unsuccessful. Kauff was allowed to serve as a baseball scout and spent 22 years scouting after his playing career was ended.

With Jim O'Rourke returning as president, the 1912 Connecticut State League played as a six-team league. With a record of 61–55, the Bridgeport Ortors played under manager Gene McCann and ended the season in third place. Bridgeport finished 14 1/2 games behind the league champion New Haven Murlins.

Outfielder Frank O'Rourke played for Bridgeton at age 20, batting .354 while appearing in 29 games in 1912. O'Rourke was playing for a steel mill team in Pennsylvania when he was signed by Gene McCann to join the Bridgeport team. after his strong start in Bridgeport, scout James Gaffney of the Boston Braves purchased his contract from Bridgeport on June 7, 1912. Frank O'Rourke made his major league debut with the Boston Braves following his play with Bridgeton. Frank O'Rourke went on to play in the major leagues with the Boston Braves (1912), Brooklyn Robins (1917–1918), Washington Senators (1920–1921), Boston Red Sox (1922), Detroit Tigers (1924–1925) and St. Louis Browns (1927–1931). O'Rourke batted .254 in 1,131 career major league games. He later served as a minor league manager with the El Dorado Lions and other teams and he began a lengthy career as a scout, scouring first for the Cincinnati Reds and then with the New York Yankees from 1952 to 1985 when he died at age 91.

In the 1912 season, league president Jim O'Rourke suited up and played catcher for a complete minor league game at the age of 60. Jim O'Rourke played one game for the New Haven White Wings on September 14, 1912.

The Connecticut State League did not return to play in the 1913 season and permanently folded. Bridgeport joined another league that was expanding.

=== 1913 & 1914: Eastern Association ===
With Jim O'Brien serving as the league president, Bridgeport became members of the Eastern Association in 1913 when the league expanded from six teams to eight teams, adding Bridgeport and a Pittsfield team. The Bridgeport "Crossmen" joined the Hartford Senators, Holyoke Papermakers, New Haven White Wings, New London Planters, Pittsfield Electrics, Springfield Ponies, Waterbury Contenders teams in the league. The Eastern Association began the season schedule on April 23, 1913.

Gene McCann left the Bridgeport team as owner and manager following a disagreement with the Bridgeport team president during the 1913 season. Playing in the Class D level league, Bridgeton had a final record of 69–63. The Crossmen finished in fourth place, playing the season under managers Gene McCann in his final season, Buck Freeman and Monte Cross. Bridgeport finished 14 1/2 games behind the first place Hartford team in the final league standings.

McCann's replacement as manager, Buck Freeman joined the team at age 41, having managed the Scranton Miners during the previous 1912 season. Freeman is a member of the Boston Red Sox Hall of Fame. As a firstbaseman/outielder, Buck Freeman had played 11 seasons in the major leagues with the Washington Senators 1891, 1898–1899), Boston Beaneaters (1900) and Boston Americans (1901–1907). Through 1905, Freeman had played 541 consecutive games and 5,431 consecutive innings, until sitting out a game. The innings record which would stand until 1985, when it was broken by Cal Ripken Jr.. Freeman hit 25 home runs for the 1899 Washing Senators, which was a remarkable feat in the era. No one hit more home runs in a season until Babe Ruth in 1919. Freeman lifted weights, walked 12-miles per day and exercised regularly, which was a rarity and was frowned upon in the era in which he played. Following his tenure with Bridgeport, Freeman became an umpire beginning in 1913. He worked in the minor leagues and also in the 1924 Negro League World Series. He retired from umpiring and served as a scout for the St. Louis Browns from 1926 until 1933.

A former shortstop, manager Monte Cross joined Bridgeton at age 43. Cross had played in the major leagues with the Baltimore Orioles (1892–1893), Pittsburgh Pirates (1894–1895), St. Louis Browns (NL) (1896), Philadelphia Phillies (1897–1901) and Philadelphia Athletics (1902–1907). He batted .231 in his career. Cross later coached collegiate for the Maine Black Bears baseball team from 1916 to 1921.

Former major league pitcher Jake Boultes became the Bridgeport Crossmen manager in 1914. Boutles had played third base for Bridgeport in 1913, batting .266 with 3 home runs in 134 games and then became the player/manager for the 1914 season at age 29. A right handed pitcher, Boultes had previously pitched major leagues with the Boston Doves from 1907 to 1909 and compiling a 2.96 ERA and 8–14 record with Boston in his only major league service.

In the 1914 season, the Eastern Association continued play with Bridgeton as a member as the Class B level league, whose president was James O'Rourke. The Bridgeton Crossmen completed the season with a record of 67–56, finishing in third place manager under manager Jake Boultes. Bridgeport finished 17 1/2 games behind first place New London Planters. As the starting third baseman, Jake Boutles played in 123 games for Bridgeport, batting .254 with 25 stolen bases and 27 sacrifice hits.

Bridgeport did not play in the 1915 season due to World War I, as the Eastern Association paused play. There were 44 total minor leagues that played in the 1914 season and that number was reduced to 32 in 1915 and to 26 in the 1916 season.

=== 1916: Eastern League / Billy Lush owner ===
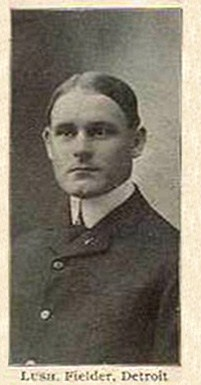
(1903) Billy Lush, Detroit Tigers. A Bridgeport native, Lush played for Bridgeport in 1895 and purchased a majority share of the franchise in July 1916.

After a one-season hiatus, Bridgeport returned to minor league play in 1916. The Bridgeport "Hustlers" became members of the eight-team Class A level Eastern League, which was reformed by president Tim Murnane. Murnane had been president of the 1915 New England League, and five teams from that league continued play in the Eastern League. With his new league, Murnane had gained control of minor league baseball in the region as Jim O'Rourke essentially withdrew from baseball in 1916. The two men had been long time friends after playing together on the Stratford Osceola's youth team as teenagers.

In 1916, Bridgeport partnered with the Hartford Senators, Lawrence Barristers, Lowell Grays, Lynn Pipers, New Haven Murlins, New London Planters, Portland Duffs, Springfield Ponies and Worcester Boosters teams in forming the Eastern League. The Lawrence, Lowell, Lynn, Portland and, Worcester franchises were previously members of the eight-team 1915 New England league, before the five teams continued play in the new league in 1916. The Portland Duffs had won the championship in 1915 under manager Hugh Duffy, who was inducted into the Baseball Hall of Fame.

A Bridgeport resident, former major league player Neal Ball became the Bridgeport manager during the 1916 season in his first managerial role at age 35. In May 1916, Ball was acquired from the Toronto Maple Leafs to move to Bridgeport and become the Hustlers' manager and second baseman. In July, the Hustlers were in last place and, as a result, he was dismissed from the team. Neil Ball had played with Babe Ruth with the 1914 Baltimore Orioles and the two became good friends. Ball played mainly shortstop in his major league career with the New York Highlanders (1907–1909), Cleveland Naps (1909–1912) and Boston Red Sox (1912–1913), batting .250 with 4 career home runs and 99 stolen bases in 502 games. He also had career 216 errors in 477 games while playing the field. Ball made the first unassisted triple play in major league history in 1909. Ball remained a resident of Bridgeport until his death in 1957 and often traveled to New York to watch major league games, using a lifetime pass given to him by the National League.

Coinciding with Ball's dismissal as the Bridgeport manager, in July 1916, Bridgeport native and former major league player Billy Lush purchased a fifty percent interest the Bridgeport team. He announced at the time that of the purchase that he would serve as the team's manager. He ultimately did not manage the team as Mike Healy replaced Neil Ball as manager,

Bridgeport Hustlers ended the season in seventh place in 1916. In their return to play after a one-year hiatus, Bridgeport ended the season with a 44–78 record. Playing the season under managers Neal Ball and Mike Healy, the Hustlers finished 43 1/2 behind the first place New London Planers. Lawrence and Lowell both folded on September 5, 1916.

=== 1917 to 1923: Bridgeport Americans / continue Eastern League ===
The Bridgeport "Americans" continued Eastern League play in 1917. There were only 21 minor leagues playing during season due to World War I. The league played as an eight-team Class A level league, and Daniel O'Neill began a tenure as league president with Jim O'Rourke having left the position. Bridgeport ended the season with a 50–52 record, finishing in fourth place under manager Paul Krichell. The Americans ended the season 16 1/2 games behind first place New Haven Planters.

Paul Krichell began a two-year tenure as the Bridgeport manager, who had been a backup catcher for the St. Louis Browns in (1911 and 1912). After he left St. Louis he played in the minor leagues and he worked in the shipyards during World War I. Krichell owned and operated a saloon in the Bronx that was popular with players. Prohibition forced Krichell to close the saloon and return to baseball and join Bridgeport in the process.

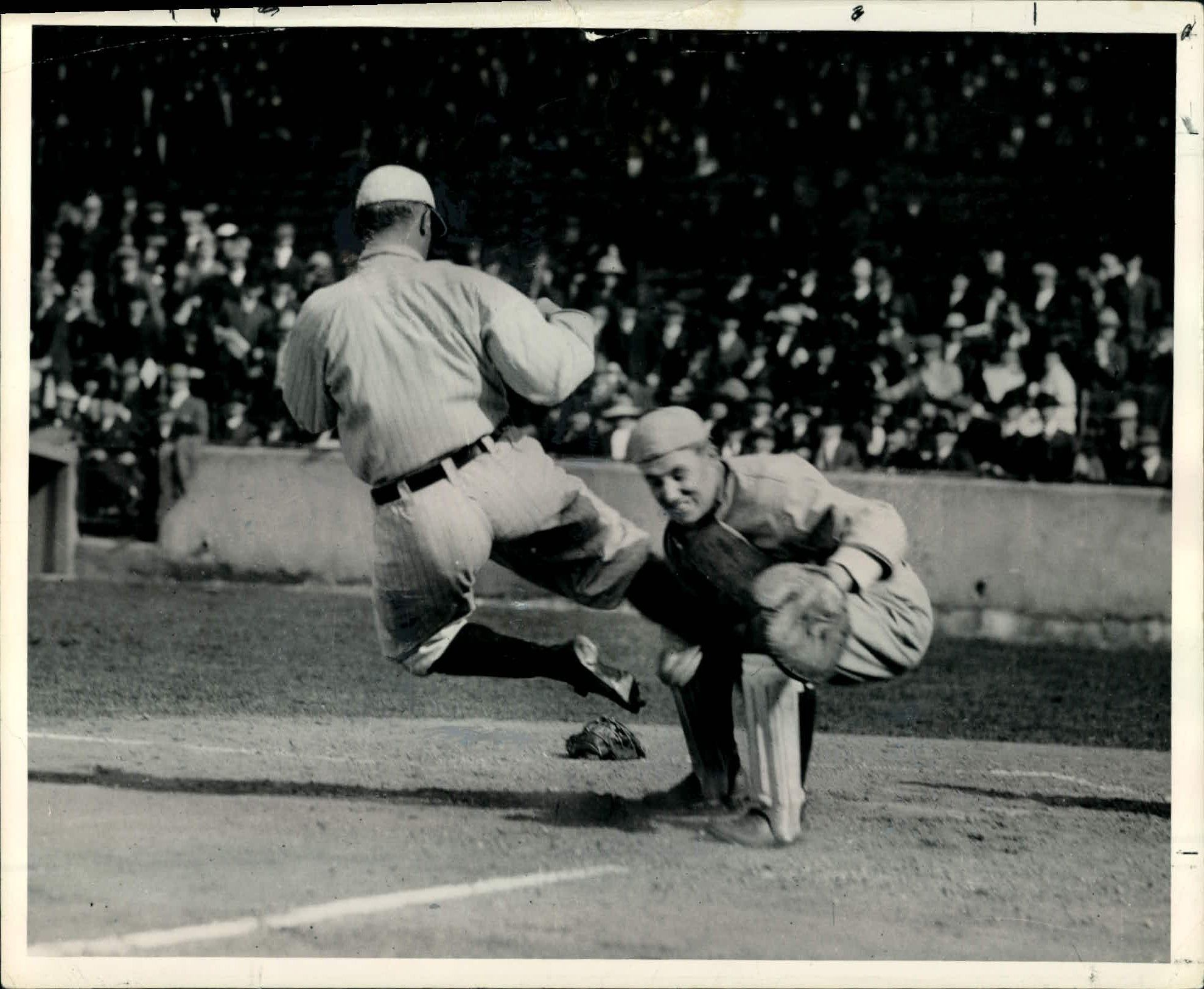
(1912) Ty Cobb, Detroit Tigers and Paul Krichell, St. Louis Browns in a play at home plate. Krichell was injured on the play and never returned to the major leagues. Krichell managed Bridgeport in 1917 and 1918. He became a New York Yankees scout and signed Lou Gehrig and several other Hall of Fame players.

After his managerial tenure with Bridgeport, Paul Krichell coached the New York University baseball team in 1919. After the collegiate season concluded, he become a coach and scout for the Boston Red Sox. He began scouting for the New York Yankees in 1920. While scouting for the Yankees in 1923, Krichell attended a game between Columbia University and Rutgers University, Krichell shared a train to the ballpark with Columbia manager, Andy Coakley. They discussed Baseball Hall of Fame member, the legendary Lou Gehrig, who was a left-handed pitcher for Coakley at Columbia. That day, Gehrig hit two home runs. Krichell was at Columbia's next game against New York University. Gehrig hit a long home run in that game. After the game, Krichell signed Gehrig to a contract with the New York Yankees for $2,000, with a $1,500 bonus. Krichell also persuaded Gehrig to give up pitching to focus on being a hitter. In his role as a Yankees scout, Krichel also signed Hall of Famers Leo Durocher (for a $7,500 bonus), Tony Lazzeri, Phil Rizzuto and Whitey Ford.

On April 28, 1918, Bridgeport hosted the Boston Red Sox in an exhibition game held at Newfield Park in Bridgeport. The Red Sox defeated Bridgeport 7–0 in the exhibition game with Boston pitcher Sam Jones defeating Bridgeport in the contest. Babe Ruth was a pitcher and outfielder on the 1918 Boston team. The 1918 Boston team went on to win the 1918 World Series that season, defeating the Chicago Cubs.

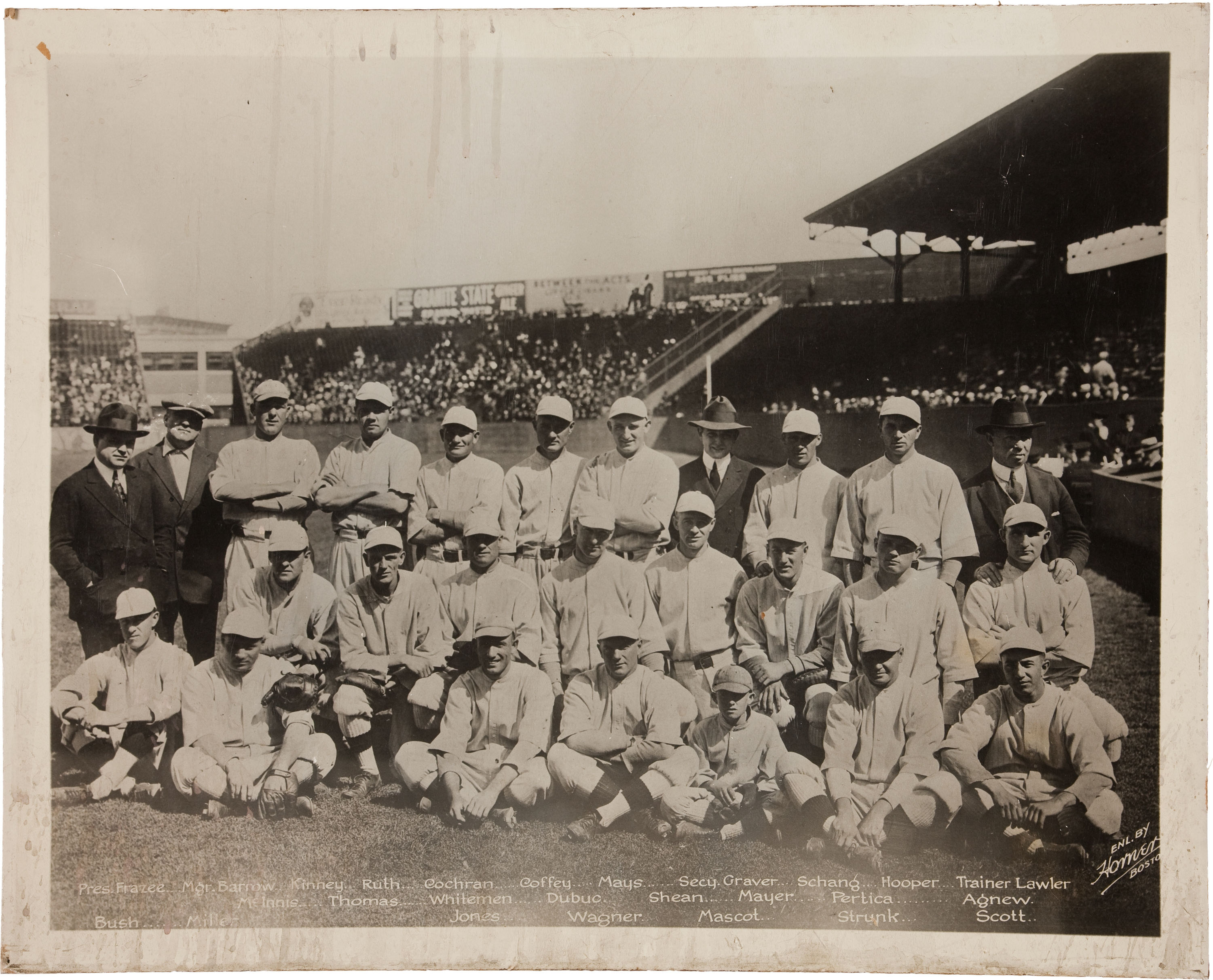
The 1918 Boston Red Sox team at Fenway Park. Babe Ruth is in the back row. Boston played an exhibition game at Bridgeport in April 1918, winning 7–0. Boston won the 1918 World Series that season.

In the 1918 season, only nine minor leagues were playing and only one minor league completed its season, the International League. Class B level. The league stopped play on July 22, 1918. 44–12 second place manager Paul Krichell and Ray Grimes, runner up when the league folded on July 22. Ray Grimes had become the manager when Kritchell resigned on June 27, 1918. Krichell resigned on June 27, 1918, after two wins were forfeited when he used a player not under contract. He worked in the shipyards during the First World War. During the offseason, Krichell became the owner of a saloon popular with players in the Bronx, before Prohibition forced Krichell to close and return to baseball. For the 1919 season, he coached the New York University baseball team and after the season ended, he signed with Ed Barrow to become a coach and scout for the Boston Red Sox in the following season.

With a record of 44–12, the 1918 Bridgeport Americans were in second place, just 1.0 game behind first place New London when the league folded on July 22. 1918. Paul Kitchell and Ray Grimes managed Bridgeport.

In his second season with Bridgeport, pitcher Alex Ferguson led the league with both 19 wins and 102 strikeouts in the shortened season. Ferguson went on to make his major league debut with the New York Yankees at the end of the 1918 season. Ferguson pitched in the major leagues with the New York Yankees (1918, 1921), Boston Red Sox (1922–1925), New York Yankees (1925), Washington Senators (1925–1926), Philadelphia Phillies (1927–1929) and Brooklyn Robins (1929), winning 65 career games.

For the 1919 season the Grimes twins switched managerial roles for the Bridgeport Americans, as Roy Grimes became the player/manager, having joined the team for the 1919 season.

The Bridgeport Americans continued play in the 1919 Eastern League, one of fifteen minor leagues that played that season. Playing in the Class A level league, MLB Stats, Scores, History, & Records Americans ended the season with a record of 59–47, led by player/manager Roy Grimes, who took the helm of the team at age 25. Bridgeport ended the season in fourth place but finished only 4.0 games behind the first place Pittsfield Hillies. Roy Grimes' twin brother, Ray Grimes, who split the season between last place Hartford and Bridgeport led the league with 127 total hits and a .364 average.

Following his four-season tenure with Bridgeport, first baseman Ray Grimes made his major league debut in 1920. Ray Grimes was a career .329 hitter in the major leagues playing with the Boston Red Sox (1920), Chicago Cubs (1921–1924) and Philadelphia Phillies (1926). From June 27 through July 23, 1922, Grimes set a major league record by playing 17 consecutive games with an RBI. Grimes suffered a slipped disc in 1923 while sliding. The injury required surgery and effectively ended his major league career.

Outfielder John Blake returned to Bridgeport for the 1919 season having previously played for the 1916 team. A military veteran, Blake went on to become a collegiate athletics coach and a professor after his 1919season with Bridgeport. Having served in the United States Army during World War I. After his discharge from the military, Blake returned to his alumni Niagara University in the fall of 1919, where he served a tenure as the football, baseball, and basketball coach at the school. His Niagara baseball teams compiled an 86–14 record in his tenure. The 1921–22 Niagara Purple Eagles men's basketball team finished with a 27–4 record on the season. In June 1923 he left coaching and served at Niagara as a mathematics professor. In 1924, he left Niagara for a professor position at St. John's University. Blake later returned to coaching, working in 1933 as an assistant basketball coach at Fordham.

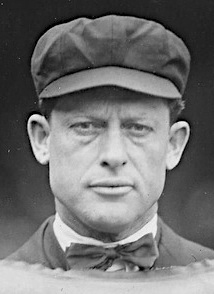
(1922) Baseball Hall of Fame member Ed Walsh. Walsh managed Bridgeport for the 1920 season and pitched briefly for the Americans.

Bridgeport Americans had a Baseball Hall of Fame member as their manager in 1920. as Ed Walsh joined the organization in his first full managerial role, hired in January 1920. Walsh was returning to baseball after his playing career had ended following the 1917 season. Walsh had just served in World War I working in a munitions factory prior to joining Bridgeport. In his major league career, with the Chicago White Sox (1904–1916) and Boston Braves (1917), Walsh retired with a 1.82 ERA, the lowest career ERA in MLB history. Walsh won 195 career games including 40 wins in the 1908 season alone, when he threw 464 innings. Walsh threw four complete games in the 1912 postseason Chicago City Series and had lengthy relief outings in two other games in leading his White Sox over the Chicago Cubs in the series. He never pitched as dominantly again as his pitching results were still satisfactory but curtailed drastically from his prior dominant seasons. Arm injuries shortened Walsh's pitching career.

The Bridgeport Americans ended their 1920 season placing fifth in the final standings, but during the season they were ahead of the league champion New Haven Weissmen several times in the standings before fading. Bridgeport finished with a 70–70 record and were managed by Big Ed Walsh for the entire season. The Americans ended the season in fifth place, finishing 9.0 games behind first place New Haven in the final standings of the eight-team league. Ray Grimes returned to Bridgeport and won the league batting title, hitting .364, while his brother Roy batted .374 in a part time play for Bridgeton. Baseball Hall of Fame member Chief Bender led New Haven to the title with a league leading 25 wins and 252 strikeouts on the season. Manager Ed Walsh pitched in three games for the Americans at age 39, throwing 22 innings with a 1–1 record and 3.27 ERA in the final pitching appearances of his career.

Both Grimes twin brothers and former managers returned to Bridgeton as players in 1920 to play under Ed Walsh. Both brothers ended the season making their debuts in the major leagues. Ray Grimes batted .354 while playing in 119 games for Bridgeport in 1920. Ray then made his major league debut with the Boston Red Sox to end the season. Playing shortstop, Roy Grimes also returned to Bridgeport and batted .374 in 53 games before leaving the team to make his major league debut with the New York Giants, his only major league appearances.

Following his 1920 season with Bridgeport, Ed Walsh did not return to the team in 1921. He helped with a semipro baseball team in Oneonta, New York in 1921 and then became a major league umpire for the American League beginning with the 1922 season. Walsh grew to dislike umpiring because he did not enjoy being the home plate umpire and calling strikes. Walsh then served as a coach bench for the Chicago White Sox for several years. He coached at collegiately for the Notre Dame Fighting Irish, when his sons Ed Walsh, Jr. and Bob Walsh were student-athletes. Walsh settled in nearby Meriden, Connecticut, where he conducted a baseball school through the Works Progress Administration's recreational program. He then became a chemical engineer and worked at the water filtration plant in Meriden. Walsh also became the golf course professional in Meriden.

After leaving following the 1913 season in his prior tenure as the owner/manager of the Bridgeport team, Gene McCann returned as the Bridgeport manager for the 1921 season. The Americans ended the Eastern League season in third place in the eight-team league with an 85–66 record. Bridgeport ended the season 12.0 games behind the first place Pittsfield Hillies. Bridgeport pitcher Herman Bornheoft led the Eastern League with a 1.73 ERA.

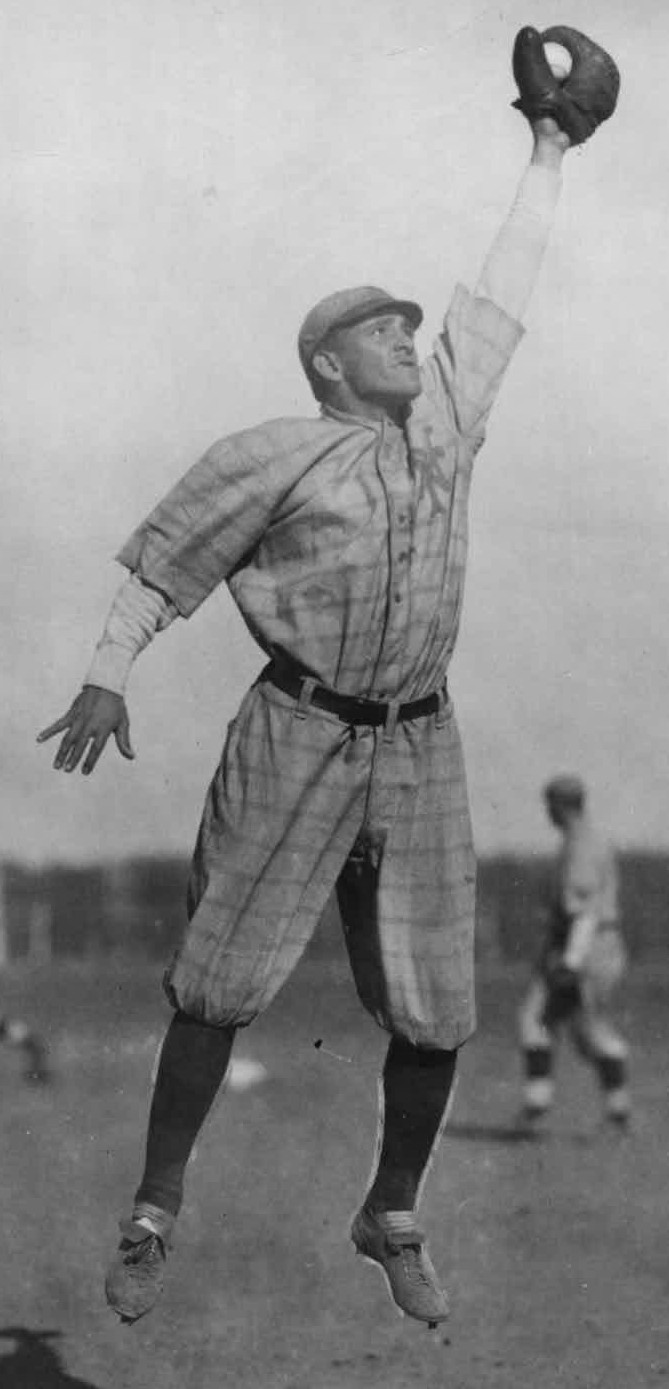
(1916) José Rodríguez, New York Giants. Rodríguez played seven full seasons with Bridgeton beginning in 1921, never batting below .290.

A member of the Cuban Baseball Hall of Fame, infielder José Rodríguez played for Bridgeton in 1921 at age 27. While playing first base, Rodríguez batted .296 with 5 home runs in 151 games to begin a notable tenure with Bridgeton. Prior to joining Bridgeport, Rodríguez had previously played in the major leagues with the New York Giants from 1916 to 1918, with brief appearances each season, batting .166 in 145 total career at bats. With his 1921 season Rodríguez played in seven total seasons with Bridgeport (1921–1925; 1928–1929) and batting over .290 each season with the team. Rodríguez also played in the Cuban League in the winter months, serving as a player/manager for Almendares. In the winter of 1924/25, he won the player/manager of the Almendares championship that won the Cuban League. On his team roster were Negro league players of the era, with five future members of the U.S. Baseball Hall of Fame—Bullet Rogan, Andy Cooper, John Henry ("Pop") Lloyd, Biz Mackey, and Oscar Charleston on the team as well as Dick Lundy, Newt Allen, Valentín Dreke, Dolf Luque and José Acosta.

At age 30, Joe Boehling pitched to a 6–6 record with a 2.02 ERA for Bridgeton in 1921, having begun the season with the Toronto Maple Leafs. It was the final season of his professional career. Boehling had pitched in the major leagues with the and had a 2.97 career ERA.

The Bridgeport Americans ended the 1922 Eastern League season placing third in the eight-team league. Bridgeport had a record of 78–73 under Gene McCann, The Americans finished 22.0 games behind the first place New Haven Indians who won 100 games on the season(100–51). Bridgeport pitcher Robert Vines compiled a league leading 1.65 ERA on the season.

Continuing Eastern League membership, the Bridgeport Americans placed fifth in the 1923 league. The Americans had a final record of 71–81 record, playing the season under managers Gene McCann and Fred Fisher, while finishing 26 1/2 games behind the first place Hartford Senators.

Sent to the Eastern League to work on his fielding, Lou Gehrig played for Bridgeton's rival Hartford for part of the 1923 season before embarking on his rookie year with the New York Yankees. At age 20, Gehrig batted .304 with 24 home runs in 59 Eastern League games for Hartford before his promotion. Gehrig joined the Yankees from Hartford and began play for New York on June 15, 1923.

Gene McCann managed Bridgeport for the final time in the 1923 season, his fifth season managing the Americans. After leaving Bridgeport, McCann became the manager of the Springfield in 1924 and later became a scout for the New York Yankees.

=== 1924 to 1931: Bridgeport Bears / Eastern League ===
The team became known as the Bridgeport "Bears" while continuing Eastern League play in 1924. The Bears had a rough season finishing in last place in the eight-team league. The Bears ended the season with a record of 65–88 record, with managers John O'Hara, Joe Smith, Art Butler (1–3) and Dick Hoblitzel (25–33) serving in the role during the season. Bridgeport finished 24 1/2 games behind the champion Waterbury Brasscos in the final standings.

A first baseman, Dick Hoblitzell joined Bridgeport from the Reading Keystones, having batted .338 for Reading at age 35. Hoblitzell had played in the major leagues with the Cincinnati Reds (1908–1914) and Boston Red Sox (1914–1918), becoming a two-time World Series champion (1915, 1916) with Boston. Hoblitzell batted .299 in 34 games playing for Bridgeport.

Hoping to overcome their last place season, the year prior, the Bridgeport Bears hired former major league manager Kaiser Wilhelm to become the Bridgeport manager in 1925 at age 48. Wilhelm had spent the previous two seasons as a pitching coach and scout for the Rochester Tribe in the International League. Wilhelm had managed the Philadelphia Phillies in 1921 and 1922, as the Phillies were in the midst of a 14-season streak without a winning record. He was fired from the position after the 1922 Phillies finished the season in seventh place with a 57–96 record. Wilhelm had a long major league career as a pitcher, playing for the Pittsburgh Pirates (1903), Boston Beaneaters (1904–1905), Brooklyn Superbas (1908–1910) and Baltimore Terrapins (1914–1915) with a brief appearance for the 1921 Phillies. Wilhelm had a career record of 56–105, with a 3.44 ERA.

Led by Wilhelm, the Bridgeport Bears improved slightly in 1925, finishing in sixth place in the eight-team Eastern League. Compiling their 76–78 record under manager Kaiser Wilhelm, the Beras finished 12/o games behind the first place Waterbury Brasscos in the final standings. Pitcher Bunn Hearne had 160 strikeouts to lead the league. After his season as the Bridgeport manager, Kaiser Wilhelm remained in baseball, working with youth and serving stints with the Montreal Royals, Syracuse Stars and Hazleton Mountaineers before his death in 1936.

The Bridgeport Bears continued Eastern League play in the 1926 season, as Daniel O'Neill was replaced during the season by Herman Weisman as league president. The Bears ended the season in third place, despite a stellar record of 91–63. Playing under manager Bud Stapleton, the Bears finished 7.0 games behind first place Providence Rubes (97–55) who relocated from Worcester during the season. The Rubes were managed by their namesake, Baseball Hall of Fame member Rube Marquard. Bridgeport left-handed outfielder Harold Yordy hit 18 home runs to lead the Eastern League, while batting .304 in 154 games. Player/manager Bud Stapleton was a native of Bridgeport who had played the previous four seasons in the Eastern League with the Pittsfield Hillies. He played first base and batted .284 with 1 home run in 148 games for the Bears at age 26.

Pitching for Bridgeport at age 36, Johnny Enzmann had a 17–8 record and a 3.33 ERA on the season. Enzmann had pitched in the majors with the Brooklyn Robins (1914), Cleveland Indians (1918–1919) and Philadelphia Phillies (1920) and had a career ERA of 2.84 with an 11–12 record with 2 saves in 67 career appearances.

On August 10, 1927, Bridgeport pitcher Jack Warhop pitched complete games and won both games of a doubleheader at age 42. Warhop defeated the Albany Lawmakers 5–3 in the first game and then asking to pitch in the second game. He pitched a 10-inning shutout in the second game winning 1–0. A week prior Bridgeport's Andy Rush also pulled off the feat in defeating New Haven 3-0 and 4–3 in a doubleheader. Earlier in the season, Warhop had pitched 14 innings against Hartford in an 18-inning game and was disappointed in being taken out of the game.

The Bridgeport Bears Eastern League membership continued in 1927 as Herman Weisman continued his tenure as league president. Playing in the eight-team, Class A level league, the Bears finished the season placing fourth. Bridgeport ended the season with a record of 84–70, playing under returning manager Bud Stapleton, as Bridgeton finished just 4 1/2 games behind first place Albany Senators (88–65) in the final standings. Bridgeport pitcher Andy Rush led the Eastern League with a 1.57 ERA on the season, pitching for the Bears at age 37. Player/manager Bud Stapleton again played first base for Bridgeport and batted .337 with 5 home runs in 112 games on the season.

Shortstop Dick Bartell played for Bridgeport in his only minor league season in 1927, hitting .280 in 148 games for the Bears at age 19. Bartell ended the 1927 season making his major league debut with the Pittsburgh Pirates, beginning an 18-season major league career.

The Bridgeport Bears had an oddity in the 1928 Eastern League standings, as the team finished in seventh place in the eight-team league with a record that was above .500. The Bears ended the season with a 77–76 record managed by Bud Stapleton, and his replacements Billy Whitman and Bob Emmerich and finished 15.0 games behind first place New Haven Profs. The seventh place Bridgeport Bears actually finished 42 1/2 games ahead of the next team in the standings, the eighth place Waterbury Brasscos who ended the season with a 34–118 record.

Playing first base, José Rodríguez returned to play for Bridgeton in 1928 at age 34, batting .316 in 140 games.

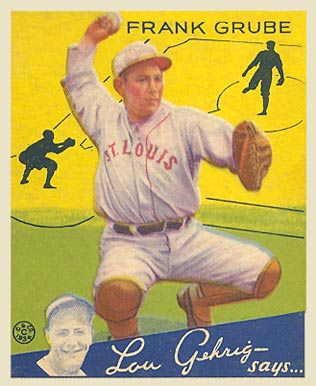
(1934) Frank Grube, St. Louis Browns, baseball card. Grube batted .303 as the catcher for Bridgeport in 1929. Grube played in the National Football League with the New York Yankees (NFL) in the fall of 1928.

The Bridgeport Bears were the runner-up in the eight-team Eastern League in 1929. Bridgeport ended the season with a record of 91–63 as Hans Lobert began a three-season tenure as manager, all resulting in runner up finishes. The Bears ended up 6.0 games behind the first place Albany Senators in the final standings. Bridgeport infielder Wally Kimmick won the batting title, hitting .376 on the season. Andy Rush split the season between the Allentown Dukes and Bridgeport led the league with 23 wins. Kimmick accumulated 345 major league at-bats playing for the St. Louis Cardinals (1919), Cincinnati Reds (1921–1923) and Philadelphia Phillies (1925–1926). Kimmick batted .261 with 1 home run in 163 major league games.

Bridgeport manager Hans Lobert was later a subject in the 1953 film Big Leaguer and the 1966 Lawrence Ritter book The Glory of Their Times. Lobert had played in the major leagues as an infielder with the Pittsburgh Pirates (1903), Chicago Cubs (1905), Cincinnati Reds 1906–1910), Philadelphia Phillies (1911–1914) and New York Giants (1915–1917). Following his three-season tenure as manager with Bridgeport, Lobert became a coach with the Philadelphia Phillies in 1934 and managing the Phillies in (1938, 1942). He coached in the majors through the 1944 season and served as a major league scout until his death in 1968 at age 86.

Lefthanded hitting Buck Jordan played first base for Bridgeton in 1929 and had a memorable season, hitting .354 with 36 doubles, 11 triples and 1 home run in 96 games for the Orators. Jordan joined the New York Giants to end the 1929 season after his strong season with Bridgeton concluded. Jordan played ten-seasons in the major leagues, appearing with the New York Giants (1927, 1929), Washington Senators (1931), Boston Braves (1932–1937), Cincinnati Reds (1937–1938) and Philadelphia Phillies (1938). In his career, Jordan was a .299 hitter with 17 home runs and 281 RBI in 811 major league games played.

Catcher Frank Grube batted .303 for the Bears in 1929, playing in 103 games at age 24. A versatile athlete Grube had played in the National Football League in the fall of 1928 appearing in 11 games before joining Bridgeton that spring. Grube played left end for the New York football Yankees in his lone NFL season. Following his season with Bridgeport Grube played in the major leagues with the Chicago White Sox (1931–1933), St. Louis Browns (1934–1935), Chicago White Sox (1935–1936) and St. Louis Browns (1941), batting .244 with one career home run in 394 career games.

Bridgeport remained in the league as the eight-team Eastern League had a tumultuous season in 1930, as four teams folded during the season and a playoff was held that included Bridgeton. William Carey had replaced Herman Weisman as league president as the Great Depression greatly affected minor leagues. with the Eastern League playing a split-season schedule, the Allentown Dukes won first half pennant. Bridgeport then won the second half pennant. The Eastern League ended the season with four teams after the Hartford Senators and Pittsfield Hillies teams folded on July 1 and the New Haven Profs and Providence Grays teams folded July 17. Completing their season, Bridgeton ended the season with an overall record of 91–74 record, as Hans Lobert returned as manager. Bridgeport finished 1 1/2 behind Allentown Dukes (95–75) in the overall standings. In the playoff final, Allentown defeated Bridgeport 4 games to 1. Bridgeport pitcher Howard Signor had a league leading 2.45 ERA in his second of three seasons pitching for the Bears.

The Bridgeport Bears were the runner up in the 1931 Eastern League final standings. Finishing in second place in the overall standings, the Bears had an 81–60 record under manager Hans Lobert, finishing 18.0 behind Hartford Senators in the standings of the eight-team league. New Haven and Hartford returned after folding the year prior. Hartford won both halves of the split season schedule and no playoff was held with second place Bridgeport. Bridgeport pitcher Jim Mooney had a league leading 1.69 ERA to go with his 17–4 record on the season. At age 24, the lefthander Mooney made his major league debut with the New York Giants following his end of his season with Bridgeport, In his major league career, Mooney compiled a 17–20 record with a 4.25 pitching for the New York Giants (1931–1932) and St. Louis Cardinals (1933–1934), winning the 1934 World Series. Mooney pitched a scoreless relief appearance in the World Series for St. Louis, his final major league game. Mooney was sent to Bridgeport by the New York Giants after spring training as the Giants manager John McGraw entrusted his former player and coach, Hans Lobert to assist in Mooney's development.

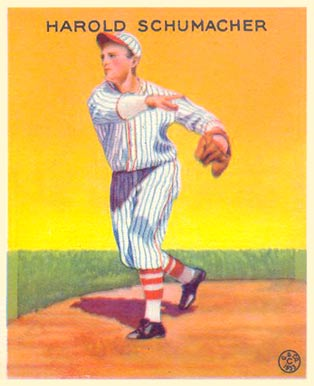
(1933) Hal Schumacher, New York Giants, baseball card. Schumacher pitched for Bridgeport in 1931, his only minor league season. Schumacher won a World Series with the Giants and had a 158–121 career record making two All-star teams.

In his only minor league season, pitcher Hal Schumacher pitched for Bridgeport in the 1931 season at age 20. After playing at Saint Lawrence University in Canton, New York, Schumacher was signed by the New York Giants with the stipulation that the Giants pay for him to finish his degree requirements. Schumacher immediately started in the major leagues and pitched his debut for the New York Giants in the second game of the major league season on April 15, 1931. After a rough start that day he was sent to Bridgeport. After a 4–2 record in 8 games with the Bears, Schumacher was promoted back to the New York Giants on September 7, 1931, to finish the season in the major leagues. Schumacher then remained with the New York Giants through the 1946 season, losing three full seasons to military service. Beginning in 1942, Schumacher served during World War II in the U.S. Navy. He was a lieutenant aboard the Cape Esperance aircraft carrier. A two-time All-star with the Giants, Shumacher compiled a 158–121 career record, with 329 starts, 137 complete games and 26 shutouts and added seven saves. In World Series play, he went 2–2 with a 4.13 ERA. Following the 1946 season, Schumacher retired as a player and became a vice president in charge of sales for the Adirondack Bat Company remaining with the company when they became Rawlings Adirondack. The produced major league-quality baseball bats and also made bowling pins. Schumacher visited major league spring training camps with his position. n 1967 Schumacher retired from Adirondack. In retirement, he worked at the Little League Baseball headquarters in Williamsport, Pennsylvania where he organized youth instructional programs.

Outfielder Arthur Mansfield played in 35 games with Bridgeton in 1931, batting .246 with 4 home runs. The prior season, Mansfield hit 27 home runs and batted .341 for the Springfield Blue Sox of the Central League. Mansfield played in just 13 minor league games over the next two seasons to conclude his playing career. Mansfield graduated from the University of Wisconsin, where he competed in football, baseball, basketball and boxing as a student athlete for the Badgers. In 1929, he became a coach and athletic director at Springfield High School in Wisconsin while playing minor league baseball. Mansfield served as the head baseball coach of the Wisconsin Badgers from 1940 to 1970. He also taught at Wisconsin for 36 years. Mansfield lead the Badgers to two Big 10 Conference championships, a fourth-place finish in the 1950 College World Series and won 441 career games as the Badgers baseball coach.

Catcher Harry Danning played for Bridgeport at age 19 in 1931 in his first professional season. He was discovered playing semiprofessional baseball by the former owner of the Boston Braves, George Washington Grant. Grant recommended Danning to New York Giants owner Charles Stoneham. Danning then signed a contract with the Giants to play with Bridgeport for $150 per month. He batted .324 with 5 home runs in 93 games for the Bears and returned to the team in 1932. After his 1932 season with Bridgeport, Danning became a teammate with his Bridgeport batterymate Hal Schumacher in the major leagues. Danning played with the New York Giants from 1933 to 1942, making four All-star teams. His playing career was interrupted by World War II and he never played again. Danning served at the Long Beach Army Air Field, where he conducted physical training for the troops and managing the base baseball team. He received a medical discharge from military service in June 1945 due to severe arthritis that developed in both of his knees, negating his return to professional baseball. Not eligible for a baseball pension, Danning lived with his daughter and her family after work retirement until his death at age 93.

=== 1932: Final Eastern League season ===
In 1932, the Bears officially became a minor league affiliate of the New York Giants in a shortened season, with Fred Voss Jr. becoming the Eastern League president. The Bridgeport Bears ended the season in sixth place in the eight-team league with a 33–42 record. Bridgeport native Bud Stapleton returned as manager to begin the season. Player/manager Harry Layne batted .339 with 3 home runs in 67 games as an outfielder for Bridgeport at age 31. Bridgeport sat 18.0 games behind the first place Springfield Rifles when league folded on July 17, 1932, during the Great Depression.

Harry Danning returned to begin the season with Bridgeton, batting .320 in 37 games with the Bears in their shortened season. Danning moved to the Winston-Salem Twins after Bridgeport and the league folded. The Twins were also a New York Giants affiliate. Danning began his ten-season tenure as the catcher for the New York Giants in 1933, where he was a member of four all-star teams. Danning had his career shortened by his military service during World War II in the U.S. Army, beginning in 1943. Upon his discharge from the Army in 1945, arthritic knees ended his baseball playing career.

The Eastern League did not reform in 1933 and Bridgeport was without a minor league team for eight seasons. Bridgeport next hosted minor league baseball when the 1941 Bridgeport Bees resumed play as members of the International League as a Boston Braves minor league affiliate.

== The ballparks ==
=== The Barnum Grounds ===
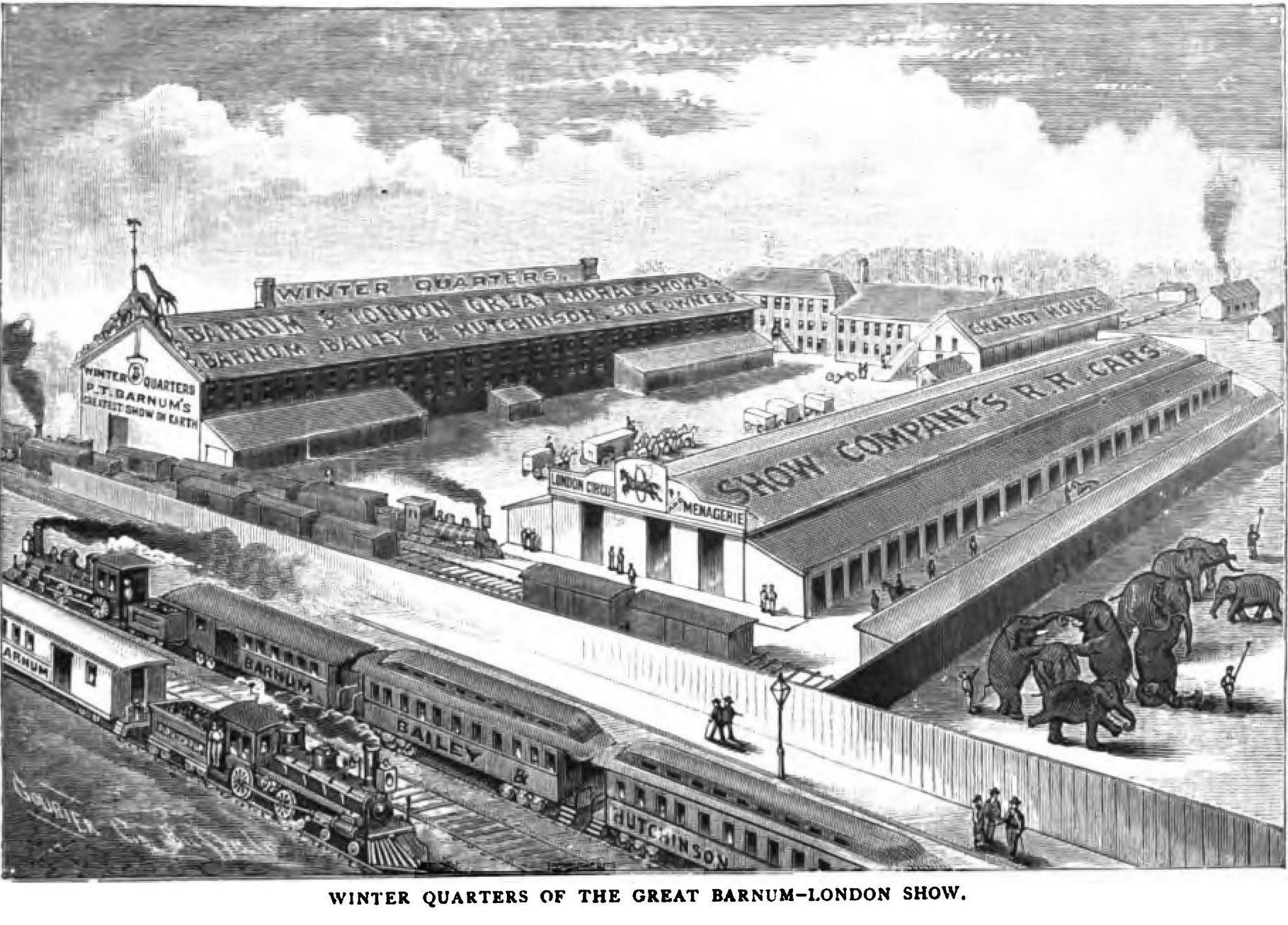
(1886) winter quarters of P.T. Barnum's (Barnum-London) circus in Bridgeport, Connecticut.

From their first season in 1885 through the 1898 season, Bridgeport hosted home minor league games at The Barnum Grounds. The ballpark site was located at State Street & Norman Street in Bridgeport, Connecticut. In the era, the ballpark parcel was part of P.T. Barnum's Winter Headquarters for the circus staging. Barnum was a Bridgeport resident, and the land on the northern portion of his circus winter quarters was utilized for the baseball park during the summer. Today, the corner site is both residential and commercial property.

Prior to the 1898 season, the Bridgeport teams also played select games at Bridgeport's Pleasure Beach, which was accessible only by ferry in the era; Athletic Park, located at Boston Avenue & Success Avenue in Bridgeport; and at Avon Park in neighboring Stratford, Connecticut.

=== Newfield Park ===
Beginning in 1898, Bridgeport minor league teams hosted home games at the Newfield Park. The site still hosts baseball today. The ballpark was also called the Lost Ball Pond Ballpark in the era, due to an adjacent pond.

In the era, much of the land around Bridgeport's Newfield neighborhood was owned by Baseball Hall of Fame member Jim O'Rourke and his older brother, John O'Rourke. Jim O'Rourke used the northern portion of the land to build a new ballpark for the Bridgeport Orators franchise that he owned and managed. The ballpark first hosted a baseball game on Friday, May 13, 1898, for an exhibition game between the Bridgeport Orators and the Springfield Ponies of the Eastern League.

On Sunday, April 28, 1918, the Boston Red Sox defeated the Bridgeport in an exhibition game at the site. Boston had pitcher Babe Ruth on the 1918 team.

== Timeline ==
Year(s)	# Yrs.	Team	Level	League	Ballpark
1885 (1)	1	Bridgeport Giants	Independent	Southern New England League	Barnum Grounds
1885–1887	3	Bridgeport Giants	Independent	Eastern League	Barnum Grounds
1888	1	Bridgeport Giants	Independent	Connecticut State League	Barnum Grounds
1895	1	Bridgeport Victors	Independent	Connecticut State League	Barnum Grounds
1896	1	Bridgeport Victors	Independent	Naugatuck Valley League	Barnum Grounds
1897	1	Bridgeport Soubrettes	Class F	Connecticut State League	Barnum Grounds
1898–1901	4	Bridgeport Orators	Class F	Connecticut State League	Newfield Park
1902–1904	3	Bridgeport Orators	Class D	Connecticut State League	Newfield Park
1905–1912	8	Bridgeport Orators	Class B	Connecticut State League	Newfield Park
1913–1915	3	Bridgeport Crossmen	Class B	Connecticut State League	Newfield Park
1916	1	Bridgeport Hustlers	Class B	Eastern League	Newfield Park
1917–1923	7	Bridgeport Americans	Class B	Eastern League	Newfield Park
1924–1932	9	Bridgeport Bears	Class B	Eastern League	Newfield Park

== Year–by–year records ==
Year	Record	Finish	Manager	Playoffs
1885 (1)	33–25	NA	Dan Shannon	Joined Eastern League August 13
1885 (2)	12–17	NA	Dan Shannon	Entered the league August 14
1886	33–57	5th	James Donnelly	No playoffs held
1887	35-15	NA	Dan Shannon	Won 1st half pennant Team folded July 6
1888	9–9	NA	Bullen	Moved to Stamford in May; Stamford folded June 27
1895	8–3	1st	Jim O'Rourke	League champions No playoffs held
1896	25–15	1st	Jim O'Rourke	League champions No playoffs held
1897	33–37	3rd	Jim O'Rourke	No playoffs held
1898	51–45	4th	Tom Ivers / Jim O'Rourke	No playoffs held
1899	43–54	7th	Jim O'Rourke	No playoffs held
1900	57–41	3rd	Jim O'Rourke	No playoffs held
1901	61–43	2nd	Jim O'Rourke	No playoffs held
1902	53–59	5th	Jim O'Rourke	No playoffs held
1903	59–47	3rd	Jim O'Rourke	No playoffs held
1904	71–45	1st	Jim O'Rourke	League champions No playoffs held
1905	64–49	3rd	Jim O'Rourke	No playoffs held
1906	54–72	7th	Jim O'Rourke	No playoffs held
1907	48–75	6th	Jim O'Rourke	No playoffs held
1908	55–71	6th	Jim O'Rourke	No playoffs held
1909	44–78	8th	Jim O'Rourke	No playoffs held
1910	67–52	2nd	Gene McCann	No playoffs held
1911	71–47	2nd	Gene McCann / Robert Tracey	No playoffs held
1912	61–55	3rd	Gene McCann	No playoffs held
1913	69–63	4th	Gene McCann / Buck Freeman; Monte Cross	No playoffs held
1914	67–56	3rd	Jake Boultes	No playoffs held
1916	44–78	7th	Neal Ball / Mike Healy	No playoffs held
1917	50–52	4th	Paul Krichell	No playoffs held
1918	44–12	2nd	Paul Krichell / Ray Grimes	League folded July 22
1919	59–47	4th	Roy Grimes	No playoffs held
1920	70–70	5th	Ed Walsh	No playoffs held
1921	85–66	3rd	Gene McCann	No playoffs held
1922	78–73	3rd	Gene McCann	No playoffs held
1923	71–81	5th	Gene McCann / Fred Fisher	No playoffs held
1924	65–88	8th	John O'Hara / Joe Smith; Art Butler (1–3) / Dick Hoblitzel (25–33)	No playoffs held
1925	76–78	6th	Kaiser Wilhelm	No playoffs held
1926	91–63	3rd	Bud Stapleton	No playoffs held
1927	84–70	4th	Bud Stapleton	No playoffs held
1928	77–76	7th	Bud Stapleton / Billy Whitman; Bob Emmerich	No playoffs held
1929	91–63	2nd	Hans Lobert	No playoffs held
1930	91–74	2nd	Hans Lobert	Won 2nd half pennant Lost League Finals
1931	81–60	2nd	Hans Lobert	No playoffs held
1932	33–42	6th	Bud Stapleton / Harry Layne	League disbanded July 17

== Notable alumni ==
- Jim O'Rourke (1895–1909, Owner/MGR), Inducted Baseball Hall of Fame, 1945
- Ed Walsh (1920, MGR) Inducted Baseball Hall of Fame, 1946
- Billy Alvord (1886)
- Neal Ball (1916, MGR)
- Dick Bartell (1927) 2x MLB All-star
- John F. Blake (1916, 1919)
- Joe Boehling (1921)
- Jake Boultes (1914, MGR)
- Joe Brown (1886–1887)
- Art Butler (1924, MGR)
- Harry Courtney (1927)
- Roy Clark (1903–1904)
- Monte Cross (1923, MGR)
- Harry Danning (1931–1932) 4x MLB All-Star
- Jerry Denny (1898, 1902)
- Patsy Dougherty (1899–1901)
- Bob Emmerich (1920–1923, 1927–1929; 1928, MGR)
- Alex Ferguson (1917–1918)
- Pop Foster (1895–1899, 1903–1905)
- Buck Freeman (1913, MGR)
- Ray Grimes (1917–1920; 1918, MGR)
- Roy Grimes (1919, MGR)
- Frank Grube (1929)
- Dick Hoblitzel (1924, MGR)
- Buck Jordan (1929)
- Benny Kauff (1911)
- Wally Kimmick (1929–1930)
- Paul Krichell (1917–1918, MGR)
- Hi Ladd (1902–1911)
- Hans Lobert (1929–1931, MGR)
- Hans Lobert (1929–1931, MGR)
- Billy Lush (1895; 1916 owner)
- Arthur Mansfield (1931)
- Gene McCann (1910–1913; 1921–1923, Owner/MGR)
- Jim Mooney (1931)
- Dick Nallin (1910)
- Jerry Nops (1908)
- Frank O'Rourke (1912)
- Jimmy O'Rourke (1903–1908)
- John Puhl (1899)
- Jose Rodriguez (1921–1925; 1928–1929)
- Hal Schumacher (1931) 2x MLB All-Star
- Dan Shannon (1885, 1887, MGR)
- Joe Smith (1924, MGR)
- Kaiser Wilhelm (1925, MGR)
- Mike Wilson (1924)
- Red Waller (1906–1908, 1910)
- Jack Warhop (1927)
- Ad Yale (1898–1905)
- Bridgeport Orators players
- Bridgeport Americans players
- Bridgeport Crossmen players
- Bridgeport Giants players
- Bridgeport Hustlers players
- Bridgeport minor league baseball team players
- Bridgeport Soubrettes players
- Bridgeport Victors players
- Bridgeport Bears (baseball) players

== See also ==
- Bridgeport minor league baseball team
