= Bridgeport minor league baseball team =

Bridgeport minor league team
- 1885–1950; (1885–1888, 1895–1914, 1916–1932, 1941, 1947–1950); Bridgeport, Connecticut

Minor league affiliations
- Previous classes: Class-B (1941, 1947–1950); Class-A (1919–1932); Class-B (1905–1914, 1916–1918); Class-D (1902–1904); Class-F (1897–1901)
- League: Colonial League (1947–1951); Interstate League (1941); Eastern League (1916–1932); Eastern Association (1913–1914); Connecticut State League (1904–1912); Connecticut League (1903); Connecticut State League (1900–1902); Connecticut League (1899); Connecticut State League (1897–1898); Naugatuck Valley League (1896); Connecticut State League (1888, 1895); Eastern League (1885–1887); Southern New England League (1885)

Major league affiliations
- Previous teams: Washington Senators (1948); Boston Braves (1941); New York Giants (1929–1932)

Team data
- Previous names: Bridgeport Bees (1941, 1947–1950); Bridgeport Bears (1924–1932); Bridgeport Americans (1917–1923); Bridgeport Hustlers (1916); Bridgeport Crossmen (1913–1914); Bridgeport Orators (1898–1912); Bridgeport Soubrettes (1897); Bridgeport Victors (1895–1896); Bridgeport (1888); Bridgeport Giants (1885–1887)
- Previous parks: Candlelite Stadium; Newfield Park

Several minor league baseball teams have played in Bridgeport, Connecticut from 1885 to the present day.

The first professional team was the Bridgeport Giants who played in the Eastern League from 1885 through 1887. Bridgeport moved to the Connecticut State League in 1888 and became the Bridgeport Victors for the 1895 and 1896 seasons.

They were nicknamed the Bridgeport Orators in 1898 to coincide with the nickname of the team's owner and manager, Baseball hall of famer Jim "The Orator" O'Rourke. In 1904, the team won a league record 71 games and went on to win the championship. Their home games were played at Newfield Park which was located on Newfield Ave.

In 1913 they moved to the Eastern Association as the Bridgeport Crossmen and they moved again, to a new version of the Eastern League in 1916, where they would remain until the league folded in 1932. This version of the team was known as the Americans until 1923 and then the Bears.

In 1941 they resurfaced as the Bees in the Interstate League but were shut down again by the onset of World War II. The team returned in 1947 in the Colonial League where they remained until they folded in 1950.

No team played in Bridgeport until the Bridgeport Bluefish of the Atlantic League of Professional Baseball started in 1998.
