= José Rodríguez (infielder, born 1894) =

Cuban baseball player (1894–1953)

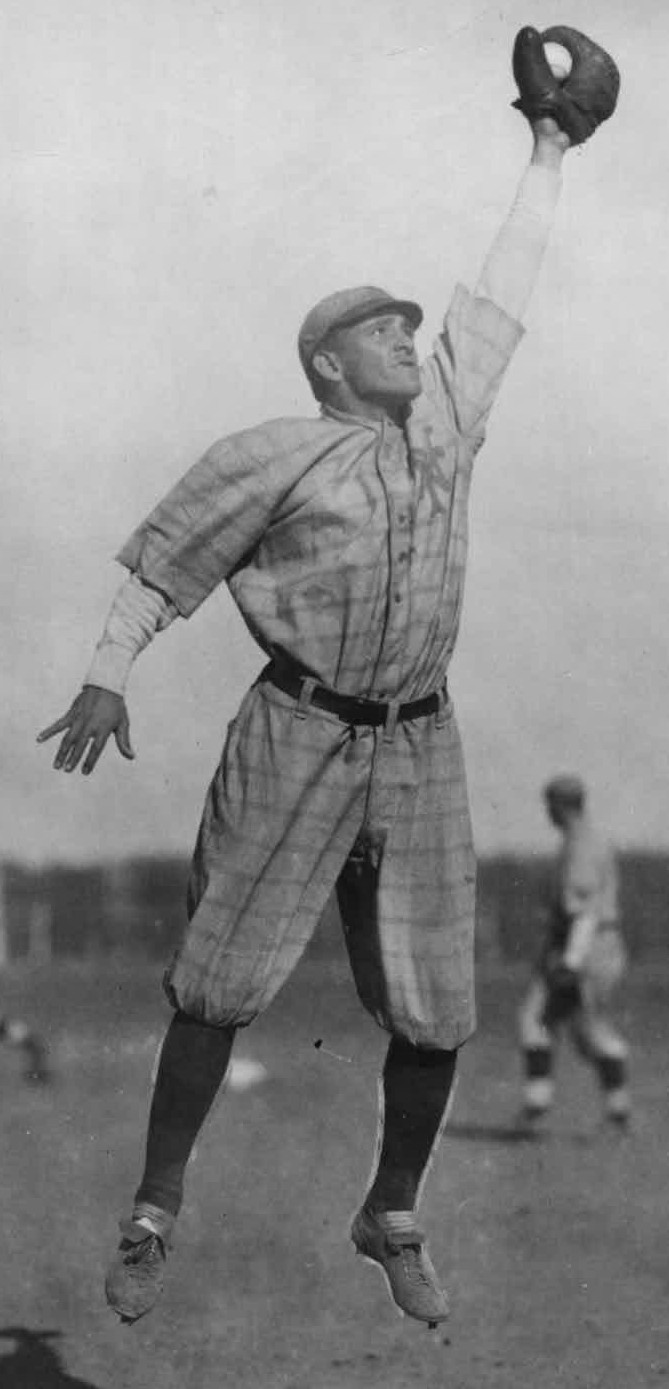
- Second baseman
- Born: February 23, 1894; Havana, Cuba
- Died: January 21, 1953 (aged 58); Havana, Cuba
- Batted: Right Threw: Right

MLB debut
- October 5, 1916, for the New York Giants

Last MLB appearance
- September 2, 1918, for the New York Giants

MLB statistics
- Batting average: .166
- Home runs: 0
- Runs batted in: 17
- Stats at Baseball Reference

Teams
- New York Giants (1916–1918)

Member of the Cuban

Baseball Hall of Fame
- Induction: 1951
Medals
Coach for Venezuela
Men's baseball
Amateur World Series
Gold medal – first place	1941 Havana	Team

José Rodríguez (February 23, 1894 – January 21, 1953), nicknamed "Joseíto" or "El Hombre Goma" in Spanish and "Joe" in English, was a Cuban infielder who played in Major League Baseball from 1916 to 1918 and in the Cuban League from 1914 to 1939. In the majors, he played for the New York Giants and was primarily a second baseman, while in the Cuban League and the U.S. minor leagues he mostly played first base. A defensive specialist, according to Roberto González Echevarría, Rodríguez "was considered the best defensive first baseman in Cuba" of his time. He was also a long-time manager in the Cuban League and managed for one season in the minors. He was inducted into the Cuban Baseball Hall of Fame in 1951.

== Baseball career ==
=== United States ===
José Rodríguez toured the United States with a Cuban team, the Habana Reds, in 1915 and was recruited by the New York Giants. He joined the Giants in spring training in 1916. News reports from spring training suggested that Rodriguez "may develop into a high class player like Palmero, the young Cuban pitcher," and that manager John McGraw expected him "to develop into a star first baseman." After spring training he was assigned to the New London Planters in the Eastern League, where he hit .263.

Rodríguez debuted with the Giants on October 5, 1916, when he appeared as a pinch runner. In 1917 he was assigned to the Rochester Hustlers in the International League, where he hit .252. When he was again called up by the Giants, he played in seven major league games and hit .200 in 20 at bats.

After spring training in 1918, Rodríguez was retained by the Giants as their utility infielder. He hit poorly, and after Larry Doyle, the regular second baseman, had surgery in May, the Giants acquired other infielders such as Bert Niehoff and Ed Sicking. Rodríguez ended the season with a .160 batting average in 40 games. After the season, he was traded to Rochester, ending his major league career.

Rodríguez played the next two seasons as Rochester's first baseman, hitting .264 and .320. When the Rochester team was sold after the 1920 season, the new owners, George Stallings and Walter Hapgood, sold most their players; Rodríguez was sold to the Bridgeport Americans of the Eastern League. He played in the Eastern League from 1921 to 1930, playing for Bridgeport, the Worcester Panthers, the Providence Rubes, and the Pittsfield Hillies. He hit as high as .316, and his overall minor league average was .284. He played for the Canton Terriers of the Central League and the Binghamton Triplets of the New York–Pennsylvania League in 1930 and 1931, before returning to the Eastern League where he ended his U.S. career with the Allentown Buffaloes and Norfolk Tars in 1931 and 1932.

Rodríguez returned to minor league baseball for one season in 1948 as the manager of the Sherman-Denison Twins in the Big State League.

=== Cuba ===
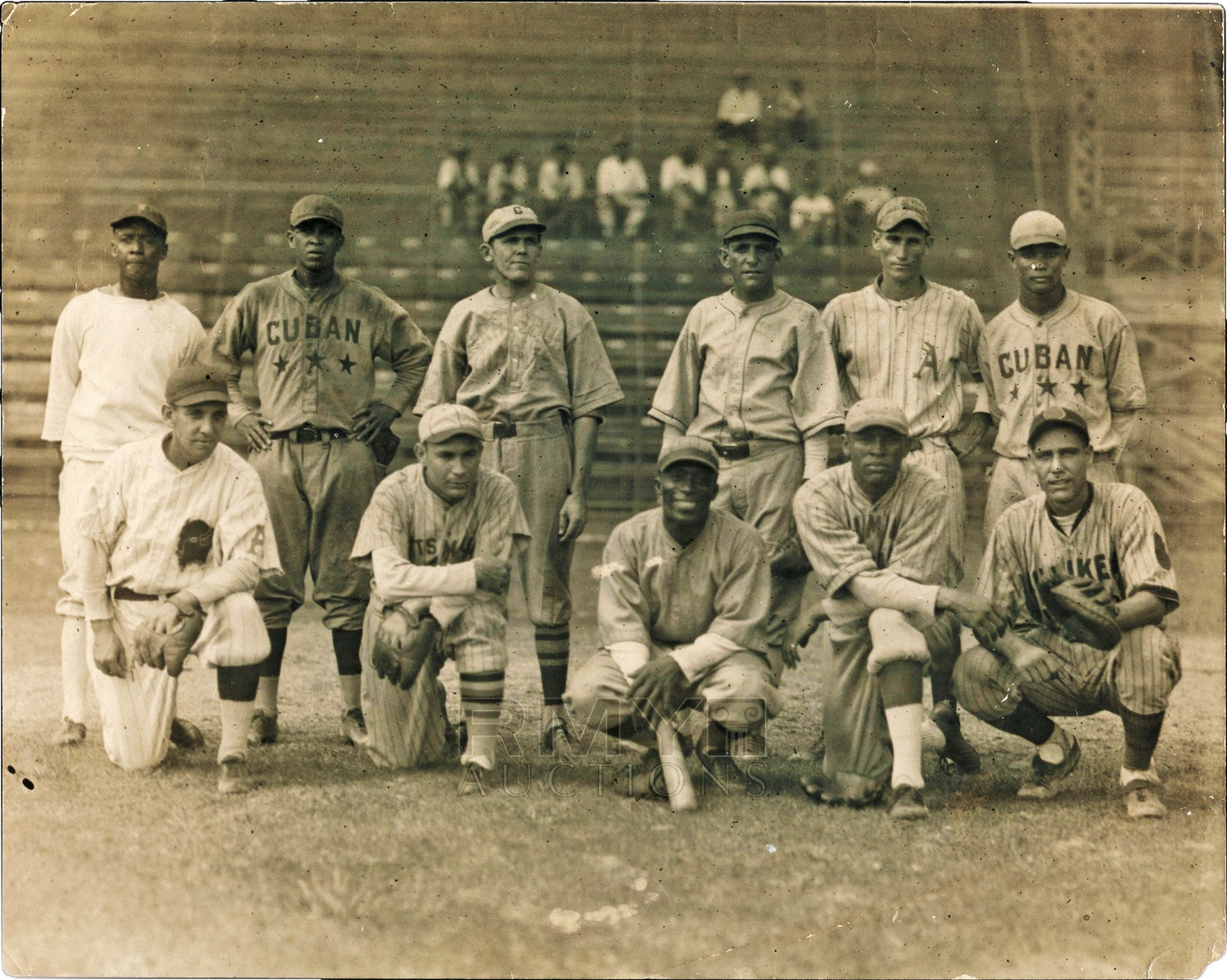
1932 All Star team

Rodríguez began his professional career in the winter of 1914/15 as the first baseman of the Fe club of the Cuban League. The following winter he moved to Almendares. The team, which included Cristóbal Torriente, Adolfo Luque, José Méndez, Ramón Herrera, and Rafael Almeida, won the championship, with Rodríguez hitting .286. He again played for a championship team, the Orientals, in the winter of 1917, but hit only .194. The league didn't play in the winter of 1917/18, but in 1918/19 he again played for Almendares and hit .312.

In 1919/20 he moved to Habana, where he played shortstop and hit .278. In 1920/21, still with Habana, he played third base and was part of another championship, hitting .226. The next winter, the Cuban League season terminated after only five games; Rodríguez had returned to first base and hit .368.

The following winter, 1922/23, his role shifted as he became the playing manager of Almendares. In his third season as manager, 1924/25, he won the league championship with a team powered by Negro league stars, including five future members of the U.S. Baseball Hall of Fame—Bullet Rogan, Andy Cooper, John Henry ("Pop") Lloyd, Biz Mackey, and Oscar Charleston—as well as Dick Lundy, Newt Allen, and Valentín Dreke, and major leaguers Adolfo Luque and José Acosta.

He won his next championship as manager for Almendares in 1931/32, his last season as a full-time player and a season in which no American players were signed to play in the Cuban league. He continued to play part-time until 1938/39 and to manage for various teams until 1943/44. In 1950 he became the general manager of the minor league Havana Cubans.

== Personal life and death ==
Rodríguez was born in Havana in 1894. His younger brother, Oscar Rodríguez, also became a baseball player and manager in the Cuban League and the minor leagues and joined José as a member of the Cuban Baseball Hall of Fame in 1960.

Rodríguez was a coach on the Venezuela national baseball team under Manuel "Pollo" Malpica that played at the 1941 Amateur World Series in Havana. He died in 1953 at the age of 58.
