= Newfield =

Newfield, New Field, Newfields, or variant, may refer to:

== People ==
- Alexa Newfield (born 1991), U.S. soccer player
- Heidi Newfield (born 1970), U.S. country music singer
- Jack Newfield (1938-2004), U.S. journalist
- Marc Newfield (born 1972), U.S. baseball player
- Morris Newfield (1869-1940), Hungarian-American rabbi
- Sam Newfield (1899-1964), U.S. film director

== Places ==
=== United Kingdom ===
==== England ====
- Newfield, Bishop Auckland, County Durham
- Newfield, Chester-le-Street, County Durham
- Newfield, Staffordshire, a location in the UK
- New Field, a cricket ground in Winchester, Hampshire
- Newfield Hall, a hotel and former manor in North Yorkshire
- Newfield Secondary School, in Sheffield, South Yorkshire

==== Scotland ====
- Newfield, Highland, a hamlet
- Newfield Park, Johnstone, a soccer grounds in Renfrewshire
- Newfield Primary School, in Whitfield, Dundee

=== United States ===
- Newfield, Arizona, Pima County
- Newfield Park, Bridgeport, a park in Connecticut
- Newfields, the museum campus that houses the Indianapolis Museum of Art in Indiana
- Newfield, Maine
  - Newfield (Willowbrook) Historic District, an NRHP-listed district
- Newfield, New Jersey
- Newfield, New York
  - Newfield Hamlet, New York
- Newfield Bridge, a covered bridge in Newfield, New York
- Newfield High School, Selden, New York
- Newfield Township, Michigan
- Newfields, New Hampshire, a New England town
  - Newfields (CDP), New Hampshire, the main village in the town

== See also ==
- Newfield Green, an area in Sheffield, Yorkshire, England, UK
- Newfield, County Durham (disambiguation)
- Newfield Park (disambiguation)
- Newfield School (disambiguation)
- Field (disambiguation)
- New (disambiguation)
