= Newfield Park =

Newfield Park may refer to:

- Newfield Park, Bridgeport, a park in Bridgeport, Connecticut that has previously been used as a baseball venue
- Newfield Park, Johnstone, a defunct football ground in Johnstone, Scotland
- Newfield Park Primary School, Halesowen, West Midlands, England

== See also ==
- Newfield (disambiguation)
