= William Yale =

William Yale may refer to:

- William H. Yale (1831–1917), Minnesota lieutenant governor
- Ad Yale (William M. Yale, 1870–1948), baseball player
- William Yale (merchant), merchant from Meriden
