= Jimmy O'Rourke (baseball) =

American baseball player (1883-1955)

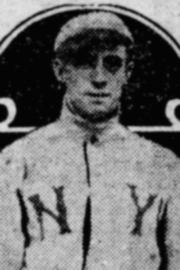
- Outfielder
- Born: December 26, 1883; Bridgeport, Connecticut, U.S.
- Died: December 22, 1955 (aged 71); Sparrows Point, Maryland, U.S.
- Batted: Right Threw: Right

MLB debut
- August 15, 1908, for the New York Highlanders

Last MLB appearance
- October 8, 1908, for the New York Highlanders

MLB statistics
- Batting average: .231
- Home runs: 0
- Runs batted in: 3
- Stats at Baseball Reference

Teams
- New York Highlanders (1908)

James Stephen "Queenie" O'Rourke (December 26, 1883 – December 22, 1955) was an American professional baseball player. He played in Major League Baseball for the New York Highlanders in 1908, primarily as a left fielder and shortstop.

== Biography ==
O'Rourke was the son of Baseball Hall of Fame inductee Jim O'Rouke; the father was often called "Orator Jim" with the son referred to as "Jimmy". John O'Rourke, brother of Orator Jim, was also a major league player. Jimmy O'Rourke attended Yale University, where he played shortstop on the varsity baseball team in 1901 as a freshman. After being unable to play in 1902 for academic reasons, O'Rourke started playing professionally in 1903, ending his collegiate eligibility. He did complete his degree at Yale, graduating in June 1904.

O'Rourke played baseball professionally from 1903 to 1915, and during 1922 and 1924. His major league career consisted of 34 games for the 1908 New York Highlanders, during which he compiled a .231 batting average with three runs batted in. He started 28 games for New York: 13 in left field, 10 at shortstop, three at second base, and two at third base.

In the minor leagues, O'Rourke played over 1200 games in 15 seasons. He batted .303 for the Bridgeport Orators of the Connecticut State League in 1907; records for some of his seasons are incomplete. After apparently not playing professionally from 1916 through 1921, O'Rourke batted .283 in 23 games for the Syracuse Stars of the International League in 1922, and .236 in 88 games for the Ottawa-Hull Senators of the Ontario–Quebec–Vermont League in 1924. In 1923, he served as manager of the Ottawa Canadiens in the Eastern Canada League.

O'Rourke died in December 1955; he was survived by his wife and a son. While O'Rourke is listed on various baseball references sites under the nickname "Queenie", research by the Society for American Baseball Research indicates that the nickname was "historically contrived", as it was not known to be used during O'Rourke's career and only appeared after his death.

== See also ==
- List of second-generation Major League Baseball players
