= John Puhl =

American baseball player (1876–1900)

- Third baseman
- Born: July 10, 1876; Brooklyn, New York, U.S.
- Died: August 24, 1900 (aged 24); Bayonne, New Jersey, U.S.
- Batted: Unknown Threw: Unknown

MLB debut
- October 13, 1898, for the New York Giants

Last MLB appearance
- May 31, 1899, for the New York Giants

MLB statistics
- Batting average: .182
- Home runs: 0
- Runs Batted in: 1
- Stats at Baseball Reference

Teams
- New York Giants (1898–1899)

John G. Puhl (July 10, 1876 – August 24, 1900) was an American professional baseball player from Brooklyn, New York, who appeared in three games over two seasons with the New York Giants from 1898 to 1899.

He began his professional baseball career with the New London Whalers of the Connecticut State League in 1898 at the age of 21. He played for the Whalers from May 4 until September 10 then was signed by the New York Giants of the National League. Puhl appeared in two games for the Giants as their third baseman, collecting two hits in nine at bats, scored one run and had one run batted in.

In 1899, Puhl returned to the Connecticut League to play for the Bridgeport Orators, and appeared in 19 games and had a .145 batting average. Later in season, he again signed with the Giants, playing one game at third base, and went hitless in two at bats.

Puhl died at the age of 24 of pulmonary tubercular phthisis in Bayonne, New Jersey, and is interred at Holy Name Cemetery in Jersey City, New Jersey.
