= John F. Blake (coach) =

American athlete and coach (1895–1974)

John "Boney" Blake
Biographical details
- Born: January 20, 1895; Danbury, Connecticut, U.S.
- Died: June 30, 1974 (aged 79); Northport, New York, U.S.
- Education: Niagara University

Playing career

Baseball
- 1913–1914: Danbury Hatters
- 1915: Jersey City Skeeters
- 1916, 1919: Bridgeport Hustlers
- 1919: Hartford Senators
- 1920–1921: Hamilton Tigers
- 1922: Port Huron-Sarnia Saints

Coaching career (HC unless noted)

Men's basketball
- 1919–1923: Niagara
- 1933–1934: Fordham (Asst.)

Football
- 1919–1922: Niagara

Baseball
- 1919–1923: Niagara

John Francis "Boney" Blake (January 20, 1895 – June 30, 1974) was an American athlete and coach at Niagara University.

== Playing ==
A native of Danbury, Connecticut, Blake was a standout baseball and basketball player at Niagara University. He played professional baseball for the Danbury Hatters (1913–1914), Jersey City Skeeters (1915), Bridgeport Hustlers (1916, 1919), Hartford Senators (1919), Hamilton Tigers (1920–1921), and Port Huron-Sarnia Saints (1922). He also played professional basketball in Danbury from 1915 to 1918. He was one of the three initial members of the Niagara University basketball hall of fame, alongside Larry Costello and Bucky Connelly.

== Coaching ==
Blake graduated from Niagara in 1915 and served in the United States Army during World War I. After his discharge, he returned to the university as football, baseball, and basketball coach. His baseball teams compiled a 86–14 record and his 1921–22 Niagara Purple Eagles men's basketball team finished with a 27–4 record and beat the Crescent Athletic Club. He was replaced as coach in June 1923 by Pete Dwyer, but remained at the university as a mathematics instructor. He left Niagara in 1924 to become a professor at St. John's University. He returned to coaching in 1933 as an assistant basketball coach at Fordham.

== Death ==
Blake died on June 30, 1974 at a veteran's hospital in Northport, New York after a brief illness. He had one son, a minister.
