= Roy Clark (baseball) =

American baseball player (1874-1925)

- Outfielder
- Born: May 11, 1874; New Haven, Connecticut, U.S.
- Died: November 1, 1925 (aged 51); Bridgeport, Connecticut, U.S.
- Batted: Left Threw: Right

MLB debut
- April 19, 1902, for the New York Giants

Last MLB appearance
- July 12, 1902, for the New York Giants

MLB statistics
- Batting average: .150
- Home runs: 0
- Runs batted in: 3
- Stats at Baseball Reference

Teams
- New York Giants (1902)

Roy Elliott Clark, nicknamed Pepper (May 11, 1874 – November 1, 1925) was an American baseball and football player.

Clark was born in 1875 in New Haven, Connecticut. He moved with his family to Holyoke, Massachusetts, in 1879. He attended public schools in Holyoke and later Wilbraham Academy, Wesleyan, and Brown University. At Brown he was captain of the baseball team for three consecutive years.

Clark later played professional baseball as an outfielder for the New York Giants of the National League in 1902. He appeared in 22 games, nine in center field, nine in right field, and three in left field, making one error in 28 chances. He compiled a .150 batting average with 12 hits in 80 at bats.

Clark also played right field for the Bridgeport Orators of the Connecticut League in 1903 and 1904. He compiled a .333 batting average in 1904. He was the only player in the league in 1904 to score 100 runs. The Bridgeport Telegam wrote: "Clark was an exceptionally able outfielder and judge of batters. No man ever played that right field better in this circuit. He now and then threw out at first base on drives supposed to be safe. . . . Clark in one game made two such plays. . . . He had speed, a keen eye, enthusiasm and steady habits and above all, headwork."

After his baseball career ended, Clark worked in the insurance business in Bridgeport, Connecticut. He married Katherine Emma Wheeler, and they had two sons, Wheeler and John. He suffered from Bright's disease and died in 1925 at the Bridgeport Hospital at age 51 after an illness of several weeks.
