= Newfield School =

Newfield School may refer to:

- Newfield Secondary School, a school in Sheffield, South Yorkshire, England, UK
- Newfield Primary School, a school in Whitfield, Dundee, Scotland, UK
- Newfield High School, a school in Seiden, New York, US

== See also ==
- Newfield (disambiguation)
- Newfield Park Primary School, a school in Halesowen, Dudley, West Midlands, England, UK
