= Art Butler =

American baseball player (1887–1984)

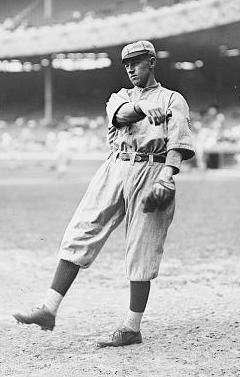
- Infielder
- Born: December 19, 1887; Fall River, Massachusetts, U.S.
- Died: October 7, 1984 (aged 96); Fall River, Massachusetts, U.S.
- Batted: Right Threw: Right

MLB debut
- April 14, 1910, for the Boston Rustlers

Last MLB appearance
- October 1, 1916, for the St. Louis Cardinals

MLB statistics
- Batting average: .241
- Home runs: 3
- Runs batted in: 98
- Stats at Baseball Reference

Teams
- Boston Rustlers (1911); Pittsburgh Pirates (1912–1913); St. Louis Cardinals (1914–1916)

Arthur Edward "Artie" Butler (born Arthur Bouthillier) (December 18, 1887 – October 7, 1984) was an American infielder in Major League Baseball. He played for the Boston Rustlers, Pittsburgh Pirates, and St. Louis Cardinals.

He was the last living teammate of Hall of Fame pitcher Cy Young.
