= 1921–22 Niagara Purple Eagles men's basketball team =

American college basketball season

1921–22 Niagara Purple Eagles men's basketball
- Conference: Independent
- Record: 27–4
- Head coach: John Blake (2nd season)

The 1921–22 Niagara Purple Eagles men's basketball team represented Niagara University during the 1921–22 NCAA college men's basketball season. The head coach was John Blake, coaching his second season with the Purple Eagles.

== Schedule ==
Date time, TV	Opponent	Result	Record	Site city, state
	Union	L 14–25	0–1	Lewiston, NY
12/16/1920	Albany Law	W 35–11	1–1	Lewiston, NY
	R.P.I.	W 38–25	2–1	Lewiston, NY
1/09/1922	at St. John's	W 43–33	3–1	Queens, NY
	Crescent A.C.	W 28–24	4–1	Lewiston, NY
	Seton Hall	W 63–49	5–1	Lewiston, NY
	Cathedral	W 42–25	6–1	Lewiston, NY
	St. Francis	W 33–32	7–1	Lewiston, NY
1/19/1922	at Canisius	W 31–11	8–1	Buffalo, NY
	Clarkson Tech	W 30–16	9–1	Lewiston, NY
1/29/1922	St. Bonaventure	W 33–16	10–1	Lewiston, NY
	Thiel	W 34–16	11–1	Lewiston, NY
	Detroit	W 40–16	12–1	Lewiston, NY
	Rochester Opt.	W 53–22	13–1	Lewiston, NY
	Mechanical Inst.	W 56–18	14–1	Lewiston, NY
	Hobart	W 27–16	15–1	Lewiston, NY
	Rochester	W 31–13	16–1	Lewiston, NY
2/16/1922	St. John's	L 23–25	16–2	Lewiston, NY
2/19/1922	at St. Bonaventure	L 25–29	16–3	St. Bonaventure, NY
	Allegheny	W 46–21	17–3	Lewiston, NY
3/05/1922	Canisius	W 30–19	18–3	Lewiston, NY
	Mechanical Inst.	W 50–14	19–3	Lewiston, NY
	Geneva	W 51–19	20–3	Lewiston, NY
	Niagara Alumni	W 52–19	21–3	Lewiston, NY
	Rochester Opt.	W 51–20	22–3	Lewiston, NY
	Saint Francis	W 30–27	23–3	Lewiston, NY
	Fort Niagara	W 62–07	24–3	Lewiston, NY
	Utica K of C	W 25–24	25–3	Lewiston, NY
	Erie St. Mary's	L 16–25	25–4	Lewiston, NY
	Kenilsworth	W 32–14	26–4	Lewiston, NY
	Holy Cross of Buffalo	W 50–34	27–4	Lewiston, NY
*Non-conference game. (#) Tournament seedings in parentheses.
