= Joe Smith (catcher) =

American baseball catcher (1893-1974)

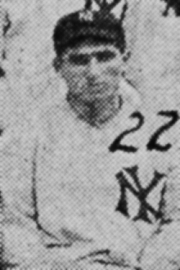
- Catcher
- Born: December 29, 1893; New York, New York, U.S.
- Died: January 12, 1974 (aged 80); Yonkers, New York, U.S.
- Batted: Right Threw: Right

MLB debut
- July 7, 1913, for the New York Yankees

Last MLB appearance
- September 27, 1913, for the New York Yankees

MLB statistics
- Batting average: .156
- Home runs: 0
- Runs batted in: 2
- Stats at Baseball Reference

Teams
- New York Yankees (1913)

Salvatore Joseph Smith (December 29, 1893 – January 12, 1974) was an American Major League Baseball catcher. Smith played for the New York Yankees in the 1913 season. In 14 career games, he had five hits, two RBIs and a .156 batting average. He batted and threw right-handed.

Smith was born in New York, New York, and died in Yonkers, New York.
