= Ad Yale =

American baseball player (1870–1948)

- First baseman
- Born: April 17, 1870; Bristol, Connecticut, U.S.
- Died: April 27, 1948 (aged 78); Bridgeport, Connecticut, U.S.
- Batted: Right Threw: Unknown

MLB debut
- September 18, 1905, for the Brooklyn Superbas

Last MLB appearance
- September 20, 1905, for the Brooklyn Superbas

MLB statistics
- Batting average: .077
- Home runs: 0
- Runs batted in: 1
- Stats at Baseball Reference

Teams
- Brooklyn Superbas (1905)

William M. "Ad" Yale (April 17, 1870 – April 27, 1948) was an American professional baseball player. He appeared in four games in Major League Baseball for the 1905 Brooklyn Superbas as a first baseman. He also had an extensive minor league baseball career, playing from 1897 until 1914 for a number of teams, primarily the Bridgeport Orators, for whom he played from 1898 to 1905.
