= Bob Emmerich =

American baseball player (1891-1948)

- Center fielder
- Born: August 1, 1891; New York City, New York, U.S.
- Died: November 22, 1948 (aged 57); Bridgeport, Connecticut, U.S.
- Batted: Right Threw: Right

MLB debut
- September 22, 1923, for the Boston Braves

Last MLB appearance
- October 6, 1923, for the Boston Braves

MLB statistics
- Batting average: .083
- Home runs: 0
- Runs batted in: 0
- Stats at Baseball Reference

Teams
- Boston Braves (1923)

Robert George Emmerich (August 1, 1891 – November 22, 1948) is an American former Major League Baseball player. He played one season with the Boston Braves.
