= New London Planters =

- 1913–1918; (1913-1914, 1916-1918); New London, Connecticut

Minor league affiliations
- Previous classes: Class-B
- League: Eastern League (1916-1918); Eastern Association (1913-1914)

Minor league titles
- League titles (2): 1914; 1916

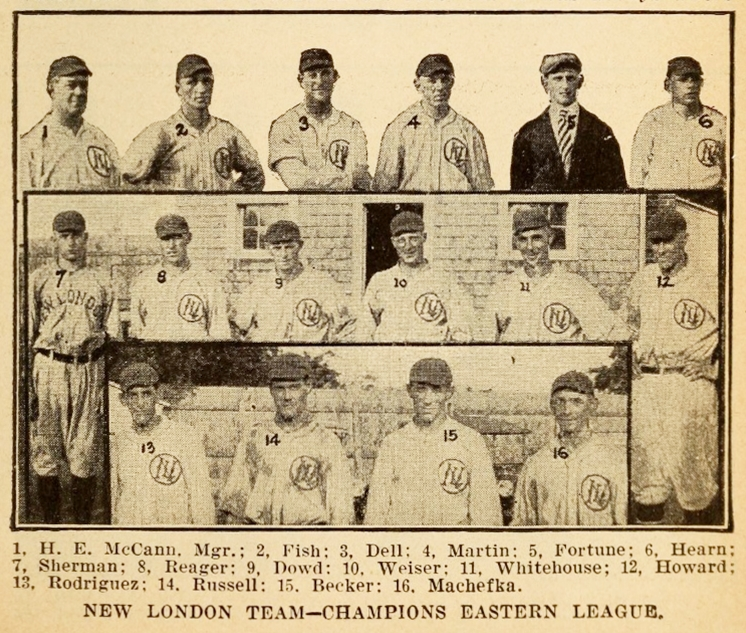
The 1916 New London Planters

The New London Planters were a minor league baseball team based in New London, Connecticut, that entered the now defunct Connecticut League in 1913, which had recently renamed itself the Eastern Association with the arrival of teams outside of the state. After finishing one game under .500 in their first year, the Planters won the 1914 championship, compiling an 81–35 record.

Following the disbandment of the Eastern Association after the season, a new league called the Eastern League was formed, which started play in 1916. This outfit, a Class B organization, featured teams from Connecticut to Maine, which is not to be confused with a top-level league, the Eastern League, which had changed its name to the International League four years earlier. In the Eastern League's first season, New London and Portland proved to be the teams to beat. After a successful start, the Planters were overtaken by Portland in mid-July, but later were able to regain the lead and eventually win the pennant by four games, finishing with an 86–34 record. The 1916 Planters were recognized as one of the 100 greatest minor league teams of all time.
