= Providence Rubes =

The Providence Rubes were an Eastern League baseball team based in Providence, Rhode Island. Their manager was Rube Marquard, after whom the team was presumably named. They were the league champions in 1926, their only year of existence.

They were affiliated with the Boston Braves.
