= Eastern League (1916–1932) =

American sports league in minor league baseball

- Classification: Class B (1916–1918); Class A (1919–1932)
- Sport: Baseball
- Founded: 1916
- Folded: 1932
- Owner: George Weiss (1919–1929)
- No. of teams: 8 annually
- Country: United States
- Last champion: Springfield Rifles (1932)
- Most titles: New Haven (4)

The Eastern League was a Minor League Baseball sports league that operated from 1916 through mid-season of 1932. The successor to an early 20th-century edition of the New England League, it was not related to two other like-named leagues: an earlier Eastern League founded in 1884 that was absorbed into the International League, and a later Eastern League that began as the New York–Pennsylvania League in 1923.

The Eastern League of 1916–1932 was a mid- or higher classification league, beginning in 1916 as a Class B circuit and upgraded to Class A in 1919. Its president, Tim Murnane, a former sportswriter, and many of its original member clubs were inherited from the New England League, which ceased operation in 1915. While most of its teams were centered in New England and upstate New York, in its later years the Eastern League admitted teams from Pennsylvania and Virginia. The league consisted of eight teams annually during its existence. The New Haven franchise, owned and operated by George Weiss during 1919–1929, won four of the league's 17 championships, although under multiple nicknames. Weiss would go on to a Baseball Hall of Fame career as a top executive with the New York Yankees.

This edition of the Eastern League collapsed during the nadir of the Great Depression on July 17, 1932.

== Member teams ==
- Albany, NY: Albany Senators 1920–1932 (Champions, 1927, 1929)
- Allentown, PA: Allentown Dukes 1929–1930 (Champions, 1930); Allentown Buffaloes 1931–1932
- Bridgeport, CT: Bridgeport Hustlers 1916; Bridgeport Americans 1917–1923; Bridgeport Bears 1924–1932
- Fitchburg, MA: Fitchburg Boosters 1922
- Hartford, CT: Hartford Senators 1916–1932 (Champions, 1923, 1931)
- Lawrence, MA: Lawrence Barristers 1916–1917
- Lowell, MA: Lowell Grays 1916
- Lynn, MA: Lynn Pipers 1916
- New Haven, CT: New Haven Merlins 1916–1918 (Champions, 1917); New Haven Weissmen 1919–1920 (Champions, 1920); New Haven Indians 1921–1922 (Champions, 1922); New Haven Profs 1923–1930 (Champions, 1928); New Haven Bulldogs 1931–1932
- New London, CT: New London Planters 1916–1918 (Champions, 1916, 1918)
- Norfolk, VA: Norfolk Tars 1931–1932
- Pittsfield, MA: Pittsfield Hillies 1919–1930 (Champions, 1919, 1921)
- Portland, ME: Portland Duffs 1916; Portland Paramounts 1917
- Providence, RI: Providence Grays 1918–1919, 1927–1930; Providence Rubes 1926 (Champions, 1926)
- Richmond, VA: Richmond Byrds 1931; Richmond Colts 1932
- Springfield, MA: Springfield Green Sox 1917; Springfield Ponies 1916, 1918–1921, 1923–1931; Springfield Rifles 1932 (Champions, 1932)
- Waterbury, CT: Waterbury Nattatucks 1918–1919; Waterbury Brasscos 1920–1928 (Champions, 1924–1925)
- Worcester, MA: Worcester Busters 1916–1917; Worcester Boosters 1918–1921, 1922; Worcester Panthers 1923–1925
