= John O'Rourke (baseball) =

American baseball player (1849–1911)

- Outfielder
- Born: August 23, 1849; Bridgeport, Connecticut, U.S.
- Died: June 23, 1911 (aged 61); Boston, Massachusetts, U.S.
- Batted: Left Threw: Left

MLB debut
- May 1, 1879, for the Boston Red Caps

Last MLB appearance
- September 10, 1883, for the New York Metropolitans

MLB statistics
- Batting average: .295
- Home runs: 11
- Runs batted in: 98
- Stats at Baseball Reference

Teams
- Boston Red Caps (1879–1880); New York Metropolitans (1883)

Career highlights and awards
- NL RBI leader (1879)

John W. O'Rourke (August 23, 1849 – June 23, 1911) was an American 19th-century baseball player. Between 1879 and 1883, he played in the National League with the Boston Red Caps (1879–1880) and in the American Association for the New York Metropolitans (1883). A center fielder, O'Rourke batted and threw left-handed. He was born in Bridgeport, Connecticut. O'Rourke was the older brother of Jim O'Rourke, another major league baseball player and a member of the Baseball Hall of Fame.

In a three-season career, O'Rourke posted a .295 batting average with 11 home runs and 98 RBI in 230 games.

O'Rourke died in Boston, Massachusetts, at age 61.

== Best season ==
- 1879 – Led National League in slugging percentage (.521) and RBI (62), and finished fourth in the batting race with a .341 BA behind Paul Hines (.357), his younger brother Jim O'Rourke (.348), and King Kelly (.348).

== See also ==
- List of Major League Baseball annual runs batted in leaders

== Sources ==
- Baseball Almanac
- Baseball Library
- Career statistics from Baseball Reference · Retrosheet · Baseball Almanac
- Jim Baseball at the Wayback Machine (archived May 20, 2004)
