= Jim O'Rourke (baseball) =

American baseball player (1850–1919)

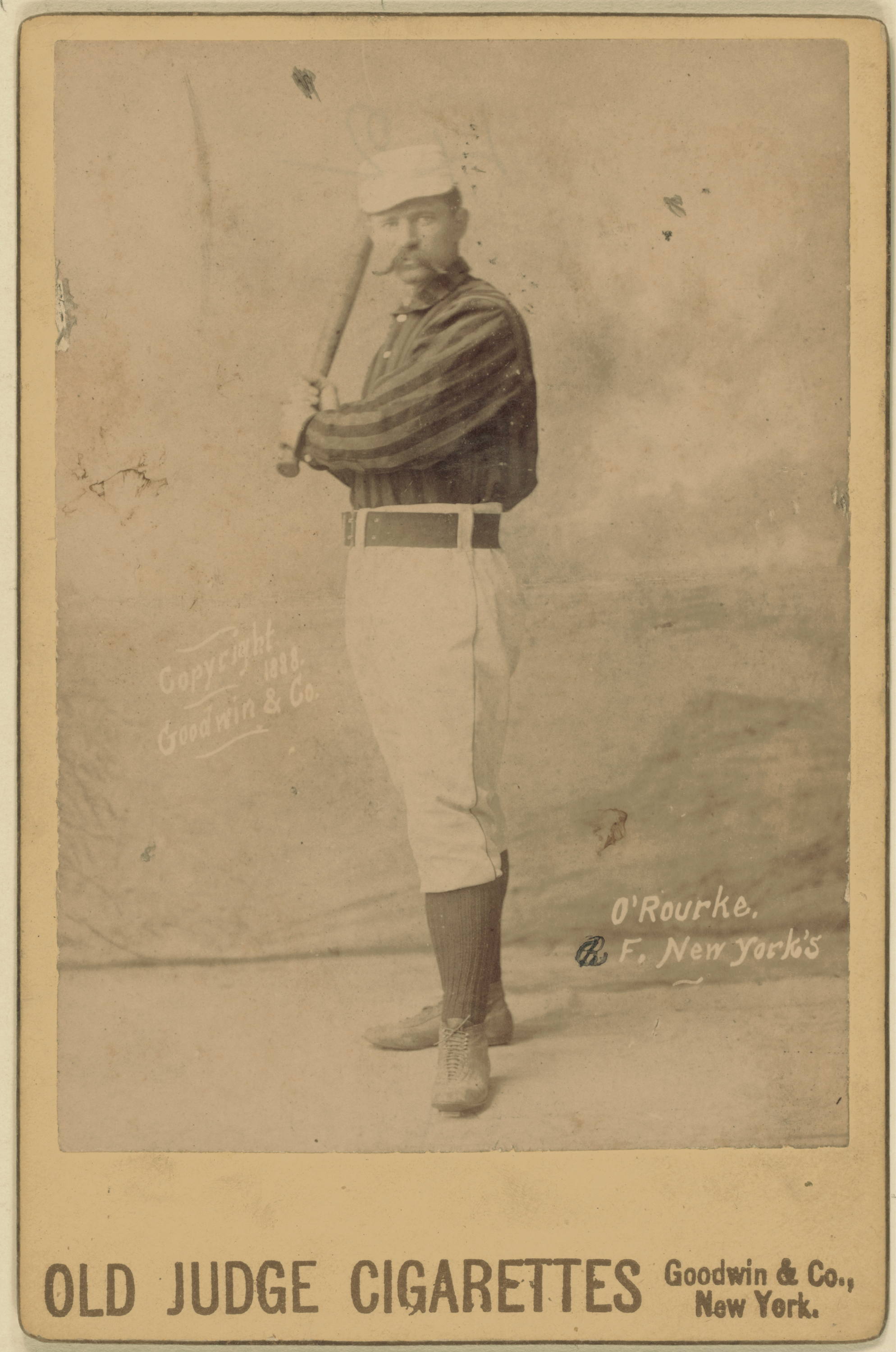
- O'Rourke in 1888
- Outfielder
- Born: September 1, 1850; Bridgeport, Connecticut, U.S.
- Died: January 8, 1919 (aged 68); Bridgeport, Connecticut, U.S.
- Batted: Right Threw: Right

Major league debut
- April 26, 1872, for the Middletown Mansfields

Last major league appearance
- September 22, 1904, for the New York Giants

Major league statistics
- Batting average: .310
- Hits: 2,639
- Home runs: 62
- Runs batted in: 1,208
- Stats at Baseball Reference

Teams
- As player: Middletown Mansfields (1872); Boston Red Stockings / Red Caps (1873–1878); Providence Grays (1879); Boston Red Caps (1880); Buffalo Bisons (1881–1884); New York Giants (1885–1889); New York Giants (PL) (1890); New York Giants (1891–1892); Washington Senators (1893); New York Giants (1904); As manager: Buffalo Bisons (1881–1884); Washington Senators (1893)

Career highlights and awards
- NL home run leader (1880)

Member of the National

Baseball Hall of Fame
- Induction: 1945
- Election method: Old-Timers Committee

James Henry O'Rourke (September 1, 1850 – January 8, 1919), nicknamed "Orator Jim", was an American professional baseball player in the National Association, the National League, and the Players' League who played primarily as a left fielder. A reliable hitter for two decades, O'Rourke was part of eight pennant winning teams (three National Association, five National League) for three different teams. For the period 1876 to 1892, he ranks behind only Cap Anson in career major league games played (1,644), hits (2,146), at-bats (6,884), doubles (392) and total bases (2,936), and behind only Harry Stovey in runs scored (1,370). (Note: Stovey was a younger player; Anson played five seasons and O'Rourke four prior to 1876.) In 1945, O'Rourke was inducted into the National Baseball Hall of Fame.

== Biography ==
O'Rourke was born in East Bridgeport, Connecticut, and worked on his family's farm while playing youth league and semi-pro baseball. He began his professional career as a member of the Middletown Mansfields in 1872, joining the one-year-old National Association team as a catcher. The Mansfields were not a top-tier team, and folded in August, but O'Rourke had impressed other teams sufficiently enough to be offered a contract with the Boston Red Stockings, with whom he played until 1878. On April 22, 1876, O'Rourke had the first base hit in National League history.

He graduated from Yale Law School in 1887 with an LL.B., practicing law in Bridgeport between early playing stints, and earning the nickname "Orator Jim" because of his verbosity on the field, his intellect, and his law degree—uncommon in a game regarded as a rough immigrant sport at the time.

After leaving the major leagues following the 1893 season he continued to play in the minor leagues until he was over 50 years old. Returning to Bridgeport fulltime, O’Rourke helped organize the Connecticut State League in 1895, serving as league official, team owner, manager, and player. As a direct result Bridgeport retained a professional baseball team for over a third of a century. Proximity to Yale allowed Jim to umpire Ivy League ball games and he also devoted his expertise to consulting baseball hierarchy at the national level. Jim is credited with signing Harry Herbert in 1895, Bridgeport’s first African American to play pro ball.

In 1904, he made a final appearance with the New York Giants under manager and friend John McGraw, doing so on September 22. At age 54, he became the oldest player ever to appear in the National League, and the oldest player to hit safely in a major league game; he went 1-for-4 in the game, with the Giants defeating the Cincinnati Reds. O'Rourke is one of only 29 players in baseball history to appear in Major League games in four decades.

In 1912, he returned to the field to catch a complete minor league game at the age of 60.

O'Rourke died of pneumonia at age 68 in Bridgeport, Connecticut. He was elected to the Baseball Hall of Fame in 1945 as one of the earliest inductees from the 19th century. His older brother John O'Rourke and his son Jimmy O'Rourke also played in the majors.

One legend concerning O'Rourke is that he was asked to drop the "O'" from his last name when he signed a contract with Boston and its Protestant backers. The son of Irish immigrants and the husband of a woman born in Ireland, O'Rourke refused, saying "I would rather die than give up my father's name. A million dollars would not tempt me."

Another legend about O'Rourke is that his signing by the Mansfields in 1872 was conditioned on the team finding someone to take over O'Rourke's chores on his parents' farm.

O'Rourke has made a brilliant record for himself as an outfielder, being an excellent judge of a ball, a swift runner, and making the most difficult running catches with the utmost ease and certainty. As a thrower, too, he stands pre-eminent, being credited with a throw of 365 feet, the next to the longest yet accomplished by any player.

— The Sporting Life

== Career statistics ==
In 1,999 games over 23 seasons, O'Rourke posted a .310 batting average (2,639-for-8,503) with 1,729 runs, 468 doubles, 149 triples, 62 home runs, 1,208 RBI, 229 stolen bases, 513 bases on balls, .352 on-base percentage and .422 slugging percentage.

== See also ==
- List of Major League Baseball career hits leaders
- List of Major League Baseball career doubles leaders
- List of Major League Baseball career triples leaders
- List of Major League Baseball career runs scored leaders
- List of Major League Baseball career runs batted in leaders
- List of Major League Baseball career stolen bases leaders
- List of Major League Baseball players to hit for the cycle
- List of Major League Baseball annual home run leaders
- List of Major League Baseball annual runs scored leaders
- List of Major League Baseball annual triples leaders
- List of Major League Baseball player-managers
- List of oldest Major League Baseball players
- List of Major League Baseball players who played in four decades

== Notes ==
Achievements
Preceded by John Reilly	Hitting for the cycle June 16, 1884	Succeeded by Dave Orr
Preceded by Charley Jones	Career home run record holder 1882	Succeeded by Charley Jones
