= Newfield Park, Bridgeport =

Outdoor park in Bridgeport, Connecticut

Newfield Park
- Interactive map of Newfield Park
- Location: Bridgeport, Connecticut
- Coordinates: 41.17300°N 73.17000°W

Newfield Park is an outdoor park located in Bridgeport, Connecticut. It is located in the east end of the city at 698 Seaview Avenue.

== Baseball ==
From 1902 to 1914, it was the home field of the Bridgeport Orators, a now defunct minor league baseball team that played in the Connecticut League.

On Sunday, April 28, 1918, the Boston Red Sox defeated the Bridgeport All-Stars in an exhibition game.

On August 4, 1930, Bridgeport's first night baseball game was played at Newfield Park when the Bridgeport Bears faced the Springfield Ponies.

Newfield Park also was the home of the San Francisco Giants' 1932 AA affiliate, the Eastern League Bridgeport Bees.

== See also ==
- History of Bridgeport, Connecticut
