= Waterbury Indians (baseball) =

- 1897–1986; (1897, 1947–1950, 1966–1971, 1973–1986); Waterbury, Connecticut

Minor league affiliations
- Class: Class B (1947–1950); Class AA (1966–1971, 1973–1986)
- League: Colonial League (1947–1950) Eastern League (1966–1971, 1973–1986)

Major league affiliations
- Team: San Francisco Giants (1966–1967); Cleveland Indians (1968–1969); Pittsburgh Pirates (1970-1971); Los Angeles Dodgers (1973–1976); San Francisco Giants (1977–1978); Oakland Athletics (1979); Cincinnati Reds (1980–1983); California Angels (1984); Cleveland Indians (1985–1986)

Minor league titles
- League titles (1): 1970
- Conference titles (1): 1947
- Wild card berths (5): 1948; 1949; 1980; 1984; 1985

Team data
- Name: Waterbury Indians (1897); Waterbury Timers (1947–1950); Waterbury Giants (1966–1967); Waterbury Indians (1968–1969); Waterbury Pirates (1970–1971); Waterbury Dodgers (1973–1976); Waterbury Giants (1977–1978); Waterbury A's (1979); Waterbury Reds (1980–1983); Waterbury Angels (1984); Waterbury Indians (1985–1986)
- Ballpark: Municipal Stadium (1947–1950, 1966–1986)

The Waterbury Indians were a minor league team based in Waterbury, Connecticut. Waterbury hosted minor league baseball beginning in 1884, with teams playing under numerous nicknames. The Waterbury team was first called the "Indians" in the 1897 season. The nickname returned in 1968, as the "Waterbury Indians" of the Class AA level Eastern League played on two occasions, with the franchise twice serving as a minor league affiliate of the Cleveland Indians.

Prior to the Eastern League era, the "Waterbury Timers" played as members of the Class B level Colonial League from 1947 to 1950.

From 1966 to 1986, Waterbury had tenure of hosting teams as members of the Class AA level Eastern League. Waterbury Eastern League teams adopted the nicknames of their various major league affiliates. The Waterbury teams played as a minor league affiliate of the San Francisco Giants (1966–1967), Cleveland Indians (1968–1969), Pittsburgh Pirates (1970–1971), Los Angeles Dodgers (1973–1976), San Francisco Giants (1977–1978), Oakland Athletics (1979), Cincinnati Reds (1980–1983), California Angels (1984) and Cleveland Indians (1985–1986) during their tenure in the league. The 1970 Waterbury Pirates team won the Eastern League championship.

Beginning with the 1947 season, all subsequent Waterbury minor league teams hosted home games at Municipal Stadium. The ballpark is still in use today.

Baseball Hall of Fame member Roger Connor was the player/manager of the 1897 Waterbury Indians. Fellow hall of fame member Dave Parker played for the 1971 Waterbury Pirates.

== History ==
=== Early minor league teams ===
Waterbury first hosted minor league baseball in 1884, when the "Waterbury" team began a tenure of Waterbury teams that played primarily in the Connecticut State League between 1884 and 1912.

The Waterbury team was first known as the "Indians" in 1897, playing the season as members of the Connecticut State League. After serving as player/manager of the St Louis Browns (today's St. Louis Cardinals) in 1896, in his final major league season, Baseball Hall of Fame member Roger Connor managed the 1897 Waterbury Indians for the final portion of their 1897 season, beginning a tenure with the franchise. Connor was a Waterbury native. Connor remained with Waterbury as their manager for the 1898 season, when the team became known as the Waterbury Pirates and won the Connecticut State League championship, with his brother Joe Connor in the roster. Connor would manage Waterbury through the 1901 Connecticut State League season.

The Waterbury Nattatucks and Waterbury Brasscos teams played as members of the Eastern League from 1918 to 1928. The 1928 Brasscos were the last minor league team before the 1947 Waterbury "Timers" team resumed minor league play.

=== 1947 to 1950: Waterbury Timers - Colonial League ===
After an eighteen-season hiatus, Waterbury resumed minor league play in 1947, when the Waterbury "Timers" began play in the reformed six-team, Class B level Colonial League. The Timers began playing minor league home games at Municipal Stadium, which would host all Waterbury minor league teams through 1986. In the era, the Class B minor league level was the equivalent of today's Class AA level minor leagues. The Bridgeport Bees, New London Raiders, Port Chester Clippers, Poughkeepsie Giants and Stamford Bombers teams joined with Waterbury to begin Colonial League play in on May 7, 1947.

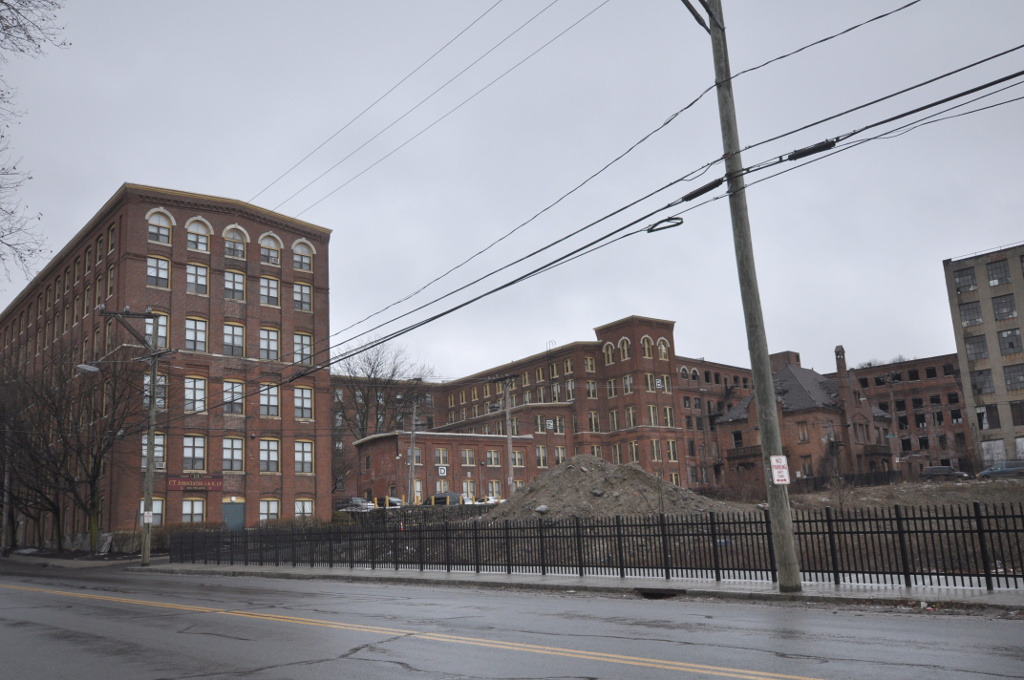
(2018) Former Waterbury Clock Company complex. Waterbury, Connecticut. National Register of Historic Places.

The Waterbury "Timers" nickname corresponds to local history and local industry in the era. The Waterbury Clock Company was based in Waterbury from 1894 through 1944. The company was later purchased and moved to Middlebury, Connecticut and evolved to become known as the Timex Corporation.

In their first season of Colonial League play, the 1947 Waterbury Timers won the league pennant. Waterbury ended the regular season with an 83–38 record and a first-place finish, playing the season under manager James Acton. Waterbury finished 14½ games ahead of the second place Poughkeepsie Giants in the final regular season standings. After winning the Colonial League pennant, the Timers lost in the first round of the four-team playoffs 4 games to 3 to eventual the champion Samford Bombers. Waterbury's Frank Lamanna led the Colonial League with both 21 home runs and 123 RBI. Pitcher Mike Kash of Waterbury won 20 games to lead the league.

The 1948 season saw the Timers continue Colonial League play and end the regular season in third place and qualify for the playoffs. Waterbury ended the season with a 65–68 record, playing the season under player/manager Mike Kash. The Timers finished 18.0 games behind the first place Port Chester Clippers in the final regular season standings. In the four-team playoffs, Waterbury lost in first round of the playoffs 4 games to 1 to eventual champion Port Chester. Waterbury's Aldo Casadei led the Colonial League with 157 total hits.

Bert Shepard was named as the Waterbury manager in 1949. Shepard took the position, stating he wanted to manage because, "Always before I’ve had a manager who was afraid to take a chance on me. Now, it’s up to me. Every fourth day when I make up the lineups, that ninth man is going to be B. Shepard, pitcher."

A rising minor league player, Shepard had returned to baseball after suffering major injuries while serving in World War II. Shepard was as a pilot for the U.S. Army 55th Fighter Group. On May 21, 1944, Shephard was piloting a Lockheed P-38 Lightning fighter plane while returning from a mission over Hamburg, Germany, when his plane was shot down by enemy gunfire. The gunfire hit and pierced Shephard's right leg and foot and also his chin, rendering him unconscious as his plane crashed. After his plane crashed, the injured Shephard was captured by German troops who held off German citizens intent on killing Shepard. Doctors at the Meiningen Prisoner-of-war camp amputated his injured right leg and he remained a POW after the surgery to remove his leg.

In February 1945, Shephard was returned to the United States after a prisoner exchange. With his injuries, he was sent to Walter Reed Army Medical Center. There, Shepard was fitted with a new prosthesis. With the prosthesis, Shephard eventually began pitching again and returned to baseball. On July 10, 1945, Shapard was the starting pitcher for the Washington Senators against the Brooklyn Dodgers in an exhibition contest. On August 4, 1945, Shepard became the only major league player to play with a prosthetic leg when he pitched a perfect inning of relief for the Senators in a game against the Boston Red Sox/

In the winter of 1949, Shepard again was at Walter Reed Hospital. He had surgery where a portion of his leg had been re-amputated, the fifth time the leg had required such a surgery. While in the hospital recovering, Shepard saw an ad in The Sporting News for the managerial position with the Waterbury Timers. He submitted his application in the mail from the hospital and was hired by Waterbury.

Waterbury continued Colonial League play in 1949 and ended their regular season with a final record of 62–63. The Timers finished in fourth place, playing under managers Bert Shepard and Leo Eastham amidst controversy. The Timers had compiled a record of 42–46 when a managerial situation became an issue. Upon joining Waterbury as player/manager, Shepard had suggested to be paid a salary of $1 for the entire season, with the stipulation he receive $400 for each pitching victory he earned as a pitcher. This would cause controversy during the season, as Shepard eventually agreed to a salary of between $4,000 and $4,500 for the season. In August, the franchise claimed it could no longer afford his salary and Shepard was removed as manager. Player Leo Eastham compiled a record of 5–4 in his absence. The Waterbury players threatened to go on strike after Shepard's removal and wanted him reinstated. The situation was settled when a player's committee raised enough money from local merchants to pay Shepard to return as manager for the rest of the season.

Bert Shepard then returned to manage Waterbury for a 15–13 record to conclude the season. Ultimately, Waterbury ended the season 18.0 games behind first place Bristol in the final regular season standings. As a pitcher, Bert Shepard compiled a 5–6 record with a 6.16 ERA. With their fourth-place finish, Waterbury qualified for the four-team playoffs. The Timers lost in first round 4 games to 1 to eventual champion Bristol. Player and briefly manager Leo Eastham led the Colonial League with 26 home runs.

Shepard worked for IBM Typewriters in 1950 and 1951, before returning to pitching in 1952, playing through 1955. After his baseball career ended, Shepard married, became an engineer and won the national amputee golf championship twice.

The Waterbury Timers played their final season in 1950, as the Colonial League folded during the season. The 1950 season was short, as the Class B level Colonial League disbanded on July 16, 1950. The Timers had compiled a record of 23–39 and were in fifth place when the league folded. Waterbury was managed by John Morris (13–16), John McKenna and Charlie Bowles in the shortened season. At the time the Colonial League folded, the Timers finished 16½ games behind Poughkeepsie in the final standings. The Colonial League never reformed and Waterbury was without a minor league team for over a decade.

=== 1966 to 1971: Eastern League membership ===
After a sixteen-season hiatus from professional baseball, Waterbury next hosted minor league baseball in 1966, when the Waterbury "Giants" became members of the six-team Class AA level Eastern League. The "Giants" were so named as Waterbury served as a minor league affiliate of the San Francisco Giants. The newly formed Waterbury franchise replaced the Springfield Giants in the six-team league, as the San Francisco Giants' affiliate was relocated. The Waterbury Giants joined the Elmira Pioneers (Baltimore Orioles affiliate), Pawtucket Indians (Cleveland Indians), Pittsfield Red Sox (Boston Red Sox), Williamsport Mets (New York Mets) and York White Roses (Washington Senators) teams in beginning Eastern League play on April 23, 1966. The Waterbury Giants resumed play at Municipal Stadium, which would host Eastern League teams for the duration of the franchise.

In returning to minor league play, the Waterbury Giants ended the 1966 Eastern League regular season in fifth place. Waterbury finished with a record of 64–76, playing the season under manager Andy Gilbert. The Giants ended the season 24½ games behind the first place Elmira Pioneers. No playoffs were held in 1966. Robert Taylor of Waterbury led the league with 150 total hits.

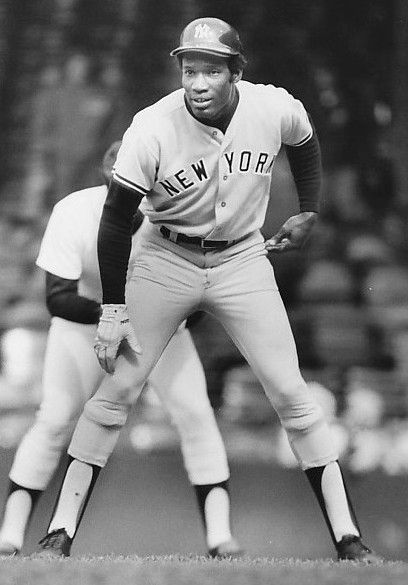
(1975) Bobby Bonds, New York Yankee. A future major league all-star, Bonds played for Waterbury in 1967.

The 1967 Waterbury Giants continued play as the Eastern League expanded to become an eight-team league with two four-team divisions. Waterbury became a member of the East Division record of 71–69 fifth place under overall returning manager Andy Gilbert. The Giants placed third in the East Division, finishing 11.0 games behind the division champion Binghamton Triplets. Waterbury did not qualify for the two-team playoff won by Binghamton over the Elmira Pioneers. Bobby Bonds played for the 1967 Waterbury Giants in his second professional season after almost quitting baseball the season before. Bonds played in 137 games for Waterbury, hitting .261 with 15 home runs and 24 stolen bases. He would make his major league debut with the San Francisco Giants in 1968.

The 1968 Waterbury "Indians" continued Eastern League play as the franchise became a minor league affiliate of the Cleveland Indians. The Eastern League dropped the Pawtucket Indians and Williamsport Mets franchises and returned to playing as a six-team Class AA level league.

With the new structure, Waterbury ended the 1968 season in last place. The Indians ended the regular season with a record of 52–88. Waterbury finished in sixth place, playing the season under managers Phil Cavarretta (19–38) and Ray Mueller (33–50) and finished 32½ games behind the first place Pittsfield Red Sox. Waterbury did not qualify for the four-team playoffs, won by the Reading Phillies. Waterbury Indians pitcher Mike Hedlund led the Eastern League with 149 strikeouts. Following the 1968 season, Waterbury owner Jerry Waring sold the Waterbury franchise to Bernie Durocher, nephew of Baseball Hall of Fame manager Leo Durocher.

The 1969 Waterbury Indians finished in last place in the six-team Class AA Eastern League regular season standings. Waterbury ended the regular season with a 48–93 record, finishing in sixth place while playing under manager Clay Bryant. The Indians finished 42.0 gamed behind the first place York Pirates and did not qualify for the four-team playoffs, which were cancelled after one game and the York Pirates being declared champions. Waterbury drew 37.371 fans for the season, lowest in the league. In the 1969 season, Waterbury and Elmira played an extra game against each other by accident.

In 1970, the Waterbury "Pirates" continued Eastern League play as a minor league affiliate of the Pittsburgh Pirates and won the league championship. The newly named Pirates ended the 1970 season with a record of 79–62, finishing in first place, while playing under manager Red Davis. Waterbury ended the season a mere 1.0 game ahead of the second place Reading Phillies (78–63) in the final standings of the six-team league. No playoffs were held and Waterbury won the league championship finishing by in first place. Red Davis was named as Eastern League Manager of the Year. Gene Clines and Richie Zisk were key players on the Pirates championship team. Zisk later became an All-Star player and led the American League in home runs. Clines had a long major league career and was a long-time hitting coach for the Seattle Mariners.

In defending their championship, the Waterbury Pirates ended the 1971 Eastern League season out of the playoffs. The Pirates ended the regular season with a record of 68–70, finishing in fifth place overall and in third place in the four-team National Division. The Pirates played the season under returning manager Red Davis. Waterbury did not qualify for the playoffs as the Eastern League expanded to eight teams and two divisions. The Pirates finished 10.0 games behind the division champion Trois-Rivieres Aigles.

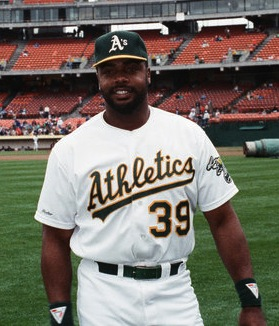
(1989) Dave Parker, Oakland Athletics. A member of the Baseball Hall of Fame, Parker played for Waterbury in 1971 at age 19.

Baseball Hall of Fame member Dave Parker played for the Pirates in 1971 at age 20, having played the previous season with the Pirates team in the Rookie level Gulf Coast League to begin his professional career at age 19. Still at 19 years old, Parker began his second professional season with Waterbury and struggled, as he hit .228 with 0 home runs in 30 games at Waterbury to begin the season. Turning age 20, Parker was then sent to the Class A level Monroe Pirates, hitting .358 with 11 home runs in 71 games with Monroe in the Western Carolinas League to finish the season. Of his time with Waterbury in 1971, Parker said, "I was the youngest guy there and I tried too hard to prove myself." In 1972, Parker was promoted to the Salem Pirates and won the Carolina League Most Valuable Player Award. Parker became the National league MVP in 1979 with the Pittsburgh Pirates and won two batting titles in his major league career. He retired with a .290 batting average with HR and RBI.

=== 1972 Eastern League season: Elmira flooding ===
The Waterbury franchise folded following the 1971 season. Waterbury did not host an Eastern League team at the start of the 1972 season, replaced in the league by the Sherbrooke Pirates, as the Pittsburgh Pirates relocated their affiliate team to a new locale.

On June 22 and June 23, 1972, heavy rains caused major flooding in Elmira, New York and left Dunn Field, the home ballpark of the Elmira Pioneers franchise, under water and unusable. The floods forced Elmira to relocate some "home games" and without a minor league tenant for the Eastern League season, Municipal Stadium in Waterbury was utilized. Elmira was eventually able to resume play at Dunn Field in Elmira on July 18, 1972, after the waters receded and their home ballpark was repaired. The team ended the season with a record of 46–91, finishing in fourth place in the American Division and ending the season 36½ games behind the first place West Haven Yankees. Overall, their record was the worst in the eight-team league, while playing the unique season under the direction of manager Len Johnson. The Elmira Pioneers played as a minor league affiliate of the Cleveland Indians in 1972.

=== 1973 to 1976 - Dodgers & Eastern League ===
In 1973, Waterbury regained a franchise in the Eastern League. The newly formed Waterbury "Dodgers" resumed play in the eight-team, Class AA level league. Waterbury resumed league play as a minor league affiliate of the Los Angeles Dodgers. The Waterbury Dodgers joined the Bristol Red Sox (Boston Red Sox affiliate), Pittsfield Rangers (Texas Rangers), Quebec Carnavals (Montreal Expos), Reading Phillies (Philadelphia Phillies), Sherbrooke Pirates (Pittsburgh Pirates), Trois Rivieres Aigles (Cincinnati Reds) and West Haven Yankees (New York Yankees) teams in beginning Eastern League play on April 21, 1973.

The Dodgers ended the 1973 Eastern League season in last place in the final regular season standings. With a final record of 59–79, Waterbury ended the season holding the worst record in the eight-team league. Waterbury manager Don LeJohn began a four-season tenure as the Waterbury Dodgers manager. The Dodgers ended the regular season in fourth place in the four-team American Division, finishing 17.0 games behind the division champion Pittsfield Rangers in the final standings. With their last place finish, Waterbury did not qualify for the playoff final won by the Reading Phillies over Pittsfield.

Continuing play in the 1974 Eastern League, the Waterbury Dodgers were improved. After a last place finish the season before, Waterbury ended the regular season with a final record of 64–72, placing third in the four-team American Division, finishing 10.5 games behind the division champion Bristol Red Sox. Waterbury played the season under returning manager Don LeJohn and did not qualify for the four-team playoffs won by the Thetford Mines Pirates. Future major league manager Terry Collins played for Waterbury at age 25, hitting .200.

For the 1975 season the Eastern League remained an eight-team league but had eliminated the division structure and went to a split season format. The Dodgers continued play and ended the season in third place. Waterbury ended the regular season with an overall record of 77–59, finishing 6.0 games behind first place Reading Phillies in the final overall standings. Playing under returning manager Don LeJohn, Waterbury did not qualify for the final, where the Bristol Red Sox defeated Reading. Prior to meeting in the final, Bristol won the second half of the split season schedule and Reading won the first half title. Bristol finished in second place in the overall standings, 3.0 games ahead of Waterbury.

The 1976 Eastern League returned to four team divisions, remaining as an eight-team Class AA level league. Waterbury played their final season as a Los Angeles Dodgers affiliate. Playing again under manager Don LeJohn, the Waterbury Dodgers ended the season in fourth place in the four-team north Division. The Dodgers needed the season with a record of 62–73 record in finishing 19½ games behind division winner Trois Rivieres Aigles. Waterbury did not qualify for the playoff won by the West Haven Yankees.

Both playing at age 20, the 1981 World Series Most Valuable Player Pedro Guerrero and 1979 NL Rookie of the year and 1984 NL Cy Young Award winner Rick Sutcliffe played for the 1976 Waterbury Dodgers. After pitching the season for Waterbury, Sutcliffe was called up to the Los Angeles Dodgers, making his major league debut on September 29, 1976. Future major league managers Jim Riggleman and Ron Washington also played for the 1976 Waterbury Dodgers.

=== 1977 to 1979: Waterbury Giants & Waterbury A's ===
Beginning in 1977, the Waterbury franchise changed affiliates and began play as the Waterbury "Giants." The Giants continued play as members of the Class AA level Eastern League, becoming a minor league affiliate of the San Francisco Giants,

The 1977 Eastern League played with two divisions and Waterbury became a member of the four-team New England Division. The other division was the Can-Am Division, The Giants ended the regular season with a record of 77–63 with the third best league record under manager Andy Gilbert, who returned to Waterbury having managed the previous Waterbury Giants teams. In their division, the Giants ended the season in second place, finishing 10.0 games behind the division champion West Haven Yankees. The Waterbury Giants did not qualify Andy Gilbert was named as co-Eastern League Manager of the Year and Waterbury pitcher Alan Wirth led the league with 149 strikeouts.

For the 1978 Eastern League season, the Waterbury Giants continued play as the league reduced to a six-team Class AA league with no divisions and no Canadian teams. The league adopted a split season schedule. The Giants ended the season in fourth place overall, ending the regular season with a record of 65–74 playing the season under returning manager Andy Gilbert. Waterbury finished 17.0 games behind the first place West Haven Yankees. The Giants did not qualify for the playoffs as the Bristol Red Sox won the first half and the Reading Phillier won the second half of the split season format, with Briston winning the playoff between the two teams.

In 1979, Waterbury again changed affiliates as the Waterbury "A's" continued Eastern League play as an Oakland A's minor league affiliate for one season. The Eastern League continued play as a six-team class D level league. Waterbury finished in last place. The A's ended the 1979 regular season with a 79–91 record and in sixth place under manager Ed Nottle. Waterbury finished 34.5 games behind he first place West Haven Yankees. No playoff was held, as the Eastern League continued with a split season schedule and West Haven had the best record in both of the half-seasons.

=== 1980 to 1983: Waterbury Reds ===
In 1980, the Eastern League remained as a Class AA level league and expanded to once again become an eight-team league, adding the Lynn Sailors and Glens Falls White Sox franchises. The Oakland A's league affiliation switched to the West Haven White Caps and Waterbury became a Cincinnati Reds minor league affiliate.

The newly named Waterbury "Reds" played the 1980 Eastern League season as members of the South Division, adopting the Cincinnati Reds parent team nickname while qualifying for the playoffs in the newly structured league. The Waterbury Reds ended the regular season with a 75–64 record, fourth best overall in the league, playing the season under manager Mike Compton. The Reds ended the season in third place in the South Division and finished 5.0 games behind the division champion Bristol Red Sox. The Reds advanced to the four-team playoffs. Waterbury advanced to the finals after defeating Reading the Phillies 2 games to 0 in their first-round playoff series. In the playoff final, the Holyoke Millers defeated Waterbury 2 games to 1. Nick Esasky of Waterbury hit 30 home runs to lead the Eastern League. Esasky later had his major league playing career end prematurely due to vertigo.

After advancing to the Eastern League playoff finals in the previous season, the Waterbury Reds had a last place finish in the 1981 Eastern League season. The Reds ended the regular season with a final record of 55–83 and finished in fourth place in the four-team Southern Division. Playing the season under manager George Scherger, Waterbury finished 24½ games behind the division winner Bristol Red Sox. Overall, Waterbury had the worst regular season in the eight-team league. With their last place finish, the Reds did not qualify for the four team playoffs, eventually won by Bristol over the Glens Falls White Sox.

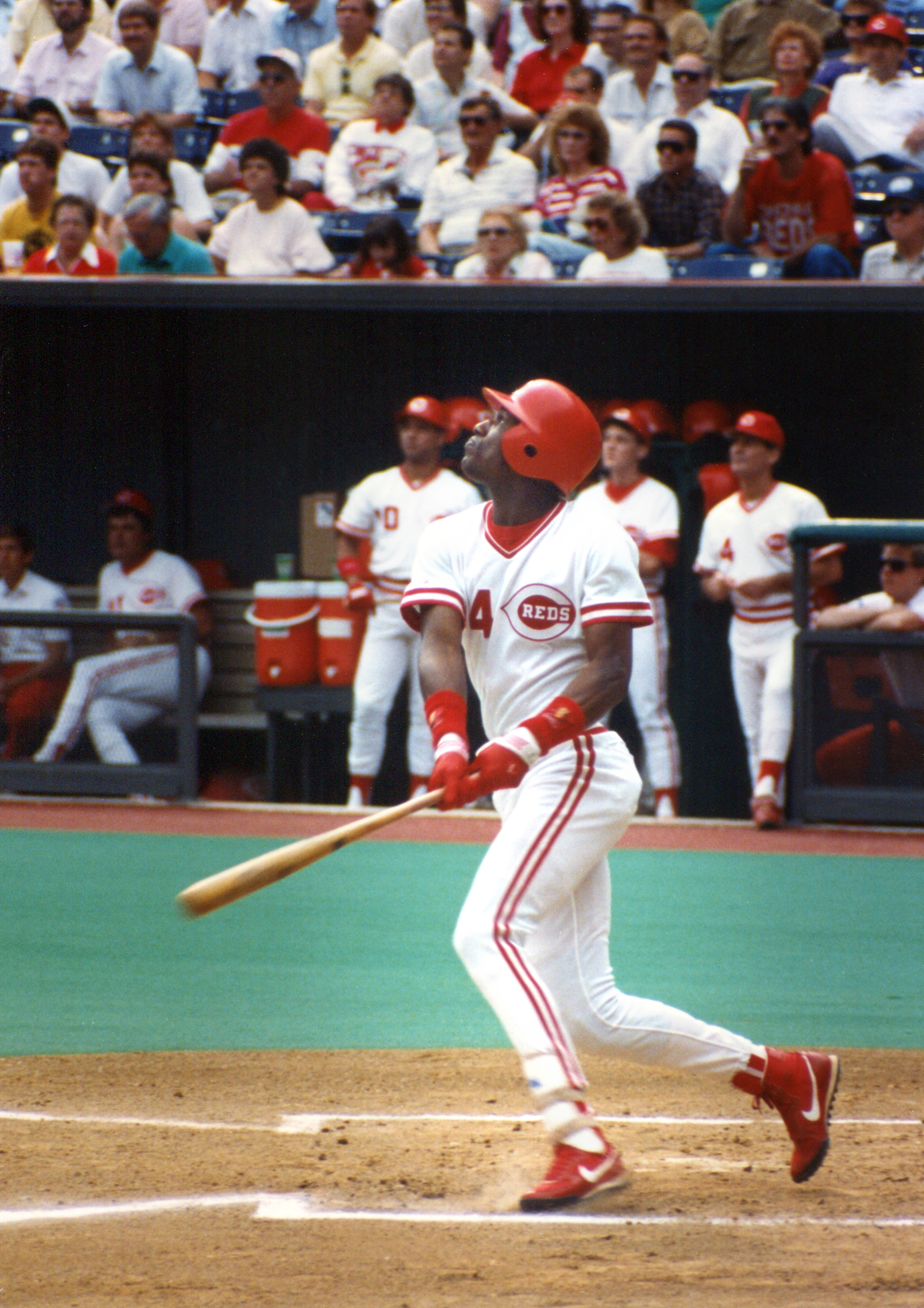
(199) Eric Davis, Cincinnati Reds. A future major league all-star, Davis played for the 1983 Waterbury Reds, hitting 15 home runs with 39 stolen bases.

After finishing in last place the previous season, the Waterbury Reds improved slightly in the Class AA level 1982 Eastern League final standings. The Reds ended the 1982 season in seventh place overall in the eight-team league. With record of 56–82, Waterbury was managed by Jim Lett. The Waterbury Reds placed fourth in the four-team South Division, finishing 29.0 games behind the division winner West Haven A's. Waterbury did not qualify for the playoffs won by West Haven over the Lynn Sailors in the finals.

In the 1983 Eastern League season, the league remained as an eight-team Class AA level league, but did not retain the two division structure in 1983, The top four teams in the final standings qualified for the playoffs. The Waterbury Reds remained as an affiliate of the Cincinnati Reds and ended the season in seventh place with a record of 59–80, playing the season under returning manager Jim Lett. The Reds finished 36½ games behind the first place Reading Phillies in the final regular season standings. The Reds Did not qualify for the four-team playoffs won by the New Britain Red Sox over the Lynn Pirates in the final.

Future Cincinnati Reds All-Star player Eric Davis played for Waterbury in 1983. At age 21, Davis hit .290, with 15 home runs and 39 stolen bases in 89 games for the Reds. Davis played alongside Paul O'Neill with Waterbury. Promoted to Waterbury for 14 games in 1983, O'Neill became a five-time MLB All-Star player who won the 1990 NL batting championship and was on the multiple World Series championship teams with the New York Yankees after playing for 1990 World Series champion Cincinnati Reds. O'Neill's uniform number 21 is retired by the Yankees.

=== 1984 to 1986: Waterbury Angels & Waterbury Indians ===
In 1984, the Waterbury "Angels" continued Eastern League play, as the franchise became a California Angels minor league affiliate, an agreement that lasted for one season. This shift in affiliation occurred when the Cincinnati Reds' affiliation was transferred from Waterbury to the newly formed Vermont Reds. The Eastern League member Lynn Pirates franchise had relocated from Lynn, Massachusetts to Burlington, Vermont. The newly established Vermont franchise then reached a four-year affiliate agreement with the Cincinnati Reds.

In the 1984 Eastern League season, the newly named Waterbury Angels ended the season with a final record 76–64 and qualified for the playoffs, advancing to the league finals. Waterbury finished second place tie in the regular season, playing under manager Winston Llenas. Waterbury ended the regular season in a second-place tie with the Glens Falls White Sox, with both teams finishing 6.0 games behind the first place Albany-Colonie A's. Qualifying for the four-team playoffs, the Waterbury Angels defeated Glens Falls White Sox 3 games to 1 in the first round to advance. Waterbury lost in the league Finals, where the Vermont Reds defeated the Angels 3 games to 2. Waterbury Angels pitcher Bob Bastian had 119 strikeouts to lead the Eastern League.

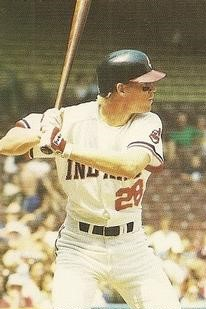
(1987) Cory Snyder, Cleveland Indians Snyder was the 1985 Eastern League Most Valuable Player playing for the Waterbury Indians.

The 1985 Waterbury "Indians" continued play in the Class AA level Eastern League, as the Waterbury franchise once again became a minor league affiliate of the Cleveland Indians after fifteen years. The Indians finished the 1985 Eastern League season with a record of 75–64 and ended the regular season in second place tie, playing the season under manager Jack Aker, qualifying for the four-team playoffs. Waterbury lost in first round 3 games to 1 to the New Britain Red Sox. Waterbury catcher Andy Allanson won the Eastern League batting title, hitting .312 to lead the league. Waterbury third basemen Cory Snyder was named Eastern League Most Valuable Player, after leading the Eastern League with both 28 home runs and 94 RBI. Snyder was a member of the 1984 Olympic Baseball representing the United States.

In their final season, the 1986 Waterbury Indians played the final season for the franchise as members of the Eastern League. As a minor league affiliate of the Cleveland Indians, Waterbury ended the season in fifth place in the eight-team Class AA level league. Ending the regular season with a record of 66–73, Waterbury did not qualify for the four-team playoffs, finishing the regular season fifth place, playing the season under manager Orlando Gomez. Waterbury ended the season 12½ games behind the first place Reading Phillies in the eight-team league. Waterbury did not qualify for the playoffs won by the Vermont Reds. Bernardo Brito of the Waterbury Indians led the Eastern League with 18 home runs.

The Waterbury franchise did not return to play in the 1987 Eastern League, replaced by the Williamsport Bills franchise, who became the Cleveland Indians affiliate.

=== 1997 Waterbury Spirit ===
Waterbury was without minor league baseball until 1997, when the Waterbury "Spirit" began play as members of the Independent Northeast League. The team played in Waterbury from the 1997 season through the 2000 season and hosted home games at Municipal Stadium, continuing the ballpark's history of hosting minor league teams in Waterbury. After folding in 2000, the franchise was reformed in 2003, but was relocated to Lynn, Massachusetts, where the team continued play as the North Shore Spirit from 2004 to 2007.

== The ballpark ==
Beginning with the 1947 season, Waterbury teams hosted home minor league games in Municipal Stadium, which was originally constructed in 1938 as a football facility. The site was first home to the privately owned Waterbury Driving Park, which also hosted baseball and other athletic activities including horse racing. The site became a public park and received a $400,000 upgrade in 1939, reamed to become Waterbury Municipal Stadium.

On August 7, 1947, the New York Yankees with Baseball Hall of Fame members Joe DiMaggio, Yogi Berra and Phil Rizzuto played an exhibition game against the Waterbury Timers at the ballpark. The ballpark is still in use today. Municipal Stadium is located at 1200 Watertown Avenue in Waterbury, Connecticut.

== Timeline ==
Year(s)	# Yrs.	Team	Level	League	Affiliate	Ballpark
1947–1950	4	Waterbury Timers	Class B	Colonial League	None	Municipal Stadium
1966–1967	2	Waterbury Giants	Class AA	Eastern League	San Francisco Giants	Municipal Stadium
1968–1969	2	Waterbury Indians	Class AA	Eastern League	Cleveland Indians	Municipal Stadium
1970–1971	2	Waterbury Pirates	Class AA	Eastern League	Pittsburgh Pirates	Municipal Stadium
1972	1	Elmira Pioneers*	Class AA	Eastern League	Cleveland Indians	Municipal Stadium
1973–1976	4	Waterbury Dodgers	Class AA	Eastern League	Los Angeles Dodgers	Municipal Stadium
1977–1978	2	Waterbury Giants	Class AA	Eastern League	San Francisco Giants	Municipal Stadium
1979	1	Waterbury A's	Class AA	Eastern League	Oakland Athletics	Municipal Stadium
1980–1983	4	Waterbury Reds	Class AA	Eastern League	Cincinnati Reds	Municipal Stadium
1984	1	Waterbury Angels	Class AA	Eastern League	California Angels	Municipal Stadium
1985–1986	2	Waterbury Indians	Class AA	Eastern League	Cleveland Indians	Municipal Stadium

== Year-by-year records ==
Year	Record	Finish	Manager	Playoffs/Notes
Waterbury Timers (Colonial League)
1947	83–38	1st	James Acton	Won League pennant Lost in 1st round
1948	65–68	3rd	Mike Kash	Lost in 1st round
1949	62–63	4th	Bert Shepard (42–46) / Leo Eastham (5–4); Bert Shepard (15–13)	Lost in 1st round
1950	23–39	5th	John Morris (13–16) / John McKenna; Charlie Bowles	League disbanded July 16
Waterbury Giants (Eastern League)
1966	64–76	5th	Andy Gilbert	No playoffs held
1967	71–69	5th	Andy Gilbert	Did not qualify
Waterbury Indians (Eastern League)
1968	52–88	6th	Phil Cavarretta (19–38) / Ray Mueller (33–50)	Did not qualify
1969	48–93	6th	Clay Bryant	Did not qualify
Waterbury Pirates (Eastern League)
1970	79–62	1st	Red Davis	No playoffs held Won league championship
1971	68–70	5th	Red Davis	Did not qualify
1972	46–91	8th	Len Johnson	*Elmira Pioneers franchise relocated to Waterbury due to flooding Did not qualify
Waterbury Dodgers (Eastern League)
1973	59–79	8th	Don LeJohn	Did not qualify
1974	64–72	6th (t)	Don LeJohn	Did not qualify
1975	77–59	3rd	Don LeJohn	Did not qualify
1976	62–73	6th	Don LeJohn	Did not qualify
Waterbury Giants (Eastern League)
1977	77–63	3rd	Andy Gilbert	Did not qualify
1978	65–74	4th	Andy Gilbert	Did not qualify
Waterbury A's (Eastern League)
1979	79–91	6th	Ed Nottle	Did not qualify
Waterbury Reds (Eastern League)
1980	75–64	4th	Mike Compton	Lost league finals
1981	55–83	8th	George Scherger	Did not qualify
1982	56–82	7th	Jim Lett	Did not qualify
1983	59–80	7th	Jim Lett	Did not qualify
Waterbury Angles (Eastern League)
1984	76–64	2nd (t)	Winston Llenas	Lost League Finals
Waterbury Indians (Eastern League)
1985	75–64	2nd (t)	Jack Aker	Lost in 1st round
1986	66–73	5th	Orlando Gomez	Did not qualify

== Notable alumni ==
- Roger Connor (1897–1898) Inducted Baseball Hall of Fame, 1976
- Dave Parker (1971) Elected Baseball Hall of Fame, 2025
- Ed Acosta (1970–1971)
- Jack Aker (1985, MGR)
- Andy Allanson (1985)
- Rod Allen (1986)
- Keith Atherton (1979)
- Orlando Álvarez (1973–1976)
- Rudy Arroyo (1973)
- Keith Atherton (1979)
- Rick Austin (1968)
- Shooty Babitt (1979)
- Jose Báez (1975)
- Scott Bailes (1985)
- Doug Bair (1971)
- Frank Baker (1969)
- Skeeter Barnes (1980–1982)
- Germán Barranca (1985)
- Jose Barrios (1978)
- Dave Beard (1979)
- Chris Beasley (1986)
- Jay Bell (1985–1986) 2x MLB All-Star
- Rob Belloir (1969)
- Dave Bennett (1970–1971)
- Dámaso Blanco (1966–1967)
- Bobby Bonds (1967) MLB All–Star
- Charlie Bowles (1950, MGR)
- Bert Bradley (1979)
- Bernardo Brito (1986)
- Clay Bryant (1969, MGR)
- T. R. Bryden (1984)
- Chris Bourjos (1978)
- Tom Browning (1983) MLB All-Star
- Bob Buchanan (1982)
- Glenn Burke (1974–1975)
- Lou Camilli (1968–1969)
- Jim Campanis (1971)
- Keefe Cato (1980–1983)
- Phil Cavarretta (1978, MGR) Chicago Cubs Hall of Fame
- Néstor Chávez (1966–1967)
- Steve Christmas (1980–1981)
- Dave Clark (1985)
- Pat Clements (1984)
- Gene Clines (1970)
- Vince Colbert (1968)
- Terry Collins (1974–1975)
- Mike Compton (1980, MGR)
- Joe Connor (1897)
- Tim Conroy (1979)
- Mike Corkins (1966)
- Vic Correll (1969)
- Henry Cruz (1973)
- Eric Davis (1983) Cincinnati Reds Hall of Fame
- Mike Davis (1979)
- Red Davis (1970–1971, MGR)
- Bill Dawley (1980) MLB All-Star
- Dennis DeBarr (1979)
- Bob Detherage (1975–1976)
- Tom Dettore (1970–1971)
- Mike Dimmel (1974–1976)
- Bill Donovan (1897)
- Luis Encarnación (1986)
- Bobby Etheridge (1966)
- Nick Esasky (1980)
- Dick Estelle (1967)
- Ed Farmer (1968–1969) MLB All-Star
- John Farrell (1985–1986)
- Bill Faul (1968)
- Sergio Ferrer (1973)
- Tom Foley (1980)
- Bill Fox (1897)
- Leo Garcia (1983)
- Andy Gilbert (1966–1967, 1977–1978 MGR)
- Mark Gilbert (1980–1982)
- Chuck Goggin (1971)
- Orlando Gomez (1986, MGR)
- Brian Graham (1986)
- Pedro Guerrero (1976) 5x MLB All-Star; 1981 World Series MVP
- John Hale (1974)
- Ben Hayes (1981)
- Fran Healy (1968)
- Gorman Heimueller (1978)
- Phil Hennigan (1969)
- Mike Hedlund (1968)
- Greg Heydeman (1973)
- Trey Hillman (1986)
- Gomer Hodge (1968–1969)
- Rex Hudson (1973)
- Harold George Jeffcoat (1967)
- Greg Johnson (1977)
- Larry Johnson (1969)
- Doug Jones (1985) 5x MLB All-Star
- Jeff Jones (1981, 1984)
- Scott Jordan (1985)
- Wally Joyner (1984) MLB All-Star
- Jeff Lahti (1980)
- Brad Lesley (1983)
- Julio Linares (1966–1967)
- Bob Kearney (1978)
- Tom Kelley (1968–1969)
- Kurt Kepshire (1982)
- Bruce Kison (1970)
- Gary Kroll (1968)
- Terry McDermott (1976)
- Hank LaManna (1947)
- John Lamb (1970)
- Bill Landrum (1982–1983)
- Rafael Landestoy (1975)
- Ron Law (1969)
- Tom Lawless (1980–1981)
- Don LeJohn (1973–1976, MGR)
- Jim Lett (1982–1983, MGR)
- Dennis Lewallyn (1974)
- Jeff Little (1977)
- Dennis Littlejohn (1977)
- Winston Llenas (1894, MGR)
- Dennis Lewallyn (1974)
- John Lowenstein (1968) Baltimore Orioles Hall of Fame
- Urbano Lugo (1984)
- Tony Mack (1984)
- Pepe Mangual (1984)
- Dave Marshall (1966)
- Lou Marone (1971)
- Don Mason (1967)
- Jim McKee (1971)
- Lloyd McClendon (1983)
- Scott Meyer (1979)
- Dave Miley (1983)
- Bobby Moore (1979)
- Kelvin Moore (1979)
- Jose Morales (1966–1967)
- Ray Mueller (1968, MGR)
- Phil Nastu (1977)
- Ed Nottle (1979, MGR)
- Paul O'Neill (baseball) (1983) 5x MLB All-Star; New York Yankees No. 21 retired
- John Paciorek (1969)
- Sam Parrilla (1968)
- Casey Parsons (1977)
- Kevin Pasley (1973)
- Cliff Pastornicky (1986)
- Mike Patterson (1979)
- Bob Pettit (1897)
- Gus Polidor (1984)
- Milt Ramírez (1974)
- Bob Randall (1973)
- Lance Rautzhan (1973–1975)
- Gary Redus (1981)
- Bo Rein (1968)
- Jim Riggleman (1974–1976)
- Reggie Ritter (1985)
- Jim Rittwage (1968–1969)
- Ron Robinson (1980, 1983)
- Jimmy Rosario (1966)
- Wade Rowdon (1983)
- Mike Rowland (1977)
- Jeff Russell (1982) 2x MLB All-Star; Texas Rangers Hall of Fame
- Jim Sadowski (1971)
- George Scherger (1981, MGR)
- Bill Scherrer (1980–1982)
- Dick Sharon (1971)
- Bert Shepard (1949, MGR)
- Steve Shirley (1976)
- Charlie Shoemaker (1970–1971)
- Joe Simpson (1974)
- Craig Smajstrla (1985–1986)
- Daryl Smith (1985–1986)
- Mike Smith (1983)
- Cory Snyder (1985)
- Al Stanek (1966–1967)
- Paul Stevens (1979)
- Les Straker (1981, 1983)
- Jerry Stitt (1969)
- Guy Sularz (1977)
- Rick Sutcliffe (1976) 1979 NL Rookie of the year; 1984 NL Cy Young Award; Chicago Cubs Hall of Fame
- Darrell Sutherland (1968)
- Danny Tartabull (1982) MLB All-Star
- Frank Taveras (1971)
- Bobby Taylor (1966–1967, 1977–1978)
- Kent Tekulve (1971) MLB All-Star; Pittsburgh Pirates Hall of Fame
- Bob Tufts (1978)
- Tony Walker (1981)
- Stan Wall (1973)
- Ron Washington (1976) MLB manager of the year
- Eddie Williams (1986)
- Alan Wirth (1977)
- Oscar Zamora (1968)
- Richie Zisk (1970–1971) 2x MLB All-Star

== See also ==
- Waterbury Indians players
- Waterbury Giants players
- Waterbury Pirates players
- Shelby Dodgers players
- Waterbury A's players
- Waterbury Reds players
- Waterbury Angels players
- Professional baseball in Connecticut
- Waterbury, Connecticut, minor league baseball
- List of Eastern League teams
- Professional baseball in Connecticut
- Waterbury, Connecticut, minor league baseball

Preceded by Pawtucket Indians; Buffalo Bisons	Cleveland Indians; Double-A affiliate 1968–1969; 1985–1986	Succeeded by Savannah Indians; Williamsport Bills
