= Beehive Field =

Stadium in New Britain, Connecticut

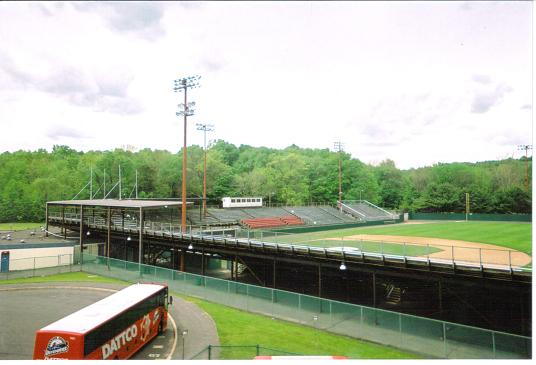
- Interactive map of Beehive Field
- Location: 230 John Karbonic Way; New Britain, CT 06051
- Coordinates: 41°38′54.62″N 72°46′30.76″W
- Capacity: 4,700
- Surface: Grass
- Field size: Left field: 325 feet Center field: 400 feet Right field: 325 feet

Construction
- Opened: 1983

Tenants
- New Britain Red Sox (EL) (1983–1994); Hardware City Rock Cats (EL) (1995); CCSU Blue Devils (NCAA) (2009); Hartford Hawks (NCAA) (prior–2006); New Britain Golden Hurricanes baseball and softball (CCC) (19__–present)

Beehive Field is a stadium in New Britain, Connecticut. The ballpark has a capacity of 4,700. It is primarily used for baseball and was the home of the New Britain Red Sox (Boston Red Sox AA affiliate) from the time of their move to the city in 1983 until moving next door to New Britain Stadium for the 1995 season. The Eastern League All-Star Game was played before 3,106 fans on June 29, 1987, with league-MVP Mark Grace and game-MVP Dwight Smith representing the Pittsfield Cubs. The Hartford Hawks baseball program used the venue for some home games prior to opening Fiondella Field in 2006.

As of 2000, Beehive Field was used primarily by New Britain High School baseball and softball teams.

== Notable games ==
- 1983 Eastern League Championship Series
- 1985 Eastern League Championship Series
- June 29, 1987 – 1987 Eastern League All-Star Game – 3,106
- 1990 Eastern League Championship Series
