= Mackenzie Stadium =

Baseball venue in Holyoke, Massachusetts, US

- The Mack
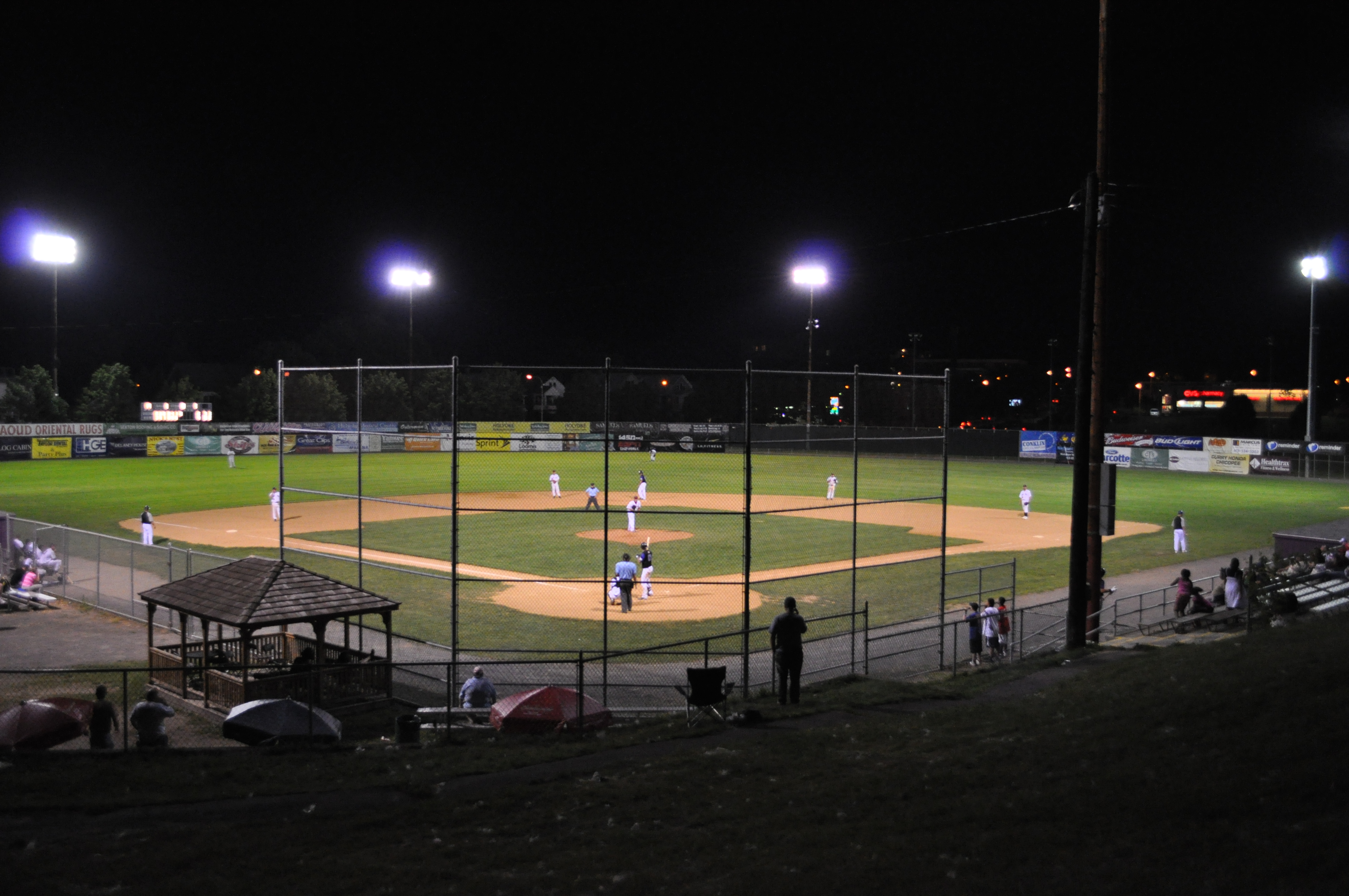
- Interactive map of Mackenzie Stadium
- Location: 500 Beech Street, Holyoke, Massachusetts, US
- Coordinates: 42.200487°N 72.621925°W
- Owner: City of Holyoke
- Operator: Valley Blue Sox Foundation, Inc.
- Capacity: 4,100
- Surface: Natural grass
- Scoreboard: Yes
- Field size: 327 ft. (LF, RF) 377 ft. (CF)

Construction
- Built: 1933; 93 years ago
- Opened: 1933; 93 years ago

Tenants
- Holyoke Bombers (ACFL) (1965); Western Massachusetts Pioneers (ACFL) (1973); Holyoke Millers (EL) (1977–1982); Holyoke Giants (NECBL) (2004–2007); Elms College Blazers (GNAC) (2005–present); Valley Blue Sox (NECBL) (2008–present)

Mackenzie Stadium is a baseball venue located in Holyoke, Massachusetts. It was home to the Holyoke Millers and today is used by both the Valley Blue Sox of the New England Collegiate Baseball League (since 2008) and the Elms College Blazers of the Great Northeast Athletic Conference (since 2005). It was built in 1933 and has a capacity of 4,100 people.

Mackenzie Stadium hosted the 2009 NECBL All-Star Game on July 18, 2009. The game, attended by an All-Star Game record 4,906 fans, was won by the host West Division 6–5.

== Former tenants ==
The stadium was the home of the Holyoke Millers of the Double-A Eastern League for six seasons between 1977 and 1982. The Millers were Eastern League champions in 1980. Following the 1982 season, the franchise moved to Nashua, New Hampshire and became the Nashua Angels. The franchise still exists today as the Harrisburg Senators, Double-A affiliate of the Washington Nationals.

Mackenzie was also home to the Holyoke Giants of the New England Collegiate Baseball League from 2004 to 2007 until the team moved to Lynn, Massachusetts and became the North Shore Navigators.

== Field dedication ==
The stadium is named after Medal of Honor recipient John Mackenzie. Mackenzie was given the honor for actions performed upon the USS Remlick on December 17, 1917, during World War I. The field was dedicated in his honor on September 4, 1939.

== NECBL attendance ==
The following is a list of the attendance figures of the two NECBL franchises to play at Mackenzie Stadium, the Holyoke Giants (2004–2007) and Valley Blue Sox (2008–present). In 2011, the Blue Sox led the NECBL in attendance for the first time.

| Season | Game Avg. | Season Total | Lge. Rk. |
Holyoke Giants
| 2004 | 548 | 11,514 | 8th |
| 2005 | 478 | 10,049 | 9th |
| 2006 | 398 | 8,371 | 10th |
| 2007 | 476 | 10,011 | 9th |
Holyoke/Valley Blue Sox
| 2008 | 1,068 | 22,429 | 5th |
| 2009 | 1,156 | 24,284 | 4th |
| 2010 | 1,182 | 23,636 | 3rd |
| 2011 | 2,510 | 50,206 | 1st |
| 2012 | 974 | 18,497 | 4th |
| 2014 | 1,590 | 30,213 | 2nd |
| 2015 | 1,435 | 30,143 | 2nd |
| 2016 | 2,121 | 44,536 | 1st |
| 2017 | 2,121 | 42,415 | 1st |
| 2018 | 1,754 | 33,332 | 2nd |

== Photo gallery ==
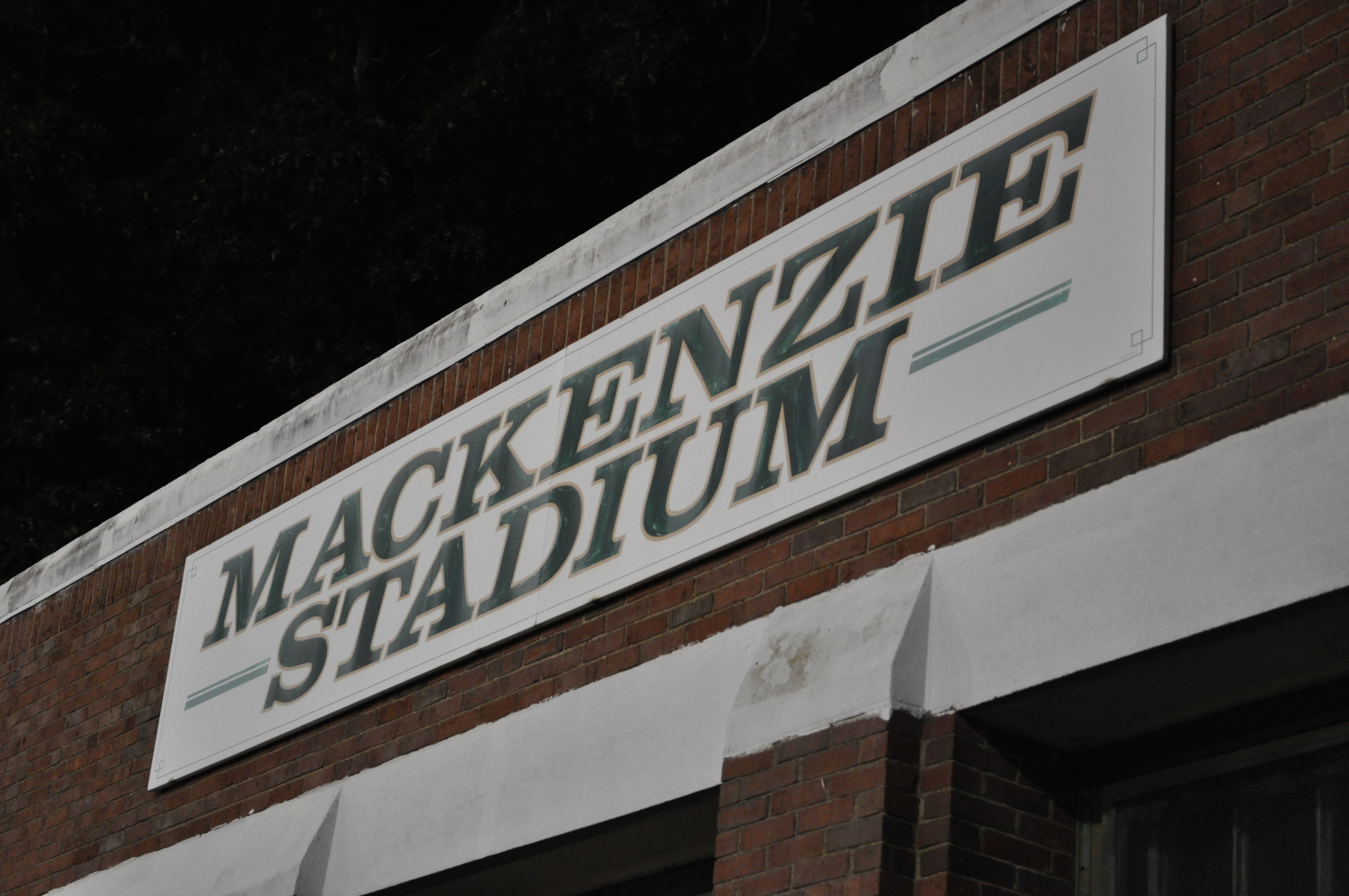
A stadium sign located near the left field entrance

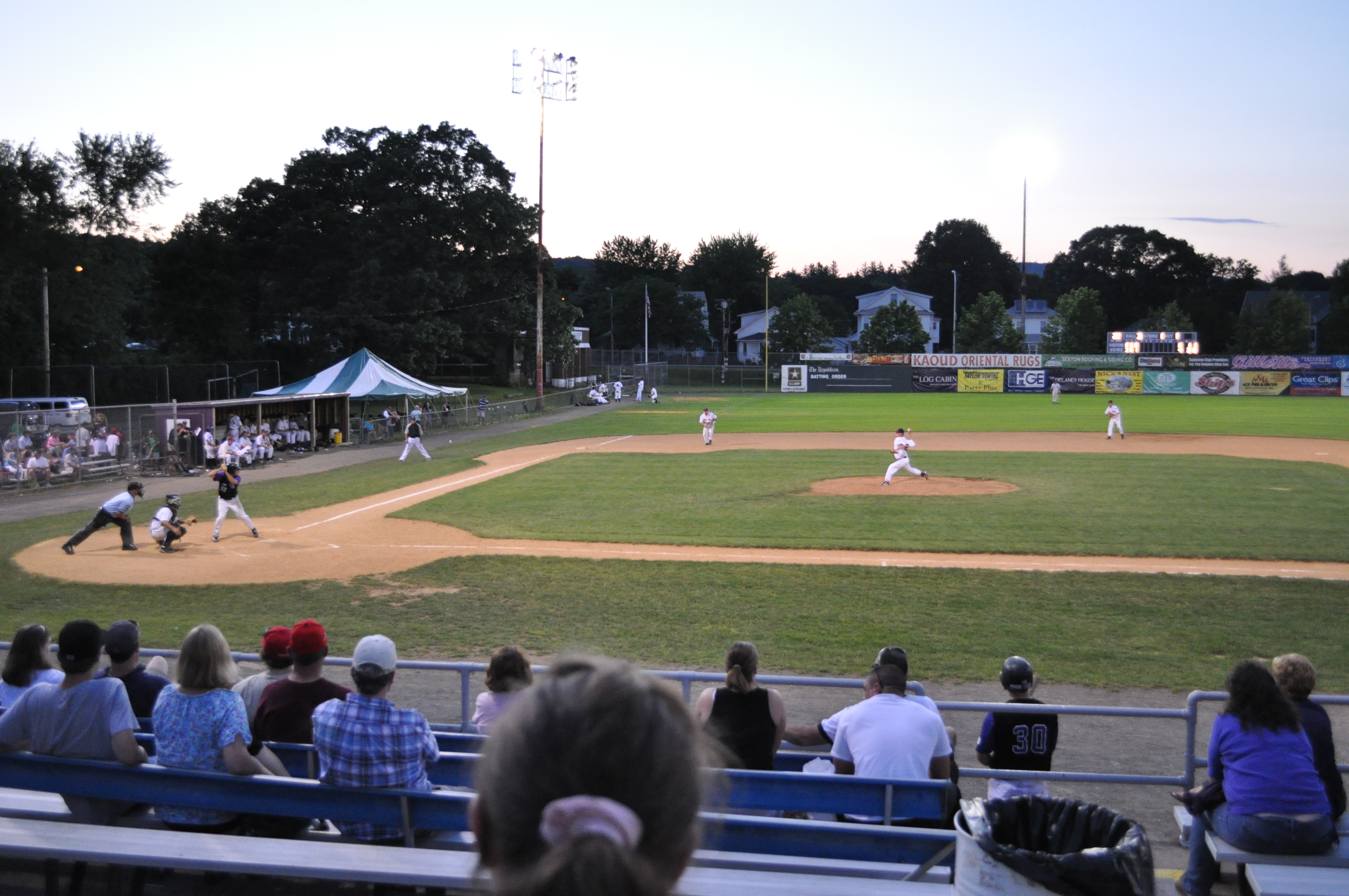

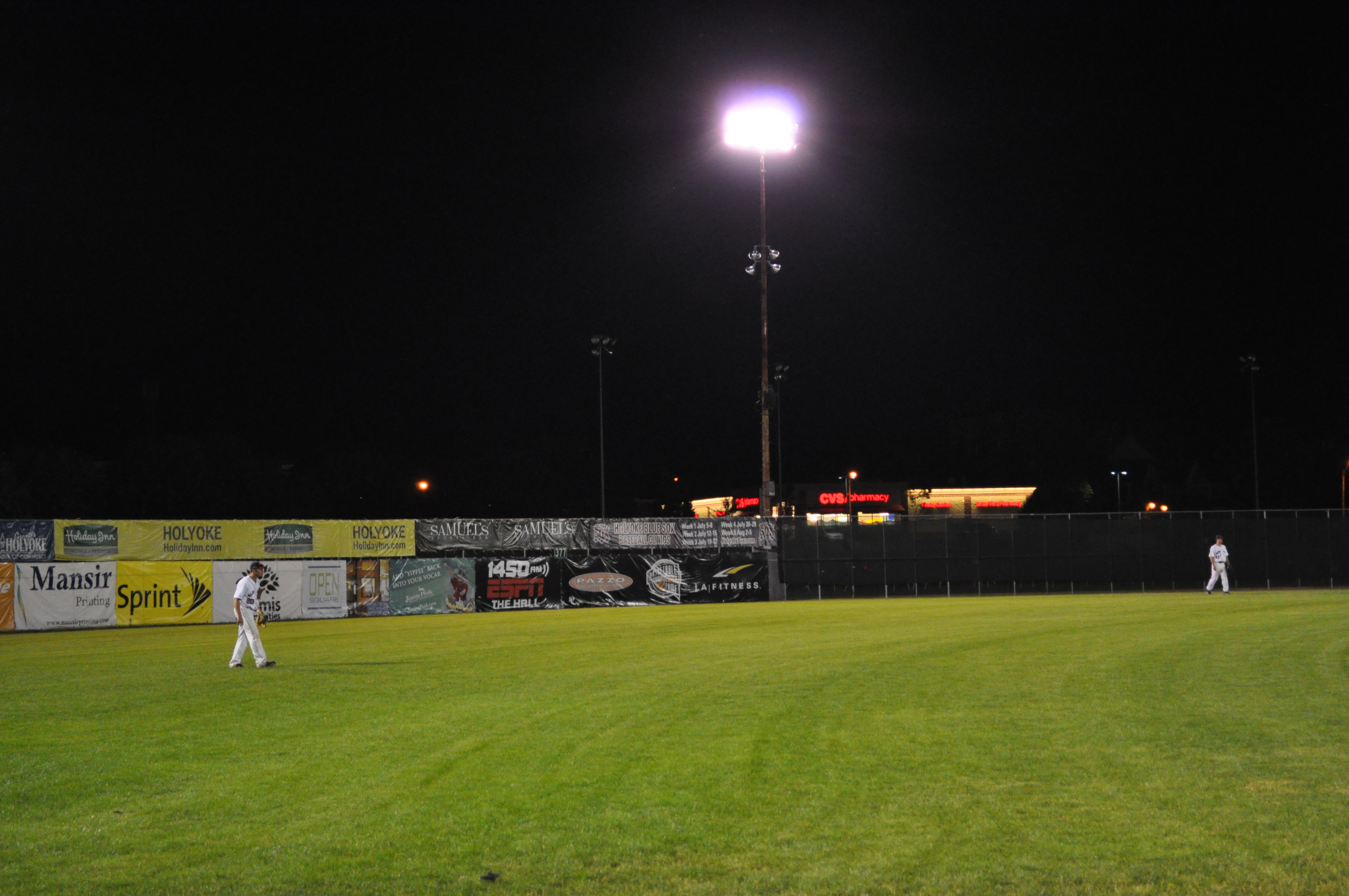
2010 Blue Sox Outfielders Brandon Miller (left) and Nick LaCroix (right)

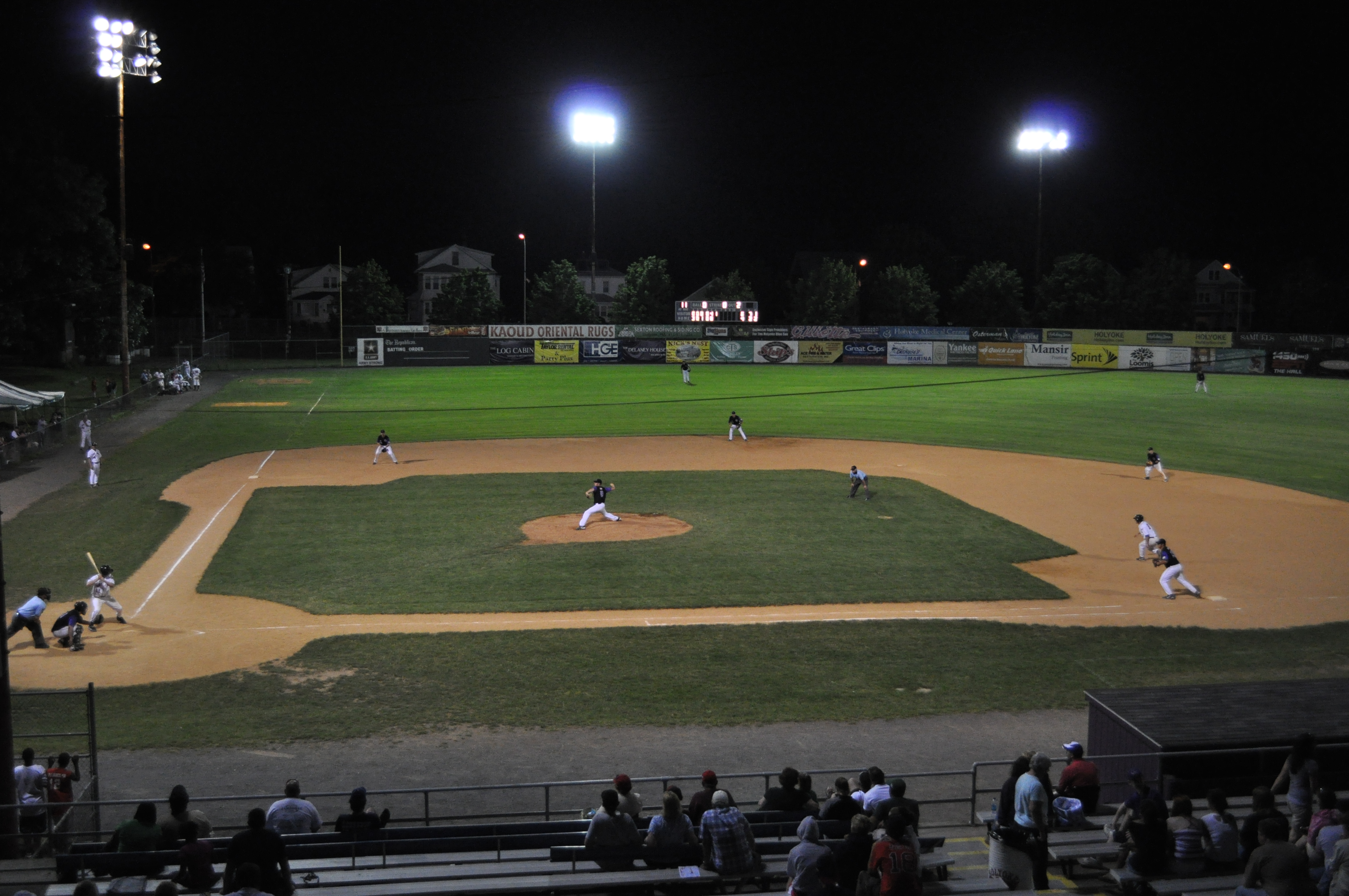

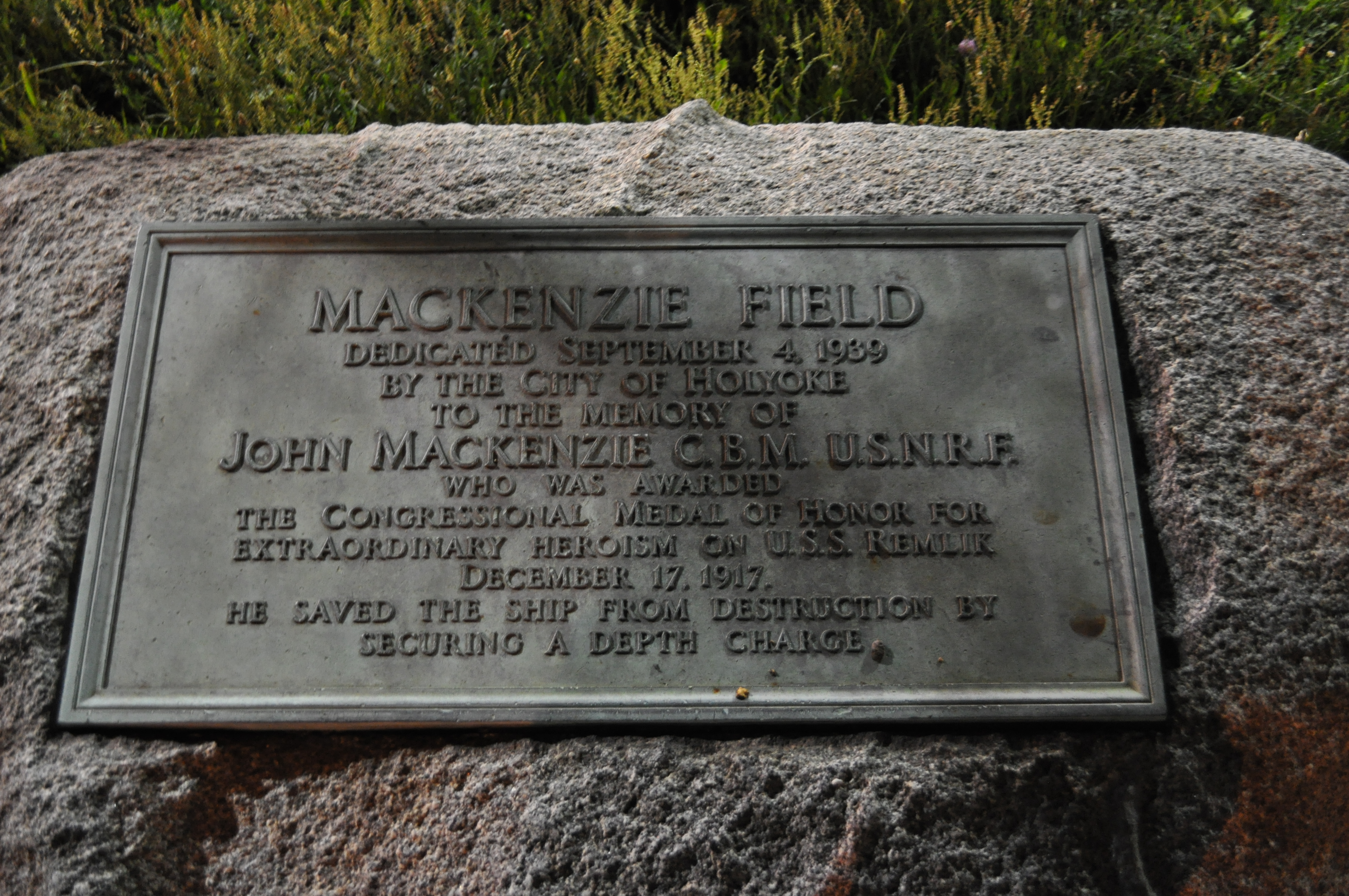
Plaque of dedication located at left field entrance

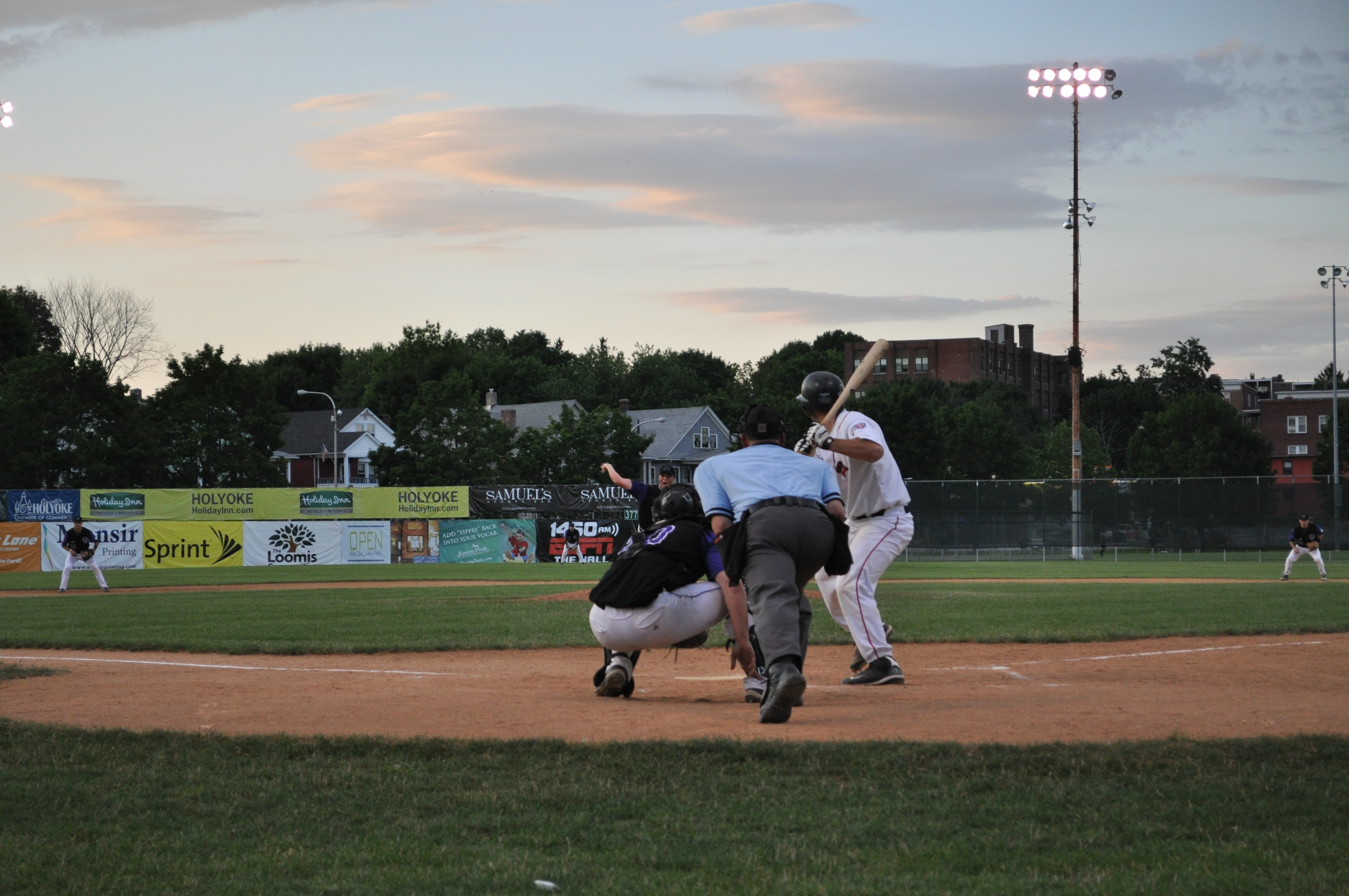

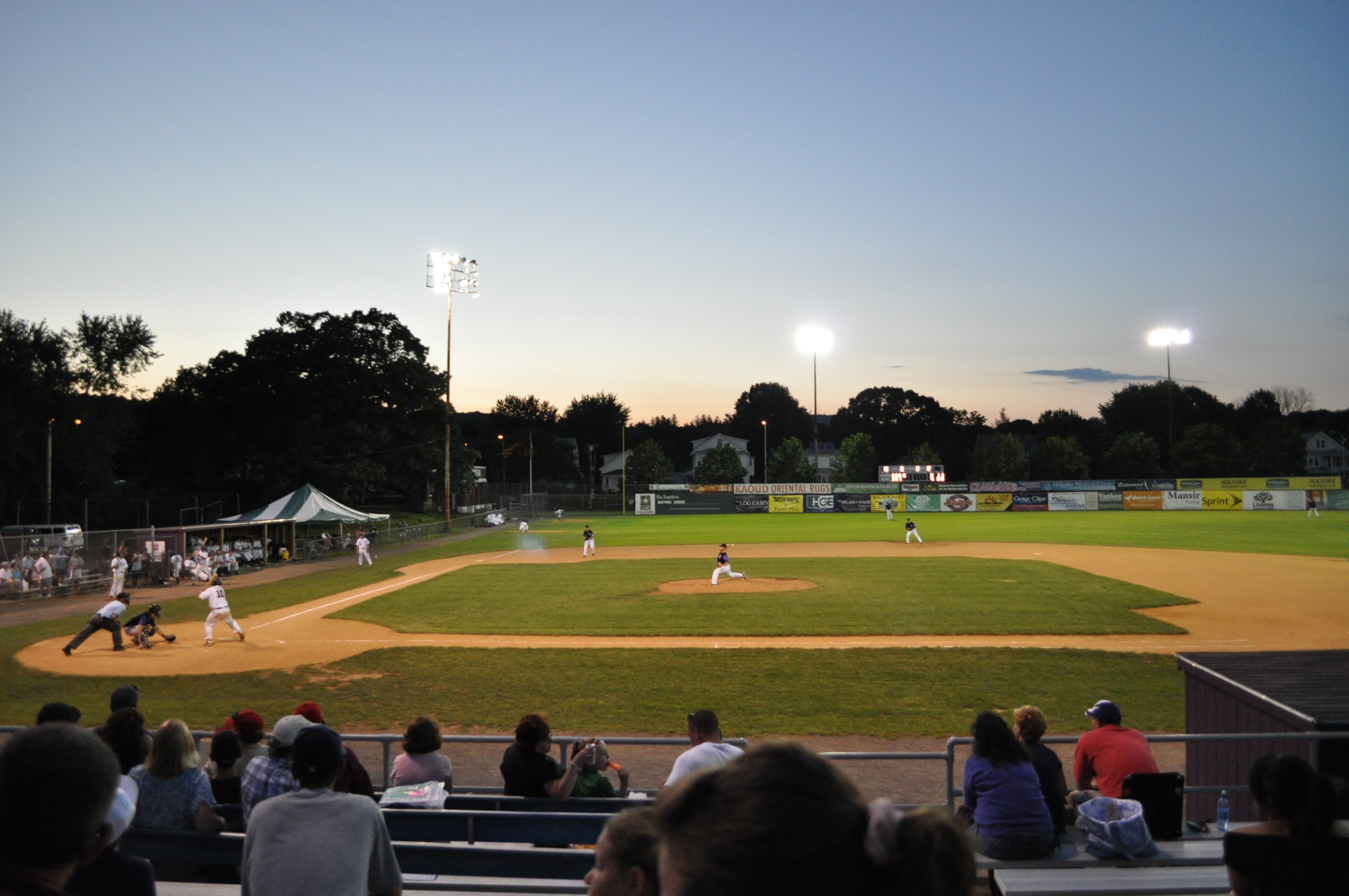
