= Professional baseball in Connecticut =

There have been numerous professional baseball teams in Connecticut since the late 1800s. Most have been minor league teams, however, some early major league teams played in Connecticut. The last major league team was the Hartford Dark Blues, which played its final season in Hartford as a charter member of the newly-established modern National League in 1876.

== History ==
=== New Britain/Bristol ===
Minor League Baseball in New Britain has had a wide variety of teams and notable players, famous players such as Roger Clemens, David Ortiz and Curt Schilling have played for New Britain; The individual considered the fastest pitcher in professional baseball, Steve Dalkowski, also grew up in New Britain. The Boston Red Sox former AA Pawtucket Red Sox moved to Bristol in 1973, and then to New Britain in 1983. In 1995 the New Britain Red Sox became the Minnesota Twins affiliate and changed their name to the Rock Cats. The team switched its affiliation to the Colorado Rockies prior to the 2015 season and left New Britain in favor of Hartford at the end of the 2015 season, but was replaced by the Independent New Britain Bees of the Atlantic League.

At the end of the 2019 season, the New Britain Bees announced the franchise was leaving the Atlantic League, and reorganizing as an amateur team in the New England–based Futures Collegiate Baseball League (FCBL). The nearby Bristol Blues transferred from the FCBL to the New England Collegiate Baseball League (NECBL) at the end of 2019, creating a vacancy in the league for the Bees.

=== Hartford ===
Hartford had nearly continuous baseball from 1874 to 1952, including early major league baseball teams from 1874 to 1877. Notable events include five league titles by the Hartford Senators. In 2016, the former minor league club from New Britain began play as the Hartford Yard Goats, but did not play a home game in Hartford until 2017.

=== Waterbury ===
Several different Minor League Baseball teams have been located in the city of Waterbury, Connecticut since 1884. These include 1884–1888, 1891, 1894–1895, 1897–1902, 1906–1914, 1918–1928, 1947–1950, 1966–1971, and 1973–1986. Teams won their respective league championships three times in 1924, 1925, and 1970.

The earliest Waterbury teams played in the Connecticut State League between 1884 and 1912. These teams went by several different nicknames during this period, including the Brassmen, Brass City, Indians, Pirates, Rough Riders, Authors, Invisibles, Finnegans, Champs and Spuds. The Waterbury Brasscos (also called the Nattatucks) played in the old Eastern League from 1918–1928. They won two league titles in 1924 and 1925. The Waterbury Timers played in the Colonial League between 1947 and 1950.

Waterbury became home to professional baseball again in 1966 when the Waterbury Giants, an affiliate of Major League Baseball's San Francisco Giants came to town. From 1966 to 1986 (with the exception of 1972), the Waterbury team played in the Eastern League as an affiliate of the Giants, Cleveland Indians, Los Angeles Dodgers, Oakland Athletics, Cincinnati Reds and California Angels. The team name changed every time the affiliation agreement changed hands. Waterbury did not have an Eastern League team at the start of the 1972 season. However, in the middle of the season, flooding made the ballpark in Elmira, New York unusable, and so the Elmira Pioneers played their "home games" in the second half of the 1972 season in Waterbury.

The Independent Northeast League chose to place a team in Waterbury in 1997 as the Waterbury Spirit, but they moved after the 2000 season to become the North Shore Spirit.

== Summary of franchises by city ==
=== Bridgeport ===
==== Former Bridgeport teams ====
Franchise name	Years active	Level	League	MLB affiliate	Home venue
Bridgeport Bluefish	1997–2017	N/A	Atlantic League (Independent of MLB)	N/A	Harbor Yard, Bridgeport
Bridgeport Bees	1947–1950	B	Colonial League	N/A	Candlelite Stadium, Bridgeport

=== Hartford ===
==== Hartford Yard Goats (active) ====
Franchise name	Years active	Level	League	MLB affiliate	Home venue
Hartford Yard Goats	Since 2016; Bristol/New Britain since 1973	AA	Eastern League	Colorado Rockies	Dunkin' Donuts Park, Hartford (from 2017); Dodd Stadium early 2016

==== Former Hartford teams ====
Franchise name	Years active	Level	League	MLB affiliate	Home venue
Hartford Dark Blues; Hartfords of Brooklyn (1877)	1874–1877	MLB	National Association (1874–75); National League (1876–1877)	--	Hartford Ball Club Grounds
New Bedford/New Haven/Hartford	1878	N/A	International Association	--	--
Hartford Babies (1885)/ Hartford (1884)	1884–1885	N/A	Connecticut State League (1884–1885); Southern New England League (1885)	--	--
Hartford Dark Blues	1885–1886	N/A	Eastern League (original)	--	--
Hartford	1889–1890	N/A	Atlantic Association	--	--
Hartford	1891	E	Connecticut State League	--	--
Hartford Cooperatives (1898); Hartford Bluebirds (1895–1897)	1895–1898	B (1897–1898)	Atlantic League (1896–1899); Connecticut State League (1895)	--	--
Hartford Indians/ Wooden Nutmegs	1899–1901	A	Eastern League (original)	--	--
Hartford Senators	1902–1945 (also known as the Bees and the Laurels)	A (1919–1933); B (1905–1918, 1934) *varies	Eastern League (1916–1933); Northeastern League (1934); Colonial League (1915); Eastern Association (1913–1914); Connecticut State League (1902–1912)	-- Brooklyn Dodgers (1932) -- Boston Bees (1938-1940) -- Boston Braves (1941-1945)	Morgan G. Bulkeley Stadium
Hartford Chiefs (1946–52); Hartford Bees (1939–45); Hartford Laurels (1938,1944)	1938–1952	A	Eastern League	--	Morgan G. Bulkeley Stadium

Note: Clubs frequently changed leagues in early baseball history; franchise dates are approximate. From Baseball-Reference.

=== New Britain/Bristol ===
==== Active former professional teams ====
Franchise name	Years active	Level	League	MLB affiliate	Home venue
New Britain Bees*	Since 2016	N/A	Futures Collegiate Baseball League (Amateur) Atlantic League 2016-2019 (Independent of MLB)	N/A	New Britain Stadium

==== Former New Britain teams ====
Franchise name	Years active	Level	League	MLB affiliate	Home venue
New Britain Rock Cats (1997–2015)*/ New Britain Red Sox (1983–94)/ Bristol Red Sox (1973–82)	1983–2015 (New Britain); 1973-1982 (Bristol)	AA	EL	Colorado Rockies (2015–2017)*; Minnesota Twins (1995–2014); Boston Red Sox-AL (1973–94)	New Britain Stadium (1995–2015); Beehive Field 1983-94 (Both at Willow Brook Park); Muzzy Field, Bristol (1973–82)
New Britain Sinks	1908–1914	B	Eastern Association		
New Britain Brass City	1891	E	Connecticut State League		
New Britain	1884–1885	N/A	Southern New England League		

Note^{1}: Also known as the "Hardware City Rock Cats" circa 1995-1996

Note^{2}: Team moved to Hartford at the conclusion of the 2015 season

==== Former Bristol teams ====
Franchise name	Years active	Level	League	MLB affiliate	Home venue
Bristol Owls	1949-1950	B	Colonial League	N/A	Muzzy Field

=== Middletown ===
==== Former Middletown teams ====
Franchise name	Years active	Level	League	MLB affiliate	Home venue
Middletown Mansfields	1872	MLB	National Association	N/A	Mansfield Club Grounds

=== Norwich ===
==== Norwich Sea Unicorns (active) ====
Franchise name	Years active	Level	League	MLB affiliate	Home venue
Connecticut Tigers (2010-2019)/ Norwich Sea Unicorns (2020–Present)	Since 2010	A-Short Season (2010-2020)	New York-Penn League (2010-2020); Futures Collegiate Baseball League (2021-Present)	Detroit Tigers 2010-2020	Dodd Stadium

Note: Due to the 2020 MLB Takeover of the MiLB, The New York-Penn League and the entire Class A-Short Season system was shut down. The Norwich Sea Unicorns have been a part of the Futures Collegiate Baseball League since 2021.

==== Former Norwich teams ====
Franchise name	Years active	Level	League	MLB affiliate	Home venue
Norwich Navigators (1995–05)/ Connecticut Defenders (2006–09)	1995–2009	AA	EL	New York Yankees-AL (1995-02); San Francisco Giants-NL (2003–09)	Dodd Stadium

Note: Team relocated to Richmond, Virginia at the end of 2009.

=== New Haven ===
==== Former New Haven and metro area teams ====
Franchise name	Years active	Level	League	MLB affiliate	Home venue
New Haven County Cutters	2004–2007	N/A	Can-Am League (independent)	N/A	Yale Field
New Haven Ravens	1994–2003	AA	EL	St. Louis Cardinals (2001–2002); Seattle Mariners (1999–2000); Colorado Rockies (1994–1998)	Yale Field
West Haven Yankees (1972–80); West Haven White Caps (1980); West Haven A's (1981–82)	1972–1982	AA	EL	New York Yankees (1972-1980); Oakland Athletics (1980-1982)	Quigley Stadium
New Haven Elm Citys	1875	MLB	National Association	N/A	Howard Avenue Field

Note: New Haven Ravens relocated to New Hampshire at the end of 2003.

Note: West Haven Yankees known as White Caps for 1980 season, switched to the West Haven A's for the 1981 and 1982 seasons before folding.

=== Waterbury ===
==== Former Waterbury teams ====
Franchise name	Years active	Level	League	MLB affiliate	Home venue
Waterbury Spirit	1997–2000		Northeast League (1997–1998) Northern League East (1999–2000)	Independent	Municipal Stadium
Waterbury Indians	1985–1986	Class AA (1966–1986)	Eastern League (1966–1986)	Cleveland Indians (1985–1986)	Municipal Stadium
Waterbury Angels	1984	Class AA (1966–1986)	Eastern League (1966–1986)	California Angels (1984)	Municipal Stadium
Waterbury Reds	1980–1983	Class AA (1966–1986)	Eastern League (1966–1986)	Cincinnati Reds (1980–1983)	Municipal Stadium
Waterbury A's	1979	Class AA (1966–1986)	Eastern League (1966–1986)	Oakland Athletics (1979)	Municipal Stadium
Waterbury Giants	1977–1978	Class AA (1966–1986)	Eastern League (1966–1986)	San Francisco Giants (1977–1978)	Municipal Stadium
Waterbury Dodgers	1973–1976	Class AA (1966–1986)	Eastern League (1966–1986)	Los Angeles Dodgers (1973–1976)	Municipal Stadium
Waterbury Pirates	1970–1971	Class AA (1966–1986)	Eastern League (1966–1986)	Pittsburgh Pirates (1970–1971)	Municipal Stadium
Waterbury Indians	1968–1969	Class AA (1966–1986)	Eastern League (1966–1986)	Cleveland Indians (1968–1969)	Municipal Stadium
Waterbury Giants	1966–1967	Class AA (1966–1986)	Eastern League (1966–1986)	San Francisco Giants (1966–1967)	Municipal Stadium
Waterbury Timers	1947–1950	Class B (1947–1950)	Colonial League (1947–1950)		Municipal Stadium
Waterbury Brasscos	1920–1928	Class A (1919–1928)	Eastern League (1918–1928)		Municipal Stadium
Waterbury Nattatucks	1918–1919	Class A (1919–1928)	Eastern League (1918–1928)		Municipal Stadium
Waterbury Nattatucks	1918–1919	Class B (1906–1914, 1918)	Eastern League (1918–1928)		Municipal Stadium
Waterbury Contenders	1913–1914	Class B (1906–1914, 1918)	Eastern Association (1913–1914)		Municipal Stadium
Waterbury Spuds	1912	Class B (1906–1914, 1918)	Connecticut State League (1900–1902, 1906–1912)		Municipal Stadium
Waterbury Champs	1911	Class B (1906–1914, 1918)	Connecticut State League (1900–1902, 1906–1912)		Municipal Stadium
Waterbury Finnegans	1910	Class B (1906–1914, 1918)	Connecticut State League (1900–1902, 1906–1912)		Municipal Stadium
Waterbury Invincibles	1909	Class B (1906–1914, 1918)	Connecticut State League (1900–1902, 1906–1912)		Municipal Stadium
Waterbury Authors	1906–1908	Class B (1906–1914, 1918)	Connecticut State League (1900–1902, 1906–1912)		Municipal Stadium
Waterbury Rough Riders	1899–1902	Class D (1902)	Connecticut League (1899)		Municipal Stadium
Waterbury Rough Riders	1899–1902	Class F (1897–1901)	Connecticut State League (1888, 1891, 1894–1898)		Municipal Stadium
Waterbury Pirates	1898	Class F (1897–1901)	Connecticut State League (1888, 1891, 1894–1898)		Municipal Stadium
Waterbury Indians	1897	Class F (1897–1901)	Connecticut State League (1888, 1891, 1894–1898)		Municipal Stadium
Waterbury Brassmen	1895	Class B (1894)	Connecticut State League (1888, 1891, 1894–1898)		Municipal Stadium
Waterbury	1888, 1891, 1894	Class E (1891)	Connecticut State League (1888, 1891, 1894–1898)		Municipal Stadium
Waterbury Brass City	1887		Eastern League (1885–1887)		Municipal Stadium
Waterbury Brassmen	1886		Eastern League (1885–1887)		Municipal Stadium
Waterbury	1884–1885		Southern New England League (1885)		Municipal Stadium
Waterbury	1884–1885		Connecticut State League (1884–1885)		Municipal Stadium
