= Don LeJohn =

American baseball player (1934–2005)

- Third baseman
- Born: May 13, 1934; Daisytown, Pennsylvania, U.S.
- Died: February 25, 2005 (aged 70); California, Pennsylvania, U.S.
- Batted: Right Threw: Right

MLB debut
- June 30, 1965, for the Los Angeles Dodgers

Last MLB appearance
- October 3, 1965, for the Los Angeles Dodgers

MLB statistics
- Batting average: .256
- Home runs: 0
- Runs: 2
- Stats at Baseball Reference

Teams
- Los Angeles Dodgers (1965)

Career highlights and awards
- World Series champion (1965)

Donald Everett LeJohn (May 13, 1934 in Daisytown, Pennsylvania – February 25, 2005 in California, Pennsylvania) was an American Major League Baseball (MLB) third baseman and Minor League Baseball manager during his long career in professional baseball.

== Career ==
LeJohn was signed by the Brooklyn Dodgers in 1954 and played in the minor leagues through 1971 with various Dodgers affiliates. He was a minor league All-Star in 1954, 1955 and 1964. LeJohn made one stop in the majors, with the Los Angeles Dodgers in 1965 and had one at-bat as a pinch-hitter in the World Series that year. He struck out swinging in the ninth inning of game 1.

LeJohn started managing as a player/manager with the Tri-City Atoms in the Northwest League in 1967 and continued to manage in the Dodgers' farm system for twenty years after he finished playing.

The teams he managed:

- Tri-City Atoms (1967–1968)
- Bakersfield Dodgers (1969–1972)
- Waterbury Dodgers (1973–1976)
- San Antonio Dodgers (1977–1982)
- Lodi Dodgers (1983)
- Bakersfield Dodgers (1984, 1986)

LeJohn finished with a career managerial record of 1243–1238, and won two league championships.
