= 1984 Eastern League season =

The 1984 Eastern League season began on approximately April 1 and the regular season ended on approximately September 1.

The Vermont Reds defeated the Waterbury Angels three games to two to win the Eastern League Championship Series.

== Regular season ==
=== Standings ===
Eastern League
Team	Win	Loss	%	GB
Albany/Colonie A's	81	57	.587	–
Glens Falls White Sox	75	63	.543	6.0
**Waterbury Angels**	76	64	.543	6.0
**Vermont Reds**	75	65	.536	7.0
Buffalo Bisons	72	67	.518	9.5
New Britain Red Sox	64	76	.457	18.0
Nashua Pirates	58	82	.414	24.0
Reading Phillies	56	83	.403	25.5

Notes:

Green shade indicates that team advanced to the playoffs
Bold indicates that team advanced to ELCS
Italics indicates that team won ELCS

== Playoffs ==
=== Semi-finals series ===
Vermont Reds defeated Albany/Colonie A's 3 games to 0.

Waterbury Angels defeated Glens Falls White Sox 3 games to 1.

=== Championship Series ===
Vermont Reds defeated Waterbury Angels 3 games to 2.

== Attendance ==
1984 Eastern League	Regular season	Playoffs
**Total attendance**	957,172	12,528
**Total games played**	557	12
**Average attendance per game**	1,718	1,044
