= 1980 Eastern League season =

The 1980 Eastern League season began on approximately April 1 and the regular season ended on approximately September 1.

The Holyoke Millers defeated the Waterbury Reds two games to one to win the Eastern League Championship Series.

== Regular season ==
=== Standings ===
Eastern League - Northern Division
Team	Win	Loss	%	GB
**Holyoke Millers**	78	61	.561	–
Buffalo Bisons	67	70	.489	10.0
Lynn Sailors	66	71	.482	11.0
Glens Falls White Sox	63	74	.460	14.0

Eastern League - Southern Division
Team	Win	Loss	%	GB
Bristol Red Sox	79	60	.568	–
Reading Phillies	78	61	.561	1.0
**Waterbury Reds**	75	64	.540	4.0
West Haven Whitecaps	47	92	.338	32.0

Notes:

Green shade indicates that team advanced to the playoffs
Bold indicates that team advanced to ELCS
Italics indicates that team won ELCS

== Playoffs ==
=== Semi-finals Series ===
Holyoke Millers defeated Buffalo Bisons 2 games to 0.

Waterbury Reds defeated Reading Phillies 2 games to 0.

=== Championship Series ===
Holyoke Millers defeated Waterbury Reds 2 games to 1.

== Attendance ==
1980 Eastern League	Regular season	Playoffs
**Total attendance**	579,113	12,335
**Total games played**	553	7
**Average attendance per game**	1,047	1,762
