= Western Massachusetts Pioneers =

Defunct American football team

- Founded: 1973
- Folded: 1973
- League: Atlantic Coast Football League
- Based in: Holyoke, Massachusetts
- Arena: MacKenzie Stadium

The Western Massachusetts Pioneers were a minor league American football team based in Holyoke, Massachusetts. They played one season in the Atlantic Coast Football League (ACFL) in 1973 and played their home games at MacKenzie Stadium in Holyoke.
