= Waterbury, Connecticut, minor league baseball =

Waterbury Baseball
- 1884–1986; (1884–1888, 1891, 1894–1895, 1897–1902, 1906–1914, 1918–1928, 1947–1950, 1966–1971, 1973–1986); Waterbury, Connecticut

Minor league affiliations
- Previous classes: Class AA (1966–1986); Class B (1947–1950); Class A (1919–1928); Class B (1906–1914, 1918); Class D (1902); Class F (1897–1901); Class B (1894); Class E (1891)
- League: Eastern League (1966-1986)
- Previous leagues: Colonial League (1947–1950); Eastern League (1918–1928); Eastern Association (1913–1914); Connecticut State League (1900–1902, 1906–1912); Connecticut League (1899); Connecticut State League (1888, 1891, 1894–1898); Eastern League (1885–1887); Southern New England League (1885); Connecticut State League (1884–1885)

Major league affiliations
- Previous teams: Cleveland Indians (1985–1986); California Angels (1984); Cincinnati Reds (1980–1983); Oakland Athletics (1979); San Francisco Giants (1977–1978); Los Angeles Dodgers (1973–1976); Pittsburgh Pirates (1970-1971); Cleveland Indians (1968–1969); San Francisco Giants (1966–1967)

Minor league titles
- League titles: 3 (1924, 1925, 1970)

Team data
- Previous names: Waterbury Indians (1985–1986); Waterbury Angels (1984); Waterbury Reds (1980–1983); Waterbury A's (1979); Waterbury Giants (1977–1978); Waterbury Dodgers (1973–1976); Waterbury Pirates (1970–1971); Waterbury Indians (1968–1969); Waterbury Giants (1966–1967); Waterbury Timers (1947–1950); Waterbury Brasscos (1920–1928); Waterbury Nattatucks (1918–1919); Waterbury Contenders (1913–1914); Waterbury Spuds (1912); Waterbury Champs (1911); Waterbury Finnegans (1910); Waterbury Invincibles (1909); Waterbury Authors (1906–1908); Waterbury Rough Riders (1899–1902); Waterbury Pirates (1898); Waterbury Indians (1897); Waterbury Brassmen (1895); Waterbury (1888, 1891, 1894); Waterbury Brass City (1887); Waterbury Brassmen (1886); Waterbury (1884–1885)
- Previous parks: Municipal Stadium

Several different Minor League Baseball teams have been located in the city of Waterbury, Connecticut, United States, since 1884.

== Teams ==
=== Connecticut State League teams ===
The earliest Waterbury teams played in the Connecticut State League between 1884 and 1912. These teams went by several different nicknames during this period, including the Brassmen, Brass City, Indians, Pirates, Rough Riders, Authors, Invisibles, Finnegans, Champs and Spuds.

=== Waterbury Brasscos ===
The Waterbury Brasscos (also called the Nattatucks) played in the Eastern League from 1918 to 1928. They won two league titles in 1924 and 1925.

=== Waterbury Timers ===
The Waterbury Timers played in the Colonial League between 1947 and 1950.

=== Eastern League MLB affiliate ===
Waterbury became home to professional baseball again in 1966 when the Waterbury Giants, an affiliate of Major League Baseball's San Francisco Giants came to town. From 1966-1986 (with the exception of 1972), the Waterbury team played in the Eastern League as an affiliate of the Giants, Cleveland Indians, Pittsburgh Pirates, Los Angeles Dodgers, Oakland Athletics, Cincinnati Reds and California Angels. The team name changed every time the affiliation agreement changed hands. Waterbury did not have an Eastern League team at the start of the 1972 season. However, midway through the season, flooding in Elmira, New York made the home ballpark of the Elmira Pioneers unusable, forcing them to play their "home games" in the second half of the 1972 season in Waterbury.

=== Waterbury Spirit ===
The Independent Northeast League chose to place a team in Waterbury in 1997 as the Waterbury Spirit, but they folded after the 2000 season, only to be resurrected in 2003 under a new owner, relocating to Lynn, Massachusetts and becoming the North Shore Spirit.

== See also ==
- Professional baseball in Connecticut
- Waterbury Indians

Preceded by Pawtucket Indians; Buffalo Bisons	Cleveland Indians; Double-A affiliate 1968–1969; 1985–1986	Succeeded by Savannah Indians; Williamsport Bills
