= John MacKenzie (Medal of Honor) =

American Medal of Honor recipient

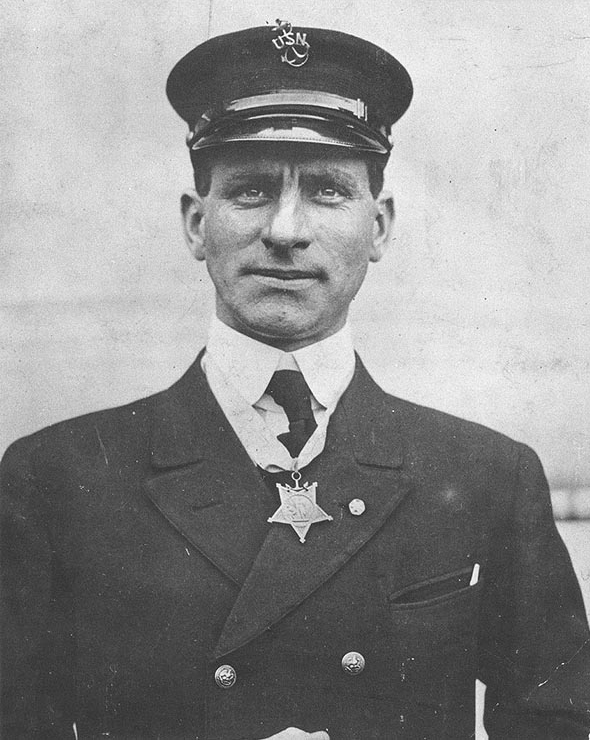
- John MacKenzie, wearing his Medal of Honor
- Born: July 7, 1886; Bridgeport, Connecticut
- Died: December 26, 1933 (aged 47); Holyoke, Massachusetts
- Military career
- Allegiance: United States of America
- Branch: United States Naval Reserve
- Service years: 1902 – 1907, 1917 - 1918
- Rank: Chief Boatswain's Mate
- Unit: USS Remlik (SP-157)
- Conflicts: World War I
- Awards: Medal of Honor

John MacKenzie (July 7, 1886 – December 26, 1933) was a sailor in the United States Naval Reserve and a recipient of the Medal of Honor.

== Biography ==
Born at Bridgeport, Connecticut, MacKenzie enlisted in the Navy at Springfield, Massachusetts, on December 20, 1902, and had attained the rate of Coxswain before his discharge on July 6, 1907. He engaged in the auto accessory business in Springfield, but reenlisted in the Navy in 1917, when the United States entered World War I.

While serving on board USS Remlik (SP-157) during a storm in the Bay of Biscay, MacKenzie observed a depth charge adrift on the ship's after deck. At great risk to his life, he took prompt and effective action to secure the explosive weapon, thus preventing the "probable loss of the ship and the entire crew". For his heroism on that occasion, Chief Boatswain's Mate John MacKenzie was awarded the Medal of Honor.

After the end of the First World War, John MacKenzie returned to civilian life and subsequently entered the restaurant business. He died at Holyoke, Massachusetts, on December 26, 1933, at the age of 47 years, following a heart attack. A large baseball complex in Holyoke is named Mackenzie Stadium and a plaque under the American flag in left field honors MacKenzie and his deeds aboard the Remlik.

== Medal of Honor citation ==
Rank and organization: Chief Boatswain's Mate, U.S. Navy. Born: July 7, 1886, Bridgeport, Conn. Accredited to: Massachusetts. G.O. No.: 391, 1918.

Citation:

For extraordinary heroism while serving on board the U.S.S. Remlik, on the morning of 17 December 1917, when the Remlik encountered a heavy gale. During this gale, there was a heavy sea running. The depth charge box on the taffrail aft, containing a Sperry depth charge, was washed overboard, the depth charge itself falling inboard and remaining on deck. MacKenzie, on his own initiative, went aft and sat down on the depth charge, as it was impracticable to carry it to safety until the ship was headed up into the sea. In acting as he did, MacKenzie exposed his life and prevented a serious accident to the ship and probable loss of the ship and the entire crew.

== See also ==
- List of Medal of Honor recipients
- List of Medal of Honor recipients for World War I
