= 1987 Eastern League season =

The 1987 Eastern League season began on approximately April 1 and the regular season ended on approximately September 1.

The Harrisburg Senators defeated the Vermont Reds three games to one to win the Eastern League Championship Series.

== Regular season ==
=== Standings ===
Eastern League
Team	Win	Loss	%	GB
Pittsfield Cubs	87	51	.630	–
**Harrisburg Senators**	77	63	.550	11.0
Reading Phillies	76	63	.547	11.5
**Vermont Reds**	73	67	.521	15.0
Albany/Colonie Yankees	64	75	.460	23.5
New Britain Red Sox	61	79	.436	27.0
Williamsport Bills	60	79	.432	27.5
Glens Falls Tigers	58	79	.423	28.5

Notes:

Green shade indicates that team advanced to the playoffs
Bold indicates that team advanced to ELCS
Italics indicates that team won ELCS

== Playoffs ==
=== Semi-finals Series ===
Harrisburg Senators defeated Reading Phillies 3 games to 2.

Vermont Reds defeated Pittsfield Cubs 3 games to 1.

=== Championship Series ===
Harrisburg Senators defeated Vermont Reds 3 games to 1.

== Attendance ==
1987 Eastern League	Regular season	Playoffs
**Total attendance**	975,005	24,693
**Total games played**	556	13
**Average attendance per game**	1,754	1,899
