= 1982 Eastern League season =

The 1982 Eastern League season began on approximately April 1 and the regular season ended on approximately September 1. This was the last season until 1994 in which the league was separated into two divisions, as it would move to one division beginning with the 1983 season.

The West Haven A's defeated the Lynn Sailors three games to zero to win the Eastern League Championship Series.

== Regular season ==
=== Standings ===
Eastern League - Northern Division
| Team | Win | Loss | % | GB |
|---|---|---|---|---|
| **Lynn Sailors** | 82 | 57 | .590 | – |
| Glens Falls White Sox | 77 | 63 | .550 | 5.5 |
| Holyoke Millers | 63 | 77 | .450 | 19.5 |
| Buffalo Bisons | 55 | 84 | .396 | 27.0 |

Eastern League - Southern Division
| Team | Win | Loss | % | GB |
|---|---|---|---|---|
| **West Haven A's** | 86 | 54 | .614 | – |
| Bristol Red Sox | 75 | 65 | .536 | 11.0 |
| Reading Phillies | 63 | 75 | .457 | 22.0 |
| Waterbury Reds | 56 | 82 | .406 | 29.0 |

Notes:

Green shade indicates that team advanced to the playoffs
Bold indicates that team advanced to ELCS
Italics indicates that team won ELCS

== Playoffs ==
=== Semi-finals Series ===
Lynn Sailors defeated Glens Falls White Sox 2 games to 0.

=== Championship Series ===
West Haven A's defeated Lynn Sailors 3 games to 0.

== Attendance ==
| 1982 Eastern League | Regular season | Playoffs |
|---|---|---|
| **Total attendance** | 504,574 | 2,803 |
| **Total games played** | 557 | 5 |
| **Average attendance per game** | 906 | 561 |
