= 1994 Eastern League season =

The 1994 Eastern League season began on approximately April 1 and the regular season ended on approximately September 1.

The Binghamton Mets defeated the Harrisburg Senators 3 games to 1 to win the Eastern League Championship Series.

== Regular season ==
=== Standings ===
Eastern League – Northern Division
Team	Win	Loss	%	GB
**Binghamton Mets**	82	59	.582	–
New Haven Ravens	77	63	.550	4.5
Albany-Colonie Yankees	71	70	.504	11.0
Portland Sea Dogs	60	81	.426	22.0
New Britain Rock Cats	59	81	.421	22.5

Eastern League – Southern Division
Team	Win	Loss	%	GB
**Harrisburg Senators**	88	51	.633	–
Bowie Baysox	84	58	.592	5.5
Canton–Akron Indians	69	73	.486	20.5
Reading Phillies	58	82	.414	30.5
Trenton Thunder	55	85	.393	33.5

Notes:

Green shade indicates that team advanced to the playoffs
Bold indicates that team advanced to ELCS
Italics indicates that team won ELCS

== Playoffs ==
=== Divisional Series ===
==== Northern Division ====
The Binghamton Mets defeated the New Haven Ravens in the Northern Division playoffs 3 games to 0.

==== Southern Division ====
The Harrisburg Senators defeated the Bowie Baysox in the Southern Division playoffs 3 games to 2.

=== Championship series ===
The Binghamton Mets defeated the Harrisburg Senators in the ELCS 3 games to 1.
