= 1986 Eastern League season =

The 1986 Eastern League season began on approximately April 1 and the regular season ended on approximately September 1.

The Vermont Reds defeated the Reading Phillies three games to two to win the Eastern League Championship Series.

== Regular season ==
=== Standings ===
Eastern League
Team	Win	Loss	%	GB
**Reading Phillies**	77	59	.566	–
**Vermont Reds**	77	62	.554	1.5
Pittsfield Cubs	76	64	.543	3.0
Glens Falls Tigers	67	71	.486	11.0
Waterbury Indians	66	73	.475	12.5
Albany/Colonie Yankees	65	74	.468	13.5
New Britain Red Sox	64	73	.467	13.5
Nashua Pirates	62	78	.443	17.0

Notes:

Green shade indicates that team advanced to the playoffs
Bold indicates that team advanced to ELCS
Italics indicates that team won ELCS

== Playoffs ==
=== Semi-finals Series ===
Reading Phillies defeated Glens Falls Tigers 3 games to 1.

Vermont Reds defeated Pittsfield Cubs 3 games to 2.

=== Championship Series ===
Vermont Reds defeated Reading Phillies 3 games to 2.

== Attendance ==
1986 Eastern League	Regular season	Playoffs
**Total attendance**	792,215	12,441
**Total games played**	554	14
**Average attendance per game**	1,430	889
