= USS Remlik =

Steam yacht that became a United States Navy patrol ship

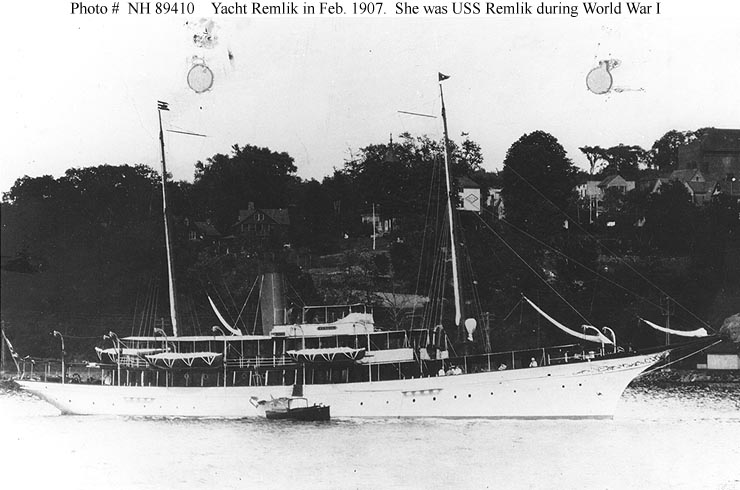
- Remlik in 1907

History
- Name: 1903: Candace; 1907: Remlik
- Namesake: 1907: WS Kilmer
- Owner: 1903: WS Bailey; 1907: WS Kilmer; 1917: United States Navy; 1920: JS Webster
- Port of registry: 1903: (United Kingdom) Hull; 1907: (United States) New York; 1920: (United Kingdom) Kingston, Jamaica
- Builder: Cook, Welton & Gemmell, Hull
- Yard number: 313
- Launched: 19 November 1902
- Completed: March 1903
- Acquired: Bought by US Gov't 1 June 1917; Delivered to USN 10 June 1917
- Commissioned: into US Navy, 11 July 1917
- Decommissioned: from US Navy, 7 November 1919
- Identification: 1903: UK official number 116133; 1903: code letters TWDS; 1917: pennant number SP-157; 1917: code letters GSLK; 1918: call sign KZR; 1920: UK official number 140029; 1930: call sign VPLF
- Fate: Scuttled, 1932

General characteristics
- Type: 1903: steam yacht; 1917: patrol boat; 1920: commercial craft
- Tonnage: 432 GRT, 90 NRT
- Displacement: 600 tons
- Length: 175.0 ft (53.3 m)
- Beam: 23.0 ft (7.0 m)
- Draft: 11 ft 9.6 in (3.60 m)
- Depth: 12.5 ft (3.8 m)
- Installed power: 99 NHP
- Propulsion: 1 × screw; 1 × triple expansion engine
- Speed: 14 knots (26 km/h)
- Complement: as patrol craft: 62
- Armament: 2 × 3-inch/50-caliber guns; 2 × machine guns

USS Remlik (SP-157) (sometimes spelled Remlick) was a steam yacht that was built in England in 1903 as Candace. She was renamed Remlik in 1907 when she changed owners. She was converted into a United States Navy patrol boat in 1917 and served in the First World War. She was decommissioned in 1919, converted into a commercial craft in 1920, and scuttled in 1932.

== Building ==
Cook, Welton & Gemmell of Hull, Yorkshire, built the yacht as yard number 313. She was launched on 19 November 1902 and completed in March 1903. Her registered length was 175.0 ft (53.3 m), her beam was 23.0 ft (7.0 m) and her depth was 12.5 ft (3.8 m). Her tonnages were 432 GRT and 90 NRT.

She had a single screw, driven by a three-cylinder triple expansion engine. It was rated at 99 NHP and gave her a top speed of 14 knots (26 km/h).

== Steam yacht ==
Bailey and Leetham, a Hull shipping company, built Candace's engine. William Bailey of Anlaby was her first owner. He registered her in Hull. Her UK official number was 116133 and her code letters were TWDS.

In April 1907 a US newspaper owner, Willis Kilmer of Binghamton, New York bought Candace. He renamed her Remlik – his own surname spelt in reverse – and registered her in New York.

== Patrol craft ==
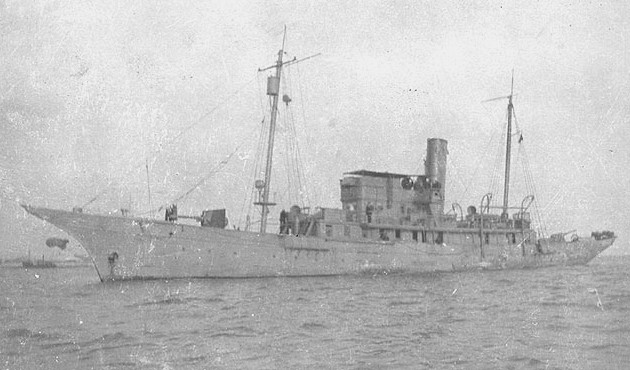
Patrol boat USS Remlik, with her two 3-inch/50-caliber guns visible fore and aft

On 6 April 1917 the US entered the First World War, and on 1 June the Navy Department bought Remlik for conversion into a patrol craft. She was armed with two 3-inch/50-caliber guns and two machine guns. On 10 June she was delivered to the US Navy, and the next day she was commissioned, with the pennant number SP-157 and code letters GSLK. Her first commander in naval service was Lt Cdr Isaac C Johnson Jr.

Remlik crossed the Atlantic to France, where she undertook anti-submarine and coastal patrols in the Bay of Biscay. She served with first the 2nd US Patrol Squadron, and then the 8th.

=== Depth charge incident ===
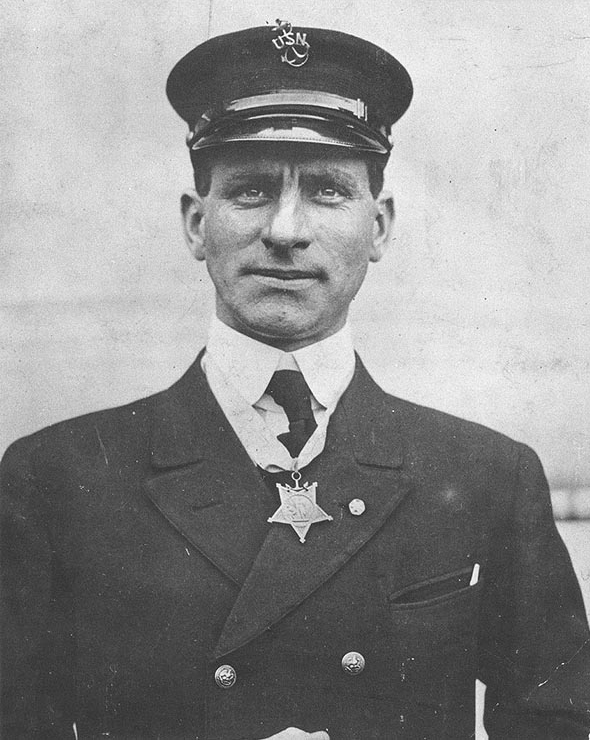
Chief Boatswain's Mate John MacKenzie, MOH, USNRF

On 17 December 1917 Remlik was stalking an enemy submarine in a storm, but the submarine submerged before Remlik could attack. The submarine's periscope appeared three times, but the very heavy sea prevented her from torpedoing Remlik. Remlik remained in the area, making only 2 knots (4 km/h) against the heavy sea, in case the submarine were to reappear.

The heavy sea washed overboard the depth charge box attached to Remlik's taffrail. But the Sperry depth charge fell inboard, lost its safety pin, and began to roll around on deck. Chief Boatswain's Mate John MacKenzie, USNRF ran to the depth charge, and sat on it to keep it from moving, enabling his shipmates to lash it securely to the deck. He was awarded the Medal of Honor for his actions, which probably saved Remlik and her entire crew.

Remlik continued her patrol service, and escorted ships along the French coast, until the end of the First World War. By 1918 her call sign was KZR. After the Armistice of 11 November 1918 she returned to the US. She was decommissioned at Norfolk Naval Shipyard on 7 November 1919.

== Commercial craft ==
On 7 June 1920 a J. S. Webster of Kingston, Jamaica bought Remlik. He had her converted for commercial service, and registered her in Kingston. She was given the new UK official number 140029. By 1930 her wireless telegraph call sign was VPLF. In the second quarter of 1932 she was dismantled, and her hulk was scuttled.

== Sources ==
- "Candace". Shipping and Shipbuilding. Shipping and Shipbuilding Research Trust.
- The Marconi Press Agency Ltd (1918). The Year Book of Wireless Telegraphy and Telephony. London: The Wireless Press, Ltd.
- Mercantile Navy List. London. 1904 – via Crew List Index Project.
- Mercantile Navy List. London. 1921 – via Crew List Index Project.
- Mercantile Navy List. London. 1930 – via Crew List Index Project.
- Radigan, Joseph. "Remlik (SP 157)". NavSource.
- "Remlik (S.P. 157)". DANFS. Naval History and Heritage Command. 1 December 2020.
- Swiggum, Susan; Kohli, Marjorie (5 February 2005). "Bailey & Leetham, Hull". TheShipsList.
