= 1990 Eastern League season =

The 1990 Eastern League season began on approximately April 1 and the regular season ended on approximately September 1.

The London Tigers defeated the New Britain Red Sox three games to zero to win the Eastern League Championship Series.

== Regular season ==
=== Standings ===
Eastern League
Team	Win	Loss	%	GB
Albany/Colonie Yankees	79	60	.568	–
**London Tigers**	76	63	.547	3.0
Canton–Akron Indians	76	64	.543	3.5
**New Britain Red Sox**	72	67	.518	7.0
Harrisburg Senators	69	69	.500	9.5
Hagerstown Suns	67	71	.486	11.5
Williamsport Bills	61	79	.436	18.5
Reading Phillies	55	82	.401	23.0

Notes:

Green shade indicates that team advanced to the playoffs
Bold indicates that team advanced to ELCS
Italics indicates that team won ELCS

== Playoffs ==
=== Semi-finals Series ===
- London Tigers defeated the Canton–Akron Indians 3 games to 2.
- New Britain Red Sox defeated the Albany/Colonie Yankees 3 games to 2.

=== Championship Series ===
- London Tigers defeated the New Britain Red Sox 3 games to 0.
