= Daisytown, Pennsylvania =

Borough in Pennsylvania, US

- Borough
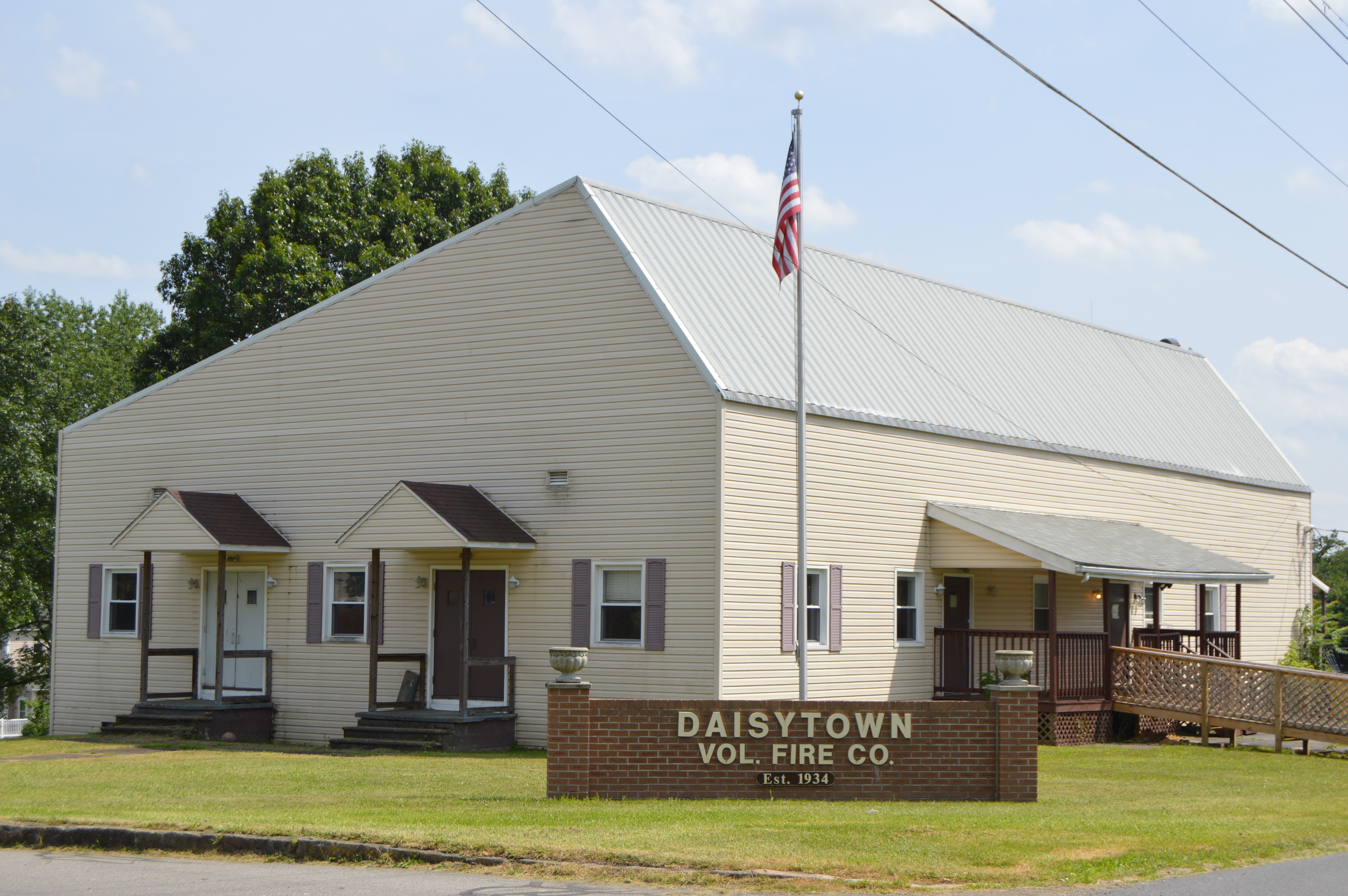
- Fire station on Vogel Street

- Location of Daisytown in Cambria County, Pennsylvania.
- Coordinates: 40°19′11″N 78°54′01″W
- Country: United States
- State: Pennsylvania
- County: Cambria
- Settled: 1776
- Incorporated: 1893

Government
  - Type: Borough council

Area
  - Total: 0.24 sq mi (0.62 km^{2})
  - Land: 0.24 sq mi (0.62 km^{2})
  - Water: 0 sq mi (0.00 km^{2})
- Elevation: 1,778 ft (542 m)

Population (2020)
  - Total: 298
  - Density: 1,252.6/sq mi (483.62/km^{2})
- Time zone: UTC-5 (Eastern (EST))
  - Summer (DST): UTC-4 (EDT)
- ZIP code: 15902
- Area code: 814
- FIPS code: 42-17976
- GNIS feature ID: 1215015

Daisytown is a borough in Cambria County, Pennsylvania, United States. As of the 2020 census, Daisytown had a population of 298.

== Geography ==
Daisytown is located in southwestern Cambria County at 40°19′11″N 78°54′1″W (40.319674, -78.900211). It is bordered to the south and west by the city of Johnstown. Daisytown sits on a hill 600 feet (180 m) above the downtown area of Johnstown.

According to the United States Census Bureau, the borough has a total area of 0.23 square miles (0.6 km^{2}), all land.

== Demographics ==
Historical population
Census	Pop.	Note	%±
1900	435		—
1910	382		−12.2%
1920	414		8.4%
1930	389		−6.0%
1940	386		−0.8%
1950	442		14.5%
1960	388		−12.2%
1970	371		−4.4%
1980	421		13.5%
1990	367		−12.8%
2000	356		−3.0%
2010	326		−8.4%
2020	298		−8.6%

At the 2000 census there were 356 people, 139 households, and 104 families living in the borough. The population density was 1,280.6 inhabitants per square mile (494.4/km^{2}). There were 145 housing units at an average density of 521.6 per square mile (201.4/km^{2}). The racial makeup of the borough was 98.88% White, 0.28% African American, 0.28% Native American, and 0.56% from two or more races. There were 139 households, 30.9% had children under the age of 18 living with them, 64.0% were married couples living together, 7.9% had a female householder with no husband present, and 24.5% were non-families. 20.9% of households were made up of individuals, and 10.1% were one person aged 65 or older. The average household size was 2.56 and the average family size was 2.99.

The age distribution was 22.8% under the age of 18, 5.3% from 18 to 24, 27.5% from 25 to 44, 28.9% from 45 to 64, and 15.4% 65 or older. The median age was 41 years. For every 100 females there were 85.4 males. For every 100 females age 18 and over, there were 89.7 males.

The median household income was $36,667 and the median family income was $38,229. Males had a median income of $26,000 versus $20,000 for females. The per capita income for the borough was $14,736. About 7.5% of families and 7.0% of the population were below the poverty line, including 7.1% of those under age 18 and 6.2% of those age 65 or over.
