= 1995 Eastern League season =

The 1995 Eastern League season began on approximately April 1 and the regular season ended on approximately September 1.

The Reading Phillies defeated the New Haven Ravens 3 games to 2 to win the Eastern League Championship Series.

== Regular season ==
=== Standings ===
Eastern League – Northern Division
Team	Win	Loss	%	GB
Portland Sea Dogs	86	56	.606	–
**New Haven Ravens**	79	63	.556	7.0
Norwich Navigators	70	71	.496	15.5
Binghamton Mets	67	75	.472	19.0
New Britain Rock Cats	65	77	.458	22.5

Eastern League – Southern Division
Team	Win	Loss	%	GB
Trenton Thunder	73	69	.514	–
**Reading Phillies**	73	69	.514	-
Bowie Baysox	68	74	.479	5.0
Canton–Akron Indians	67	75	.472	6.0
Harrisburg Senators	61	80	.433	11.5

Notes:

Green shade indicates that team advanced to the playoffs
Bold indicates that team advanced to ELCS
Italics indicates that team won ELCS

== Playoffs ==
=== Divisional Series ===
==== Northern Division ====
The New Haven Ravens defeated the Portland Sea Dogs in the Northern Division playoffs 3 games to 1.

==== Southern Division ====
The Reading Phillies defeated the Trenton Thunder in the Southern Division playoffs 3 games to 0.

=== Championship series ===
The Reading Phillies defeated the New Haven Ravens in the ELCS 3 games to 2.
