= 1981 Eastern League season =

The 1981 Eastern League season began on approximately April 1 and the regular season ended on approximately September 1.

The Bristol Red Sox defeated the Glens Falls White Sox three games to two to win the Eastern League Championship Series.

== Regular season ==
=== Standings ===
Eastern League - Northern Division
Team	Win	Loss	%	GB
**Glens Falls White Sox**	83	52	.615	–
Holyoke Millers	68	70	.493	16.5
Lynn Sailors	62	76	.449	22.5
Buffalo Bisons	56	81	.409	28.0

Eastern League - Southern Division
Team	Win	Loss	%	GB
**Bristol Red Sox**	79	58	.577	–
Reading Phillies	76	63	.547	4.0
West Haven A's	71	67	.514	8.5
Waterbury Reds	55	83	.399	24.5

Notes:

Green shade indicates that team advanced to the playoffs
Bold indicates that team advanced to ELCS
Italics indicates that team won ELCS

== Playoffs ==
=== Semi-finals Series ===
Bristol Red Sox defeated Reading Phillies 2 games to 0.

=== Championship Series ===
Bristol Red Sox defeated Glens Falls White Sox 3 games to 2.

== Attendance ==
1981 Eastern League	Regular season	Playoffs
**Total attendance**	620,893	10,750
**Total games played**	550	7
**Average attendance per game**	1,129	1,536
