= Holyoke Millers =

Baseball team (1977–1982)

- 1977–1982; Holyoke, Massachusetts

Team logo	Cap insignia

Minor league affiliations
- Class: Double-A (1977–1982)
- League: Eastern League (1977–1982)

Major league affiliations
- Team: California Angels (1981–1982); Milwaukee Brewers (1977–1980)

Minor league titles
- League titles (1): 1980
- Division titles (1): 1980

Team data
- Name: Holyoke Millers (1977–1982)
- Colors: Navy blue, yellow
- Ballpark: Mackenzie Stadium (1977–1982)

The Holyoke Millers were a minor league baseball team located in Holyoke, Massachusetts. The team played in the Eastern League. Their home stadium was Mackenzie Stadium. The Millers played from 1977 to 1982 and was a farm team of the Milwaukee Brewers the first four years and the California Angels the last two years. In 1980, the team won the Eastern League championship.

The nickname 'Millers' was derived from the many paper mills that Holyoke was noted for, especially in the first half of the 20th century.

== 1981 Holyoke Millers ==
Tom Kayser was general manager and was in his second season as an owner of the Millers. Kayser had been with the club since it moved from Pittsfield, Massachusetts in 1977. Jim Saul was the new manager of the Millers, replacing Lee Sigman who had left the club to become manager of the Vancouver Canadians of the Triple-A Pacific Coast League. Like Sigman, Saul had a long history in baseball as both a player, a catcher, and as a coach and manager. Saul was going into his sixth season as a manager when he joined the Holyoke Millers, having made stops in Salinas, California, Midland and El Paso, Texas. Helping Saul with managerial duties were Dave Thomas and Dave Comforti, who were both interns from the University of Massachusetts and completing their course of study in sports management. T.J. Byrne was a trainer for the club in 1981 and came to the Millers from the Pioneer League's Idaho Falls Angels after the 1980 season. As for the 1981 Holyoke Millers roster behind the Plate was Mark Nocciolo who had been with Salinas and Salt Lake in 1980.

12 John Yandle LHP 1980 Hawaii Pacific Coast League

3 Ricky Adams 2B 1980 Salinas California League / El Paso Texas league

22 Mike Brown C/OF 1980 Salinas Cal. League

18 Chris Clark OF/1B 1980 Salinas Cal. League

9 Dennis Gilbert OF 1980 El Paso Tx. League

8 Curt Brown RHP 1980 Salinas Cal. League

26 Jeff Conner LHP 1980 Salinas Cal. League / El Paso Tx. League

16 Lonnie Dugger RHP 1980 Salinas Cal. League / El Paso Tx. League

13 Dave Duran RHP 1980 Salinas Cal. League

20 Rick Foley RHP 1980 Salt Lake City

25 Pat Keedy 3B 1980 Salinas Cal. League / El Paso Tx League

24 Darrell Miller C/OF 1980 Salinas Cal. League/ Salt Lake City

21 Mark Nocciolo C 1980 Salinas Cal. League / Salt Lake City

17 Les Pearsey 1B 1980 Orlando / Toledo International League

15 Gary Pettis OF 1980 Salinas Cal. League

14 Gus Polidor SS -rookie for 1981-

27 Brandt Humphry RHP 1980 El Paso *note played third base*

5 Bill Mooneyham RHP 1980 Salinas Cal. League

23 Perry Morrison RHP 1980 Salinas Cal. League/El Paso Tx. League

30 Dennis Rasmussen LHP 1980 Salinas Cal. League

19 Rick Rommell RHP 1980 El Paso Tx League

1 Ed Rodriguez Ult.INF 1980 Redwood Cal. League

=== Roster Notes ===
Note that the 1981 Millers roster had:

- Gary Pettis who would go on to play for the Angels, Tigers, Rangers and Padres.
- Dennis Rasmussen who would go on to play for the Padres, Yankees, Reds, Cubs and the Royals.
- Pat Keedy would go on to bounce around in the minor leagues after leaving Holyoke seeing playing time with the Edmonton Trappers of the PCL and Midland of the Texas League in 1986, then in 1987 he played with the Hawaii Islanders of the PCL and the Chicago White Sox. In 1988 he joined the Tucson Toros of the PCL.
- Bill Mooneyham would play one season in the majors with the Oakland A's in 1986.
- Ricky Adams played briefly with the Angels and SF Giants.
- Mike Brown played 5 seasons with the Angels and Pirates.
- Darrell Miller played 5 seasons with the Angels.
  - He is the brother of basketball stars Cheryl Miller and Reggie Miller.
- Jim Saul is a retired minor league coach, having managed in the Atlanta Braves farm systems from 1989–2002.

== Sources ==
- Note this information was taken from the 1981 team set by TCMA.
