= Municipal Stadium (Waterbury) =

Stadium in Waterbury, Connecticut

- Interactive map of Municipal Stadium
- Location: 1200 Watertown Avenue, Waterbury, CT 06708
- Coordinates: 41.577784°N 73.070186°W
- Capacity: 6,000
- Surface: Grass
- Field size: Left field: 325 feet Center field: 400 feet Right field: 325 feet

Construction
- Opened: 1930

Tenants
- Waterbury MiLB (EL) (1884-1888, 1891, 1894-1895, 1897-1902, 1906-1914, 1918-1928, 1947-1950, 1966-1971, 1973-1986); Waterbury Spirit (Northeast League) (1997-2000)

Municipal Stadium is a stadium in Waterbury, Connecticut, United States. The stadium was built in 1930 originally as a dog track which attributes to its unique layout. It holds 6,000 people.

== History ==
The stadium was home to minor league baseball for the majority of its existence, beginning in 1947 with the Colonial League and from 1966 to 1986 with the AA Eastern League as an affiliate of the Dodgers, Reds, Giants, Indians, Pirates, A's, and Angels. The stadium has been home to a few historic events. Women's softball pitcher Joan Joyce struck out Ted Williams, Dom DiMaggio, and Johnny Pesky, in order, in the stadium, and in 1947 several members of the New York Yankees including Joe DiMaggio, Yogi Berra, Phil Rizzuto, and Spec Shea, played an exhibition game against the Waterbury Timers in the stadium.

From 1984 until 1991, the stadium hosted the AABC Mickey Mantle World Series for 15-16 year-old teams from the U.S., Canada and Puerto Rico. Future Major League stars including Hall of Famer Ken Griffey Jr., 14-time All-Star Alex Rodriguez, Mike Lowell, Nomar Garciaparra, Chuck Knoblauch, Brad Ausmus, Adam Hyzdu, and Mark Newfield all played in the tournament over the years.

The stadium hosted NCAA Division I regional baseball games from 1988 to 1990 including an epic matchup between UConn and Georgia in 1990 when Georgia went on to win the national championship.

In modern times, the stadium has played host to the Waterbury franchise of the New England Collegiate Baseball League between 1994 and 1996. In 1997, the stadium became home to the Waterbury Spirit which spent four seasons in the independent Northern League. In 2004 the Connecticut Hammers, a professional soccer franchise owned by Peter Carli, unsuccessfully attempted to convert the stadium to a soccer-only facility.

== Current status ==
It is now primarily used for sporting events, primarily football and baseball, for most of the city's high schools and youth leagues. In 2017, the stadium also hosted the AABC Mickey Mantle World Series for 15-16 year old teams from across the United States, Puerto Rico, and Canada. A multi-purpose turf field/stadium has been built alongside the baseball field. The stadium is designed more like a football arena, as opposed to a baseball field, but has two smaller baseball/softball fields at each end of the field. The original baseball field has a majority of the stadium's uncovered seating along the first base line.

In February 2009, Stamford, Connecticut's The Advocate reported growing concerns among state lawmakers over the US economy, and the governing of state and local funds for maintaining and improving local stadiums such as Waterbury.
