= 1983 Eastern League season =

The 1983 Eastern League season began on approximately April 1 and the regular season ended on approximately September 1.

The New Britain Red Sox defeated the Lynn Sailors three games to one to win the Eastern League Championship Series.

== Regular season ==
=== Standings ===
Eastern League
Team	Win	Loss	%	GB
Reading Phillies	96	44	.686	–
**Lynn Pirates**	77	62	.554	18.5
Buffalo Bisons	74	65	.532	21.5
**New Britain Red Sox**	72	67	.518	23.5
Albany/Colonie A's	63	73	.463	31.0
Nashua Angels	60	80	.429	36.0
Waterbury Reds	59	80	.424	36.5
Glens Falls White Sox	53	83	.390	41.0

Notes:

Green shade indicates that team advanced to the playoffs
Bold indicates that team advanced to ELCS
Italics indicates that team won ELCS

== Playoffs ==
=== Semi-finals Series ===
Lynn Sailors defeated Buffalo Bisons 2 games to 0.

New Britain Red Sox defeated Reading Phillies 2 games to 1.

=== Championship Series ===
New Britain Red Sox defeated Lynn Sailors 3 games to 1.

== Attendance ==
1983 Eastern League	Regular season	Playoffs
**Total attendance**	909,015	16,581
**Total games played**	554	9
**Average attendance per game**	1,641	1,842
