= 1985 Eastern League season =

The 1985 Eastern League season began on approximately April 1 and the regular season ended on approximately September 1.

The Vermont Reds defeated the New Britain Red Sox three games to one to win the Eastern League Championship Series.

== Regular season ==
=== Standings ===
Eastern League
Team	Win	Loss	%	GB
Albany/Colonie Yankees	82	57	.590	–
Waterbury Indians	75	64	.540	7.0
**New Britain Red Sox**	75	64	.540	7.0
**Vermont Reds**	71	67	.514	10.5
Glens Falls White Sox	68	71	.489	14.0
Nashua Pirates	66	73	.475	16.0
Pittsfield Cubs	59	79	.428	22.5
Reading Phillies	58	79	.423	23.0

Notes:

Green shade indicates that team advanced to the playoffs
Bold indicates that team advanced to ELCS
Italics indicates that team won ELCS

== Playoffs ==
=== Semi-finals Series ===
New Britain Red Sox defeated Waterbury Indians 3 games to 1.

Vermont Reds defeated Albany/Colonie Yankees 3 games to 1.

=== Championship Series ===
Vermont Reds defeated New Britain Red Sox 3 games to 1.

== Attendance ==
1985 Eastern League	Regular season	Playoffs
**Total attendance**	823,132	16,380
**Total games played**	554	12
**Average attendance per game**	1,486	1,365
