= List of baseball parks in New Haven, Connecticut =

List of professional baseball parks in New Haven, Connecticut, USA

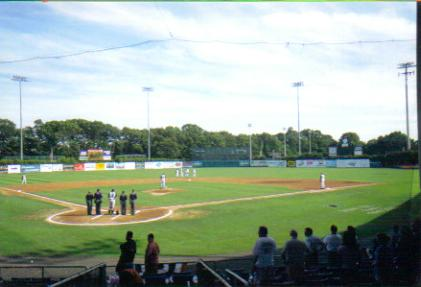
Yale Field in 2003

This is a list of venues used for professional baseball in New Haven, Connecticut. The information is a synthesis of the information contained in the references listed.

Howard Avenue Grounds
Home of:

Elm City – National Association (1875 only – all but one game)
Hartford Dark Blues – National League (1877 one game)
New Haven Elm City – Eastern League (1887 only)
New Haven – Atlantic Association (1889–1890)
New Haven Nutmegs – Eastern Association / Eastern League (1891–1892)

Location:Howard Avenue (west, home plate); Spring Street (north, left field); Cedar Street (east, center field); railroad tracks (south, right field)
Currently: residential

Hamilton Park race track, orig. Brewster Park (1859–1861), then Elm City Driving Park in December 1888
Home of:

Elm City – NA (1875 only – one game)

New Haven Bluebirds aka Edgewoods – Naugatuck Valley League (1898)

Location: Whalley Avenue and what is now West Park Avenue
Currently: residences and Edgewood Park

Yale Field
Home of:

Yale University Bulldogs first opened 1885
New Haven Ravens – Eastern League (1994–2003)
New Haven County Cutters – Canadian American Association of Professional Baseball (2004–2007)

Location: West Haven, Connecticut 252 Derby Avenue (north, home plate); Yale Avenue / Marginal Drive (east, left field)

Donovan Field (so named in 1931) orig. Savin Rock Grounds, then Weiss Park (II)
Home of:

New Haven Edgewoods – Connecticut League (1894 only – league disbanded mid-season)
New Haven Texas Steers – Atlantic League (1896 only – part-season)
New Haven Blues / Black Crows / Prairie Hens / Murlins – Connecticut League (1899–1908)
New Haven White Wings / Weissmen – Eastern Association (1913–1914) / Colonial League (1915) / Eastern League (1916–1919)
New Haven Weissmen / Profs – Eastern League (1928 – mid-1930 disbanded)
New Haven Bulldogs – Eastern League (1931 – mid-1932 – league disbanded mid-season)

Location: West Haven, Connecticut – 50 Oak Street (northeast, third base); Captain Thomas Boulevard (northwest, first base)
Currently: vacant lot

Lighthouse Point Park
Used during about 1910 through 1920 by various New Haven teams for Sundays and exhibition games due to blue laws within the city of New Haven
Location: just east of Five Mile Point Light
Currently: public park

Weiss Park (I) (for club owner George Weiss)
Home of: New Haven Weissmen / Indians / Profs – Eastern League (1920–1927)
Location: Hamden, Connecticut – east of Dixwell Avenue, between Helen Street (north) and Wooding/Woodin Street (south)

stands disassembled and moved to Savin Rock for 1928

Currently: commercial businesses

== See also ==
- Lists of baseball parks
