= Winsted Welcomes =

Minor league baseball team

- 1896; Winsted, Connecticut

Minor league affiliations
- Class: Independent (1896)
- League: Naugatuck Valley League (1896)

Major league affiliations
- Team: None

Minor league titles
- League titles (0): None

Team data
- Name: Winsted Welcomes (1896)
- Ballpark: Unknown (1896)

The Winsted Welcomes were a minor league baseball team based in Winsted, Connecticut. The Winsted Welcomes played the 1896 season as members of the Independent level Naugatuck Valley League.

== History ==
Minor league baseball began in Winsted, Connecticut in 1896, when the Winsted "Welcomes" became members of the six–team Independent level Naugatuck Valley League. With league founder Jim O'Rourke helping organize the league teams, Winsted and the Naugatuck Valley League teams began play on May 6, 1896.

A Baseball Hall of Fame member, Jim O'Rourke was owner/player/manager for the Bridgeport team. after returning to his hometown of Bridgeport upon ending his major league career, O'Rourke was instrumental in forming both the Bridgeport team and the other league members franchises.

The Winsted Welcomes began play in the Naugatuck Valley League in 1896. The other charter members of the league were the Ansonia Blues from Ansonia, Connecticut, Bridgeport Victors from Bridgeport, Connecticut, the Derby Angels from Derby, Connecticut, the New Haven Edgewoods from New Haven, Connecticut and the Torrington Tornadoes from Torrington, Connecticut. The 1896 team was also referred to as the "Winsted Blues"

In their only season of play, the Winsted Welcomes finished in 5th place, playing under managers Eugene McCarthy, W. A. Parsons and James Eaton. The final Naugatuck Valley League standings were led by the 1st place Bridgeport Victors with a 25–15 record. Bridgeport finished 1.0 games ahead of the 2nd place Torrington Tornados (24–17), followed by the Derby Angels (22–18), New Haven Edgewoods (22–18), Winsted Welcomes (15–25) and Ansonia Blues (12–28). Winsted finished 10.0 games behind 1st place Bridgeport in the final standings.

After the 1896 season, with Jim O'Rourke organizing the league, three Naugatuck Valley League teams continued play as members of the renamed 1897 Connecticut League, but the Winsted franchise was not a member of the new six–team league.

Winsted, Connecticut has not hosted another minor league team.

== The ballpark ==
The name of the 1896 Winsted Welcomes' home minor league ballpark is unknown.

== Year–by–year record ==
Year	Record	Finish	Manager	Playoffs/Notes
1896	15–25	5th	Eugene McCarthy / W. A. Parsons / James Eaton	No playoffs held

== Notable alumni ==
- Mike Hickey (1896)
- John Stafford (1896)

== See also ==
Winsted Welcomes players
