= Torrington Tornadoes =

- 1896–1897; Torrington, Connecticut

Minor league affiliations
- Class: Independent (1896); Class F (1897)
- League: Naugatuck Valley League (1896); Connecticut League (1897)

Major league affiliations
- Team: None

Minor league titles
- League titles (0): None

Team data
- Name: Torrington Tornadoes (1896); Torrington Demons (1897)
- Ballpark: Unknown (1896–1897)

The Torrington Tornadoes were a minor league baseball team based in Torrington, Connecticut. Torrington played the 1896 season as members of the Independent level Naugatuck Valley League, followed the next season by the 1897 Torrington Demons, playing in the Class F level Connecticut League.

Baseball Hall of Fame member Candy Cummings was manager of the 1896 Torrington Tornadoes.

== History ==
Minor league baseball began in Torrington, Connecticut in 1896. The Torrington "Tornadoes" became members of the six–team Independent level Naugatuck Valley League. With league founder Jim O'Rourke helping organize the league teams, Winsted and the Naugatuck Valley League teams began play on May 6, 1896.

A Baseball Hall of Fame member, Jim O'Rourke was owner/player/manager for the Bridgeport team. after returning to his hometown of Bridgeport upon ending his major league career, O'Rourke was instrumental in forming both the Bridgeport team and the other league members franchises.

The Torrington use of the "Tornadoes" moniker corresponds to local weather patterns. There have been nearly 50 recorded tornado events in Torrington, Connecticut.

The Torrington Tornadoes began minor league play in the 1896 Naugatuck Valley League. The other charter members of the league were the Ansonia Blues from Ansonia, Connecticut Bridgeport Victors from Bridgeport, Connecticut, the Derby Angels from Derby, Connecticut, the New Haven Edgewoods from New Haven, Connecticut the and Winsted Welcomes from Winsted, Connecticut, with league play beginning May 6, 1896.

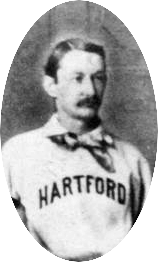
(1875) Baseball Hall of Fame member Candy Cummings. Cummings managed the second place Torrington Tornadoes in 1886.

In their first season of minor league play, the Torrington Tornadoes finished in second place, playing under managers Tom Burns and Baseball Hall of Fame member Candy Cummings. The final Naugatuck Valley League standings were led by the first place Bridgeport Victors with a 25–15 record. Bridgeport finished 1.0 game ahead of the second place Torrington Tornados (24–17), followed by the Derby Angels (22–18), New Haven Edgewoods (22–18), Winsted Welcomes (15–25) and Ansonia Blues (12–28). Pitcher Lee Viau of Torrington led the league with 15 wins.

The Torrington Demons continued play in a newly named league in 1897. With Jim O'Rourke organizing the league, three Naugatuck Valley League teams continued play as members of the renamed 1897 six–team Class F level Connecticut League. Torrington joined the Bridgeport Soubrettes, Bristol Braves, Derby Angels, Meriden Bulldogs and waterbury Indians in league play. With a record of 31–39, the Demons placed fourth in the final standings. Playing under managers Ralph Bottenus and Dennis Houle, Torrington finished 16.0 games behind the first place Meriden Bulldogs in the standings.

After a decades long absence, minor league baseball returned to Torrington in 1950, when the Torrington Braves played the season as members of the Class B level Colonial League.

== The ballpark ==
The name of the home minor league ballpark in Torrington in 1896 and 1897 is unknown.

== Timeline ==
| Year(s) | # Yrs. | Team | Level | League |
|---|---|---|---|---|
| 1896 | 1 | Torrington Tornadoes | Independent | Naugatuck Valley League |
| 1897 | 1 | Torrington Demons | Class F | Connecticut League |

== Year–by–year record ==
| Year | Record | Finish | Manager | Playoffs/notes |
|---|---|---|---|---|
| 1896 | 24–16 | 2nd | Tom Burns / Candy Cummings | No playoffs held |
| 1897 | 31–39 | 4th | Ralph Bottenus / Dennis Houle | No playoffs held |

== Notable alumni ==
- Candy Cummings (1896) Inducted, Baseball Hall of Fame, 1939
- Larry Battam (1896)
- Mike Hickey (1897)
- John Hofford (1896)
- Art Nichols (1896)
- Jack Rafter (1896)
- Lee Viau (1896)
- Willie Mills (1897)

== See also ==
- Torrington Demons players
- Torrington Tornadoes players
