= Lighthouse Point =

Lighthouse Point may refer to:

- Lighthouse Point, Florida, a city in Broward County, Florida, United States
- Lookout Cay at Lighthouse Point, a private peninsula owned by Disney Cruise Line in Eleuthera, Bahamas
- Lighthouse Point Lighthouse, a lighthouse in Beaver Harbour, New Brunswick, Canada
- Lighthouse Point Park, a park in New Haven, Connecticut, United States
  - Lighthouse Point Carousel, located in Lighthouse Point Park
- Lighthouse Point (Cedar Point), a resort owned by Cedar Point in Sandusky, Ohio, United States

== See also ==
- St. George Coast Guard Station, which includes a development project called Lighthouse Point - Staten Island, New York, United States
