= Bugs Reisigl =

American baseball player (1887-1957)

- Pitcher
- Born: December 12, 1887; Brooklyn, New York, U.S.
- Died: September 28, 1957 (aged 69); Amsterdam, New York, U.S.
- Batted: Right Threw: Right

MLB debut
- September 20, 1911, for the Cleveland Naps

Last MLB appearance
- September 28, 1911, for the Cleveland Naps

MLB statistics
- Win–loss record: 0–1
- Earned run average: 6.23
- Strikeouts: 6
- Stats at Baseball Reference

Teams
- Cleveland Naps (1911)

Jacob "Bugs" Reisigl (December 12, 1887 – February 24, 1957) was an American Major League Baseball pitcher who played for one season. He pitched in two games for the Cleveland Naps during the 1911 Cleveland Naps season.

Reisigl began his professional career with the New Haven club of the Connecticut State League in 1909. Reisigl clashed with management and teammates throughout his time in New Haven. In June 1909, he was suspended indefinitely by manager George Bone because he had "been acting badly for a week" and "talking as bad as he acted." The suspension was intended to allow him time "to sober off." After he returned to the team that summer, he was beat up by teammates when captain Elmer Zacher caught him fraternizing with the opposing team. The following June, manager Bill Carrick suspended him again for insubordination after he refused to travel with the team for a series in Hartford.

In August 1911, the Cleveland Naps agreed to buy Reisigl's contract from New Haven for $3,000 (equivalent to $104,000 in 2025) and to send them a pitcher and catcher on whom they would spend another $1,500. After the end of New Haven's season, Reisigl made his Major League debut on September 21, 1911 at Hilltop Park against the New York Yankees. With Vice President of the United States James S. Sherman in attendance and fellow rookie Steve O'Neill behind the plate, Reisigl pitched well until allowing a sixth-inning home run to Hal Chase. The game was ended after the seventh inning due to darkness and Reisigl took the loss. Nonetheless, The Bridgeport Times and Evening Farmer reported that manager George Stovall "favorably commented on" his pitching. He pitched his second and final Major League on September 28, throwing the final six innings in relief of Gene Krapp in a loss to the Philadelphia Athletics at Shibe Park.

In December 1911, it was reported that Cleveland would be returning Reisigl to New Haven. New Haven's owner, George Cameron, spoke openly to the press about his mixed feelings about Reisigl's return. He said, "He is too eccentric. If I get a chance to sell him I will sell him. And then again I may keep him." Reisigl fired back in an open letter before the start of the season, writing "I wouldn't sign a contract for Cameron for a salary of $500 per month, as I know that he would suspend me and get it all back again, that is why I call him the cheapest manager for whom I ever played ball." Before the end of April, however, he did report to the team. He did not comment on his earlier open letter, instead saying, "Mr. Cameron and I are the warmest friends."
