= Brewster Park =

Brewster Park may refer to:

- Hamilton Park (New Haven), formerly Brewster Park, a former sports venue located in New Haven, Connecticut
- Brewster Park (Enniskillen), a Gaelic sports ground in Enniskillen, Northern Ireland
