= Naugatuck Valley League (baseball) =

Minor basketball league

- Formerly: Connecticut State League (1895)
- Classification: Independent (1896)
- Sport: Minor League Baseball
- Founder: Jim O'Rourke
- First season: 1896
- Folded: September 26, 1896
- Replaced by: Connecticut State League (1897)
- President: D.W. Porter (1896)
- No. of teams: 6
- Country: United States of America
- Most titles: 1 Bridgeport Victors (1896)

The Naugatuck Valley League was a minor league baseball league that played in the 1896 season. The Non-Signatory Independent level league consisted of franchises based exclusively in Connecticut. The six–team league evolved into the 1897 Connecticut League.

Baseball Hall of Fame member Candy Cummings managed the 1896 Torrington Tornados team in the Naugatuck Valley League. Fellow Hall of Fame member Jim O'Rourke was the Naugatuck Valley League founder and owner/player/manager for the Bridgeport Victors team while leading the league in batting average.

Today, the league name has been adopted by the high school athletic Naugatuck Valley League, based in Connecticut.

== History ==
Formed for the 1896 season, with league founder Jim O'Rourke helping organize the league teams, the Naugatuck Valley League began play on May 6, 1896, as a six–team league. The Naugatuck Valley League was a Non-Signatory Independent level league under the direction of league president D.W. Porter.

The league name derived from the location of member teams within the Naugatuck River Valley region in Connecticut.

The Naugatuck Valley League vegan minor league play in 1896. The six charter members were the Ansonia Blues based in Ansonia, Connecticut, the Bridgeport Victors from Bridgeport, Connecticut, the Derby Angels from Derby, Connecticut, the New Haven Edgewoods from New Haven, Connecticut, the Torrington Tornadoes from Torrington, Connecticut and Winsted Welcomes from Winsted, Connecticut.

The Naugatuck Valley League standings were led by the first place Bridgeport Victors with a 25–15 record. Bridgeport finished 1.0 games ahead of the second place Torrington Tornados (24–17), followed by the Derby Angels (22–18), New Haven Edgewoods (22–18), Winsted Welcomes (15–25) and Ansonia Blues (12–28). After the season, the Naugatuck Valley League permanently folded, playing only the 1896 season. Baseball Hall of Fame member Candy Cummings was a manager for the Torrington Tornados team.

Baseball Hall of Fame member Jim O'Rourke was owner/player/manager for the Bridgeport team, leading the 1896 Bridgeport Victors to the Naugatuck Valley League championship as a manager and leading the league with a .437 batting average, playing catcher at age 46. O'Rourke had been instrumental in forming both the Bridgeport franchise and the league itself after returning to his hometown of Bridgeport upon ending his major league career. O'Rourke graduated from the nearby Yale Law School in 1887, this after negotiating payment of the college tuition into his major league contract. O'Rourke continued minor league play for Bridgeport teams aging into his late 50's and was a practicing attorney. On July 1, 1903 was joined by his son Jimmy O’Rourke in the lineup for the Bridgeport Orators of the Class D level Connecticut State League, becoming the first known father and son duo to play together in an organized professional baseball game.

After the 1896 season, with Jim O'Rourke still organizing the league, four of the Naugatuck Valley League teams continued play as members of the renamed 1897 Connecticut State League. The Bridgeport, Derby, Torrington and Winstead teams continued play in the new league, joined by Bristol and Meriden teams.

Today, the league name has been revived by the high school athletic Naugatuck Valley League. The league has 16-member high schools, all based in Connecticut.

== Naugatuck Valley League franchises ==
Team name	City represented	Ballpark	Year(s) active
Ansonia Blues	Ansonia, CT	Unknown	1896
Bridgeport Victors	Bridgeport, CT	Unknown	1896
Derby Angels	Derby, CT	Unknown	1896
New Haven Edgewoods	New Haven, CT	Howard Avenue Grounds	1896
Torrington Tornadoes	Torrington, CT	Unknown	1896
Winsted Welcomes	Winsted, CT	Unknown	1896

== Standings & statistics ==
=== 1896 Naugatuck Valley League ===
Team standings	W	L	PCT	GB	Managers
Bridgeport Victors	25	15	.625	–	Jim O'Rourke
Torrington Tornados	24	16	.600	1	T.M. Burns / Candy Cummings
Derby Angels	22	18	.550	3	William Callahan / Joseph Veitch
New Haven Edgewoods	22	18	.550	3	T.R. Greist
Winsted Welcomes	15	25	.375	10	Eugene McCarthy; W.A. Parsons / James Eaton
Ansonia Blues	12	28	.300	13	Thomas Houlihan

Player statistics
Player	Team	Stat	Tot	Player	Team	Stat	Tot
Jim O'Rourke	Bridgeport	BA	.437	Dick Mansfield; Lee Viau	Bridgeport; Torrington	W	15; 15
John Doherty; Pop Foster	Bridgeport; Bridgeport	Runs	50; 50	Dick Mansfield	Bridgeport	SO	127
John Doherty	Bridgeport	Hits	70	Dick Mansfield	Bridgeport	ERA	1.95
Thomas Ivers	Bridgeport	HR	5	Dick Mansfield; Lee Viau	Bridgeport; Torrington	PCT	.682 15-7.682 15–7

=== Baseball Hall of Fame alumni ===
- Candy Cummings, Torrington. Inducted, 1939
- Jim O'Rourke, Bridgeport. Inducted, 1945
