= Ansonia Blues =

- 1896; Ansonia, Connecticut

Minor league affiliations
- Class: Independent (1896)
- League: Naugatuck Valley League (1896)

Major league affiliations
- Team: None

Minor league titles
- League titles (0): None

Team data
- Name: Ansonia Blues (1896)
- Ballpark: Unknown (1896)

The Ansonia Blues were a minor league baseball team based in Ansonia, Connecticut. In 1896, the Blues played as members of the Independent level Naugatuck Valley League. The Ansonia Blues were preceded in Ansonia by the Ansonia Cuban Giants.

== History ==
Previous to the Blues, Ansonia had hosted the Ansonia Cuban Giants who integrated the Connecticut State League, playing in the 1888 and 1891 seasons.

The Ansonia "Blues" became members of the Independent level Naugatuck Valley League in 1896. Formed for the 1896 season, with league founder Jim O'Rourke helping organize the league teams, Ansonia and the Naugatuck Valley League teams began play on May 6, 1896, as a six–team league.

A Baseball Hall of Fame inductee, Jim O'Rourke was owner/player/manager for the Bridgeport team, and was instrumental in forming both the Bridgeport franchise and the league members themselves after returning to his hometown of Bridgeport upon ending his major league career.

As the Ansonia Blues began play with Naugatuck Valley League in 1896, the other charter members were the Bridgeport Victors from Bridgeport, Connecticut, the Derby Angels from Derby, Connecticut, the New Haven Edgewoods from New Haven, Connecticut, the Torrington Tornadoes from Torrington, Connecticut and Winsted Welcomes from Winsted, Connecticut. Some references refer to the 1896 team as the "Antonia Welcomes."

The Ansonia Blues finished the 1896 season in sixth place, placing last in the six–team league, while playing the season under manager Thomas Houlihan. The final Naugatuck Valley League standings were led by the first place Bridgeport Victors with a 25–15 record. Bridgeport finished 1.0 games ahead of the second place Torrington Tornados (24–17), followed by the Derby Angels (22–18), New Haven Edgewoods (22–18), Winsted Welcomes (15–25) and Ansonia Blues (12–28). Ansonia finished 13.0 games behind Bridgeport in the final standings.

After the 1896 season, with Jim O'Rourke still organizing the league, four Naugatuck Valley League teams continued play as members of the renamed 1897 Connecticut League. The Bridgeport, Derby, Torrington and Winstead teams continued play, adding Bristol and Meriden teams. The Ansonia franchise did not continue play in the new league.

Ansonia, Connecticut has not hosted another minor league team.

== The ballpark ==
The name of the 1896 Ansonia Blues' home minor league ballpark is not referenced.

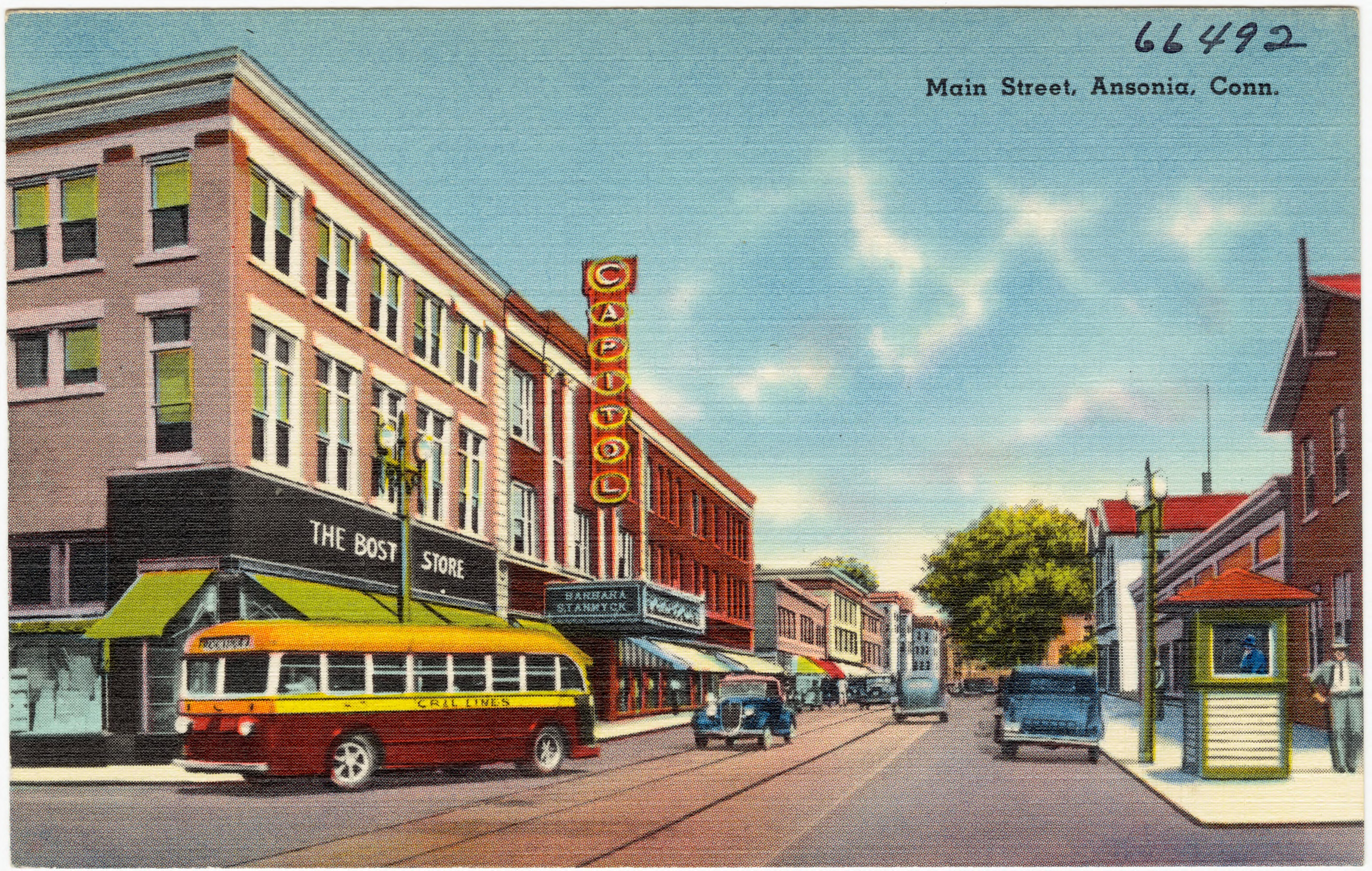
(1930) Main Street. Ansonia, Connecticut

== Timeline ==
Year(s)	# Yrs.	Team	Level	League
1888, 1891	2	Ansonia Cuban Giants	Independent	Connecticut State League
1896	1	Ansonia Blues	Independent	Naugatuck Valley League

== Year–by–year records ==
Year	Record	Finish	Manager	Playoffs/Notes
1896	12–28	6th	Thomas Houlihan	None held

== Notable alumni ==
- Ed Carfrey (1896)
- Ansonia Blues players
