= Hamilton Park (New Haven) =

Stadium in New Haven, Connecticut

Coordinates: 41.3224°N 72.9542°W

Hamilton Park, originally known as Brewster Park and later as Elm City Park, was a sports venue in New Haven, Connecticut, located at the intersection of Whalley Avenue and what is now West Park Avenue.

The first newspaper mention of Brewster Park was in the later winter of 1858-1859.

In the spring of 1861, the venue was renamed to Hamilton Park.

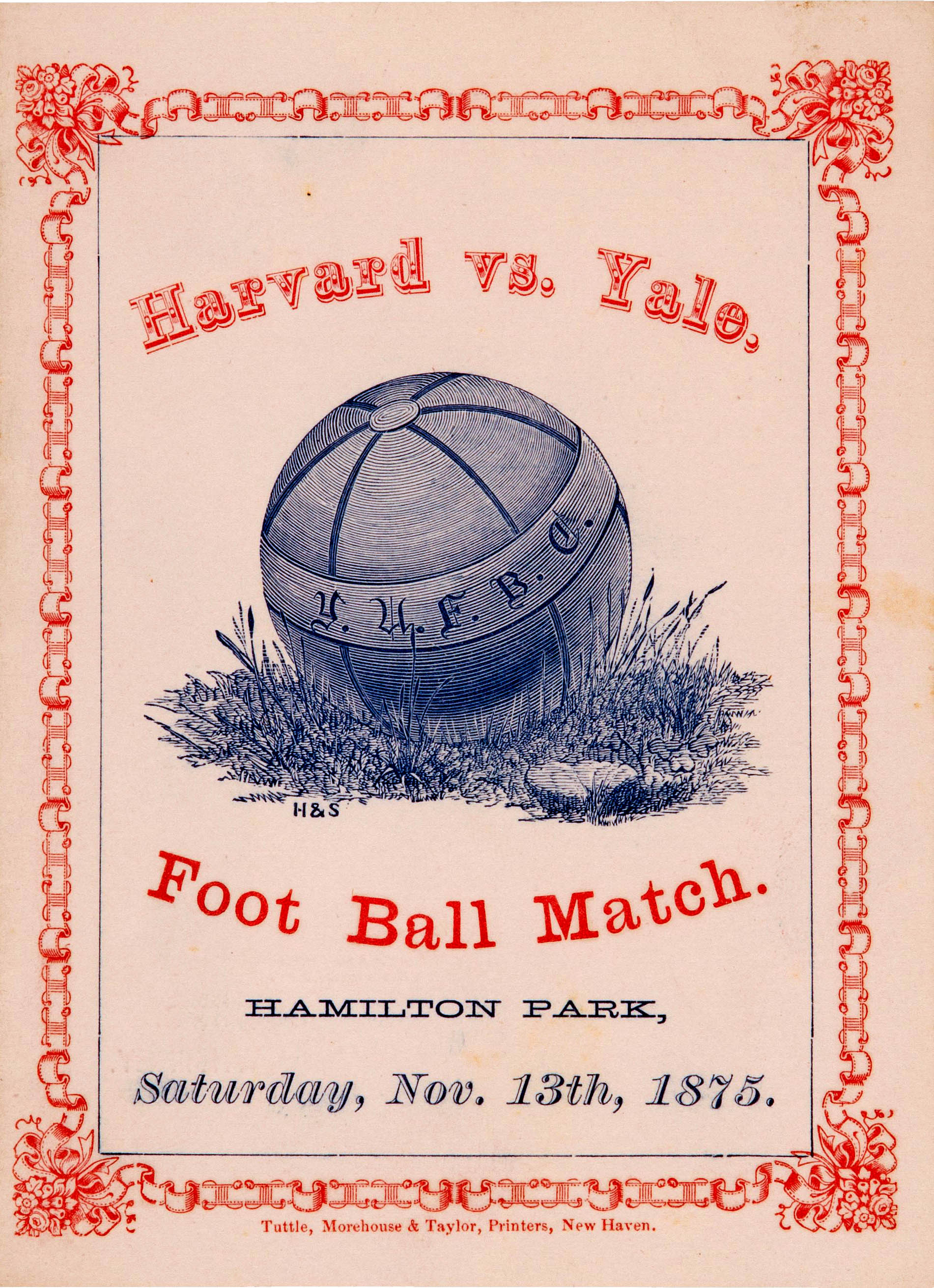
Program for the first Yale vs. Harvard football game, in 1875

Hamilton Park hosted Yale University sports competitions in the 19th century. It was the first home field for Yale's football team, used from 1870 until Yale Field was acquired in the 1880s.

The park hosted horse races and was home for one game played by the New Haven Elm Citys baseball team of the National Association during the 1875 season. It is considered a major league ballpark by those who count the National Association as a major league. The Elm City club's normal home field was the Howard Avenue Grounds.

In the autumn of 1888, new owners renamed Hamilton Park again, as Elm City Driving Park.

The park was used by the New Haven Blues minor league baseball team in 1897 and 1898.

The race track was sold to developers and its structures were demolished by early 1913. The location is now occupied partly by residences and partly by Edgewood Park.
