= New Haven Blues (baseball) =

- 1887–1908; (1878, 1885, 1887, 1889–1892, 1896, 1898–1910); New Haven, Connecticut

Minor league affiliations
- Class: Independent (1878, 1885, 1887, 1889–1890, 1892, 1896); Class A (1891, 1896); Class F (1898–1901); Class D (1902–1904); Class B (1905–1910)
- League: International Association (1878); Southern New England League (1885); Eastern League (1887); Atlantic Association (1889–1890); Eastern Association (1891); Eastern League (1892); Connecticut State League (1894); Naugatuck Valley League (1896); Atlantic League (1896); Connecticut State League (1898–1910)

Major league affiliations
- Team: None

Minor league titles
- League titles (3): 1890; 1899; 1902

Team data
- Name: New Haven (1884, 1889–1890); New Haven Blues (1887); New Haven Nutmegs (1891–1892); New Haven Texas Steers (1896); New Haven Edgewoods (1896); New Haven Blues (1898–1908); New Haven Black Crows (1909); New Haven Prairie Hens (1910)
- Ballpark: Howard Avenue Grounds

The New Haven Blues were an early minor league baseball team based in New Haven, Connecticut. The New Haven "Blues" teams played as members of the Connecticut State League from 1899 to 1908, winning league championships in 1899 and 1902.

Earlier New Haven minor league teams played under various nicknames as members of numerous leagues. New Haven began minor league play in 1878 as members of the International Association. They were followed by minor league teams who played as members of the Southern New England League (1885), Eastern League (1887), Atlantic Association (1889–1890), Eastern Association (1891), Eastern League (1892), Connecticut State League (1894), Naugatuck Valley League (1896) and Atlantic League (1896). New Haven won the 1890 Atlantic Association league championship.

The early New Haven teams all hosted their home minor league games at the Howard Avenue Grounds.

Baseball Hall of Fame members Roger Connor and Candy Cummings both played for 1878 New Haven team, the first minor league team hosted in the city. 23 years later, Roger Connor later returned to play for the 1901 New Haven Blues at age 43.

== History ==
=== Early teams – Hall of Fame players ===
New Haven, Connecticut was first was home to professional baseball in 1875 when the New Haven Elm Citys played one season as members of the major league National Association and hosted home games at the Howard Avenue Grounds.

After the 1875 major league team, minor league baseball play began in New Haven in 1878. The "New Haven" team briefly played in the International Association. The team began the season based in New Bedford, before moving to New Haven and eventually ending the season in Hartford, Connecticut. The team moved from New Haven to Hartford on May 20. 1878.

The 1878 New Haven team had two Baseball Hall of Fame members on their roster. At age 20, hall of famer Roger Connor made his professional debut with the 1878 team. Fellow Hall of Fame member Candy Cummings was also a member of the 1878 team while playing his final professional season at as a player at age 29. The team had a 1–11 record and were expelled from the league on June 20, 1878. The International Association did not resume play after the 1878 season.

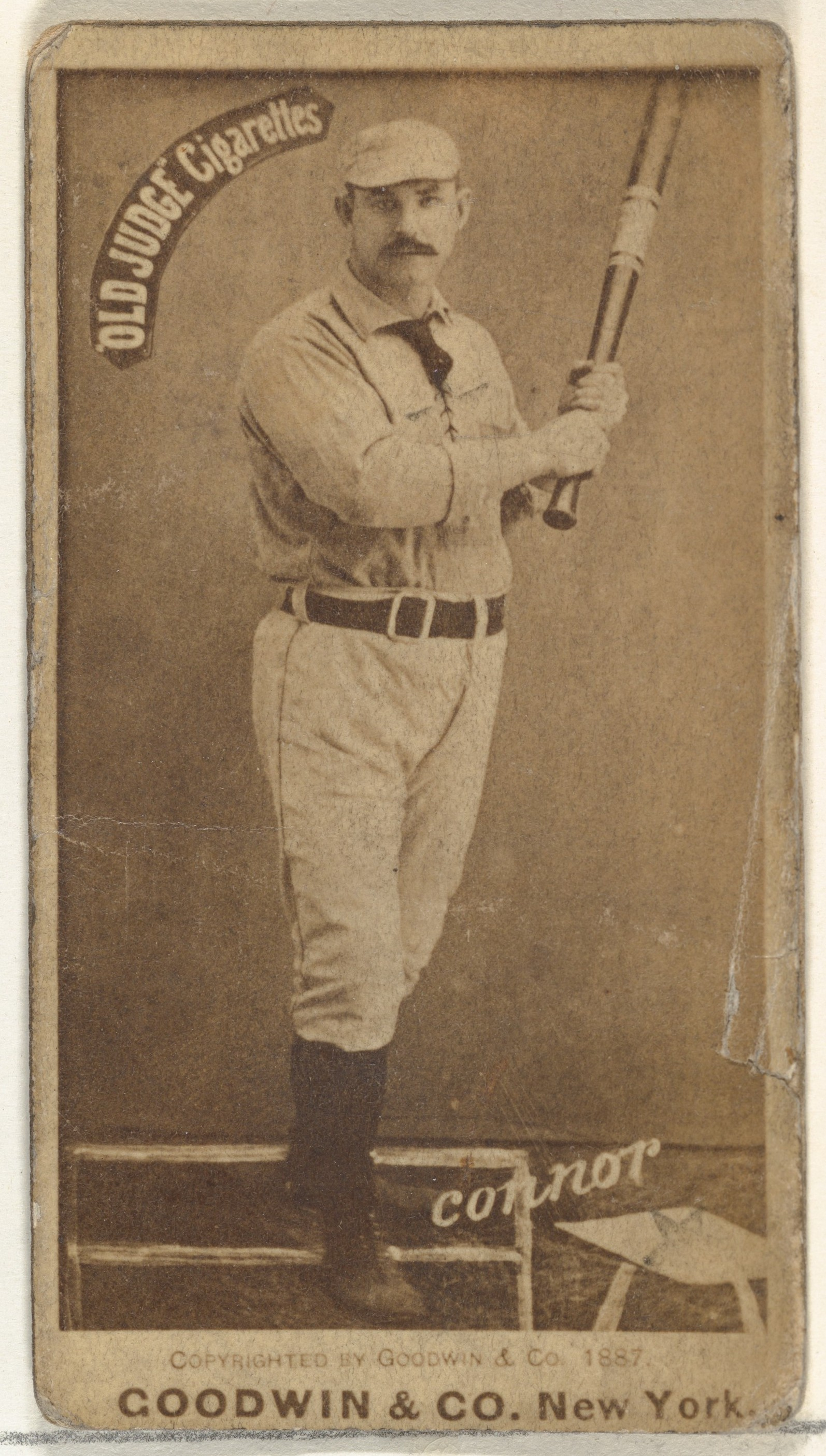
(1887) Baseball Hall of Fame member Roger Connor, New York Giants. Old Judge Cigarettes baseball card. Conner played for New Haven in 1878 and returned to play for the 1901 team.

In 1885, minor league baseball play resumed in New Haven with a brief foray into professional play, when The New Haven team briefly became members of the independent level Southern New England League. The 1885 New Haven season was extremely brief, as the team had just one official game, joining the league and folding after one game on August 15, 1885. New Haven ended their one-game season with a record of 0–1 and were managed by H.A. Ely . After New Haven folded, the Southern New England League re-formed as the Connecticut State League on August 27, 1885.

New Haven returned to hosting minor league play in 1887, with the team becoming known as the New Haven "Blues" for the first time. The New Haven team became members of the six–team Independent level Eastern League. The Bridgeport Giants, Danbury Hatters, Hartford, Springfield and Waterbury teams joined with New Haven in beginning league play on Saturday, April 30, 1887.

The Blues finished the season in fourth place in their first extended season of minor league baseball. New Haven ended the Eastern League season with record of 26–30, playing the season under managers James Donnelly, Dasher Troy and J. P. Kelley. No league playoffs were held, but the league had a tumultuous season as Bridgeport (July 6), and Hartford (July 30) folded during the season. Springfield was "expelled from the league in May 26, 1887. On July 20, 1887 the New Haven team folded from the league, which saw the remaining Danbury and Waterbury teams play through September 13.

The New Haven franchise did not play in 1888, as the six–team Connecticut State League reformed without a New Haven franchise and folded for the season on July 25, 1888.

After being a player/manager for New Haven in 1887, "Dasher" Troy played his last professional season for the Troy Trojans in 1888 when New Haven did not return to play. Playing with the Troy team, his 1888 manager was Ted Sullivan, who years later managed New Haven. Sullivan disapproved of Dasher Troy's consumption of alcoholic beverages and Troy reluctantly agreed to refrain from drinking in order to play for the team under Sullivan. In the last inning of a home game during the 1888 season, Troy promised to his manager that if Sullivan went to the bar under the grandstand and brought him a beer, Troy would "clear the bases." Sullivan obliged the request and Troy reportedly walked up to bat and said, "The 'Old Dash' is back." Troy then hit the ball off the center field fence and raced around the bases for an inside-the-park home run that won the game. Sullivan later stated, "After that I never stopped my old friend, John Troy, from taking his glass of beer." Beginning in 1889, after his playing career ended, Troy operated the beer concession area at the Polo Grounds in New York City. It was reported in 1893, that his patrons sometimes "paid more attention to 'Dasher' Troy's emporium than they did to the game."

=== 1889 to 1896 – Six League memberships ===
The New Haven "Nutmegs" team returned to minor league play in 1889, beginning play as members of the Atlantic Association. New Haven began the season, playing as members of the eight–team league. In the 1889 Atlantic Association, New Haven ended the season in fourth place with a 40–52 record, playing the season under managers Harry Spence and Jack Burdock. The Nutmegs ended the season 17.0 games behind the first place Worcester team as no playoffs were held.

1889 manager Jack Burdock was a veteran player in the major leagues in 1888, where he had become injured and had earlier developed a drinking problem. In, 1881 a horse car accident had left Burdock was rendered unconscious and local newspapers reported that he was in critical condition. Burdock was able to recover quickly from his head injury without missing significant playing time. Because of his drinking, the Boston Beaneaters released Burdock in the middle of the 1888 season. After Burdock's release, from Boston, the Brooklyn Bridegrooms and team president Charlie Byrne gave Burdock a chance with the team. Shortly after Burdock was obtained by Brooklyn, he faced criminal charges for kissing a woman while he was intoxicated. He was acquitted of the charges at trial. Burdock retired as a player at age 39 after returning to Brooklyn for a final season in 1891.

Continuing play in the Atlantic Association, New Haven was the 1890 league champions. With a final record of 82–36, the team finished the season in first place, led to the championship by manager Walt Burnham. The Atlantic league began the season as an eight team and ended the season as a four-team league. The Washington Senators team folded from the league on August 1, 1890. On August 27, 1890, the Wilmington Peach Growers and Hartford Nutmeggers both folded while the first place Baltimore Orioles team left the Atlantic Association with a 77–24 in order to join the American Association. With Baltimore, Washington, Wilmington and Hartford no longer in the Atlantic League, New Haven ended the season in first place, finishing 18.5 games ahead of the second place Lebanon team. No playoffs were held. Dan Lally of New Haven led the Atlantic Association with 12 home runs and 159 total hits, while New Haven pitcher Jonh Doran led the league with a both 1.12 ERA and 241 strikeouts.

New Haven pitchers threw two no-hitters in the 1890 season. On May 21, 1890, John Doran defeated Washington by the score of 4–0 with 11 strikeouts and 4 walks. On September 22, 1890, John Gilliand threw New Haven's second no-hitter of the season in defeating Newark 7–0 with 3 walks and 7 strikeouts.

The New Haven team continued play in 1891 as charter members of the Eastern Association, which formed as an eight–team league with the New Haven Nutmegs as a member. The Eastern Association played as a Class A level league and the president was Charles D. White. The Albany Senators, Buffalo Bisons, Lebanon Cedars, Providence Clamdiggers, Rochester Hop Bitters, Syracuse Stars and Troy Trojans teams joined with New Haven in beginning league play.

The Eastern Association lost four teams during the 1891 season, including New Haven, finishing the season with four remaining teams. New Haven had a 48–39 record under returning manager Walt Burnham when the New Haven team disbanded on August 14. Buffalo was the league champion when the league ended play. New Haven's Dan Lally led the Eastern Association with five home runs and New Haven pitcher L.A. Gilliland led the league with a 0.87 ERA. The Eastern Association did not return to play in 1892.

In the 1892 season, the Eastern Association became the Eastern League and the New Haven Nutmegs folded before completing their season. New Haven had a record of 20–17 under manager Dan Shannon when the team disbanded June 18. They folded just shy of the first half's completion. Overall, in winning percentage, they were in third place at .541 (20–17) behind manager/second baseman Dan Shannon (.244) when they folded. Sandy Griffin hit .302 for New Haven. Pitcher Henry Fournier went 13–6 with a 1.88 ERA for the New Haven team and then compiled a 17–16 record in completing the season pitching for the Buffalo Bisons and Syracuse Stars/Utica Stars teams, giving him a league leading 30 total wins on the season. New Haven did not host a team in the 1893 season.

The 1894 New Haven "Elm Citys" team played as members of the independent Connecticut State League. John McKee served as the New Haven manager. The team record and league results are unknown.

The New Haven Texas "Steers" returned to play in 1896 Class A level Atlantic League. New Haven ended league play with a record of 21–38 under manager Ted Sullivan when the team disbanded July 12. New Haven 1896 played in two leagues during the season. The New Haven "Edgewoods", frequently known as the "Athletics" began the season as members of the Naugatuck Valley League. The New Haven team disbanded July 12, 1896. The 1896 Edgewoods team had a record of 22–18 under manager T.R. Greist, finishing in a third place tie in the six-team league as no playoffs were held. New Haven had an identical record as the Derby Angels. New Haven ended their Naugatuck Valley League season 3.0 games behind the first place Bridgeport Victors, who were managed by Baseball Hall of Fame member Jim O'Rourke and 2.0 games behind the Torrington Tornados, managed by former New Haven player and all of fame member Roger Connor.

Pitcher Ned Garvin played his second professional season with New Haven in 1886, before making his major league debut with the Philadelphia Phillies later in the 1896 season. As his career continued, Garvin developed a pitch that curved in the opposite direction of the typical curveball thrown by a right-handed pitcher. Garvin's long fingers allowed him to hold the ball with a unique grip. Some sources credit Garvin with teaching hall of fame pitcher Christy Mathewson about his signature pitch. A similar pitch is known as a screwball in modern baseball.

Early in his career, Garvin was known to drink heavily and become violent in his interactions. Garvin became known as "The Navasota Tarantula" in reference to his hometown of Navasota, Texas. In 1900, Garvin shot at a black man who he said had refused to shine his shoes and faced a trial for his actions. The next year Garvin stabbed another man during a barroom fight. In the winter 1908, Garvin had finished pitching in the 1907 season and was suffering from tuberculosis. He returned to his native Texas in the hopes that a climate change would help him. Still suffering from the disease Garvin moved again, this time to Fresno, California. Garvin died in Fresno on June 16, 1908.

The New Haven team did not return to play in 1897, as the Connecticut State League, reformed as a six–team league without a New Haven franchise in the Class F level league.

=== 1898 to 1905 – New Haven Blues ===
The New Haven "Blues" resumed play as members of the 1898 Class F level Connecticut State League, beginning a fifteen-season tenure of consecutive membership in the league. The league expanded to become an eight–team league. The 1898 team was also known as the "Students." The league was sometimes known as the interchangeable "Connecticut League" in the era. New Haven joined the Bridgeport Orators, Danbury Hatters, Derby Angels, Meriden Bulldogs, New Britain Rangers, New London Whalers and Waterbury Pirates teams in beginning league play on May 4, 1898.

In returning to play in the 1898 Connecticut State League, New Haven placed a close second in the standings. The Blues ended the season with a record of 56–40, playing the season under five managers: Chippy McGarr, Thomas Reilly, M.B. Yaw, Mike Hickey and Connie Miller. New Haven Ended the season just 0.5 game behind the first place Waterbury Pirates (55–38) in the final standings. No playoffs were held. Freddy Parent of New Haven won the Connecticut State League batting title, with an average of .326 and also led the league with both 96 runs scored and 125 total hits.

In their second season of Connecticut State League play, the New Haven Blues won the 1899 league championship. Continuing play in the Class F level Connecticut State League, the team compiled a record of 55–38, placing first in the final standings of the eight–team league. Managed in 1899 by Thomas Reilly, New Haven finished 3½ games ahead of the second place Waterbury Rough Riders in the final standings. Waterbury was managed by former New Haven player and Hall of Fame member Roger Connor. No playoffs were held. Feddy Parent returned to New Haven and led the league with 138 total hits. Blues' pitcher Charles McDonald won 26 games to lead the league.

In defending their championship from the season before, the New Haven Blues placed second in the 1900 Class F level Connecticut State League. Playing under managers Thomas Reilly and Jim Canavan, New Haven ended the season with a record of 58–39. The team finished 6.0 games behind the first place Norwich Witches in the final standings, as no playoffs were held.

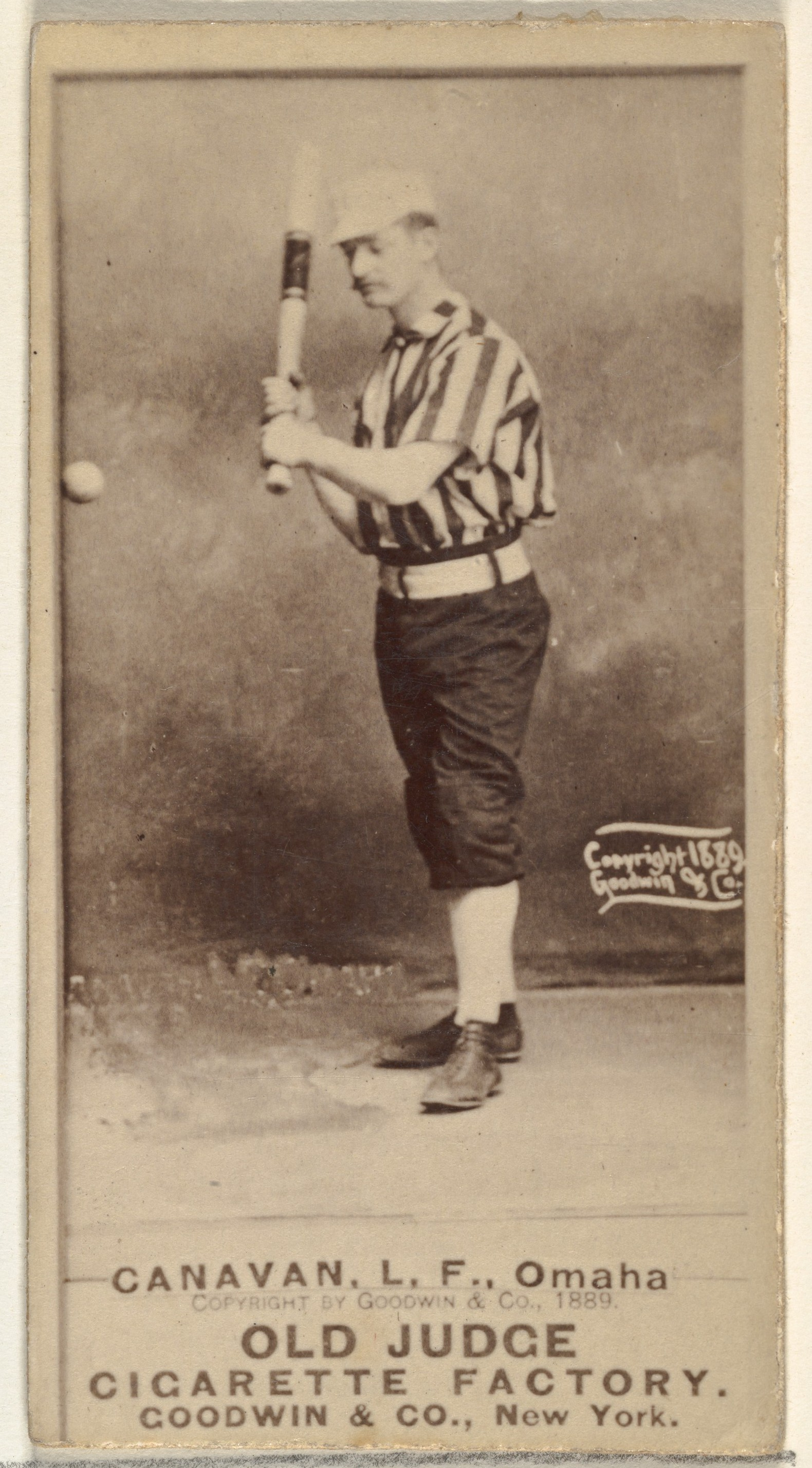
(1889) Jim Canavan, Omaha Omahogs. Canavan managed New Haven from 1900 to 1905, winning the league championship in 1903.

Jim Canavan began a five-season tenure as the New Haven manager in 1900. Canavan had been a major league player who had his most productive in 1894 with the Cincinnati Reds, when he hit 13 home runs to finish second to Baseball Hall of Fame member Hugh Duffy of the Boston Nationals. In 1899, had ended his baseball career and moved to Arizona, where he joined his uncle in the copper mining business. After ten months, Canavan returned to his hometown of New Bedford, Massachusetts where he purchased and began a tenure as manager of the New Haven franchise in the Connecticut Baseball League.

The 1901 New Haven Blues placed fifth in the eight–team Class F level Connecticut State League final standings. New Haven compiled a final record of 56–54, playing the season under the direction of returning manager Jim Canavan. The Blues finished the season 10.0 games behind the first place Bristol Woodchoppers in the final league standings. At age 43, Baseball Hall of Fame member Roger Connor returned to play for the 1901 New Haven Blues. Connor began the 1901 season as the owner-manager player of the Waterbury Rough Riders in the Connecticut State League. In July, 1901, dissatisfied with both his team's play and the level of fan support, Connor sold the Waterbury franchise to local businessman George Harrington and then signed to play with New Haven. For the season, Connor hit. 299 in 411 at bats between the two teams.

New Haven Blues continued play in 1902, as the eight–team Connecticut State League became classified as a Class D level league. The Blues won the league championship in the newly elevated league. Ending the season with a final record of 70–39, the Blues placed first in the league standings, as New Haven was again managed by Jim Canavan. The Blues ended the season 5½ games ahead of the second place Springfield Ponies, who were managed by Roger Connor. No playoff was held.

The 1903 New Haven Blues were the runner–up, as the league changed formal names for one season. New Haven ended the season with a record of 52–57 to place sixth in eight-team Class D level "Connecticut League." Managed by Jim Canavan, the Blues ended the season 17.0 games behind the first place Holyoke Paperweights in the final standings.

William "Yale" Murphy played for the Blues in 1903. Murphy had attended Yale University, leading to his nickname. Murphy had played for the New York Giants in 1894, 1895, and 1897. Listed as 5 ft 3 in (1.60 m) tall and 125 lbs. Murphy and Dickey Pearce are the two shortest players ever to have a career in Major League Baseball. Murphy was the subject of the 1894 book titled Yale Murphy, the Great Short-Stop, or, The Little Midget of the Giants. After his playing career ended following the 1903 season, Murphy became a physician. Murphy died of pulmonary tuberculosis on February 14, 1906, at age 36.

New Haven Blues finished in third place in the 1904 season. With a record of 69–47, New Haven continued play in their final full season under team owner and manager Jim Canavan. The Class D level league returned to "Connecticut State League" name, as New Haven finished 39.0 games behind the first place Bridgeport Orators. After the completion of the season, twelve Holyoke games were deducted due to ineligible player violations.

On August 3, 1904, New Haven pitcher Phil Corcoran threw a no-hitter in a 4–0 victory over the New London Whalers. Corcoran issued one walk and had two strikeouts in the game.

The 1905 New Haven Blues placed seventh, as the Connecticut State League became a reclassified as Class B level League. The New Haven ended the season with a final record of 47–70, led by returning manager Jim Canavan in his final season and his replacement, Jack Tighe. New Haven finished 34.0 games behind the first place Holyoke Paperweights in the final standings.

On August 18, 1905, New Haven pitcher Tom Tuckey threw a no-hitter in a 7–0 victory over the Norwich Reds team. In the game, Tuckey issued one walk and had six strikeouts in his no-hitter.

Following his tenure with New Haven, owner and manager Jim Canavan later became a scout for the Detroit Tigers, signing Jeff Tesreau among others. Canavan later recommended Tesreau to New York Giants manager John McGraw, who signed him, leading to a successful career with the New York Giants.

=== 1906 to 1908 – Connecticut State League ===
Playing under a new manager, the 1906 New Haven Blues placed third in the eight-team Connecticut State League final standings, rebounding from their seventh-place finish the season before. The Blues ended the season with a record of 68–57, playing the season under manager Bill Slack. No playoffs were held. New Haven's Ed Fitzpatrick led the Connecticut State League with 88 runs scored, while Blues pitcher Mickey Corcoran won 26 games, tops in the league.

In 1907, the New Haven Blues were managed by the team owner, Cornelius Danaher. Years earlier while owner of a nearby minor league team, Danaher had signed Baseball Hall of Fame member Connie Mack to play for his Meriden team, beginning Mack's professional career at age 21. Danaher was a local lawyer. Danaher signed Cornelius McGillicuddy, Mack's given name, as a catcher for a salary of $90 per month.

The Blues ended the 1907 eight-team Connecticut State League final season with a record of 44–80. New Haven finished in seventh place, playing the season under the direction of owner/manager Cornelius Danaher. No playoff was held, as New Haven ended the season 38½ games behind the first place Holyoke Papermakers team. Despite pitching on the seventh-place team, New Haven pitcher Ira Plank led the league with 26 victories.

In their final season known as the New Haven "Blues." the team continued minor league play in the 1908 eight–team Class B level Connecticut State League, ending the season in an improved third place. The Blues achieved their place finish with a final record of 83–63. Playing the season under the direction of managers Bert Daly, Billy Lush and George Bone. No playoffs were held, as the Blues ended their last Connecticut State League season 30½ games behind the first place Springfield Ponies in the standings. Hack Simmons of New Haven led the league with 10 home runs. Simmons also had 155 hits and scored 78 runs to lead the league in both categories.

New Haven Blues manager Billy Lush had been the Yale College collegiate baseball coach beginning in 1905, with famed football pioneer Walter Camp as an advisor, leading the team to the Ivy League championship in his first season. Yale is located in New Haven, Connecticut. Lush was also managing the Plattsburgh minor league franchise in 1905 and 1906, where one of his players in 1906 was Baseball Hall of Fame member Eddie Collins. In February 1906, Yale extended Lush, giving him a three-year contract. Lush remained in charge of the Yale baseball team in 1906 and 1907, but was replaced by Tad Jones in 1908, when the college briefly decided to cease using professional coaches. Lush was paid his contracted amount by Yale in 1908. After leaving New Haven, Lush became the basketball coach at the United States Naval Academy in the 1908–09 basketball season. In February 1909, he was rehired as Yale's baseball coach after a one-season hiatus. He remained as the baseball coach at Yale through the 1911 season.

=== 1909 & 1910 – New nicknames ===
In 1909 the team was renamed as the New Haven "Black Crows" and the team was owned by George Cameron.

During the season, New Haven player Jacob "Bugs" Reisigl was indefinitely suspended by New Haven on June 14, 1909. Newspaper reports stated, "(Reisigl) has been acting badly for a week, and he has been talking as bad as he has acted. He is useless to the team in his present condition, and he will be allowed to sober off."

After his return from suspension, Reisigl was in conflict with his teammates, who physically beat him up following a game on August 5, 1909. As the story went, Reisigl "grinned with delight" when the pitchers on the team were not pitching well during their game that day. After the game Reisigl received a "wholesome punching" from his teammates. Later in the season before a contest against Holyoke, New Haven captain Elmer Zacher caught Reisigl fraternizing in Holyoke's dressing room just before a game in which Reisigl was the starting pitcher. After the game, his teammates "went in search of him. They saw him and he ran and they could not catch him." After these incidents, newspaper reports started to refer to him as "Bugs" Reisigl. Reisigl's brother Charles also was a pitcher on the 1909 New Haven team, until he was released in August.

New Haven ended the 1909 Connecticut State League season in sixth place. With a record of 59–65, New Haven played the season under manager Phil Corcoran. No playoffs were held as New Haven finished 18.0 games behind the first place Hartford Senators in the final standings of the eight-team, Class B level league.

Before the 1910 New Haven season, Bugs Reisigl was traded by New Haven to the Davenport Prodigals of the Three-I League in exchange for George Reitz. However, Reitz later retired as a player, so the trade with Davenport was voided and Reisigl remained with New Haven. In June 1910, Reisigl was suspended for insubordination after he failed to show up for a team road trip to Hartford and did not offer an acceptable explanation in the aftermath. It was stated that manager Bill Carrick "has experienced considerable trouble recently with Reisigl. He gave him several chances to brace up, but ‘Bugs’ seemed to pay no attention to the several warnings."

Bill Carrick had been a pitcher for the New Haven teams in 1908 and 1909, before being named as player/manager for the 1910 season.

In 1910, the team became known as New Haven "Hens." New Haven continued play as members of the eight–team Class B level Connecticut State League. The Hens finished with an overall record of 67–55 and in fourth place, playing the season under manager Bill Carrick. No playoffs held and in a close race, New Haven ended the season 3.0 games behind the first place Waterbury Finnegans in the final standings.

Before the 1911 season the Rochester Bronchos returned Reisigl to the newly named New Haven "Murlins" for the 1911 season, with New Haven now managed by Pop Foster. Pitching for New Haven, Reisigl led the 1911 Connecticut State League pitchers with 199 strikeouts. The 1911 and 1912 New Haven Murlins played the final seasons for New Haven as members of the Connecticut State League.

== The ballpark ==
For their duration of play in the era, New Haven minor league teams hosted home games at the Howard Avenue Grounds.

== Timeline ==
Year(s)	# Yrs.	Team	Level	League	Ballpark
1878	1	New Haven	Independent	International Association	Howard Avenue Grounds
1885	1	New Haven	Independent	Southern New England League	Howard Avenue Grounds
1887	1	New Haven Blues	Independent	Eastern League	Howard Avenue Grounds
1889–1890	2	New Haven	Independent	Atlantic Association	Howard Avenue Grounds
1891	1	New Haven Nutmegs	Class A	Eastern Association	Howard Avenue Grounds
1892	2	New Haven Nutmegs	Independent	Eastern League	Howard Avenue Grounds
1894	3	New Haven Elm Citys	Class B	Connecticut State League	Howard Avenue Grounds
1896 (1)	1	New Haven Edgewoods	Independent	Naugatuck Valley League	Howard Avenue Grounds
1896 (2)	1	New Haven Texas Steers	Class A	Atlantic League	Howard Avenue Grounds
1898–1901	4	New Haven Blues	Class F	Connecticut State League	Howard Avenue Grounds
1902–1904	3	New Haven Blues	Class D	Connecticut State League	Howard Avenue Grounds
1905–1908	3	New Haven Blues	Class B	Connecticut State League	Howard Avenue Grounds
1909	1	New Haven Black Crows	Class B	Connecticut State League	Howard Avenue Grounds
1910	1	New Haven Prairie Hens	Class B	Connecticut State League	Howard Avenue Grounds
1911–1912	2	New Haven Merlins	Class B	Connecticut State League	Howard Avenue Grounds

== Year–by–year records ==
Year	Record	Finish	Manager	Playoffs
1878	1–11	NA	Charlie Waitt	New Haven moved to Hartford May 20; Team expelled June 20
1885	0–1	NA	H.A. Ely	Team joined and folded August 15
1887	26–30	4th	James Donnelly / Dasher Troy; J. P. Kelley	No playoffs held
1889	40–52	4th	Harry Spence / Jack Burdock	No playoffs held
1890	82–36	1st	Walt Burnham	League champions No playoffs held
1891	48–39	NA	Walt Burnham	Team disbanded August 14
1892	20–17	NA	Dan Shannon	Team disbanded June 18
1896 (1)	21–38	NA	Ted Sullivan	Team disbanded July 12
1896 (2)	22–18	3rd (t)	T.R. Greist	No playoffs held
1898	56–40	2nd	Chippy McGarr / Thomas Reilly / M.B. Yaw / Mike Hickey / Connie Miller	No playoffs held
1899	55–38	1st	Thomas Reilly	League champions No playoffs held
1900	58–39	2nd	Thomas Reilly / Jim Canavan	No playoffs held
1901	56–54	5th	Jim Canavan	No playoffs held
1902	70–39	1st	Jim Canavan	League champions No playoffs held
1903	52–57	6th	Jim Canavan	No playoffs held
1904	69–47	3rd	Jim Canavan	No playoffs held
1905	47–70	7th	Jim Canavan / Jack Tighe	No playoffs held
1906	68–57	3rd	Bill Slack	No playoffs held
1907	44–80	7th	Cornelius Danaher	No playoffs held
1908	63–63	3rd	Bert Daly / Billy Lush / George Bone	No playoffs held
1909	59–65	6th	Phil Corcoran	No playoffs held
1910	67–55	4th	Bill Carrick	No playoffs held

== Notable alumni ==
- Roger Connor (1878, 1901), Inducted Baseball Hall of Fame 1976
- Candy Cummings (1878), Inducted Baseball Hall of Fame 1939
- Bill Annis (1891)
- Billy Barnie (1878)
- Larry Battam (1900)
- Joe Battin (1889–1890)
- Ed Beecher (1891–1892)
- Frank Betcher (1907)
- Ed Biecher (1896)
- Jud Birchall (1878)
- George Bone (1896, 1900–1901, 1903; 1908, MGR)
- George Bradley (1878)
- Frank Brill (1887)
- John Brown (1899)
- Jack Burdock (1886, MGR)
- Frank Burke (1905–1906)
- Dick Burns (1887)
- Tom Cahill (1889–1890)
- Jim Canavan (1900–1905, MGR)
- Bill Carrick (1908–1909; 1910, MGR)
- Scrappy Carroll (1891)
- Kid Carsey (1889)
- Ed Cassian (1891–1892)
- Dad Clarkson (1891)
- Jim Clinton (1878)
- Harry Colliflower (1896, 1900)
- Fred Cone (1878)
- Jack Corcoran (1889)
- Tommy Corcoran (1889)
- Monte Cross (1892)
- Bill Crowley (1887)
- Jim Cudworth (1890–1891)
- John Cuff (1887)
- Bert Daly (1908, MGR)
- Ira Davis (1899)
- Harry Decker (1891)
- John Deering (1901–1902, 1905)
- Eddie Dent (1910)
- Buttercup Dickerson (1890)
- Cozy Dolan (1899)
- Jim Donnelly (1892, 1900)
- Alexander Donoghue (1896)
- John Doran (1889, 1891)
- Tom Doran (1900)
- Conny Doyle (1891)
- Pat Duff (1900)
- Jim Duggan (1908)
- Jake Evans (1878)
- Charlie Fallon (1910)
- Sid Farrar (1891)
- Leo Fishel (1899)
- Dennis Fitzgerald (1889)
- John Fitzgerald (1887)
- Ed Flanagan (1892, 1899)
- Henry Fournier (1892)
- Ed Foster (1910)
- Bill Friel (1900)
- John Galligan (1889)
- Bob Ganley (1898)
- Bill Gannon (1896)
- Ned Garvin (1896)
- Jim Gilman (1896)
- Ed Glynn (1899)
- George Gore (1878)
- Sandy Griffin (1892)
- Henry Gruber (1892, 1896)
- Bob Hall (1902–1903)
- Jim Halpin (1887)
- Jack Hannifin (1906)
- Tom Healey (1885)
- George Hemming (1899)
- John Henry (1891)
- Mike Hickey (1898; MGR, 1905)
- George Hodson (1900)
- Jim Holdsworth (1878)
- Sam Hope (1902–1903)
- Jack Horner (1889–1891)
- William Hyndman (1885)
- Dick Johnston (1892)
- George Keefe (1896)
- Bill Keister (1896)
- Dan Lally (1889–1891)
- Billy Lauder (1896)
- Jack Leary (1887)
- Ed Lennox (1905)
- Pete LePine (1900)
- Art LaVigne (1909)
- Mike Ledwith (1878)
- Billy Lush (1898–1899; 1908, MGR)
- Henry Lynch (1890)
- Jack Lynch (1878)
- John Lyston (1891)
- Joe Martin (outfielder) (1899–1908)
- Chippy McGarr (1898, MGR)
- Everett Mills (1878)
- Mike Morrison (1891)
- Tom Morrissey (1892)
- Frank Murphy (1901)
- Larry Murphy (1892)
- Willie Murphy (1887)
- Yale Murphy (1903)
- Jim Mutrie (1878)
- Hal O'Hagan (1896)
- Tom O'Rourke (1889)
- Red Ownes (1899)
- Pat Paige (1908)
- John Pappalau (1899)
- Freddy Parent (1898–1899)
- Roger Peckinpaugh (1910) 1925 AL MVP
- Bob Pettit (1890)
- Pat Pettee (1890–1891)
- Herman Pitz (1889)
- Dan Phelan (1887)
- Tad Quinn (1904–1905)
- Charlie Reilley (1878)
- Bugs Reisigl (1909–1910)
- Dick Rudolph (1906)
- Ed Sales (1891)
- Jumbo Schoeneck (1889–1890)
- Dan Shannon (1892, MGR)
- Timothy Sheehan (1889)
- Hack Simmons (1908)
- Leo Smith (1896)
- Joe Sommer (1891)
- Harry Spence (1889–1890, MGR)
- Charley Stis (1910)
- Harry Stovey (1878)
- Bill Stuart (1899)
- Sleeper Sullivan (1889)
- Ted Sullivan (1896, MGR)
- Dan Sweeney (1896)
- Billy Taylor (1887)
- John Thornton (1896)
- Jack Tighe (1905, MGR)
- Dasher Troy (1887, MGR)
- Tom Tuckey (1902–1907)
- Ham Wade (1906–1907)
- Charlie Waitt (1889–1890)
- George Walker (1889)
- Pete Weckbecker (1887)
- Bert Weeden (1903)
- Oscar Westerberg (1908)
- Jake Wells (1892)
- Tug Wilson (1891)
- Stan Yerkes (1906)
- Elmer Zacher (1908–1909)

== See also ==
New Haven Profs

- New Haven Blues players
- New Haven Prairie Hens players
- New Haven Texas Steers players
- New Haven Black Crows players
- New Haven Edgewoods players
- New Haven (minor league baseball) players
