= Ed Biecher =

American baseball player and manager (1875–1939)

- Outfielder
- Born: August 27, 1875; St. Louis, Missouri, U.S.
- Died: July 15, 1939 (aged 63); St. Louis, Missouri, U.S.
- Batted: Unknown Threw: Unknown

MLB debut
- September 26, 1897, for the St. Louis Browns

Last MLB appearance
- October 10, 1898, for the Cleveland Spiders

MLB statistics
- Batting average: .243
- Home runs: 0
- Runs batted in: 1
- Stats at Baseball Reference

Teams
- St. Louis Browns (1897); Cleveland Spiders (1898)

Edward Biecher (August 27, 1875 – July 15, 1939), sometimes known as Ed Beecher, was an American professional baseball player and manager. He played two season in Major League Baseball (MLB) with the St. Louis Browns (1897) and Cleveland Spiders (1898). Biecher also played in the minor leagues for four seasons (1896, 1898–1900). During the 1903 season, he was hired as the manager of the Terre Haute Hottentots.

== Professional career ==
Biecher made his professional baseball debut in 1896 with the minor league New Haven Edgewoods, who represented New Haven, Connecticut. On September 26, 1897, Biecher made his debut in Major League Baseball as a member of the St. Louis Browns. During that game, which was against Ed Beecher, he got no hits in four at-bats. In only three games in the majors that year, he batted .333 with one run scored, four hits, one run batted in, and one stolen base in 12 at-bats. In 1898, Biecher played in the major leagues and the minor leagues. With the Cleveland Spiders MLB franchise, he batted .200 with one run scored, five hits, and two doubles in eight games played. In the minors, he played with the Mansfield Haymakers of the Interstate League.

During the 1899 season, Biecher continued playing with the Mansfield Haymakers, who represented Mansfield, Ohio. In 1900, with the Haymakers, he batted .199 with 27 runs scored, 53 hits, 16 doubles, four triples, one home run, and eight stolen bases in 74 games played. Biecher also pitched one game. In the field, he played 60 games in the outfield, seven games at shortstop, and four games at third base. Biecher managed the Terre Haute Hottentots during the 1903 season. He was one of five managers for the Hottentots in 1903, the others being John Heenan, William James, Pete Sommers, and Lew Walters.

== Personal life ==
Biecher was born on August 27, 1875, in St. Louis, Missouri. He died on July 15, 1939, in St. Louis, and was buried at St. Paul Churchyard in Affton, Missouri.
