= Savin Rock Amusement Park =

Defunct amusement park in Connecticut, United States

Coordinates: 41.257°N 72.950°W

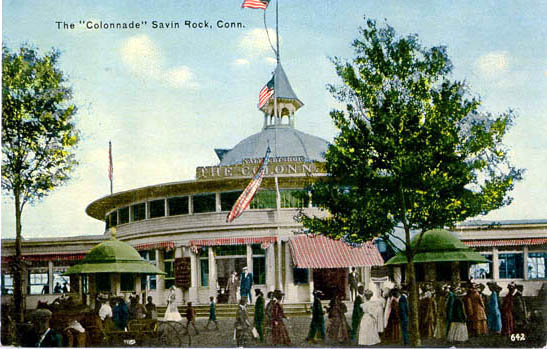
Postcard picture of The Colonnade, Savin Rock

Savin Rock was an American amusement park in West Haven, Connecticut. It was previously called The White City and was established in the 1870s . The park included a number of roller coasters, other rides and numerous funhouses.

The park has been mentioned in several novels such as Eleanor Estes's Rufus M., Stephen King's Low Men in Yellow Coats and The Boogeyman.

== History ==
=== Early History ===
The amusement park was established in the 1870s after entrepreneur George Kelsey extended the trolley lines and built a 1,500-foot pier at the end of Beach Street to accommodate a ferry service. Kelsey built the nearby Seaview Hotel, with rooms for up to 150 guests. A beachside resort grew around the hotel and pier, including a bandstand, a fountain, an observatory, a wooded area for picnics, and a carousel which was revolved first by manpower and later by a horse on a treadmill. Amusements were built by other businessmen, and soon the park had a zoo, a museum and a dance hall. Promoters organized cock fights, horse races and prize fights.

The park's first "flying horses" attraction began operation in 1878, built by Charles Hagar. This ride was located in the Grove. A 40-foot tower that served as an observatory stood over the park; however, it burned down in 1897.

In 1903 carnival rides were added and the area was officially opened as an amusement park called the White City with an entrance at the corner of Savin Avenue and Thomas Street. Around it, taking in Rock, Campbell and Beach streets, were theaters, restaurants and hotels. At its peak, “The Rock” took in a mile-long midway, with roller coasters, water chutes and carousel rides, There were bumper cars, fun houses, concerts and marathon dances. Visitors could enjoy shore dinners with frozen custard or split hot dogs, drink "honeydew," munch on popcorn, and consult mechanical fortune tellers or The Laughing Lady. Visitors could take in an auto race at the adjacent West Haven Speedway. The Rock had a variety of rides for its tourists. Its oldest ride was The Old Mill, built in 1904. Another ride was Shoot-the-Chutes, which was rebuilt and renamed The Mill Chutes, featuring a moving stairway saving ride-goers a hike to the ride entrance. Among the other rides were the Jitterbug, The Virginia Reel, and The Seaplane Swing. It also had several rollercoasters such as The Sky Blazer, The Racer, The Whirlwind Racer, The White City Flyer, and The Thunderbolt.

=== Peak Popularity and Expansion ===
By 1919, the park, now called Savin Rock Amusement Park, was attracting 1.2 million visitors each year. Liberty Pier was added to the park in 1922 and it brought a new roller coaster, The Devil, and a funhouse, Bluebeard’s Castle. The pier was destroyed in a fire in 1932.

The Rock also had an array of funhouses. Noah’s Ark funhouse was decorated with Noah and his family on the deck, while the inside was filled with shaker boards and startling animal stunts. A Death Valley patented PTC funhouse was built on Beach Street, however its skull and cross bone façade was replaced with a Laffing Sal. Inside it is a swinging bridge a, a stretch of floor covered by a pillow, and a tilt room. Another funhouse was Bluebeard’s Castle which used Bluebeard’s mouth as an entrance and exit; it included “two tilt room, a floor with rollers, and lots of air holes. The stunts were plywood cutouts of Bluebeard and his gang…”

Inside the White City was a movie theater, The Orpheum Theater, which was open all year round was owned by Doc Dewaltop from 1913 until it was destroyed by a fire in 1921. Jimmie’s Restaurant started out as Jimmie’s Hotdog Stand. It was famous for its split-top hotdogs.

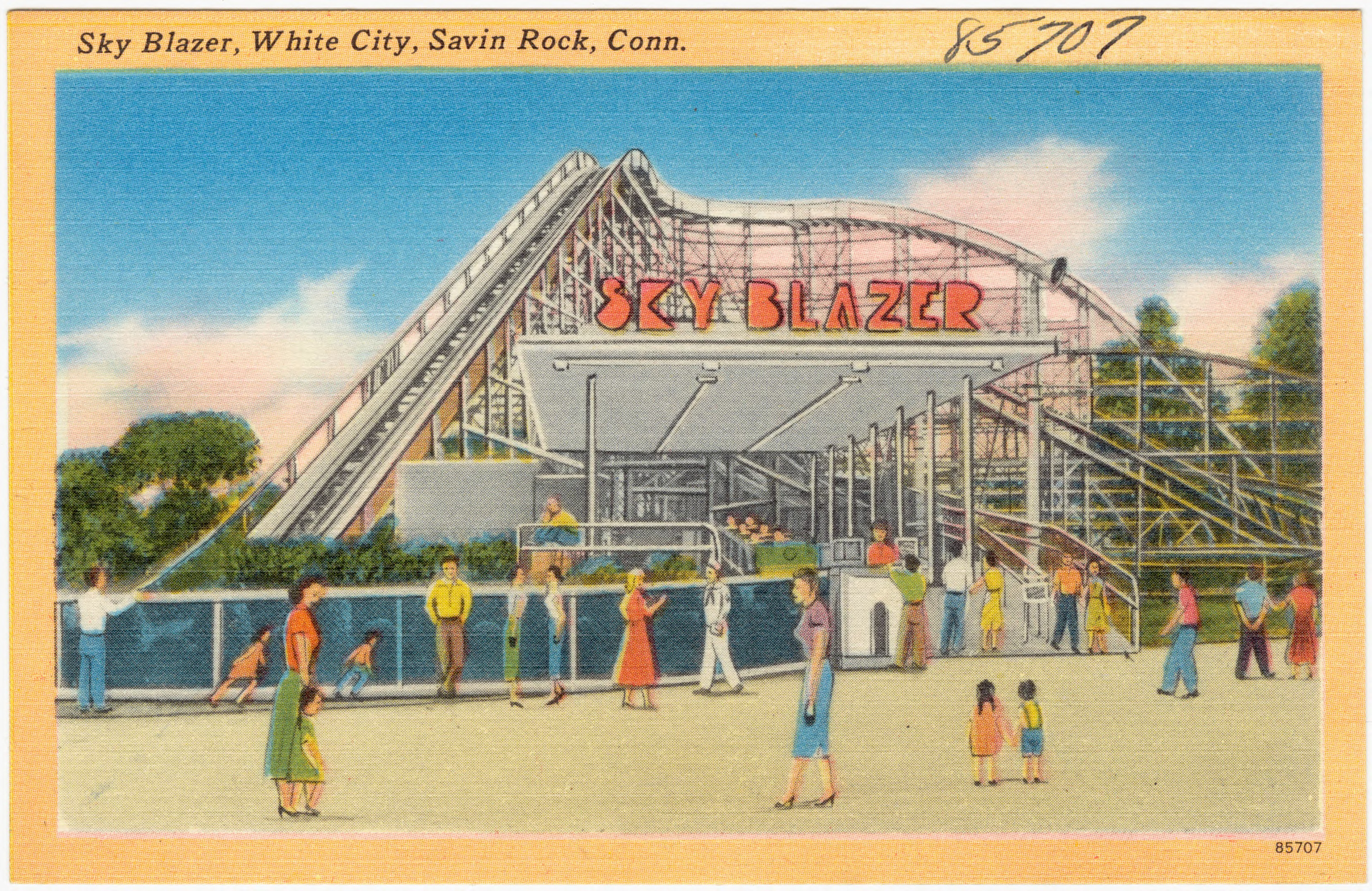
Postcard c. 1950s

The Great Hurricane of 1938 flattened Beach Street and destroyed The Devil and The Thunderbolt rollercoaster. The park endured and another Thunderbolt was created.

=== Donovan Field ===
In the late 1890s, a baseball facility called the Savin Rock Baseball Grounds (or Park) was established at 50 Oak Street in West Haven, within the amusement park grounds. It was used by the New Haven minor league teams at various times during the seasons of 1899 through 1932. George Weiss acquired the ball club in 1919. In 1931, the venue was renamed Donovan Field, in honor of Wild Bill Donovan, a popular local pitcher and manager who had died in a train accident in 1923.

Local newspapers sometimes called it "The Rock". In addition to minor league ball and other baseball events, the venue was also used for football, boxing, wrestling, and eventually auto racing. It existed into the 1960s and was eventually abandoned along with the rest of the amusement park. Its location at the south corner of Oak Street and Captain Thomas Boulevard is now a grass-covered vacant lot.

=== Decline and Closure ===
Although there were plans to enlarge the amusement park during the 1950s, by the 1960s industrial and residential development had grown up around the park, and it gradually lost popularity and became run down. The park was finally closed in 1966.

=== Legacy ===
The final carousel, PTC #21, was moved to Six Flags Magic Mountain where it underwent a $10,000 restoration and reopened in 1971. It is still operable today.

Many artifacts from the amusement park are preserved in the Savin Rock Museum and Learning Center in West Haven.

== In popular culture ==
In Eleanor Estes's 1943 children's novel Rufus M., the chapter "The Flying Horse Named Jimmy" takes place at a fictionalized version of the park during the World War I era. Estes grew up in West Haven, which she called Cranbury in her novels. Savin Park also is the setting for chapter 4 of Stephen King's novella "Low Men in Yellow Coats", which appears in the 1999 collection "Hearts in Atlantis," and is mentioned in his short story "The Boogeyman." It is also mentioned in Leigh Bardugo's 2019 novel Ninth House.
