= Lighthouse Point Carousel =

- U.S. National Register of Historic Places
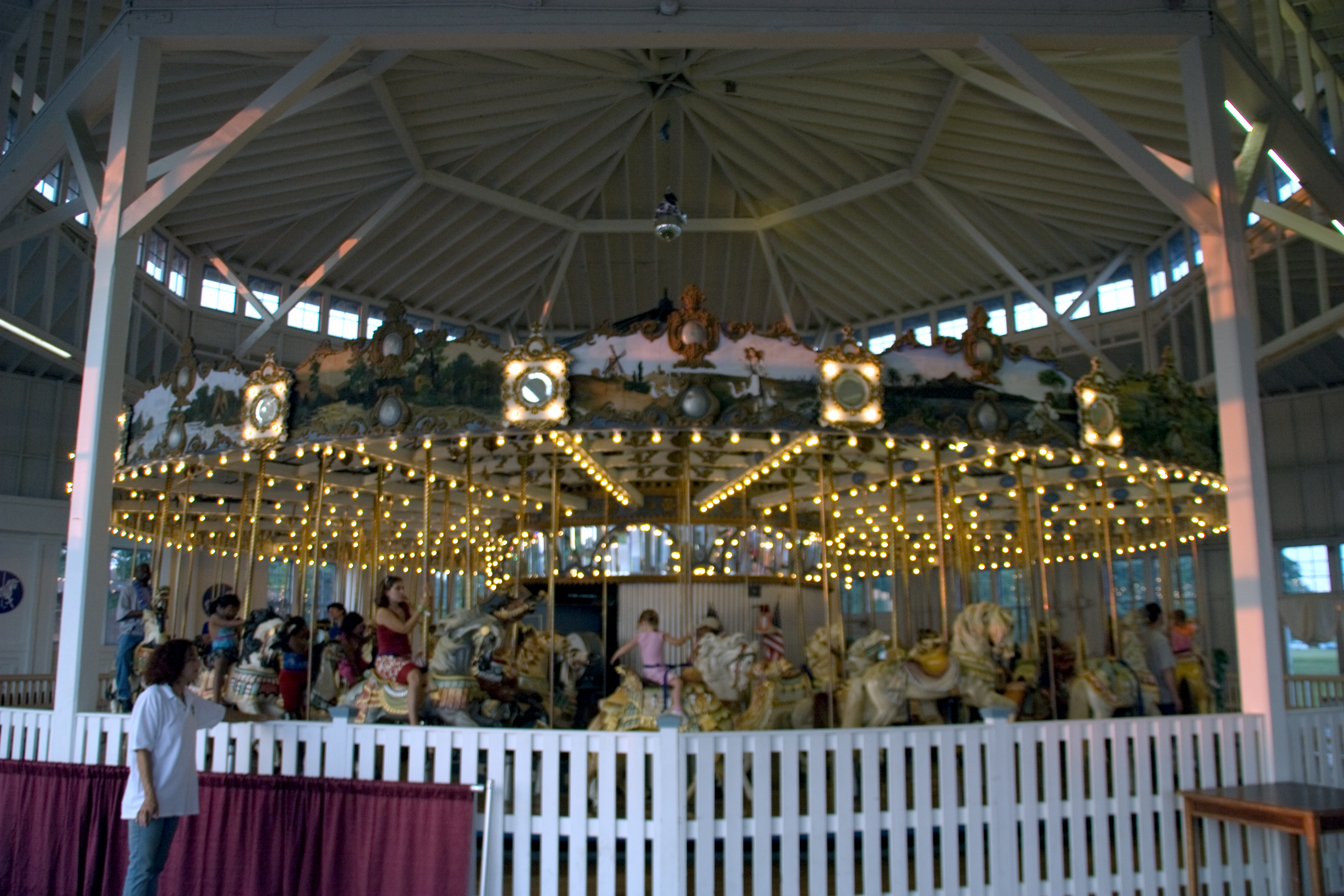
- Lighthouse Point Carousel in 2008

- Location within Connecticut Location within the United States
- Location: Lighthouse Point Park, Lighthouse Avenue, New Haven, Connecticut
- Coordinates: 41°14′54″N 72°54′12″W
- Area: less than one acre
- Built: 1916
- Architectural style: Renaissance
- NRHP reference No.: 83003578
- Added to NRHP: December 15, 1983

The Lighthouse Point Carousel is located in the East Shore section of New Haven, Connecticut in Lighthouse Point Park. The carousel was built about 1905, and is one of a shrinking number of early 20th-century carousels left in the state, featuring the carvings of Charles Looff and Charles Carmel. The carousel and its 1916 building were together listed on the National Register of Historic Places on December 15, 1983.

== Description and history ==
The Lighthouse Point Carousel is located in New Haven's Lighthouse Point Park, near the southeastern top of the city on Long Island Sound. It is located in a rectangular building, about 200 feet (61 m) inland from the Five Mile Point Light which gives the park its name. The building is about 150 by 90 feet (46 m × 27 m) in size, with a high-ceilinged square section housing the carousel, and a lower-roofed extension that houses concessions. The building has Renaissance Revival styling, with tall window bays articulated by pilasters, and round-arch window bays surrounding the carousel section. The roof above the carousel is topped by a monitor with clerestory windows.

The carousel itself is a platform style device, about 60 feet (18 m) in diameter. It includes 70 figures and two chariots, some of the figures mounted on fixed metal columns, and some on columns that rise and fall with the carousel's motion. The figures appear to have originated from different sources, including figures carved in a diversity of styles. Some of them have been attributed to Charles Carmel of Brooklyn and others to Charles Looff. A figure of George Washington can be seen directing the carousel with a baton. The mechanism that drives the carousel is located at the center, with a decorative fiberglass surround.

The carousel was constructed about 1905 by Timothy Murphy. Murphy is known to have "reworked" materials from other carousels, and is believed to have hired Carmel to make some alterations to the figures here. The present building was erected in 1916 by Thomas Shanley, the proprietor who developed Lighthouse Point Park as a trolley park. The park was purchased by the city in 1925, which reduced the number of attractions, but continued to operate the carousel for many years. All of the other park buildings were demolished in 1957, but the carousel was retained, its figures placed in storage. It has since been restored to operation.

Overnight between August 12 and 13, 2026, a severe storm heavily damaged the building housing the carousel.

== See also ==
- Amusement rides on the National Register of Historic Places
- National Register of Historic Places listings in New Haven, Connecticut
