= Jim Canavan =

American baseball player (1866–1949)

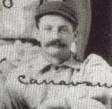
- Outfielder / Second baseman / Shortstop
- Born: November 26, 1866; New Bedford, Massachusetts, U.S.
- Died: May 27, 1949 (aged 82); New Bedford, Massachusetts, U.S.
- Batted: Right Threw: Right

MLB debut
- April 8, 1891, for the Cincinnati Kelly's Killers

Last MLB appearance
- July 13, 1897, for the Brooklyn Bridegrooms

MLB statistics
- Batting average: .223
- Home runs: 30
- Runs batted in: 287
- Stats at Baseball Reference

Teams
- Cincinnati Kelly's Killers (1891); Milwaukee Brewers (1891); Chicago Colts (1892); Cincinnati Reds (1893–1894); Brooklyn Bridegrooms (1897)

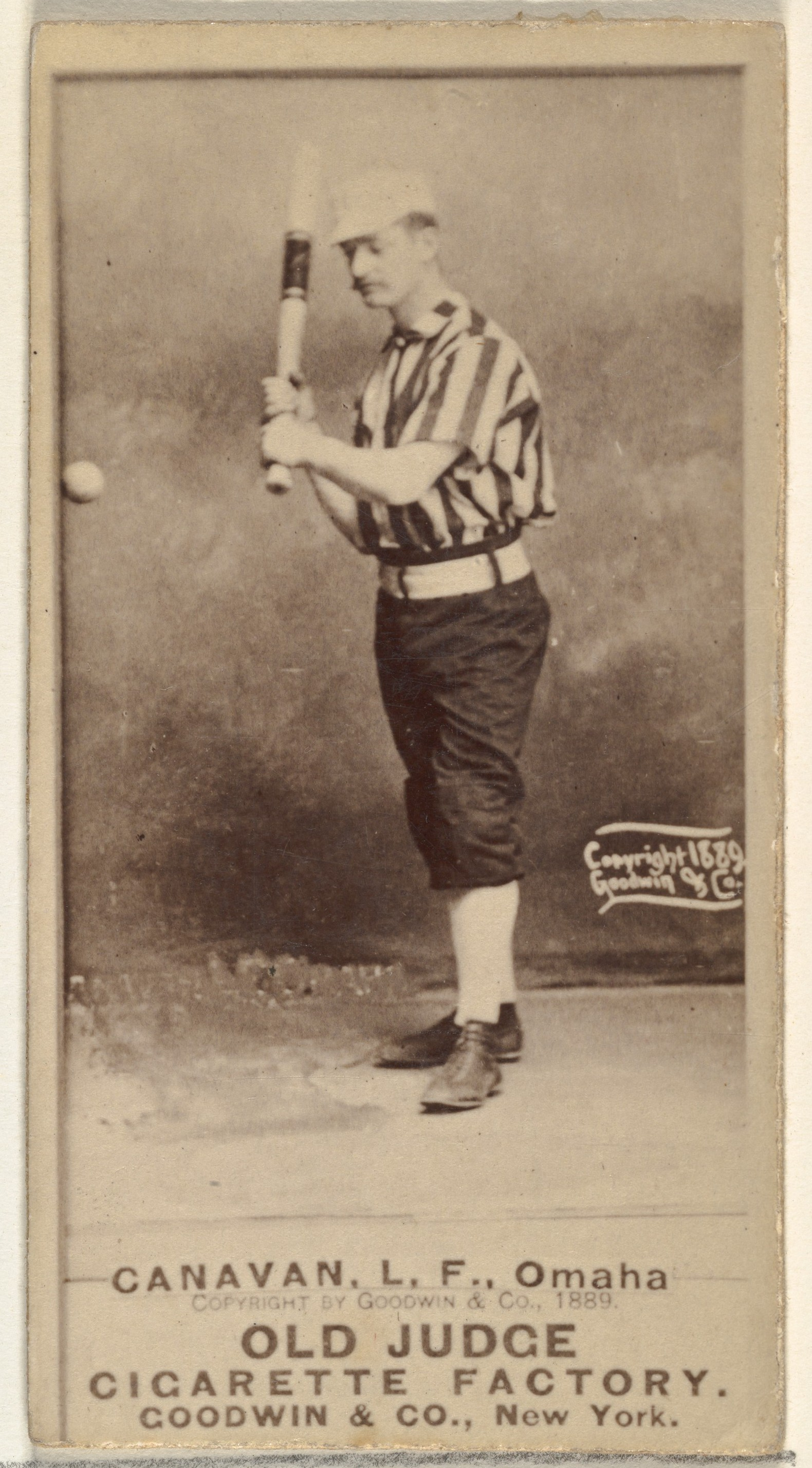
James Edward "Jim" Canavan, 1889, Burdick Collection, Metropolitan Museum of Art

James Edward Canavan (November 26, 1866 – May 27, 1949) was an American professional baseball player who played outfield and infield from 1891-1897 in the American Association and National League.
