= Lighthouse Point Park =

Park in New Haven, Connecticut, US

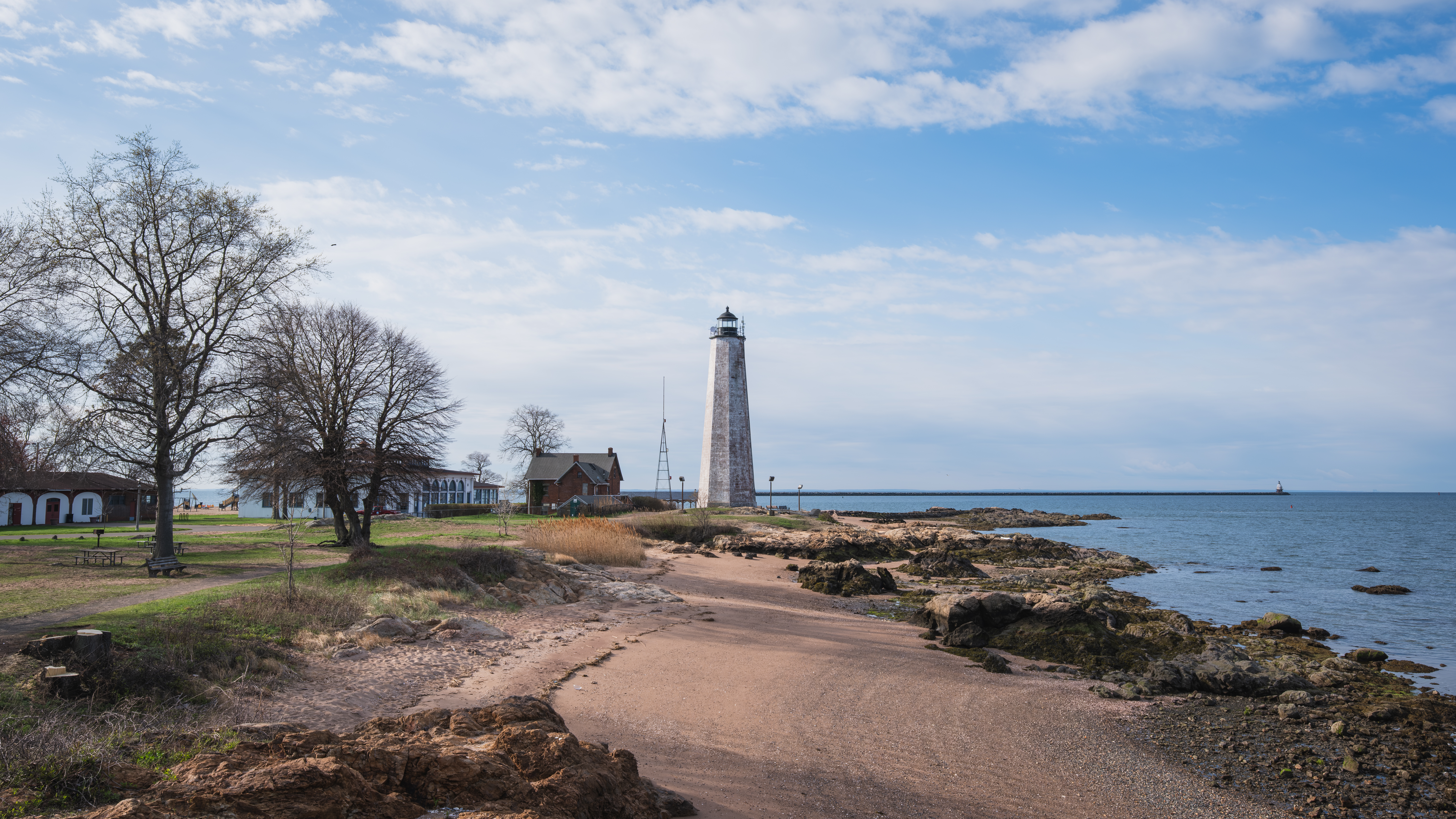

- Location within Connecticut
- Location: New Haven, Connecticut, United States
- Coordinates: 41°15′00″N 72°54′09″W
- Area: 82 acres (33 ha)
- Established: 1924
- Governing body: New Haven Parks, Recreation and Trees
- Website: Lighthouse Point Park

Lighthouse Point Park is a park in the city of New Haven, Connecticut, that is operated as a New Haven city park. The 82-acre park is located at the eastern point of New Haven Harbor in the East Shore neighborhood, and affords a view of Downtown New Haven.

The park features the deactivated Five Mile Point Light, which is open for tours on special events, and the Lighthouse Point Carousel, which is operated seasonally.

The land to the east of the federally-owned lighthouse was owned by the private Eastern Shore Amusement Company from 1911 to 1925 when it was sold to the city. (At that same time, the federal government sold the lighthouse itself to the city.) A baseball ground was part of the Eastern Shore property. It was used off-and-on for Sunday and exhibition games by the New Haven Blues minor league baseball club.

Lighthouse Point Park abuts the Morris Creek Nature Preserve, a 20-acre salt marsh that is partly owned by the New Haven Land Trust.

The park is located on the Atlantic flyway, a major migration route for butterflies, hawks, and many other bird species, which makes it a popular site for bird watching.

== See also ==
- Five Mile Point Light
- Lighthouse Point Carousel
