= Bill Carrick =

American baseball player (1873–1932)

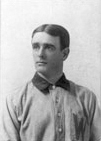
- Carrick in 1902, with the Washington Senators
- Pitcher
- Born: September 5, 1873; Erie, Pennsylvania, U.S.
- Died: March 7, 1932 (aged 58); Philadelphia, Pennsylvania, U.S.
- Batted: Right Threw: Right

MLB debut
- July 30, 1898, for the New York Giants

Last MLB appearance
- September 23, 1902, for the Washington Senators

MLB statistics
- Win–loss record: 63–89
- Strikeouts: 239
- Earned run average: 4.14
- Stats at Baseball Reference

Teams
- New York Giants (1898–1900); Washington Senators (1901–1902)

Career highlights and awards
- Led NL in complete games in 1899 (40); Led NL in games pitched in 1900 (45); Led NL in games started in 1899 (43) and 1900 (41)

William Martin Carrick (September 5, 1873 – March 7, 1932) was an American pitcher in Major League Baseball. He was nicknamed Doughnut Bill.

== Baseball career ==
Listed at 5 feet 10 inches (1.78 m) and 150 pounds (68 kg), Carrick batted and threw right-handed. He played for the New York Giants and the Washington Senators in a span of five seasons from 1898 through 1902.

Carrick's best pitch was the curveball. At one point during the 1901 season, he lost seventeen consecutive decisions.

== Later years ==
Following his major league career, Carrick continued to be active in professional ball in the minor leagues, while pitching for the Seattle Siwashes (1903), Toledo Mud Hens (1903), Fall River Indians (1905), Newark Sailors (1906–1907), and the New Haven Blues/New Haven Black Crows (1908/1909). He then managed for New Haven (renamed the Prairie Hens) in 1910.

Carrick died of heart disease at his home in the Frankford section of Philadelphia, Pennsylvania at the age of 58. Carrick would be buried in his family plot in Adrian, Michigan.
