= Bert Daly =

American baseball player (1881-1952)

- Infielder
- Born: April 8, 1881; Bayonne, New Jersey
- Died: September 3, 1952 (aged 71); Bayonne, New Jersey
- Batted: Right Threw: Right

MLB debut
- August 7, 1903, for the Philadelphia Athletics

Last MLB appearance
- September 5, 1903, for the Philadelphia Athletics

MLB statistics
- Batting average: .190
- Hits: 4
- RBI: 4
- Stats at Baseball Reference

Teams
- Philadelphia Athletics (1903)

Albert Joseph Daly (April 8, 1881 – September 3, 1952) was an American Major League Baseball infielder who played for the Philadelphia Athletics during the 1903 season while he was in medical school. He worked as a physician which became his entry point into politics and ended up serving five terms as mayor of his hometown of Bayonne, New Jersey to which he was elected both as a Republican and as a Democrat.

== Biography ==
Born and raised in Bayonne, Daly attended the University of Maryland, College Park. He received his medical training at Baltimore Medical College (since renamed University of Maryland Medical Center Midtown Campus).

Connie Mack recruited Daly in 1902 to play for the Newark Sailors minor league baseball team in the Eastern League. He played major league baseball in 1903 with the Philadelphia Athletics while he was still a student in medical school. From 1903 to 1906, Daly played for the Hartford Senators of the Connecticut League.

He was appointed in 1920 to serve as the physician of Hudson County, New Jersey, serving in that role until 1938.

== Political career ==
First elected as a Democrat to serve on the Bayonne City Council in 1909, Daly was elected as mayor of Bayonne in 1913 as a Republican, but lost a race for re-election in 1915. He won a second term as mayor in 1919, this time as a Democrat, and was re-elected in both 1923 and 1927. Daly had been running for mayor of Bayonne in 1939 against a Hague-supported ticket, but dropped out in March due to health issues. He was elected to his fifth term of office in 1943. In 1946, while serving his fifth and final term in office, Daly faced indictment on charges of official misconduct relating to claims that he had and the city's police chief had failed to deal with bookmaking and gambling in Bayonne, though the charges against him were later thrown out.

In March 1947, Daly announced that he would be supporting a slate of candidates running for Bayonne city council in opposition to the official slate that was being supported by Hudson County Democratic Party boss Frank Hague. Later that month, with the break with Hague complete, and having lost support from the party, Daly stepped down as mayor.
