= Howard Avenue Grounds =

Stadium in New Haven, Connecticut

Howard Avenue Grounds was a baseball park in New Haven, Connecticut.

The park was home to the New Haven Elm Citys baseball team which played in the National Association during the 1875 season. It is considered a major league ballpark by those who count the National Association as a major league as well as by those who recognize isolated games, as the Hartford Dark Blues club hosted one National League game there late in the 1877 season. It also served as the home field for the New Haven Blues minor league teams until the late 1890s.

The grounds were acquired by the Elm City club early in 1875. The field was not ready by Opening Day, forcing New Haven to play their first home game at Hamilton Park. The first game the Elm Citys played at the Howard Avenue Grounds was an exhibition against Yale; the first major league game there took place on April 26, against the 1875 Brookyln Atlantics. Although the field and fences were complete for these contests, the grandstand and bleacher seats were not.

The 1879 map indicates the ballpark was bounded by Howard Avenue (west, home plate); Spring Street (north, left field); Cedar Street (east, center field); and railroad tracks (south, right field). It may have been the first baseball venue which sold advertising on its fences.

By the late 1890s the lot had been sold to developers. It is now occupied by residences. Rosette Street cuts through what was once the right field area.

The railroad tracks still exist along with the large rail yards; they lead into on the east side of Cedar Street.
