= Five Mile Point Light =

Lighthouse in Connecticut, United States

Five Mile Point Light Old New Haven
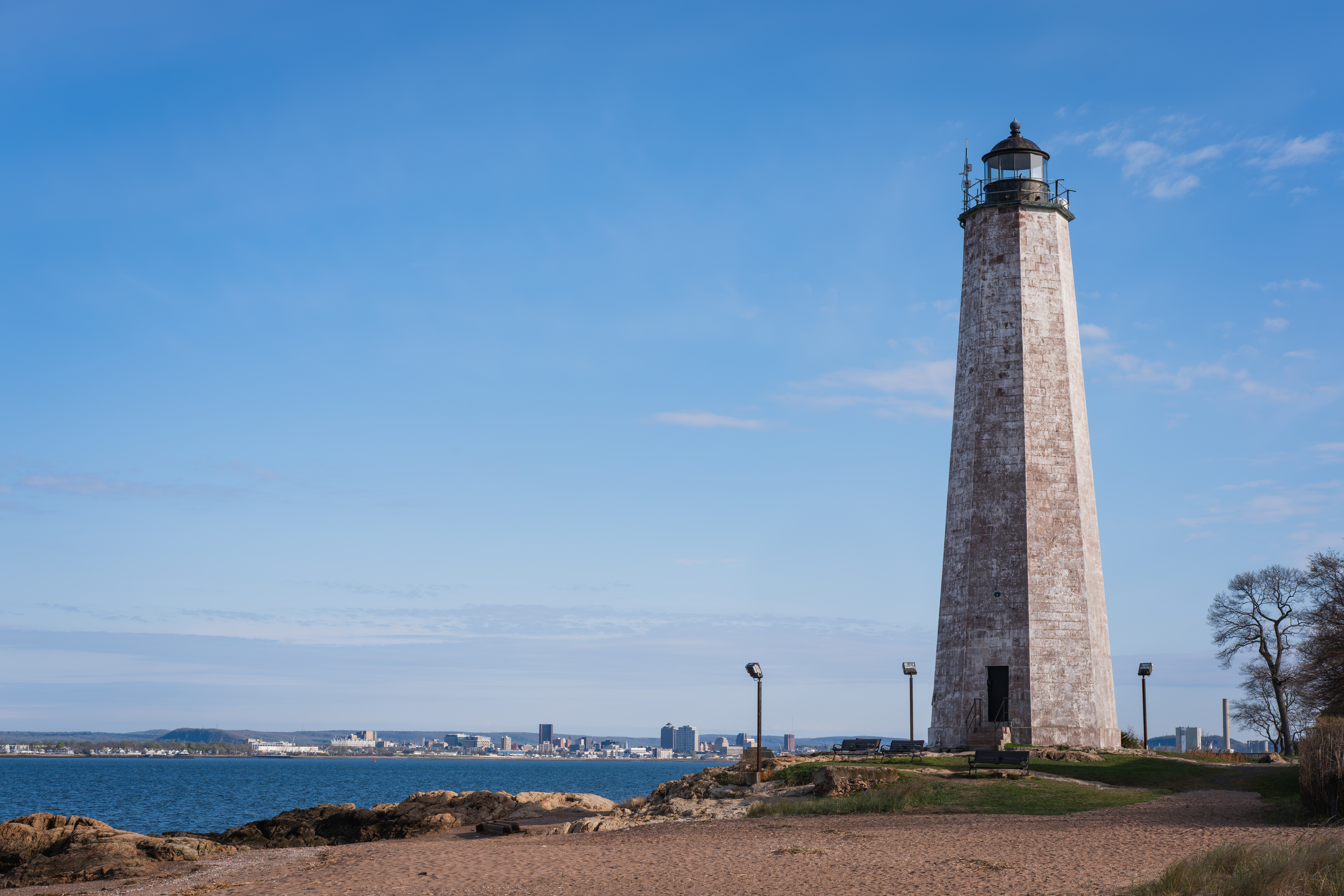
- Five Mile Point Light in 2026
- Location: New Haven County, United States
- Coordinates: 41°14′56″N 72°54′14″W

Tower
- Constructed: 1847
- Construction: brownstone (tower), brownstone (basement)
- Height: 80 ft (24 m)
- Shape: octagonal tower with balcony and lantern
- Markings: White (tower), black (lantern)
- Operator: Lighthouse Point Park
- Heritage: National Register of Historic Places listed place

Light
- First lit: 1847
- Deactivated: 1877
- Lens: 12 lamps, 21 inch reflectors (1845); Fourth order Fresnel lens (1855)
- Range: 10 nmi (19 km; 12 mi)
- Characteristic: decorative light
- Five Mile Point Lighthouse
- U.S. National Register of Historic Places
- Location: Lighthouse Point Park, New Haven, Connecticut
- Area: less than one acre
- Built: 1845
- Architect: Marcus Bassett
- Architectural style: Lighthouse
- NRHP reference No.: 90001108
- Added to NRHP: August 1, 1990

Five Mile Point Light, also known as Five Mile Point Lighthouse or Old New Haven Harbor Lighthouse, is a U.S. lighthouse in Long Island Sound on the coast of New Haven, Connecticut. Located at the entrance to New Haven Harbor, the beacon's name derives from its proximity to Downtown New Haven, about five miles (8 km) away. The original lighthouse, built in 1805, was a 30-foot (9.1 m) octagonal wooden tower. In 1847, a new 80-foot (24 m) octagonal stone tower was constructed by Marcus Bassett using East Haven brownstone. This new beacon was illuminated by 12 lamps with reflectors. A fourth-order Fresnel lens replaced the lamps in 1855, and a fog bell was added in the 1860s. The Five Mile Point Light was deactivated in 1877 when the nearby Southwest Ledge Light was completed. The lighthouse is now contained within Lighthouse Point Park and, along with the keeper's house, was listed on the National Register of Historic Places in 1990.

== History ==
In July 1779, during the American Revolutionary War, British troops anchored offshore and staged an invasion of New Haven. Patriot forces launched a defense of the beachfront at what would later become the site of the Five Mile Point Light. The first British soldier killed in the skirmish was Ensign and Adjutant Watkins of the King's American regiment, who was shot while attempting to disembark. The British suffered heavy losses and ultimately abandoned their advance on New Haven. However, before retreating, they did manage to burn several nearby residences, including the house of Amos Morris.

== Original tower ==
In 1804, the United States Congress passed a statute requiring the Secretary of the Treasury to build a lighthouse at Five Mile Point if land could be obtained for a reasonable price. That same year, Amos Morris Jr. sold a suitable one-acre plot of his father's coastal estate to the federal government for $100. On March 16, 1805, an appropriation for $2500 was issued for the construction of the lighthouse. A 30-foot (9.1 m) octagonal wooden tower was built by Abisha Woodward on the southwest edge of the harbor to mark the path around the Southwest Ledge. The fixed white light was made by eight oil lamps with 13 inches (33 cm) parabolic reflectors; it was criticized at the time for being too dim. A keeper's quarters was constructed in 1805. Amos Morris Jr. served as the first keeper, albeit for only three weeks. An 1832 report noted that the light was 50 feet (15 m) above the water and that its visibility had been improved by the removal of some trees. In 1838, Lieutenant George M. Bache reported that the wooden tower and keeper's house was in a poor state. Congress appropriated $10,000 to construct a new stone lighthouse on March 3, 1847.

== Current tower ==
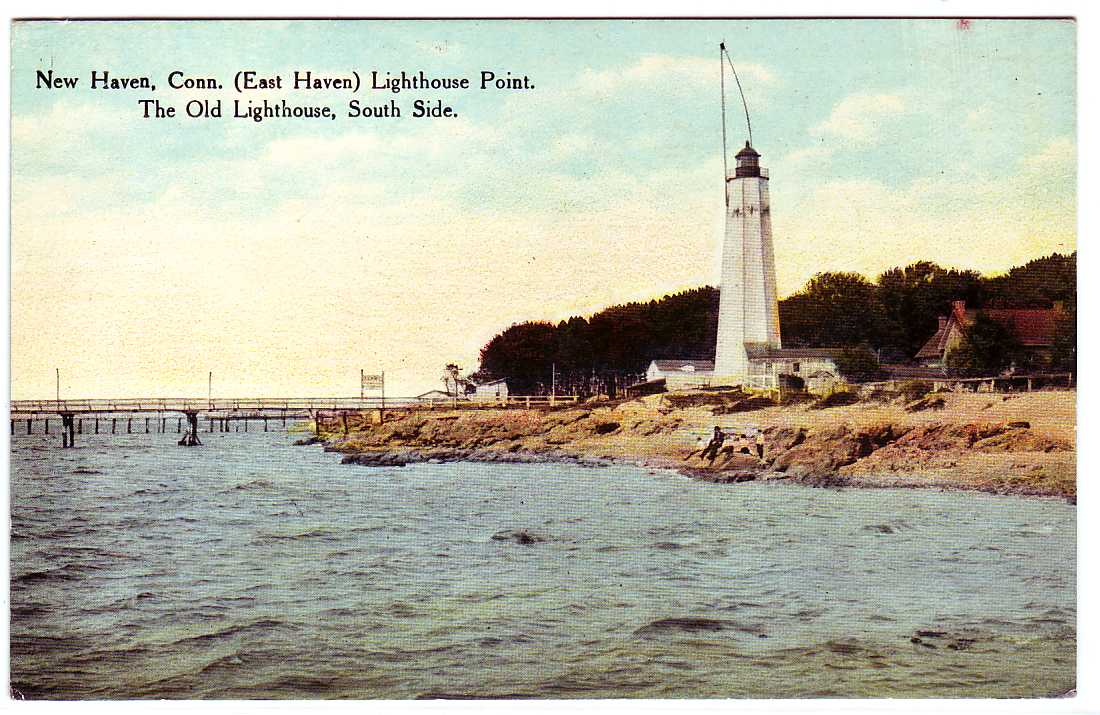
Postcard, about 1912

The new 80-foot (24 m) octagonal tower was constructed by Marcus Bassett using East Haven brownstone from Jabez Potter's quarry. The interior of the lighthouse was lined with New Haven brick, and a 74-step granite stairway leads to the cast-iron lantern. The light was powered by 12 lamps with reflectors and was located 97 feet (30 m) above sea level. A new 2 1/2-story brick house was also constructed to replace the original, which was in a "very bad state of repair". The light was replaced with a fourth-order Fresnel lens in 1855. In the 1860s, a fog bell was also added.

The lighthouse was extinguished in 1877 when the offshore Southwest Ledge Light replaced it for navigation. The keeper, Elizur Thompson, served as the Southwest Ledge Light's keeper for five years before returning to live in the Five Mile Point Light keeper's quarters to fly storm signal flags for the United States Weather Bureau. In 1896, the lighthouse was transferred to the United States Department of War and was improved by a lessee named Albert Widmann. In 1922, the property was divided; the land was given to the State of Connecticut, while the buildings were given to the city of New Haven. Two years later, New Haven purchased the land from the State for $11,180. The tower was renovated in 1986. The $86,000 restoration included repairing cracked mortar, steam cleaning the interior and exterior, and removing "guano [that had] accumulated over the decades".

== Importance ==
Roth and Clouette note that the "Five Mile Point Lighthouse is significant because it embodies the distinctive characteristics of American lighthouse construction during the first half of the 19th century ... [it] is also significant in the maritime history of New Haven." The keeper's dwelling is currently a private residence for New Haven Recreation Department personnel and has been modified with the addition of a porch. The lighthouse and the keeper's residence were listed on the National Register of Historic Places in 1990.

== List of keepers ==
Name	Year	Service Notes
Amos Morris, Jr	1805	
Wedmore	1805	
Jonathan Finch	1805–1821	
William Finch	1821–1824	
Elihu Ives	1824–1846	
George W. Hicks	1846–1849	
Stephen Willard	1849–1853	
Merritt Thompson	1853–1860	
Elizur Thompson	1860–1867	Served again as keeper after Charles W. Bradley.
Charles W. Bradley	1867–1869	
Elizur Thompson	1869–1877	Elizabeth Thompson was an assistant from 1869 to 1871. Theodore Thompson was an assistance from 1871 to 1873. George Thompson was an assistant from 1873 to 1876. Sidney Thompson was an assistant in 1876.

== See also ==
- List of lighthouses in the United States
- List of lighthouses in Connecticut
- National Register of Historic Places listings in New Haven, Connecticut
