= Edgewood Park, New Haven =

Park in New Haven, Connecticut, United States

Coordinates: 41.324°N 72.958°W

Edgewood Park
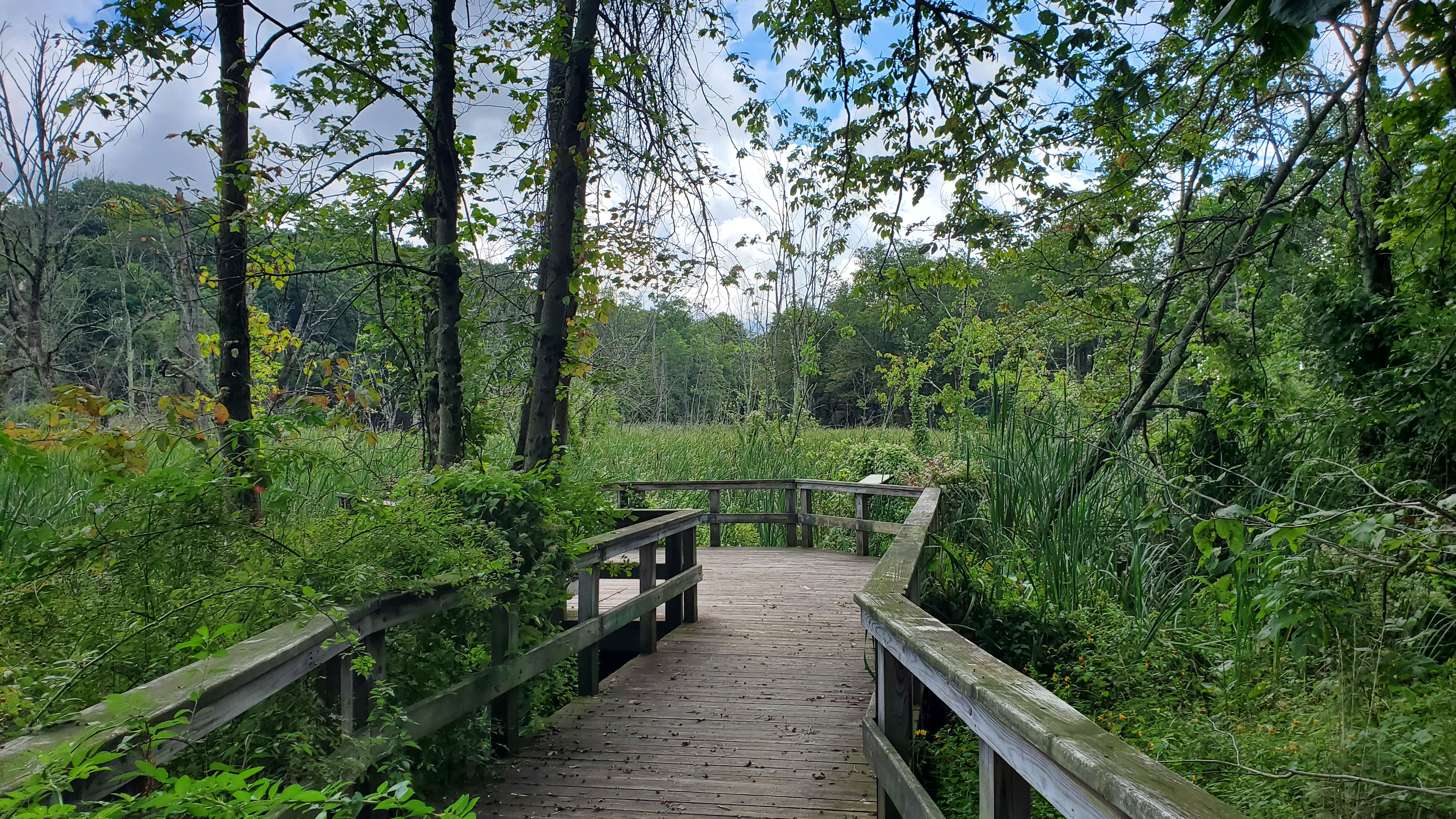
- A wetlands-viewing platform for birdwatching in Edgewood Park.

- Location within Connecticut
- Location: New Haven, Connecticut
- Coordinates: 41.324682, -72.958182
- Area: 120 acres (49 ha)
- Created: 1910
- Operator: New Haven Parks & Recreation
- Open: Sunrise to sunset, every day

Edgewood Park is a public park located in City of New Haven, Connecticut, United States, between the Edgewood and Westville neighborhoods of the city. The park is over 120 acres along the West River, with walking trails by ponds and wetlands and a wetlands viewing platform. Park amenities include a gazebo, dog run, playground, skate park, tennis courts, and a basketball court. The park also features memorials for the Spanish–American War and the Holocaust.

== History ==
In 1889, the City of New Haven "adopted" sixty acres of property which they turned over to the new Park Commission for development. Nicholas W. Hubinger, James Mason, and Donald Mitchell made additional donations of land for the park. Mitchell, an author and agriculturist whose pen name was "Ik Marvel" lived above Forest Road on his Farm, "Edgewood," the namesake of the park.

In 1910, Frederick Law Olmsted Jr. designed the layout of the present park. It included an extensive rose garden, a "grandmother's garden," a lily pond, an archery field, groves and glens, trails, carriage drives and a bridle path over three miles long. A spring of cold pure water at the corner of Stanley Street and Ella T. Grasso Boulevard was used by the local residents in the summertime; it was later made into a drinking fountain.

== Skate Park ==
A major draw to Edgewood Park is the Edgewood Skate Park, the only skate park in New Haven. It used to be skating rink, and is housed next to the Coogan Pavilion.

== Duck Pond Restoration ==
The Edgewood Park Pond, better known as the duck pond — a staple sight of Edgewood Park — is a small pond located below Chapel Street between Yale Avenue and Ella T. Grasso Boulevard. Historically this area was a flood plain for the west river, although after years of development and alterations to the natural water flow, the ecosystem was drastically changed. The river flows into Long Island Sound which has effects on the water’s level and salinity. Around 1920, tide gates were constructed at multiple points along the river to prevent ocean water from travelling upstream and to protect areas from tide related flooding. In doing so, land along the river became suitable for development; however the river itself began degrading.

In 2009, Save the Sound, an organization aimed towards protecting and rebuilding Long Island Sound, received $2.2 million under the American Recovery and Reinvestment Act. This act from the NOAA Restoration Center allowed for two projects, one along the west river and one in the duck pond itself. Three of the tide gates were removed and replaced with new self-regulating tide gates. These new gates allowed for the flow of water in both directions recreating the natural tide through more of the river. These gates also include safety features which automatically close the gates if water levels rise too far in order to prevent excessive flooding.

The duck pond underwent massive transformation in order to restore the natural habitat. Old concrete walkways were removed and raised wooden bridges were put in place to allow water to flow freely underneath. Native plant species were planted in order to begin rebuilding proper vegetation in the area. With the final measures being completed in 2016 it is too early to see drastic improvements in habitat but local fishermen have said the changes have helped. These two projects are great examples of restoration ecology being implemented in the city of New Haven.
