= George Bone =

American baseball player (1874-1918)

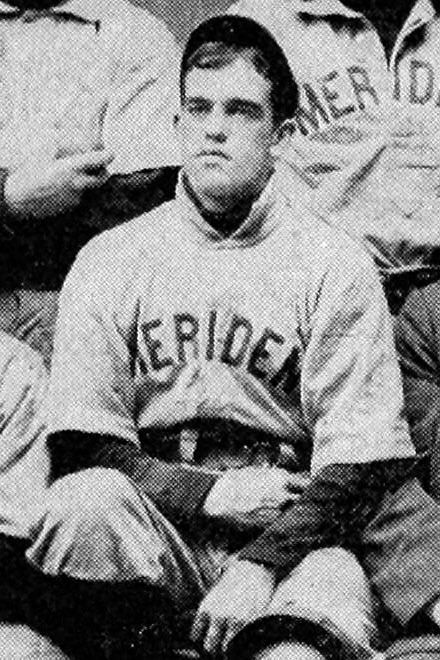
- Shortstop
- Born: August 28, 1874; New Haven, Connecticut, U.S.
- Died: May 26, 1918 (aged 43); West Haven, Connecticut, U.S.
- Batted: Switch Threw: Right

MLB debut
- September 18, 1901, for the Milwaukee Brewers

Last MLB appearance
- September 28, 1901, for the Milwaukee Brewers

MLB statistics
- Batting average: .302
- Home runs: 0
- Runs batted in: 6
- Stats at Baseball Reference

Teams
- Milwaukee Brewers (1901)

George Drummond Bone (August 28, 1874 – May 26, 1918) was an American professional baseball player. Bone played for the Milwaukee Brewers in 1901. He was a switch hitter, and threw right-handed.
