= Lee Viau =

American baseball player (1866–1947)

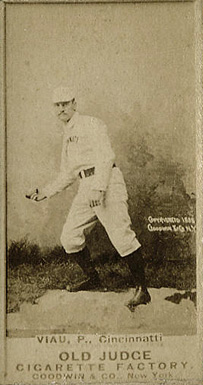
- Pitcher
- Born: July 5, 1866; Corinth, Vermont, U.S.
- Died: December 17, 1947 (aged 81); Hopewell, New Jersey, U.S.
- Batted: Right Threw: Right

MLB debut
- April 22, 1888, for the Cincinnati Red Stockings

Last MLB appearance
- August 27, 1892, for the Boston Beaneaters

MLB statistics
- Win–loss record: 83–77
- Earned run average: 3.33
- Strikeouts: 554
- Stats at Baseball Reference

Teams
- Cincinnati Red Stockings / Reds (1888–1890); Cleveland Spiders (1890–1892); Louisville Colonels (1892); Boston Beaneaters (1892)

Leon A. Viau (July 5, 1866 – December 17, 1947) was an American professional baseball player who played pitcher in the Major Leagues from 1888 to 1892. Viau played for the Cincinnati Red Stockings/Reds, Cleveland Spiders, Louisville Colonels, and Boston Beaneaters.

Viau was regarded as one of the best-looking players of his time.
