= New Haven Profs =

American minor-league baseball team

- 1878–1932; (1878, 1885, 1887, 1889–1892, 1894, 1896, 1898–1932); New Haven, Connecticut

Minor league affiliations
- Previous classes: Class A (1891, 1919–1932); Class B (1894, 1905–1914, 1916–1918); Class D (1902–1904); Class F (1898–1901)
- League: Eastern League (1916–1932); Colonial League (1915); Eastern Association (1913–1914); Connecticut State League (1904–1912); Connecticut League (1903); Connecticut State League (1900–1902); Connecticut League (1899); Connecticut State League (1898); Atlantic League (1896); Naugatuck Valley League (1896); Connecticut State League (1894); Eastern League (1892); Eastern Association (1891); Atlantic Association (1889–1890); Eastern League (1887); Southern New England League (1885); International Association (1878)

Minor league titles
- League titles: 1912, 1917, 1920, 1922, 1928

Team data
- Previous names: New Haven Bulldogs (1931–1932); New Haven Profs (1923–1930); New Haven Indians (1921–1922); New Haven Weissmen (1919–1920); New Haven Murlins (1916–1918); New Haven White Wings (1913–1915); New Haven Murlins (1911–1912); New Haven Prairie Hens (1910); New Haven Black Crows (1909); New Haven Blues (1899–1908); New Haven Students (1898); New Haven Texas Steers (1896); New Haven Edgewoods (1896); New Haven Elm Citys (1894); New Haven Nutmegs (1891–1892); New Haven (1889–1890); New Haven Blues (1887); New Haven (1878, 1885)

The New Haven Profs was one of the longest lasting names of a minor league baseball team that was located in New Haven, Connecticut, and played primarily in the Eastern League and Connecticut League from 1878 to 1932.

== See also ==
New Haven Blues (baseball)
