= Mike Hickey =

American baseball player (1871–1918)

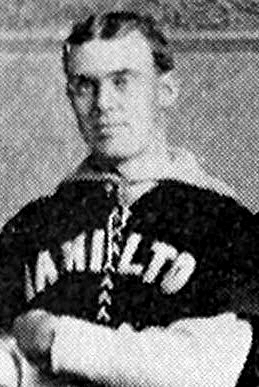
- Second baseman
- Born: December 25, 1871; Chicopee, Massachusetts, U.S.
- Died: June 11, 1918 (aged 46); Springfield, Massachusetts, U.S.
- Batted: Right Threw: Right

MLB debut
- September 14, 1899, for the Boston Beaneaters

Last MLB appearance
- September 14, 1899, for the Boston Beaneaters

MLB statistics
- Batting average: .333
- Home runs: 0
- Runs batted in: 0
- Stats at Baseball Reference

Teams
- Boston Beaneaters (1899)

Michael Francis Hickey (December 25, 1871 – June 11, 1918) was an American second baseman in Major League Baseball. He played in one game for the Boston Beaneaters of the National League on September 14, 1899. He played college ball at the College of the Holy Cross and he had an extensive minor league career from 1893 through 1905.
