= 1907 Philadelphia Athletics season =

1907 Philadelphia Athletics
- League: American League
- Ballpark: Columbia Park
- City: Philadelphia
- Record: 88–57 (.607)
- League place: 2nd
- Owners: Benjamin Shibe, Tom Shibe, John Shibe, Connie Mack, Sam Jones, Frank Hough
- Managers: Connie Mack

The 1907 Philadelphia Athletics season involved the A's finishing second in the American League with a record of 88 wins and 57 losses.

== Preseason ==
=== 1907 Philadelphia City Series ===
AL Philadelphia Athletics (0) vs. NL Philadelphia Phillies (4)

| Game | Date | Score | Location | Time | Attendance |
|---|---|---|---|---|---|
| 1 | April 3, 1907 | Philadelphia Phillies – 1, Philadelphia Athletics – 0 | Columbia Park | 1:15 | - |
| 2 | April 4, 1907 | Philadelphia Athletics – 1, Philadelphia Phillies – 4 | Philadelphia Ball Park | 1:43 | 5,278 |
| 3 | April 5, 1907 | Philadelphia Phillies – 1, Philadelphia Athletics – 0 | Columbia Park | 1:40 | 3,172 |
| 4 | April 6, 1907 | Philadelphia Athletics – 5, Philadelphia Phillies – 9 | Philadelphia Ball Park | 1:45 | 5,145 |
| 5 | April 8, 1907 | No Game - Wet Grounds | Columbia Park | - | - |
| 6 | April 9, 1907 | No Game - Rain | Philadelphia Ball Park | - | - |

The Phillies sweep dropped the Athletics to 18–19 against the Phillies all-time in the city series.

== Regular season ==
The Athletics and Detroit Tigers vied for the pennant through the 1907 season. The Tigers came into Philadelphia for a three game series on September 27, 1907 in a virtual tie for first-place. Detroit took the first game 5-4 to move in front of an official attendance of 17,926, exceeding Columbia Park's capacity. Saturday's game was postponed by rain, and Pennsylvania Blue Laws precluded play on Sunday. A double-header was scheduled for Monday. Detroit's Bill Donovan had pitched a complete game in the Friday game and was slated to start both games of the double-header.

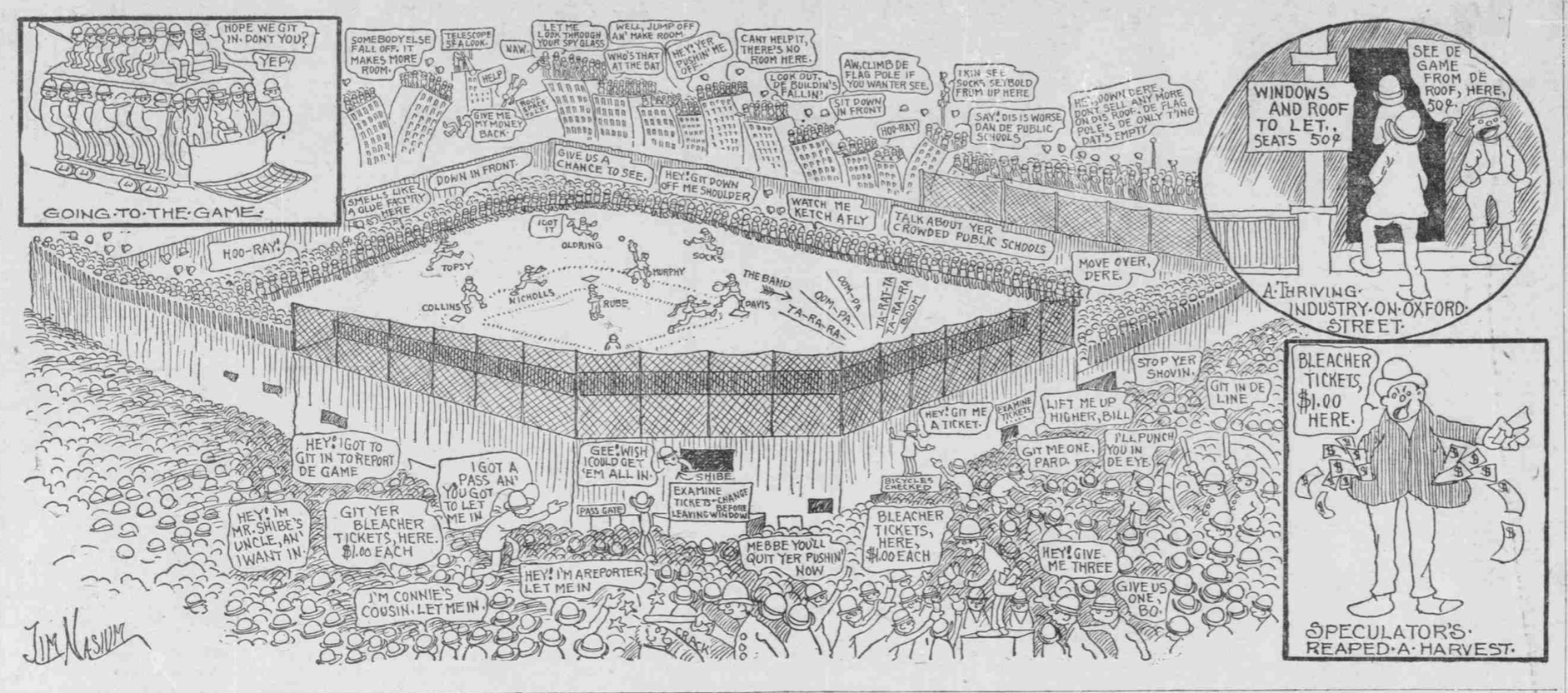
"As Jim Nasium saw the game from a point of vantage outside the grounds" following Athletics-Tigers game, September 30, 1907 at Columbia Park in Philadelphia Inquirer (October 1, 1907)

With a week left in the season, Athletics fans were eager to see the team capture the pennant. It was estimated that the team could have sold 50,000 tickets to the Monday double-header. With Columbia Park's limited capacity, an overflow crowd spilled into a roped-off area on the outfield grass. The gates were locked 30 minutes before game time with thousands of fans outside unable to gain admittance. Fans stormed the gates and climbed over the outside fence, with more than the official 24,127 seeing the game. The Philadelphia Inquirer would remark on the crowd, "Never before in the history of the national game has so great and remarkable a gathering of its enthusiastic followers been held anywhere." Fans scaled trolley and telegraph poles to watch the game. Local residents charged as much as $1 to $5 a person ($35 to $125 in 2025-dollars) to watch the game from windows. On the Twenty-ninth street side of the park, a fan in the grandstand lowered a rope up which fans scrambled from the street and into the park. Large men charged ten-cents to boost fans over the fence and into the park. Down by six in the fifth, the Tigers came into the ninth down 8-6. Sam Crawford opened the ninth with a single off of future Hall of Fame Rube Waddell bringing 20-year year old Ty Cobb to the plate. Cobb crushed Waddell's pitch, clearing the right-field fence by fifty-feet and onto 29th Street for a game-tying homerun. The teams both scored in the eleventh and would battle to a 9-9 tie in 17-innings before darkness ended the game. The Philadelphia Inquirer would call it "the most remarkable game ever played on the Athletic ground." Reflecting on his career in 1930, Cobb would tell Grantland Rice, "The biggest thrill I ever got came in a game was against the Athletics in 1907 [on September 30]... The Athletics had us beaten, with Rube Waddell pitching. They were two runs ahead in the 9th inning, when I happened to hit a home run that tied the score. This game went 17 innings to a tie, and a few days later, we clinched our first pennant. You can understand what it meant for a 20-year-old country boy to hit a home run off the great Rube, in a pennant-winning game with two outs in the ninth."

=== Season standings ===
American League
| Team | W | L | Pct. | GB | Home | Road |
|---|---|---|---|---|---|---|
| Detroit Tigers | 92 | 58 | .613 | — | 50‍–‍27 | 42‍–‍31 |
| Philadelphia Athletics | 88 | 57 | .607 | 1½ | 50‍–‍20 | 38‍–‍37 |
| Chicago White Sox | 87 | 64 | .576 | 5½ | 48‍–‍29 | 39‍–‍35 |
| Cleveland Naps | 85 | 67 | .559 | 8 | 46‍–‍31 | 39‍–‍36 |
| New York Highlanders | 70 | 78 | .473 | 21 | 32‍–‍41 | 38‍–‍37 |
| St. Louis Browns | 69 | 83 | .454 | 24 | 36‍–‍40 | 33‍–‍43 |
| Boston Americans | 59 | 90 | .396 | 32½ | 34‍–‍41 | 25‍–‍49 |
| Washington Senators | 49 | 102 | .325 | 43½ | 26‍–‍48 | 23‍–‍54 |

=== Record vs. opponents ===
1907 American League record Sources:
| Team | BOS | CWS | CLE | DET | NYH | PHA | SLB | WSH |
|---|---|---|---|---|---|---|---|---|
| Boston | — | 10–11–3 | 8–13 | 6–16 | 8–12–1 | 8–14–2 | 10–12 | 9–12 |
| Chicago | 11–10–3 | — | 10–11–1 | 13–9–1 | 12–10 | 10–12–1 | 16–6 | 15–6 |
| Cleveland | 13–8 | 11–10–1 | — | 11–11–1 | 15–7 | 8–14 | 12–10–2 | 15–7–2 |
| Detroit | 16–6 | 9–13–1 | 11–11–1 | — | 13–8 | 11–8–1 | 14–8 | 18–4 |
| New York | 12–8–1 | 10–12 | 7–15 | 8–13 | — | 10–9–1 | 8–14–1 | 15–7–1 |
| Philadelphia | 14–8–2 | 12–10–1 | 14–8 | 8–11–1 | 9–10–1 | — | 14–6 | 17–4 |
| St. Louis | 12–10 | 6–16 | 10–12–2 | 8–14 | 14–8–1 | 6–14 | — | 13–9 |
| Washington | 12–9 | 6–15 | 7–15–2 | 4–18 | 7–15–1 | 4–17 | 9–13 | — |

=== Roster ===
1907 Philadelphia Athletics
Roster
| Pitchers: Bill Bartley; Chief Bender; Jack Coombs; George Craig; Jimmy Dygert; Charlie Fritz; Sam Hope; Eddie Plank; Rube Vickers; Rube Waddell | Catchers: Claude Berry; Doc Powers; Ossee Schreckengost; Infielders: Eddie Collins; Jimmy Collins; Monte Cross; Harry Davis; John Knight; Danny Murphy; Simon Nicholls | Outfielders: Topsy Hartsel; Bris Lord; Rube Oldring; Socks Seybold | Manager: Connie Mack |

== Player stats ==
=== Batting ===
==== Starters by position ====
Note: Pos = Position; G = Games played; AB = At bats; H = Hits; Avg. = Batting average; HR = Home runs; RBI = Runs batted in

| Pos | Player | G | AB | H | Avg. | HR | RBI |
|---|---|---|---|---|---|---|---|
| C | Ossee Schrecongost | 101 | 356 | 97 | .272 | 0 | 38 |
| 1B | Harry Davis | 149 | 582 | 155 | .266 | 8 | 87 |
| 2B | Danny Murphy | 124 | 469 | 127 | .271 | 2 | 57 |
| SS | Simon Nicholls | 124 | 460 | 139 | .302 | 0 | 23 |
| 3B | Jimmy Collins | 99 | 364 | 99 | .272 | 0 | 35 |
| OF | Topsy Hartsel | 143 | 507 | 142 | .280 | 3 | 29 |
| OF | Rube Oldring | 117 | 441 | 126 | .286 | 1 | 40 |
| OF | Socks Seybold | 147 | 564 | 153 | .271 | 5 | 92 |

==== Other batters ====
Note: G = Games played; AB = At bats; H = Hits; Avg. = Batting average; HR = Home runs; RBI = Runs batted in

| Player | G | AB | H | Avg. | HR | RBI |
|---|---|---|---|---|---|---|
| Monte Cross | 77 | 248 | 51 | .206 | 0 | 18 |
| Bris Lord | 57 | 170 | 31 | .182 | 1 | 11 |
| Doc Powers | 59 | 159 | 29 | .182 | 0 | 9 |
| John Knight | 40 | 139 | 29 | .209 | 0 | 12 |
| Eddie Collins | 14 | 23 | 8 | .348 | 0 | 2 |
| Claude Berry | 8 | 19 | 4 | .211 | 0 | 1 |

=== Pitching ===
==== Starting pitchers ====
Note: G = Games pitched; IP = Innings pitched; W = Wins; L = Losses; ERA = Earned run average; SO = Strikeouts

| Player | G | IP | W | L | ERA | SO |
|---|---|---|---|---|---|---|
| Eddie Plank | 43 | 343.2 | 24 | 16 | 2.20 | 183 |
| Rube Waddell | 44 | 284.2 | 19 | 13 | 2.15 | 232 |
| Jimmy Dygert | 42 | 261.2 | 21 | 8 | 2.34 | 151 |
| Chief Bender | 33 | 219.1 | 16 | 8 | 2.05 | 112 |
| Jack Coombs | 23 | 132.2 | 6 | 9 | 3.12 | 73 |
| Charlie Fritz | 1 | 3.0 | 0 | 0 | 3.00 | 1 |

==== Other pitchers ====
Note: G = Games pitched; IP = Innings pitched; W = Wins; L = Losses; ERA = Earned run average; SO = Strikeouts

| Player | G | IP | W | L | ERA | SO |
|---|---|---|---|---|---|---|
| Bill Bartley | 15 | 56.1 | 0 | 1 | 2.24 | 16 |
| Rube Vickers | 10 | 50.1 | 2 | 2 | 3.40 | 21 |

==== Relief pitchers ====
Note: G = Games pitched; W = Wins; L = Losses; SV = Saves; ERA = Earned run average; SO = Strikeouts

| Player | G | W | L | SV | ERA | SO |
|---|---|---|---|---|---|---|
| George Craig | 2 | 0 | 0 | 0 | 10.80 | 0 |
| Bris Lord | 1 | 0 | 0 | 0 | 9.00 | 0 |
| Sam Hope | 1 | 0 | 0 | 0 | 0.00 | 0 |
