= 1907 Boston Americans season =

Major League Baseball season

1907 Boston Americans
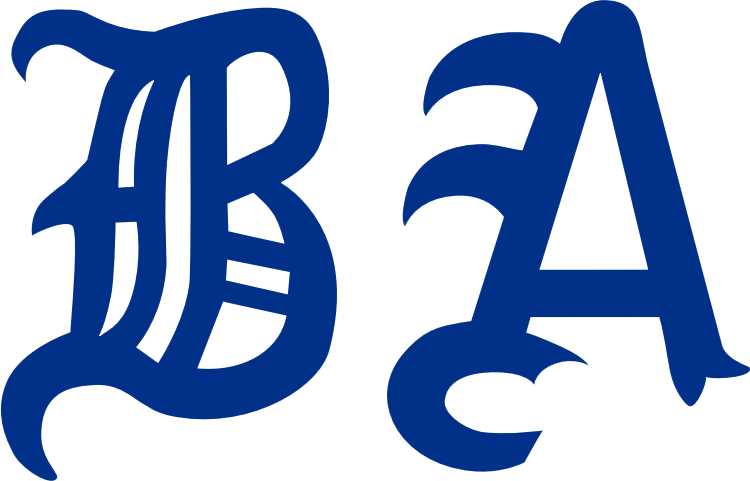
- League: American League
- Ballpark: Huntington Avenue Grounds
- City: Boston, Massachusetts
- Record: 59–90 (.396)
- League place: 7th
- Owners: John I. Taylor
- Managers: Chick Stahl (preseason); Cy Young (3–3); George Huff (2–6); Bob Unglaub (9–20); Deacon McGuire (45–61)
- Stats: ESPN.com; Baseball Reference

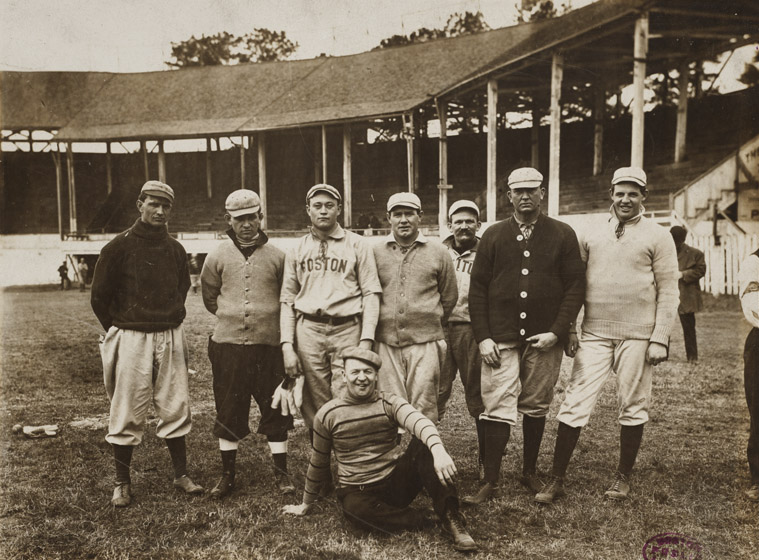
1907 spring training at West End Park in Little Rock, Arkansas, with Cy Young second from right

The 1907 Boston Americans season was the seventh season for the professional baseball franchise that later became known as the Boston Red Sox. The Americans finished seventh in the American League (AL) with a record of 59 wins and 90 losses, 32 1/2 games behind the Detroit Tigers. Including spring training, the team had five different managers. The team played its home games at Huntington Avenue Grounds.

== Pre-season ==
- March: The team held spring training in Little Rock, Arkansas.
- March 28: During spring training, player-manager Chick Stahl died by suicide.

== Regular season ==
- April 11: The regular season opens with an 8–4 win in 14 innings over the Philadelphia Athletics at Columbia Park in Philadelphia.
- April 16: In the home opener, the Americans defeat the visiting Washington Senators, 4–2.
- April 20: George Huff takes over as manager, after Cy Young managed the team for the first six games of the season.
- April 24: The team releases Buck Freeman.
- May 1: Bob Unglaub becomes player-manager, taking over from George Huff.
- June 7: Third baseman and former manager Jimmy Collins is traded to the Philadelphia Athletics for John Knight.
- June 10: Deacon McGuire becomes manager, taking over from Bob Unglaub.
- July 15: In their longest game of the season, the Americans defeat the St. Louis Browns, 5–2 in 16 innings at Sportsman's Park in St. Louis.
- September 12: Future Hall of Famer Tris Speaker makes his major league debut in a road game against Philadelphia.
- October 3: After going winless since September 11, the team ends an 0–16–2 stretch with a 1–0 win over the visiting Browns.
- October 5: The regular season ends with a 3–3 tie in 11 innings against the New York Highlanders at Hilltop Park in New York City.

=== Statistical leaders ===
The offense was led by Bob Unglaub (62 RBIs), Bunk Congalton (.286 batting average), and Hobe Ferris (four home runs). The pitching staff was led by Cy Young, who made 43 appearances (37 starts) and pitched 33 complete games with a 21–15 record and 1.99 ERA, while striking out 147 in 343 1/3 innings. No other pitcher had a winning record; Cy Morgan had a 6–6 record with 1.97 ERA in 16 games (13 starts).

=== Season standings ===
American League
Team	W	L	Pct.	GB	Home	Road
Detroit Tigers	92	58	.613	—	50‍–‍27	42‍–‍31
Philadelphia Athletics	88	57	.607	1½	50‍–‍20	38‍–‍37
Chicago White Sox	87	64	.576	5½	48‍–‍29	39‍–‍35
Cleveland Naps	85	67	.559	8	46‍–‍31	39‍–‍36
New York Highlanders	70	78	.473	21	32‍–‍41	38‍–‍37
St. Louis Browns	69	83	.454	24	36‍–‍40	33‍–‍43
Boston Americans	59	90	.396	32½	34‍–‍41	25‍–‍49
Washington Senators	49	102	.325	43½	26‍–‍48	23‍–‍54

The team had six games end in a tie; June 21 vs. Chicago, July 22 at Chicago, September 9 vs. Philadelphia, September 13 at Philadelphia, September 30 vs. Chicago, and October 5 at New York. Tie games are not counted in league standings, but player statistics during tie games are counted.

=== Record vs. opponents ===
1907 American League record Sources:
Team	BOS	CWS	CLE	DET	NYH	PHA	SLB	WSH
Boston	—	10–11–3	8–13	6–16	8–12–1	8–14–2	10–12	9–12
Chicago	11–10–3	—	10–11–1	13–9–1	12–10	10–12–1	16–6	15–6
Cleveland	13–8	11–10–1	—	11–11–1	15–7	8–14	12–10–2	15–7–2
Detroit	16–6	9–13–1	11–11–1	—	13–8	11–8–1	14–8	18–4
New York	12–8–1	10–12	7–15	8–13	—	10–9–1	8–14–1	15–7–1
Philadelphia	14–8–2	12–10–1	14–8	8–11–1	9–10–1	—	14–6	17–4
St. Louis	12–10	6–16	10–12–2	8–14	14–8–1	6–14	—	13–9
Washington	12–9	6–15	7–15–2	4–18	7–15–1	4–17	9–13	—

=== Opening Day lineup ===
Denny Sullivan	CF
Jimmy Collins	3B
Bob Unglaub	1B
Jack Hoey	LF
Buck Freeman	RF
Hobe Ferris	2B
Heinie Wagner	SS
Lou Criger	C
Cy Young	P

=== Roster ===
1907 Boston Americans
Roster
Pitchers: Ed Barry; Fred Burchell; Bill Dinneen; Ralph Glaze; Joe Harris; Beany Jacobson; Rube Kroh; Cy Morgan; Frank Oberlin; Tex Pruiett; Elmer Steele; Jesse Tannehill; George Winter; Cy Young	Catchers: Charlie Armbruster; Lou Criger; Bob Peterson; Al Shaw; Infielders: Jimmy Collins; Hobe Ferris; John Knight; Harry Lord; Bob Unglaub; Heinie Wagner	Outfielders: Jimmy Barrett; Chet Chadbourne; Bunk Congalton; Buck Freeman; Myron Grimshaw; Jack Hoey; Freddy Parent; Tris Speaker; Denny Sullivan; George Whiteman; Other batters: Deacon McGuire	Managers: George Huff; Deacon McGuire; Bob Unglaub; Cy Young; Chick Stahl

==== Managerial records ====
Name	W–L	Pct.	Ref.
Chick Stahl	Spring training only		
Cy Young	3–3	.500	
George Huff	2–6	.250	
Bob Unglaub	9–20	.310	
Deacon McGuire	45–61	.425	
Total	59–90	.396	

== Player stats ==
=== Batting ===
==== Starters by position ====
Note: Pos = Position; G = Games played; AB = At bats; H = Hits; Avg. = Batting average; HR = Home runs; RBI = Runs batted in

Pos	Player	G	AB	H	Avg.	HR	RBI
C	Lou Criger	75	226	41	.181	0	14
1B	Bob Unglaub	139	544	138	.254	1	62
2B	Hobe Ferris	143	561	135	.241	4	60
SS	Heinie Wagner	111	385	82	.213	2	21
3B	John Knight	98	360	78	.217	2	29
OF	Denny Sullivan	144	551	135	.245	1	26
OF	Bunk Congalton	124	496	142	.286	2	47
OF	Jimmy Barrett	106	390	95	.244	1	28

==== Other batters ====
Note: G = Games played; AB = At bats; H = Hits; Avg. = Batting average; HR = Home runs; RBI = Runs batted in

Player	G	AB	H	Avg.	HR	RBI
Freddy Parent	114	409	113	.276	1	26
Al Shaw	76	198	38	.192	0	7
Myron Grimshaw	64	181	37	.204	0	33
Jimmy Collins	41	158	46	.291	0	10
Jack Hoey	39	96	21	.219	0	8
Charlie Armbruster	23	60	6	.100	0	0
Chet Chadbourne	10	38	11	.289	0	1
Harry Lord	10	38	6	.158	0	3
Tris Speaker	7	19	3	.158	0	1
Bob Peterson	4	13	1	.077	0	0
Buck Freeman	4	12	2	.167	1	2
George Whiteman	4	12	2	.167	0	1
Deacon McGuire	6	4	3	.750	1	1

=== Pitching ===
Note: G = Games pitched; IP = Innings pitched; W = Wins; L = Losses; ERA = Earned run average; SO = Strikeouts

==== Starting pitchers ====
Player	G	IP	W	L	ERA	SO
Cy Young	43	343 1/3	21	15	1.99	147
George Winter	35	256 2/3	12	15	2.07	88
Ralph Glaze	32	182 1/3	9	13	2.32	68
Jesse Tannehill	18	131	6	7	2.47	29
Cy Morgan	16	114 1/3	6	6	1.97	50
Rube Kroh	7	34 1/3	1	4	2.62	8
Bill Dinneen	5	32 2/3	0	4	5.23	8
Ed Barry	2	17 1/3	0	1	2.08	6

==== Other pitchers ====
Note: G = Games pitched; IP = Innings pitched; W = Wins; L = Losses; ERA = Earned run average; SO = Strikeouts

Player	G	IP	W	L	ERA	SO
Tex Pruiett	35	173 2/3	3	11	3.11	54
Joe Harris	12	59	0	7	3.05	24
Frank Oberlin	12	46	1	5	4.30	18
Elmer Steele	4	11 1/3	0	1	1.59	10
Fred Burchell	2	10	0	1	2.70	6
Beany Jacobson	2	2	0	0	9.00	1
