= 1907 New York Highlanders season =

Baseball team season

1907 New York Highlanders
- League: American League
- Ballpark: Hilltop Park
- City: New York, New York
- Record: 70–78 (.473)
- League place: 5th
- Owners: William Devery and Frank Farrell
- Managers: Clark Griffith

The 1907 New York Highlanders season, the team's fifth, finished with the team in fifth place in the American League with a record of 70–78. Another notable newcomer was New York's recently acquired left fielder Branch Rickey, who would become well known for integrating Jackie Robinson into the major leagues some four decades later.

== Regular season ==
=== Season standings ===
American League
Team	W	L	Pct.	GB	Home	Road
Detroit Tigers	92	58	.613	—	50‍–‍27	42‍–‍31
Philadelphia Athletics	88	57	.607	1½	50‍–‍20	38‍–‍37
Chicago White Sox	87	64	.576	5½	48‍–‍29	39‍–‍35
Cleveland Naps	85	67	.559	8	46‍–‍31	39‍–‍36
New York Highlanders	70	78	.473	21	32‍–‍41	38‍–‍37
St. Louis Browns	69	83	.454	24	36‍–‍40	33‍–‍43
Boston Americans	59	90	.396	32½	34‍–‍41	25‍–‍49
Washington Senators	49	102	.325	43½	26‍–‍48	23‍–‍54

=== Record vs. opponents ===
1907 American League record Sources:
Team	BOS	CWS	CLE	DET	NYH	PHA	SLB	WSH
Boston	—	10–11–3	8–13	6–16	8–12–1	8–14–2	10–12	9–12
Chicago	11–10–3	—	10–11–1	13–9–1	12–10	10–12–1	16–6	15–6
Cleveland	13–8	11–10–1	—	11–11–1	15–7	8–14	12–10–2	15–7–2
Detroit	16–6	9–13–1	11–11–1	—	13–8	11–8–1	14–8	18–4
New York	12–8–1	10–12	7–15	8–13	—	10–9–1	8–14–1	15–7–1
Philadelphia	14–8–2	12–10–1	14–8	8–11–1	9–10–1	—	14–6	17–4
St. Louis	12–10	6–16	10–12–2	8–14	14–8–1	6–14	—	13–9
Washington	12–9	6–15	7–15–2	4–18	7–15–1	4–17	9–13	—

=== Roster ===
1907 New York Highlanders
Roster
Pitchers: Cy Barger; King Brockett; Roy Castleton; Jack Chesbro; Walter Clarkson; Slow Joe Doyle; Clark Griffith; Bill Hogg; Tom Hughes; Bobby Keefe; Frank Kitson; Rube Manning; Earl Moore; Tacks Neuer; Doc Newton; Al Orth; Ray Tift	Catchers: Walter Blair; Red Kleinow; Deacon McGuire; Ira Thomas; Infielders: Neal Ball; Hal Chase; Kid Elberfeld; Frank LaPorte; Baldy Louden; George Moriarty; Jimmy Williams	Outfielders: Rudy Bell; Wid Conroy; Danny Hoffman; Willie Keeler; Branch Rickey	Manager: Clark Griffith

== Player stats ==
=== Batting ===
==== Starters by position ====
Note: Pos = Position; G = Games played; AB = At bats; H = Hits; Avg. = Batting average; HR = Home runs; RBI = Runs batted in

Pos	Player	G	AB	H	Avg.	HR	RBI
C	Red Kleinow	90	269	71	.264	0	26
1B	Hal Chase	125	498	143	.287	2	68
2B	Jimmy Williams	139	504	136	.270	2	63
SS	Kid Elberfeld	120	447	121	.271	0	51
3B	George Moriarty	126	437	121	.277	0	43
OF	Wid Conroy	140	530	124	.234	3	51
OF	Willie Keeler	107	423	99	.234	0	17
OF	Danny Hoffman	136	517	131	.253	5	46

==== Other batters ====
Note: G = Games played; AB = At bats; H = Hits; Avg. = Batting average; HR = Home runs; RBI = Runs batted in

Player	G	AB	H	Avg.	HR	RBI
Frank LaPorte	130	470	127	.270	0	48
Ira Thomas	80	208	40	.192	1	24
Branch Rickey	52	137	25	.182	0	15
Rudy Bell	17	52	11	.212	0	3
Neal Ball	15	44	9	.205	0	4
Walter Blair	7	22	4	.182	0	1
Baldy Louden	4	9	1	.111	0	0
Deacon McGuire	1	1	0	.000	0	0

=== Pitching ===
==== Starting pitchers ====
Note: G = Games pitched; IP = Innings pitched; W = Wins; L = Losses; ERA = Earned run average; SO = Strikeouts

Player	G	IP	W	L	ERA	SO
Al Orth	36	248.2	14	21	2.61	78
Jack Chesbro	30	206.0	10	10	2.53	78
Slow Joe Doyle	29	193.2	11	11	2.65	94
Bill Hogg	25	166.2	10	8	3.08	64
Doc Newton	19	133.0	7	10	3.18	70
Earl Moore	12	64.0	2	6	3.94	28
Tacks Neuer	7	54.0	4	2	2.17	22
Tom Hughes	4	27.0	2	0	2.67	10
Rube Manning	1	9.0	0	1	3.00	3

==== Other pitchers ====
Note: G = Games pitched; IP = Innings pitched; W = Wins; L = Losses; ERA = Earned run average; SO = Strikeouts

Player	G	IP	W	L	ERA	SO
Frank Kitson	12	61.0	4	0	3.10	14
King Brockett	8	46.1	1	2	6.22	13
Ray Tift	4	19.0	0	0	4.74	6
Walter Clarkson	5	17.1	1	1	6.23	3
Roy Castleton	3	16.0	1	1	2.81	3

==== Relief pitchers ====
Note: G = Games pitched; W = Wins; L = Losses; SV = Saves; ERA = Earned run average; SO = Strikeouts

Player	G	W	L	SV	ERA	SO
Bobby Keefe	19	3	5	3	2.50	20
Clark Griffith	4	0	0	0	8.64	5
Cy Barger	1	0	0	0	3.00	0
