= 1907 Cleveland Naps season =

1907 Cleveland Naps
- League: American League
- Ballpark: League Park
- City: Cleveland, Ohio
- Record: 85–67 (.559)
- League place: 5th
- Owners: Charles Somers
- Managers: Nap Lajoie

The 1907 Cleveland Naps season was a season in American baseball. The team finished fourth in the American League with a record of 85–67, 8 games behind the Detroit Tigers.

== Offseason ==
In March 1907, Detroit Tigers manager Hughie Jennings offered Ty Cobb to the Cleveland Naps in exchange for Elmer Flick. The Naps refused the deal. Cobb went on to win the first of nine consecutive batting titles, and the Tigers won the AL pennant.

== Regular season ==
=== Season standings ===
American League
Team	W	L	Pct.	GB	Home	Road
Detroit Tigers	92	58	.613	—	50‍–‍27	42‍–‍31
Philadelphia Athletics	88	57	.607	1½	50‍–‍20	38‍–‍37
Chicago White Sox	87	64	.576	5½	48‍–‍29	39‍–‍35
Cleveland Naps	85	67	.559	8	46‍–‍31	39‍–‍36
New York Highlanders	70	78	.473	21	32‍–‍41	38‍–‍37
St. Louis Browns	69	83	.454	24	36‍–‍40	33‍–‍43
Boston Americans	59	90	.396	32½	34‍–‍41	25‍–‍49
Washington Senators	49	102	.325	43½	26‍–‍48	23‍–‍54

=== Record vs. opponents ===
1907 American League record Sources:
Team	BOS	CWS	CLE	DET	NYH	PHA	SLB	WSH
Boston	—	10–11–3	8–13	6–16	8–12–1	8–14–2	10–12	9–12
Chicago	11–10–3	—	10–11–1	13–9–1	12–10	10–12–1	16–6	15–6
Cleveland	13–8	11–10–1	—	11–11–1	15–7	8–14	12–10–2	15–7–2
Detroit	16–6	9–13–1	11–11–1	—	13–8	11–8–1	14–8	18–4
New York	12–8–1	10–12	7–15	8–13	—	10–9–1	8–14–1	15–7–1
Philadelphia	14–8–2	12–10–1	14–8	8–11–1	9–10–1	—	14–6	17–4
St. Louis	12–10	6–16	10–12–2	8–14	14–8–1	6–14	—	13–9
Washington	12–9	6–15	7–15–2	4–18	7–15–1	4–17	9–13	—

=== Roster ===
1907 Cleveland Naps
Roster
Pitchers: Heinie Berger; Bill Bernhard; Walter Clarkson; Otto Hess; Addie Joss; Glenn Liebhardt; Earl Moore; Bob Rhoads; Jake Thielman	Catchers: Harry Bemis; Nig Clarke; Howard Wakefield; Infielders: Bill Bradley; Harry Hinchman; Nap Lajoie; Pete Lister; Rabbit Nill; Pete O'Brien; George Stovall; Terry Turner	Outfielders: Harry Bay; Joe Birmingham; Bunk Congalton; Frank Delahanty; Elmer Flick; Bill Hinchman	Manager: Nap Lajoie

== Player stats ==
=== Batting ===
==== Starters by position ====
Note: Pos = Position; G = Games played; AB = At bats; H = Hits; Avg. = Batting average; HR = Home runs; RBI = Runs batted in

Pos	Player	G	AB	H	Avg.	HR	RBI
C	Nig Clarke	120	390	105	.269	3	33
1B	George Stovall	124	466	110	.236	1	36
2B	Nap Lajoie	137	509	152	.299	2	63
3B	Bill Bradley	139	498	111	.223	0	34
SS	Terry Turner	140	524	127	.242	0	46
OF	Elmer Flick	147	549	166	.302	3	58
OF	Bill Hinchman	152	514	117	.228	1	50
OF	Joe Birmingham	137	476	112	.235	1	33

==== Other batters ====
Note: G = Games played; AB = At bats; H = Hits; Avg. = Batting average; HR = Home runs; RBI = Runs batted in

Player	G	AB	H	Avg.	HR	RBI
Harry Bemis	65	172	43	.250	0	19
Pete O'Brien	43	145	33	.228	0	6
Harry Bay	34	95	17	.179	0	7
Pete Lister	22	65	18	.277	0	4
Frank Delahanty	15	52	9	.173	0	4
Harry Hinchman	15	51	11	.216	0	9
Rabbit Nill	12	43	12	.279	0	2
Howard Wakefield	26	37	5	.135	0	3
Bunk Congalton	9	22	4	.182	0	2

=== Pitching ===
==== Starting pitchers ====
Note: G = Games pitched; IP = Innings pitched; W = Wins; L = Losses; ERA = Earned run average; SO = Strikeouts

Player	G	IP	W	L	ERA	SO
Addie Joss	42	338.2	27	11	1.83	127
Glenn Liebhardt	38	280.1	18	14	2.05	110
Bob Rhoads	35	275.0	15	14	2.29	76
Jake Thielman	20	166.0	11	8	2.33	56
Otto Hess	17	93.1	6	6	2.89	36

==== Other pitchers ====
Note: G = Games pitched; IP = Innings pitched; W = Wins; L = Losses; ERA = Earned run average; SO = Strikeouts

Player	G	IP	W	L	ERA	SO
Walter Clarkson	17	90.2	4	6	1.99	32
Heinie Berger	14	87.1	3	3	2.99	50
Bill Bernhard	8	42.0	0	4	3.21	19
Earl Moore	3	19.1	1	1	4.66	7
