= 1907 Washington Senators season =

1907 Washington Senators
- League: American League
- Ballpark: National Park
- City: Washington, D.C.
- Record: 49–102 (.325)
- League place: 8th
- Owners: Thomas C. Noyes
- Managers: Joe Cantillon

The 1907 Washington Senators won 49 games, lost 102, and finished in eighth place in the American League. They were managed by Joe Cantillon and played home games at National Park.

== Regular season ==
=== Season standings ===
American League
Team	W	L	Pct.	GB	Home	Road
Detroit Tigers	92	58	.613	—	50‍–‍27	42‍–‍31
Philadelphia Athletics	88	57	.607	1½	50‍–‍20	38‍–‍37
Chicago White Sox	87	64	.576	5½	48‍–‍29	39‍–‍35
Cleveland Naps	85	67	.559	8	46‍–‍31	39‍–‍36
New York Highlanders	70	78	.473	21	32‍–‍41	38‍–‍37
St. Louis Browns	69	83	.454	24	36‍–‍40	33‍–‍43
Boston Americans	59	90	.396	32½	34‍–‍41	25‍–‍49
Washington Senators	49	102	.325	43½	26‍–‍48	23‍–‍54

=== Record vs. opponents ===
1907 American League record Sources:
Team	BOS	CWS	CLE	DET	NYH	PHA	SLB	WSH
Boston	—	10–11–3	8–13	6–16	8–12–1	8–14–2	10–12	9–12
Chicago	11–10–3	—	10–11–1	13–9–1	12–10	10–12–1	16–6	15–6
Cleveland	13–8	11–10–1	—	11–11–1	15–7	8–14	12–10–2	15–7–2
Detroit	16–6	9–13–1	11–11–1	—	13–8	11–8–1	14–8	18–4
New York	12–8–1	10–12	7–15	8–13	—	10–9–1	8–14–1	15–7–1
Philadelphia	14–8–2	12–10–1	14–8	8–11–1	9–10–1	—	14–6	17–4
St. Louis	12–10	6–16	10–12–2	8–14	14–8–1	6–14	—	13–9
Washington	12–9	6–15	7–15–2	4–18	7–15–1	4–17	9–13	—

=== Roster ===
1907 Washington Senators
Roster
Pitchers: Bull Durham; Sam Edmonston; Cy Falkenberg; Hank Gehring; Oscar Graham; Tom Hughes; Walter Johnson; Frank Kitson; Sam Lanford; John McDonald; Frank Oberlin; Casey Patten; Charlie Smith; Doc Tonkin	Catchers: Cliff Blankenship; Bruno Block; Mike Heydon; Mike Kahoe; Owen Shannon; Jack Warner; Infielders: Dave Altizer; John Anderson; Lave Cross; Jim Delahanty; Charlie Hickman; Rabbit Nill; Pete O'Brien; Nig Perrine; Larry Schlafly; Bill Shipke; Tony Smith	Outfielders: Otis Clymer; Bob Ganley; Charlie Jones; Bill Kay; Clyde Milan	Manager: Joe Cantillon

== Player stats ==
=== Batting ===
==== Starters by position ====
Note: Pos = Position; G = Games played; AB = At bats; H = Hits; Avg. = Batting average; HR = Home runs; RBI = Runs batted in

Pos	Player	G	AB	H	Avg.	HR	RBI
C	Jack Warner	72	207	53	.256	0	17
1B	John Anderson	87	333	96	.288	0	44
2B	Jim Delahanty	108	404	118	.292	2	54
SS	Dave Altizer	147	540	145	.269	2	42
3B	Bill Shipke	64	189	37	.196	1	9
OF	Charlie Jones	121	437	116	.265	0	37
OF	Bob Ganley	154	605	167	.276	1	35
OF	Otis Clymer	57	206	65	.316	1	16

==== Other batters ====
Note: G = Games played; AB = At bats; H = Hits; Avg. = Batting average; HR = Home runs; RBI = Runs batted in

Player	G	AB	H	Avg.	HR	RBI
Rabbit Nill	66	215	47	.219	0	25
Charlie Hickman	60	198	55	.278	1	23
Clyde Milan	48	183	51	.279	0	9
Mike Heydon	62	164	30	.183	0	9
Lave Cross	41	161	32	.199	0	10
Nig Perrine	44	146	25	.171	0	15
Tony Smith	51	139	26	.187	0	8
Pete O'Brien	39	134	25	.187	0	12
Cliff Blankenship	37	102	23	.225	0	6
Larry Schlafly	24	74	10	.135	1	4
Bill Kay	25	60	20	.333	0	7
Bruno Block	24	57	8	.140	0	2
Mike Kahoe	17	47	9	.191	0	1
Owen Shannon	4	7	1	.143	0	0

=== Pitching ===
==== Starting pitchers ====
Note: G = Games pitched; IP = Innings pitched; W = Wins; L = Losses; ERA = Earned run average; SO = Strikeouts

Player	G	IP	W	L	ERA	SO
Charlie Smith	36	258.2	10	20	2.61	119
Casey Patten	36	237.1	12	16	3.56	58
Cy Falkenberg	32	233.2	6	17	2.35	108
Walter Johnson	14	110.1	5	9	1.88	71

==== Other pitchers ====
Note: G = Games pitched; IP = Innings pitched; W = Wins; L = Losses; ERA = Earned run average; SO = Strikeouts

Player	G	IP	W	L	ERA	SO
Tom Hughes	34	211.0	7	14	3.11	102
Oscar Graham	20	104.0	4	9	3.98	44
Hank Gehring	15	87.0	3	7	3.31	31
Frank Oberlin	11	48.2	2	6	4.62	18
Frank Kitson	5	32.0	0	3	3.94	11
Sam Lanford	2	7.0	0	1	5.14	2

==== Relief pitchers ====
Note: G = Games pitched; W = Wins; L = Losses; SV = Saves; ERA = Earned run average; SO = Strikeouts

Player	G	W	L	SV	ERA	SO
Bull Durham	2	0	0	0	12.60	1
John McDonald	1	0	0	0	9.00	3
Charlie Hickman	1	0	0	0	3.60	2
Sam Edmonston	1	0	0	0	9.00	0
Doc Tonkin	1	0	0	0	6.75	0
