= Fred Burchell =

Fred Burchell may refer to:

- Fred Burchell (baseball) (1879–1951), American MLB baseball player
- Fred Burchell (ice hockey) (1931–1998), Canadian NHL ice hockey player
