= George Huff (coach) =

American athlete, coach, and administrator (1872–1936)

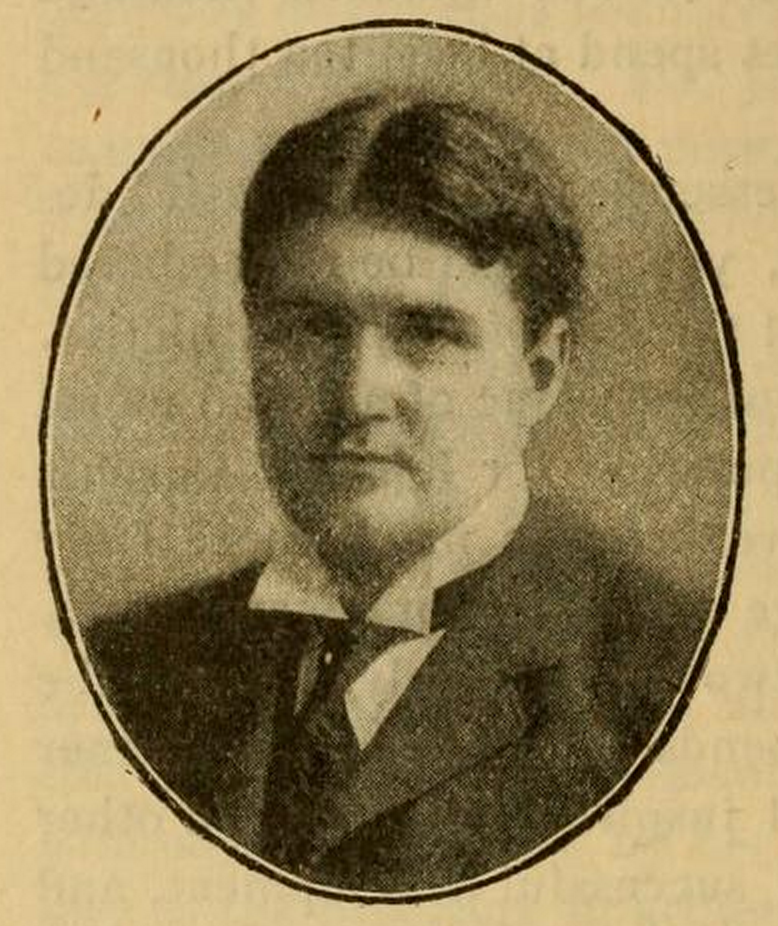
- Huff pictured in The Official National Collegiate Athletic Association football guide, 1899

Biographical details
- Born: June 11, 1872; Champaign, Illinois, U.S.
- Died: October 1, 1936 (aged 64); Champaign, Illinois, U.S.

Playing career

Football
- 1890, 1892: Illinois
- 1893–1894: Dartmouth

Baseball
- 1889–1891: Illinois
- 1893: Illinois
- 1894: Dartmouth
- Position: Guard (football)

Coaching career (HC unless noted)

Football
- 1895–1899: Illinois

Baseball
- 1896–1919: Illinois
- 1907: Boston Americans

Administrative career (AD unless noted)
- 1901–1936: Illinois

Head coaching record
- Overall: 21–16–3 (football); 317–97–4 (college baseball); 2–6 (MLB)

Accomplishments and honors

Championships
- Baseball; 11 Big Ten (1900, 1903–1904, 1906–1908, 1910–1911, 1914–1916)

George A. Huff Jr. (June 11, 1872 – October 1, 1936) was an American football and baseball player, coach, and college athletics administrator. Huff served as the head football coach at the University of Illinois at Urbana–Champaign from 1895 to 1899, compiling a record of 21–16–3. He was also the head baseball coach at Illinois from 1896 to 1919, tallying a mark of 317–97–4, and the athletic director at Illinois from 1901 to 1935. Huff Hall at the University of Illinois in Champaign is named in his honor.

Huff was briefly a manager for the Boston Americans at the start of the 1907 Major League Baseball season following the sudden suicide of Chick Stahl. Cy Young started out as the player/manager, but after six games stepped down in favor of Huff. Huff managed only eight games, finishing with a career 2–6 managerial record, before resigning on May 1, 1907, to return to his old job. Bob Unglaub replaced him. The Americans had a total of four managers in the 1907 season. The team was renamed as the Boston Red Sox the following season.

== Head coaching record ==
=== Football ===
Year	Team	Overall	Conference	Standing	Bowl/playoffs
Illinois Fighting Illini (Illinois Intercollegiate Football League) (1895)
1895	Illinois	4–2–1			
Illinois Fighting Illini (Western Conference) (1896–1899)
1896	Illinois	4–2–1	0–2–1	T–6th	
1897	Illinois	6–2	1–1	4th	
1898	Illinois	4–5	1–1	4th	
1899	Illinois	3–5–1	0–3	T–6th	
Illinois:		21–16–3			
Total:		21–16–3			

== Managerial record ==
Team	Year	Regular season					Postseason			
Team	Year	Games	Won	Lost	Win %	Finish	Won	Lost	Win %	Result
BOA	1907	8	2	6	.250	resigned	–	–	–	–
Total		8	2	6	.250		0	0	–	
