= The Baseball Bug =

1911 silent comedy film

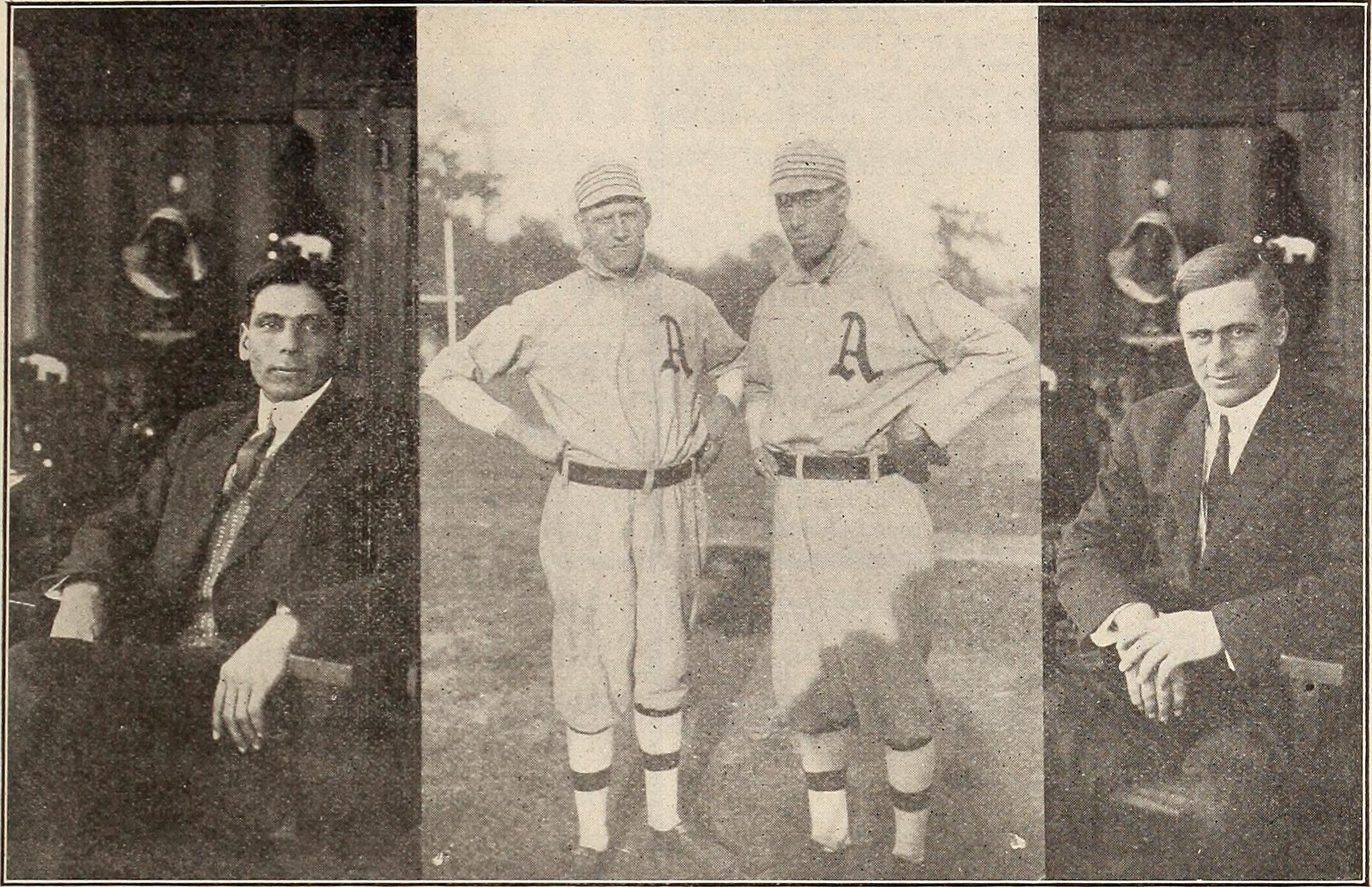
- Produced by: Edwin Thanhouser
- Starring: John W. Noble; Florence La Badie
- Production company: Thanhouser Company
- Distributed by: Motion Picture Distributing and Sales Company
- Release date: November 24, 1911
- Running time: 1 reel
- Country: USA
- Language: Silent with English intertitles

The Baseball Bug is a 1911 American silent short comedy film produced by the Thanhouser Company. It starred John W. Noble and Florence La Badie. It also featured real-life baseball players Chief Bender Jack Coombs, Cy Morgan, and Rube Oldring.

== Plot ==
According to a magazine, "A young clerk in a small town, through success on the local amateur team, became convinced he was superior to the big-leaguers. He neglected his work and thought of nothing but baseball, which worried his wife, who finally appealed to a distant relative, Chief Bender, noted twirler of the World's Champions, to help her, and not in vain, for to the conceited counter jumper came a letter stating that his fame had reached Connie Mack, and Bender, Coombs, Morgan and “Rube’’ Oldring were coming to learn from the village champion how to play baseball. By this time the little frog had swollen to such a size that he really believed the plea was genuine. But there was only one lesson, and the little frog went sadly home, burned his uniform, bats and baseballs and returned to his regular work behind the counter—cured."

== Cast ==
- John W. Noble - The Would-Be Baseball Star
- Florence La Badie - The Would-Be Baseball Star's Wife
- Charles Albert Bender - as himself, Philadelphia Athletics player (as Big Chief Bender)
- Jack Coombs - as himself, Philadelphia Athletics player
- Cy Morgan - as himself, Philadelphia Athletics player
- Rube Oldring - as himself, Philadelphia Athletics player
