= Pete Lister =

American baseball player (1881-1947)

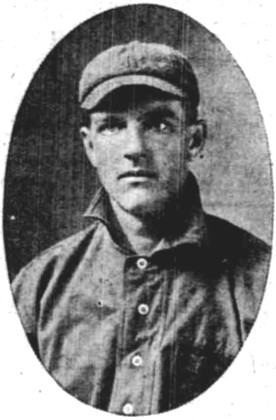
- First baseman
- Born: July 21, 1881; Savanna, Illinois, U.S.
- Died: March 27, 1947 (aged 65); St. Petersburg, Florida, U.S.
- Batted: Right Threw: Right

MLB debut
- September 14, 1907, for the Cleveland Naps

Last MLB appearance
- October 7, 1907, for the Cleveland Naps

MLB statistics
- Batting average: .277
- Home runs: 0
- Runs batted in: 4
- Stats at Baseball Reference

Teams
- Cleveland Naps (1907)

Morris Elmer Lister (July 21, 1881 – March 27, 1947) was an American Major League Baseball first baseman who played in 22 games for the Cleveland Naps during the 1907 season.
