= Tacks Neuer =

American baseball player

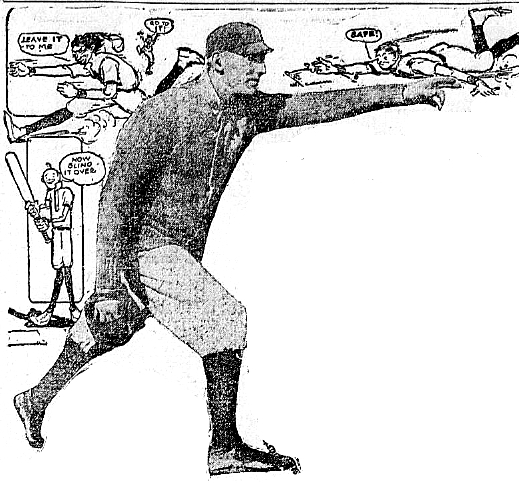
- Pitcher
- Born: June 8, 1877; Fremont, Ohio, U.S.
- Died: January 14, 1966 (aged 88); Northumberland, Pennsylvania, U.S.
- Batted: Left Threw: Left

MLB debut
- August 28, 1907, for the New York Highlanders

Last MLB appearance
- October 3, 1907, for the New York Highlanders

MLB statistics
- Win–loss record: 4–2
- Earned run average: 2.17
- Strikeouts: 22
- Stats at Baseball Reference

Teams
- New York Highlanders (1907)

John Stein "Tacks" Neuer (June 8, 1877 – January 14, 1966) was an American Major League Baseball pitcher who played for the New York Highlanders in 1907. In seven career games, he had a 4–2 record, with a 2.17 earned run average (ERA) and 22 strikeouts.

A veteran of the Spanish–American War, Neuer worked as a brakeman before taking up baseball professionally. He played for various minor league teams in 1905 and 1907 before making his debut for the New York Highlanders. With New York, he threw three shutouts in seven games, and was praised by manager Clark Griffith for his pitching ability during that stretch. However, his control deteriorated after that season, and over the next three years he played for various minor league teams. He retired after 1910 and became an umpire. He then worked at Bendix Aviation until his retirement in 1942.

== Early life and career ==
Neuer was born in Fremont, Ohio, and was one of eight children born to Henry Neuer and Jennie Catherman. He and his family moved to Sunbury, Pennsylvania, when he was a child. In 1898, Neuer enlisted in the Spanish–American War as a private, and was discharged the following year. After his discharge, he worked as a brakeman for a local railroad for the next few years. In late 1904, the Detroit Tigers intended to sign Neuer to a contract. However, nothing came of it and he never played a game with the organization.

Six months after the rumored signing, Neuer was signed by the Wilkes-Barre Barons of the New York State League. He made his professional debut on July 27, 1905, and threw a one-hit shutout against the Syracuse Stars. He pitched for Wilkes-Barre the rest of the season. In his final game for them, he pitched both games of a doubleheader, winning one and losing the other. In 1906, Wilkes-Barre planned to re-sign Neuer, praising his hitting ability to the point that they were considering trying him out as an outfielder or first baseman. They were unable to agree on a contract, and as a result he sat out the 1906 season.

In December 1906, the Philadelphia Phillies signed Neuer to a contract. He played with the Phillies through the spring, but was cut before the season started and sent to the Providence Grays of the Eastern League. He debuted for them in May, and after being on the team for five days was sent back to Philadelphia. The Phillies stated that they released him outright to Providence; the issue led to a dispute on which club should pay him for that month, which was settled the following year. After the dispute, Neuer was assigned to the Savannah Indians of the South Atlantic League. He played with the team for three months, and threw multiple shutouts for the team. As a result, New York Highlanders manager Clark Griffith purchased Neuer on August 23 "for immediate delivery."

== New York Highlanders ==
Neuer made his debut for New York on August 28, 1907, against the Boston Americans. He pitched a shutout and earned a 1–0 victory in which he showed "excellent speed and control." A week later, he again faced the Americans, and while his pitching was not as "unsolvable" as in his debut, the Highlanders again won, 10–5. His next appearance was against the Washington Senators on September 9. In that game, he allowed two hits and threw his second shutout of the season. A rematch against Washington five days later resulted in a 10–2 loss that "came as a great shock" due to his victory earlier in the month.

On September 21, Neuer made an appearance as a relief pitcher in a game against the Detroit Tigers, taking over for Bill Hogg due to the latter's ineffectiveness. His next appearance as a starter was against the St. Louis Browns. He was unable to control the baseball due to rain; the 5–2 game was called after six innings as a result, giving Neuer his second loss. His final appearance of the season was on October 3 against the Chicago White Sox. In that game, he allowed three hits in an 8–0 victory for his third and final shutout of the season. Neuer spent the offseason working as a hotel clerk, and after signing a contract for the 1908 season, he joined the team for spring training.

Griffith continued to have faith in Neuer during the exhibition season, and said he could potentially be "one of the greatest ever in the twirling line." Instead of working on his control during that time, which was considered the main thing he needed to work on, he practiced throwing the knuckleball and spitball. Griffith encouraged him to do so, believing that developing these trick pitches would allow him to become a great pitcher, and as a result, he practiced these pitches until, according to one sportswriter, "he was so wild he couldn’t hit the grand stand." In one exhibition game against Atlanta, he appeared in relief of Jack Chesbro, and allowed four runs in less than an inning due to his lack of control. His pitching continued to get worse, and by the end of spring training he was sent to the Newark Indians of the Eastern League. He never returned to the major leagues, becoming the only person to throw a shutout in both his major league debut and his final game.

== Later life ==
In Neuer's debut for Newark, he allowed nine walks, eight runs, and made two errors; his pitching was noted as the direct cause of the 8–5 loss. By the beginning of June, Newark returned him to New York; in his short time in the Eastern League, Neuer set the record for most strikeouts in a game and most walks in a game, with 13 each. Griffith sent him back to Newark almost immediately, and they in turn sent him to the Toronto Maple Leafs, who in turn released him. He then signed with the Little Rock Travelers of the Southern Association, and pitched for them before being released on August 1.

The Chicago Cubs decided to give Neuer a tryout, hoping to add some pitching depth to help them, as they were in a pennant race. He did not make the roster, and was sent to the Johnstown Johnnies of the Tri-State League, where he finished the 1908 season. In 1909, he was increasingly referred to with the nickname of "Tacks", a nickname reserved for "restless, uneasy, erratic athletes", due to both his lack of control and his general inconsistency on the mound. That season, he played with many teams, both professional and semi-pro, and was frequently released to his inability to control the ball. The following year, he attempted one more comeback with the Binghamton Bingoes of the New York State League. Manager Jack Warner found his control to be so bad that he refused to use him in a regular season game, and Neuer's release from Binghamton marked the end of his professional career.

After retiring from baseball, Neuer became an umpire for local semi-pro and amateur baseball games, and worked for Bendix Aviation Corporation in Greene, New York until retiring in 1942. As an umpire, he was known for his entertaining style, adding extra emphasis on his calls to amuse game attendees. Neuer was married twice and had one son, Eugene, from his first marriage. He moved to Northumberland, Pennsylvania in the 1940s, where he lived until his death in 1966.
