= Doc Tonkin =

American baseball player (1881-1959)

- Pitcher
- Born: August 11, 1881; Concord, New Hampshire, U.S.
- Died: May 30, 1959 (aged 77); Miami, Florida, U.S.
- Batted: Left Threw: Left

MLB debut
- August 19, 1907, for the Washington Senators

Last MLB appearance
- May 30, 1907, for the Washington Senators

MLB statistics
- Games: 1
- Win–loss record: 0–0
- Earned run average: 6.75
- Stats at Baseball Reference

Teams
- Washington Senators (1907)

Harry Glenville "Doc" Tonkin (August 11, 1881 – May 30, 1959) was an American physician and professional baseball player, who appeared in one major-league game, for the 1907 Washington Senators.

== Biography ==
Tonkin was born in 1881 in Concord, New Hampshire. He played baseball professionally from 1905 to 1907, for three different teams in Minor League Baseball, for which statistical detail is lacking. He played in one major-league game, for the Washington Senators on May 30, 1907. He pitched 2 2/3 innings, and gave up six hits and two earned runs. He also collected two hits in two at bats, for a rare 1.000 batting average.

Tonkin attended Baltimore Medical College, which was later absorbed into the University of Maryland. He operated a medical practice in Martinsburg, West Virginia, where he served three terms as mayor. During World War I, he served briefly as a captain in the United States Army Medical Corps. Tonkin died in 1959 in Miami, Florida.
