= Bob Unglaub =

American baseball player and manager (1880–1916)

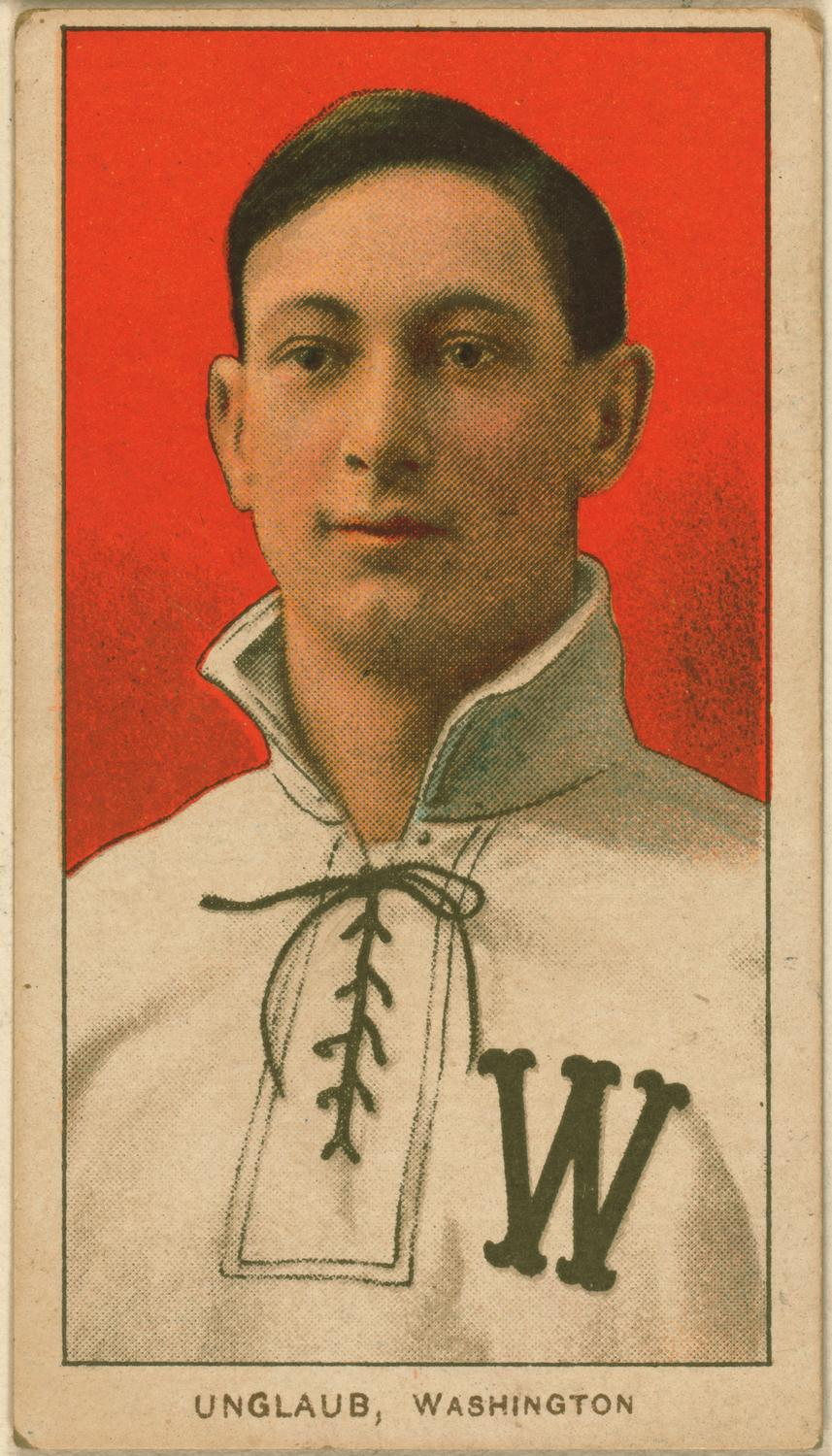
- First baseman / Utility infielder / Manager
- Born: July 31, 1880; Baltimore, Maryland, U.S.
- Died: November 29, 1916 (aged 36); Baltimore, Maryland, U.S.
- Batted: Right Threw: Right

MLB debut
- April 15, 1904, for the New York Highlanders

Last MLB appearance
- September 17, 1910, for the Washington Senators

MLB statistics
- Batting average: .258
- Home runs: 5
- Runs batted in: 216
- Managerial record: 9–20
- Winning %: .310
- Stats at Baseball Reference

Teams
- As player: New York Highlanders (1904); Boston Americans/Red Sox (1904–1905, 1907–1908); Washington Senators (1908–1910); As manager: Boston Americans (1907)

Robert Alexander Unglaub (July 31, 1880 – November 29, 1916) was an American first baseman, utility infielder and manager in Major League Baseball who played for the New York Highlanders, Boston Americans, and Washington Senators. He batted and threw right-handed. Unglaub stood 5 feet 11 inches (1.80 m) and weighed 178 pounds (81 kg).

A Baltimore native, Unglaub was first exposed to baseball when he served as batboy and mascot for the Baltimore Orioles. He made his major league debut with the Highlanders in 1904 and was traded to Boston later that year. Though he started at first base for Boston in late 1905, he played minor league baseball in 1906 because of a salary dispute. Back with the Americans in 1907, he became their full-time first baseman and even their manager, though the latter role lasted for only 29 games. He was traded to Washington in 1908 and remained with the Senators through the 1910 season. Unglaub then played in the minor leagues for six more years before he was killed in an accident while working at Baltimore's Pennsylvania Railroad shops.

== Early life ==
Born in Baltimore, Maryland, on July 31, 1881, Unglaub was the son of John and Minnie Unglaub. He grew up a mere three blocks away from Union Park, home of the Baltimore Orioles. In his formative years, he served as batboy and mascot for the ballclub, receiving baseball tips and advice from players such as John McGraw, Joe Kelley, Willie Keeler, and Steve Brodie. Unglaub would often catch fly balls hit by the players during batting practice.

Upon Unglaub's graduation from high school in 1897, a representative of the University of Maryland inquired about Unglaub's interest in attending the institution. Unglaub said he wanted to play baseball, then discovered he could do both; the school would pay him $75 a month to play baseball for the Terrapins. Accepting the offer, Unglaub attended the school for three years, pitching under his middle name of Alexander and acquiring an engineering degree. During his time in college, Unglaub also played for a variety of amateur and semipro teams on Maryland's Eastern Shore.

== Baseball career ==
=== Early seasons (1900–03) ===
Early in 1900 Unglaub signed with the minor league Meriden Silverites, who played as members of the Connecticut State League. He made his debut for Meriden on May 9, 1900, in a 5-4 loss to Bristol Bellmakers. Unglaub went on to appear in 92 games with the Meriden baseball club during 1900 season playing third base and catcher getting 117 hits in 365 at bats and batting .321. Following a good performance in Meriden's 14-6 win against Waterbury in their last home game on September 7, Unglaub was sold to Worcester Farmers of the Eastern League. Unglaub immediately started for Worcester in their 4-2 win against Syracuse on September 10 and stayed on to appear in remaining 12 games with Worcester during the 1900 season. He played an entire 1901 season with Worcester, serving as a third baseman and batting .247.

Following his first full successful season in the Eastern League, Unglaub attracted attention of several other clubs. While he verbally agreed to stay with Worcester for another year and received approximately $50 in advance money from the club's president, he went on trial with Philadelphia Phillies and signed a contract with them in January 1902. Unglaub initially denied signing the contract with another club, but the truth eventually came out and his contract with Philadelphia was nullified. Refusing to return to Worcester, Unglaub crossed the country to join the Sacramento Senators of the independent California State League for the upcoming 1902 season. He made his debut for the Senators on April 5, 1902, in their 6-5 away loss to San Francisco Ponies. Unglaub started the season as a second baseman, but was quickly shifted to shortstop, finishing the season as a first baseman and right infielder. He played his last game for Sacramento on December 7, 1902, in their 4-2 win against San Francisco, finishing the season with .260 batting and appearing in 150 games for the Senators.

He joined the Milwaukee Brewers of the American Association in 1903 and batted .304, moving back to third base during the year.

=== First taste of the major leagues (1904–05) ===
In 1904, Unglaub reached the major leagues for the first time, debuting with the New York Highlanders. Though initially signed by the Boston Americans, his rights were transferred to New York in an unknown transaction before the season started. (Note: A contemporary news account from the Boston American fails to mention exactly what sort of transaction it was.) Unglaub made his major league debut on April 15, pinch-hitting and taking over at shortstop in a 4–1 loss to Boston. He started four straight games at third base from May 3 through 6 before being sidelined due to blood poisoning. Still not having played since May 6, he was sent back to the Americans in late July as a player to be named later from an earlier trade for Patsy Dougherty. In Boston, he was used sparingly, appearing in nine games for the rest of the year. The only two he played to completion were doubleheaders.

On July 4, 1905, Unglaub played all 20 innings at first base in a pitching duel between Cy Young of the Americans and Rube Waddell of the Philadelphia Athletics. He successfully fielded all 32 chances with no errors, though Boston lost 4–2. Much of his playing time came at the end of the year, when he replaced player-manager Jimmy Collins at third base in the second game of a doubleheader against the St. Louis Browns on September 22, then served as the starting third baseman for the rest of the season, batting .288 with 13 runs scored and six runs batted in (RBI) in the season's final 16 games. In 43 games, he batted .223 with 18 runs scored, 27 hits, and 11 RBI.

=== Salary dispute (1906–07) ===
Unglaub would not continue to start at third base for the Americans in 1906. Under baseball's National Agreement of 1883, players were supposed to make more money in the major leagues than in the minors. Unglaub claimed that he had been paid $2,000 in 1903 by the Brewers but that his salary had stayed the same since he reached the major leagues. In March 1906, Unglaub wrote a letter to August Herrmann, president of the National Commission, asking for his help in the matter; he also sent an open letter to Sporting Life in April detailing his grievances. Though Herrman thought he was entitled to a raise, American League (AL) president Ban Johnson and fellow Commission member Henry Pulliam disagreed, preventing the Commission from interfering with the dispute.

Finding no sympathy from the Commission, Unglaub turned his back on the major leagues and signed with the Williamsport Millionaires of the Tri-State League, which was not affiliated with organized baseball. His salary in 1906 is unknown, but in 1907, the team offered him $4,500. Unglaub was unable to take advantage of the offer, however, because the league became affiliated with organized baseball again in 1907, and his contract was transferred back to Boston. He was fined $200 for skipping the 1906 season, and Unglaub vented his frustrations in an angry letter to the Americans: "So far as I can see it is a case of pure blackmail to extort money from a man to let him make a living for himself & family and so far as I am concerned there will be no fine paid."

=== Everyday player and manager (1907–08) ===
Back in Boston, Unglaub became the Americans' everyday first baseman. The Red Sox were struggling to find a manager, as Chick Stahl, who previously served in that capacity, committed suicide during spring training. Cy Young filled the role for six games before resigning; his replacement, George Huff, lasted eight before doing the same. Then, team owner John I. Taylor picked Unglaub to take over the role. As Unglaub later recalled:

After I was appointed the team went mad, raving mad, for some reason, winning four out of the first five games. The winning was done entirely by bunting. We didn’t swing at the ball once an inning. We bunted to get on and bunted the happy ones all the way home. It was a great system all right. And the newspapers spent columns talking about our tapping. I was naturally puffed up like a toy balloon and dreamed of teasing our way to a pennant. Then, just to show what fans are made of when they get thinking too much, I began to get letters asking me why, if I had taught the team to bunt, I could not teach the men to drive the ball smartly on a straight line, over the heads of the infielders, when said infielders were playing in! What do you think of that! They were handing me a roast because I did not make the players turn off straight singles in these days when .300 hitters are so scarce you can count them on one hand!

The team went 9–20 (.310) before Unglaub was replaced as manager by Deacon McGuire; however, Unglaub still served as team captain. He struggled to field his position and became a constant source of criticism from the fans, who would boo him during games. "Wanted-A good first baseman, who can handle fast balls, occasionally stop bounders, who won’t confuse base ball with bowling, and who won’t draw back when at bat," one reporter wrote. In 139 games, Unglaub batted .254 with 49 runs scored, 138 hits, one home run, and 62 RBI. He continued to hold the first base position for Boston until July, when he was traded to the Washington Senators. Unglaub did not immediately report to his new team, claiming that they had failed to communicate with him and threatening to join the independent Stockton Millers unless he was guaranteed the same salary he had made in Boston. Joe Cantillon, the Senators' manager, said the team had been unable to contact Unglaub but that they would pay the same salary, and Unglaub soon reported. A week after his last game with Boston, he was playing for the Senators.

=== Washington Senators (1908–10) ===
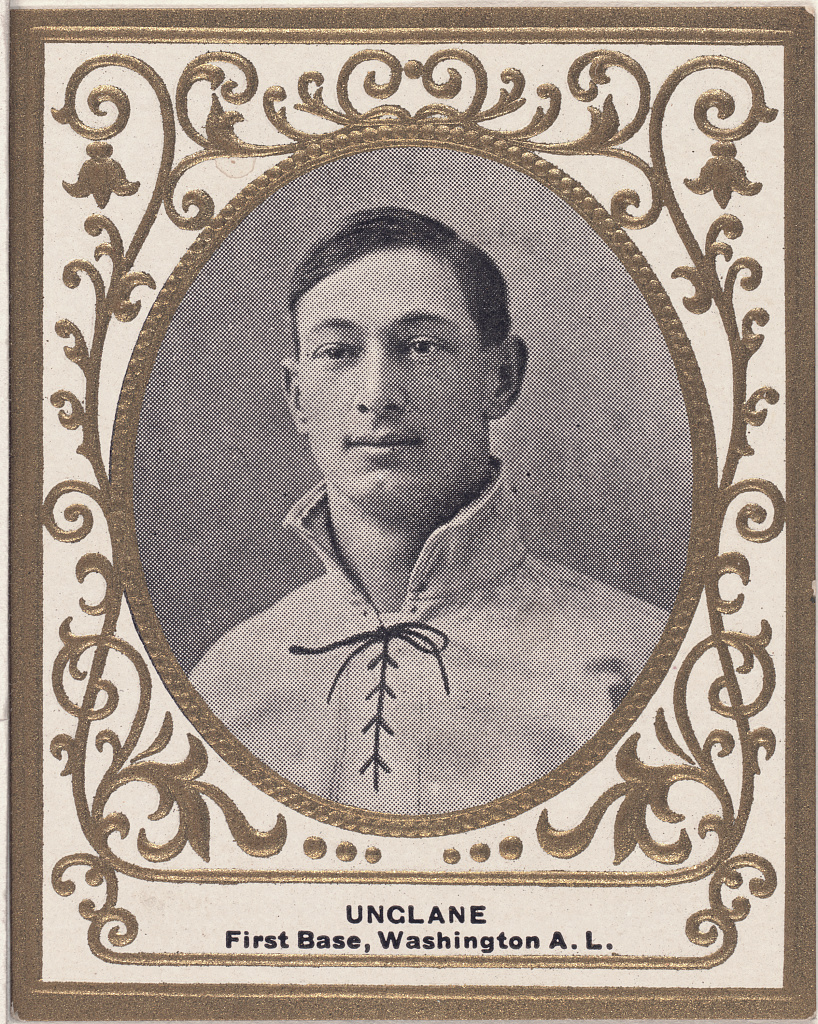
1900s card of Unglaub with the Senators, mistakenly spelling his name as "Unglane"

Unglaub's move to Washington "revived his career," according to baseball historian Frank Russo. He was used mostly at second and third base but still found himself in the lineup every day. He had batted .263 in 72 games with Boston, but Unglaub upped his average to .308 with the Senators. In 144 games (his career high) between the two clubs, he batted .286 with 46 runs scored, 155 hits, one home run, and 54 RBI.

Before the 1909 season, Unglaub expressed satisfaction with his situation in Washington. "It’s whatever Joe says,” he told reporters. “If the team needs me anywhere at all, it is satisfactory to me, for I shall try and deliver the goods. I would, of course, prefer the infield, but if there is not room there, it is all the same to me." Though not the best at fielding, he could (and did) play a variety of positions, covering at third and first while Bill Shipke and Jerry Freeman were struggling and filling in for an injured Jim Delahanty at second base and a hurt Clyde Milan in the outfield. The Washington Post praised his hitting in April: "Unglaub is a batter whom any pitcher must fear, for when he hits the ball it usually goes on a long journey." Russo, however, said "he was never a great hitter." In May, Unglaub missed some time with broken ribs, reportedly caused when Bob Ganley hit him with a baseball bat in a brawl. The Senators denied this, but Ganley was released shortly thereafter. Playing 130 games in his first season with the Senators, Unglaub batted .265 with 43 runs scored, 127 hits, three home runs, and 41 RBI.

In 1910, Unglaub went back to playing first base full time. He appeared in 124 games, accumulating 29 runs scored, 101 hits, and 44 RBI. His batting average dropped to .234, and he hit zero home runs in what would be his last major league season.

Unglaub batted and threw right-handed. He stood 5 feet 11 inches (1.80 m) and weighed 178 pounds (81 kg). In a 595-game major-league career, he batted .258 with 188 runs scored, 554 hits, five home runs, and 216 RBI.

=== Later career (1911–16) ===
Before the 1911 season, the Senators sold Unglaub's contract to the Lincoln Railsplitters of the Western League, where he played and managed. After a season with them, he split 1912 between the Baltimore Orioles (now an International League team) and the Minneapolis Millers of the American Association. He spent 1913 with Minneapolis, then finished out his career with the Fargo-Moorhead Graingrowers, whom he played for and managed for from 1914-16.

== Death ==
During baseball offseasons, Unglaub worked as an engineer at the Pennsylvania Railroad shops in Baltimore. On November 29, 1916, he was supervising repair work on a locomotive when an accident occurred that crushed and mangled his body, killing him. He was 36. Unglaub was laid to rest at Sunny Ridge Memorial Park in Crisfield, Maryland.

== Managerial record ==
Team	Year	Regular season					Postseason			
Team	Year	Games	Won	Lost	Win %	Finish	Won	Lost	Win %	Result
BOA	1907	29	9	20	.250	fired*	–	–	–	–
Total		29	9	20	.310		0	0	–	

* As a player-manager, Unglaub returned to being a player only.

== See also ==
- List of Major League Baseball player–managers
