= Ray Tift =

American baseball player (1884-1945)

- Pitcher
- Born: June 21, 1884; Fitchburg, Massachusetts, U.S.
- Died: March 29, 1945 (aged 60); Verona, New Jersey, U.S.
- Batted: Unknown Threw: Right

MLB debut
- August 7, 1907, for the New York Highlanders

Last MLB appearance
- September 2, 1907, for the New York Highlanders

MLB statistics
- Win–loss record: 0–0
- Earned run average: 4.74
- Strikeouts: 6
- Stats at Baseball Reference

Teams
- New York Highlanders (1907)

Raymond Frank Tift (June 21, 1884 – March 29, 1945) was an American professional baseball pitcher. He played in Major League Baseball with the New York Highlanders in 1907.

== Biography ==
A native of Fitchburg, Massachusetts, Tift graduated from Brown University in 1907. While at Brown, he was a star baseball player who reportedly "showed great nerve in tight places and fielded his position with the greatest accuracy."

Tift signed with the New York Highlanders after graduation, and appeared in four games during New York's 1907 season. With the Highlanders, Tift played with Baseball Hall of Famers Jack Chesbro, Willie Keeler, and Branch Rickey. Tift's major league debut came on August 7, when he pitched six innings in relief of Slow Joe Doyle, allowing five hits and one run in New York's 8-4 loss to the St. Louis Browns at Hilltop Park. Three days later, Tift was the starter for New York in the second game of a doubleheader with the Browns, going seven innings and allowing three runs.

In Tift's third appearance he again relieved Doyle, and reached base himself after being hit by a Bill Donovan pitch, but the Highlanders suffered a 13-6 shellacking at the hands of the Detroit Tigers and Hall of Famers Ty Cobb and Sam Crawford at Bennett Park. Tift's final major league appearance came at Hilltop Park on September 2, when he went five innings in relief of Al Orth as New York was stomped, 12-1, by the Boston Americans and their ace hurler, Hall of Famer Cy Young.

Over four major league appearances, Tift had a 0–0 record, and posted a 4.74 ERA with six strikeouts and four walks in 19 innings.

In 1914, Tift pitched for the Falmouth, Massachusetts "Cottage Club" town team in what is now the Cape Cod Baseball League. Earlier in the season, he had defeated the Cottage Club as a member of the West Somerville, Massachusetts town team. Tift continued to pitch for the Somerville town team for several seasons, and in 1919 was briefly a teammate of Hall of Famer Pie Traynor at Somerville.

Tift died in Verona, New Jersey in 1945 at the age of 60.
