= Harry Hinchman =

American baseball player (1878-1933)

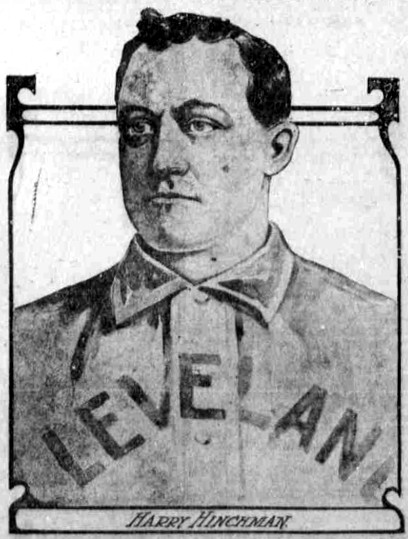
- Second baseman
- Born: August 4, 1878; Philadelphia, Pennsylvania, U.S.
- Died: January 19, 1933 (aged 54); Toledo, Ohio, U.S.
- Batted: Both Threw: Right

MLB debut
- July 29, 1907, for the Cleveland Naps

Last MLB appearance
- October 6, 1907, for the Cleveland Naps

MLB statistics
- Batting average: .216
- Home runs: 0
- Runs batted in: 9
- Stats at Baseball Reference

Teams
- Cleveland Naps (1907)

Harry Sibley Hinchman (August 4, 1878 – January 19, 1933) was an American Major League Baseball second baseman who played for one season. He played in 15 games for the Cleveland Naps during the 1907 Cleveland Naps season.

In contrast to his one season in the major leagues, Hinchman played for 18 seasons in the minor leagues. He began his professional career with the Ilion Typewriters of the New York State League in 1902. His best year as a player in 1915 with the Kansas City Blues of the American Association. That year he had a .326 batting average. His last year as a player was in 1921 with the Chambersburg Maroons of the class D Blue Ridge League.

In addition to being a player, he also managed several minor league teams from 1910 to 1932 (to 1921 as a player/manager and from 1923 solely as manager).
