= John McDonald (pitcher) =

American baseball player (1883-1950)

- Pitcher
- Born: January 27, 1883; Throop, Pennsylvania, U.S.
- Died: April 9, 1950 (aged 67); Roselle, New Jersey, U.S.
- Batted: Right Threw: Right

MLB debut
- September 3, 1907, for the Washington Senators

Last MLB appearance
- September 3, 1907, for the Washington Senators

MLB statistics
- Win–loss record: 0–0
- Earned run average: 9.00
- Strikeouts: 3
- Stats at Baseball Reference

Teams
- Washington Senators (1907)

John Joseph McDonald (January 27, 1883 – April 9, 1950), born John Joseph Mc Donnell, was an American pitcher in Major League Baseball. He played for the Washington Senators in 1907.
