= Rube Manning =

American baseball player (1883–1930)

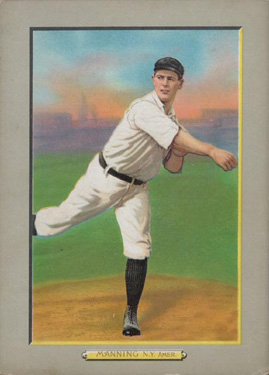
- Pitcher
- Born: April 29, 1883; Chambersburg, Pennsylvania, U.S.
- Died: April 23, 1930 (aged 46); Williamsport, Pennsylvania, U.S.
- Batted: Right Threw: Right

MLB debut
- September 25, 1907, for the New York Highlanders

Last MLB appearance
- August 22, 1910, for the New York Highlanders

MLB statistics
- Win–loss record: 22–32
- Earned run average: 3.14
- Strikeouts: 212
- Stats at Baseball Reference

Teams
- New York Highlanders (1907–1910)

Walter S. "Rube" Manning (April 29, 1883 – April 23, 1930) was an American Major League Baseball pitcher from 1907 to 1910.

Manning started his professional baseball career in 1906. He pitched for the Williamsport Millionaires of the Tri-State League for two years before being purchased by the New York Highlanders. In his first major league season, he went 13–16 with a 2.45 earned run average. Manning continued to pitch for New York through 1910. He then pitched in the minors until 1917.

Manning died at his home in Williamsport, Pennsylvania on April 23, 1930 from a heart attack. His funeral was held on April 26.
