= Bris Lord =

American baseball player (1883-1964)

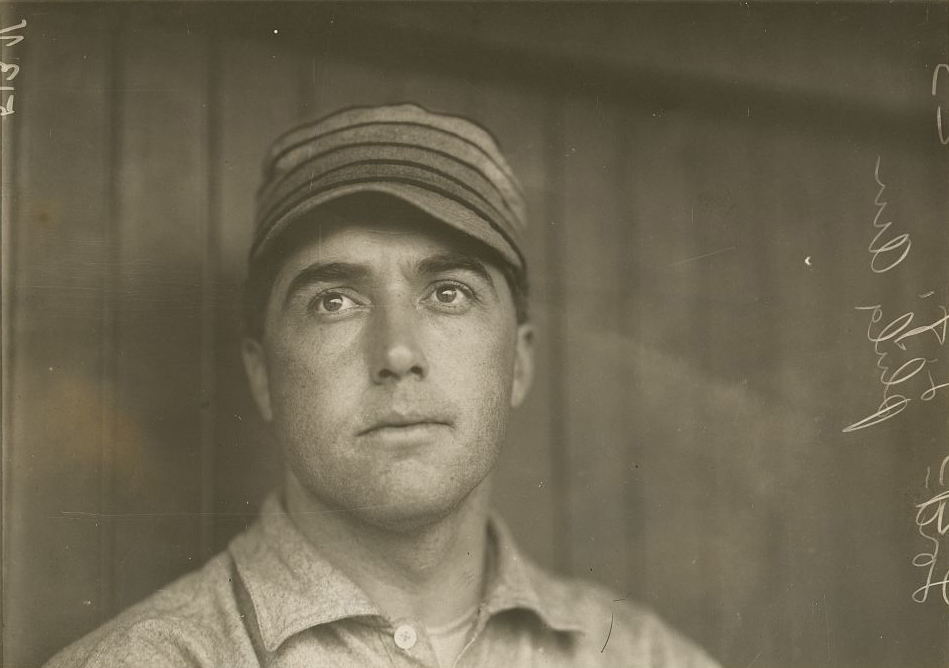
- Outfielder
- Born: September 21, 1883; Upland, Pennsylvania, U.S.
- Died: November 13, 1964 (aged 81); Prince Frederick, Maryland, U.S.
- Batted: Right Threw: Right

MLB debut
- April 21, 1905, for the Philadelphia Athletics

Last MLB appearance
- October 3, 1913, for the Boston Braves

MLB statistics
- Batting average: .256
- Home runs: 13
- Runs batted in: 236
- Stats at Baseball Reference

Teams
- Philadelphia Athletics (1905–1907); Cleveland Naps (1909–1910); Philadelphia Athletics (1910–1912); Boston Braves (1913)

Career highlights and awards
- 2× World Series champion (1910, 1911)

Bristol Robotham Lord (September 21, 1883 – November 13, 1964) was an American professional baseball outfielder. He played in Major League Baseball (MLB) from 1905 to 1913 for the Philadelphia Athletics, Cleveland Naps, and Boston Braves. Lord is best known for a 1910 trade between Philadelphia and Cleveland in which he was exchanged for Morrie Rath and Shoeless Joe Jackson, who became one of the best hitters in baseball history.

== Career ==
Lord made his major league debut in 1905 with the Athletics, appearing in 66 games that season. He became known as "The Human Eyeball" because he was said to have great eyesight. However, in his first three seasons, Lord hit .239, .233, and .182. Because of this lack of progress, Athletics owner/manager Connie Mack sent Lord to the New Orleans minor league team for the 1908 season. After Lord hit .314 for New Orleans, the Cleveland Naps purchased his contract in 1909, and Lord hit .269 in 69 games for Cleveland that year.

Lord was traded from Cleveland back to the Philadelphia Athletics in July 1910 in exchange for infielder Morrie Rath and a player to be named later. Shoeless Joe Jackson had frustrated Athletics owner/manager Mack by not taking baseball seriously, so Mack sent Jackson to Cleveland as the player to be named later. Jackson had a .408 batting average in 1911, and he finished his career with the third-highest batting average of all time.

In 1911, Lord played in a career-high 134 games and had a .310 batting average. He finished 14th that year in the league's Most Valuable Player voting. He won the World Series with Philadelphia in 1910 and 1911, but he hit .182 and .185, respectively, in those World Series.

Lord spent one more season with Philadelphia, playing in 97 games in 1912. He concluded his major league career the next season, playing in 73 games with the Boston Braves. In 742 games over eight seasons, Lord posted a .256 batting average (707-for-2767) with 380 runs, 119 doubles, 49 triples, 13 home runs, 236 runs batted in, 74 stolen bases and 175 bases on balls. He finished his career with a .957 fielding percentage playing at all three outfield positions. In three World Series (1905, 1910, and 1911) covering 16 games, Lord hit .159 (11-for-69) with 5 runs and 4 runs batted in.

== Later life ==
After his playing career, Lord managed several minor league teams as well as an amateur club in Upland, Pennsylvania. He owned a car dealership and a pool hall in Chester, Pennsylvania, then worked at the Delaware County juvenile home in Upland before retiring in the mid-1950s. He had been a member of the Upland Fire Department and the Upland Baptist Church.

Lord died in Prince Frederick, Maryland on November 13, 1964. He was buried at Lawn Croft Cemetery in Linwood, Pennsylvania.
