= Charlie Fritz =

American baseball player (1882–1943)

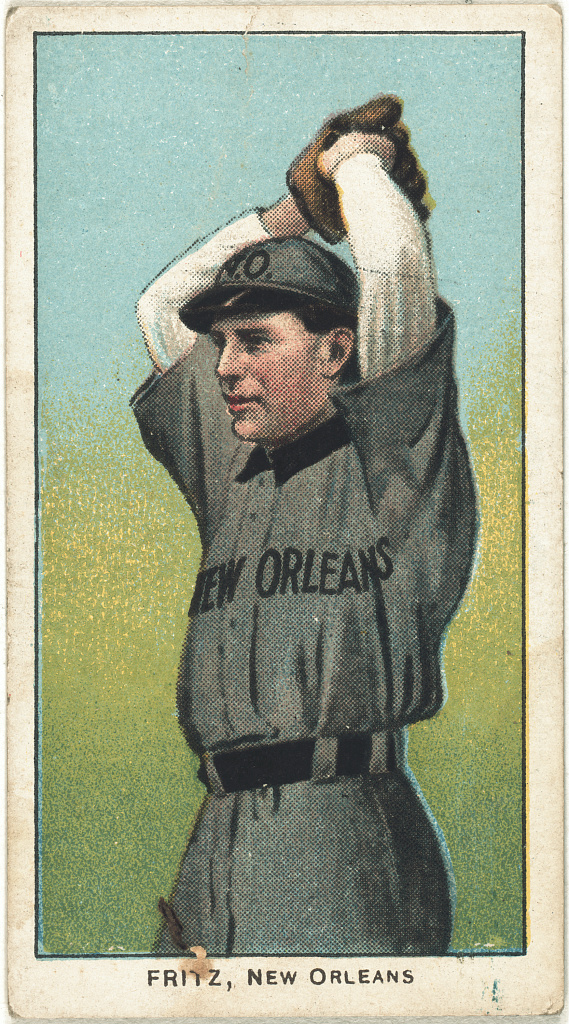
- Pitcher
- Born: June 13, 1882; Mobile, Alabama, U.S.
- Died: July 30, 1943 (aged 61); Mobile, Alabama, U.S.
- Batted: Unknown Threw: Left

MLB debut
- October 5, 1907, for the Philadelphia Athletics

Last MLB appearance
- October 5, 1907, for the Philadelphia Athletics

MLB statistics
- Win–loss record: 0–0
- Earned run average: 3.00
- Strikeouts: 1
- Stats at Baseball Reference

Teams
- Philadelphia Athletics (1907)

Charles Cornelius Fritz (June 13, 1882 – July 30, 1943) was an American Major League Baseball pitcher. He played for the Philadelphia Athletics during the 1907 season.
