= Sam Lanford =

American baseball player

- Pitcher
- Born: January 8, 1886; Woodruff, South Carolina
- Died: September 14, 1970 (aged 84); Woodruff, South Carolina
- Batted: Left Threw: Right

MLB debut
- August 19, 1907, for the Washington Senators

Last MLB appearance
- September 14, 1907, for the Washington Senators

MLB statistics
- Win–loss record: 0–1
- Earned run average: 5.14
- Strikeouts: 2
- Stats at Baseball Reference

Teams
- Washington Senators (1907)

Lewis Grover "Sam" Lanford (January 8, 1886 – September 14, 1970) was an American pitcher in Major League Baseball. He played for the Washington Senators in 1907.
