= Howard Wakefield =

American baseball player (1884–1941)

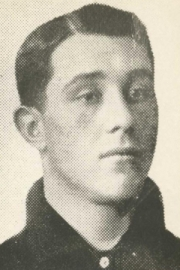
- Catcher
- Born: April 2, 1884; Bucyrus, Ohio, U.S.
- Died: April 16, 1941 (aged 57); Chicago, Illinois, U.S.
- Batted: Right Threw: Right

MLB debut
- September 18, 1905, for the Cleveland Naps

Last MLB appearance
- August 15, 1907, for the Cleveland Naps

MLB statistics
- Batting average: .248
- Games played: 113
- Runs scored: 24
- Stats at Baseball Reference

Teams
- Cleveland Naps (1905); Washington Senators (1906); Cleveland Naps (1907)

Howard John Wakefield (April 2, 1884 – April 16, 1941) was an American professional baseball player in Major League Baseball from 1905 to 1907. Wakefield was a 6-foot, 1 inch, catcher who threw right-handed and batted right-handed. Wakefield played the 1905 and 1907 seasons with the Cleveland Indians. His 1906 season was with the Washington Senators.

A native of Bucyrus, Ohio, he was the father of Dick Wakefield who was also a professional baseball player during the 1940s and early 1950s.

Wakefield died in Chicago, in 1941.

== See also ==
- List of second generation MLB players

== Sources ==
- Baseball Reference

Specific
