= Fred Burchell (baseball) =

American baseball player (1879–1951)

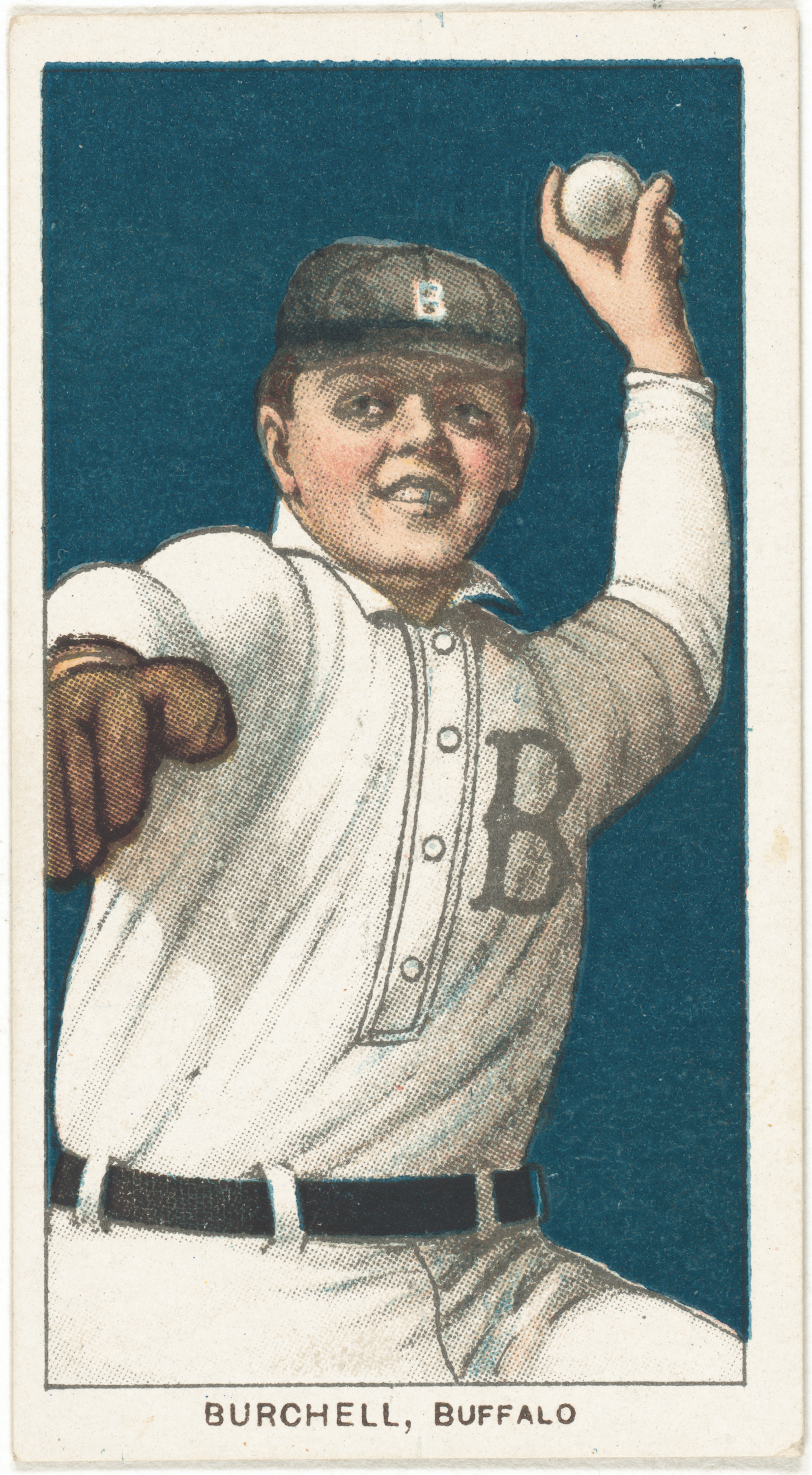
- Pitcher
- Born: July 14, 1879; Perth Amboy, New Jersey, U.S.
- Died: November 20, 1951 (aged 72); Jordan, New York, U.S.
- Batted: Right Threw: Left

MLB debut
- April 17, 1903, for the Philadelphia Phillies

Last MLB appearance
- July 15, 1909, for the Boston Red Sox

MLB statistics
- Win–loss record: 13–15
- Earned run average: 2.93
- Strikeouts: 124

Teams
- Philadelphia Phillies (1903); Boston Americans/Red Sox (1907–1909)

Frederick Duff Burchell (July 14, 1879 – November 20, 1951) was a starting pitcher in Major League Baseball for the Philadelphia Phillies (1903) and Boston Red Sox (1907–1909). Burchell batted right-handed and threw left-handed.

In a four-season career, Burchell posted a 13–15 record with 124 strikeouts and a 2.93 ERA in 285 2/3 innings pitched.

Burchell won ten games for the 1908 Boston Red Sox as part of a rotation that included Cy Young, Cy Morgan and Eddie Cicotte. He later played for several minor league teams and managed the Newark Bears in their 1926 inaugural season.
