= Chief Bender =

Native American baseball player (1884–1954)

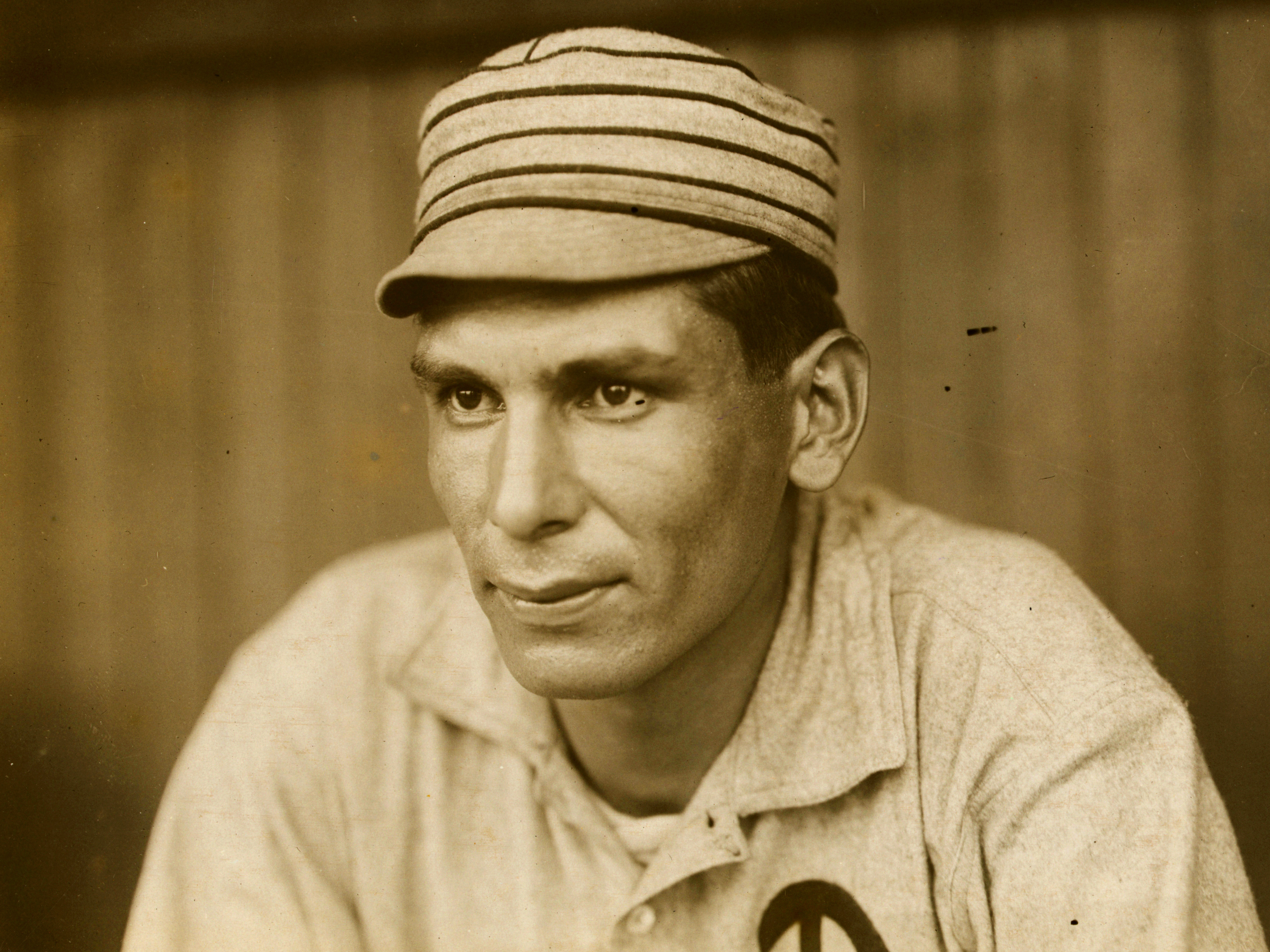
- Bender in 1911
- Pitcher
- Born: May 5, 1884; Crow Wing County, Minnesota, U.S.
- Died: May 22, 1954 (aged 70); Philadelphia, Pennsylvania, U.S.
- Batted: Right Threw: Right

MLB debut
- April 20, 1903, for the Philadelphia Athletics

Last MLB appearance
- July 21, 1925, for the Chicago White Sox

MLB statistics
- Win–loss record: 212–127
- Earned run average: 2.46
- Strikeouts: 1,711
- Stats at Baseball Reference

Teams
- Philadelphia Athletics (1903–1914); Baltimore Terrapins (1915); Philadelphia Phillies (1916–1917); Chicago White Sox (1925)

Career highlights and awards
- 3× World Series champion (1910, 1911, 1913); Pitched a no-hitter on May 12, 1910; Philadelphia Baseball Wall of Fame; Athletics Hall of Fame

Member of the National

Baseball Hall of Fame
- Induction: 1953
- Election method: Veterans Committee

Charles Albert "Chief" Bender (Ojibwe: Mandowescence; May 5, 1884 (Note: There is uncertainty about Bender's birth-date. He was voted the SABR "Centennial Celebrity" of 1983, as the best baseball player or figure born in 1883. However, the SABR Baseball Research Journal for 1983 acknowledges that there are discrepancies in records about Bender's birth year, ranging from 1883 to 1885. They year 1884 is the figure most often given. His grave marker says 1884.) – May 22, 1954) was a Native American professional baseball pitcher who played in Major League Baseball during the 1900s and 1910s. In 1911, Bender tied a record by pitching three complete games in a single World Series. He finished his career with a 212–127 win–loss record for a .625 winning percentage and a career 2.46 earned run average (ERA).

After his major league playing career, Bender's roles in baseball included major league coach, minor league manager and player-manager, college manager, and professional scout. He was elected to the Baseball Hall of Fame in 1953 and died the following year.

== Early life ==
Bender was born in Crow Wing County, Minnesota, as a member of the White Earth Band of the Minnesota Chippewa Tribe. His father was German and his mother was Chippewa. As a child, he was named Mandowescence, which might be translated into English as "Little Spirit Animal". His family had 160 acres (65 ha) on the White Earth Indian Reservation near Detroit Lakes, Minnesota. His father taught him to farm on the reservation. He graduated from Carlisle Indian Industrial School and attended Dickinson College.

== Baseball career ==
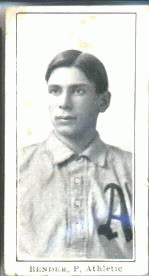
1903 E107 "Chief" Bender (Collection RC)

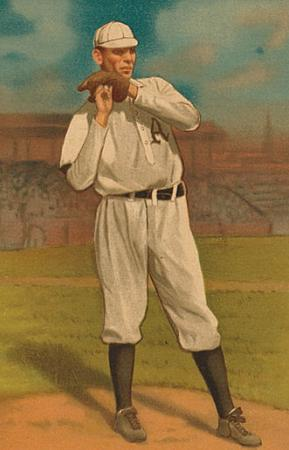
Art of Bender from 1911

=== Early career ===
Bender debuted in the major leagues in 1903. He is one of only a few pitchers in the 20th century to throw 200 or more innings at the age of 19. His walks per nine innings rate were 2.17; only a few pitchers since 1893 have had a rate below 2.2 at the age of 20 or younger. That year, he also won a game against Cy Young and met his future wife Marie.

In 1905, Bender earned an 18–11 win–loss record with a 2.83 ERA, helping the A's win the AL pennant; but they lost the World Series in five games to the New York Giants. Bender went 1–1 with a 1.06 ERA in the series, pitching a 4-hit, 3–0 complete-game shutout in Game 2, striking out 9. He went the distance again in Game 5, giving up just two earned runs in eight innings, losing 2–0 to Christy Mathewson.

After solid seasons in 1906 (15–10, 2.53), 1907 (16–8, 2.05), 1908 (8–9 despite a 1.75 ERA), and 1909 (18–8, 1.66), he led the Athletics to the AL pennant in 1910, as Philadelphia went 102–48, 14 1/2 games ahead of the second-place New York Highlanders. Bender led the AL in winning percentage, at .821, going 23–5 with a 1.58 ERA. He went 1–1 with a 1.93 ERA in the World Series as the A's beat the Chicago Cubs, who had gone 104–50 in the regular season, in five games. Bender pitched a complete-game three-hitter in the opener, striking out 8 and giving up only one unearned run. He lost Game 4 of the series in another complete-game effort, 4–3 in 10 innings. Bender pitched all 9 2/3 innings for the Athletics, striking out 6.

=== Later career ===
In 1911, he led the AL in winning percentage again (.773), going 17–5 with a 2.16 ERA as the A's won their second consecutive AL pennant, going 101–50 and finishing 13 1/2 games ahead of the Detroit Tigers. In a rematch of the 1905 World Series, the Athletics got their revenge, defeating the New York Giants and becoming the first American League team to win back-to-back World Series (the Chicago Cubs from the NL had won back-to-back titles in 1907 and 1908). After losing the opener 2–1 to Mathewson, though pitching a complete game, giving up just 5 hits and 2 runs (1 earned run) and striking out 11, Bender returned in Game 4, beating the Giants 4–2 on a complete game 7-hitter, and closed out the Series in game 6 with a 13–2 A's victory. Bender again went the distance (his 3rd complete game of the series), a 4-hit performance which he gave up no earned runs (the two Giants runs were unearned). He went 2–1, with 1.04 ERA and 3 complete games in the series.

In 1912 Bender was 13–8 with a 2.74 ERA. He did not start for nearly 40 games late in the year and was suspended by the A's in September for alcohol abuse. His next contract had a clause saying he had to abstain from drinking to earn his full salary. In 1913, he went 21–10 with a 2.21 ERA, helping the A's win their third AL pennant in four years. They would also make it three World Series titles in four years by defeating the Giants in five games. Bender went 2–0 in the series with complete-game victories in Games 1 and 4.

He led the AL in winning percentage (.850) for the third time in 1914, going 17–3 with a 2.26 ERA, and the A's would win their fourth AL pennant in five years. But the Athletics would be swept by the underdog Boston Braves, with Bender losing Game 1 7–1, giving up 6 earned runs in 5 1/3 innings. It was the only World Series game he failed to finish, after completing his previous nine starts in the Fall Classic.

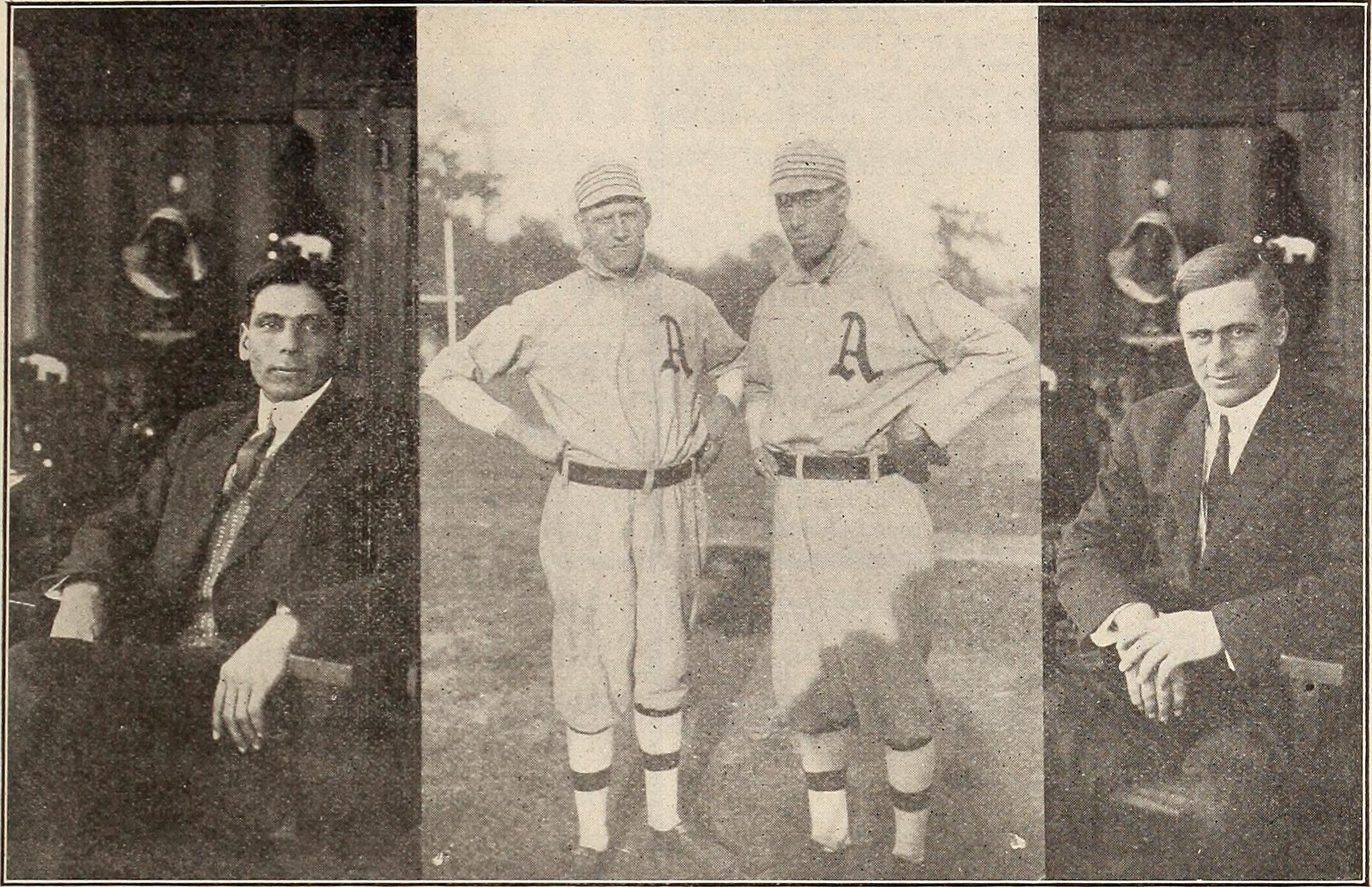
The four stars of the world champion Philadelphia Athletics — Bender, Cy Morgan, Jack Coombs and Rube Oldring — were featured in the Thanhouser Company film, The Baseball Bug (1911)

When the Baltimore Terrapins of the upstart Federal League offered Bender a large salary increase, Athletics manager Connie Mack knew he could not hope to match it and released Bender. In his only season with the Terrapins, Bender went 4–16, and his 3.99 ERA was near the bottom of the league. Bender later regretted leaving Philadelphia for the upstart league. After two years with the Philadelphia Phillies, he left baseball in 1918 to work in the shipyards during World War I.

Over his career, his win–loss record was 212–127, for a .625 winning percentage (a category in which he led the American League in three seasons), and a career 2.46 ERA. His talent was even more noticeable in the high-pressure environment of the World Series; in five trips to the championship series, he managed six wins and a 2.44 ERA, completing 9 of the 10 games he started, putting him second in World Series history behind Christy Mathewson. In the 1911 Series, he pitched three complete games to tie Mathewson's record of three complete games in a World Series. He also threw a no-hitter on May 12, 1910, beating the Cleveland Indians 4–0.

Bender was an adept hitting pitcher in his major league career, posting a .212 batting average (243-for-1,147) with 102 runs, 6 home runs and 116 RBI. Bender notably hit two home runs in one game—rare for the dead ball era—in a 1906 game where he replaced outfielder Topsy Hartsel. He had 10 or more RBI in a season four times, with a career-high 16 in 1910.

=== Minor leagues ===
In 1919, Bender pitched in the minor leagues for the Richmond Colts of the Virginia League. He earned a 29–2 record that year. He spent the next three seasons as a player-manager: the first two seasons with the New Haven Weissmen/Indians and the third was with the Class AA Reading Aces. For the 1920 New Haven team, Bender recorded 25 wins as a pitcher. His record declined to 13–7 in 1921 and 8–13 in 1922.

In 1923 and 1924, Bender did not manage, but did pitch for the minor league Baltimore Orioles and the New Haven Profs, respectively. He went 6–3 with a 5.03 ERA for Baltimore, then went 6–4 with a 3.07 ERA for New Haven.

=== Coaching career ===
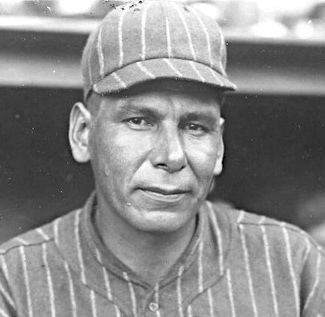
Bender in 1925

Bender came back to the majors as a coach for the Chicago White Sox (1925–26) and even made a cameo appearance on the mound in 1925. Between 1924 and 1928, Bender managed the baseball team at the United States Naval Academy, where he had a record of 42–34–2. In 1931, he coached for the Giants and the next year managed the Yankees affiliate in the Central League. He then returned to the Athletics where he worked as a scout, minor league manager, and coach. The Yankees signed Bender in February 1942 as a pitching coach for the Newark Bears.

== Personal life ==
Bender was nicknamed "Chief", a common nickname for baseball players of Native American descent. Biographer Tom Swift writes that Bender "was often portrayed as a caricature and was the subject of myriad cartoons – many exhibits of narrow-mindedness. After he threw one of the most dominating games of the early years of the American League, Bender was depicted wielding a tomahawk and wearing a headdress as though he was a happy warrior."

He also faced discrimination on the field. Swift writes that taunting from the bench was common in Bender's era and that the opposition or the fans often made war whoops or yelled taunts such as "Nig!" or "Back to the reservation!" Bender usually remained calm, sometimes smiling at the insults. After an inning in which he had pitched particularly well, he might yell back, "Foreigners! Foreigners!"

Off the baseball field, Bender was one of several prominent baseball players who enjoyed trap shooting, bowling, and golf. He felt that shooting in the offseason helped to train his eye and increase his self-control. He worked in sporting goods at Wanamaker's in Philadelphia during his early playing days. He opened his own store, Bender Sporting Goods, in 1914.

In February 1917, Bender was charged with manslaughter when a car he owned struck and killed a boy in Philadelphia and the driver sped off. He was cleared of wrongdoing later the same month by a coroner's jury.

Bender's brother, John C. Bender, also played professional baseball. John Bender was suspended from minor league baseball for three years beginning in 1908 after he stabbed his manager, Win Clark, several times during a fight. John Bender is sometimes erroneously described as having died on a baseball field, but he died at a restaurant in 1911, not long after attempting a professional baseball comeback.

== Later life ==
Late in his life, Bender's friend John Burns gave him a plot of land in Haddon Heights, New Jersey. Bender planted a garden on the land and worked with it almost every day, even though he lived in Philadelphia, about 12 miles away. He grew fruits and vegetables, especially corn, and ate, sold, or gave away what he grew. After the 1950 season, Bender took his last position in the major leagues, replacing Mickey Cochrane as the pitching coach for the Athletics. Bender's coaching helped pitcher Bobby Shantz win the American League Most Valuable Player Award in 1952. Bender was struggling with health problems, including arthritis and a cancer he did not disclose, during his tenure with Philadelphia.

In his last days, Bender remained close friends with Athletics coach Bing Miller, who used to bring Bender a container of ice cream almost every day. Bender was hospitalized in Philadelphia in mid-April 1954. He died there on May 22, 1954, of prostate cancer. He had also been suffering from cardiac problems. While he had been hospitalized, Bender sent his wife, Marie, to Shibe Park for each home game so that she could report back to him on his team's pitching.

Bender was buried in the Philadelphia suburb of Roslyn, Pennsylvania.

== Legacy ==
Bender was well-liked by his fellow players. Teammate Rube Bressler called him "one of the kindest and finest men who ever lived". Athletics teammate Ed Pinnance named his son "Bender" after the pitcher. Ty Cobb praised Bender's intelligence, describing a play by Bender in the 1911 World Series as "the greatest bit of brainwork I ever saw in a ballgame". Cobb was not alone in regard for his intelligence; Bender drew similar praise from many other teammates, opponents, and umpires, including Billy Evans and Nap Lajoie. Bender was also known for his keen eye and ability to discern subtle details of opposing pitchers' motions to help his teammates predict their pitches. His success led other teams to suspect Bender and the Athletics were stealing signs; though teammate Cy Morgan denied the A's were stealing signs, Danny Murphy praised Bender's ability and said he could "come pretty near to getting anybody's signs." Mack often put this skill to use by occasionally using Bender as the third or first base coach on days he wasn't scheduled to pitch.

The innovator of the slider is debated, but some credit Bender as the first to use the pitch, then called a "nickel curve", in the 1910s. Bender used his slider to help him achieve a no-hitter and win 212 games.

Bender was voted into the Baseball Hall of Fame in 1953, less than a year before his death. He died before his induction ceremony and Marie accepted the Hall of Fame plaque on his behalf.

In 1981, Lawrence Ritter and Donald Honig included him in their book The 100 Greatest Baseball Players of All Time. The Minnesota Humanities Center published a children book about his life, Charles Albert Bender: National Hall of Fame Pitcher, written by Kade Ferris (Turtle Mountain Chippewa/Métis) and illustrated by Tashia Hart (Red Lake Chippewa).

== See also ==
- List of Major League Baseball career wins leaders
- List of Major League Baseball annual saves leaders
- List of Major League Baseball career hit batsmen leaders
- List of Major League Baseball no-hitters

== Citations ==
| Preceded by Addie Joss | No-hitter pitcher May 12, 1910 | Succeeded by Smoky Joe Wood |
