= Rube Oldring =

American baseball player

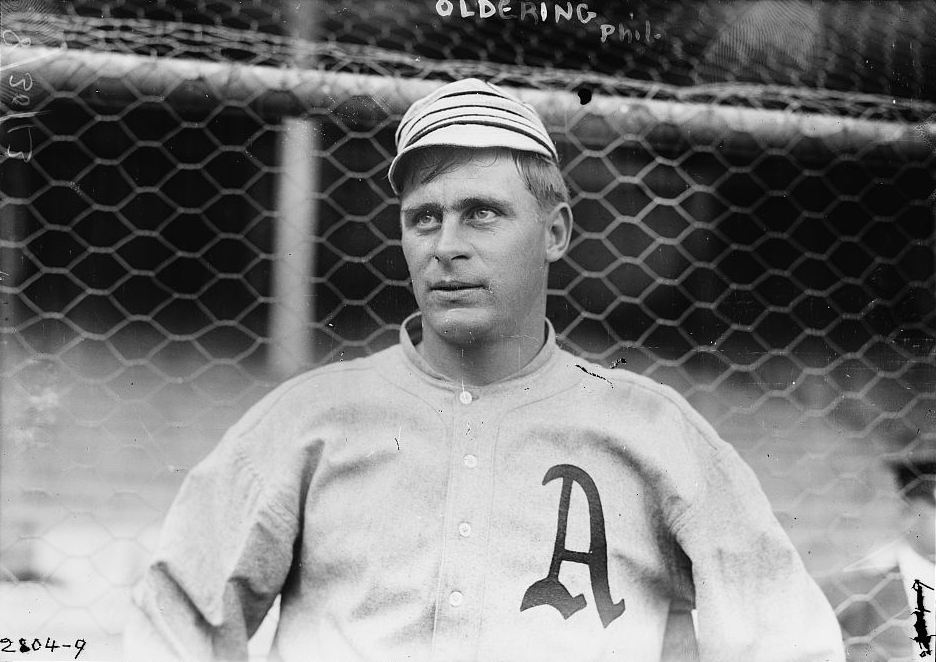
- Outfielder
- Born: May 30, 1884; New York City, New York, U.S.
- Died: September 9, 1961 (aged 77); Bridgeton, New Jersey, U.S.
- Batted: Right Threw: Right

MLB debut
- October 2, 1905, for the New York Highlanders

Last MLB appearance
- August 30, 1918, for the Philadelphia Athletics

MLB statistics
- Batting average: .270
- Home runs: 27
- Runs batted in: 471
- Stolen bases: 197
- Stats at Baseball Reference

Teams
- New York Highlanders (1905); Philadelphia Athletics (1906–1916); New York Yankees (1916); Philadelphia Athletics (1918)

Career highlights and awards
- 2× World Series champion (1911, 1913); Philadelphia Baseball Wall of Fame

Reuben Henry Oldring (May 30, 1884 – September 9, 1961) was an American professional baseball player who played outfield in the major leagues from 1905 to 1918. He played for the Philadelphia Athletics and New York Yankees.

== Early life ==
Oldring was born in New York City and attended Bridgeton High School in Bridgeton, New Jersey. He started his professional baseball career in the Southern Association in 1905. That October, he was drafted by the Philadelphia Athletics in the Rule 5 draft.

== Baseball career ==
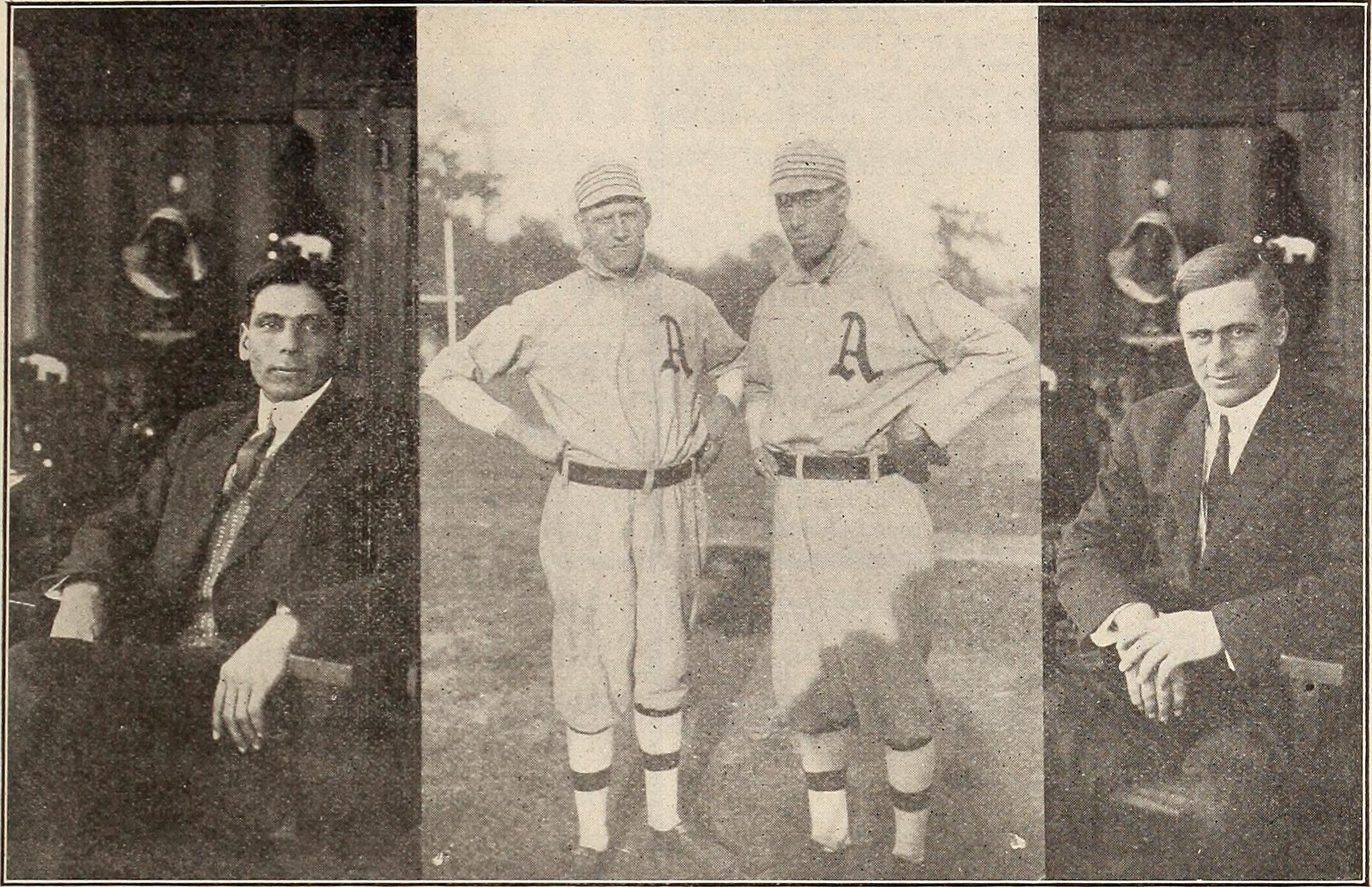
Oldring (far right) as one of the four Athletics players to appear in The Baseball Bug (1911)

From 1907 to 1915, Oldring was a regular outfielder on the A's. He played in three World Series with them. He hit .194 (12-for-62) with 7 runs, 1 home run and 3 RBI in 15 postseason games.

Oldring and three other stars from the 1911 World Series champion Athletics — Chief Bender, Cy Morgan and Jack Coombs — were featured in the Thanhouser Company film called The Baseball Bug. In 1913, the Athletics won another World Series, and Oldring won a Cadillac after being voted the favorite player of fans in Philadelphia.

The team returned to the World Series in 1914, but they were swept by the Boston Braves. Oldring recorded only one hit in 17 plate appearances in that series, and he explained that he had been going through difficulties in his personal life. After his engagement to Hannah Thomas had been announced in the newspaper, a woman surfaced who said she was Helen Oldring, his common-law wife. Rube Oldring said he had once lived with Helen but that they had never been married. Oldring and Hannah Thomas were later married and remained together for 47 years.

In 1239 games over 13 seasons, Oldring posted a .270 batting average (1268-for-4690) with 616 runs, 205 doubles, 76 triples, 27 home runs, 471 RBI, 197 stolen bases, 206 bases on balls, .307 on-base percentage and .364 slugging percentage. He finished his career with a .959 fielding percentage. Although his primary positions were center and left field, he also played right field, first, second, third base and shortstop.

Oldring played in the minor leagues for several years after his major league career was over. In 1923, he hit .342 for Wilson of the Virginia League and also managed the team to the pennant.

== Later life ==
A farmer after he ended his career in baseball, Oldring died of a heart attack at his home in Bridgeton, New Jersey, at the age of 77.

== See also ==
- List of Major League Baseball career stolen bases leaders
