= Charlie Armbruster =

American baseball player (1880–1964)

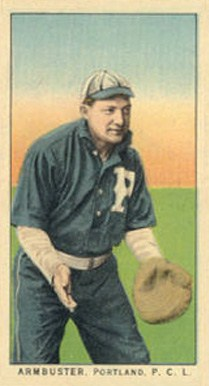
- Catcher
- Born: August 30, 1880; Cincinnati, Ohio, US
- Died: October 7, 1964 (aged 84); Grants Pass, Oregon, US
- Batted: Right Threw: Right

MLB debut
- July 17, 1905, for the Boston Americans

Last MLB appearance
- September 11, 1907, for the Chicago White Sox

MLB statistics
- Batting average: .149
- Hits: 0
- Runs batted in: 12
- Stats at Baseball Reference

Teams
- Boston Americans (1905–1907); Chicago White Sox (1907)

Charles A. Armbruster (August 30, 1880 – October 7, 1964) was an American backup catcher in Major League Baseball who played from 1905 through 1907 for the Boston Americans and the Chicago White Sox.

== Biography ==
A native of Cincinnati, Ohio, Ambruster shared catching duties with Lou Criger for the Boston Americans in part of three seasons. In 1906 he appeared in a career-high 72 games and hit .144 (21-for-201). In a three-year career, Ambruster was a .149 hitter (53-for-355) with 24 runs and 12 RBI in 131 games. He batted and threw right-handed. Ambruster died in Grants Pass, Oregon at the age of 84.

== See also ==
- Boston Red Sox all-time roster
- Chicago White Sox all-time roster
