= Rudy Bell =

American baseball player

- Outfielder
- Born: January 1, 1881; Wausau, Wisconsin, U.S.
- Died: July 28, 1955 (aged 74); Albuquerque, New Mexico, U.S.
- Batted: Right Threw: Right

MLB debut
- September 14, 1907, for the New York Highlanders

Last MLB appearance
- October 5, 1907, for the New York Highlanders

MLB statistics
- Batting average: .212
- Home runs: 0
- Runs batted in: 3
- Stats at Baseball Reference

Teams
- New York Highlanders (1907)

John "Rudy" Bell (January 1, 1881 – July 28, 1955), originally known as Rudolph Fred Baerwald, was an American Major League Baseball outfielder. Bell played for the New York Highlanders during the 1907 season. Throughout his career, spanning 17 games, he achieved 11 hits, 3 RBIs, and a batting average of .212. He batted and threw right-handed.

Bell was born in Wausau, Wisconsin, and died in Albuquerque, New Mexico.
