= George Craig (baseball) =

American baseball player (1887–1911)

- Pitcher
- Born: November 15, 1887; Philadelphia
- Died: April 23, 1911 (aged 23); Indianapolis, Indiana
- Batted: Unknown Threw: Left

MLB debut
- July 19, 1907, for the Philadelphia Athletics

Last MLB appearance
- September 17, 1907, for the Philadelphia Athletics

MLB statistics
- Win–loss record: 0–0
- Earned run average: 10.80
- Strikeouts: 0
- Stats at Baseball Reference

Teams
- Philadelphia Athletics (1907)

George McCarthy Craig (November 15, 1887 – April 23, 1911), nicknamed "Lefty", was an American Major League Baseball pitcher. He played for the Philadelphia Athletics during the 1907 season. He was born in Philadelphia.

He appeared in just two games and posted a 10.80 earned run average without a decision in 1 2/3 innings of work.

Craig died in Indianapolis, Indiana, at the age of 23 after being shot by a burglar.

== Sources ==
- Career statistics from Baseball Reference · Baseball Reference (Minors) · Retrosheet · Baseball Almanac
