= Bunk Congalton =

Canadian baseball player (1875-1937)

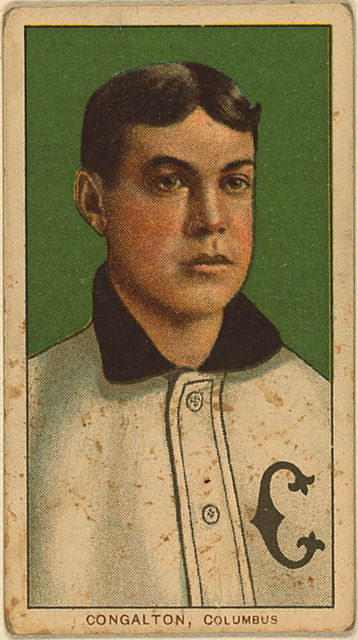
- Right fielder
- Born: January 24, 1875; Guelph, Ontario, Canada
- Died: August 19, 1937 (aged 62); Cleveland, Ohio, U.S.
- Batted: Left Threw: Left

MLB debut
- April 17, 1902, for the Chicago Orphans

Last MLB appearance
- October 5, 1907, for the Boston Americans

MLB statistics
- Batting average: .292
- Home runs: 6
- Runs batted in: 131
- Stats at Baseball Reference

Teams
- Chicago Orphans (1902); Cleveland Naps (1905–1907); Boston Americans (1907)

William Millar "Bunk" Congalton (January 24, 1875 – August 19, 1937) was a Canadian right fielder in Major League Baseball. A native of Guelph, Ontario, he stood 5'11" and weighed 190 lbs. Congalton was a minor league star who twice led the minor leagues in batting average.

Congalton began his professional career in 1895, and spent the rest of the decade playing for various minor league teams in the Canadian League, including in Guelph and Hamilton. With the Hamilton team in 1898, Congalton had a .333 batting average and was noted for having "phenomenal playing" throughout the season. He rounded out the 1890s by playing for the Milwaukee Brewers, then managed by Connie Mack.

After two more seasons in the minor leagues, the Chicago Orphans signed him to a major league contract in January 1902. After a strong start he began to struggle, and after 47 games Chicago sent him to the Colorado Springs Millionaires of the Western League, where he stayed until 1904. With Colorado Springs, he led the Western League in batting average in both 1903 (.363) an 1904 (.327). He spent 1905 with the Columbus Senators of the American Association, then rejoined the major leagues late in the season with the Cleveland Naps. Congalton spent the full 1906 on the Naps' roster as a right fielder. He had a .320 batting average in 117 games, which was fourth in the American League, and he also ranked in the league's top ten for on-base percentage (.361), slugging percentage (.396), and home runs (3).

Congalton and Rudy Hulswitt were arrested in Columbus in November 1906 after a poker game they participated in was raided by police. He returned to the Naps to start 1907, but was purchased by the Boston Americans after nine games. Congalton spent the rest of the season in Boston, hitting .286 in 124 games, which was tenth-best in the American League. After the season, he rejoined Columbus, where he spent the next five seasons. After a down year in 1912, Congalton was sent to the Toledo Mud Hens for the remainder of that season, then he rounded out his career in 1913 and 1914 with the Omaha Rourkes of the Western League.

After retiring, Congalton lived in Cleveland and worked in the public utility's department. He died at the age of 62 in Cleveland, Ohio after suffering a heart attack the previous Sunday at a Cleveland Indians game. He was interred at the Crown Hill Cemetery in Twinsburg, Ohio.
