= Bill Hogg =

American baseball player (1881-1909)

- Pitcher
- Born: September 11, 1881; Port Huron, Michigan, U.S.
- Died: December 8, 1909 (aged 28); New Orleans, Louisiana, U.S.
- Batted: Right Threw: Right

MLB debut
- April 25, 1905, for the New York Highlanders

Last MLB appearance
- October 2, 1908, for the New York Highlanders

MLB statistics
- Win–loss record: 37-50
- Earned run average: 3.06
- Strikeouts: 368
- Stats at Baseball Reference

Teams
- New York Highlanders (1905–1908)

William Johnston Hogg (September 11, 1881 – December 8, 1909), nicknamed "Buffalo Bill", was an American right-handed pitcher in Major League Baseball. He played four seasons with the New York Highlanders from 1905 to 1908.

Born in Port Huron, Michigan, Hogg played in 116 Major League games and had a record of 37–50 in 730 innings pitched.

During his second season in baseball (1902), as a member of the Seattle Clamdiggers, Hogg was suspended from the team for attacking a newspaper reporter. According to The Oregonian in 1903 Hogg was a "trouble-maker" and "his love for drink would not be kept under control, and it was not long until he was mixed up in a street fight, in which he was stabbed".

In 1906, Hogg hit Cleveland Naps player Bill Bradley with a pitch, fracturing Bradley's arm, and was quoted as saying: "That big Frenchman (Nap Lajoie) is next on my list." Hogg was once almost traded from the Highlanders to the Detroit Tigers for Ty Cobb in 1907, according to Cobb's biography written by Al Stump. The deal was nixed at the last minute by Tigers president Bill Yawkey.

Hogg died in 1909 at age 28 in New Orleans, Louisiana of Bright's disease.
