= Cy Morgan =

American baseball player (1878–1962)

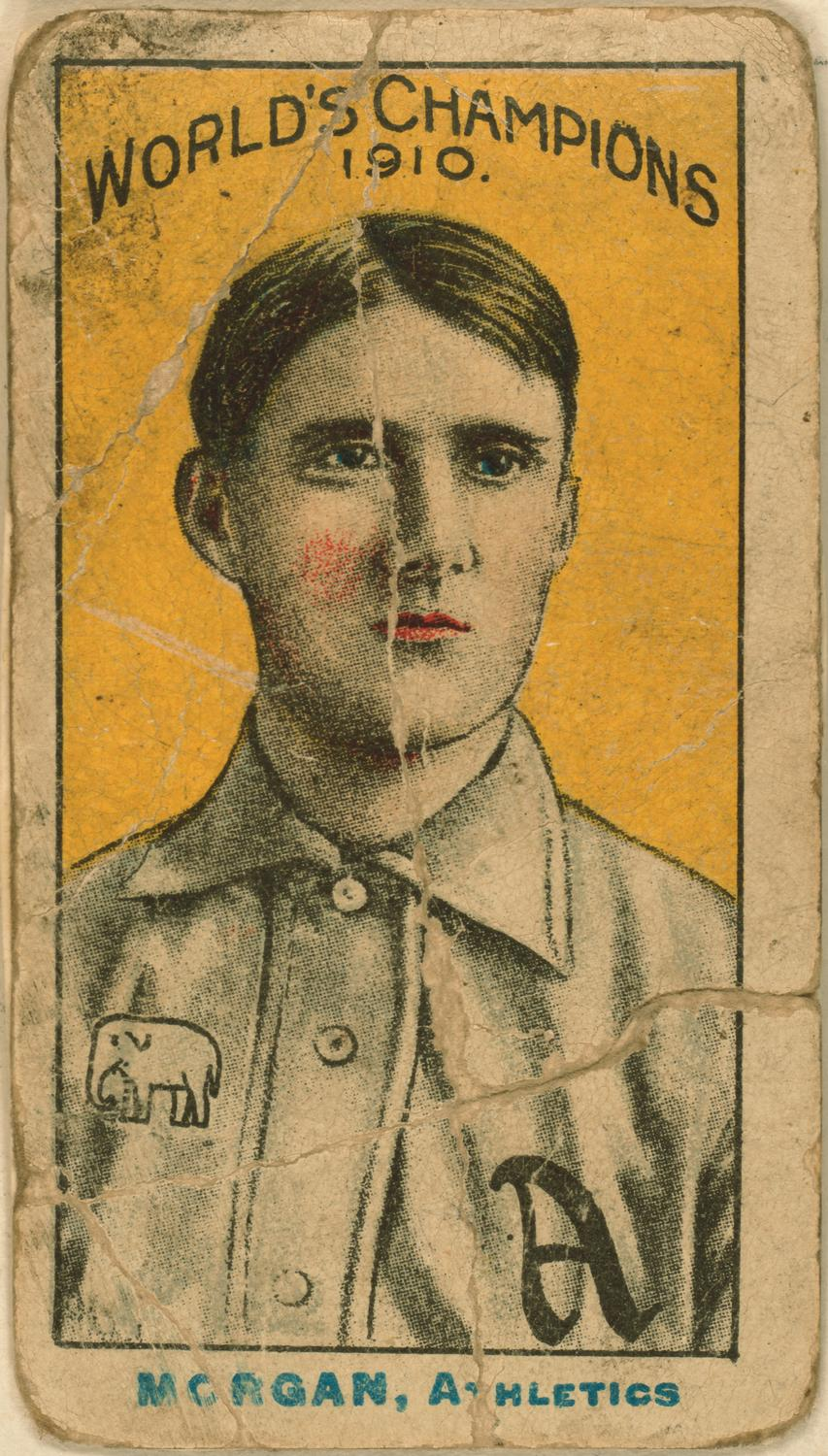
- Pitcher
- Born: November 10, 1878; Pomeroy, Ohio, U.S.
- Died: June 28, 1962 (aged 83); Wheeling, West Virginia, U.S.
- Batted: Right Threw: Right

MLB debut
- September 18, 1903, for the St. Louis Browns

Last MLB appearance
- September 1, 1913, for the Cincinnati Reds

MLB statistics
- Win–loss record: 78–78
- Earned run average: 2.51
- Strikeouts: 667
- Stats at Baseball Reference

Teams
- St. Louis Browns (1903–1905, 1907); Boston Americans / Red Sox (1907–1909); Philadelphia Athletics (1909–1912); Cincinnati Reds (1913)

Career highlights and awards
- 2× World Series champion (1910, 1911)

Harry Richard "Cy" Morgan (November 10, 1878 – June 28, 1962) was an American Major League Baseball pitcher with the St. Louis Browns, Boston Red Sox, Philadelphia Athletics and the Cincinnati Reds between 1903 and 1913. Morgan batted and threw right-handed. He was born in Pomeroy, Ohio

He helped the Athletics win the 1910 and 1911 World Series. The 1912 Reach Guide credits him with helping carry the pitching burden for the 1911 team while stars Jack Coombs and Chief Bender were less effective than usual early in the season.

== Notable career achievements ==
- Led the American League in Hits Allowed per 9 Innings Pitched (6.26) in 1909. This is also an Athletics' single season record.
- Athletics' Career Leader in Hits Allowed per 9 Innings Pitched (6.86).
- Ranks 42nd on MLB Career ERA List (2.51).
- Ranks 25th on MLB Career Hits Allowed per 9 Innings Pitched List (7.35).

In 10 seasons he had a win–loss record of 78–78 in 210 Games, 172 Games Started, 107 Complete Games, 15 Shutouts, 29 Games Finished, 3 Saves, 1,445 1/3 Innings Pitched, 1,180 Hits Allowed, 586 Runs Allowed, 403 Earned Runs Allowed, 18 Home Runs Allowed, 578 Walks Allowed, 667 Strikeouts, 95 Hit Batsmen, 59 Wild Pitches, 5,497 Batters Faced, 5 Balks, and a 2.51 ERA.

He died in Wheeling, West Virginia on June 28, 1962, of coronary artery disease.

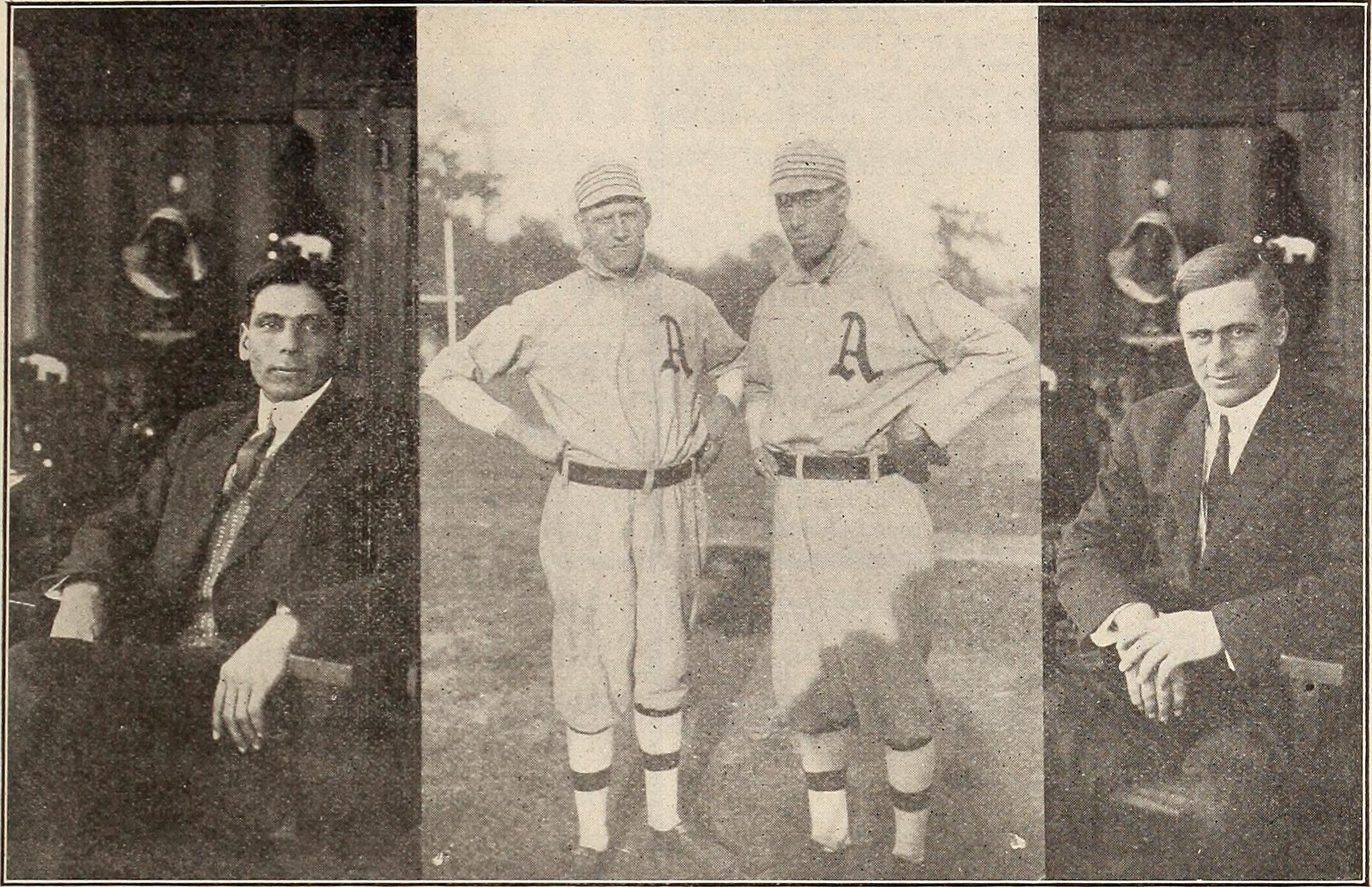
The four stars of the world champion Philadelphia Athletics — Chief Bender, Cy Morgan, Jack Coombs and Rube Oldring — were featured in the Thanhouser Company film, The Baseball Bug (1911)

== See also ==
- List of Major League Baseball career hit batsmen leaders
