= John Knight (baseball) =

American baseball player (1885-1965)

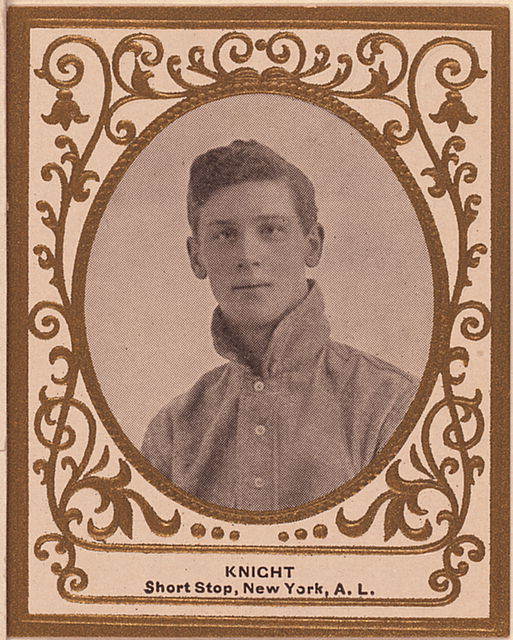
- Infielder
- Born: October 6, 1885; Philadelphia, Pennsylvania, U.S.
- Died: December 19, 1965 (aged 80); Walnut Creek, California, U.S.
- Batted: Right Threw: Right

MLB debut
- April 14, 1905, for the Philadelphia Athletics

Last MLB appearance
- October 4, 1913, for the New York Yankees

MLB statistics
- Batting average: .239
- Home runs: 14
- Runs batted in: 270
- Stats at Baseball Reference

Teams
- Philadelphia Athletics (1905–1907); Boston Americans (1907); New York Highlanders (1909–1911); Washington Senators (1912); New York Yankees (1913)

John Wesley Knight (October 6, 1885 – December 19, 1965) was an American professional baseball infielder. He played in Major League Baseball (MLB) between 1905 and 1913 for the Philadelphia Athletics, Boston Americans, New York Highlanders/Yankees, and Washington Senators. A native of Philadelphia, he was signed out of the University of Pennsylvania.

== Career ==
Knight was nineteen when he entered the majors in 1905 with the Philadelphia Athletics, playing for them two and a half years before joining the Boston Americans (1907), New York Highlanders/Yankees (1909–11, 1913), and Washington Senators (1912). Knight was in the Athletics 1905 Opening Day as a replacement for incumbent shortstop Monte Cross, out until mid-season with a broken hand. He responded hitting .400 in June, but faded after that and finished the season at .203.

In the 1907 midseason Knight was sent to Boston in exchange for Jimmy Collins. He spent 1908 with Triple-A Baltimore Orioles and returned to the majors with New York a year later. His most productive season came in 1910, when he posted a career-high .312 (5th in American League) and led his team in seven offensive categories. In 1911 he was considered in the MVP vote after hitting .268 with 32 extrabases and 62 runs batted in. Another deal in 1912 sent him to the Senators, who released him to Double-A Jersey City Giants, but he returned to New York in 1913 to finish his major league career.

In an eight-year career, Knight was a .239 hitter (636-for-2664) with 14 home runs and 270 RBI in 767 games, including 301 runs, 96 doubles, 24 triples and 86 stolen bases. He made 755 infield appearances at shortstop (316), third base (211), first base (124) and second base (104) and one at right field, for a collective .933 fielding percentage.

After that, his frequent travels took Knight to the Minneapolis Millers (American Association); Seattle Rainiers and Oakland Oaks (Pacific Coast League), Denver Bears (Western League) and Sacramento Solons (PCL), before returning to Denver as player-manager in 1928 for his last baseball season. His son stated that Knight did not enjoy managing as much as he had playing. He was just briefly at the University of Pennsylvania Dental School in 1912.

Knight became an accountant in 1927 and from 1950–1965, he lived with his daughter in Walnut Creek, California. Knight died at Walnut Creek Hospital on September 18, 1965 after a brief illness. His funeral would be held on December 21 in Oakland.
