= 1906 Philadelphia Athletics season =

1906 Philadelphia Athletics
- League: American League
- Ballpark: Columbia Park
- City: Philadelphia
- Record: 78–67 (.538)
- League place: 4th
- Owners: Benjamin Shibe, Tom Shibe, John Shibe, Connie Mack, Sam Jones, Frank Hough
- Managers: Connie Mack

The 1906 Philadelphia Athletics season involved the A's finishing fourth in the American League with a record of 78 wins and 67 losses.

== Preseason ==
=== 1906 Philadelphia City Series ===
The Athletics played five of nine scheduled games against the Philadelphia Phillies for the local championship in the preseason city series. The Athletics defeated the Phillies, 4 games to 1.

AL Philadelphia Athletics (4) vs. NL Philadelphia Phillies (1)

Game	Date	Score	Location	Time	Attendance
1	March 31, 1906	No Game - Rain	Philadelphia Ball Park	-	-
2	April 2, 1906	Philadelphia Athletics – 1, Philadelphia Athletics – 7	Columbia Park	2:00	5,000
3	April 3, 1906	Philadelphia Athletics – 3, Philadelphia Phillies – 0	Philadelphia Ball Park	1:45	4,508
4	April 4, 1906	Philadelphia Phillies – 0, Philadelphia Athletics – 1	Columbia Park	-	4,024
5	April 5, 1906	Philadelphia Athletics – 1, Philadelphia Phillies – 4	Philadelphia Ball Park	1:35	4,175
6	April 6, 1906	No Game - Cold	Columbia Park	-	-
7	April 7, 1906	Philadelphia Phillies – 2, Philadelphia Athletics – 7	Columbia Park	1:45	8,211
8	April 9, 1906	No Game - Rain	Philadelphia Ball Park	-	-
9	April 10, 1906	No Game - Wet Grounds	Philadelphia Ball Park	-	-

The A's moved to 18-15 against the Phillies after the 1906 series.

== Regular season ==
=== Season standings ===
American League
Team	W	L	Pct.	GB	Home	Road
Chicago White Sox	93	58	.616	—	54‍–‍23	39‍–‍35
New York Highlanders	90	61	.596	3	53‍–‍23	37‍–‍38
Cleveland Naps	89	64	.582	5	47‍–‍30	42‍–‍34
Philadelphia Athletics	78	67	.538	12	48‍–‍23	30‍–‍44
St. Louis Browns	76	73	.510	16	40‍–‍34	36‍–‍39
Detroit Tigers	71	78	.477	21	42‍–‍34	29‍–‍44
Washington Senators	55	95	.367	37½	33‍–‍41	22‍–‍54
Boston Americans	49	105	.318	45½	22‍–‍54	27‍–‍51

=== Record vs. opponents ===
1906 American League record Sources:
Team	BOS	CWS	CLE	DET	NYH	PHA	SLB	WSH
Boston	—	4–18	8–14	10–12	5–17–1	8–14	5–17	9–13
Chicago	18–4	—	12–10–1	11–11	12–10–1	12–9	13–7–1	15–7
Cleveland	8–14	10–12–1	—	14–8–1	10–11–1	12–10–1	14–8	15–7
Detroit	12–10	11–11	8–14–1	—	11–11	6–13	9–13–1	14–6
New York	17–5–1	10–12–1	11–10–1	11–11	—	13–8	13–8–1	15–7
Philadelphia	14–8	9–12	10–12–1	13–6	8–13	—	9–11–2	15–5–1
St. Louis	17–5	7–13–1	8–14	13–9–1	8–13–1	11–9–2	—	12–10
Washington	13–9	7–15	7–15	6–14	7–15	5–15–1	10–12	—

=== Roster ===
1906 Philadelphia Athletics
Roster
Pitchers: Bill Bartley; Chief Bender; Andy Coakley; Jack Coombs; Mike Cunningham; Jimmy Dygert; Jim Holmes; Eddie Plank; Hack Schumann; Rube Waddell	Catchers: Claude Berry; Jim Byrnes; Doc Powers; Ossee Schreckengost; Infielders: Art Brouthers; Eddie Collins; Monte Cross; Harry Davis; John Knight; Ed Lennox; Danny Murphy; Simon Nicholls; Rube Oldring; Dave Shean	Outfielders: Harry Armbruster; Topsy Hartsel; Danny Hoffman; Bris Lord; Socks Seybold; Other positions: Willy Fetzer; Jack Hannifin	Manager: Connie Mack

== Post Season ==
The Athletics played a series of exhibition games following the season. On October 11, 1906, Eddie Plank and the Athletics faced the Philadelphia Giants with future Hall of Famer Pete Hill at Seaboard Park in Chester, Pennsylvania. The Athletics, down two runs in the ninth, came back to score three and win 5 to 4 to win. Rube Waddel served as the game's umpire.

== Player stats ==
=== Batting ===
==== Starters by position ====
Note: Pos = Position; G = Games played; AB = At bats; H = Hits; Avg. = Batting average; HR = Home runs; RBI = Runs batted in

Pos	Player	G	AB	H	Avg.	HR	RBI
C	Ossee Schreckengost	98	338	96	.284	1	41
1B	Harry Davis	145	551	161	.292	12	96
2B	Danny Murphy	119	448	135	.301	2	60
SS	Monte Cross	134	445	89	.200	1	40
3B	John Knight	74	253	49	.194	3	20
OF	Topsy Hartsel	144	533	136	.255	1	30
OF	Bris Lord	118	434	101	.233	1	44
OF	Socks Seybold	116	411	130	.316	5	59

==== Other batters ====
Note: G = Games played; AB = At bats; H = Hits; Avg. = Batting average; HR = Home runs; RBI = Runs batted in

Player	G	AB	H	Avg.	HR	RBI
Harry Armbruster	91	265	63	.238	2	24
Doc Powers	58	185	29	.157	0	7
Rube Oldring	59	174	42	.241	0	19
Art Brouthers	37	144	30	.208	0	14
Dave Shean	22	75	16	.213	0	3
Simon Nicholls	12	44	8	.182	0	1
Claude Berry	10	30	7	.233	0	2
Jim Byrnes	10	23	4	.174	0	0
Danny Hoffman	7	22	5	.227	0	1
Ed Lennox	6	17	1	.059	0	0
Eddie Collins	6	15	3	.200	0	0
Willy Fetzer	1	1	0	.000	0	0
Jack Hannifin	1	1	1	1.000	0	0

=== Pitching ===
==== Starting pitchers ====
Note: G = Games pitched; IP = Innings pitched; W = Wins; L = Losses; ERA = Earned run average; SO = Strikeouts

Player	G	IP	W	L	ERA	SO
Rube Waddell	43	272.2	15	17	2.21	196
Chief Bender	36	238.1	15	10	2.53	159
Jimmy Dygert	35	213.2	11	13	2.70	106
Eddie Plank	26	211.2	19	6	2.25	108
Jack Coombs	23	173.0	10	10	2.50	90
Andy Coakley	22	149.0	7	8	3.14	59

==== Other pitchers ====
Note: G = Games pitched; IP = Innings pitched; W = Wins; L = Losses; ERA = Earned run average; SO = Strikeouts

Player	G	IP	W	L	ERA	SO
Mike Cunningham	5	28.0	1	0	3.21	15
Hack Schumann	4	18.0	0	2	4.00	9
Jim Holmes	3	9.0	0	1	4.00	1

==== Relief pitchers ====
Note: G = Games pitched; W = Wins; L = Losses; SV = Saves; ERA = Earned run average; SO = Strikeouts

Player	G	W	L	SV	ERA	SO
Bill Bartley	3	0	0	1	9.35	6
