= 1906 Chicago White Sox season =

1906 Chicago White Sox
- World Series champions American League champions
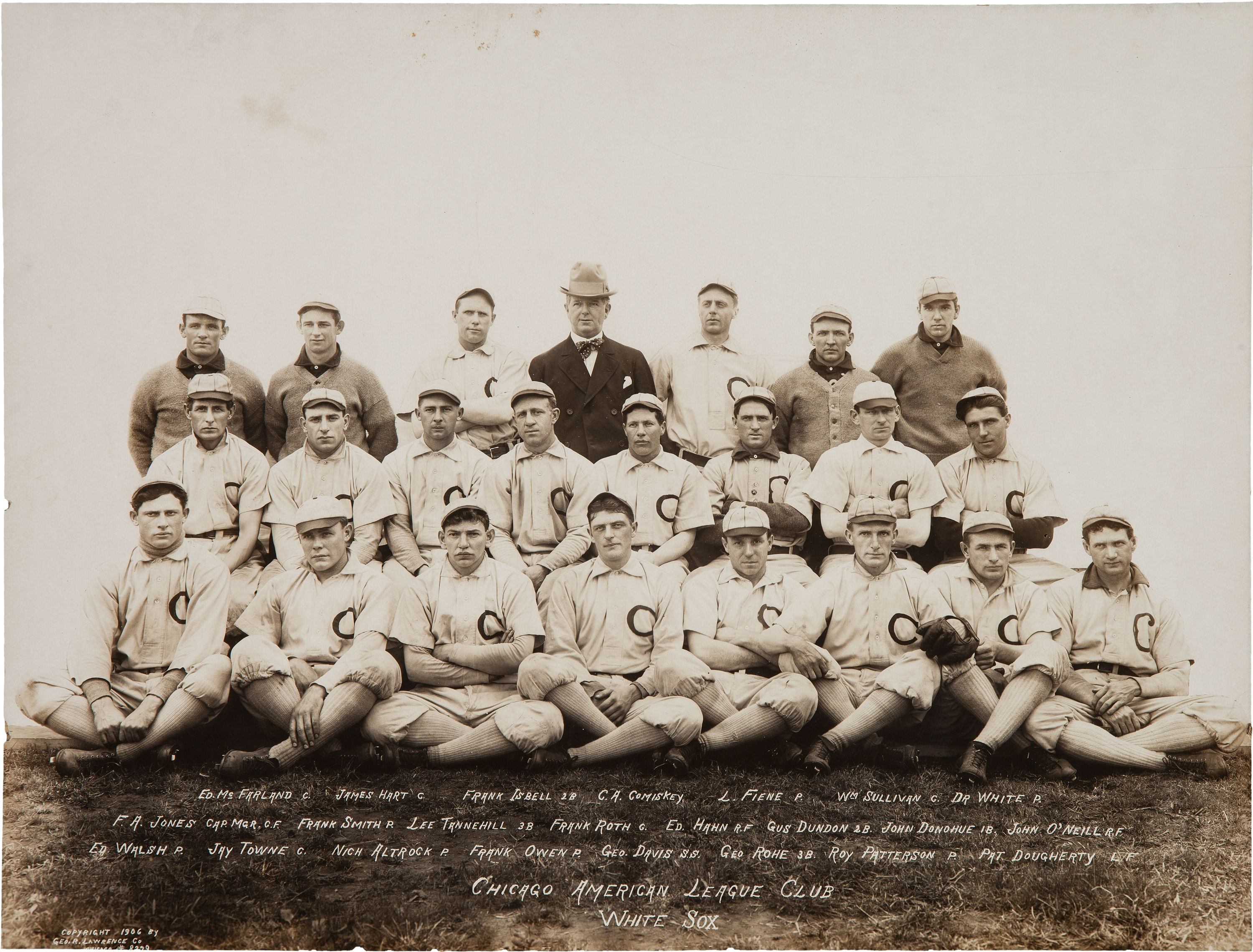
- League: American League
- Ballpark: South Side Park
- City: Chicago, Illinois
- Record: 93–58 (.616)
- League place: 1st
- Owners: Charles Comiskey
- Managers: Fielder Jones

The 1906 season was the seventh season overall for the Chicago White Sox, and their sixth season in the major leagues. The Sox won their second American League pennant and their first World Series championship.

The Sox won 93 games in the regular season–– a plateau they would not reach again until the 1915 season–– to claim the pennant, propelled by a historic 19-game winning streak in August. They won the league pennant largely on the strength of their pitching staff, as their team batting average of .230 was the worst in the AL. The White Sox would go on to upset their crosstown neighbors, the Chicago Cubs (who had finished 116–36 that year for the best winning percentage in modern baseball history), in the World Series, earning them the moniker of the "Hitless Wonders."

== Regular season ==
The 1906 White Sox team became known as the Hitless Wonders, having won the American League pennant despite posting the lowest team batting average (.230) in the league. The team had been in fourth place by the end of July, 7½ games behind the defending champion Philadelphia Athletics, when they went on a 19-game winning streak that drove them into first place. No American League team would beat the 19-game winning streak for almost 100 years. The team made up for their lack of hitting prowess by leading the league in walks, hit batsmen and sacrifice hits. The White Sox pitching staff had a league-leading 32 shutouts and the second lowest earned run average in the league. The White Sox then defeated their cross-town rivals, the heavily favored Chicago Cubs in the 1906 World Series.

=== Season standings ===
American League
Team	W	L	Pct.	GB	Home	Road
Chicago White Sox	93	58	.616	—	54‍–‍23	39‍–‍35
New York Highlanders	90	61	.596	3	53‍–‍23	37‍–‍38
Cleveland Naps	89	64	.582	5	47‍–‍30	42‍–‍34
Philadelphia Athletics	78	67	.538	12	48‍–‍23	30‍–‍44
St. Louis Browns	76	73	.510	16	40‍–‍34	36‍–‍39
Detroit Tigers	71	78	.477	21	42‍–‍34	29‍–‍44
Washington Senators	55	95	.367	37½	33‍–‍41	22‍–‍54
Boston Americans	49	105	.318	45½	22‍–‍54	27‍–‍51

=== Record vs. opponents ===
1906 American League record Sources:
Team	BOS	CWS	CLE	DET	NYH	PHA	SLB	WSH
Boston	—	4–18	8–14	10–12	5–17–1	8–14	5–17	9–13
Chicago	18–4	—	12–10–1	11–11	12–10–1	12–9	13–7–1	15–7
Cleveland	8–14	10–12–1	—	14–8–1	10–11–1	12–10–1	14–8	15–7
Detroit	12–10	11–11	8–14–1	—	11–11	6–13	9–13–1	14–6
New York	17–5–1	10–12–1	11–10–1	11–11	—	13–8	13–8–1	15–7
Philadelphia	14–8	9–12	10–12–1	13–6	8–13	—	9–11–2	15–5–1
St. Louis	17–5	7–13–1	8–14	13–9–1	8–13–1	11–9–2	—	12–10
Washington	13–9	7–15	7–15	6–14	7–15	5–15–1	10–12	—

=== Roster ===
1906 Chicago White Sox
Roster
Pitchers: Nick Altrock; Lou Fiene; Frank Owen; Roy Patterson; Frank Smith; Ed Walsh; Doc White	Catchers: Hub Hart; Ed McFarland; Frank Roth; Billy Sullivan; Babe Towne; Infielders: George Davis; Jiggs Donahue; Gus Dundon; Frank Isbell; Lee Quillen; George Rohe; Lee Tannehill	Outfielders: Patsy Dougherty; Ed Hahn; Frank Hemphill; Fielder Jones; Bill O'Neill; Rube Vinson	Manager: Fielder Jones

== Player stats ==
= Indicates team leader

=== Batting ===
==== Starters by position ====
Note: Pos = Position; G = Games played; AB = At bats; H = Hits; Avg. = Batting average; HR = Home runs; RBI = Runs batted in

Pos	Player	G	AB	H	Avg.	HR	RBI
C	Billy Sullivan	118	387	83	.214	2	33
1B	Jiggs Donahue	154	556	143	.257	1	57
2B	Frank Isbell	143	549	153	.279	0	57
SS	George Davis	133	484	134	.277	0	80
3B	Lee Tannehill	116	378	69	.183	0	33
OF	Ed Hahn	130	484	110	.227	0	27
OF	Fielder Jones	144	496	114	.230	2	34
OF	Bill O'Neill	94	330	82	.248	1	21

==== Other batters ====
Note: G = Games played; AB = At bats; H = Hits; Avg. = Batting average; HR = Home runs; RBI = Runs batted in

Player	G	AB	H	Avg.	HR	RBI
Patsy Dougherty	75	253	59	.233	1	27
George Rohe	77	225	58	.258	0	25
Gus Dundon	33	96	13	.135	0	4
Frank Roth	16	51	10	.196	0	7
Frank Hemphill	13	40	3	.075	0	2
Hub Hart	17	37	6	.162	0	0
Babe Towne	14	36	10	.278	0	6
Rube Vinson	10	24	6	.250	0	3
Ed McFarland	12	23	4	.174	0	3
Lee Quillen	4	9	3	.333	0	0

=== Pitching ===
==== Starting pitchers ====
Note: G = Games pitched; IP = Innings pitched; W = Wins; L = Losses; ERA = Earned run average; SO = Strikeouts

Player	G	IP	W	L	ERA	SO
Frank Owen	42	293.0	22	13	2.33	66
Nick Altrock	38	287.2	20	13	2.06	99
Ed Walsh	41	278.1	17	13	1.88	171
Doc White	28	219.1	18	6	1.52	95
Roy Patterson	21	142.0	10	7	2.09	45

==== Other pitchers ====
Note: G = Games pitched; IP = Innings pitched; W = Wins; L = Losses; ERA = Earned run average; SO = Strikeouts

Player	G	IP	W	L	ERA	SO
Frank Smith	20	122.0	5	5	3.39	53
Lou Fiene	6	31.0	1	1	2.90	12

==== Relief pitchers ====
Note: G = Games pitched; W = Wins; L = Losses; SV = Saves; ERA = Earned run average; SO = Strikeouts

Player	G	W	L	SV	ERA	SO
Frank Isbell	1	0	0	0	0.00	2

== 1906 World Series ==
AL Chicago White Sox (4) vs NL Chicago Cubs (2)

Game	Score	Date	Location	Attendance
1	White Sox – 2, Cubs – 1	October 9	West Side Park	12,693
2	Cubs – 7, White Sox – 1	October 10	South Side Park	12,595
3	White Sox – 3, Cubs – 0	October 11	West Side Park	13,667
4	Cubs – 1, White Sox – 0	October 12	South Side Park	18,385
5	White Sox – 8, Cubs – 6	October 13	West Side Park	23,257
6	Cubs – 3, White Sox – 8	October 14	South Side Park	19,249
