= 1906 Washington Senators season =

1906 Washington Senators
- League: American League
- Ballpark: National Park
- City: Washington, D.C.
- Record: 55–95 (.367)
- League place: 7th
- Owners: Thomas C. Noyes
- Managers: Jake Stahl

The 1906 Washington Senators won 55 games, lost 95, and finished in seventh place in the American League. They were managed by Jake Stahl and played home games at National Park.

== Regular season ==
Shortstop Joe Cassidy died in March 1906 due to complications from typhoid and malaria. The Senators opened their 1906 season against the Philadelphia Athletics at Columbia Park in Philadelphia. The Senators, according to the Philadelphia Inquirer "wore on [their] sleeve a badge of mourning as a tribute to the memory of Shortstop Joe Cassidy."

=== Season standings ===
American League
Team	W	L	Pct.	GB	Home	Road
Chicago White Sox	93	58	.616	—	54‍–‍23	39‍–‍35
New York Highlanders	90	61	.596	3	53‍–‍23	37‍–‍38
Cleveland Naps	89	64	.582	5	47‍–‍30	42‍–‍34
Philadelphia Athletics	78	67	.538	12	48‍–‍23	30‍–‍44
St. Louis Browns	76	73	.510	16	40‍–‍34	36‍–‍39
Detroit Tigers	71	78	.477	21	42‍–‍34	29‍–‍44
Washington Senators	55	95	.367	37½	33‍–‍41	22‍–‍54
Boston Americans	49	105	.318	45½	22‍–‍54	27‍–‍51

=== Record vs. opponents ===
1906 American League record Sources:
Team	BOS	CWS	CLE	DET	NYH	PHA	SLB	WSH
Boston	—	4–18	8–14	10–12	5–17–1	8–14	5–17	9–13
Chicago	18–4	—	12–10–1	11–11	12–10–1	12–9	13–7–1	15–7
Cleveland	8–14	10–12–1	—	14–8–1	10–11–1	12–10–1	14–8	15–7
Detroit	12–10	11–11	8–14–1	—	11–11	6–13	9–13–1	14–6
New York	17–5–1	10–12–1	11–10–1	11–11	—	13–8	13–8–1	15–7
Philadelphia	14–8	9–12	10–12–1	13–6	8–13	—	9–11–2	15–5–1
St. Louis	17–5	7–13–1	8–14	13–9–1	8–13–1	11–9–2	—	12–10
Washington	13–9	7–15	7–15	6–14	7–15	5–15–1	10–12	—

=== Roster ===
1906 Washington Senators
Roster
Pitchers: Bob Edmundson; Cy Falkenberg; Clyde Goodwin; Harry Hardy; Tom Hughes; Frank Kitson; Casey Patten; Charlie Smith; Con Starkel; Willie Sudhoff; Willy Wilson; Barney Wolfe	Catchers: Mike Heydon; Malachi Kittridge; Howard Wakefield; Jack Warner; Infielders: Dave Altizer; Lave Cross; Rabbit Nill; Larry Schlafly; Warren Shanabrook; Jake Stahl; Otto Williams	Outfielders: John Anderson; Charlie Hickman; Charlie Jones; Joe Stanley; Other batters: Pat Duff	Manager: Jake Stahl

== Player stats ==
=== Batting ===
==== Starters by position ====
Note: Pos = Position; G = Games played; AB = At bats; H = Hits; Avg. = Batting average; HR = Home runs; RBI = Runs batted in

Pos	Player	G	AB	H	Avg.	HR	RBI
C	Howard Wakefield	77	211	59	.280	1	21
1B	Jake Stahl	137	482	107	.222	0	51
2B	Larry Schlafly	123	426	105	.246	2	30
SS	Dave Altizer	115	433	111	.256	1	27
3B	Lave Cross	130	494	130	.263	1	46
OF	Charlie Jones	131	497	120	.241	3	42
OF	John Anderson	151	583	158	.271	3	70
OF	Charlie Hickman	120	451	128	.284	9	57

==== Other batters ====
Note: G = Games played; AB = At bats; H = Hits; Avg. = Batting average; HR = Home runs; RBI = Runs batted in

Player	G	AB	H	Avg.	HR	RBI
Rabbit Nill	89	315	74	.235	0	15
Joe Stanley	73	221	36	.163	0	9
Mike Heydon	49	145	23	.159	0	10
Jack Warner	32	103	21	.204	1	9
Malachi Kittridge	22	68	13	.191	0	3
Otto Williams	20	51	7	.137	0	2
Warren Shanabrook	1	2	0	.000	0	0
Pat Duff	1	1	0	.000	0	0

=== Pitching ===
==== Starting pitchers ====
Note: G = Games pitched; IP = Innings pitched; W = Wins; L = Losses; ERA = Earned run average; SO = Strikeouts

Player	G	IP	W	L	ERA	SO
Cy Falkenberg	40	298.2	14	20	2.86	178
Casey Patten	38	282.2	19	16	2.17	96
Tom Hughes	30	204.0	7	17	3.62	90
Frank Kitson	30	197.0	6	14	3.65	59
Clyde Goodwin	4	22.1	0	2	4.43	9
Barney Wolfe	4	20.0	0	3	4.05	8
Willy Wilson	1	7.0	0	1	2.57	1

==== Other pitchers ====
Note: G = Games pitched; IP = Innings pitched; W = Wins; L = Losses; ERA = Earned run average; SO = Strikeouts

Player	G	IP	W	L	ERA	SO
Charlie Smith	33	235.1	9	16	2.91	105
Harry Hardy	5	20.0	0	3	9.00	4
Willie Sudhoff	9	19.2	0	2	9.15	7
Bob Edmundson	2	10.0	0	1	4.50	0

==== Relief pitchers ====
Note: G = Games pitched; W = Wins; L = Losses; SV = Saves; ERA = Earned run average; SO = Strikeouts

Player	G	W	L	SV	ERA	SO
Con Starkel	1	0	0	0	18.00	1
Joe Stanley	1	0	0	0	12.00	0
