= 1907 Chicago White Sox season =

1907 Chicago White Sox
- League: American League
- Ballpark: South Side Park
- City: Chicago, Illinois
- Record: 87–64 (.576)
- League place: 3rd
- Owners: Charles Comiskey
- Managers: Fielder Jones

The 1907 Chicago White Sox led the American League for much of the first half but finished third.

Chicago allowed the fewest runs in the AL. The pitching staff was led by Ed Walsh, who paced the circuit in innings pitched (422.1), complete games (37), and earned run average (1.60).

== Regular season ==
=== Season standings ===
American League
Team	W	L	Pct.	GB	Home	Road
Detroit Tigers	92	58	.613	—	50‍–‍27	42‍–‍31
Philadelphia Athletics	88	57	.607	1½	50‍–‍20	38‍–‍37
Chicago White Sox	87	64	.576	5½	48‍–‍29	39‍–‍35
Cleveland Naps	85	67	.559	8	46‍–‍31	39‍–‍36
New York Highlanders	70	78	.473	21	32‍–‍41	38‍–‍37
St. Louis Browns	69	83	.454	24	36‍–‍40	33‍–‍43
Boston Americans	59	90	.396	32½	34‍–‍41	25‍–‍49
Washington Senators	49	102	.325	43½	26‍–‍48	23‍–‍54

=== Record vs. opponents ===
1907 American League record Sources:
Team	BOS	CWS	CLE	DET	NYH	PHA	SLB	WSH
Boston	—	10–11–3	8–13	6–16	8–12–1	8–14–2	10–12	9–12
Chicago	11–10–3	—	10–11–1	13–9–1	12–10	10–12–1	16–6	15–6
Cleveland	13–8	11–10–1	—	11–11–1	15–7	8–14	12–10–2	15–7–2
Detroit	16–6	9–13–1	11–11–1	—	13–8	11–8–1	14–8	18–4
New York	12–8–1	10–12	7–15	8–13	—	10–9–1	8–14–1	15–7–1
Philadelphia	14–8–2	12–10–1	14–8	8–11–1	9–10–1	—	14–6	17–4
St. Louis	12–10	6–16	10–12–2	8–14	14–8–1	6–14	—	13–9
Washington	12–9	6–15	7–15–2	4–18	7–15–1	4–17	9–13	—

=== Roster ===
1907 Chicago White Sox
Roster
Pitchers: Nick Altrock; Lou Fiene; Frank Owen; Roy Patterson; Frank Smith; Ed Walsh; Doc White	Catchers: Charlie Armbruster; Hub Hart; Ed McFarland; Billy Sullivan; Infielders: Jake Atz; George Davis; Jiggs Donahue; Frank Isbell; Lee Quillen; George Rohe; Lee Tannehill	Outfielders: Patsy Dougherty; Ed Hahn; Charlie Hickman; Fielder Jones; Mike Welday	Manager: Fielder Jones

== Player stats ==
=== Batting ===
==== Starters by position ====
Note: Pos = Position; G = Games played; AB = At bats; H = Hits; Avg. = Batting average; HR = Home runs; RBI = Runs batted in

Pos	Player	G	AB	H	Avg.	HR	RBI
C	Billy Sullivan	112	329	59	.179	0	36
1B	Jiggs Donahue	157	609	158	.259	0	68
2B	Frank Isbell	125	486	118	.243	0	41
SS	George Davis	132	466	111	.238	1	52
3B	George Rohe	144	494	105	.213	2	51
OF	Ed Hahn	156	592	151	.255	0	45
OF	Patsy Dougherty	148	533	144	.270	1	59
OF	Fielder Jones	154	559	146	.261	0	47

==== Other batters ====
Note: G = Games played; AB = At bats; H = Hits; Avg. = Batting average; HR = Home runs; RBI = Runs batted in

Player	G	AB	H	Avg.	HR	RBI
Lee Quillen	49	151	29	.192	0	14
Ed McFarland	52	138	39	.283	0	8
Lee Tannehill	33	108	26	.241	0	11
Hub Hart	29	70	19	.271	0	7
Mike Welday	44	35	8	.229	0	0
Charlie Hickman	21	23	6	.261	0	1
Jake Atz	4	8	1	.125	0	0
Charlie Armbruster	1	3	0	.000	0	0

=== Pitching ===
==== Starting pitchers ====
Note: G = Games pitched; IP = Innings pitched; W = Wins; L = Losses; ERA = Earned run average; SO = Strikeouts

Player	G	IP	W	L	ERA	SO
Ed Walsh	56	422.1	24	18	1.60	206
Frank Smith	41	310.0	23	10	2.47	139
Doc White	46	291.0	27	13	2.26	141
Nick Altrock	30	213.2	7	13	2.57	61
Roy Patterson	19	96.0	4	6	2.63	27

==== Other pitchers ====
Note: G = Games pitched; IP = Innings pitched; W = Wins; L = Losses; ERA = Earned run average; SO = Strikeouts

Player	G	IP	W	L	ERA	SO
Frank Owen	11	47.0	2	3	2.49	15
Lou Fiene	6	26.0	0	1	4.15	15

==== Relief pitchers ====
Note: G = Games pitched; W = Wins; L = Losses; SV = Saves; ERA = Earned run average; SO = Strikeouts

Player	G	W	L	SV	ERA	SO
Frank Isbell	1	0	0	0	0.00	0

== Awards and honors ==
=== League top five finishers ===
Ed Walsh

- AL leader in ERA (1.60)
- #2 in AL in strikeouts (206)

Doc White

- AL leader in wins (27)
