= Harry Armbruster =

American baseball player (1882-1953)

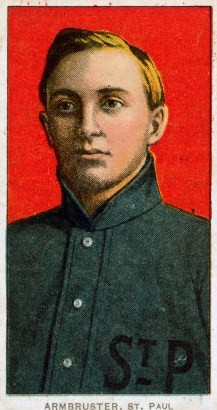
- A 1909 baseball card of Armbruster.
- Outfielder
- Born: March 20, 1882; Valley City, Ohio, U.S.
- Died: December 10, 1953 (aged 71); Cincinnati, Ohio, U.S.
- Batted: Left Threw: Left

MLB debut
- April 30, 1906, for the Philadelphia Athletics

Last MLB appearance
- October 3, 1906, for the Philadelphia Athletics

MLB statistics
- Batting average: .238
- Home runs: 2
- Runs batted in: 24
- Stats at Baseball Reference

Teams
- Philadelphia Athletics (1906)

Henry Gregory "Harry" Armbruster (March 20, 1882 – December 10, 1953), also known as "Army" Armbruster, was an American professional baseball player whose career spanned 10 seasons, including one in Major League Baseball. During that one season, which was in 1906, Armbruster played with the Philadelphia Athletics. Armbruster, an outfielder, compiled a major league batting average of .238 with 40 runs, 63 hits, six doubles, three triples, two home runs, 24 runs batted in (RBIs) and 13 stolen bases in 91 games played. Armbruster also played in the minor leagues with the Class-A Providence Grays; the Class-B Manchester, New Hampshire, baseball team; the Class-B Lawrence Colts; the Class-A Toledo Mud Hens; the Class-A St. Paul Saints; and the Class-B Syracuse Stars. In the minors, Armbruster compiled a batting average .292 with 1,159 hits in 1,101 games played.

== Professional career ==
Armbruster began his professional baseball career in 1902 with the Providence Grays of the Class-A Eastern League. That season, he batted .253 with 62 hits and eight doubles in 67 games played. In 1903, Armbruster continued playing with the Providence team. On the season, he batted .257 with 68 runs, 120 hits, 14 doubles, five triples, two home runs and 20 stolen bases in 131 games played. During the 1904 season, Armbruster played for two teams; the Grays, who he had played with for the past two seasons, and the Class-B Manchester, New Hampshire based, Manchester baseball team. With Providence, he batted .272 with 41 hits, two doubles and one triple in 45 games played. In 48 games with the Manchester team, Armbruster batted .362 with 63 hits, two doubles and seven triples. As a member of the Manchester club, Armbruster's batting average was second amongst batters in the New England League. During the 1905 season, Armbruster split the season between the Manchester club and the Lawrence Colts, both of the New England League. Between the two teams, he batted .339 with 134 hits in 107 games played. Armbruster led the New England League in hits and was second in batting average.

Armbruster signed with the Philadelphia Athletics in February 1906. He joined the team for spring training in Birmingham, Alabama, that season. Armbruster was used a replacement for Danny Hoffman who was traded to the New York Highlanders for the rights to negotiate with outfielder Dave Fultz. Fultz and Athletics manager Connie Mack never reached an agreement. Armbruster was scheduled assigned to the Newark minor league team for the start of the season; however, Mack added him to the major league roster before he appeared in a game. He made his debut in Major League Baseball on April 30, 1906. On June 23, against pitcher Joe Harris, Armbruster hit his first major league home run. He primarily played center field as a member of the Athletics. During the season, he compiled a batting average of .238 with 40 runs, 63 hits, six doubles, three triples, two home runs, 24 runs batted in and 13 stolen bases in 91 games played. On defense, he played a total of 74 games in the outfield, committing four errors in 137 total chances.

After the 1906 season, Armbruster was released by the Philadelphia Athletics and joined the Toledo Mud Hens of the Class-A American Association for the 1907 season. During that season, Sporting Life described Armbruster as the "best outfielder and hitter in the American Association". In September, Armbruster was sidelined with an injury. With the Mud Hens, Armbruster batted .322 with 161 hits, 32 doubles, eight hits and five home runs in 133 games played. He was seventh in the league in doubles and eight in batting average. In 1908, he continued playing for the Mud Hens and batted .272 with 148 hits, 37 doubles, five triples and one home run in 148 games played. That season, he was third in the American Association in doubles.

Before the 1909 season, the Class-A St. Paul Saints of the American Association offered to trade third baseman Eddie Tiemeyer to the Toledo Mud Hens in exchange for Armbruster, but the deal was declined. Toledo later sold Armbruster to the St. Paul club for US$1,000. In 148 games played that season, he batted .283 with 154 hits, 33 doubles, two triples and two home runs. Amongst league batters that season, Armbruster was fifth in doubles and eight in batting average. In 1910, he joined the Syracuse Stars of the Class-B New York State League. That season, Armbruster batted .302 with 137 hits in 133 games played. Amongst league batters, he was ninth in batting average and tenth in hits. Armbruster spent his final season in professional baseball with the Stars in 1911. That season, he batted .284 with 139 hits in 141 games played. Hit hits total ranked sixth in the league.

== Later life ==
After retiring from professional baseball, Armbruster found work as a machinist.

== Personal ==
Armbruster was born on March 20, 1882, in Liverpool, Ohio, which is now known as Valley City, Ohio. He married Carrie Frenke, of Cincinnati on February 6, 1906. Armbruster died on December 10, 1953, in Cincinnati, Ohio and was buried at St. John Cemetery, Cincinnati.
