= 1906 New York Highlanders season =

Baseball team season

1906 New York Highlanders
- League: American League
- Ballpark: Hilltop Park
- City: New York, New York
- Record: 90–61 (.596)
- League place: 2nd
- Owners: William Devery and Frank Farrell
- Managers: Clark Griffith

The 1906 New York Highlanders season, its fourth, finished with the team in second place in the American League with a record of 90–61. The team was managed by Clark Griffith and played its home games at Hilltop Park.

== Regular season ==
=== Season standings ===
American League
Team	W	L	Pct.	GB	Home	Road
Chicago White Sox	93	58	.616	—	54‍–‍23	39‍–‍35
New York Highlanders	90	61	.596	3	53‍–‍23	37‍–‍38
Cleveland Naps	89	64	.582	5	47‍–‍30	42‍–‍34
Philadelphia Athletics	78	67	.538	12	48‍–‍23	30‍–‍44
St. Louis Browns	76	73	.510	16	40‍–‍34	36‍–‍39
Detroit Tigers	71	78	.477	21	42‍–‍34	29‍–‍44
Washington Senators	55	95	.367	37½	33‍–‍41	22‍–‍54
Boston Americans	49	105	.318	45½	22‍–‍54	27‍–‍51

=== Record vs. opponents ===
1906 American League record Sources:
Team	BOS	CWS	CLE	DET	NYH	PHA	SLB	WSH
Boston	—	4–18	8–14	10–12	5–17–1	8–14	5–17	9–13
Chicago	18–4	—	12–10–1	11–11	12–10–1	12–9	13–7–1	15–7
Cleveland	8–14	10–12–1	—	14–8–1	10–11–1	12–10–1	14–8	15–7
Detroit	12–10	11–11	8–14–1	—	11–11	6–13	9–13–1	14–6
New York	17–5–1	10–12–1	11–10–1	11–11	—	13–8	13–8–1	15–7
Philadelphia	14–8	9–12	10–12–1	13–6	8–13	—	9–11–2	15–5–1
St. Louis	17–5	7–13–1	8–14	13–9–1	8–13–1	11–9–2	—	12–10
Washington	13–9	7–15	7–15	6–14	7–15	5–15–1	10–12	—

=== Roster ===
1906 New York Highlanders
Roster
Pitchers: Cy Barger; Jack Chesbro; Walter Clarkson; Slow Joe Doyle; Clark Griffith; Noodles Hahn; Bill Hogg; Tom Hughes; Louis Leroy; Doc Newton; Al Orth	Catchers: Red Kleinow; Deacon McGuire; Ira Thomas; Infielders: Hal Chase; Kid Elberfeld; Frank LaPorte; George Moriarty; Jimmy Williams; Joe Yeager	Outfielders: Wid Conroy; Frank Delahanty; Patsy Dougherty; Ed Hahn; Danny Hoffman; Willie Keeler	Manager: Clark Griffith

== Player stats ==
=== Batting ===
==== Starters by position ====
Note: Pos = Position; G = Games played; AB = At bats; H = Hits; Avg. = Batting average; HR = Home runs; RBI = Runs batted in

Pos	Player	G	AB	H	Avg.	HR	RBI
C	Red Kleinow	96	268	59	.220	0	31
1B	Hal Chase	151	597	193	.323	0	76
2B	Jimmy Williams	139	501	139	.277	3	77
SS	Kid Elberfeld	99	346	106	.306	2	31
3B	Frank LaPorte	123	454	120	.264	2	54
OF	Frank Delahanty	92	307	73	.238	2	41
OF	Wid Conroy	148	567	139	.245	4	54
OF	Willie Keeler	152	592	180	.304	2	33

==== Other batters ====
Note: G = Games played; AB = At bats; H = Hits; Avg. = Batting average; HR = Home runs; RBI = Runs batted in

Player	G	AB	H	Avg.	HR	RBI
Danny Hoffman	100	320	82	.256	0	23
George Moriarty	65	197	46	.234	0	23
Deacon McGuire	51	144	43	.299	0	14
Joe Yeager	57	123	37	.301	0	12
Ira Thomas	44	115	23	.200	0	15
Patsy Dougherty	12	52	10	.192	0	4
Ed Hahn	11	22	2	.091	0	1

=== Pitching ===
==== Starting pitchers ====
Note: G = Games pitched; IP = Innings pitched; W = Wins; L = Losses; ERA = Earned run average; SO = Strikeouts

Player	G	IP	W	L	ERA	SO
Al Orth	45	338.2	27	17	2.34	133
Jack Chesbro	49	325.0	23	17	2.96	152
Bill Hogg	28	206.0	14	13	2.93	107
Doc Newton	21	125.0	7	5	3.17	52
Noodles Hahn	6	42.0	3	2	3.86	17

==== Other pitchers ====
Note: G = Games pitched; IP = Innings pitched; W = Wins; L = Losses; ERA = Earned run average; SO = Strikeouts

Player	G	IP	W	L	ERA	SO
Walter Clarkson	32	151.0	9	4	2.32	64
Slow Joe Doyle	9	45.1	2	1	2.38	28
Tom Hughes	3	15.0	1	0	4.20	5
Cy Barger	2	5.1	0	0	10.12	3

==== Relief pitchers ====
Note: G = Games pitched; W = Wins; L = Losses; SV = Saves; ERA = Earned run average; SO = Strikeouts

Player	G	W	L	SV	ERA	SO
Clark Griffith	17	2	2	2	3.02	16
Louis Leroy	11	2	0	1	2.22	28
