= 1906 Boston Americans season =

Major League Baseball season

1906 Boston Americans
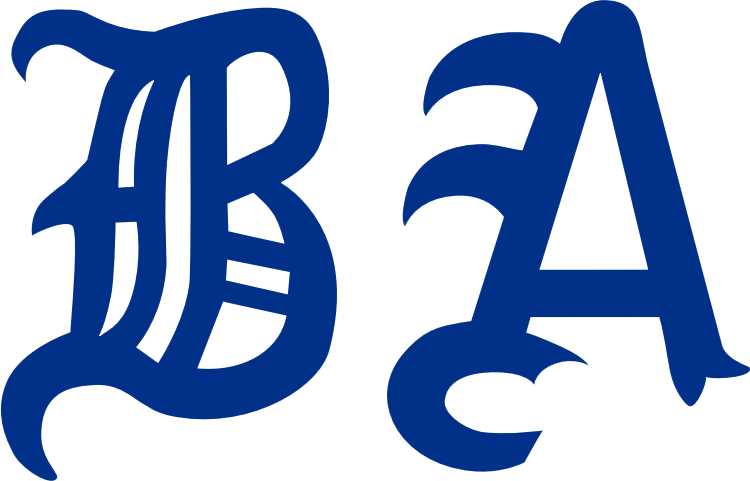
- League: American League
- Ballpark: Huntington Avenue Grounds
- City: Boston, Massachusetts
- Record: 49–105 (.318)
- League place: 8th
- Owners: John I. Taylor
- Managers: Jimmy Collins (35–79); Chick Stahl (14–26)
- Stats: ESPN.com; Baseball Reference

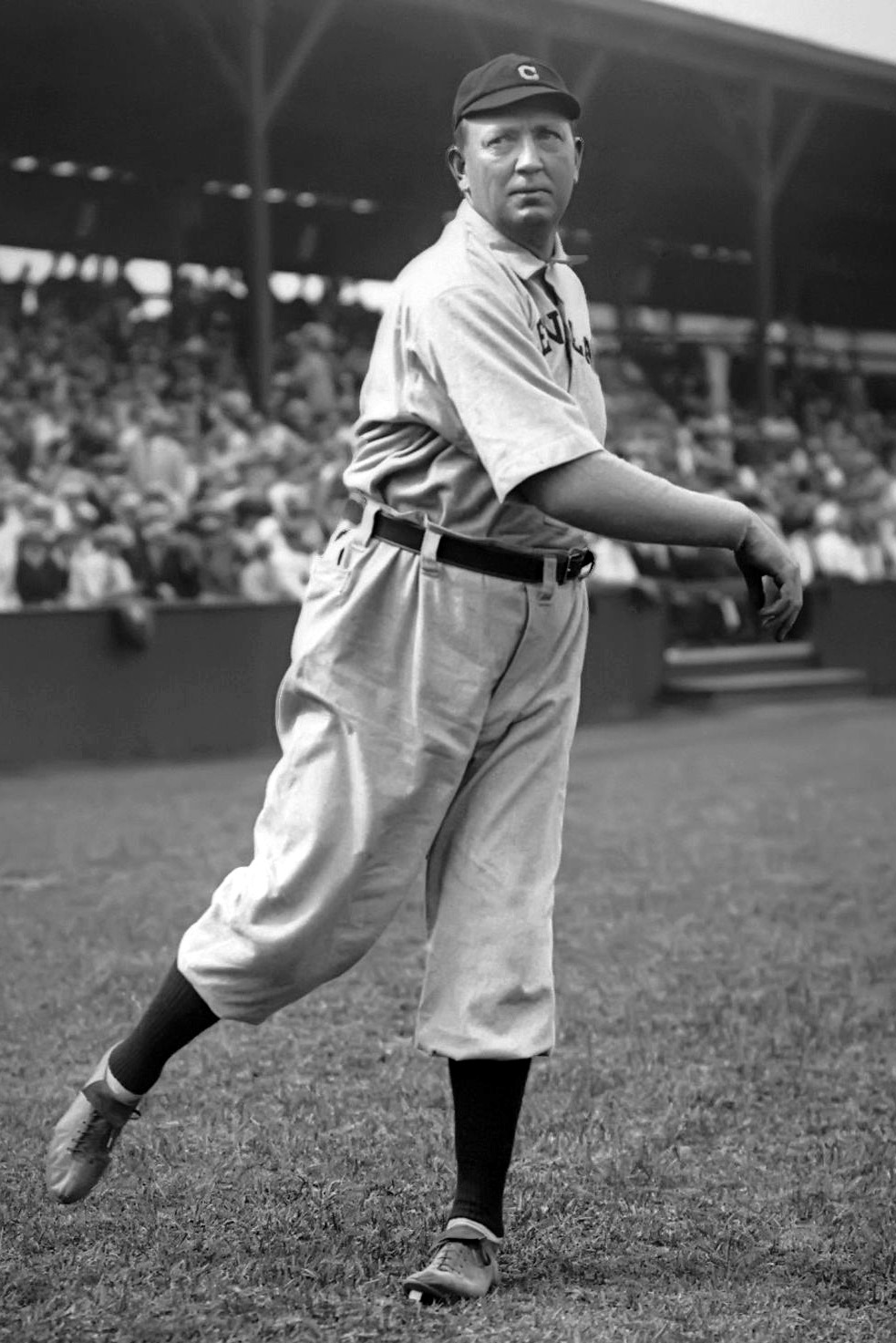
Opening Day starting pitcher Cy Young

The 1906 Boston Americans season was the sixth season for the professional baseball franchise that later became known as the Boston Red Sox. The Americans finished last in the eight-team American League (AL) with a record of 49 wins and 105 losses, 45 1/2 games behind the Chicago White Sox. The team played its home games at Huntington Avenue Grounds.

== Offseason ==
=== Transactions ===
- November 27, 1905: It is reported that Dartmouth pitcher Ralph Glaze will play for the Boston Americans.
- February 24, 1906: Catcher Frank "Yip" Owens is released by the Americans.

== Regular season ==
Prior to the regular season, the team held spring training in Macon, Georgia.

- April 14: The regular season opens with a 2–1 loss in 12 innings to the New York Highlanders at Hilltop Park in New York City.
- April 17: In the home opener, the Americans lose to the visiting Highlanders, 4–3.
- May 25: After losing their first 20 games of the month, during which their record went from 6–7 to 6–27, the Americans break their losing streak with a 3–0 win over the visiting Chicago White Sox.
- August 25: Jimmy Collins manages his final game. Although Boston defeat the St. Louis Browns, 3–1, the Americans are in last place in the AL, with a record of 35–79 (with one tie). Collins remains with the team as a player.
- August 27: Outfielder Chick Stahl manages his first game, a 6–5 loss to the Cleveland Naps.
- September 1: In their longest game of the season, the Americans lose to the visiting Philadelphia Athletics, 4–1 in 24 innings.
- September 26: The team loses its 100th game of the season, falling to 46–100 with a 2–0 loss to the White Sox at South Side Park in Chicago.
- October 6: The regular season ends with a home loss to the Highlanders, 5–4.

=== Statistical leaders ===
The offense was led by Chick Stahl with 51 RBIs and four home runs, and Myron "Moose" Grimshaw with a .290 batting average. The pitching staff was led by Cy Young, who made 39 appearances (34 starts) and pitched 28 complete games with a 13–21 record and 3.19 ERA, while striking out 140 in 287 2/3 innings. Jesse Tannehill was the only member of the starting rotation with winning record, at 13–11, while Bill Dinneen had the rotation's lowest ERA, at 2.92.

=== Season standings ===
American League
| Team | W | L | Pct. | GB | Home | Road |
|---|---|---|---|---|---|---|
| Chicago White Sox | 93 | 58 | .616 | — | 54‍–‍23 | 39‍–‍35 |
| New York Highlanders | 90 | 61 | .596 | 3 | 53‍–‍23 | 37‍–‍38 |
| Cleveland Naps | 89 | 64 | .582 | 5 | 47‍–‍30 | 42‍–‍34 |
| Philadelphia Athletics | 78 | 67 | .538 | 12 | 48‍–‍23 | 30‍–‍44 |
| St. Louis Browns | 76 | 73 | .510 | 16 | 40‍–‍34 | 36‍–‍39 |
| Detroit Tigers | 71 | 78 | .477 | 21 | 42‍–‍34 | 29‍–‍44 |
| Washington Senators | 55 | 95 | .367 | 37½ | 33‍–‍41 | 22‍–‍54 |
| Boston Americans | 49 | 105 | .318 | 45½ | 22‍–‍54 | 27‍–‍51 |

The team had one game end in a tie; April 18 vs. New York Highlanders. Tie games are not counted in league standings, but player statistics during tie games are counted.

=== Record vs. opponents ===
1906 American League record Sources:
| Team | BOS | CWS | CLE | DET | NYH | PHA | SLB | WSH |
|---|---|---|---|---|---|---|---|---|
| Boston | — | 4–18 | 8–14 | 10–12 | 5–17–1 | 8–14 | 5–17 | 9–13 |
| Chicago | 18–4 | — | 12–10–1 | 11–11 | 12–10–1 | 12–9 | 13–7–1 | 15–7 |
| Cleveland | 8–14 | 10–12–1 | — | 14–8–1 | 10–11–1 | 12–10–1 | 14–8 | 15–7 |
| Detroit | 12–10 | 11–11 | 8–14–1 | — | 11–11 | 6–13 | 9–13–1 | 14–6 |
| New York | 17–5–1 | 10–12–1 | 11–10–1 | 11–11 | — | 13–8 | 13–8–1 | 15–7 |
| Philadelphia | 14–8 | 9–12 | 10–12–1 | 13–6 | 8–13 | — | 9–11–2 | 15–5–1 |
| St. Louis | 17–5 | 7–13–1 | 8–14 | 13–9–1 | 8–13–1 | 11–9–2 | — | 12–10 |
| Washington | 13–9 | 7–15 | 7–15 | 6–14 | 7–15 | 5–15–1 | 10–12 | — |

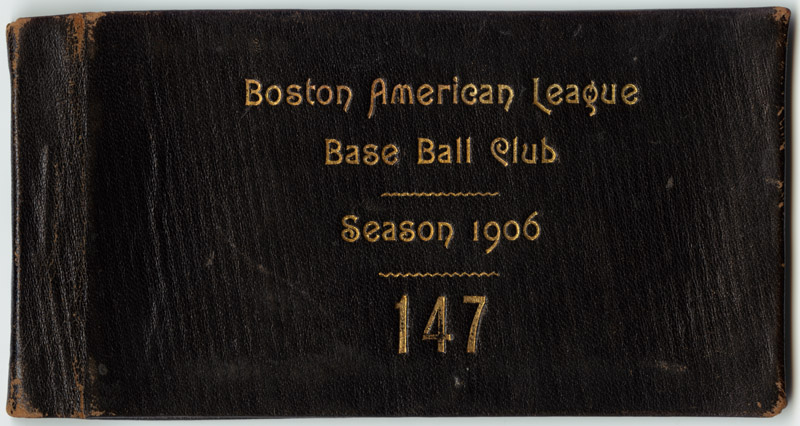
Season pass for 1906

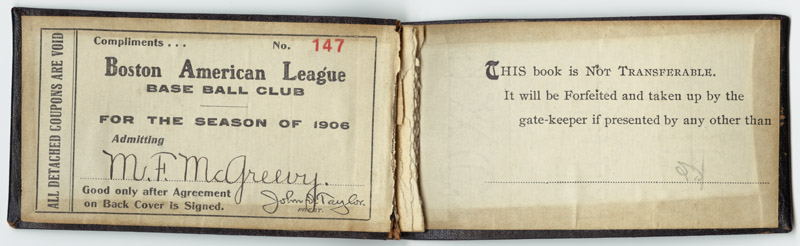
Inside view of the season pass

=== Opening Day lineup ===
| Kip Selbach | LF |
| Jimmy Collins | 3B |
| Chick Stahl | CF |
| Freddy Parent | SS |
| Buck Freeman | RF |
| Myron Grimshaw | 1B |
| John Godwin | 2B |
| Charlie Graham | C |
| Cy Young | P |

=== Roster ===
1906 Boston Americans
Roster
| Pitchers: Ed Barry; Bill Dinneen; Norwood Gibson; Ralph Glaze; Joe Harris; Ed Hughes; Rube Kroh; Frank Oberlin; Len Swormstedt; Jesse Tannehill; George Winter; Cy Young | Catchers: Charlie Armbruster; Bill Carrigan; Lou Criger; Tom Doran; Charlie Graham; Bob Peterson; Infielders: Chet Chadbourne; Jimmy Collins; Hobe Ferris; John Godwin; Myron Grimshaw; Red Morgan; Freddy Parent; Heinie Wagner | Outfielders: Buck Freeman; Jack Hayden; Jack Hoey; Kip Selbach; Chick Stahl | Manager: Jimmy Collins; Chick Stahl |

== Player stats ==
=== Batting ===
==== Starters by position ====
Note: Pos = Position; G = Games played; AB = At bats; H = Hits; Avg. = Batting average; HR = Home runs; RBI = Runs batted in

| Pos | Player | G | AB | H | Avg. | HR | RBI |
|---|---|---|---|---|---|---|---|
| C | Charlie Armbruster | 72 | 201 | 29 | .144 | 0 | 6 |
| 1B | Moose Grimshaw | 110 | 428 | 124 | .290 | 0 | 48 |
| 2B | Hobe Ferris | 130 | 495 | 121 | .244 | 2 | 44 |
| SS | Freddy Parent | 149 | 600 | 141 | .235 | 1 | 49 |
| 3B | Red Morgan | 88 | 307 | 66 | .215 | 1 | 21 |
| OF | Jack Hayden | 85 | 322 | 80 | .248 | 1 | 14 |
| OF | Chick Stahl | 155 | 595 | 170 | .286 | 4 | 51 |
| OF | Jack Hoey | 94 | 361 | 88 | .244 | 0 | 24 |

==== Other batters ====
Note: G = Games played; AB = At bats; H = Hits; Avg. = Batting average; HR = Home runs; RBI = Runs batted in

| Player | G | AB | H | Avg. | HR | RBI |
|---|---|---|---|---|---|---|
| Buck Freeman | 121 | 392 | 98 | .250 | 1 | 30 |
| Kip Selbach | 60 | 228 | 48 | .211 | 0 | 23 |
| John Godwin | 66 | 193 | 36 | .187 | 0 | 15 |
| Jimmy Collins | 37 | 142 | 39 | .275 | 1 | 16 |
| Bob Peterson | 39 | 118 | 24 | .203 | 1 | 9 |
| Bill Carrigan | 37 | 109 | 23 | .211 | 0 | 10 |
| Charlie Graham | 30 | 90 | 21 | .233 | 1 | 12 |
| Chet Chadbourne | 11 | 43 | 13 | .302 | 0 | 3 |
| Heinie Wagner | 9 | 32 | 9 | .281 | 0 | 4 |
| Lou Criger | 7 | 17 | 3 | .176 | 0 | 1 |
| Tom Doran | 2 | 3 | 0 | .000 | 0 | 0 |

=== Pitching ===
Note: G = Games pitched; IP = Innings pitched; W = Wins; L = Losses; ERA = Earned run average; SO = Strikeouts

==== Starting pitchers ====
| Player | G | IP | W | L | ERA | SO |
|---|---|---|---|---|---|---|
| Cy Young | 39 | 287 2/3 | 13 | 21 | 3.19 | 140 |
| Joe Harris | 30 | 235 | 2 | 21 | 3.52 | 99 |
| Bill Dinneen | 28 | 218 2/3 | 8 | 19 | 2.92 | 60 |
| George Winter | 29 | 207 2/3 | 6 | 18 | 4.12 | 72 |
| Jesse Tannehill | 27 | 196 1/3 | 13 | 11 | 3.16 | 82 |
| Frank Oberlin | 4 | 34 | 1 | 3 | 3.18 | 13 |
| Ed Barry | 3 | 21 | 0 | 3 | 6.00 | 10 |
| Rube Kroh | 1 | 9 | 1 | 0 | 0.00 | 5 |

==== Other pitchers ====
Note: G = Games pitched; IP = Innings pitched; W = Wins; L = Losses; ERA = Earned run average; SO = Strikeouts

| Player | G | IP | W | L | ERA | SO |
|---|---|---|---|---|---|---|
| Ralph Glaze | 19 | 123 | 4 | 6 | 3.59 | 56 |
| Len Swormstedt | 3 | 21 | 1 | 1 | 1.29 | 6 |
| Norwood Gibson | 5 | 18 2/3 | 0 | 2 | 5.30 | 3 |

==== Relief pitchers ====
Note: G = Games pitched; W = Wins; L = Losses; SV = Saves; ERA = Earned run average; SO = Strikeouts

| Player | G | W | L | SV | ERA | SO |
|---|---|---|---|---|---|---|
| Ed Hughes | 2 | 0 | 0 | 0 | 5.40 | 3 |
