= Chick Stahl =

American baseball player (1873–1907)

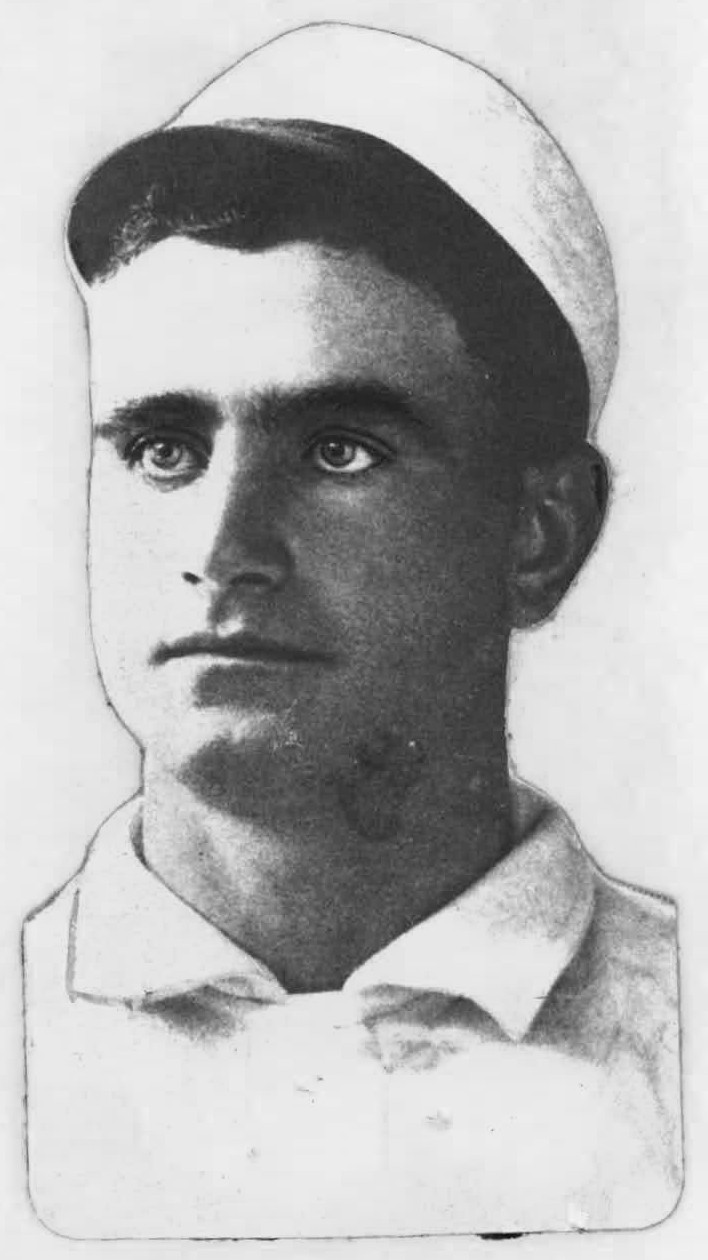
- Outfielder
- Born: January 10, 1873; Avilla, Indiana, U.S.
- Died: March 28, 1907 (aged 34); West Baden, Indiana, U.S.
- Batted: Left Threw: Left

MLB debut
- April 19, 1897, for the Boston Beaneaters

Last MLB appearance
- October 6, 1906, for the Boston Americans

MLB statistics
- Batting average: .305
- Home runs: 36
- Runs batted in: 622
- Stats at Baseball Reference

Teams
- As player: Boston Beaneaters (1897–1900); Boston Americans (1901–1906); As manager: Boston Americans (1906)

Career highlights and awards
- World Series champion (1903)

Charles Sylvester "Chick" Stahl (January 10, 1873 – March 28, 1907) was an American outfielder in Major League Baseball who was among the most feared and consistent hitters in his time. Stahl was an active major-league player when he died by suicide during spring training before the 1907 season.

== Career ==
In his rookie 1897 season with the Boston Americans, he batted .354, and over his first sixty-nine games, he averaged over .300. In 1899, he had six hits in a game, and in the 1903 World Series, he hit three triples. By 1904, including his time with the Beaneaters and the Boston Americans, Stahl had been a key part of four pennant winning teams in seven seasons.

In 1906, he was named acting manager of the Americans after his friend Jimmy Collins was suspended and decided to focus on his playing, and also due to the club's ownership opting for a change following a poor season by the club. He was officially named player-manager on December 4, 1906.

In 1,304 games played, Stahl compiled a .305 batting average (1546–5069) with 858 runs scored, 219 doubles, 118 triples, 36 home runs, 622 RBI, 189 stolen bases, 470 walks, an on-base percentage of .369 and slugging percentage of .416 in 10 major-league seasons. In the 1903 World Series, he hit .303 (10–33), scoring 6 runs and recording 3 RBI, helping the Boston Americans win the first modern World Series.

=== Managerial record ===
Team	Year	Regular season					Postseason			
Team	Year	Games	Won	Lost	Win %	Finish	Won	Lost	Win %	Result
BOA	1906	40	14	26	.350	8th in AL	–	–	–	–
Total		40	14	26	.350		0	0	–	

== Death ==
In March 1907, Stahl died by suicide during spring training in West Baden, Indiana, by drinking four ounces of carbolic acid. The reason for Stahl's suicide has remained a mystery for over a century. He was known as a carefree, fun-loving man and had many love affairs going on throughout the country. He had mentioned suicide days before in Louisville, Kentucky, prompting some teammates to take the carbolic acid from him. His final words to some of teammates were "Boys, I just couldn't help it. It drove me to it." What "it" exactly was remains a mystery. A 1908 newspaper article claims that he was despondent because he had been tasked with discharging his friend Collins from the team.

Cy Young reluctantly took over as manager to start the 1907 season, but he was replaced six games into the season. Collins was traded to Philadelphia in June 1907. Stahl's widow mysteriously died a year and a half later. Just prior to her death, Julia Stahl was seen walking in a poor area of Boston while lavishly dressed. However, no bystanders seem to have seen the events of the last moments of her life.

Chick Stahl was not related to Jake Stahl, despite contemporary baseball sources listing them as brothers.

Stahl was mentioned along with teammates Bill Dinneen and Cy Young in the revival of the song "Tessie" (2004) by Dropkick Murphys.

== See also ==
- List of baseball players who died during their careers
- List of Major League Baseball career stolen bases leaders
- List of Major League Baseball career triples leaders
- List of Major League Baseball annual triples leaders
- List of Major League Baseball player-managers
- List of Major League Baseball single-game hits leaders
