= Bob Peterson (baseball) =

American baseball player (1884-1962)

- Catcher
- Born: June 16, 1884; Philadelphia, Pennsylvania, U.S.
- Died: November 27, 1962 (aged 78); Evesham Township, New Jersey, U.S.
- Batted: Right Threw: Right

MLB debut
- April 18, 1906, for the Boston Americans

Last MLB appearance
- October 5, 1907, for the Boston Americans

MLB statistics
- Batting average: .191
- Hits: 1
- Runs batted in: 9
- Stats at Baseball Reference

Teams
- Boston Americans (1906–1907)

Robert Andrew Peterson (June 16, 1884 – November 27, 1962) was an American utility player in Major League Baseball, playing mainly as a catcher for the Boston Americans from 1906 through 1907. Listed at 6 ft 1 in (1.85 m), 160lb., Peterson batted and threw right-handed.

== Formative years ==
Peterson was born in Philadelphia, Pennsylvania on June 16, 1884.

== Career ==
In a two-season career, Peterson was a .191 hitter (25-for-131) with two home runs and nine RBI in 43 games, including 11 runs, one double, one triple, and one stolen base. He made 40 appearances as a catcher (34), second baseman (3), first baseman (2) and left fielder (1).

== Death ==
Peterson died in Evesham Township, New Jersey on November 27, 1962 (aged 78).

== See also ==
- 1906 Boston Americans season
- 1907 Boston Americans season
