= Mike Cunningham (baseball) =

American baseball player (1882-1969)

- Pitcher
- Born: June 14, 1882; Lancaster, South Carolina, U.S.
- Died: December 10, 1969 (aged 87); Lancaster, South Carolina, U.S.
- Batted: Right Threw: Right

MLB debut
- August 31, 1906, for the Philadelphia Athletics

Last MLB appearance
- September 21, 1906, for the Philadelphia Athletics

MLB statistics
- Win–loss record: 1–0
- Earned run average: 3.21
- Strikeouts: 15
- Stats at Baseball Reference

Teams
- Philadelphia Athletics (1906)

Mody Cunningham (June 14, 1882 – December 10, 1969) was an American Major League Baseball pitcher. He played for the Philadelphia Athletics during the 1906 season. He attended the University of South Carolina.
