= Simon Nicholls =

American baseball player (1882–1911)

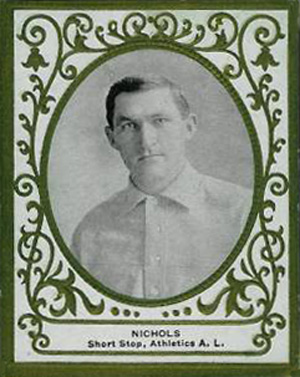
- Shortstop
- Born: July 18, 1882; Germantown, Maryland, U.S.
- Died: March 12, 1911 (aged 28); Baltimore, Maryland, U.S.
- Batted: Left Threw: Right

MLB debut
- September 18, 1903, for the Detroit Tigers

Last MLB appearance
- April 25, 1910, for the Cleveland Naps

MLB statistics
- Batting average: .251
- Home runs: 4
- Runs batted in: 58
- Stats at Baseball Reference

Teams
- Detroit Tigers (1903); Philadelphia Athletics (1906–1909); Cleveland Naps (1910)

Simon Burdette Nicholls (July 18, 1882 – March 12, 1911) was an American professional baseball shortstop. He played in Major League Baseball (MLB) for the Detroit Tigers, Philadelphia Athletics, and Cleveland Naps. A native of Boyds, Maryland, he attended the Maryland Agricultural College. He was signed as an emergency replacement by the Tigers during a road trip to Washington in 1903 and played both games of a doubleheader for the Tigers. He was a member of the Philadelphia Athletics from 1906 to 1909, and was the team's primary shortstop in 1907 and 1908. He appeared for the Cleveland Naps in only three games at the beginning of the 1910 season. He spent most of that season with the minor-league Baltimore Orioles and was named the team's captain. He died of complications from typhoid fever in Baltimore before the beginning of the 1911 season.

In 312 games over six seasons, Nicholls posted a .251 batting average (284-for-1133) with 144 runs, 4 home runs, 58 RBI, 27 stolen bases and 65 bases on balls. He finished his career with an overall .918 fielding percentage.

Recorded the 1st hit and 1st run scored in the history of Shibe Park in 1909

== Personal life ==
Simon Burdette Nicholls was born on July 18, 1882, in Germantown, Maryland, the older of two sons born to George (1848–1919) and Courtney (Burdette) (1846–1887) Nicholls. He had one younger brother, Roger Darby Nicholls (1885–1966), a native of Gaithersburg, Maryland. His father raised Simon and Roger on the family farm after Courtney died when Simon was five and Roger was two.
