= Harry Hardy (baseball) =

American baseball player (1875-1943)

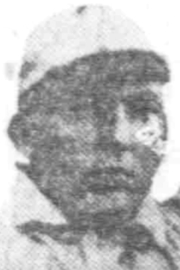
- Pitcher
- Born: November 5, 1875; Steubenville, Ohio, U.S.
- Died: September 4, 1943 (aged 67); Steubenville, Ohio, U.S.
- Batted: Left Threw: Left

MLB debut
- September 26, 1905, for the Washington Senators

Last MLB appearance
- September 26, 1906, for the Washington Senators

MLB statistics
- Win–loss record: 1–4
- Earned run average: 5.11
- Strikeouts: 14
- Stats at Baseball Reference

Teams
- Washington Senators (1905–1906)

Harry Hardy (November 5, 1875 – September 4, 1943) was an American professional baseball player who played pitcher in the Major Leagues from 1905 to 1906. He played for the Washington Senators.

Harry Hardy, son of English-born Robert Hardy and Mary Jane Price, was born in 1875.

Harry Hardy and Pearl Colton were married in 1897 in Steubenville, Ohio. Harry was 21, Pearl was 19 years old.

Harry was 67 when he died of sudden heart attach in Steubenville, Ohio, on 4 September 1943.
