= Jake Stahl =

American baseball player and manager (1879–1922)

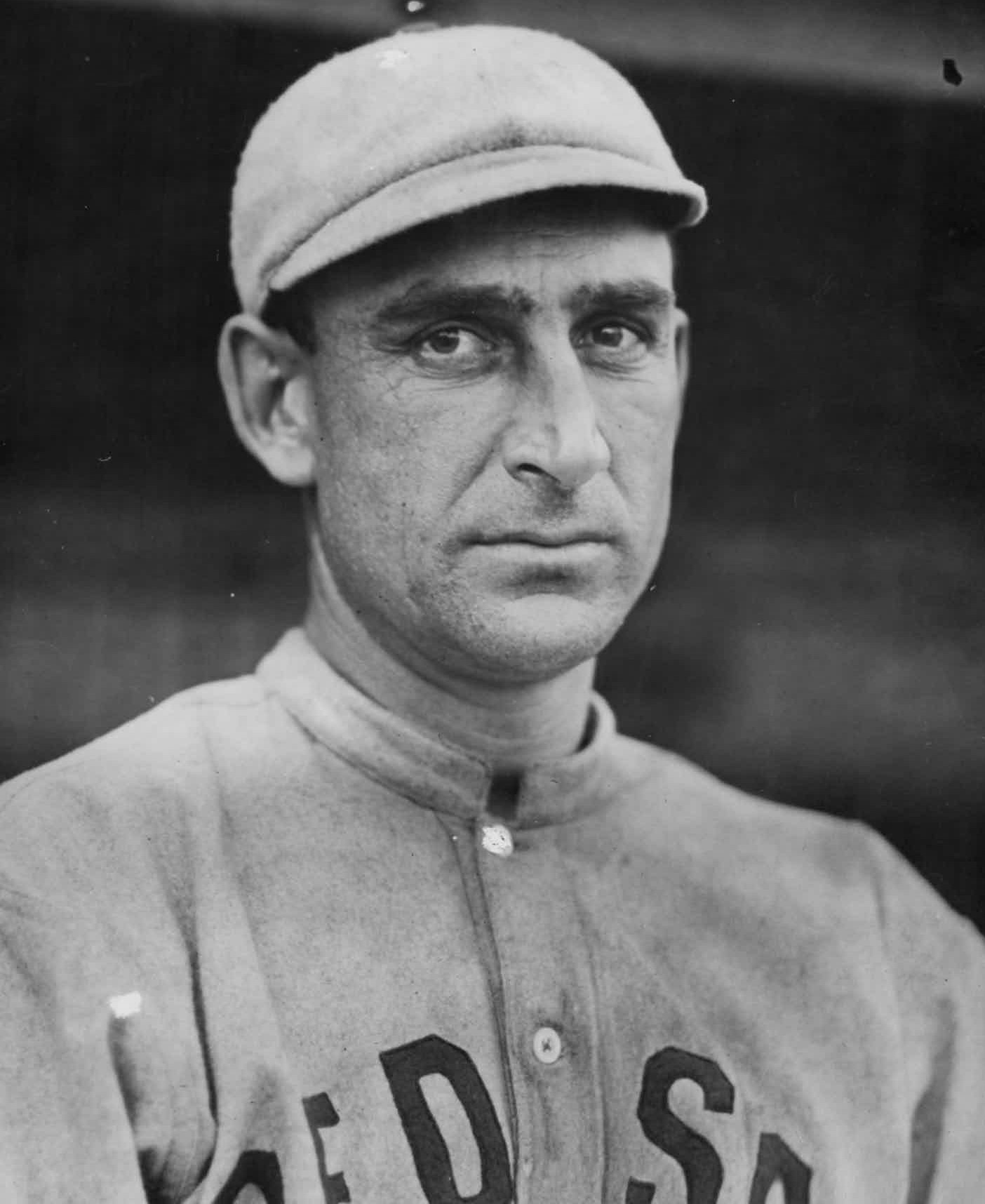
- Stahl with the Boston Red Sox in 1913
- First baseman / Manager
- Born: April 13, 1879; Elkhart, Illinois, U.S.
- Died: September 18, 1922 (aged 43); Monrovia, California, U.S.
- Batted: Right Threw: Right

MLB debut
- June 6, 1903, for the Boston Americans

Last MLB appearance
- June 13, 1913, for the Boston Red Sox

MLB statistics
- Batting average: .261
- Home runs: 31
- Runs batted in: 437
- Stolen bases: 178
- Managerial record: 263–270
- Winning %: .493
- Stats at Baseball Reference

Teams
- As player: Boston Americans (1903); Washington Senators (1904–1906); New York Highlanders (1908); Boston Red Sox (1908–1910, 1912–1913); As manager: Washington Senators (1905–1906); Boston Red Sox (1912–1913)

Career highlights and awards
- World Series champion (1912); AL home run leader (1910)

Garland "Jake" Stahl (April 13, 1879 – September 18, 1922) was an American first baseman and manager in Major League Baseball with the Boston Red Sox, Washington Senators, and New York Highlanders.

== Biography ==
A graduate of the University of Illinois, he was a member of the Kappa Kappa chapter of Sigma Chi.

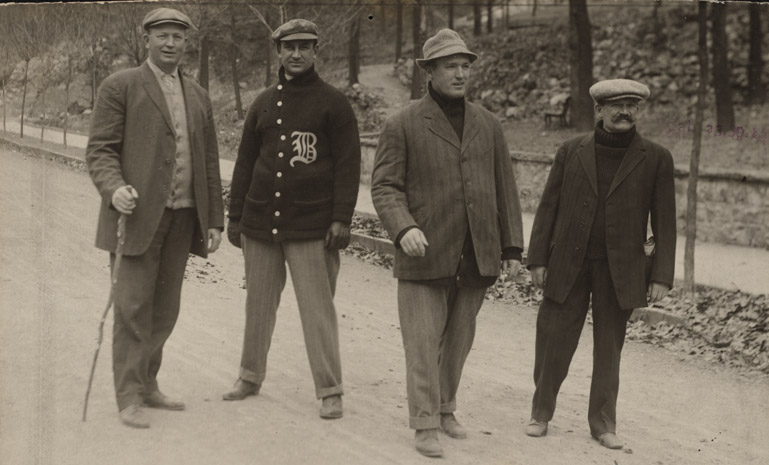
L to R: Cy Young, Stahl, Bill Carrigan and Michael T. McGreevy during spring training in 1912.

Stahl began his baseball career as a catcher with the Boston Americans in 1903, before being purchased by the Washington Senators, where he moved to first base full-time, with occasional stints in the outfield. He was purchased from the Senators by the Chicago White Sox in May 1907, although he did not play that year. In October, the White Sox traded him to the New York Highlanders in a three-team trade, with Frank LaPorte going from the Highlanders to the Americans and Freddy Parent going from the Americans to the White Sox. In July 1908, he was purchased from the Highlanders by the Boston Red Sox.

He was regarded as a good fielder and an average hitter, although he did lead all hitters in the American League in home runs with 10 in 1910. He also struck out 128 times for the year, a record that would stand until 1938. As a player-manager, he led the Senators to two seventh-place finishes in 1905 and 1906.

Stahl sat out the 1911 season, instead opting to return to his native Illinois, where he took a position as a bank manager for a firm on the South side of Chicago.

Stahl was offered a position as player-manager of the Boston Red Sox for 1912 — a position which required the team and Stahl to obtain formal reinstatement by baseball's National Commission since Stahl had been previously deemed to be in violation of "rule 33" when he failed to report in 1911. This dispensation was given in January 1912, freeing Stahl to assume his place as player-manager of the Red Sox. The team did not elect to fine him for his absence in 1911., and in his second managerial stint led the Red Sox to the 1912 World Series title. His success was short-lived, as he had a falling-out with his teammates and resigned midway through the 1913 season. His successor, Bill Carrigan, would win two more World Series titles for the Sox.

After baseball, he became a banker, working with his father-in-law bank president. He soon became a vice president and board member at Washington Park National Bank. He became president in 1919, but he suffered a nervous breakdown the following year. He spent two years in a sanitarium in Monrovia, California but contracted tuberculosis. He died of the disease on September 18, 1922, at age 43.

Stahl has a measure of immortality as the acknowledged eponym of the term "jaking it", a baseball phrase for faking an injury to stay out of the lineup, or otherwise loafing.

Stahl was not related to Red Sox teammate Chick Stahl, despite contemporary accounts erroneously listing them as brothers.

== Managerial record ==
| Team | Year | Regular season | | | | | Postseason | | | |
| Team | Year | Games | Won | Lost | Win % | Finish | Won | Lost | Win % | Result |
|---|---|---|---|---|---|---|---|---|---|---|
| WAS | 1905 | 151 | 64 | 87 | .424 | 7th in AL | – | – | – | – |
| WAS | 1906 | 150 | 55 | 95 | .367 | 7th in AL | – | – | – | – |
| WAS total | | 301 | 119 | 182 | .395 | | 0 | 0 | – | |
| BOS | 1912 | 152 | 105 | 47 | .691 | 1st in AL | 4 | 3 | .571 | Won World Series (NYG) |
| BOS | 1913 | 80 | 39 | 41 | .488 | resigned | – | – | – | – |
| BOS total | | 232 | 144 | 88 | .621 | | 4 | 3 | .571 | |
| Total | | 533 | 263 | 270 | .493 | | 4 | 3 | .571 | |

== See also ==
- List of Major League Baseball annual home run leaders
- List of Major League Baseball career stolen bases leaders
- List of Major League Baseball player-managers
