= Jim Holmes (baseball) =

American baseball player (1882–1960)

- Pitcher
- Born: August 2, 1882; Lawrenceburg, Kentucky, U.S.
- Died: March 10, 1960 (aged 77); Jacksonville, Florida, U.S.
- Batted: Unknown Threw: Unknown

MLB debut
- September 8, 1906, for the Philadelphia Athletics

Last MLB appearance
- October 7, 1908, for the Brooklyn Superbas

MLB statistics
- Win–loss record: 1–5
- Earned run average: 3.49
- Strikeouts: 11
- Stats at Baseball Reference

Teams
- Philadelphia Athletics (1906); Brooklyn Superbas (1908)

James Scott Holmes (August 2, 1882 in Lawrenceburg, Kentucky – March 10, 1960 in Jacksonville, Florida) was an American pitcher in Major League Baseball. He pitched in 3 games for the Philadelphia Athletics during the 1906 season and in 13 games for the Brooklyn Superbas in 1908.
