= Louis Leroy (baseball) =

American baseball player (1879–1944)

- Pitcher
- Born: February 18, 1879; Omro, Wisconsin, U.S.
- Died: October 10, 1944 (aged 65); Shawano, Wisconsin, U.S.
- Batted: Right Threw: Right

MLB debut
- September 22, 1905, for the New York Highlanders

Last MLB appearance
- April 20, 1910, for the Boston Red Sox

MLB statistics
- Win–loss record: 3–1
- Strikeouts: 39
- Earned run average: 3.22
- Stats at Baseball Reference

Teams
- New York Highlanders (1905–1906); Boston Red Sox (1910)

Louis Paul Leroy (February 18, 1879 – October 10, 1944) was an American pitcher in Major League Baseball who played from 1905 through 1910 for the New York Highlanders (1905–1906) and Boston Red Sox (1910). Listed at 5 ft 10 in (1.78 m), 180 pounds (82 kg), Leroy batted and threw right-handed.

He was born in Omro, Wisconsin and was a member of the Stockbridge–Munsee Community.

In a three-season career, Leroy posted a 3–1 record with 39 strikeouts and a 3.22 ERA in 15 appearances, including five starts, three complete games, one save, and 72 2/3 innings of work.

Prior to his baseball career Leroy was a running back at Carlisle Indian School.

Leroy died in Shawano, Wisconsin at age 65.
