= Ed Smith (1900s pitcher) =

American baseball player (1879–1956)

- Pitcher
- Born: February 21, 1879; Mentone, Indiana, U.S.
- Died: March 20, 1956 (aged 77); Tarpon Springs, Florida, U.S.
- Batted: Right Threw: Right

MLB debut
- April 27, 1906, for the St. Louis Browns

Last MLB appearance
- October 7, 1906, for the St. Louis Browns

MLB statistics
- Win–loss record: 8–11
- Earned run average: 3.72
- Strikeouts: 45
- Stats at Baseball Reference

Teams
- St. Louis Browns (1906)

Rhesa Edward Smith (February 21, 1879 – March 20, 1956) was an American pitcher in Major League Baseball who played for the St. Louis Browns in 1906.
