= Chris Lindsay =

American baseball player (1878–1941)

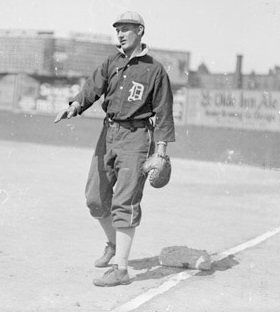
- First baseman
- Born: July 24, 1878; Moon Township, Pennsylvania, U.S.
- Died: January 25, 1941 (aged 62); Cleveland, Ohio, U.S.
- Batted: Right Threw: Right

MLB debut
- July 5, 1905, for the Detroit Tigers

Last MLB appearance
- October 7, 1906, for the Detroit Tigers

MLB statistics
- Batting average: .242
- Home runs: 0
- Runs batted in: 64
- Stats at Baseball Reference

Teams
- Detroit Tigers (1905–06)

Christian Haller Lindsay (July 24, 1878 – January 25, 1941), nicknamed "Pinky" and "the Crab", was an American first baseman in Major League Baseball who played in 1905 and 1906 for the Detroit Tigers. Listed at 6 ft 0 in (1.83 m), 190 lb., Lindsay batted and threw right-handed. He was born in Moon Township, Pennsylvania.

In two-season career, Lindsay was a .242 hitter (200-for-828) with 97 runs and 64 RBI in 229 games, including 30 doubles, three triples, and 28 stolen bases without home runs.

Lindsay died at the age of 62 in Cleveland, Ohio.
