= Hack Schumann =

American baseball player (1884-1946)

- Pitcher
- Born: August 13, 1884; Buffalo, New York, U.S.
- Died: March 25, 1946 (aged 61); Millgrove, New York, U.S.
- Batted: Unknown Threw: Right

MLB debut
- September 18, 1906, for the Philadelphia Athletics

Last MLB appearance
- October 3, 1906, for the Philadelphia Athletics

MLB statistics
- Win–loss record: 0–2
- Earned run average: 4.00
- Strikeouts: 9
- Stats at Baseball Reference

Teams
- Philadelphia Athletics (1906)

Charles J. "Hack" Schumann (August 13, 1884 – March 25, 1946) was an American Major League Baseball pitcher. He played for the Philadelphia Athletics during the 1906 season.
