= 1906 Detroit Tigers season =

Major League Baseball season

1906 Detroit Tigers
- League: American League
- Ballpark: Bennett Park
- City: Detroit, Michigan
- Record: 71–78 (.477)
- League place: 6th
- Owners: William H. Yawkey
- Managers: Bill Armour

1906 was the sixth year for the Detroit Tigers in the American League. The team finished in sixth place with a record of 71–78 (.477), 21 games behind the Chicago White Sox.

== Regular season ==
The 1906 Tigers were outscored by their opponents 599 to 518. The team's attendance at Bennett Park was 174,043, seventh out of the eight teams in the AL.

=== Season standings ===
American League
Team	W	L	Pct.	GB	Home	Road
Chicago White Sox	93	58	.616	—	54‍–‍23	39‍–‍35
New York Highlanders	90	61	.596	3	53‍–‍23	37‍–‍38
Cleveland Naps	89	64	.582	5	47‍–‍30	42‍–‍34
Philadelphia Athletics	78	67	.538	12	48‍–‍23	30‍–‍44
St. Louis Browns	76	73	.510	16	40‍–‍34	36‍–‍39
Detroit Tigers	71	78	.477	21	42‍–‍34	29‍–‍44
Washington Senators	55	95	.367	37½	33‍–‍41	22‍–‍54
Boston Americans	49	105	.318	45½	22‍–‍54	27‍–‍51

=== Record vs. opponents ===
1906 American League record Sources:
Team	BOS	CWS	CLE	DET	NYH	PHA	SLB	WSH
Boston	—	4–18	8–14	10–12	5–17–1	8–14	5–17	9–13
Chicago	18–4	—	12–10–1	11–11	12–10–1	12–9	13–7–1	15–7
Cleveland	8–14	10–12–1	—	14–8–1	10–11–1	12–10–1	14–8	15–7
Detroit	12–10	11–11	8–14–1	—	11–11	6–13	9–13–1	14–6
New York	17–5–1	10–12–1	11–10–1	11–11	—	13–8	13–8–1	15–7
Philadelphia	14–8	9–12	10–12–1	13–6	8–13	—	9–11–2	15–5–1
St. Louis	17–5	7–13–1	8–14	13–9–1	8–13–1	11–9–2	—	12–10
Washington	13–9	7–15	7–15	6–14	7–15	5–15–1	10–12	—

=== Notable transactions ===
- August 1906: Jack Rowan was acquired by the Tigers from the Leavenworth Old Soldiers.

=== Roster ===
1906 Detroit Tigers
Roster
Pitchers: Red Donahue; Bill Donovan; John Eubank; Ed Killian; George Mullin; Jack Rowan; Ed Siever; Jimmy Wiggs; Ed Willett	Catchers: Fred Payne; Boss Schmidt; Jack Warner; Infielders: Bill Coughlin; Gus Hetling; Chris Lindsay; Bobby Lowe; Charley O'Leary; Germany Schaefer; Frank Scheibeck	Outfielders: Ty Cobb; Sam Crawford; Davy Jones; Matty McIntyre; Sam Thompson	Manager: Bill Armour

== Player stats ==
=== Batting ===
==== Starters by position ====
Note: Pos = Position; G = Games played; AB = At bats; H = Hits; Avg. = Batting average; HR = Home runs; RBI = Runs batted in

Pos	Player	G	AB	H	Avg.	HR	RBI
C	Boss Schmidt	68	216	47	.218	0	10
1B	Chris Lindsay	141	499	112	.224	0	33
2B	Germany Schaefer	124	446	106	.238	2	42
3B	Bill Coughlin	147	498	117	.235	2	60
SS	Charley O'Leary	128	443	97	.219	2	34
OF	Matty McIntyre	133	493	128	.260	0	39
OF	Sam Crawford	145	563	166	.295	2	72
OF	Ty Cobb	98	358	113	.316	1	34

==== Other batters ====
Note: G = Games played; AB = At bats; H = Hits; Avg. = Batting average; HR = Home runs; RBI = Runs batted in

Player	G	AB	H	Avg.	HR	RBI
Davy Jones	84	323	84	.260	0	24
Fred Payne	72	222	60	.270	0	20
Jack Warner	50	153	37	.242	0	10
Bobby Lowe	41	145	30	.207	1	12
Sam Thompson	8	31	7	.226	0	3
Frank Scheibeck	3	10	1	.100	0	0
Gus Hetling	2	7	1	.143	0	0

Note: pitchers' batting statistics not included

=== Pitching ===
==== Starting pitchers ====
Note: G = Games pitched; IP = Innings pitched; W = Wins; L = Losses; ERA = Earned run average; SO = Strikeouts

Player	G	IP	W	L	ERA	SO
George Mullin	40	330.0	21	18	2.78	123
Red Donahue	28	241.0	13	14	2.73	82
Ed Siever	30	222.2	14	11	2.71	71
Bill Donovan	25	211.2	9	15	3.15	85
Ed Killian	21	149.2	10	6	3.43	47
Ed Willett	3	25.0	0	3	3.96	16
Jack Rowan	1	9.0	0	1	11.00	0

==== Other pitchers ====
Note: G = Games pitched; IP = Innings pitched; W = Wins; L = Losses; ERA = Earned run average; SO = Strikeouts

Player	G	IP	W	L	ERA	SO
John Eubank	24	135.0	4	10	3.53	38
Jimmy Wiggs	4	10.1	0	0	5.23	7
