= Otto Williams =

American baseball player (1877–1937)

- Shortstop / Infielder
- Born: November 2, 1877; Newark, New Jersey, U.S.
- Died: March 19, 1937 (aged 59); Omaha, Nebraska, U.S.
- Batted: Right Threw: Right

MLB debut
- October 5, 1902, for the St. Louis Cardinals

Last MLB appearance
- June 9, 1906, for the Washington Senators

MLB statistics
- Batting average: .203
- Stolen bases: 24
- Runs: 48
- Stats at Baseball Reference

Teams
- St. Louis Cardinals (1902–1903); Chicago Cubs (1903–1904); Washington Senators 1906

Otto George Williams (November 2, 1877 – March 19, 1937) was an American Major League Baseball player and coach.

== Career ==
Williams played for the St. Louis Cardinals in 1902 and 1903, the Chicago Cubs in 1903 and 1904, and Washington Senators in 1906. He played all infield positions, primarily shortstop, and also played 21 games in the outfield. In his career, he played 170 games in the Major Leagues, with 113 hits and no home runs in 558 at bats for a batting average of .203. He scored 48 runs and had 34 runs batted in, along with an on-base percentage of .244 and a slugging percentage of .237. As a fielder, he made 66 errors in 848 fielding chances for a fielding percentage of .922, with 31 double plays. In 98 games as a shortstop, he made 52 errors in 548 chances, for a fielding percentage of .905. He received the most playing time in his Major League career in 1903, which he split between the Cardinals and the Cubs after being sold to the Cubs in July. That season he played 91 games, including 78 at shortstop, and had 317 at bats with 67 hits, for a batting average of .211 with 14 stolen bases. He served as a coach for the Detroit Tigers in 1925, the Cardinals in 1926, the St. Louis Browns in 1929 and the Cincinnati Reds in 1930.

Williams also had an extensive minor league career. He played for the St. Paul Saints in 1901, and played in 101 games for the Memphis Frankfurters in 1902 before being called up to the Cardinals. After spending the remainder of 1902, 1903 and 1904 in the Major Leagues, Williams was back in the minors in 1905, playing for the New Orleans Pelicans of the Southern Association. He played 126 games for the Pelicans in 1905, with 130 hits in 467 at bats for a batting average of .278 and helped the Pelicans win the Southern Association title, despite the fact that, as the result of a yellow fever epidemic in New Orleans, the team had to play the final month on the road. After spending time with the Major League Senators in 1906, Williams played for the Indianapolis Indians of the American Association from the end of the 1906 season through 1912. He then played for five different minor league teams from 1913 through 1917. Overall, he played at least 1730 games in the minor leagues, with at least 6282 at bats and a batting average of .243.

Williams died of pneumonia on March 19, 1937, in Omaha, Nebraska.

== See also ==
- List of St. Louis Cardinals coaches
