= Jim Byrnes (baseball) =

American baseball player (1880–1941)

- Catcher
- Born: January 5, 1880; San Francisco, California, U.S.
- Died: July 31, 1941 (aged 61); San Francisco, California, U.S.
- Batted: Right Threw: Right

MLB debut
- April 19, 1906, for the Philadelphia Athletics

Last MLB appearance
- October 3, 1906, for the Philadelphia Athletics

MLB statistics
- At bats: 23
- RBI: 0
- Home runs: 0
- Batting average: .174
- Stats at Baseball Reference

Teams
- Philadelphia Athletics (1906)

James Joseph Byrnes (January 5, 1880 – July 31, 1941) was an American Major League Baseball catcher. He played for the Philadelphia Athletics during the 1906 season.
