= Jack Hannifin =

American baseball player (1883-1945)

- Infielder
- Born: February 25, 1883; Holyoke, Massachusetts, U.S.
- Died: October 27, 1945 (aged 62); Northampton, Massachusetts, U.S.
- Batted: Right Threw: Right

MLB debut
- April 19, 1906, for the Philadelphia Athletics

Last MLB appearance
- October 7, 1908, for the Boston Doves

MLB statistics
- Batting average: .214
- Hits: 94
- Runs batted in: 40
- Stolen bases: 14
- Stats at Baseball Reference

Teams
- Philadelphia Athletics (1906); New York Giants (1906–1908); Boston Doves (1908)

John Joseph Hannifin (February 25, 1883 – October 27, 1945) was an American Major League Baseball infielder. He played for the Philadelphia Athletics during the 1906 season, the New York Giants from 1906 to 1908, and the Boston Doves during the 1908 season.
