= Frank Hemphill =

American baseball player (1878–1950)

- Left fielder
- Born: May 13, 1878; Greenville, Michigan, U.S.
- Died: November 16, 1950 (aged 72); Chicago, Illinois, U.S.
- Batted: Right Threw: Right

MLB debut
- April 17, 1906, for the Chicago White Sox

Last MLB appearance
- June 23, 1909, for the Washington Senators

MLB statistics
- Batting average: .070
- Home runs: 0
- Runs batted in: 2
- Stats at Baseball Reference

Teams
- Chicago White Sox (1906); Washington Senators (1909)

Frank Vernon Hemphill (May 13, 1878 – November 16, 1950) was an American left fielder in Major League Baseball who played for the Chicago White Sox (1906) and Washington Senators (1909). Listed at 5 ft 11 in (1.80 m), 165 lb, Hemphill batted and threw right-handed. He was born in Greenville, Michigan. His older brother, Charlie Hemphill, also was a major league player.

In a two-season career, Hemphill was a .070 hitter (3-for-40) with two RBI, nine bases on balls, and one stolen base.

In 14 appearances at left field, he collected 33 outs and one assist while committing an error for a .971 fielding percentage.

Hemphill died in Chicago, Illinois at age 72.
