= Warren Shanabrook =

American baseball player

- Third baseman
- Born: November 30, 1880; Massillon, Ohio
- Died: March 10, 1964 (aged 83); North Canton, Ohio
- Batted: Right Threw: Right

MLB debut
- August 13, 1906, for the Washington Senators

Last MLB appearance
- August 14, 1906, for the Washington Senators

MLB statistics
- Games played: 1
- At bats: 2
- Hits: 0
- Stats at Baseball Reference

Teams
- Washington Senators (1906)

Warren Hilton Shanabrook (November 30, 1880 – March 10, 1964) was a Major League Baseball third baseman. Shanabrook played for the Washington Senators in 1906. In one career game, he had no hits in two at-bats. He batted and threw right-handed.

Shanabrook was born in Massillon, Ohio and died in North Canton, Ohio.
