= 1906 St. Louis Browns season =

Major League Baseball season

1906 St. Louis Browns
- League: American League
- Ballpark: Sportsman's Park
- City: St. Louis, Missouri
- Record: 76–73 (.510)
- League place: 5th
- Owners: Robert Hedges
- Managers: Jimmy McAleer

The 1906 St. Louis Browns season was a season in American baseball. It involved the Browns finishing 5th in the American League with a record of 76 wins and 73 losses.

== Offseason ==
- December 1905: Charlie Starr was released by the Browns.

== Regular season ==
=== Season standings ===
American League
Team	W	L	Pct.	GB	Home	Road
Chicago White Sox	93	58	.616	—	54‍–‍23	39‍–‍35
New York Highlanders	90	61	.596	3	53‍–‍23	37‍–‍38
Cleveland Naps	89	64	.582	5	47‍–‍30	42‍–‍34
Philadelphia Athletics	78	67	.538	12	48‍–‍23	30‍–‍44
St. Louis Browns	76	73	.510	16	40‍–‍34	36‍–‍39
Detroit Tigers	71	78	.477	21	42‍–‍34	29‍–‍44
Washington Senators	55	95	.367	37½	33‍–‍41	22‍–‍54
Boston Americans	49	105	.318	45½	22‍–‍54	27‍–‍51

=== Record vs. opponents ===
1906 American League record Sources:
Team	BOS	CWS	CLE	DET	NYH	PHA	SLB	WSH
Boston	—	4–18	8–14	10–12	5–17–1	8–14	5–17	9–13
Chicago	18–4	—	12–10–1	11–11	12–10–1	12–9	13–7–1	15–7
Cleveland	8–14	10–12–1	—	14–8–1	10–11–1	12–10–1	14–8	15–7
Detroit	12–10	11–11	8–14–1	—	11–11	6–13	9–13–1	14–6
New York	17–5–1	10–12–1	11–10–1	11–11	—	13–8	13–8–1	15–7
Philadelphia	14–8	9–12	10–12–1	13–6	8–13	—	9–11–2	15–5–1
St. Louis	17–5	7–13–1	8–14	13–9–1	8–13–1	11–9–2	—	12–10
Washington	13–9	7–15	7–15	6–14	7–15	5–15–1	10–12	—

=== Roster ===
1906 St. Louis Browns
Roster
Pitchers: Fred Glade; Harry Howell; Beany Jacobson; Barney Pelty; Jack Powell; Ed Smith	Catchers: Jack O'Connor; Branch Rickey; Tubby Spencer; Infielders: Roy Hartzell; Tom Jones; Lou Nordyke; Pete O'Brien; Ike Rockenfield; Bobby Wallace	Outfielders: Charlie Hemphill; Ben Koehler; Harry Niles; George Stone	Manager: Jimmy McAleer

== Player stats ==
=== Batting ===
==== Starters by position ====
Note: Pos = Position; G = Games played; AB = At bats; H = Hits; Avg. = Batting average; HR = Home runs; RBI = Runs batted in

Pos	Player	G	AB	H	Avg.	HR	RBI
C	Branch Rickey	65	201	57	.284	3	24
1B	Tom Jones	144	539	136	.252	0	30
2B	Pete O'Brien	151	544	122	.233	2	57
SS	Bobby Wallace	139	476	123	.258	2	67
3B	Roy Hartzell	113	404	86	.213	0	24
OF	Harry Niles	142	541	124	.229	2	31
OF	George Stone	154	581	208	.358	6	71
OF	Charlie Hemphill	154	585	169	.289	4	62

==== Other batters ====
Note: G = Games played; AB = At bats; H = Hits; Avg. = Batting average; HR = Home runs; RBI = Runs batted in

Player	G	AB	H	Avg.	HR	RBI
Tubby Spencer	58	188	33	.176	0	17
Ben Koehler	66	186	41	.220	0	15
Jack O'Connor	55	174	33	.190	0	11
Ike Rockenfield	27	89	21	.236	0	8
Lou Nordyke	25	53	13	.245	0	7

=== Pitching ===
==== Starting pitchers ====
Note: G = Games pitched; IP = Innings pitched; W = Wins; L = Losses; ERA = Earned run average; SO = Strikeouts

Player	G	IP	W	L	ERA	SO
Harry Howell	35	276.2	15	14	2.11	140
Fred Glade	35	266.2	15	14	2.36	96
Barney Pelty	34	260.2	16	11	1.59	92
Jack Powell	28	244.0	13	14	1.77	132
Beany Jacobson	24	155.0	9	9	2.50	53
Ed Smith	19	154.2	8	11	3.72	45
