= Lou Fiene =

American baseball player (1884–1964)

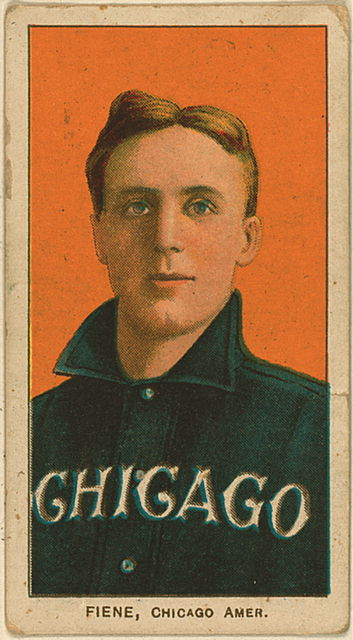
- Pitcher
- Born: December 29, 1884; Fort Dodge, Iowa
- Died: December 22, 1964 (aged 79); Chicago, Illinois
- Batted: Right Threw: Right

MLB debut
- April 21, 1906, for the Chicago White Sox

Last MLB appearance
- August 15, 1909, for the Chicago White Sox

MLB statistics
- Win–loss record: 3–8
- Earned run average: 3.85
- Strikeouts: 54
- Stats at Baseball Reference

Teams
- Chicago White Sox (1906–1909)

Louis Henry Fiene (December 29, 1884 – December 22, 1964) was a pitcher in Major League Baseball. He played for the Chicago White Sox from 1906 to 1909.

== Biography ==
Fiene was born in Fort Dodge, Iowa. Known as "Big Finn," he started his professional baseball career in 1904. That season, he led the Illinois–Indiana–Iowa League in wins (23) and earned run average (2.45). He joined the American Association's Toledo Mud Hens, and in 1905, he went 11–13.

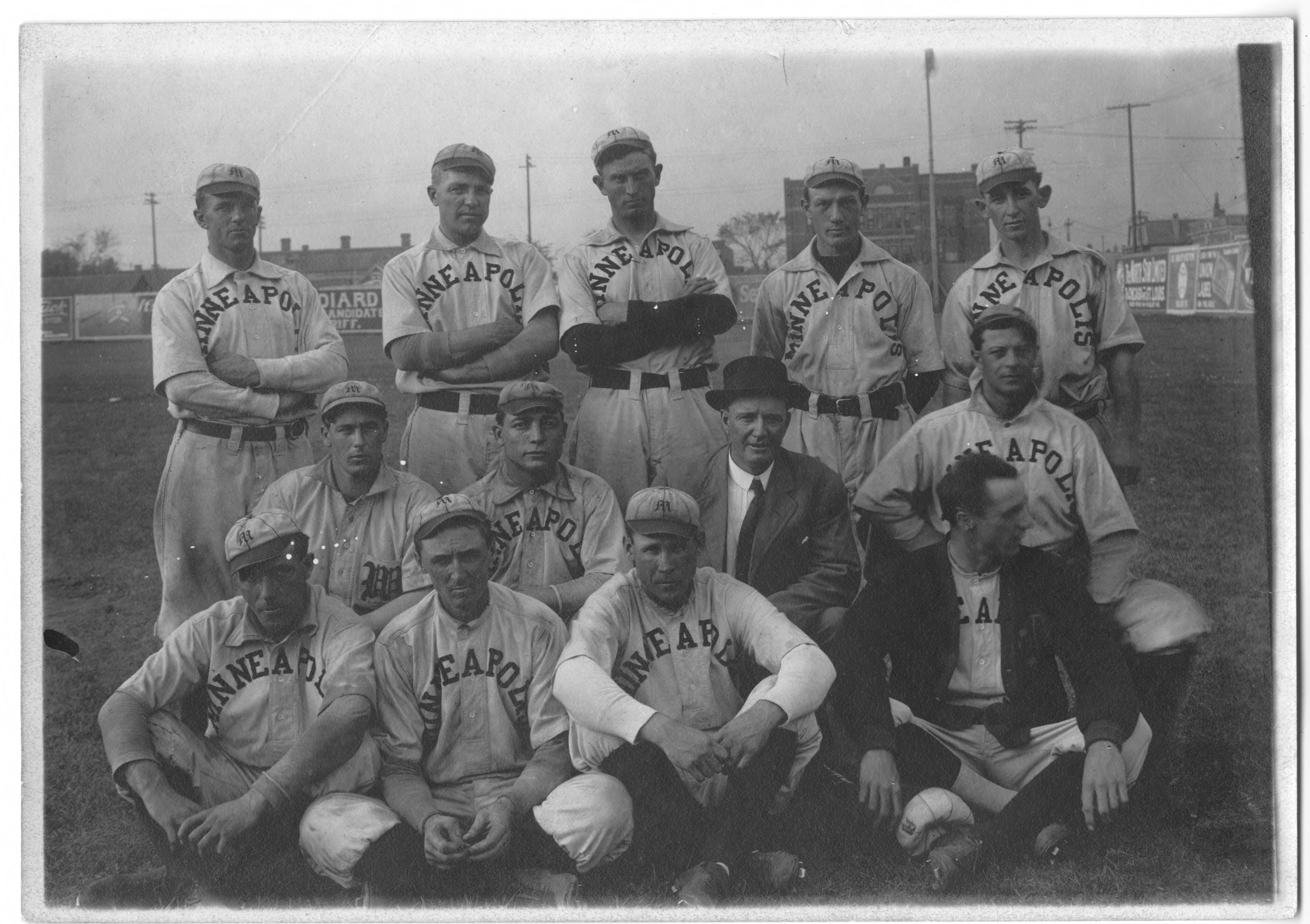
1908 Minneapolis Millers. Fiene is bottom right, in the dark jacket.

Fiene was then purchased by the White Sox. In spring training of 1906, he claimed to have mastered the spitball pitch. He pitched in just six games that season, going 1–1, while Chicago won the World Series. Fiene didn't pitch much in 1907, either. He spent most of 1908 back in the American Association with the Minneapolis Millers, and he won 20 games. That performance earned him a roster spot on the White Sox again. In 1909, he pitched a career-high 72 innings in the major leagues and went 2–5.

In 1910, Fiene went back to Minneapolis and compiled a record of 15–6. He hurt his arm after that and ended up playing at first base and in the outfield for a few years.

Fiene died in Chicago, at the age of 79.
