= Glenn Chapman =

American baseball player (1906–1988)

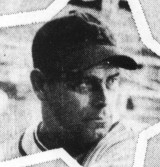
- Chapman, circa 1938
- Outfielder
- Born: January 21, 1906; Cambridge City, Indiana, U.S.
- Died: November 5, 1988 (aged 82); Richmond, Indiana, U.S.
- Batted: Right Threw: Right

MLB debut
- April 18, 1934, for the Brooklyn Dodgers

Last MLB appearance
- September 30, 1934, for the Brooklyn Dodgers

MLB statistics
- Batting average: .280
- Home runs: 1
- Runs scored: 19
- Stats at Baseball Reference

Teams
- Brooklyn Dodgers (1934)

Glenn Justice Chapman (January 21, 1906 – November 5, 1988) was an American Major League Baseball player. Nicknamed "Pete", he played in 67 games for the Brooklyn Dodgers during the 1934 season.
