= St. John Cemetery, Cincinnati =

Roman Catholic cemetery in Hamilton County, Ohio

Coordinates: 39°09′54″N 84°30′16″W

St. John Cemetery, Cincinnati is located at 4423 Vine Street, in St. Bernard, Ohio. This Roman Catholic cemetery was founded in 1849, during a raging cholera epidemic, when many of Cincinnati's other cemeteries were already full of the victims. Many of Cincinnati's oldest German families are buried in this cemetery and the old stones are written in German.

Burials also include 25 Franciscan Friars, who were founding members of the St. John the Baptist Providence. They first came to Cincinnati in July 1844, to serve the evergrowing German population. Some of these young men were as young as 17, 20 and 21, who had left their homelands to the German-speaking Catholics.

Other burials include Clement Barnharm (1857–1935), a Cincinnati sculptor and his parents also John C. Roth a Cincinnati meat packer.

It is managed by the Cincinnati Catholic Cemetery Society.
