= Lee Quillen =

American baseball player (1882–1965)

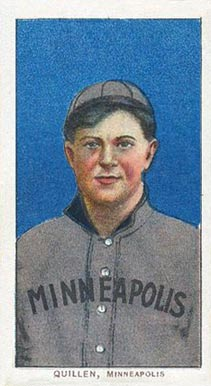
- Third baseman
- Born: May 5, 1882; North Branch, Minnesota, U.S.
- Died: May 14, 1965 (aged 83); Saint Paul, Minnesota, U.S.
- Batted: Right Threw: Right

MLB debut
- September 30, 1906, for the Chicago White Sox

Last MLB appearance
- August 14, 1907, for the Chicago White Sox

MLB statistics
- Batting average: .200
- Home runs: 0
- Runs batted in: 14
- Stats at Baseball Reference

Teams
- Chicago White Sox (1906–07)

Leon Abner Quillen (born Leon Abner Quillin, May 5, 1882 – May 14, 1965) was an American professional baseball third baseman. He played parts of two seasons in Major League Baseball, 1906 and 1907, with the Chicago White Sox.

Quillen started his professional baseball career in 1902 with the minor league Minneapolis Millers of the newly formed American Association. In 1906, he had a breakout year with the Lincoln Ducklings in the Western League, hitting for a .350 average. He was sent to the major league White Sox towards the end of the season and played four games for the eventual World Series champions. The following year, he hit just .192 as Chicago's backup third baseman.

Quillen returned to the Millers in 1908 and 1909. In 1910, he scored 133 runs for the Western League champion Sioux City Packers. After four more years in the minors, Quillen finished his career in 1914 with the Lincoln team, now renamed the Tigers.
