= Bots Nekola =

American baseball player and scout (1906–1987)

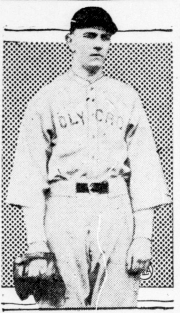
- Pitcher
- Born: December 10, 1906; New York City, U.S.
- Died: March 11, 1987 (aged 80); Rockville Centre, New York, U.S.
- Batted: Left Threw: Left

MLB debut
- July 19, 1929, for the New York Yankees

Last MLB appearance
- April 30, 1933, for the Detroit Tigers

MLB statistics
- Win–loss record: 0–0
- Earned run average: 5.85
- Strikeouts: 2
- Stats at Baseball Reference

Teams
- New York Yankees (1929); Detroit Tigers (1933)

Francis Joseph "Bots" Nekola (December 10, 1906 – March 11, 1987) was an American professional baseball player and scout. The native of New York City was a left-handed pitcher who appeared in 11 games in Major League Baseball for the New York Yankees (1929) and Detroit Tigers (1933). He stood 5 feet 11 inches (1.80 m) tall and weighed 180 pounds (82 kg).

Nekola attended Evander Childs High School and the College of the Holy Cross. He went from the Holy Cross campus to the Majors, appearing with the Yankees in nine games during their 1929 season, all in relief. In his big league debut July 19, he pitched 2 2/3 scoreless, one-hit innings against the Cleveland Indians. Nekola made his first minor league appearance the following season, and his career would continue in the minors through 1938, interrupted only by a two-game trial with the 1933 Tigers.

Over eleven major league games, Nekola had a 0–0 record with a 5.85 earned run average. In 20 total innings pitched, he surrendered 25 hits and 16 bases on balls. He struck out two.

Following his playing career, he was the Boston Red Sox' longtime amateur scout in the New York and New Jersey regions. In that capacity, in 1959, Nekola scouted and signed future Baseball Hall of Fame outfielder Carl Yastrzemski. He also would sign future All-Star shortstop Rico Petrocelli as well as Chuck Schilling, a promising second baseman whose career was derailed by injury. Nekola retired as a scout in 1977, continuing on as a consultant for the team until his death.

Nekola, a resident of New Hyde Park, New York, died on March 11, 1987 at Mercy Hospital in Rockville Centre after a long illness. A funeral mass was held on March 14 at Notre Dame Church in New Hyde Park and he would be buried at Gate of Heaven Cemetery in Hawthorne, New York.
