= Myron Grimshaw =

American baseball player (1875-1936)

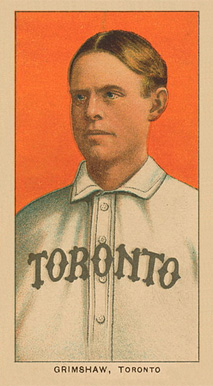
- First baseman
- Born: November 30, 1875; St. Johnsville, New York, U.S.
- Died: December 11, 1936 (aged 61); Canajoharie, New York, U.S.
- Batted: Both Threw: Right

MLB debut
- April 25, 1905, for the Boston Americans

Last MLB appearance
- October 5, 1907, for the Boston Americans

MLB statistics
- Batting average: .256
- Home runs: 4
- Runs batted in: 116
- Stats at Baseball Reference

Teams
- Boston Americans (1905–1907)

Myron Frederick "Moose" Grimshaw (November 30, 1875 – December 11, 1936) was an American right fielder in Major League Baseball who played from 1905 through 1907 for the Boston Americans. Listed at 6 ft 1 in (1.85 m), 173 lb., Grimshaw was a switch-hitter and threw right-handed. He was born in St. Johnsville, New York, but was raised in Canajoharie, New York.

In a three-season career, Grimshaw was a .256 hitter (229-for-894) with four home runs and 116 RBI in 259 games, including 104 runs, 31 doubles, 16 triples, and 15 stolen bases.

Grimshaw died on December 11, 1936 at the age of 61; he suffered a heart attack at the Beech Nut Packing Company plant where he worked in Canajoharie, New York.

== Sources ==
- Career statistics from Baseball Reference · Baseball Reference (Minors) · Retrosheet · Baseball Almanac
