= Willy Wilson (baseball) =

American baseball player (1884–1925)

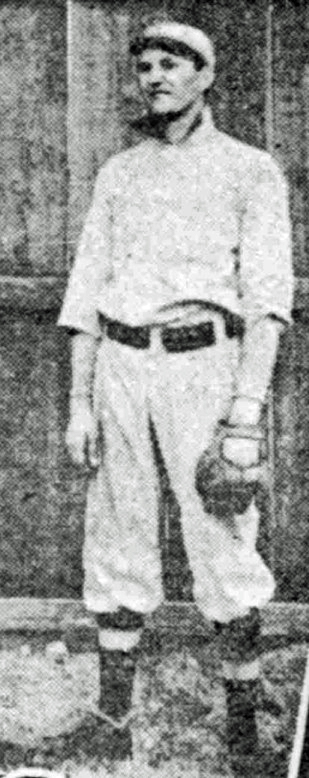
- Pitcher
- Born: January 7, 1884; Columbus, Ohio
- Died: October 28, 1925 (aged 41); Seattle, Washington
- Batted: Right Threw: Right

MLB debut
- October 3, 1906, for the Washington Senators

Last MLB appearance
- October 3, 1906, for the Washington Senators

MLB statistics
- Win–loss record: 0-1
- Earned run average: 2.57
- Strikeouts: 1
- Stats at Baseball Reference

Teams
- Washington Senators (1906)

William Wilson (January 7, 1884 – October 28, 1925) was a professional baseball pitcher. He appeared in one game in Major League Baseball in 1906 for the Washington Senators. He made his lone appearance on the last day of the season, October 3, pitching a seven-inning complete game against the Boston Americans and losing, 2-1.
