= Bob Edmondson (baseball) =

American baseball player (1879–1931)

- Outfielder
- Born: April 30, 1879; Paris, Kentucky, U.S.
- Died: August 14, 1931 (aged 52); Lawrence, Kansas, U.S.
- Batted: Right Threw: Right

MLB debut
- September 15, 1906, for the Washington Senators

Last MLB appearance
- October 8, 1908, for the Washington Senators

MLB statistics
- Batting average: .193
- Home runs: 0
- RBI: 2
- Stats at Baseball Reference

Teams
- Washington Senators (1906, 1908)

Robert E. Edmondson (April 10, 1879 – August 30, 1931) was an American professional baseball player who played outfield in the Major Leagues from 1906 to 1908 for the Washington Senators.
