= John Godwin (baseball) =

American baseball player (1877-1956)

- Infielder / Outfielder
- Born: March 10, 1877; East Liverpool, Ohio, U.S.
- Died: May 5, 1956 (aged 79); East Liverpool, Ohio, U.S.
- Batted: Right Threw: Right

MLB debut
- August 14, 1905, for the Boston Americans

Last MLB appearance
- September 17, 1906, for the Boston Americans

MLB statistics
- Batting average: .212
- Hits: 50
- Runs batted in: 25
- Stats at Baseball Reference

Teams
- Boston Americans (1905–1906)

John Godwin (born March 10, 1877, in East Liverpool, Ohio; died May 5, 1956, in E. Liverpool, Ohio), nicknamed "Bunny", was an American Major League Baseball player for the Boston Americans in 1905 and 1906.

== Sources ==
- Career statistics from Baseball Reference · Baseball Reference (Minors) · Retrosheet · Baseball Almanac
