= Rube Vinson =

American baseball player (1879–1951)

- Outfielder
- Born: March 20, 1879; Dover, Delaware, U.S.
- Died: October 12, 1951 (aged 72); Chester, Pennsylvania, U.S.
- Batted: Left Threw: Right

MLB debut
- September 27, 1904, for the Cleveland Naps

Last MLB appearance
- May 7, 1906, for the Chicago White Sox

MLB statistics
- Batting average: .227
- Home runs: 0
- Runs batted in: 14
- Stats at Baseball Reference

Teams
- Cleveland Naps (1904–1905); Chicago White Sox (1906)

Ernest Augustus "Rube" Vinson (March 20, 1879 – October 12, 1951) was an American Major League Baseball outfielder. He played for the Cleveland Naps and the Chicago White Sox.

Vinson started his professional baseball career in 1904 in the Eastern League. He was purchased by the Naps in August and played 54 games for them as a backup outfielder. He was then sold to the White Sox. In 1906, he played 10 games and batted .250 before being sent to the minor leagues. Vinson later spent two seasons in the New England League. He retired in 1910.

In 1951, Vinson fell from a two-story building while he was washing a window. He died on October 12.
