= Joe Nealon =

American baseball player (1884–1910)

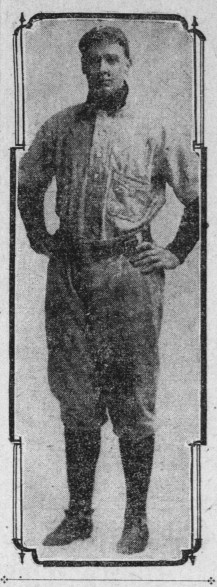
- First baseman
- Born: December 15, 1884; San Francisco, California, U.S.
- Died: April 2, 1910 (aged 25); San Francisco, California, U.S.
- Batted: Right Threw: Right

MLB debut
- April 12, 1906, for the Pittsburgh Pirates

Last MLB appearance
- September 6, 1907, for the Pittsburgh Pirates

MLB statistics
- Batting average: .256
- Hits: 240
- Runs batted in: 130
- Stats at Baseball Reference

Teams
- Pittsburgh Pirates (1906–1907)

Career highlights and awards
- NL RBI leader (1906)

James Joseph Nealon (December 15, 1884 – April 2, 1910) was a professional baseball player. He was born in San Francisco, and died in San Francisco, at the age of 25.

He was a first baseman over parts of 2 seasons (1906–1907) with the Pittsburgh Pirates. In his rookie season in 1906, he tied for the National League lead in RBIs with 83 with Harry Steinfeldt. The next year, he contracted tuberculosis, ending his baseball career. He subsequently died of typhoid pneumonia at the age of 25.

In 259 games over two seasons, Nealon posted a .256 batting average (240-for-937) with 111 runs, 31 doubles, 20 triples, 3 home runs, 130 RBI, 26 stolen bases and 76 bases on balls. Defensively, he recorded a .983 fielding percentage as a first baseman.

== See also ==
- List of Major League Baseball annual runs batted in leaders
