= Ed McFarland =

American baseball player (1874–1959)

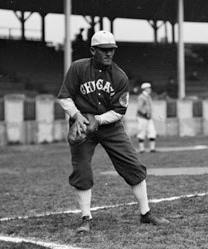
- Catcher
- Born: August 3, 1874; Cleveland, Ohio, U.S.
- Died: November 28, 1959 (aged 85); Cleveland, Ohio, U.S.
- Batted: Right Threw: Right

MLB debut
- July 7, 1893, for the Cleveland Spiders

Last MLB appearance
- June 26, 1908, for the Boston Red Sox

MLB statistics
- Batting average: .275
- Home runs: 13
- Runs batted in: 383
- Stats at Baseball Reference

Teams
- Cleveland Spiders (1893); St. Louis Browns (1896–1897); Philadelphia Phillies (1897–1901); Chicago White Sox (1902–1907); Boston Red Sox (1908)

Career highlights and awards
- World Series champion (1906)

Edward William McFarland (August 3, 1874 – November 28, 1959), born in Cleveland, Ohio, was an American catcher for the Cleveland Spiders (1893), St. Louis Browns (1896–97), Philadelphia Phillies (1897–1901), Chicago White Sox (1902–07) and Boston Red Sox (1908). He helped the White Sox win the 1906 World Series.

In 12 seasons McFarland played in 894 Games and had 3,007 At Bats, 398 Runs, 826 Hits, 146 Doubles, 49 Triples, 13 Home Runs, 383 RBI, 65 Stolen Bases, 254 Walks, .275 Batting Average, .335 On-base percentage, .369 Slugging Percentage and 1,109 Total Bases.

He died at age 85 in his hometown from injuries resulting from an accidental fall.

== Sources ==
- Career statistics from Baseball Reference · Baseball Reference (Minors) · Retrosheet · Baseball Almanac
