= Ed Hahn =

American baseball player (1875–1941)

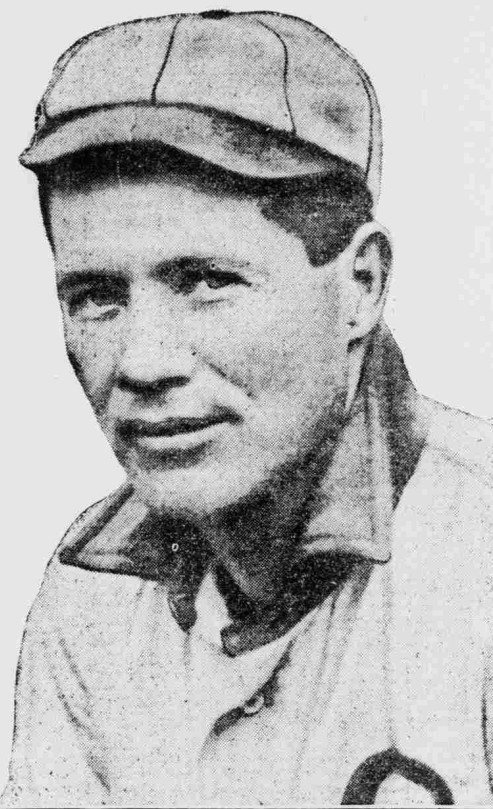
- Outfielder
- Born: August 27, 1875; Nevada, Ohio, U.S.
- Died: November 29, 1941 (aged 66); Des Moines, Iowa, U.S.
- Batted: Left Threw: Right

MLB debut
- August 29, 1905, for the New York Highlanders

Last MLB appearance
- June 5, 1910, for the Chicago White Sox

MLB statistics
- Batting average: .237
- Home runs: 1
- Runs batted in: 122
- Stats at Baseball Reference

Teams
- New York Highlanders (1905–1906); Chicago White Sox (1906–1910)

Career highlights and awards
- World Series champion (1906)

William Edgar Hahn (August 27, 1875 – November 29, 1941) was an American outfielder in Major League Baseball from 1905 to 1910. He played for the Chicago White Sox and New York Highlanders.

== Baseball career ==
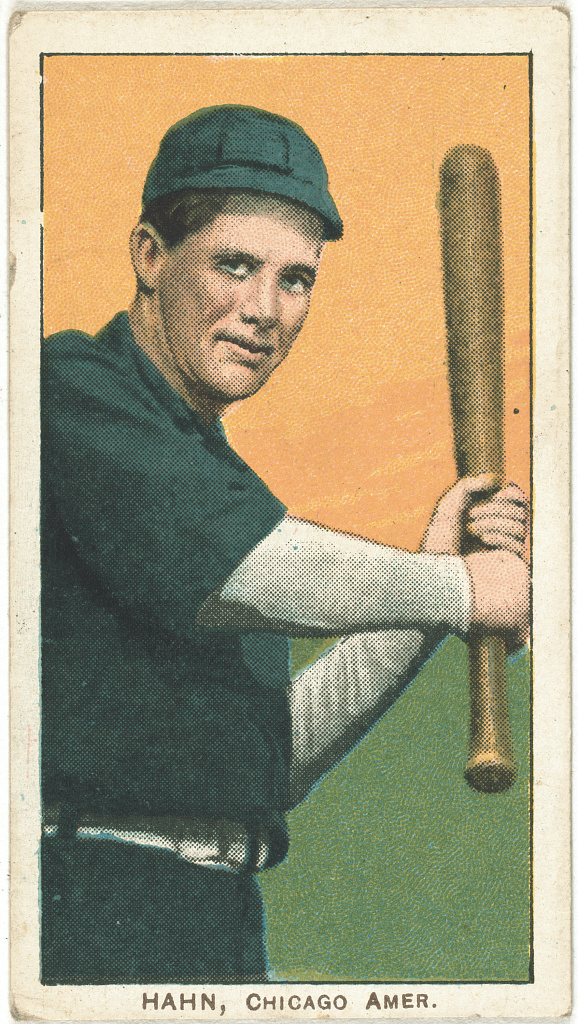
A 1909 American Tobacco Company baseball card of Ed Hahn.

Hahn, who was born in Nevada, Ohio, started his professional baseball career at the age of 27 in the Cotton States League. In August 1905, he was batting .305 for the New Orleans Pelicans and was purchased by the American League's Highlanders. He got off to a slow start in 1906 and was sold to the White Sox. He became the team's starting right fielder. Hahn batted just .227 for the season but ranked third in the league in walks (72) and hits by pitches (11). His style of play fit right in with the White Sox, who were known as "the Hitless Wonders."

The White Sox won the pennant and faced the heavily favored Chicago Cubs in the 1906 World Series. Hahn, the team's leadoff hitter, was the first batter of the series. He went 0 for 6 during the first two games. In game 3, he was hit in the face by a Jack Pfiester curveball and suffered a broken nose. He walked to the Cook County Hospital, which was a block away, for treatment. The next day, he was back on the field for game 4, wearing a rubber air hose on his nostril. He received "loud and long" cheers from the crowd at his appearance.

After getting hit, Hahn went 6 for 14 (.429) against the Cubs' pitching. He scored two runs in game 5 and two more in game 6 as the White Sox pulled off one of the biggest upsets in World Series history. It was the team's first Series win.

1907 was Hahn's best season in the major leagues. He finished in the league's top five in runs (87) scored, walks (84), and hits by pitches (12), while batting .255. He also led all outfielders with a .990 fielding percentage.

Hahn had another solid year in 1908. However, he hit poorly in 1909 and 1910 and then went down to the minors. In 1911, he was a player-manager for the Mansfield Brownies of the Ohio–Pennsylvania League. He then played five seasons for the Western League's Des Moines Boosters before retiring.

== Later life ==
Hahn had owned a pottery business during the offseasons. After his baseball days were over, he became a night watchman for a cement company plant in Des Moines, Iowa until 1940, when he was let go due to his failing health. Living in a trailer with his dog, Hahn died on November 29, 1941 at Iowa Lutheran Hospital due to complications from a stomach ulcer-related illness.
