= Joe Cassidy (baseball) =

American baseball player (1883-1906)

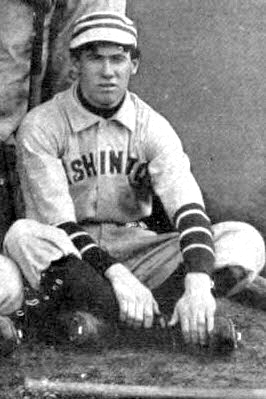
- Shortstop
- Born: February 8, 1883; Chester, Pennsylvania, U.S.
- Died: March 25, 1906 (aged 23); Chester, Pennsylvania, U.S.
- Batted: Right Threw: Right

MLB debut
- April 18, 1904, for the Washington Senators

Last MLB appearance
- October 7, 1905, for the Washington Senators

MLB statistics
- Batting average: .228
- Home runs: 2
- Runs batted in: 76
- Stats at Baseball Reference

Teams
- Washington Senators (1904–1905)

Joseph Phillip Cassidy (February 8, 1883 – March 25, 1906) was an American Major League Baseball player from Chester, Pennsylvania who mainly played shortstop for the Washington Senators from 1904 to 1905. He is the only player in American League history to record 19 triples in a rookie season. He was an alumnus of Villanova University.

Cassidy died in his hometown at age 23, from complications of malaria, and is interred at Immaculate Heart Cemetery. The Senators opened their 1906 season against the Philadelphia Athletics at Columbia Park in Philadelphia; the Senators, according to the Philadelphia Inquirer "wore on [their] sleeve a badge of mourning as a tribute to the memory of Shortstop Joe Cassidy."

== See also ==
- List of Major League Baseball annual triples leaders
- List of baseball players who died during their careers
