= 1906 Major League Baseball season =

1906 MLB season
- League: American League (AL); National League (NL)
- Sport: Baseball
- Duration: Regular season: April 14 – October 7, 1906 (AL); April 12 – October 7, 1906 (NL); World Series: October 9–14, 1906
- Games: 154
- Teams: 16 (8 per league)

Pennant Winners
- AL champions: Chicago White Sox
- AL runners-up: New York Highlanders
- NL champions: Chicago Cubs
- NL runners-up: New York Giants

World Series
- Champions: Chicago White Sox
- Runners-up: Chicago Cubs

MLB seasons
- ← 1905 1907 →

Locations of teams for the 1904–1907 American League seasons
American League
Locations of teams for the 1903–1906 National League seasons
National League

The 1906 major league baseball season began on April 12, 1906. The regular season ended on October 7, with the Chicago Cubs and Chicago White Sox as regular season champions of the National League and American League, respectively. The postseason began with Game 1 of the third modern World Series on October 9 and ended with Game 6 on October 14. The White Sox defeated the Cubs, four games to two, capturing their first championship in franchise history. Going into the season, the defending World Series champions were the New York Giants from the 1905 season.

== Schedule ==
The 1906 schedule consisted of 154 games for all teams in the American League and National League, each of which had eight teams. Each team was scheduled to play 22 games against the other seven teams of their respective league. This continued the format put in place for the 1904 season. This format would last until 1919.

National League Opening Day took place on April 12 with all teams playing, while American League Opening Day did not take place until April 14 with four teams playing. The final day of the regular season was on October 7. The World Series took place between October 9 and October 14.

== Teams ==
League	Team	City	Ballpark	Capacity	Manager
American League	Boston Americans	Boston, Massachusetts	Huntington Avenue Grounds	11,500	Jimmy Collins
American League	Boston Americans	Boston, Massachusetts	Huntington Avenue Grounds	11,500	Chick Stahl
American League	Chicago White Sox	Chicago, Illinois	South Side Park	14,000	Fielder Jones
American League	Cleveland Naps	Cleveland, Ohio	League Park (Cleveland)	9,000	Nap Lajoie
American League	Detroit Tigers	Detroit, Michigan	Bennett Park	8,500	Bill Armour
American League	New York Highlanders	New York, New York	Hilltop Park	16,000	Clark Griffith
American League	Philadelphia Athletics	Philadelphia, Pennsylvania	Columbia Park	13,600	Connie Mack
American League	St. Louis Browns	St. Louis, Missouri	Sportsman's Park	8,000	Jimmy McAleer
American League	Washington Senators	Washington, D.C.	National Park	9,000	Jake Stahl
National League	Boston Beaneaters	Boston, Massachusetts	South End Grounds	6,600	Fred Tenney
National League	Brooklyn Superbas	New York, New York	Washington Park	12,000	Patsy Donovan
National League	Chicago Cubs	Chicago, Illinois	West Side Park	14,200	Frank Chance
National League	Cincinnati Reds	Cincinnati, Ohio	Palace of the Fans	12,000	Ned Hanlon
National League	New York Giants	New York, New York	Polo Grounds	16,000	John McGraw
National League	Philadelphia Phillies	Philadelphia, Pennsylvania	National League Park	18,000	Hugh Duffy
National League	Pittsburgh Pirates	Allegheny, Pennsylvania	Exposition Park	16,000	Fred Clarke
National League	St. Louis Cardinals	St. Louis, Missouri	League Park (St. Louis)	15,200	John McCloskey

1. In today's Pittsburgh, Pennsylvania.

== Standings ==
=== American League ===
American League
Team	W	L	Pct.	GB	Home	Road
Chicago White Sox	93	58	.616	—	54‍–‍23	39‍–‍35
New York Highlanders	90	61	.596	3	53‍–‍23	37‍–‍38
Cleveland Naps	89	64	.582	5	47‍–‍30	42‍–‍34
Philadelphia Athletics	78	67	.538	12	48‍–‍23	30‍–‍44
St. Louis Browns	76	73	.510	16	40‍–‍34	36‍–‍39
Detroit Tigers	71	78	.477	21	42‍–‍34	29‍–‍44
Washington Senators	55	95	.367	37½	33‍–‍41	22‍–‍54
Boston Americans	49	105	.318	45½	22‍–‍54	27‍–‍51

=== National League ===
National League
Team	W	L	Pct.	GB	Home	Road
Chicago Cubs	116	36	.763	—	56‍–‍21	60‍–‍15
New York Giants	96	56	.632	20	51‍–‍24	45‍–‍32
Pittsburgh Pirates	93	60	.608	23½	49‍–‍27	44‍–‍33
Philadelphia Phillies	71	82	.464	45½	37‍–‍40	34‍–‍42
Brooklyn Superbas	66	86	.434	50	31‍–‍44	35‍–‍42
Cincinnati Reds	64	87	.424	51½	36‍–‍40	28‍–‍47
St. Louis Cardinals	52	98	.347	63	28‍–‍48	24‍–‍50
Boston Beaneaters	49	102	.325	66½	28‍–‍47	21‍–‍55

=== Tie games ===
20 tie games (12 in AL, 8 in NL), which are not factored into winning percentage or games behind (and were often replayed again), occurred throughout the season.

==== American League ====
- Boston Americans, 1
- Chicago White Sox, 3
- Cleveland Naps, 4
- Detroit Tigers, 2
- New York Highlanders, 4
- Philadelphia Athletics, 4
- St. Louis Browns, 5
- Washington Senators, 1

==== National League ====
- Boston Beaneaters, 1
- Brooklyn Superbas, 1
- Chicago Cubs, 3
- Cincinnati Reds, 4
- New York Giants, 1
- Philadelphia Phillies, 1
- Pittsburgh Pirates, 1
- St. Louis Cardinals, 4

== Postseason ==
The postseason began on October 9 and ended on October 14 with the Chicago White Sox defeating the Chicago Cubs in the 1906 World Series in six games.

=== Bracket ===
World Series
AL	Chicago White Sox	4
NL	Chicago Cubs	2

== Managerial changes ==
=== Off-season ===
Team	Former Manager	New Manager
Brooklyn Superbas	Ned Hanlon	Patsy Donovan
Cincinnati Reds	Joe Kelley	Ned Hanlon
St. Louis Cardinals	Stanley Robison	John McCloskey

=== In-season ===
Team	Former Manager	New Manager
Boston Americans	Jimmy Collins	Chick Stahl

== League leaders ==
Any team shown in small text indicates a previous team a player was on during the season.

=== American League ===
Hitting leaders
Stat	Player	Total
AVG	George Stone (SLB)	.358
OPS	George Stone (SLB)	.918
HR	Harry Davis (PHA)	12
RBI	Harry Davis (PHA)	96
R	Elmer Flick (CLE)	98
H	Nap Lajoie (CLE)	214
SB	John Anderson (WSH); Elmer Flick (CLE)	39

Pitching leaders
Stat	Player	Total
W	Al Orth (NYH)	27
L	Joe Harris (BOS); Cy Young (BOS)	21
ERA	Doc White (CWS)	1.52
K	Rube Waddell (PHA)	196
IP	Al Orth (NYH)	338.2
SV	Charles Bender (PHA); Otto Hess (CLE)	3
WHIP	Doc White (CWS)	0.903

=== National League ===
Hitting leaders
Stat	Player	Total
AVG	Honus Wagner (PIT)	.339
OPS	Honus Wagner (PIT)	.875
HR	Tim Jordan (BRO)	12
RBI	Joe Nealon (PIT); Harry Steinfeldt (CHC)	83
R	Frank Chance (CHC); Honus Wagner (PIT)	103
H	Harry Steinfeldt (CHC)	176
SB	Frank Chance (CHC)	57

Pitching leaders
Stat	Player	Total
W	Joe McGinnity (NYG)	27
L	Gus Dorner (BSN/CIN)	26
ERA	Mordecai Brown (CHC)	1.04
K	Fred Beebe (STL/CHC)	171
IP	Irv Young (BSN)	358.1
SV	Cecil Ferguson (NYG)	7
WHIP	Mordecai Brown (CHC)	0.934

== Milestones ==
=== Pitchers ===
==== No-hitters ====
- Johnny Lush (PHI):
  - Lush threw his first career no-hitter and the fourth no-hitter in franchise history, by defeating the Brooklyn Superbas 6–0 on May 1. Lush walked three and struck out 11.
- Mal Eason (BRO):
  - Eason threw his first career no-hitter and the fifth no-hitter in franchise history, by defeating the St. Louis Cardinals 2–0 on July 20. Eason walked three and struck out five.

=== Miscellaneous ===
- Philadelphia Athletics:
  - Set a major league record for most runs scored in the 24th inning, by scoring three runs against the Boston Americans on September 1.
- Chicago Cubs:
  - Won a record 116 games while losing only 36. Their .763 winning percentage remains the highest in the modern (two-league) era. They were led offensively by third baseman Harry Steinfeldt whose 176 hits, .327 batting average and 83 RBIs were all a team-best; Steinfeldt also had 29 stolen bases. The Cubs' pitching staff consisted of Ed Reulbach, Carl Lundgren, Mordecai Brown and left-hander Jack Pfiester.

== Home field attendance ==
Team name	Wins	%±	Home attendance	%±	Per game
Chicago Cubs	116	26.1%	654,300	28.3%	8,282
Chicago White Sox	93	1.1%	585,202	−14.9%	7,408
Philadelphia Athletics	78	−15.2%	489,129	−11.8%	6,700
New York Highlanders	90	26.8%	434,700	40.6%	5,720
Boston Americans	49	−37.2%	410,209	−12.5%	5,327
New York Giants	96	−8.6%	402,850	−27.1%	5,371
Pittsburgh Pirates	93	−3.1%	394,877	7.0%	5,128
St. Louis Browns	76	40.7%	389,157	14.8%	5,120
Cincinnati Reds	64	−19.0%	330,056	5.1%	4,231
Cleveland Naps	89	17.1%	325,733	3.0%	4,123
Philadelphia Phillies	71	−14.5%	294,680	−7.3%	3,827
St. Louis Cardinals	52	−10.3%	283,770	−3.1%	3,685
Brooklyn Superbas	66	37.5%	277,400	21.7%	3,650
Detroit Tigers	71	−10.1%	174,043	−10.0%	2,231
Boston Beaneaters	49	−3.9%	143,280	−4.5%	1,885
Washington Senators	55	−14.1%	129,903	−48.5%	1,732

== See also ==
- 1906 in baseball (Events, Births, Deaths)
