= Danny Hoffman =

American baseball player (1880-1922)

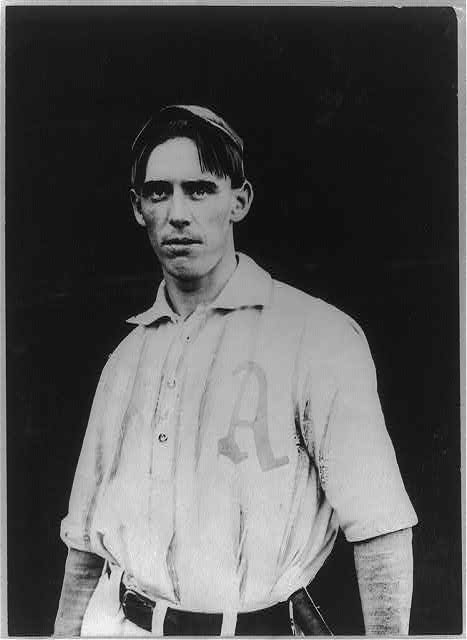
- Hoffman in 1906
- Center fielder
- Born: March 2, 1880; Canton, Connecticut, U.S.
- Died: March 14, 1922 (aged 42); Manchester, Connecticut, U.S.
- Batted: Left Threw: Left

MLB debut
- April 20, 1903, for the Philadelphia Athletics

Last MLB appearance
- May 25, 1911, for the St. Louis Browns

MLB statistics
- Batting average: .256
- Runs batted in: 235
- Stolen bases: 185
- Stats at Baseball Reference

Teams
- Philadelphia Athletics (1903–1906); New York Highlanders (1906–1907); St. Louis Browns (1908–1911)

Career highlights and awards
- AL stolen base leader (1905)

Daniel John Hoffman (March 2, 1880 – March 14, 1922) was an American professional baseball player who played center field in the Major Leagues from 1903 to 1911. During his career Hoffman played for the Philadelphia Athletics, New York Highlanders, and St. Louis Browns.

Hoffman was a native of Canton, Connecticut, where he played youth baseball in the village of Collinsville. A scout signed him to play minor league baseball. When playing for the Springfield Ponies in 1902, they were playing a road game against Bridgeport. Hoffman batted a ball into the outfield, which struck and killed a horse.

In 829 games over nine seasons, Hoffman posted a .256 batting average (762-for-2981) with 361 runs, 71 doubles, 52 triples, 14 home runs, 235 RBIs, 185 stolen bases and 226 bases on balls. Defensively, he finished his career with a .951 fielding percentage playing at all three outfield positions.

Hoffman died at this home in Manchester, Connecticut on March 14, 1922.

== See also ==
- List of Major League Baseball annual stolen base leaders
