= Joe Harris (pitcher) =

American baseball player (1882-1966)

- Pitcher
- Born: February 1, 1882; Melrose, Massachusetts, U.S.
- Died: April 12, 1966 (aged 84); Melrose, Massachusetts, U.S.
- Batted: Right Threw: Right

MLB debut
- September 22, 1905, for the Boston Americans

Last MLB appearance
- October 5, 1907, for the Boston Americans

MLB statistics
- Win–loss record: 3–30
- Earned run average: 3.35
- Strikeouts: 137
- Stats at Baseball Reference

Teams
- Boston Americans (1905–1907)

Career highlights and awards
- Led American League in losses (21), 1906

Joseph White Harris (February 1, 1882 – April 12, 1966) was an American pitcher in Major League Baseball who played from 1905 through 1907 for the Boston Americans. Listed at 6 ft 1 in (1.85 m), 198 lb., Harris batted and threw right-handed. He was born in Melrose, Massachusetts.

In a three-season career, Harris posted a 3–30 record with a 3.35 ERA in 45 appearances, including 32 starts, 26 complete games, one shutout, 12 games finished, two saves, 137 strikeouts, 88 walks, and 317.0 innings of work.

On September 1, 1906, Harris earned the distinction of pitching the longest game in Red Sox (Americans) history. The game lasted 24 innings, with the Red Sox eventually losing 4-1 to the Philadelphia Athletics.

Harris died in his home of Melrose, Massachusetts, at age 84 and is buried in Wyoming Cemetery there.

== Sources ==
- Baseball Reference
- Retrosheet
