= 1906 in baseball =

The following are the baseball events of the year 1906 throughout the world.

== Champions ==
- World Series: Chicago White Sox over Chicago Cubs (4–2)

== Statistical leaders ==
Any team shown in small text indicates a previous team a player was on during the season.

	American League		National League	
Stat	Player	Total	Player	Tota
AVG	George Stone (SLB)	.358	Honus Wagner (PIT)	.339
HR	Harry Davis (PHA)	12	Tim Jordan (BRO)	12
RBI	Harry Davis (PHA)	96	Joe Nealon (PIT); Harry Steinfeldt (CHC)	83
W	Al Orth (NYH)	27	Joe McGinnity (NYG)	27
ERA	Doc White (CWS)	1.52	Mordecai Brown (CHC)	1.04
K	Rube Waddell (PHA)	196	Fred Beebe (STL/CHC)	171

== Major league baseball final standings ==
=== American League final standings ===
American League
Team	W	L	Pct.	GB	Home	Road
Chicago White Sox	93	58	.616	—	54‍–‍23	39‍–‍35
New York Highlanders	90	61	.596	3	53‍–‍23	37‍–‍38
Cleveland Naps	89	64	.582	5	47‍–‍30	42‍–‍34
Philadelphia Athletics	78	67	.538	12	48‍–‍23	30‍–‍44
St. Louis Browns	76	73	.510	16	40‍–‍34	36‍–‍39
Detroit Tigers	71	78	.477	21	42‍–‍34	29‍–‍44
Washington Senators	55	95	.367	37½	33‍–‍41	22‍–‍54
Boston Americans	49	105	.318	45½	22‍–‍54	27‍–‍51

Locations of teams for the 1904–1907 American League seasons
American League

=== National League final standings ===
National League
Team	W	L	Pct.	GB	Home	Road
Chicago Cubs	116	36	.763	—	56‍–‍21	60‍–‍15
New York Giants	96	56	.632	20	51‍–‍24	45‍–‍32
Pittsburgh Pirates	93	60	.608	23½	49‍–‍27	44‍–‍33
Philadelphia Phillies	71	82	.464	45½	37‍–‍40	34‍–‍42
Brooklyn Superbas	66	86	.434	50	31‍–‍44	35‍–‍42
Cincinnati Reds	64	87	.424	51½	36‍–‍40	28‍–‍47
St. Louis Cardinals	52	98	.347	63	28‍–‍48	24‍–‍50
Boston Beaneaters	49	102	.325	66½	28‍–‍47	21‍–‍55

Locations of teams for the 1903–1906 National League seasons
National League

== Events ==
- May 8 – Philadelphia Athletics manager Connie Mack needed a substitute outfielder in the sixth inning of a game against the Boston Americans and called on pitcher Chief Bender to fill in. Bender hit two home runs, both inside the park.
- May 17 – Ty Cobb hits a bunt to break up the no hitter being thrown by A's pitcher Rube Waddell. The A's go on to defeat the Tigers 5–0.
- July 4 – Mordecai Brown of the Chicago Cubs defeats Lefty Leifield of the Pittsburgh Pirates, 1–0, in which both pitchers allowed only one hit. Leifield recorded the only hit for Pittsburgh. This was the first double one-hitter in MLB history in the modern era (since 1901), and one of four double one-hitters ever pitched.
- July 20 – Mal Eason tosses a no hitter for the Brooklyn Superbas, as they defeat the St. Louis Cardinals, 2–0.
- August 1 – Brooklyn Superbas pitcher Harry McIntire would not allow a hit to the Pittsburgh Pirates through 10 innings, only to allow a single with two outs in the 11th inning. McIntire would allow three more hits before the Pirates outlasted the Superbas, 1–0, in 13 innings.
- August 3 – At Sportsman's Park, Long Tom Hughes of the Washington Senators and Fred Glade of the St. Louis Browns entered the 10th inning with a scoreless tie, until Hughes decided the game with a solo home run to a 1–0 victory, becoming the first pitcher in major league history to pitch a shutout and hit a home run which accounted for the only run in the game.
- September 1 – The Philadelphia Athletics Jack Coombs and the Boston Americans' Joe Harris each pitch all 24 innings of the A's 4–1 victory over the Pilgrims at Boston's Huntingdon Avenue Grounds. Coombs and Harris still hold the American League record. The major league record is held by the Brooklyn Dodgers' Leon Cadore and Boston Braves' Joe Oeschger, who battled to a 26-inning, 1–1 deadlock on May 1, 1920.
- September 26 – After being held scoreless for 48 consecutive innings, the Philadelphia Athletics finally score on a two-run double by Harry Davis, but still lose to the Cleveland Naps, 5–3.
- October 14 – In perhaps the greatest upset in World Series history, the Chicago White Sox (93 wins) defeated the Chicago Cubs (116 wins), 8–3, in Game 6, winning the World Championship, four games to two, despite hitting only .198 and committing 15 errors in the series.

== Births ==
=== January ===
- January 3 – Gus Suhr
- January 4 – Blondy Ryan
- January 9 – Harry Else
- January 19 – Rip Radcliff
- January 21 – Glenn Chapman
- January 24 – Stu Clarke
- January 26 – Charlie Gelbert
- January 28 – Lyn Lary

=== February ===
- February 7 – Art Jones
- February 8 – Bruce Caldwell
- February 13 – Harry Kelley
- February 15 – Bob Cremins
- February 18 – Charles Zomphier
- February 26 – Joe Graves
- February 27 – Leroy Herrmann
- February 28 – Al Baker
- February 28 – Pete Daglia

=== March ===
- March 2 – Woody English
- March 2 – Mike Powers
- March 9 – Hughie Wise
- March 10 – Art Herring
- March 11 – Bill Lawrence
- March 12 – Rusty Saunders
- March 12 – Bud Tinning
- March 13 – Ike Powers
- March 16 – Lloyd Waner
- March 17 – Hy Vandenberg
- March 21 – Shanty Hogan
- March 22 – Marv Owen
- March 22 – Moose Solters
- March 22 – Overton Tremper
- March 24 – Pat Veltman
- March 27 – Fred Tauby

=== April ===
- April 2 – Bob Way
- April 6 – Benny Frey
- April 10 – Howdy Groskloss
- April 13 – Roxie Lawson
- April 16 – Tommy Sewell
- April 17 – Eddie Delker
- April 23 – Ray Starr
- April 24 – Red Worthington

=== May ===
- May 7 – Syd Cohen
- May 10 – Gene Connell
- May 12 – Charlie Butler
- May 17 – Al Eckert
- May 21 – Hank Johnson
- May 23 – Pat Creeden
- May 23 – Willis Hudlin
- May 25 – Martín Dihigo
- May 30 – Hugh Willingham
- May 30 – Norman Yokely

=== June ===
- June 4 – Doc Marshall
- June 15 – Monte Weaver
- June 19 – Buck Stanton
- June 21 – Randy Moore
- June 21 – Art Smith
- June 21 – Russ Van Atta
- June 23 – Ray Foley
- June 25 – Joe Kuhel
- June 27 – Dick Terwilliger

=== July ===
- July 7 – Dick Bass
- July 7 – Satchel Paige
- July 9 – Johnny Vergez
- July 10 – Ad Liska
- July 10 – Hal McKain
- July 19 – Jackie Hayes
- July 28 – Ray Dobens
- July 30 – Johnnie Tyler

=== August ===
- August 1 – Frank Bushey
- August 2 – Bill Posedel
- August 6 – Ed Crowley
- August 6 – Chad Kimsey
- August 8 – Tot Pressnell
- August 13 – Cliff Garrison
- August 13 – Carlos Moore
- August 13 – Art Shires
- August 13 – Kemp Wicker
- August 15 – Red Peery
- August 17 – Hub Walker
- August 19 – Tex Carleton
- August 20 – Lee Riley
- August 26 – Elmer Klumpp
- August 29 – Jonah Goldman
- August 29 – Alex Hooks
- August 30 – Bob Friedrichs

=== September ===
- September 4 – Jim Mooney
- September 8 – Frank Stewart
- September 13 – Thornton Lee
- September 13 – Jim Levey
- September 15 – Charlie Biggs
- September 15 – Tip Tobin
- September 19 – Cap Clark
- September 25 – Harris McGalliard
- September 27 – John Smith
- September 28 – Dick Barrett
- September 30 – Frank Lamanske

=== October ===
- October 5 – Si Johnson
- October 11 – Tom Carey
- October 12 – Joe Cronin
- October 15 – Sammy Byrd
- October 17 – Paul Derringer
- October 18 – Wally Millies
- October 24 – Pete McClanahan
- October 28 – Ed Clough
- October 30 – Roy Joiner

=== November ===
- November 1 – Pete Rambo
- November 1 – Heinie Schuble
- November 2 – Tim McKeithan
- November 7 – Alan Strange
- November 9 – Fred Brickell
- November 11 – George Detore
- November 12 – Red Evans
- November 15 – Gene Rye
- November 16 – Ab Wright
- November 17 – Rollie Stiles
- November 20 – Joe Ogrodowski
- November 23 – Biggs Wehde

=== December ===
- December 2 – Johnny Welch
- December 5 – Lin Storti
- December 7 – Tony Piet
- December 10 – Bots Nekola
- December 15 – Tom Kane
- December 15 – Bucky Williams
- December 18 – Dick Coffman
- December 19 – Tom Sullivan
- December 28 – Tommy Bridges
- December 30 – Ray Prim

== Deaths ==
- January 26 – Fred Underwood, 37, pitcher for the 1894 Brooklyn Grooms;
- February 16 – Yale Murphy, 36, shortstop and outfielder who played from 1894 through 1897 for the New York Giants.
- February 18 – Charlie Ingraham, 45, catcher for the 1883 Baltimore Orioles.
- February 27 – John Peltz, 44, outfielder who played with the Indianapolis Hoosiers, Baltimore Orioles, Brooklyn Gladiators, Syracuse Stars and Toledo Maumees between the 1884 and 1890 seasons.
- March 25 – Joe Cassidy, 23, shortstop for the Senators since 1904 who led AL with 19 triples as a rookie, led league in assists in 1905.
- March 27 – Toad Ramsey, 41, pitcher for Louisville who topped 35 wins in both 1886 and 1887, with strikeout totals of 499 and 355.
- June 14 – Mike Sullivan, 39, pitcher who posted a 54–65 record and a 5.04 ERA with eight teams from 1889 to 1899.
- June 15 – Sandy Nava, 56, catcher and first known Mexican American to play in the Majors.
- June 24 – Joe Strauss, 47, left fielder/catcher/pitcher for the Colonels/Cowboys/Grays from 1884 to 1886.
- August 16 – Tom Carey, 60, 19th century infielder and player-manager.
- October 20 – Buck Ewing, 47, catcher, most notably for the New York Giants, who batted .303 lifetime and led NL in home runs and triples once each; captain of 1888–1889 NL champions batted .346 in 1888. championship series; in 1883 was one of the first two players to hit 10 home runs in a season; led NL in assists three times and double plays twice, was later Cincinnati manager.
- September – Matthew Porter, 47, player-manager for the 1884 Kansas City Cowboys of the Union Association.
- August 31 – Alex Voss, 48, utility for the Nationals and Cowboys in the 1884 season.
- September 22 – George Davies, 38, pitcher who posted an 18–24 record and a 3.32 ERA for the Spiders, Brewers and Giants from 1891 to 1893.
- November 22 – Tom Cotter, 40, catcher who played six games for the 1891 Boston Reds.
- October 25 – Marty Swandell, 65, infielder/outfielder for the Eckfords and Resolutes from 1872 to 1873.
- November 22 – Tom Cotter, 40, catcher for the 1891 Champions Boston Reds.
- November 27 – Julius Willigrod, 49, outfielder/shortstop who played with the Wolverines and Blues in the 1882 season.
- December 19 – Ed Pinkham, 60, third baseman for the 1871 Chicago White Stockings.
- December 30 – Henry Porter, 48, pitcher for three teams in the 1880s, who set a major league record for an 18-strikeout game for a losing pitcher in 1884 and also threw a no-hitter in 1888.
