= 1905 St. Louis Browns season =

Major League Baseball season

1905 St. Louis Browns
- League: American League
- Ballpark: Sportsman's Park
- City: St. Louis, Missouri
- Record: 54–99 (.353)
- League place: 8th
- Owners: Robert Hedges
- Managers: Jimmy McAleer

In the 1905 St. Louis Browns season they finished 8th in the American League with a record of 54 wins and 99 losses.

== Offseason ==
- December 26, 1904: Jesse Burkett was traded by the Browns to the Boston Americans for George Stone and cash.
- February 1905: The Browns traded a player to be named later to the Chicago White Sox for Branch Rickey. The Browns completed the deal by sending Frank Roth to the White Sox in June.

== Regular season ==
=== Season standings ===
American League
Team	W	L	Pct.	GB	Home	Road
Philadelphia Athletics	92	56	.622	—	51‍–‍22	41‍–‍34
Chicago White Sox	92	60	.605	2	50‍–‍29	42‍–‍31
Detroit Tigers	79	74	.516	15½	45‍–‍30	34‍–‍44
Boston Americans	78	74	.513	16	44‍–‍32	34‍–‍42
Cleveland Naps	76	78	.494	19	41‍–‍36	35‍–‍42
New York Highlanders	71	78	.477	21½	40‍–‍35	31‍–‍43
Washington Senators	64	87	.424	29½	33‍–‍42	31‍–‍45
St. Louis Browns	54	99	.353	40½	34‍–‍42	20‍–‍57

=== Record vs. opponents ===
1905 American League record Sources:
Team	BOS	CWS	CLE	DET	NYH	PHA	SLB	WSH
Boston	—	6–16–1	14–8	10–12	13–8	7–15	15–7	13–8
Chicago	16–6–1	—	13–9	11–11–1	15–7–1	9–12–1	14–7–1	14–8–1
Cleveland	8–14	9–13	—	12–10	12–10	7–15	14–8–1	14–8
Detroit	12–10	11–11–1	10–12	—	13–8	9–13	13–9	11–11
New York	8–13	7–15–1	10–12	8–13	—	8–11–1	15–7	15–7–1
Philadelphia	15–7	12–9–1	15–7	13–9	11–8–1	—	15–7–1	11–9–1
St. Louis	7–15	7–14–1	8–14–1	9–13	7–15	7–15–1	—	9–13
Washington	8–13	8–14–1	8–14	11–11	7–15–1	9–11–1	13–9	—

=== Roster ===
1905 St. Louis Browns
Roster
Pitchers: Harry Ables; Jim Buchanan; Fred Glade; Harry Howell; Cy Morgan; Barney Pelty; Jack Powell; Willie Sudhoff	Catchers: Charlie Gibson; Branch Rickey; Frank Roth; Tubby Spencer; Joe Sugden; Art Weaver; Infielders: Harry Gleason; Tom Jones; Charles Moran; Dick Padden; Ike Rockenfield; Charlie Starr; Bobby Wallace	Outfielders: Emil Frisk; Ben Koehler; George Stone; Ike Van Zandt	Manager: Jimmy McAleer

== Player stats ==
=== Batting ===
==== Starters by position ====
Note: Pos = Position; G = Games played; AB = At bats; H = Hits; Avg. = Batting average; HR = Home runs; RBI = Runs batted in

Pos	Player	G	AB	H	Avg.	HR	RBI
C	Joe Sugden	90	266	46	.173	0	23
1B	Tom Jones	135	504	122	.242	0	48
2B	Ike Rockenfield	95	322	70	.217	0	16
SS	Bobby Wallace	156	587	159	.271	1	59
3B	Harry Gleason	150	535	116	.217	1	57
OF	George Stone	155	635	189	.298	7	52
OF	Emil Frisk	124	429	112	.261	3	36
OF	Ben Koehler	142	536	127	.237	2	47

==== Other batters ====
Note: G = Games played; AB = At bats; H = Hits; Avg. = Batting average; HR = Home runs; RBI = Runs batted in

Player	G	AB	H	Avg.	HR	RBI
Ike Van Zandt	94	322	75	.233	1	20
Tubby Spencer	35	115	27	.235	0	11
Frank Roth	35	107	25	.234	0	7
Charlie Starr	26	97	20	.206	0	6
Art Weaver	28	92	11	.120	0	3
Charles Moran	27	82	16	.195	0	5
Dick Padden	16	58	10	.172	0	4
Charlie Gibson	1	3	0	.000	0	0
Branch Rickey	1	3	0	.000	0	0

=== Pitching ===
==== Starting pitchers ====
Note: G = Games pitched; IP = Innings pitched; W = Wins; L = Losses; ERA = Earned run average; SO = Strikeouts

Player	G	IP	W	L	ERA	SO
Harry Howell	38	323.0	6	25	2.81	127
Fred Glade	32	275.0	6	25	2.81	127
Barney Pelty	31	258.2	14	14	2.75	114
Willie Sudhoff	32	244.0	10	20	2.99	70
Jack Powell	3	28.0	2	1	1.61	12

==== Other pitchers ====
Note: G = Games pitched; IP = Innings pitched; W = Wins; L = Losses; ERA = Earned run average; SO = Strikeouts

Player	G	IP	W	L	ERA	SO
Jim Buchanan	22	141.1	5	9	3.50	54
Cy Morgan	13	77.1	2	5	3.61	44
Harry Ables	6	30.2	0	3	3.82	11

==== Relief pitchers ====
Note: G = Games pitched; W = Wins; L = Losses; SV = Saves; ERA = Earned run average; SO = Strikeouts

Player	G	W	L	SV	ERA	SO
Ike Van Zandt	1	0	0	0	0.00	3
