= 1907 St. Louis Browns season =

Major League Baseball season

1907 St. Louis Browns
- League: American League
- Ballpark: Sportsman's Park
- City: St. Louis, Missouri
- Record: 69–83 (.454)
- League place: 6th
- Owners: Robert Hedges
- Managers: Jimmy McAleer

The 1907 St. Louis Browns season was a season in American baseball. It involved the Browns finishing 6th in the American League with a record of 69 wins and 83 losses.

== Regular season ==
=== Season standings ===
American League
Team	W	L	Pct.	GB	Home	Road
Detroit Tigers	92	58	.613	—	50‍–‍27	42‍–‍31
Philadelphia Athletics	88	57	.607	1½	50‍–‍20	38‍–‍37
Chicago White Sox	87	64	.576	5½	48‍–‍29	39‍–‍35
Cleveland Naps	85	67	.559	8	46‍–‍31	39‍–‍36
New York Highlanders	70	78	.473	21	32‍–‍41	38‍–‍37
St. Louis Browns	69	83	.454	24	36‍–‍40	33‍–‍43
Boston Americans	59	90	.396	32½	34‍–‍41	25‍–‍49
Washington Senators	49	102	.325	43½	26‍–‍48	23‍–‍54

=== Record vs. opponents ===
1907 American League record Sources:
Team	BOS	CWS	CLE	DET	NYH	PHA	SLB	WSH
Boston	—	10–11–3	8–13	6–16	8–12–1	8–14–2	10–12	9–12
Chicago	11–10–3	—	10–11–1	13–9–1	12–10	10–12–1	16–6	15–6
Cleveland	13–8	11–10–1	—	11–11–1	15–7	8–14	12–10–2	15–7–2
Detroit	16–6	9–13–1	11–11–1	—	13–8	11–8–1	14–8	18–4
New York	12–8–1	10–12	7–15	8–13	—	10–9–1	8–14–1	15–7–1
Philadelphia	14–8–2	12–10–1	14–8	8–11–1	9–10–1	—	14–6	17–4
St. Louis	12–10	6–16	10–12–2	8–14	14–8–1	6–14	—	13–9
Washington	12–9	6–15	7–15–2	4–18	7–15–1	4–17	9–13	—

=== Roster ===
1907 St. Louis Browns
Roster
Pitchers: Bill Bailey; Bill Dinneen; Fred Glade; Harry Howell; Beany Jacobson; Bill McGill; Cy Morgan; Barney Pelty; Jack Powell	Catchers: Fritz Buelow; Jack O'Connor; Tubby Spencer; Jim Stephens; Infielders: Kid Butler; Jim Delahanty; Roy Hartzell; Tom Jones; Harry Niles; Bobby Wallace; Joe Yeager	Outfielders: Charlie Hemphill; Ollie Pickering; George Stone; Other batters: Emil Frisk; Jimmy McAleer	Manager: Jimmy McAleer

== Player stats ==
=== Batting ===
==== Starters by position ====
Note: Pos = Position; G = Games played; AB = At bats; H = Hits; Avg. = Batting average; HR = Home runs; RBI = Runs batted in

Pos	Player	G	AB	H	Avg.	HR	RBI
C	Tubby Spencer	71	230	61	.265	1	25
1B	Tom Jones	155	549	137	.250	0	34
2B	Harry Niles	120	492	142	.289	2	35
SS	Bobby Wallace	147	538	138	.257	0	70
3B	Joe Yeager	123	436	104	.239	1	44
OF	George Stone	155	596	191	.320	4	59
OF	Ollie Pickering	151	576	159	.276	0	60
OF	Charlie Hemphill	153	603	156	.259	0	38

==== Other batters ====
Note: G = Games played; AB = At bats; H = Hits; Avg. = Batting average; HR = Home runs; RBI = Runs batted in

Player	G	AB	H	Avg.	HR	RBI
Roy Hartzell	60	220	52	.236	0	13
Jim Stephens	58	173	35	.202	0	11
Jim Delahanty	33	95	21	.221	0	6
Jack O'Connor	24	89	14	.157	0	4
Fritz Buelow	26	75	11	.147	0	1
Kid Butler	20	59	13	.220	0	6
Emil Frisk	5	4	1	.250	0	0
Jimmy McAleer	2	0	0	----	0	0

=== Pitching ===
==== Starting pitchers ====
Note: G = Games pitched; IP = Innings pitched; W = Wins; L = Losses; ERA = Earned run average; SO = Strikeouts

Player	G	IP	W	L	ERA	SO
Harry Howell	42	316.1	16	15	1.93	118
Barney Pelty	36	273.0	12	21	2.57	85
Jack Powell	32	255.2	13	16	2.68	96
Fred Glade	24	202.0	13	9	2.67	71
Beany Jacobson	7	57.1	1	6	2.98	16
Bill Bailey	6	48.1	4	1	2.42	17
Bill McGill	2	18.1	1	0	3.44	8

==== Other pitchers ====
Note: G = Games pitched; IP = Innings pitched; W = Wins; L = Losses; ERA = Earned run average; SO = Strikeouts

Player	G	IP	W	L	ERA	SO
Bill Dinneen	24	155.1	7	10	2.43	38
Cy Morgan	10	55.0	2	5	6.05	14
