= 1905 Philadelphia Athletics season =

1905 Philadelphia Athletics
- American League champions
- League: American League
- Ballpark: Columbia Park
- City: Philadelphia
- Record: 92–56 (.622)
- League place: 1st
- Owners: Benjamin Shibe; Tom Shibe; John Shibe; Connie Mack; Sam Jones; Frank Hough
- Managers: Connie Mack

The 1905 Philadelphia Athletics season was a season in American baseball. The team finished first in the American League with a record of 92 wins and 56 losses, winning their second pennant. They went on to face the New York Giants in the 1905 World Series, losing 4 games to 1.

The pitching staff featured three future Hall of Famers: Rube Waddell, Eddie Plank, and Chief Bender. Waddell easily won the pitching triple crown in 1905, with 27 wins, 287 strikeouts, and a 1.48 earned run average.

== Preseason ==
=== 1905 Philadelphia City Series ===
The Athletics played eight games against the Philadelphia Phillies for the local championship in the pre-season city series. The Athletics and Phillies tied in the series, 4 games to 4.

Two games scheduled for April 5, 1905 at the Phillies' Philadelphia Ball Park, and for April 6, 1905 at the Athletics' Columbia Park were called off on account of wet grounds.

AL Philadelphia Athletics (4) vs. NL Philadelphia Phillies (4)

Game	Date	Score	Location	Time	Attendance
1	April 1, 1905	Philadelphia Phillies – 0, Philadelphia Athletics – 4	Columbia Park	1:40	14,830
2	April 3, 1905	Philadelphia Athletics – 3, Philadelphia Phillies – 2	Philadelphia Ball Park	1:45	4,642
3	April 4, 1905	Philadelphia Phillies – 4, Philadelphia Athletics – 3	Columbia Park	1:40	2,451
4	April 7, 1905	Philadelphia Phillies – 1, Philadelphia Athletics – 6	Columbia Park	1:30	1,905
5	April 8, 1905	Philadelphia Athletics – 1, Philadelphia Phillies – 3	Philadelphia Ball Park	1:35	4,372
6	April 10, 1905	Philadelphia Athletics – 5, Philadelphia Phillies – 1	Philadelphia Ball Park	1:40	2,896
7	April 11, 1905	Philadelphia Phillies – 8, Philadelphia Athletics – 5	Columbia Park	1:45	1,874
8	April 12, 1905	Philadelphia Athletics – 0, Philadelphia Phillies – 5	Philadelphia Ball Park	1:40	1,975

The A's all-time record against the Phillies was 14–14 through 1905.

== Regular season ==
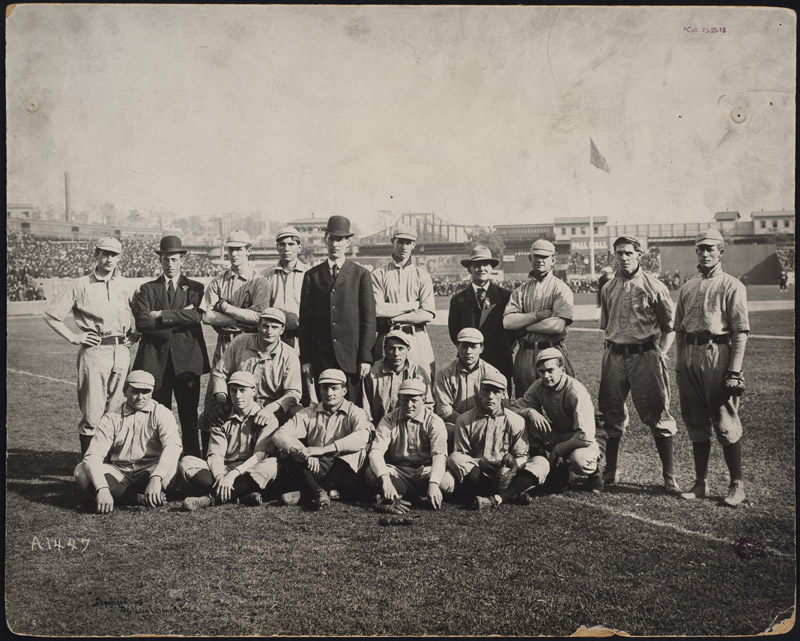
The Athletics at the Polo Grounds before a World Series game.

The A's offense scored the most runs in the league. Slugger Harry Davis led all players in home runs, runs scored, and runs batted in.

=== Season standings ===
American League
Team	W	L	Pct.	GB	Home	Road
Philadelphia Athletics	92	56	.622	—	51‍–‍22	41‍–‍34
Chicago White Sox	92	60	.605	2	50‍–‍29	42‍–‍31
Detroit Tigers	79	74	.516	15½	45‍–‍30	34‍–‍44
Boston Americans	78	74	.513	16	44‍–‍32	34‍–‍42
Cleveland Naps	76	78	.494	19	41‍–‍36	35‍–‍42
New York Highlanders	71	78	.477	21½	40‍–‍35	31‍–‍43
Washington Senators	64	87	.424	29½	33‍–‍42	31‍–‍45
St. Louis Browns	54	99	.353	40½	34‍–‍42	20‍–‍57

=== Record vs. opponents ===
1905 American League record Sources:
Team	BOS	CWS	CLE	DET	NYH	PHA	SLB	WSH
Boston	—	6–16–1	14–8	10–12	13–8	7–15	15–7	13–8
Chicago	16–6–1	—	13–9	11–11–1	15–7–1	9–12–1	14–7–1	14–8–1
Cleveland	8–14	9–13	—	12–10	12–10	7–15	14–8–1	14–8
Detroit	12–10	11–11–1	10–12	—	13–8	9–13	13–9	11–11
New York	8–13	7–15–1	10–12	8–13	—	8–11–1	15–7	15–7–1
Philadelphia	15–7	12–9–1	15–7	13–9	11–8–1	—	15–7–1	11–9–1
St. Louis	7–15	7–14–1	8–14–1	9–13	7–15	7–15–1	—	9–13
Washington	8–13	8–14–1	8–14	11–11	7–15–1	9–11–1	13–9	—

=== Birth of the Elephant mascot ===
After New York Giants' manager John McGraw told reporters that Philadelphia manufacturer Ben Shibe, who owned the controlling interest in the Athletics, had a "white elephant on his hands", manager Connie Mack defiantly adopted the white elephant as the team mascot, and presented McGraw with a stuffed toy elephant at the start of the 1905 World Series. McGraw and Mack had known each other for years, and McGraw accepted it graciously.

=== Roster ===
1905 Philadelphia Athletics
Roster
Pitchers: Chief Bender; Andy Coakley; Jimmy Dygert; Weldon Henley; Joseph Myers; Eddie Plank; Rube Waddell	Catchers: Harry Barton; Doc Powers; Ossee Schreckengost; Infielders: Lave Cross; Monte Cross; Harry Davis; John Knight; Danny Murphy	Outfielders: Topsy Hartsel; Danny Hoffman; Bris Lord; Socks Seybold	Manager: Connie Mack

== Player stats ==
= Indicates team leader

=== Batting ===
==== Starters by position ====
Note: Pos = Position; G = Games played; AB = At bats; H = Hits; Avg. = Batting average; HR = Home runs; RBI = Runs batted in

Pos	Player	G	AB	H	Avg.	HR	RBI
C	Ossee Schreckengost	123	420	114	.271	0	45
1B	Harry Davis	150	607	173	.285	8	83
2B	Danny Murphy	151	537	149	.277	6	71
3B	Lave Cross	147	587	156	.266	0	77
SS	John Knight	88	325	66	.203	3	29
LF	Topsy Hartsel	150	538	148	.275	0	28
CF	Danny Hoffman	120	459	120	.261	1	35
RF	Socks Seybold	133	492	135	.274	6	59

==== Other batters ====
Note: G = Games played; AB = At bats; H = Hits; Avg. = Batting average; HR = Home runs; RBI = Runs batted in

Player	G	AB	H	Avg.	HR	RBI
Monte Cross	79	252	67	.266	0	24
Bris Lord	66	238	57	.239	0	13
Doc Powers	40	121	18	.149	0	10
Harry Barton	29	60	10	.167	0	3

=== Pitching ===
==== Starting pitchers ====
Note: G = Games pitched; IP = Innings pitched; W = Wins; L = Losses; ERA = Earned run average; SO = Strikeouts

Player	G	IP	W	L	ERA	SO
Eddie Plank	41	346.2	24	12	2.26	210
Rube Waddell	46	328.2	27	10	1.48	287
Andy Coakley	35	255.0	18	8	1.84	145
Weldon Henley	25	183.2	4	11	2.60	82
Joseph Myers	1	5.0	0	0	3.60	5

==== Other pitchers ====
Note: G = Games pitched; IP = Innings pitched; W = Wins; L = Losses; ERA = Earned run average; SO = Strikeouts

Player	G	IP	W	L	ERA	SO
Chief Bender	35	229.0	18	11	2.83	142
Jimmy Dygert	6	35.1	1	4	4.33	24

== 1905 World Series ==
NL New York Giants (4) vs AL Philadelphia Athletics (1)

Game	Score	Date	Location	Attendance
1	Giants – 3, Athletics – 0	October 9	Columbia Park	17,995
2	Athletics – 3, Giants – 0	October 10	Polo Grounds	24,992
3	Giants – 9, Athletics – 0	October 12	Columbia Park	10,991
4	Athletics – 0, Giants – 1	October 13	Polo Grounds	13,598
5	Athletics – 0, Giants – 2	October 14	Polo Grounds	24,187

== Awards and honors ==
=== American League top five finishers ===
Andy Coakley

- #4 earned run average (1.84)

Lave Cross

- #2 runs batted in (77)

Harry Davis

- #1 runs batted in (83)
- #1 home runs (8)
- #1 runs scored (93)
- #4 slugging percentage (.422)

Topsy Hartsel

- #1 on-base percentage (.409)
- #4 runs scored (88)
- #4 stolen bases (37)

Danny Hoffman

- #1 in stolen bases (46)

Eddie Plank

- #2 wins (24)
- #2 strikeouts (210)

Rube Waddell

- #1 wins (27)
- #1 earned run average (1.48)
- #1 strikeouts (287)
- #2 shutouts (7)
