= 1905 Washington Senators season =

1905 Washington Senators
- League: American League
- Ballpark: National Park
- City: Washington, D.C.
- Record: 64–87 (.424)
- League place: 7th
- Owners: Thomas C. Noyes
- Managers: Jake Stahl

The 1905 Washington Senators won 64 games, lost 87, and finished in seventh place in the American League. They were managed by Jake Stahl and played home games at National Park.

== Regular season ==
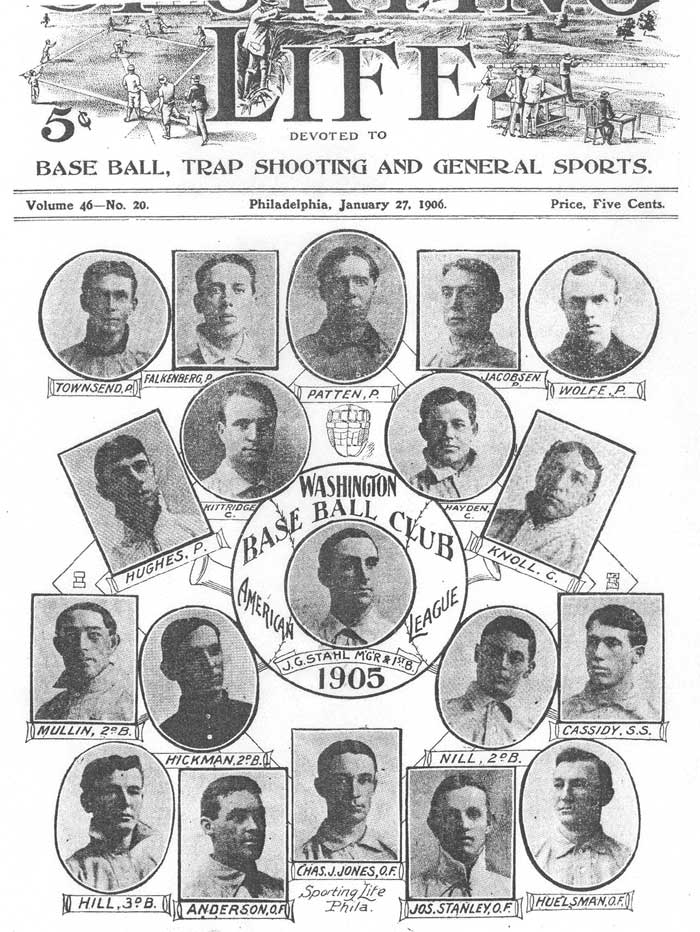

=== Season standings ===
American League
Team	W	L	Pct.	GB	Home	Road
Philadelphia Athletics	92	56	.622	—	51‍–‍22	41‍–‍34
Chicago White Sox	92	60	.605	2	50‍–‍29	42‍–‍31
Detroit Tigers	79	74	.516	15½	45‍–‍30	34‍–‍44
Boston Americans	78	74	.513	16	44‍–‍32	34‍–‍42
Cleveland Naps	76	78	.494	19	41‍–‍36	35‍–‍42
New York Highlanders	71	78	.477	21½	40‍–‍35	31‍–‍43
Washington Senators	64	87	.424	29½	33‍–‍42	31‍–‍45
St. Louis Browns	54	99	.353	40½	34‍–‍42	20‍–‍57

=== Record vs. opponents ===
1905 American League record Sources:
Team	BOS	CWS	CLE	DET	NYH	PHA	SLB	WSH
Boston	—	6–16–1	14–8	10–12	13–8	7–15	15–7	13–8
Chicago	16–6–1	—	13–9	11–11–1	15–7–1	9–12–1	14–7–1	14–8–1
Cleveland	8–14	9–13	—	12–10	12–10	7–15	14–8–1	14–8
Detroit	12–10	11–11–1	10–12	—	13–8	9–13	13–9	11–11
New York	8–13	7–15–1	10–12	8–13	—	8–11–1	15–7	15–7–1
Philadelphia	15–7	12–9–1	15–7	13–9	11–8–1	—	15–7–1	11–9–1
St. Louis	7–15	7–14–1	8–14–1	9–13	7–15	7–15–1	—	9–13
Washington	8–13	8–14–1	8–14	11–11	7–15–1	9–11–1	13–9	—

=== Roster ===
1905 Washington Senators
Roster
Pitchers: Rick Adams; Cy Falkenberg; Harry Hardy; Tom Hughes; Beany Jacobson; Moxie Manuel; Casey Patten; Happy Townsend; Barney Wolfe	Catchers: Mike Heydon; Malachi Kittridge; Infielders: Joe Cassidy; Charlie Hickman; Hunter Hill; Jim Mullen; Rabbit Nill; Jake Stahl	Outfielders: John Anderson; Harry Cassady; Frank Huelsman; Charlie Jones; Punch Knoll; Claude Rothgeb; Shag Shaughnessy; Joe Stanley; Denny Sullivan; Hughie Tate	Manager: Jake Stahl

== Player stats ==
=== Batting ===
==== Starters by position ====
Note: Pos = Position; G = Games played; AB = At bats; H = Hits; Avg. = Batting average; HR = Home runs; RBI = Runs batted in

Pos	Player	G	AB	H	Avg.	HR	RBI
C	Mike Heydon	77	245	47	.192	1	26
1B	Jake Stahl	141	501	125	.250	5	66
2B	Charlie Hickman	88	360	112	.311	2	46
3B	Hunter Hill	104	374	78	.209	1	24
SS	Joe Cassidy	151	576	124	.215	1	43
OF	Charlie Jones	142	544	113	.208	2	41
OF	John Anderson	101	400	116	.290	1	38
OF	Frank Huelsman	121	421	114	.271	3	62

==== Other batters ====
Note: G = Games played; AB = At bats; H = Hits; Avg. = Batting average; HR = Home runs; RBI = Runs batted in

Player	G	AB	H	Avg.	HR	RBI
Rabbit Nill	103	319	58	.182	3	31
Punch Knoll	79	244	52	.213	0	29
Malachi Kittridge	77	238	39	.164	0	14
Jim Mullen	50	163	31	.190	0	13
Joe Stanley	28	92	24	.261	1	17
Harry Cassady	10	30	4	.133	0	1
Claude Rothgeb	7	16	2	.125	0	0
Hughie Tate	4	13	4	.308	0	2
Denny Sullivan	3	11	0	.000	0	0
Shag Shaughnessy	1	3	0	.000	0	0

=== Pitching ===
==== Starting pitchers ====
Note: G = Games pitched; IP = Innings pitched; W = Wins; L = Losses; ERA = Earned run average; SO = Strikeouts

Player	G	IP	W	L	ERA	SO
Casey Patten	42	309.2	14	21	3.14	113
Tom Hughes	39	291.1	17	20	2.35	149
Barney Wolfe	28	182.0	9	14	2.57	52
Beany Jacobson	22	144.1	7	8	3.30	50
Cy Falkenberg	12	75.1	7	2	3.82	35

==== Other pitchers ====
Note: G = Games pitched; IP = Innings pitched; W = Wins; L = Losses; ERA = Earned run average; SO = Strikeouts

Player	G	IP	W	L	ERA	SO
Happy Townsend	34	263.0	7	16	2.63	102
Rick Adams	11	62.2	2	5	3.59	25
Harry Hardy	3	24.0	1	1	1.88	10
Moxie Manuel	3	10.0	0	0	5.40	3
