= 1905 New York Highlanders season =

Baseball team season

1905 New York Highlanders
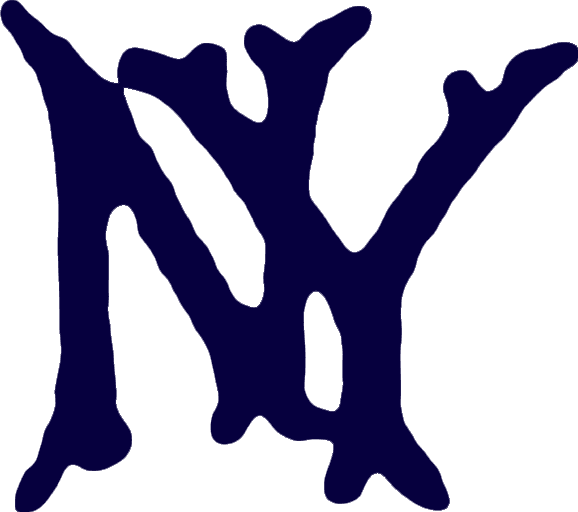
- League: American League
- Ballpark: Hilltop Park
- City: New York, New York
- Record: 71–78 (.477)
- League place: 6th
- Owners: William Devery and Frank Farrell
- Managers: Clark Griffith

The 1905 New York Highlanders season was a season in American baseball. It was the team's third season. The Highlanders finished in sixth place in the American League with a record of 71–78. The team was managed by Clark Griffith and played its home games at Hilltop Park.

== Regular season ==
=== Season standings ===
American League
Team	W	L	Pct.	GB	Home	Road
Philadelphia Athletics	92	56	.622	—	51‍–‍22	41‍–‍34
Chicago White Sox	92	60	.605	2	50‍–‍29	42‍–‍31
Detroit Tigers	79	74	.516	15½	45‍–‍30	34‍–‍44
Boston Americans	78	74	.513	16	44‍–‍32	34‍–‍42
Cleveland Naps	76	78	.494	19	41‍–‍36	35‍–‍42
New York Highlanders	71	78	.477	21½	40‍–‍35	31‍–‍43
Washington Senators	64	87	.424	29½	33‍–‍42	31‍–‍45
St. Louis Browns	54	99	.353	40½	34‍–‍42	20‍–‍57

=== Record vs. opponents ===
1905 American League record Sources:
Team	BOS	CWS	CLE	DET	NYH	PHA	SLB	WSH
Boston	—	6–16–1	14–8	10–12	13–8	7–15	15–7	13–8
Chicago	16–6–1	—	13–9	11–11–1	15–7–1	9–12–1	14–7–1	14–8–1
Cleveland	8–14	9–13	—	12–10	12–10	7–15	14–8–1	14–8
Detroit	12–10	11–11–1	10–12	—	13–8	9–13	13–9	11–11
New York	8–13	7–15–1	10–12	8–13	—	8–11–1	15–7	15–7–1
Philadelphia	15–7	12–9–1	15–7	13–9	11–8–1	—	15–7–1	11–9–1
St. Louis	7–15	7–14–1	8–14–1	9–13	7–15	7–15–1	—	9–13
Washington	8–13	8–14–1	8–14	11–11	7–15–1	9–11–1	13–9	—

=== Roster ===
1905 New York Highlanders
Roster
Pitchers: Jack Chesbro; Walter Clarkson; Wilbur Good; Art Goodwin; Clark Griffith; Bill Hogg; Louis Leroy; Doc Newton; Al Orth; Jack Powell; Ambrose Puttmann	Catchers: Joe Connor; Fred Jacklitsch; Red Kleinow; Joe McCarthy; Deacon McGuire; Infielders: Hal Chase; Jim Cockman; Wid Conroy; Phil Cooney; Fred Curtis; Frank Delahanty; Jack Doyle; Kid Elberfeld; Frank LaPorte; Rube Oldring; Doc Powers; Jimmy Williams; Joe Yeager	Outfielders: John Anderson; Patsy Dougherty; Dave Fultz; Ed Hahn; Willie Keeler; Other positions: Charlie Fallon	Manager: Clark Griffith

== Player stats ==
=== Batting ===
==== Starters by position ====
Note: Pos = Position; G = Games played; AB = At bats; H = Hits; Avg. = Batting average; HR = Home runs; RBI = Runs batted in

Pos	Player	G	AB	H	Avg.	HR	RBI
C	Red Kleinow	88	253	56	.221	1	24
1B	Hal Chase	128	465	116	.249	3	49
2B	Jimmy Williams	129	470	107	.228	6	62
SS	Kid Elberfeld	111	390	102	.262	0	53
3B	Joe Yeager	115	401	107	.267	0	42
OF	Willie Keeler	149	560	169	.302	4	38
OF	Patsy Dougherty	116	418	110	.263	3	29
OF	Dave Fultz	129	422	98	.232	0	42

==== Other batters ====
Note: G = Games played; AB = At bats; H = Hits; Avg. = Batting average; HR = Home runs; RBI = Runs batted in

Player	G	AB	H	Avg.	HR	RBI
Wid Conroy	101	385	105	.273	2	25
Deacon McGuire	72	228	50	.219	0	33
Ed Hahn	43	160	51	.319	0	11
John Anderson	32	99	23	.232	0	14
Frank LaPorte	11	40	16	.400	1	12
Jim Cockman	13	38	4	.105	0	2
Doc Powers	11	33	6	.182	0	2
Rube Oldring	8	30	9	.300	1	6
Frank Delahanty	9	27	6	.222	0	2
Joe Connor	8	22	5	.227	0	2
Fred Curtis	2	9	2	.222	0	2
Fred Jacklitsch	1	3	0	.000	0	1
Jack Doyle	1	3	0	.000	0	0
Phil Cooney	1	3	0	.000	0	0
Joe McCarthy	1	2	0	.000	0	0
Charlie Fallon	1	0	0	----	0	0

=== Pitching ===
==== Starting pitchers ====
Note: G = Games pitched; IP = Innings pitched; W = Wins; L = Losses; ERA = Earned run average; SO = Strikeouts

Player	G	IP	W	L	ERA	SO
Al Orth	40	305.1	18	16	2.86	121
Jack Chesbro	41	303.1	19	15	2.20	156
Louis Leroy	3	24.0	1	1	3.75	8

==== Other pitchers ====
Note: G = Games pitched; IP = Innings pitched; W = Wins; L = Losses; ERA = Earned run average; SO = Strikeouts

Player	G	IP	W	L	ERA	SO
Bill Hogg	39	205.0	9	13	3.20	125
Jack Powell	37	203.0	8	13	3.50	84
Clark Griffith	25	101.2	9	6	1.68	46
Ambrose Puttmann	17	86.1	2	7	4.27	39
Doc Newton	11	59.2	2	2	2.11	15
Walter Clarkson	9	46.0	3	3	3.91	35
Wilbur Good	5	19.0	0	2	4.74	13

==== Relief pitchers ====
Note: G = Games pitched; W = Wins; L = Losses; SV = Saves; ERA = Earned run average; SO = Strikeouts

Player	G	W	L	SV	ERA	SO
Art Goodwin	1	0	0	0	81.00	0
