= 1905 Boston Americans season =

Major League Baseball season

1905 Boston Americans
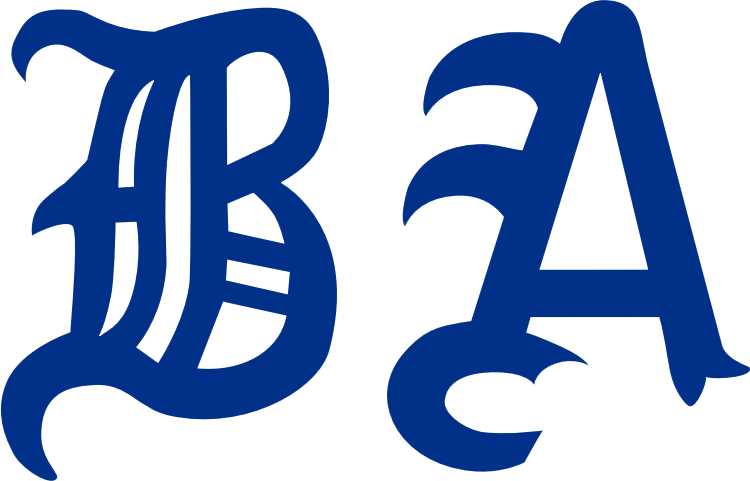
- League: American League
- Ballpark: Huntington Avenue Grounds
- City: Boston, Massachusetts
- Record: 78–74 (.513)
- League place: 4th
- Owners: John I. Taylor
- Managers: Jimmy Collins
- Stats: ESPN.com; Baseball Reference

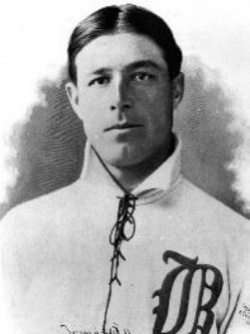
Boston Americans manager Jimmy Collins

The 1905 Boston Americans season was the fifth season for the professional baseball franchise that later became known as the Boston Red Sox. The Americans finished fourth in the American League (AL) with a record of 78 wins and 74 losses, 16 games behind the Philadelphia Athletics. The team was managed by Jimmy Collins and played its home games at Huntington Avenue Grounds.

== Offseason ==
- December 26, 1904: George Stone and cash were traded by the Americans to the St. Louis Browns for Jesse Burkett.
- March 1905: The team held spring training in Macon, Georgia.

== Regular season ==
- April 14: The regular season opens with a 3–2 loss to the Philadelphia Athletics at Columbia Park in Philadelphia.
- April 21: In the home opener, the Americans lose to the visiting Athletics, 5–4.
- July 4: In their longest game of the season, the Americans lose to the Athletics, 4–2 in 20 innings, in the second game of a doubleheader played in Boston.
- August 5: The team has a winning record for the first time in the season, reaching 44–43 with an 8–4 win over the Cleveland Naps at League Park in Cleveland.
- September 27: Bill Dinneen throws a no-hitter in a home game against the Chicago White Sox.
- October 7: The regular season ends with a home doubleheader against the New York Highlanders; Boston wins both games, 7–6 in 10 innings, then 12–9 in five innings.

=== Statistical leaders ===
The offense was led by Jimmy Collins with 65 RBIs and a .276 batting average, and Hobe Ferris with six home runs. The pitching staff was led by Cy Young, who made 38 appearances (33 starts) and pitched 31 complete games with an 18–19 record and 1.82 ERA, while striking out 210 in 320 2/3 innings; and Jesse Tannehill, with 37 appearances (32 starts) and 27 complete games with a 22–9 record and 2.48 ERA, with 113 strikeouts in 271 2/3 innings.

=== Season standings ===
American League
Team	W	L	Pct.	GB	Home	Road
Philadelphia Athletics	92	56	.622	—	51‍–‍22	41‍–‍34
Chicago White Sox	92	60	.605	2	50‍–‍29	42‍–‍31
Detroit Tigers	79	74	.516	15½	45‍–‍30	34‍–‍44
Boston Americans	78	74	.513	16	44‍–‍32	34‍–‍42
Cleveland Naps	76	78	.494	19	41‍–‍36	35‍–‍42
New York Highlanders	71	78	.477	21½	40‍–‍35	31‍–‍43
Washington Senators	64	87	.424	29½	33‍–‍42	31‍–‍45
St. Louis Browns	54	99	.353	40½	34‍–‍42	20‍–‍57

The team had one game end in a tie; June 22 vs. Chicago White Sox. Tie games are not counted in league standings, but player statistics during tie games are counted.

=== Record vs. opponents ===
1905 American League record Sources:
Team	BOS	CWS	CLE	DET	NYH	PHA	SLB	WSH
Boston	—	6–16–1	14–8	10–12	13–8	7–15	15–7	13–8
Chicago	16–6–1	—	13–9	11–11–1	15–7–1	9–12–1	14–7–1	14–8–1
Cleveland	8–14	9–13	—	12–10	12–10	7–15	14–8–1	14–8
Detroit	12–10	11–11–1	10–12	—	13–8	9–13	13–9	11–11
New York	8–13	7–15–1	10–12	8–13	—	8–11–1	15–7	15–7–1
Philadelphia	15–7	12–9–1	15–7	13–9	11–8–1	—	15–7–1	11–9–1
St. Louis	7–15	7–14–1	8–14–1	9–13	7–15	7–15–1	—	9–13
Washington	8–13	8–14–1	8–14	11–11	7–15–1	9–11–1	13–9	—

=== Opening Day lineup ===
Jesse Burkett	LF
Freddy Parent	SS
Chick Stahl	CF
Jimmy Collins	3B
Buck Freeman	RF
Candy LaChance	1B
Hobe Ferris	2B
Duke Farrell	C
Cy Young	P

=== Roster ===
1905 Boston Americans
Roster
Pitchers: Ed Barry; Bill Dinneen; Norwood Gibson; Joe Harris; Ed Hughes; Hank Olmsted; Jesse Tannehill; George Winter; Cy Young	Catchers: Charlie Armbruster; Lou Criger; Tom Doran; Duke Farrell; Art McGovern; Yip Owens; Infielders: Jimmy Collins; Hobe Ferris; Buck Freeman; Myron Grimshaw; Candy LaChance; Freddy Parent; Bob Unglaub	Outfielders: Jesse Burkett; John Godwin; Pop Rising; Kip Selbach; Chick Stahl	Manager: Jimmy Collins

== Player stats ==
=== Batting ===
==== Starters by position ====
Note: Pos=Position; GP=Games played; AB=At bats; R=Runs; H=Hits; 2B=Doubles; 3B=Triples; HR=Home runs; RBI=Runs batted in; BB=Walks; AVG=Batting average; OBP=On base percentage; SLG=Slugging percentage

Pos	Player	GP	AB	R	H	2B	3B	HR	RBI	BB	AVG	OBP	SLG	Reference
C	Lou Criger	109	313	33	62	6	7	1	36	54	.198	.322	.272	
1B	Moose Grimshaw	85	285	39	68	8	2	4	35	21	.239	.293	.323	
2B	Hobe Ferris	142	523	51	115	24	16	6	59	23	.220	.253	.361	
SS	Freddy Parent	153	602	55	141	16	5	0	33	47	.234	.296	.277	
3B	Jimmy Collins	131	508	66	140	26	5	4	65	37	.276	.330	.370	
OF	Jesse Burkett	148	573	78	147	12	13	4	47	67	.257	.339	.344	
OF	Kip Selbach	121	418	54	103	16	6	4	47	67	.246	.355	.342	
OF	Chick Stahl	134	500	61	129	17	4	0	47	50	.258	.332	.308	

==== Other batters ====
Note: GP=Games played; AB=At bats; R=Runs; H=Hits; 2B=Doubles; 3B=Triples; HR=Home runs; RBI=Runs batted in; BB=Walks; AVG=Batting average; OBP=On base percentage; SLG=Slugging percentage

Player	GP	AB	R	H	2B	3B	HR	RBI	BB	AVG	OBP	SLG	Reference
Buck Freeman	130	455	59	109	20	8	3	49	46	.240	.316	.338	
Bob Unglaub	43	121	18	27	5	1	0	11	6	.223	.260	.281	
Charlie Armbruster	35	91	13	18	4	0	0	6	18	.198	.336	.242	
Art McGovern	15	44	1	5	1	0	0	1	4	.114	.204	.136	
John Godwin	15	43	4	14	1	0	0	10	3	.326	.408	.349	
Candy LaChance	12	41	1	6	1	0	0	5	6	.146	.255	.171	
Pop Rising	11	29	2	3	1	1	0	2	2	.103	.161	.207	
Duke Farrell	7	21	2	6	1	0	0	2	1	.286	.318	.333	
Tom Doran	3	3	0	0	0	0	0	0	0	.000	.000	.000	
Yip Owens	1	2	0	0	0	0	0	0	0	.000	.000	.000	

==== Pitchers ====
Note: GP=Games played; AB=At bats; R=Runs; H=Hits; 2B=Doubles; 3B=Triples; HR=Home runs; RBI=Runs batted in; BB=Walks; AVG=Batting average; OBP=On base percentage; SLG=Slugging percentage

Player	GP	AB	R	H	2B	3B	HR	RBI	BB	AVG	OBP	SLG	Reference
Cy Young	38	120	8	18	2	1	2	10	4	.150	.177	.233	
Jesse Tannehill	37	93	11	21	2	0	1	12	16	.226	.339	.280	
George Winter	35	92	12	24	0	0	0	5	5	.261	.306	.261	
Bill Dinneen	31	88	6	13	2	0	0	4	2	.148	.167	.170	
Norwood Gibson	23	42	2	4	0	0	0	0	4	.095	.174	.095	
Hank Olmsted	3	8	0	1	0	0	0	0	1	.125	.222	.125	
Joe Harris	3	9	0	1	0	0	0	0	0	.111	.111	.111	
Ed Barry	7	11	0	1	0	0	0	0	2	.091	.231	.091	
Ed Hughes	6	14	2	3	0	0	0	2	0	.214	.214	.214	

=== Pitching ===
==== Starting pitchers ====
Note: GP=Games Played; GS=Games Started; IP=Innings Pitched; H=Hits; BB=Walks; R=Runs; ER=Earned Runs; SO=Strikeouts; W=Wins; L=Losses; SV=Saves; ERA=Earned Run Average

Player	GP	GS	IP	H	BB	R	ER	SO	W	L	SV	ERA	Reference
Cy Young	38	33	320 2/3	248	30	99	65	210	18	19	0	1.82	
Jesse Tannehill	37	32	271 2/3	238	59	91	75	113	22	9	0	2.48	
George Winter	35	27	264 1/3	249	54	118	87	119	16	17	0	2.96	
Bill Dinneen	31	29	243 2/3	235	50	117	101	97	12	14	1	3.73	
Norwood Gibson	23	17	134	118	55	77	55	67	4	7	0	3.69	
Hank Olmsted	3	3	25	18	12	10	9	6	1	2	0	3.24	
Joe Harris	3	3	23	16	8	6	6	14	1	2	0	2.35	

==== Other pitchers ====
Note: GP=Games Played; GS=Games Started; IP=Innings Pitched; H=Hits; BB=Walks; R=Runs; ER=Earned Runs; SO=Strikeouts; W=Wins; L=Losses; SV=Saves; ERA=Earned Run Average

Player	GP	GS	IP	H	BB	R	ER	SO	W	L	SV	ERA	Reference
Ed Barry	7	5	40 2/3	38	15	19	13	18	1	2	0	2.88	
Ed Hughes	6	4	33 1/3	38	9	27	17	8	3	2	0	4.59	
