= 1905 Cleveland Naps season =

1905 Cleveland Naps
- League: American League
- Ballpark: League Park
- City: Cleveland, Ohio
- Record: 76–78 (.494)
- League place: 5th
- Owners: Charles Somers
- Managers: Bill Bradley, Nap Lajoie

The 1905 Cleveland Naps season was a season in American baseball. The team finished fifth in the American League with a record of 76–78, 19 games behind the Philadelphia Athletics. The Naps were 52–29 on July 24, and held a three -game lead in the American League, but they were only 24–49 after that point, and finished two games under .500 after having been 23 games over .500

== Regular season ==
=== Season standings ===
American League
Team	W	L	Pct.	GB	Home	Road
Philadelphia Athletics	92	56	.622	—	51‍–‍22	41‍–‍34
Chicago White Sox	92	60	.605	2	50‍–‍29	42‍–‍31
Detroit Tigers	79	74	.516	15½	45‍–‍30	34‍–‍44
Boston Americans	78	74	.513	16	44‍–‍32	34‍–‍42
Cleveland Naps	76	78	.494	19	41‍–‍36	35‍–‍42
New York Highlanders	71	78	.477	21½	40‍–‍35	31‍–‍43
Washington Senators	64	87	.424	29½	33‍–‍42	31‍–‍45
St. Louis Browns	54	99	.353	40½	34‍–‍42	20‍–‍57

=== Roster ===
1905 Cleveland Naps
Roster
Pitchers: Bill Bernhard; Red Donahue; Cy Ferry; John Halla; Addie Joss; Earl Moore; Bob Rhoads; Hi West	Catchers: Harry Bemis; Fritz Buelow; Nig Clarke; Howard Wakefield; Infielders: Jap Barbeau; Bill Bradley; Charlie Carr; Eddie Grant; Nick Kahl; Nap Lajoie; Emil Leber; George Stovall; Terry Turner	Outfielders: Harry Bay; Bunk Congalton; Elmer Flick; Otto Hess; Jim Jackson; Rube Vinson	Manager: Bill Bradley; Nap Lajoie

== Player stats ==
=== Batting ===
==== Starters by position ====
Note: Pos = Position; G = Games played; AB = At bats; H = Hits; Avg. = Batting average; HR = Home runs; RBI = Runs batted in

Pos	Player	G	AB	H	Avg.	HR	RBI
C	Fritz Buelow	75	239	41	.172	1	18
1B	Charlie Carr	89	306	72	.235	1	31
2B	Nap Lajoie	65	249	82	.329	2	41
SS	Terry Turner	155	586	155	.265	4	72
3B	Bill Bradley	146	541	145	.268	0	51
OF	Elmer Flick	132	500	154	.308	4	64
OF	Jim Jackson	109	426	109	.256	2	31
OF	Harry Bay	144	552	166	.301	0	22

==== Other batters ====
Note: G = Games played; AB = At bats; H = Hits; Avg. = Batting average; HR = Home runs; RBI = Runs batted in

Player	G	AB	H	Avg.	HR	RBI
George Stovall	112	423	115	.272	1	47
Harry Bemis	70	226	66	.292	0	28
Otto Hess	54	173	44	.254	2	13
Nick Kahl	40	135	29	.215	0	21
Rube Vinson	39	134	26	.194	0	9
Nig Clarke	42	123	24	.195	0	9
Bunk Congalton	12	47	17	.362	0	5
Jap Barbeau	11	37	10	.270	0	2
Howard Wakefield	10	26	4	.154	0	1
Eddie Grant	2	8	3	.375	0	0
Emil Leber	2	6	0	.000	0	0

=== Pitching ===
==== Starting pitchers ====
Note: G = Games pitched; IP = Innings pitched; W = Wins; L = Losses; ERA = Earned run average; SO = Strikeouts

Player	G	IP	W	L	ERA	SO
Addie Joss	33	286.0	20	12	2.01	132
Earl Moore	31	269.0	15	15	2.64	131
Bob Rhoads	28	235.0	16	9	2.83	61
Otto Hess	26	213.2	10	15	3.16	109
Bill Bernhard	22	174.1	7	13	3.36	56
Red Donahue	20	137.2	6	12	3.40	45
Cy Ferry	1	2.0	0	0	13.50	2

==== Other pitchers ====
Note: G = Games pitched; IP = Innings pitched; W = Wins; L = Losses; ERA = Earned run average; SO = Strikeouts

Player	G	IP	W	L	ERA	SO
Hi West	6	33.0	2	2	4.09	15

==== Relief pitchers ====
Note: G = Games pitched; W = Wins; L = Losses; SV = Saves; ERA = Earned run average; SO = Strikeouts

Player	G	W	L	SV	ERA	SO
John Halla	3	0	0	0	2.84	4
