= 1905 Detroit Tigers season =

Major League Baseball season

1905 Detroit Tigers
- League: American League
- Ballpark: Bennett Park
- City: Detroit, Michigan
- Record: 79–74 (.516)
- League place: 3rd
- Owners: William H. Yawkey
- Managers: Bill Armour

1905 was the fifth year for the Detroit Tigers in the American League. The team finished in third place with a record of 79–74 (.516), 15 1/2 games behind the Philadelphia Athletics.

The 1905 Tigers posted a run differential of -97, the lowest ever by a team with a winning record, breaking the previous record of -81 held by the 1882 Detroit Wolverines; the Tigers lost 48 games by 3 or more runs.

== Regular season ==
The 1905 Tigers were outscored by their opponents 602 to 512, the largest negative run differential ever for a Major League team with a winning record. The team's attendance at Bennett Park was 193,384, eighth out of the eight teams in the AL.

=== Season standings ===
American League
Team	W	L	Pct.	GB	Home	Road
Philadelphia Athletics	92	56	.622	—	51‍–‍22	41‍–‍34
Chicago White Sox	92	60	.605	2	50‍–‍29	42‍–‍31
Detroit Tigers	79	74	.516	15½	45‍–‍30	34‍–‍44
Boston Americans	78	74	.513	16	44‍–‍32	34‍–‍42
Cleveland Naps	76	78	.494	19	41‍–‍36	35‍–‍42
New York Highlanders	71	78	.477	21½	40‍–‍35	31‍–‍43
Washington Senators	64	87	.424	29½	33‍–‍42	31‍–‍45
St. Louis Browns	54	99	.353	40½	34‍–‍42	20‍–‍57

=== Record vs. opponents ===
1905 American League record Sources:
Team	BOS	CWS	CLE	DET	NYH	PHA	SLB	WSH
Boston	—	6–16–1	14–8	10–12	13–8	7–15	15–7	13–8
Chicago	16–6–1	—	13–9	11–11–1	15–7–1	9–12–1	14–7–1	14–8–1
Cleveland	8–14	9–13	—	12–10	12–10	7–15	14–8–1	14–8
Detroit	12–10	11–11–1	10–12	—	13–8	9–13	13–9	11–11
New York	8–13	7–15–1	10–12	8–13	—	8–11–1	15–7	15–7–1
Philadelphia	15–7	12–9–1	15–7	13–9	11–8–1	—	15–7–1	11–9–1
St. Louis	7–15	7–14–1	8–14–1	9–13	7–15	7–15–1	—	9–13
Washington	8–13	8–14–1	8–14	11–11	7–15–1	9–11–1	13–9	—

=== Notable transactions ===
- August 24, 1905: Ty Cobb was purchased by the Tigers from the Augusta Tourists.

=== Roster ===
1905 Detroit Tigers
Roster
Pitchers: Andy Bruckmiller; Eddie Cicotte; George Disch; Bill Donovan; John Eubank; Gene Ford; Herb Jackson; Walt Justis; Ed Killian; Frank Kitson; George Mullin; Frosty Thomas; Jimmy Wiggs	Catchers: Nig Clarke; Tom Doran; Lew Drill; John Sullivan; Jack Warner; Bob Wood; Infielders: Bill Coughlin; Chris Lindsay; Bobby Lowe; Charley O'Leary; Germany Schaefer	Outfielders: Jimmy Barrett; Ty Cobb; Duff Cooley; Sam Crawford; Charlie Hickman; Matty McIntyre	Manager: Bill Armour

== Player stats ==
=== Batting ===
==== Starters by position ====
Note: Pos = Position; G = Games played; AB = At bats; H = Hits; Avg. = Batting average; HR = Home runs; RBI = Runs batted in

Pos	Player	G	AB	H	Avg.	HR	RBI
C	Lew Drill	72	211	55	.261	0	24
1B	Chris Lindsay	88	329	88	.267	0	31
2B	Germany Schaefer	153	554	135	.244	2	47
3B	Bill Coughlin	137	489	123	.252	0	44
SS	Charley O'Leary	148	512	109	.213	0	33
OF	Matty McIntyre	131	495	130	.263	0	30
OF	Sam Crawford	154	575	171	.297	6	75
OF	Duff Cooley	97	377	93	.247	1	32

==== Other batters ====
Note: G = Games played; AB = At bats; H = Hits; Avg. = Batting average; HR = Home runs; RBI = Runs batted in

Player	G	AB	H	Avg.	HR	RBI
Charlie Hickman	59	213	47	.221	2	20
Bobby Lowe	58	181	35	.193	0	9
Ty Cobb	41	150	36	.240	1	15
Jack Warner	36	119	24	.202	0	7
Tom Doran	34	94	15	.160	0	4
Jimmy Barrett	20	67	17	.254	0	3
John Sullivan	13	32	5	.156	0	4
Bob Wood	8	24	2	.083	0	0
John Eubank	7	14	5	.357	0	1
Nig Clarke	3	7	3	.429	1	1

Note: pitchers' batting statistics not included

=== Pitching ===
==== Starting pitchers ====
Note: G = Games pitched; IP = Innings pitched; W = Wins; L = Losses; ERA = Earned run average; SO = Strikeouts

Player	G	IP	W	L	ERA	SO
George Mullin	44	347.2	21	21	2.51	168
Ed Killian	39	313.2	23	14	2.27	110
Bill Donovan	34	280.2	18	15	2.60	135
Frank Kitson	33	225.2	12	14	3.47	78
Jimmy Wiggs	7	60.2	3	3	3.27	37
Herb Jackson	2	11.0	0	2	5.73	3

==== Other pitchers ====
Note: G = Games pitched; IP = Innings pitched; W = Wins; L = Losses; ERA = Earned run average; SO = Strikeouts

Player	G	IP	W	L	ERA	SO
George Disch	8	47.2	0	2	2.64	18
Gene Ford	7	35.0	0	1	5.66	20
Eddie Cicotte	3	18.0	1	1	3.50	6
John Eubank	3	17.1	1	0	2.08	1
Frosty Thomas	2	6.0	0	1	7.50	5

==== Relief pitchers ====
Note: G = Games pitched; W = Wins; L = Losses; SV = Saves; ERA = Earned run average; SO = Strikeouts

Player	G	W	L	SV	ERA	SO
Walt Justis	2	0	0	0	8.10	0
Andy Bruckmiller	1	0	0	0	27.00	1

== Awards and honors ==
=== League top five finishers ===
Ty Cobb

- Youngest player in the AL (18)

Ed Killian

- AL leader in shutouts (8)
- #3 in AL in wins (23)
- #3 in AL in bases on balls allowed (107)
- #4 in AL in complete games (33)
- #4 in AL in hit batsmen (13)
- #5 in AL in games started (37)

Frank Kitson

- #5 in AL in earned runs allowed (87)

Sam Crawford

- #2 in AL in OPS (.786)
- #2 in AL in doubles (38)
- #2 in AL in runs created (87)
- #2 in AL in extra base hits (54)
- #3 in AL in slugging percentage (.430)
- #3 in AL in hits (171)
- #3 in AL in total bases (247)
- #3 in AL in home runs (6)
- #3 in AL in times on base (224)
- #4 in AL in on-base percentage (.357)
- #4 in AL in RBIs (75)
- #4 in AL in Power/Speed Number (9.4)
- #5 in AL in batting average (.297)

Bill Donovan

- #4 in AL in bases on balls allowed (101)

Bobby Lowe

- 2nd oldest player in the AL (39)

George Mullin

- AL leader in complete games (35)
- AL leader in innings pitched (347 2/3)
- AL leader in games started (41)
- AL leader in bases on balls allowed (138)
- AL leader in hits allowed (303)
- AL leader in batters faced (1473)
- #2 in AL in games (44)
- #3 in AL in earned runs allowed (97)
- #4 in AL in losses (21)

Bob Wood

- 3rd oldest player in AL (39)
