= 1905 Chicago White Sox season =

1905 Chicago White Sox
- League: American League
- Ballpark: South Side Park
- City: Chicago, Illinois
- Record: 92–60 (.605)
- League place: 2nd
- Owners: Charles Comiskey
- Managers: Fielder Jones

== Offseason ==
- February 1905: Branch Rickey was traded by the White Sox to the Browns for a player to be named later. The Browns completed the deal by sending Frank Roth to the White Sox in June.

== Regular season ==
- July 1, 1905: Frank Owen became the first pitcher in the history of the American League to have two complete game victories on the same day. On September 26, teammate Ed Walsh would match the feat.

=== Season standings ===
American League
Team	W	L	Pct.	GB	Home	Road
Philadelphia Athletics	92	56	.622	—	51‍–‍22	41‍–‍34
Chicago White Sox	92	60	.605	2	50‍–‍29	42‍–‍31
Detroit Tigers	79	74	.516	15½	45‍–‍30	34‍–‍44
Boston Americans	78	74	.513	16	44‍–‍32	34‍–‍42
Cleveland Naps	76	78	.494	19	41‍–‍36	35‍–‍42
New York Highlanders	71	78	.477	21½	40‍–‍35	31‍–‍43
Washington Senators	64	87	.424	29½	33‍–‍42	31‍–‍45
St. Louis Browns	54	99	.353	40½	34‍–‍42	20‍–‍57

=== Record vs. opponents ===
1905 American League record Sources:
Team	BOS	CWS	CLE	DET	NYH	PHA	SLB	WSH
Boston	—	6–16–1	14–8	10–12	13–8	7–15	15–7	13–8
Chicago	16–6–1	—	13–9	11–11–1	15–7–1	9–12–1	14–7–1	14–8–1
Cleveland	8–14	9–13	—	12–10	12–10	7–15	14–8–1	14–8
Detroit	12–10	11–11–1	10–12	—	13–8	9–13	13–9	11–11
New York	8–13	7–15–1	10–12	8–13	—	8–11–1	15–7	15–7–1
Philadelphia	15–7	12–9–1	15–7	13–9	11–8–1	—	15–7–1	11–9–1
St. Louis	7–15	7–14–1	8–14–1	9–13	7–15	7–15–1	—	9–13
Washington	8–13	8–14–1	8–14	11–11	7–15–1	9–11–1	13–9	—

=== Roster ===
1905 Chicago White Sox
Roster
Pitchers: Nick Altrock; Frank Owen; Roy Patterson; Frank Smith; Ed Walsh; Doc White	Catchers: Hub Hart; Ed McFarland; Billy Sullivan; Infielders: George Davis; Jiggs Donahue; Gus Dundon; Frank Isbell; George Rohe; Lee Tannehill	Outfielders: Nixey Callahan; Danny Green; Ducky Holmes; Fielder Jones	Manager: Fielder Jones

== Player stats ==
=== Batting ===
==== Starters by position ====
Note: Pos = Position; G = Games played; AB = At bats; H = Hits; Avg. = Batting average; HR = Home runs; RBI = Runs batted in

Pos	Player	G	AB	H	Avg.	HR	RBI
C	Billy Sullivan	98	323	65	.201	2	26
1B	Jiggs Donahue	149	533	153	.287	1	76
2B	Gus Dundon	106	364	70	.192	0	22
SS	George Davis	151	550	153	.278	1	55
3B	Lee Tannehill	142	480	96	.200	0	39
OF	Fielder Jones	153	568	139	.245	2	38
OF	Danny Green	112	379	92	.243	0	44
OF	Ducky Holmes	92	328	66	.201	0	22

==== Other batters ====
Note: G = Games played; AB = At bats; H = Hits; Avg. = Batting average; HR = Home runs; RBI = Runs batted in

Player	G	AB	H	Avg.	HR	RBI
Nixey Callahan	96	345	94	.272	1	43
Frank Isbell	94	341	101	.296	2	45
Ed McFarland	80	250	70	.280	0	31
George Rohe	34	113	24	.212	1	12
Hub Hart	11	20	2	.100	0	4

=== Pitching ===
==== Starting pitchers ====
Note: G = Games pitched; IP = Innings pitched; W = Wins; L = Losses; ERA = Earned run average; SO = Strikeouts

Player	G	IP	W	L	ERA	SO
Frank Owen	42	334.0	21	13	2.10	125
Nick Altrock	38	315.2	23	12	1.88	97
Frank Smith	39	291.2	19	13	2.13	171
Doc White	36	260.1	17	13	1.76	120

==== Other pitchers ====
Note: G = Games pitched; IP = Innings pitched; W = Wins; L = Losses; ERA = Earned run average; SO = Strikeouts

Player	G	IP	W	L	ERA	SO
Ed Walsh	22	136.2	8	3	2.17	71
Roy Patterson	13	88.2	4	6	1.83	29
