= Emil Leber =

American baseball player (1881-1924)

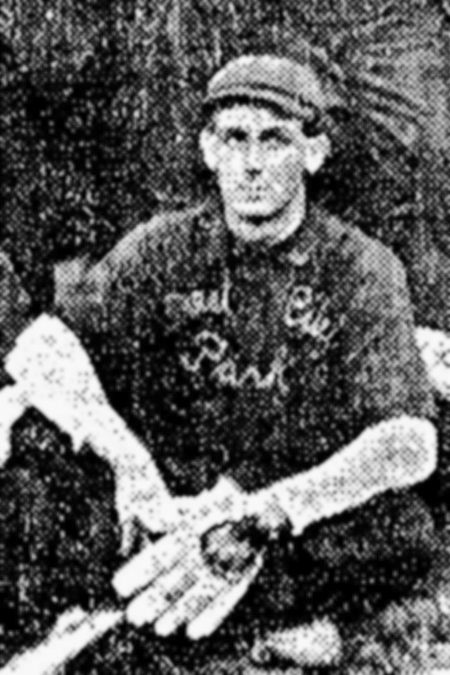
- Third Baseman
- Born: May 15, 1881; Cleveland, Ohio
- Died: November 6, 1924 (aged 43); Cleveland, Ohio
- Batted: Right Threw: Right

MLB debut
- September 2, 1905, for the Cleveland Naps

Last MLB appearance
- September 3, 1905, for the Cleveland Naps

MLB statistics
- Batting average: .000
- Games played: 2
- Runs scored: 1
- Stats at Baseball Reference

Teams
- Cleveland Naps (1905)

Emil Bohmiel Leber (May 15, 1881 – November 6, 1924) was a Major League Baseball third baseman who played for one season. He played in two games for the Cleveland Naps during the 1905 Cleveland Naps season.
