= Nig Clarke =

Canadian baseball player (1882–1949)

Jay Clarke
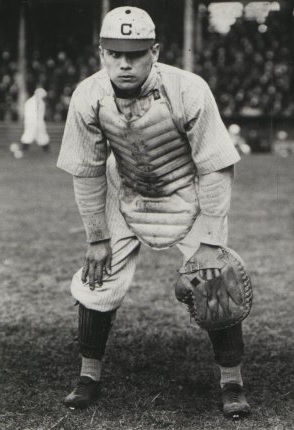
- Clarke playing for the Cleveland Naps
- Catcher
- Born: December 15, 1882; Anderdon Township (now Amherstburg, Ontario), Canada
- Died: June 15, 1949 (aged 66); River Rouge, Michigan, U.S.
- Batted: Left Threw: Right

MLB debut
- April 26, 1905, for the Cleveland Naps

Last MLB appearance
- April 24, 1920, for the Pittsburgh Pirates

MLB statistics
- Batting average: .254
- Home runs: 6
- Runs batted in: 127
- Stats at Baseball Reference

Teams
- Detroit Tigers (1905); Cleveland Naps (1905–1910); St. Louis Browns (1911); Philadelphia Phillies (1919); Pittsburgh Pirates (1920)

Member of the Canadian

Baseball Hall of Fame
- Induction: 1996

Jay Justin "Nig" Clarke (December 15, 1882 – June 15, 1949) was a Canadian professional baseball player. A catcher, Clarke played in Major League Baseball (MLB) for nine seasons with the Detroit Tigers, Cleveland Naps, St. Louis Browns, Philadelphia Phillies, and Pittsburgh Pirates. In 506 career games, Clarke recorded a batting average of .254 and accumulated 20 triples, six home runs, and 127 runs batted in (RBI).

Born in Canada and raised in Michigan, Clarke began his baseball career in 1902, when he reportedly hit eight home runs in one game while playing for the Corsicana Oil Citys of the Texas League. From there, he spent two more seasons in the minor leagues before the Cleveland Naps signed him to a contract. Aside from a loan to the Detroit Tigers, he played for the Naps for six seasons. Clarke was then traded to the St. Louis Browns, where he played for one season. After several years in the minor leagues, Clarke joined the United States Marine Corps. He returned to the major leagues and played there until 1920, then continued playing for minor league teams until 1927. Clarke then retired from the game, rejoined the Marines, and moved to River Rouge, Michigan, where he lived until his death in 1949.

== Early life ==
Clarke was born in 1882 at Anderdon Township (now Amherstburg, Ontario), Canada. He was a member of the Wyandot of Anderdon First Nation. He moved to Detroit, Michigan as a child in April 1888. He began playing semi-pro baseball in Adrian, Michigan, while studying at Assumption College in Windsor, Ontario, Canada. Early in his career, he was given the nickname of "Nig" by newspapers due to his dark complexion.

== Professional baseball ==
=== Early career ===
Clarke began his professional career in 1902 with the Corsicana Oil Citys in the Texas League. On June 15, he hit eight home runs in ten at bats in a 51–3 victory over the Texarkana Casketmakers. Because Corsicana's blue laws forbade Sunday baseball (or, according to The Sporting News, due to poor attendance in Corsicana), the game was played in Ennis, Texas, in a facility that has a right field fence estimated to be 210 feet from home plate along the foul line. While some cast doubt on Clarke's eight home run game, the feat was later attested to by the official scorer (under oath) and by others who observed the game. In a 1940 interview with The Sporting News, one of Clarke's Corsicana teammates claimed:

"The right field fence at Ennis wasn't more than 40 feet [12 m] back of first base. Nig just pulled eight short flies around and over that wall. I'm not taking anything away from old Nig's batting prowess—he was the one of the best hitters I ever saw. But that's the way he hit eight homers that day. Didn't have to send the ball more than 140 feet [43 m] at the most."

In 1903, Clarke played for the Little Rock Travelers in the Southern Association, and had a batting average of .254 in 41 games. While with Little Rock, he clashed with owner Mike Finn, who refused to trade him throughout the season despite Clarke's demands and trade offers by other teams. After the 1903 season ended, he was traded to the Atlanta Crackers of the same league. With Atlanta, Clarke started off the first half of the season with a .400 batting average before cooling down in the second half. He finished the season with a .264 average in 135 games.

=== Cleveland Naps ===
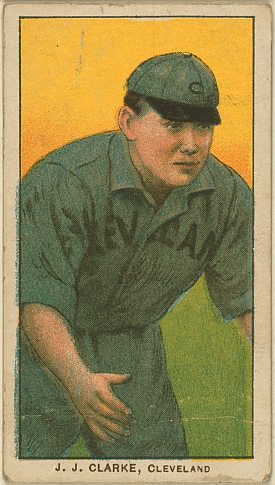
Baseball card of Clarke

At the end of the 1904 season, the Cleveland Naps purchased Clarke from Atlanta. The plan was for Clarke to be the third catcher on the roster behind Harry Bemis and Fritz Buelow, and as a result, he only played in a few games during the first half of the season. In August 1905, Clarke briefly joined the Detroit Tigers after the Cleveland team traveled to Boston without him. He was loaned to Detroit with the understanding that the Naps could reclaim him on one day's notice. Clarke appeared in only three games for Detroit, compiling a .429 batting average and a home run before being recalled by the Naps. In 45 games between both teams on the season, he had a .208 batting average.

Clarke began the 1906 season as the third string catcher. A month into the season, Naps manager Nap Lajoie changed the roster around partially due to Clarke's hitting, which had improved greatly from last season. To end the year, Clarke compiled a career high batting average of .358, tying him with George Stone for the American League batting championship. However, Stone was recognized as the batting champion because Clarke had only appeared in only 57 games with 195 plate appearances. Clarke began to wear shin guards early in his career, and was one of the first ballplayers to adopt this layer of protection.

After spending the offseason playing winter baseball in Florida with several other major leaguers, Clarke became the everyday catcher for the 1907 season. He started off hitting well, and had a batting average of .381 through the first month of the league, which was second in the American League. He started nearly every game for the Naps until his finger was hit by a foul ball in a game in June, causing him to miss two weeks. By the end of the season, he had stopped playing well, finishing the season with a .269 batting average and six triples in 120 games, as well as a league-leading 25 passed balls. During the offseason, Clarke played winter baseball in Cuba, then returned to Cleveland in March.

Clarke spent the 1908 season splitting time at the catcher position with Bemis, as both struggled in spring practice. In September, Clarke sustained an injury in a game against Detroit when the bone of a finger on his right hand was split and he was unable to grow a nail. On October 2, he caught a perfect game thrown by Addie Joss, which was only the fourth perfect game in MLB history. He finished the year with a .241 batting average and six triples in 97 games. On Thanksgiving night in 1908, Clarke was married to Mary A. Smith at the home of the bride's parents in Sandwich, Ontario, Canada. His wife did not like the "Nig" nickname that sports reporters used, and wanted them to simply call him Jay in newspapers.

The signing of Ted Easterly and Grover Land gave the Naps four catchers entering spring training. Easterly became the starting catcher and Bemis the backup due to Clarke's "lack of ambition", which led to speculation that he could be traded during the season. He finished the season with a .274 batting average in 55 games. During the offseason, St. Louis Browns player-manager Jack O'Connor attempted to trade for Clarke, but a deal never materialized. Clarke saw little playing time in 1910 due to a bout of typhoid fever, which landed him in the hospital for most of the season. He played 21 games that season, batting .155.

=== St. Louis Browns and minor leagues ===
On December 14, 1910, Cleveland traded Clarke to the St. Louis Browns in exchange for Art Griggs. Clarke split time with Jim Stephens at catcher for the Browns, and appeared in 82 games for the team in 1911, compiling a .215 batting average. After the 1911 season, was released on waivers to the Washington Senators. The Senators, however, had no interest in him and tried to undo the acceptance, which was overruled by American League president Ban Johnson. Shortly afterwards, he was sold to the Indianapolis Indians in the American Association, where he played from 1912 to 1913. In 1912, he hit .266 in 92 games, and the following year he hit .282 in 28 games.

Partway through the 1913 season, Clarke was sold to the San Francisco Seals of the Pacific Coast League, where he played from 1913 to 1915. With San Francisco, he hit .281 and .222 in 1913 and 1914, respectively. He also played parts of the 1915 season with the Houston Buffaloes of the Texas League and the Memphis Chickasaws of the Southern Association, playing in 81 total games for the three teams. In 1916, Clarke was traded by Houston to the Mobile Sea Gulls of the Southern Association for Hub Northen. That season, he batted .149 in 20 games before being released.

=== Later career ===
On August 1, 1917, Clarke enlisted in the United States Marine Corps. While serving, he attained the rank of corporal and served in Brest, France. In 1918, while serving in the Marine Corps, Clarke filed a military naturalization petition and became a United States citizen; a year later he was discharged. While serving in the Marines, Clarke stated that he wished he "joined the marine corps twelve years ago and never played ball."

In 1919, he returned mid-season to the major leagues with the Philadelphia Phillies. He appeared in 26 games, compiling a .242 batting average. He led the National League with a 58.8% caught stealing percentage. Prior to 1919, only three catchers in major league history had ever compiled a higher caught stealing percentage. In November 1919, Clarke was selected off waivers by the Pittsburgh Pirates from the Phillies. He appeared in three games for the Pirates and had no hits in seven at bats. He appeared in his final major league game on April 24, 1920.

After his brief stay in Pittsburgh, the Pirates sent Clarke to Greenville in 1920. He played next for Toledo and Winston-Salem, and then for the Reading Aces in the International League during the 1922 and 1923 seasons. In 1924, he played for both Reading and Harrisburg. In 1925, he played for the Salisbury Indians in the Eastern Shore League. In the spring of 1925, The Sporting News wrote: "Nig Clarke not only led the league with the bat and the mitt and the arm, he was the very picture of a baseball player. I rather suspect that Nig put away as much corn juice as the next man. In the days of his greatness he was wont to take a couple of snifters every morning before breakfast. Never seemed to hurt Nig any." At the end of the season, he was given most valuable player honors for his performance with Salisbury. Clarke concluded his professional baseball career in 1927 with Tulsa.

== Later life ==
At the time of the 1920 U.S. Census, Clarke and his wife were living in Detroit. In June 1929, Clarke rejoined the Marine Corps, serving until August 1932 still in rank of Corporal. At the time of the 1930 U.S. Census, Clarke was stationed at the Quantico Marine Barracks in Quantico, Prince William County, Virginia.

After being discharged from the Marine Corps, Clarke built a house in River Rouge, a suburb of Detroit, where he lived with his wife and mother. In June 1949, Clarke was found dead at his home in River Rouge.

He was named to the Canadian Baseball Hall of Fame, in St. Marys, Ontario, in the Class of 1996.
