= Harry Cassady =

American baseball player (1880–1969)

- Outfielder
- Born: July 20, 1880; Bellflower, Illinois, U.S.
- Died: April 19, 1969 (aged 88); Fresno, California, U.S.
- Batted: Left Threw: Left

MLB debut
- August 8, 1904, for the Pittsburgh Pirates

Last MLB appearance
- May 28, 1905, for the Washington Senators

MLB statistics
- Batting average: .176
- Home runs: 4
- Runs batted in: 2
- Stats at Baseball Reference

Teams
- Pittsburgh Pirates (1904); Washington Senators (1905)

Harry Delbert Cassady (born Cassaday) (July 20, 1880 – April 19, 1969) was an American professional baseball player who played outfield in the Major Leagues for the 1904 Pittsburgh Pirates and 1905 Washington Senators. He went to Illinois Wesleyan University.
