= Art McGovern =

Canadian baseball player (1882-1915)

- Catcher
- Born: February 27, 1882; Saint John, New Brunswick, Canada
- Died: November 14, 1915 (aged 33); Danvers, Massachusetts, U.S.
- Batted: Right Threw: Right

MLB debut
- April 21, 1905, for the Boston Red Sox

Last MLB appearance
- October 3, 1905, for the Boston Red Sox

MLB statistics
- Batting average: .114
- Home runs: 0
- Runs scored: 1
- Stats at Baseball Reference

Teams
- Boston Red Sox (1905)

Arthur John McGovern (February 27, 1882 – November 14, 1915) was a Canadian born reserve catcher in Major League Baseball who played for the Boston Americans during the 1905 season. Listed at 5' 10", 160 lb., McGovern batted and threw right-handed. He was born in Saint John, New Brunswick, Canada.

In a 15-game career, McGovern was a .114 hitter (5-for-44) with one run, one double and one RBI. He did not hit any home runs. In 15 catching appearances, he committed four errors in 82 chances for a .951 fielding percentage.

McGovern died in Danvers, Massachusetts at age 33.

== See also ==
- 1905 Boston Americans season
- List of Major League Baseball players from Canada
