= Bill McGill (baseball) =

American baseball player (1880-1959)

- Pitcher
- Born: July 29, 1880; Galva, Kansas
- Died: August 7, 1959 (aged 79); Alva, Oklahoma
- Batted: Right Threw: Right

MLB debut
- September 16, 1907, for the St. Louis Browns

Last MLB appearance
- September 27, 1907, for the St. Louis Browns

MLB statistics
- Win–loss record: 1–0
- Earned run average: 3.44
- Strikeouts: 8
- Stats at Baseball Reference

Teams
- St. Louis Browns (1907)

William Jacob McGill (1880–1959) was an American right-handed pitcher in Major League Baseball. He played for the 1907 St. Louis Browns. His college ball was played at Friends University.
