= Jimmy McAleer =

American baseball player (1864–1931)

James McAleer
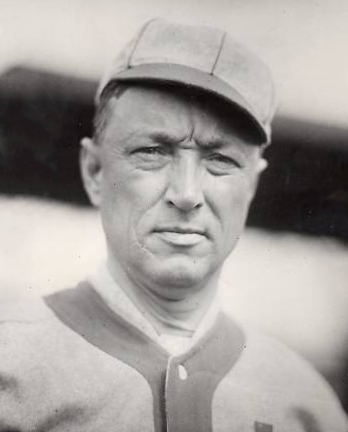
- Center fielder / Manager / Executive
- Born: July 10, 1864; Youngstown, Ohio, U.S.
- Died: April 29, 1931 (aged 66); Youngstown, Ohio, U.S.
- Batted: Right Threw: Right

MLB debut
- April 24, 1889, for the Cleveland Spiders

Last MLB appearance
- July 8, 1907, for the St. Louis Browns

MLB statistics
- Batting average: .253
- Home runs: 12
- Runs batted in: 469
- Stats at Baseball Reference
- Managerial record at Baseball Reference

Teams
- As player: Cleveland Spiders (1889–1898); Cleveland Blues (1901); St. Louis Browns (1902, 1907); As manager: Cleveland Blues (1901); St Louis Browns (1902–1909); Washington Senators (1910–1911); As owner: Boston Red Sox (1911–1913)

James Robert "Loafer" McAleer (July 10, 1864 – April 29, 1931) was an American center fielder, manager, and stockholder in Major League Baseball who assisted in establishing the American League. He spent most of his 13-season playing career with the Cleveland Spiders, and went on to manage the Cleveland Blues, St. Louis Browns, and Washington Senators. Shortly before his retirement, he became a major shareholder in the Boston Red Sox. His career ended abruptly. During his brief tenure as co-owner of the Red Sox, McAleer quarreled with longtime friend and colleague Ban Johnson, president of the American League. In the wake of this disagreement, he sold off his shares in the Red Sox and broke off his relationship with Major League Baseball.

McAleer's rift with Johnson, along with his sudden retirement, damaged his professional reputation, and he received little recognition for his contributions to baseball. Today, he is most often remembered for initiating the customary request that the President of the United States throw out the first ball of the season.

== Early years ==
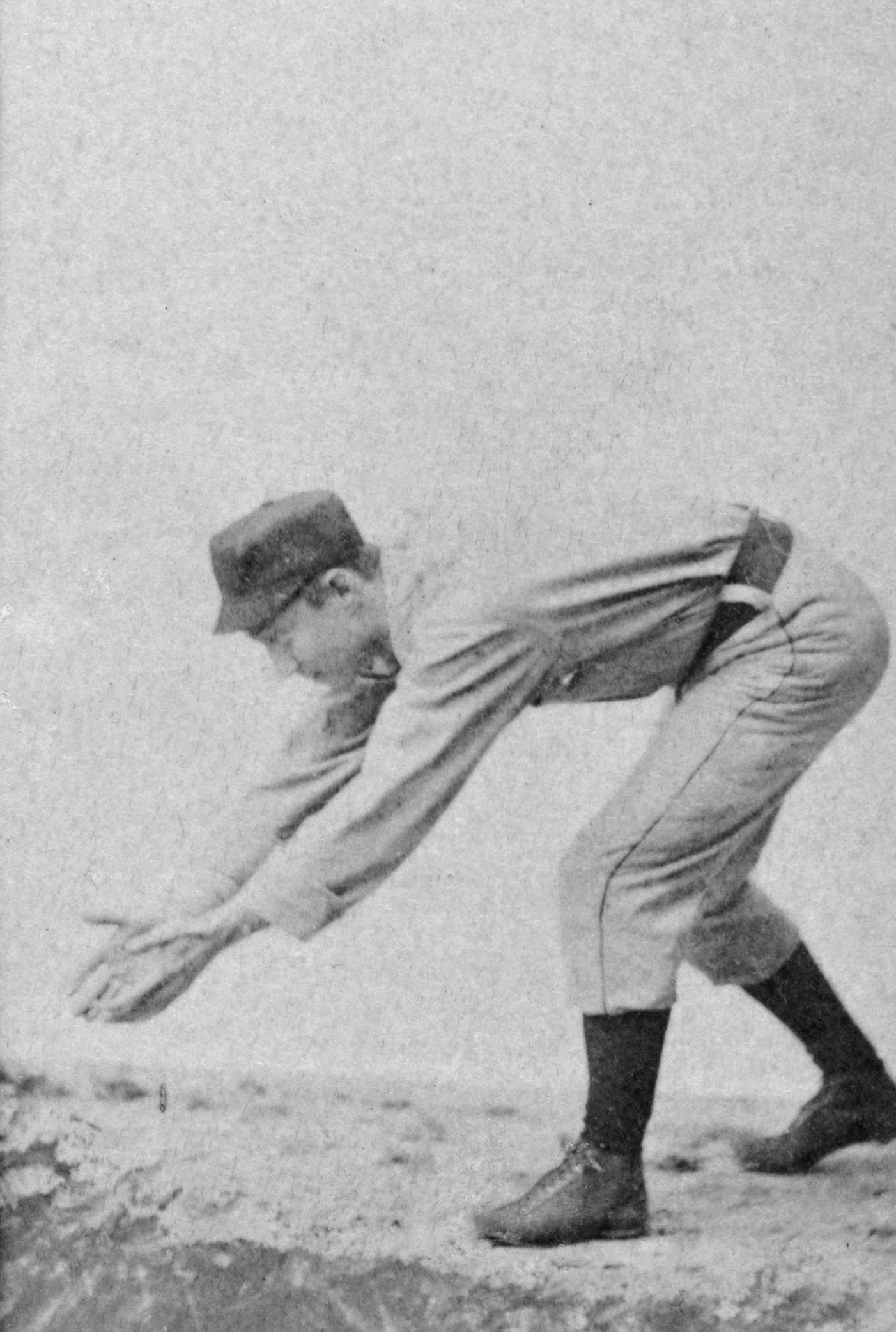
McAleer on a baseball card c. 1887

McAleer was born in Youngstown, Ohio. His father, Owen McAleer, died at a young age, leaving McAleer's mother, Mary, to support three children. The family lived on the city's west side, where the McAleer children were raised to value the concept of formal education. McAleer attended local public schools and graduated from Rayen High School. In later years, all three of the McAleer brothers moved on to successful careers, and the oldest, Owen McAleer Jr., served for a time as mayor of Los Angeles.

A "strapping six-foot 175-pound outfielder," McAleer won early recognition for his physical speed. He became involved with a Youngstown minor league baseball club in 1882, remaining with the team until 1884. In 1885, McAleer joined another minor league organization in Charleston, South Carolina; and in 1887, he played for a team based in Memphis, Tennessee. His skill as a center fielder was recognized in 1888, while he was playing for a club in Milwaukee, Wisconsin.

McAleer was drawn to the field of entertainment. During one season of his minor league career, he became part-owner of the DeHaven Comedy Company, a theatrical road troupe that was organized in Youngstown. His interest in show business remained a constant, and in later years McAleer developed a strong friendship with Broadway composer and performer George M. Cohan.

== Playing career ==
On April 24, 1889, McAleer broke into the Major Leagues in Cleveland, Ohio, where he established a reputation as a graceful outfielder. In 1891, when Patsy Tebeau became manager of the Cleveland Spiders, the club became known for its aggressive tactics. Tebeau encouraged players to block and hold runners, while he himself openly challenged and harassed officials. In 1896, the Cleveland manager was jailed for attacking an umpire who "decided it was too dark to continue a game". On June 27, 1896, McAleer was among several Cleveland players to be fined by a Louisville (Kentucky) judge for their role in the incident. Later that year, the club's notoriety prompted other National League teams to propose a boycott of Cleveland, "until the Spiders mended their ways." McAleer's periodic displays of temper were in keeping with this rowdy environment. During an August 18, 1891 game with the Cincinnati Reds, Reds player Arlie Latham tripped McAleer as he rounded third base; McAleer responded by chasing Latham around the field, while brandishing his bat.

At the same time, McAleer proved a strong performer. A later newspaper account described him as an outstanding outfielder who was "blessed with excellent speed". The article noted that McAleer's skills as a sprinter helped him steal 51 bases in one year and 41 in another. According to some accounts, he was "the first centerfielder to take his eyes off a fly ball, run to the spot where it fell to earth, and catch it". Less proficient as a hitter, McAleer accumulated a lifetime batting average of .253. During his career, the league's batting (pitchers removed) average for players with the same home field was .284.

On April 24, 1894, he assisted in Cleveland's 1–0 victory over Cincinnati with a single in the ninth that drove home Buck Ewing, who had doubled. Along with teammates Cy Young, Jesse Burkett, John Clarkson, and Charles Zimmer, McAleer also participated in the Spiders' victory over the Baltimore Orioles in the 1895 Temple Cup, a post-season series between first and second-place teams of the National League. The Spiders placed second to the Orioles at the close of both the 1895 and 1896 seasons. McAleer's performance came in spite of a serious injury he received during a game held in Philadelphia on August 24, 1895, when he collided with a fence. Furthermore, he balanced his achievements in sports with a foray into politics in his hometown of Youngstown. During the summer of 1895, McAleer was promoted in the local media as a mayoral candidate, first as a Republican, and then as an independent.

In 1898, when the Spiders' owners purchased the St. Louis Browns franchise, McAleer opted to stay in Cleveland, taking a brief hiatus from baseball until the Cleveland Blues franchise joined the newly formed American League (AL). During his two-year absence, the Spiders lost many of their more experienced players. In 1899, the team won 20 games and lost 134, which is still percentage-wise the worst season record in Major League history. As baseball historian Bill James noted, the Spiders were forced to cancel home games due to poor attendance and "turned the last two months of the season into a long road trip". After a full year out of baseball in 1899, McAleer was back in a Cleveland uniform in 1900, in a new league, as player-manager of the Cleveland Lake Shores of the fledgling American League, then a minor league. McAleer's subsequent career as a major league manager (1901–11) overlapped with his playing career (1882–1907). Although he did not play professionally between 1903 and 1906, McAleer played in his last Major League game on July 8, 1907.

== Managing career ==
=== Cleveland Lake Shores/Blues ===
In 1900, McAleer became player-manager of the Cleveland Lake Shores (a predecessor of the Cleveland Indians) and continued with the franchise in 1901, when the American League became a major league and the club was renamed as the Blues, a name borrowed from a team that had participated in the National League during the 1870s and 1880s. The Blues made their major league debut on April 24, 1901, with an 8–2 loss to the Chicago White Sox. Two other league games were canceled due to inclement weather, and the contest between the Blues and White Sox served as the inaugural game of the AL.

In July of that year, McAleer presided over the Blues' upset 6–1 loss to the Detroit Tigers. Although the Tigers' manager, Tommy Burns, agreed to forfeit the game for fear that the umpire, Joe Cantillon, would be injured by an angry crowd, McAleer agreed to play the Tigers using a reserve umpire. The Blues eventually closed the season with a 54–82 record, placing seventh in the eight-team American League.

McAleer, however, contributed little to this outcome. In 1901, he played in only three games with the Blues. The AL, established in 1900 by Ban Johnson, former president of the Western League, was by this time in direct competition with the well-established National League (NL). McAleer, a close friend of Johnson and his associate, Charles Comiskey, played a significant role in the new league's development, recruiting scores of experienced players from the NL.

=== St. Louis Browns ===
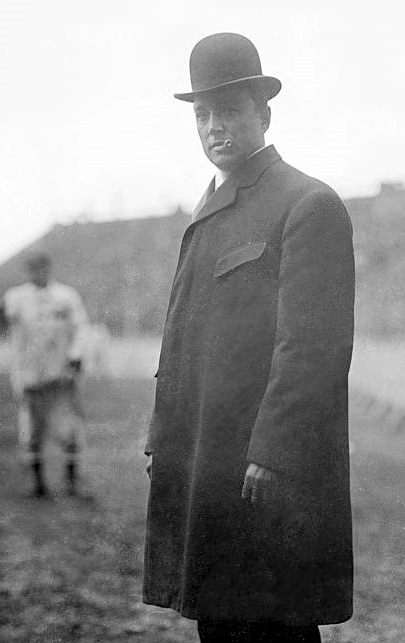
McAleer in 1905

As manager of the Browns, McAleer lured players such as Hall of Famers Jesse Burkett and Bobby Wallace. In 1902, the Browns took second place in the league, with a record of 78 wins and 58 losses. Between 1903 and 1907, however, the team never ranked higher than fifth or sixth place in the AL. Then, in 1908, the club rebounded, finishing just 6 1/2 games out of first place, with a record of 83 wins and 69 losses, landing at fourth in the AL. The Browns ended the 1909 season, however, with a record of 61–89, earning seventh place. McAleer was fired at the close of the season. Browns owner Robert L. Hedges, a Cincinnati carriage maker, replaced the "affable" McAleer with the "crustier" Jack O'Connor, who was expelled from the league in 1910 for seeking to influence the outcome of the annual batting championship.

=== Washington Senators ===
On September 22, 1909, McAleer became the manager of the Washington Senators (popularly known as the "Nationals"), a team that had ceased to be competitive since the death of star hitter Ed Delahanty six years earlier. The team fared little better under McAleer's management, finishing with a lackluster 66–85 record (seventh place) at the close of the 1910 season.

The high point of the season was a game in which McAleer initiated what became a baseball tradition. On April 14, 1910, he asked visiting President William Howard Taft to throw out the first ball of a season opener. President Taft, an ardent fan of the game, readily agreed. Baseball historians Donald Dewey and Nicholas Acocella noted that the game "almost put an end to the career" of U.S. Vice President James S. Sherman, who "took a foul ball off the bat of Frank Baker directly in the head". This contest also featured a one-hit performance by pitcher Walter Johnson, who led the Senators to a 3–0 victory over the Philadelphia Athletics.

== Managerial record ==
Team	Year	Regular season					Postseason			
Team	Year	Games	Won	Lost	Win %	Finish	Won	Lost	Win %	Result
CLE	1901	136	54	82	.397	7th in AL	–	–	–	–
CLE total		136	54	82	.397		0	0	–	
SLB	1902	136	78	58	.574	2nd in AL	–	–	–	–
SLB	1903	139	65	74	.468	6th in AL	–	–	–	–
SLB	1904	152	65	87	.428	6th in AL	–	–	–	–
SLB	1905	153	54	99	.353	8th in AL	–	–	–	–
SLB	1906	149	76	73	.510	5th in AL	–	–	–	–
SLB	1907	152	69	83	.454	6th in AL	–	–	–	–
SLB	1908	152	83	69	.546	4th in AL	–	–	–	–
SLB	1909	150	61	89	.407	7th in AL	–	–	–	–
SLB total		1163	531	632	.457		0	0	–	
WSH	1910	151	66	85	.437	7th in AL	–	–	–	–
WSH	1911	154	64	90	.416	7th in AL	–	–	–	–
WSH total		305	130	175	.426		0	0	–	
Total		1604	715	889	.446		0	0	–	

== Executive career ==
=== Boston Red Sox ===
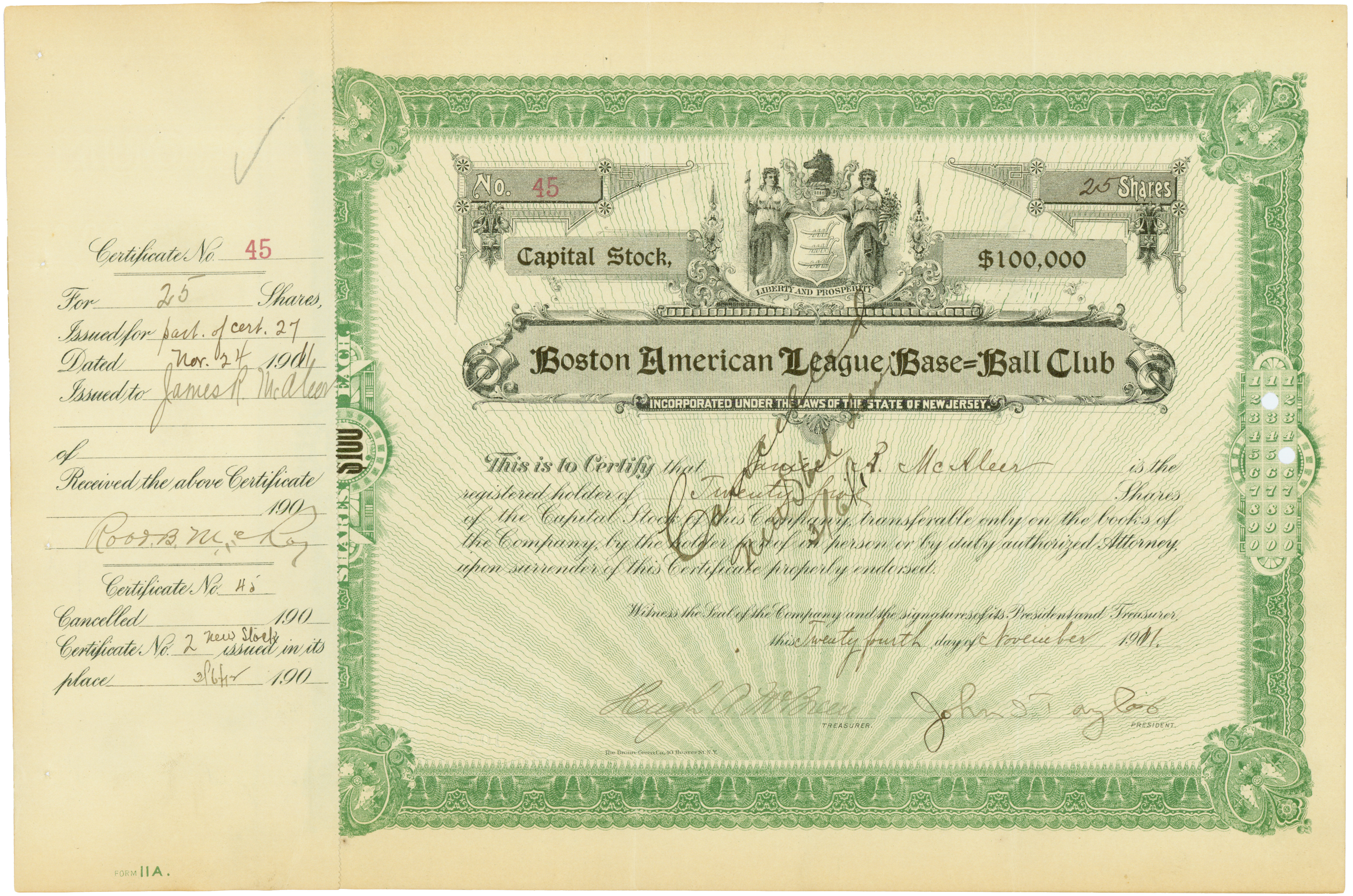
Jimmy McAlleer was the owner of this share of the Boston American League Base-Ball Club, issued 25. November 1911

Toward the close of the 1911 season, McAleer announced his resignation as manager of the Senators. In 1912, he became a major stockholder in the Boston Red Sox, purchasing a half-interest in the team. That year, the Red Sox "cruised to the pennant with 105 victories".

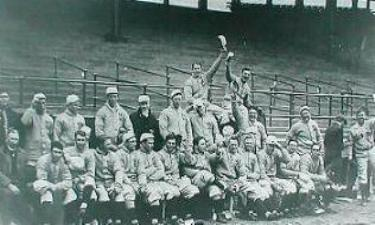
Red Sox as 1912 champions

By the time the Red Sox entered the sixth game of the 1912 World Series, the team had secured a 3–1 lead over the New York Giants. (The second game of the Series ended in a tie.) Then, McAleer pressured the team's manager, Jake Stahl, to hand the ball to unseasoned pitcher Buck O'Brien for the "clincher". McAleer's recommendation was apparently part of a strategy to ensure that the seventh game of the Series would be played at Boston's new Fenway Park. Although the Red Sox's loss to the Giants (at 5–2) guaranteed that the Series would conclude in Boston, the incident created conflict between McAleer and Stahl. Subsequent press releases suggesting that Stahl would replace McAleer as club president exacerbated these tensions.

In the seventh game of the Series, the Red Sox opened Fenway Park with a 7–6 victory over the Giants. The team suffered a public relations fiasco, however, when a Red Sox shareholder sold seats at the stadium that had been reserved for the club's most ardent fans, the "Royal Rooters". Finding themselves without seats, the Royal Rooters, led by Boston Mayor John "Honey Fitz" Fitzgerald, marched around the stadium in protest. A riot ensued, and in the aftermath of the disturbance, only 17,000 Boston residents showed up for the final game. Nevertheless, the Red Sox emerged as victors, with a final score of 4–3 and one tied game.

Following the Series victory over the Giants, McAleer returned to his hometown to celebrate the event. A brass band met him at Youngstown's train depot, and a parade and fireworks display were held in his honor. The Youngstown Daily Vindicator reported: "As the auto bearing Mr. McAleer turned into West Federal Street, hundreds of sticks of red fire were burning at Central Square, while the quiet atmosphere was occasionally punctured by the explosion of a bomb".

=== Downfall ===
McAleer's tenure as part-owner of the Red Sox came to a swift end. On July 15, 1913, McAleer became involved in a dispute with the AL president, Ban Johnson, when McAleer forced the resignation of Red Sox manager Jake Stahl, one of Johnson's closest friends. While McAleer claimed that he released Stahl because of a foot injury preventing Stahl from serving as a player-manager, rumors suggested that the two men had strong personal differences. Following a bitter quarrel with Johnson, McAleer sold his holdings in the Red Sox. His feud with Johnson turned out to be a lifelong affair, despite efforts taken by their mutual friend, Charles Comiskey, to smooth over the rift. While McAleer never publicly discussed the disagreement that spurred his retirement, he supposedly relayed his version of events to Frank B. Ward, a sports reporter with The Youngstown Daily Vindicator, with the understanding that the details remain confidential until McAleer's death.

Ban Johnson in 1905

Although other sources tell a different story, Ward wrote that McAleer termed his "break" with Johnson as the result of a "betrayal" of trust. McAleer indicated that his controlling interest in the Red Sox entitled him to make all major decisions regarding the organization, Ward wrote. This view of McAleer's powers, however, was not shared by the club's manager, Stahl, the article added. To further complicate matters, Stahl's father-in-law, a Chicago-based banker, was reportedly a shareholder in the Red Sox. After one particularly heated exchange between Stahl and McAleer at the close of the 1912 season, Stahl went to Chicago to confer with Johnson. The article indicated that, after this meeting, Johnson sent McAleer a "sternly worded" letter, which may have been designed to preserve his relationship with Stahl and Stahl's father-in-law. According to the article, Johnson later confided to McAleer that he owed Stahl's father-in-law money and therefore felt obliged to take Stahl's side in the dispute. McAleer, however, took the admonition from Johnson as a betrayal of their friendship, refused to accept Johnson's explanations, and promptly retired, Ward wrote. This version of events is largely corroborated by the early research of baseball historian David Fleitz.

Baseball historians Dewey and Acocella, however, described a markedly different scenario in which Johnson secretly sold off McAleer's shares while McAleer was away on a 1913 world tour with Comiskey, New York Giants manager John McGraw, and members of the Red Sox team. According to this account, McAleer's conflict with Stahl was followed up by his involvement in a feud between two pairs of players – Tris Speaker and Joe "Smoky Joe" Wood, on one side, and Heinie Wagner and Bill Carrigan, on the other. The conflict had a "religious dimension" and was described in the press as "pitting Masons against members of the Knights of Columbus". McAleer evidently supported Wagner and Carrigan, the Catholic players in the dispute. These back-to-back incidents involving individuals associated with the Red Sox team "reinforced Johnson's belief that the club president was the source of all the trouble", Dewey and Acocella wrote. In his recent book, The Irish in Baseball, David Fleitz observed that McAleer's abrupt dismissal was typical of Johnson, "who had a history of ending relationships when they no longer benefited him personally".

== Personal life ==
Relatively little is known about McAleer's private life. Research suggests that he was married three times, with his first marriage (to Hannah McAleer) taking place in the early 20th century. At some point, he married the former Anna Durbin, a native of Trenton, New Jersey. The couple had no children. According to her obituary, Anna McAleer was her husband's "constant companion" during his "active career as a baseball magnate". When the couple settled in Youngstown in 1913, she participated in charity work and joined the Altar and Rosary Society at St. Columba's Church, where she attended religious services. In 1930, Anna McAleer died suddenly at an apartment the couple shared on the north side of Youngstown. James McAleer, who discovered his wife's body after returning from a walk, was "overcome". McAleer had recently been released from a local hospital following an appendicectomy; he was quickly readmitted following his wife's death.

A few months later, McAleer married a Youngstown woman, Georgianna Rudge, a graduate of the Juilliard School of Music who was almost 23 years her husband's junior. Ultimately, Georgianna McAleer survived her husband by more than five decades. By the time of James McAleer's second marriage, his health was in decline. He was hospitalized within a few months of the wedding.

== Final years ==
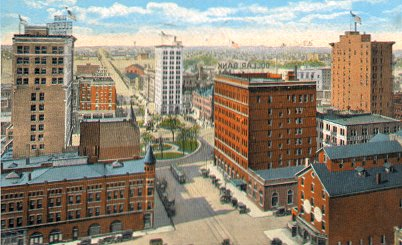
Youngstown, Ohio (1910s)

McAleer returned to Youngstown, where he spent his last years. Active in the community, McAleer served on the city's original draft board, which had been authorized under Ohio Governor James M. Cox during World War I. In retirement, the former baseball manager maintained friendships with celebrities including George M. Cohan and King Alfonso XIII of Spain. McAleer became acquainted with the Spanish monarch during a European tour with the Red Sox in the winter of 1912–13.

His final years were marked by poor health. Several weeks before his death, McAleer was admitted to a local hospital, where his health reportedly improved. This account, however, differs from that of baseball historian David Fleitz, who suggested that McAleer had been diagnosed with cancer in the early 1930s. In any event, McAleer died suddenly on April 29, 1931, shortly after being released from the hospital. He was 66 years old. After a private funeral service at Orr's funeral home, the remains were interred at Oak Hill Cemetery, on Youngstown's near south side. Apart from his widow, he left behind two brothers, J.C. McAleer of Austintown, Ohio, and Owen McAleer of Los Angeles. Other survivors included two nephews, Captain Charlies McAleer, an officer in the U.S. Army, and James McAleer of Los Angeles.

Rumors persist that McAleer's death was the result of a self-inflicted gunshot wound to the head. While his name is included on some lists of Major League Baseball players who died by suicide, contemporary newspaper accounts indicate McAleer died of natural causes.

== Legacy ==
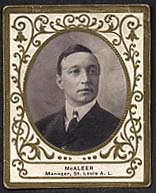
James R. McAleer in 1909

McAleer's hometown newspaper, The Youngstown Daily Vindicator, eulogized the ex-Major Leaguer in the following terms: "Forceful and resourceful, but always retiring when there was talk of his share in the development of baseball, James R. McAleer died within a matter of weeks after the passing of Byron Bancroft Johnson, his chief partner in the forming of the American League, and the man with whom he 'broke', which break brought about his retirement".

The article praised McAleer for assisting the careers of other baseball figures. In 1905, during his tenure as manager of the St. Louis Browns, McAleer helped future Hall of Fame umpire Billy Evans secure a position with the American League, writing a personal letter to Johnson on Evans' behalf. Meanwhile, McAleer served as a contact for another Youngstown resident, John "Bonesetter" Reese, the Welsh-born "baseball doctor" who worked with players such as Cy Young, Ty Cobb, Rogers Hornsby, Walter Johnson, and John McGraw.

McAleer's contributions to the game failed to win him a place in the Baseball Hall of Fame, however. In 1936, during the first elections to the Baseball Hall of Fame, he received just one vote in the balloting for 19th-century figures. Nevertheless, McAleer received an unofficial endorsement from Hall of Fame second baseman Nap Lajoie, who described McAleer as "one of the best ever". McAleer's obituary in The New York Times suggested that he was "one of the fastest outfielders the major leagues ever produced". In 2003, Bill James described McAleer as "the best defensive outfielder of the 1890s". More recently, baseball historian David Fleitz observed, "this brilliant defensive outfielder was a smart, clever, and ambitious man who helped to create two of the original eight franchises of the American League".

== See also ==
- List of Major League Baseball career stolen bases leaders
- List of Major League Baseball player-managers

== Notes ==
Sporting positions
Preceded by John I. Taylor (purchased 50% interest in 1912)	Owner of the Boston Red Sox; 1912–1913 (with John I. Taylor)	Succeeded by Joseph Lannin (bought McAleer's interest)
Preceded by John I. Taylor	Boston Red Sox President; 1911–1913	Succeeded by Joseph Lannin
