= Charlie Gibson (1900s catcher) =

American baseball player (1879–1954)

- Catcher
- Born: November 17, 1879; Sharon, Pennsylvania
- Died: November 22, 1954 (aged 75); Sharon, Pennsylvania
- Batted: Right Threw: Right

MLB debut
- September 23, 1905, for the St. Louis Browns

Last MLB appearance
- September 23, 1905, for the St. Louis Browns

MLB statistics
- Batting average: .000
- Games played: 1
- At bats: 3
- Stats at Baseball Reference

Teams
- St. Louis Browns (1905)

Charles Ellsworth Gibson (November 17 1879 – November 22, 1954) was a Major League Baseball catcher. He played one game for the St. Louis Browns in 1905, with no hits in three at bats

== Sources ==
- Career statistics from Baseball Reference · Baseball Reference (Minors) · Retrosheet · Baseball Almanac
