= Moxie Manuel =

American baseball player (1881–1924)

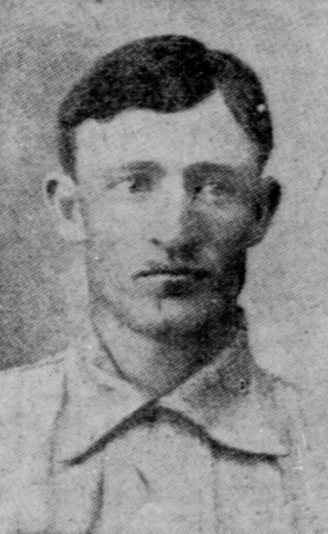
- Pitcher
- Born: October 16, 1881; Metropolis, Illinois, U.S.
- Died: April 26, 1924 (aged 42); Memphis, Tennessee, U.S.
- Batted: Right Threw: Both

MLB debut
- September 25, 1905, for the Washington Senators

Last MLB appearance
- September 14, 1908, for the Chicago White Sox

MLB statistics
- Win–loss record: 3–4
- Earned run average: 3.58
- Strikeouts: 28
- Stats at Baseball Reference

Teams
- Washington Senators (1905); Chicago White Sox (1908)

Mark Garfield "Moxie" Manuel (October 16, 1881 – April 26, 1924) was an American professional baseball player who pitched in the Major Leagues from 1905 to 1908.

== Biography ==
He played for the Washington Senators and Chicago White Sox. He was born in Metropolis, Illinois on October 16, 1881, and was Jewish.

After leaving the major leagues, he played second base for several amateur teams. He lived in Pascola and Hayti, Missouri and ran a mercantile business in Pascola.

He died at St. Joseph's Hospital in Memphis, Tennessee on April 26, 1924.
