= Frank Roth =

American baseball player (1878–1955)

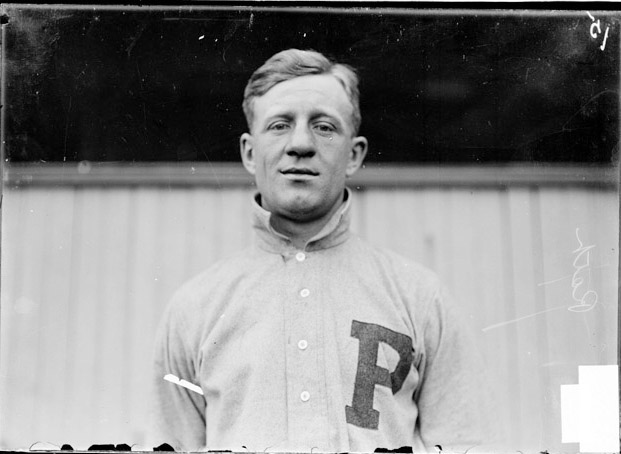
- Catcher
- Born: October 11, 1878; Chicago, Illinois, U.S.
- Died: March 27, 1955 (aged 76); Burlington, Wisconsin, U.S.
- Batted: Right Threw: Right

MLB debut
- April 18, 1903, for the Philadelphia Phillies

Last MLB appearance
- October 9, 1910, for the Cincinnati Reds

MLB statistics
- Batting average: .250
- Home runs: 1
- Runs batted in: 75
- Stats at Baseball Reference

Teams
- Philadelphia Phillies (1903–1904); St. Louis Browns (1905); Chicago White Sox (1906); Cincinnati Reds (1909–1910)

Francis Charles Roth (October 11, 1878 – March 27, 1955) was an American professional baseball catcher. He played in Major League Baseball (MLB) from 1903 to 1910 for the Philadelphia Phillies, St. Louis Browns, Chicago White Sox, and Cincinnati Reds.

Roth's brother was former Major League outfielder Braggo Roth.

== Sources ==
- Career statistics from Baseball Reference, or Baseball Reference (Minors)
