= Tubby Spencer =

American baseball player (1884–1945)

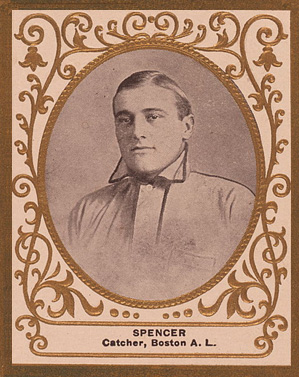
- Catcher
- Born: January 26, 1884; Oil City, Pennsylvania, U.S.
- Died: February 1, 1945 (aged 61); San Francisco, California, U.S.
- Batted: Right Threw: Right

MLB debut
- July 23, 1905, for the St. Louis Browns

Last MLB appearance
- September 1, 1918, for the Detroit Tigers

MLB statistics
- Batting average: .225
- Home runs: 3
- Runs batted in: 133
- Stats at Baseball Reference

Teams
- St. Louis Browns (1905–1908); Boston Red Sox (1909); Philadelphia Phillies (1911); Detroit Tigers (1916–1918)

Edward Russell "Tubby" Spencer (January 26, 1884 – February 1, 1945) was an American catcher for the St. Louis Browns (1905–08), Boston Red Sox (1909), Philadelphia Phillies (1911), and Detroit Tigers (1916–18).

He led the American League in being hit by pitches (9) in 1917. In nine seasons he played in 449 games and had 1,326 at bats, 106 runs, 298 hits, 43 doubles, 10 triples, 3 home runs, 133 RBI, 13 stolen bases, 87 walks, .225 batting average, .281 on-base percentage, .279 slugging percentage, 370 total bases, and 27 sacrifice hits.

He died in San Francisco, California at the age of 61.
