= Harry Barton (baseball) =

American baseball player (1875-1955)

- Catcher
- Born: January 20, 1875; Chester, Pennsylvania, U.S.
- Died: January 25, 1955 (aged 80); Upland, Pennsylvania, U.S.
- Batted: Both Threw: Right

MLB debut
- April 15, 1905, for the Philadelphia Athletics

Last MLB appearance
- September 26, 1905, for the Philadelphia Athletics

MLB statistics
- Batting average: .167
- Home runs: 0
- Runs batted in: 3
- Stats at Baseball Reference

Teams
- Philadelphia Athletics (1905)

Harry Lamb Barton (January 20, 1875 in Chester, Pennsylvania – January 25, 1955 in Upland, Pennsylvania) was an American professional baseball player who played catcher in the Major Leagues in 1905. He played for the Philadelphia Athletics.
