= Pop Rising =

American baseball player (1877-1938)

- Outfielder
- Born: January 24, 1877; Industry, Pennsylvania, U.S.
- Died: January 28, 1938 (aged 61); Rochester, Pennsylvania, U.S.
- Batted: Unknown Threw: Right

MLB debut
- August 10, 1905, for the Boston Americans

Last MLB appearance
- October 6, 1905, for the Boston Americans

MLB statistics
- Batting average: .103
- Home runs: 0
- Runs batted in: 2
- Stats at Baseball Reference

Teams
- Boston Americans (1905)

Percival Sumner "Pop" Rising (January 24, 1877 – January 28, 1938) was an American right fielder in Major League Baseball who played briefly for the Boston Americans during the 1905 season.

== Biography ==
Rising was born in Industry, Pennsylvania on January 24, 1877. He threw right-handed (unknown batting side). His contract was purchased by the Boston Americans from the New London, Connecticut team for $1,200 on August 8, 1905.

During his eleven-game career, Rising was a .103 hitter (3-for-29) with two runs, two RBI, one double and one triple without home runs. In six outfield appearances, he never committed an error in nine chances for a perfect 1.000 fielding percentage. He also played an errorless game at third base (two chances).

== Death ==
Rising died at the age of fifty-six in Rochester, Pennsylvania on January 28, 1938.
