= Joseph Myers =

American baseball player (1882–1956)

- Pitcher
- Born: March 18, 1882; Wilmington, Delaware, U.S.
- Died: February 11, 1956 (aged 73); Delaware City, Delaware, U.S.
- Batted: Right Threw: Right

MLB debut
- October 7, 1905, for the Philadelphia Athletics

Last MLB appearance
- October 7, 1905, for the Philadelphia Athletics

MLB statistics
- Win–loss record: 0–0
- Earned run average: 3.60
- Strikeouts: 5
- Stats at Baseball Reference

Teams
- Philadelphia Athletics (1905)

Joseph William Myers (March 18, 1882 – February 11, 1956) was an American pitcher in Major League Baseball, born in Wilmington, Delaware. He stood at 5 ft 10 in (1.78 m) and weighed 205 lbs.

Myers started his organized baseball career on October 7, 1905, with the American League's Philadelphia Athletics. In his only major league start, he pitched a five-inning complete game, allowing two earned runs.

Myers then spent 1906 to 1912 in the Tri-State League. He played in York, Reading, Harrisburg, and Trenton before settling in with the Harrisburg Senators for four seasons. In 1911, he set his career-high in wins, with 19.

Myers died in 1956 in Delaware City, Delaware.
