= Doc Powers =

American baseball player (1870–1909)

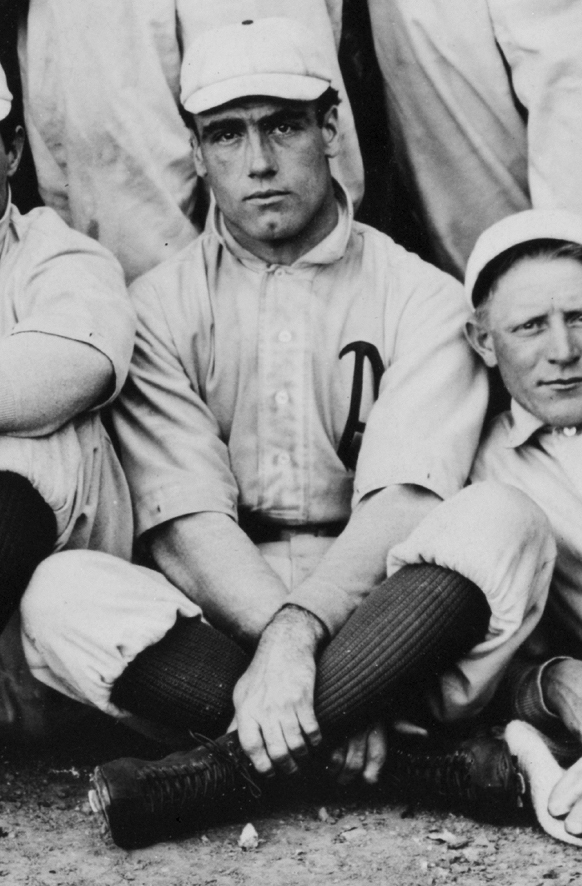
- Catcher
- Born: September 22, 1870; Pittsfield, Massachusetts, U.S.
- Died: April 26, 1909 (aged 38); Philadelphia, Pennsylvania, U.S.
- Batted: Right Threw: Right

MLB debut
- July 12, 1898, for the Louisville Colonels

Last MLB appearance
- April 12, 1909, for the Philadelphia Athletics

MLB statistics
- Batting average: .216
- Home runs: 4
- Runs batted in: 199
- Stats at Baseball Reference

Teams
- Louisville Colonels (1898–1899); Washington Senators (1899); Philadelphia Athletics (1901–1905); New York Highlanders (1905); Philadelphia Athletics (1905–1909)

Michael Riley "Doc" Powers (September 22, 1870 – April 26, 1909) was an American Major League Baseball player who caught for four teams from 1898 to 1909.

Powers played for the Louisville Colonels and Washington Senators of the National League, and the Philadelphia Athletics and New York Highlanders of the American League.

He played college baseball at College of the Holy Cross and at the University of Notre Dame in 1897 and 1898.

Powers' nickname was derived honestly from the fact he was a licensed physician as well as a ballplayer. During a brief stint with the New York Highlanders in 1905, Powers caught while Jim "Doc" Newton pitched, creating the only known example of a two-physician battery in Major League history.

According to ESPN's website, on April 12, 1909, Powers was injured during the first game played in Philadelphia's Shibe Park, crashing into a wall while chasing a foul pop-up. He sustained internal injuries from the collision and died two weeks later from complications from three intestinal surgeries, which would make him possibly the first Major Leaguer to suffer an on-field injury that eventually led to his death. Stew Thornley states in Land of the Giants that the immediate cause of death was peritonitis arising from post-surgery infections. Jason Olivier of the Society for American Baseball Research, however, disputes this; he asserts that he could find no proof that this collision ever occurred, and that Powers's true cause of death was intussusception, which resulted in gangrene and dilation of the heart.

He was interred at New Cathedral Cemetery in Philadelphia.

== See also ==
- List of baseball players who died during their careers
