= Beany Jacobson =

American baseball player (1881-1933)

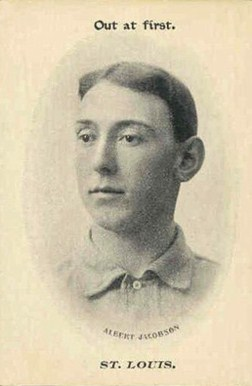
- Pitcher
- Born: June 5, 1881; Timrå, Sweden
- Died: January 31, 1933 (aged 51); Decatur, Illinois, U.S.
- Batted: Left Threw: Left

MLB debut
- April 30, 1904, for the Washington Senators

Last MLB appearance
- June 24, 1907, for the Boston Americans

MLB statistics
- Win–loss record: 23–46
- Strikeouts: 195
- Earned run average: 3.19
- Stats at Baseball Reference

Teams
- Washington Senators (1904–1905); St. Louis Browns (1906–1907); Boston Americans (1907)

Albert (Note: born Albin) Leonard Jacobson (June 5, 1881 – January 31, 1933) was an American professional baseball pitcher who played for three different major league teams between 1904 and 1907. Listed at 6 ft 0 in (1.83 m), 170 lb., he batted and threw left-handed.

Jacobson was born in Timrå, Sweden. He always was a bad luck pitcher either due to injury or playing on a bad baseball team. He entered the majors in 1904 with the Washington Senators, playing for them two years before joining the St. Louis Browns (1906–1997) and Boston Americans (1907).

Jacobson went 6–23 in his rookie season for the last-place 1904 Senators, despite a 3.55 earned run average and career-best numbers in strikeouts (75) and innings pitched (253 2/3. At the end of 1905, he was sent by Washington to the Browns in the same transaction that brought Willie Sudhoff to the Senators. His most productive season came in 1906 with St. Louis, when he went 9–9 with a career-high 2.50 earned run average. A year later, he suffered arm problems and was dealt to Boston in exchange for Bill Dineen. He had a combined 1–6 mark in only nine appearances and never played a major league game again.

In a four-season career, Jacobson posted a 23–46 record with 195 strikeouts and a 3.19 earned run average in 88 games, including 70 starts, 53 complete games, one shutout, and 612 1/3 innings of work.

After that, Jacobson played for several minor league teams. He enjoyed a good season with the 1911 Kalamazoo Celery Pickers champion team of the Southern Michigan League, when he led the league pitchers with 26 wins and a .743 winning percentage.

Jacobson died in Decatur, Illinois, at the age of 51.

== Sources ==
- Baseball Reference
- Retrosheet
