= Jack Powell (pitcher, born 1874) =

American baseball player (1874–1944)

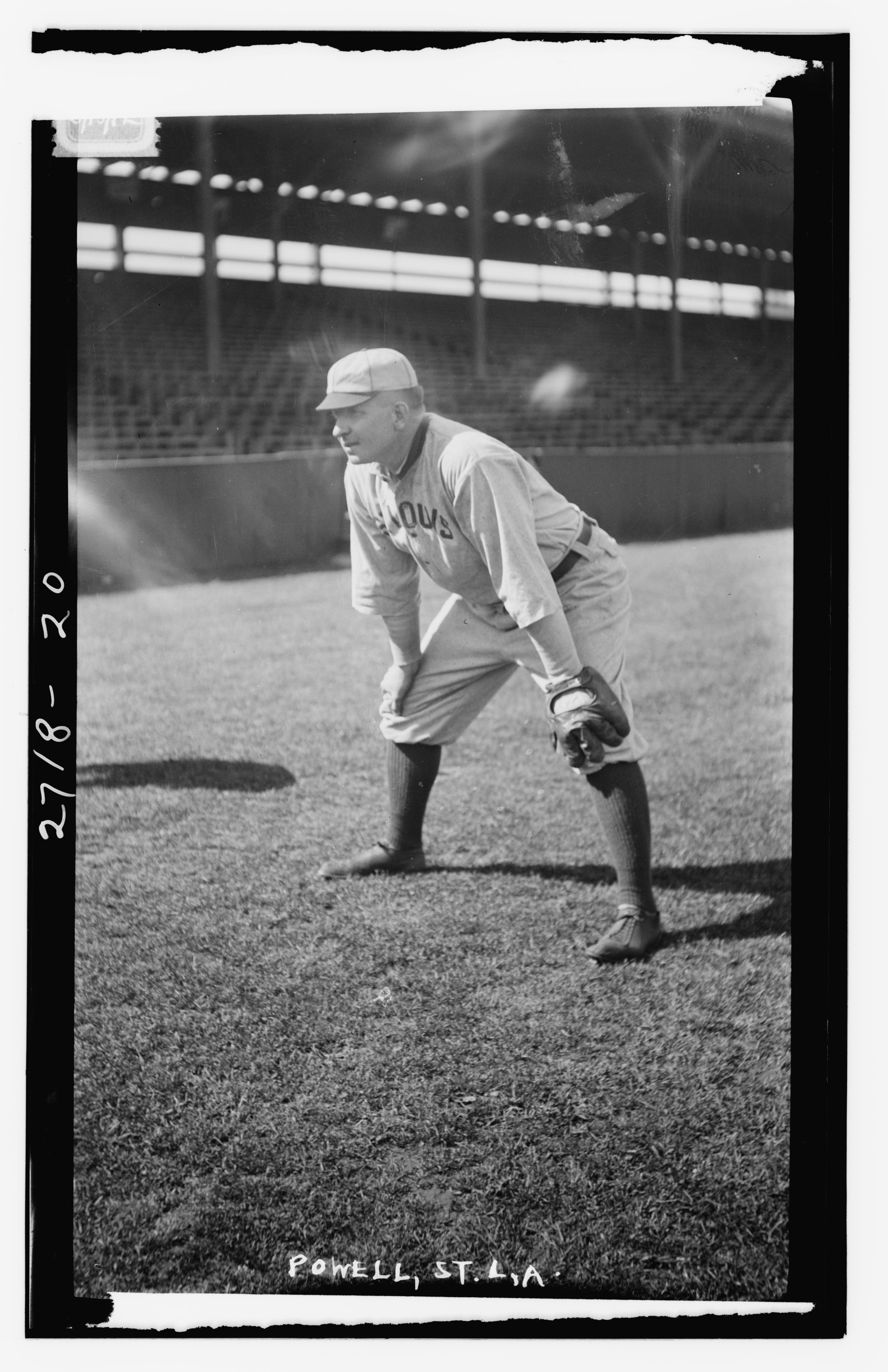
- Powell c. 1912
- Pitcher
- Born: July 9, 1874; Bloomington, Illinois, U.S.
- Died: October 17, 1944 (aged 70); Chicago, Illinois, U.S.
- Batted: Right Threw: Right

MLB debut
- June 23, 1897, for the Cleveland Spiders

Last MLB appearance
- September 24, 1912, for the St. Louis Browns

MLB statistics
- Win–loss record: 245–254
- Earned run average: 2.97
- Strikeouts: 1,621
- Stats at Baseball Reference

Teams
- Cleveland Spiders (1897–1898); St. Louis Perfectos/Cardinals (1899–1901); St. Louis Browns (1902–1903); New York Highlanders (1903–1905); St. Louis Browns (1905–1912)

John Joseph Powell (July 9, 1874 – October 17, 1944) was an American Major League Baseball pitcher at the end of the 19th century and the turn of the 20th century. He had a relatively successful 16-year career, which lasted from 1897 to 1912 – he won 245 games, but also lost 254 games. So, despite his impressive 2.97 career ERA, he holds the record for most wins by a pitcher with a career losing record.

Powell was born in Bloomington, Illinois. He made his debut with the Cleveland Spiders in 1897, and by 1898 he became one of the best pitchers on the team. His 23 wins trailed only teammate Cy Young. He was one of the star players sold to the St. Louis Browns before the 1899 season. He won 23 games again that year, which was three more than the Spiders had all year. After three successful seasons, he was lured to the new American League in 1902, where he pitched for the St. Louis Browns.

Powell was traded to the New York Highlanders before the 1904 season, where he went 23–19. However, after an 8–13 start in 1905, he was traded back to the Browns. By this time, the Browns had become one of the worst teams in the league. He had a 2.50 ERA over the last seven years of his career, but posted a 78–106 record. This was due partially to low run support, and partially to poor defense. Of the 619 runs he allowed in these seven years, 189 of them were unearned.

Powell retired after the 1912 season. He died in Chicago in 1944.

== See also ==
- List of Major League Baseball career wins leaders
- List of Major League Baseball annual saves leaders
- List of Major League Baseball career hit batsmen leaders
- List of Major League Baseball career losses leaders
