= Jim Buchanan (baseball) =

American baseball player (1876-1949)

- Pitcher
- Born: July 1, 1876; Chatham Hill, Smyth County, Virginia, U.S.
- Died: June 15, 1949 (aged 72); Norfolk, Nebraska, U.S.
- Batted: Left Threw: Right

MLB debut
- April 16, 1905, for the St. Louis Browns

Last MLB appearance
- October 7, 1905, for the St. Louis Browns

MLB statistics
- Win–loss record: 5–9
- Earned run average: 3.50
- Strikeouts: 54
- Stats at Baseball Reference

Teams
- St. Louis Browns (1905)

James Forrest Buchanan (July 1, 1876 – June 15, 1949) was an American professional baseball player. He was a right-handed pitcher over parts of one season (1905) with the St. Louis Browns. For his career, he compiled a 5–9 record in 22 appearances, with a 3.50 earned run average and 54 strikeouts. Buchanan attended Austin College and Midland Lutheran College.

== See also ==
- List of Major League Baseball annual saves leaders
