= Charlie Fallon =

American baseball player (1881–1960)

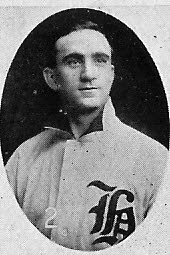
- Born: March 7, 1881; New York, New York, U.S.
- Died: June 10, 1960 (aged 79); Kings Park, New York, U.S.
- Batted: Right Threw: Right

MLB debut
- June 30, 1905, for the New York Highlanders

Last MLB appearance
- June 30, 1905, for the New York Highlanders

MLB statistics
- Games played: 1
- At bats: 0
- Hits: 0
- Stats at Baseball Reference

Teams
- New York Highlanders (1905)

Charles Augustus Fallon (March 7, 1881 – June 10, 1960) was an American professional baseball player. Fallon appeared in one Major League Baseball game as a pinch runner for the New York Highlanders. He batted and threw right-handed.

Fallon was born in New York, New York, and died in Kings Park, New York.
