= Fred Glade =

American baseball player (1876-1934)

- Pitcher
- Born: January 25, 1876; Dubuque, Iowa, U.S.
- Died: November 21, 1934 (aged 58); Grand Island, Nebraska, U.S.
- Batted: Right Threw: Right

MLB debut
- May 27, 1902, for the Chicago Orphans

Last MLB appearance
- June 21, 1908, for the New York Highlanders

MLB statistics
- Win–loss record: 52–68
- Earned run average: 2.62
- Strikeouts: 464
- Stats at Baseball Reference

Teams
- Chicago Orphans (1902); St. Louis Browns (1904–1907); New York Highlanders (1908)

Frederick Monroe Glade (January 25, 1876 – November 21, 1934) was an American starting pitcher in Major League Baseball. From 1902 through 1908, Glade played for the Chicago Orphans (1902), St. Louis Browns (1904–1907) and New York Highlanders (1908). A native of Dubuque, Iowa, he batted and threw right-handed. He debuted on May 27, 1902, and played his final game on June 21, 1908.

Glade was playing baseball by 1899, when he "made about as beautiful a slide on a run to second has been seen in many a day" in a game between teams from Stromsburg and Grand Island. In 1902 Glade appeared in one game for the Chicago National League team. He jumped to the American League in 1904 and gave four years of good services for the awful St. Louis Browns. In his rookie season he went 18–15 with a 2.27 ERA. In addition, on June 19 he set a major league game-record, since then broken, with 15 strikeouts in a 1–0 victory over the New York Highlanders. But Glade led the league with 25 losses in 1905, winning only six games with a solid 2.81 ERA. He rebounded with two winning seasons in 1906 (15-14, 2.36) and 1907 (13-9, 2.67). He was traded to the Highlanders before 1908, his last major league season.

In a six-season career, Glade posted a 52–68 record with a 2.62 ERA in 1072 2/3 innings pitched, including 14 shutouts and 107 complete games. A good control pitcher, he recorded a 1.96 strikeout-to-walk ratio (464-to-237).

In the off-season, Glade worked at the flour mill he owned with his brother, in Abilene, Kansas. He died in Grand Island, Nebraska, at age 58.

== Fact ==
- On August 3, 1906 at Sportsman's Park, Glade faced Long Tom Hughes and the Washington Senators, entering the 10th inning with a scoreless tie, until Hughes decided the game with a solo home run for a 1–0 victory, becoming the first pitcher in major league history to pitch a shutout and hit a home run which accounted for the only run in the game.
