= George Stone (outfielder) =

American baseball player (1876-1945)

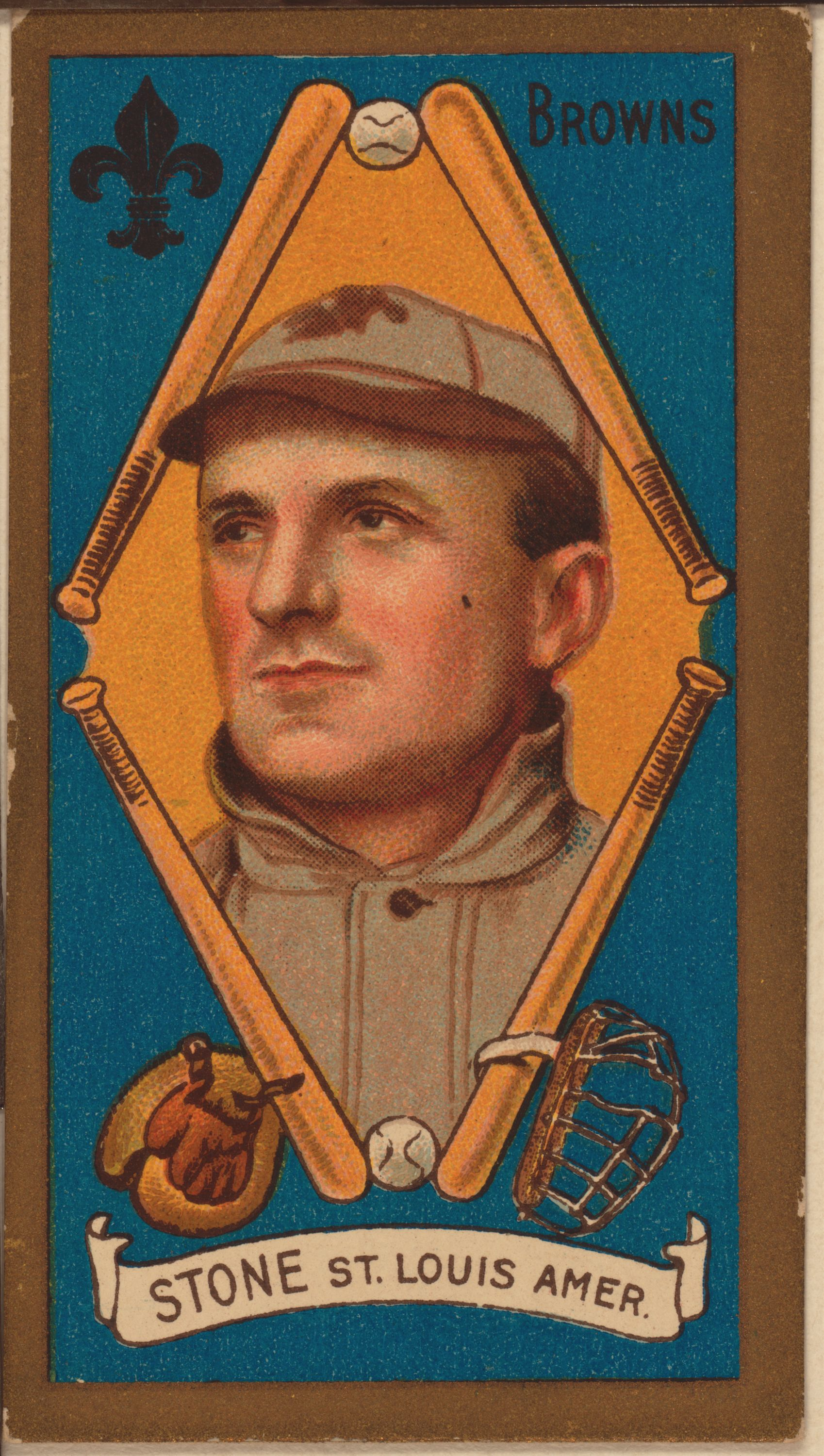
- Left fielder
- Born: September 3, 1876; Lost Nation, Iowa, U.S.
- Died: January 3, 1945 (aged 68); Clinton, Iowa, U.S.
- Batted: Left Threw: Left

MLB debut
- April 20, 1903, for the Boston Americans

Last MLB appearance
- October 9, 1910, for the St. Louis Browns

MLB statistics
- Batting average: .301
- Home runs: 23
- Runs batted in: 268
- Stats at Baseball Reference

Teams
- Boston Americans (1903); St. Louis Browns (1905–1910)

Career highlights and awards
- AL batting champion (1906)

George Robert Stone, nicknamed Silent George, (September 3, 1876 – January 3, 1945) was an American left fielder in Major League Baseball who played for the Boston Red Sox (1903) and St. Louis Browns (1905–10). Stone batted and threw left-handed. He was the 1906 American League batting champion.

== Early life ==
Stone was born in Lost Nation, Iowa, to George and Hannah Stone. Prior to playing baseball, he had a career in banking in Nebraska. A 1906 article on him noted that his taste ran to reading, and his hobby was violin playing.

== Baseball career ==
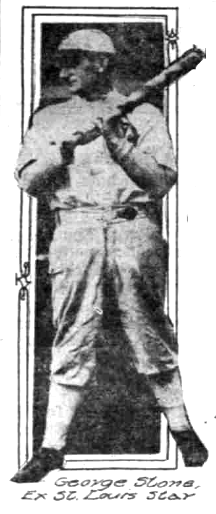
Newspaper photo from 1912

He left his career in banking in 1901 at the age of 24 to join the Omaha Omahogs of the Western League. In 1902 he played for the Omahogs and the Peoria Distillers and led the league with 198 hits, and the next year he again played for the Omahogs.

He made his major league debut in 1903 at the age of 26 with the Boston Americans. He played most of 1903 for the Milwaukee Creams of the Western League. In 1903 with the Creams he was third in the Western League in home runs (4).

In 1904 with the Milwaukee Brewers he led the American Association in batting with a .406 batting average (which remained the league record until the league closed down in 1997), in slugging with a .558 average, and in hits (254), as he was second in the league in triples (19).

In December 1904 he was traded by the Boston Americans to the St. Louis Browns for Jesse Burkett and cash. In 1905 he led the American League in hits (187) and total bases (259), and was second in home runs (7).

In 1906, he batted .358 and won the American League batting championship (beating four-time batting champion Napoleon Lajoie), and also led the league in slugging (.501) and in on-base percentage (.417), as he was second in the league in hits (208; behind Lajoie) and triples (20; behind Elmer Flick), and third in home runs (6). In 1907 he batted .320.

In 1907 he was second in the AL in on-base percentage (.387) and hits (191; behind Ty Cobb), and third in the league in batting after hitting .320 (behind Cobb and Sam Crawford). In 1908, he was third in the American League in home runs (5). He played his last game in 1910.

In a seven-season major league career, Stone posted a .301 batting average (984-for-3271) with 23 home runs and 268 RBIs in 848 games played.

He is the only player who won the American League batting title in the years from 1901 through 1928, who was not made a member of the Baseball Hall of Fame.

== Later life ==
Stone entered the banking industry in Coleridge, Nebraska, and owned a Western League team in Lincoln, Nebraska in 1916. In 1940, he and his wife Pearl moved to Clinton, Iowa. Stone died of a heart attack in Clinton at the age of 68. The burial was at Coleridge Cemetery, in Coleridge, Nebraska.

In 1970 he was inducted into The Des Moines Register's Iowa Sports Hall of Fame.

== See also ==
- List of Major League Baseball batting champions
