= 1905 Major League Baseball season =

1905 MLB season
- League: American League (AL); National League (NL)
- Sport: Baseball
- Duration: Regular season: April 14 – October 8, 1905; World Series: October 9–14, 1905
- Games: 154
- Teams: 16 (8 per league)

Pennant winners
- AL champions: Philadelphia Athletics
- AL runners-up: Chicago White Sox
- NL champions: New York Giants
- NL runners-up: Pittsburgh Pirates

World Series
- Champions: New York Giants
- Runners-up: Philadelphia Athletics

MLB seasons
- ← 1904 1906 →

Locations of teams for the 1904–1907 American League seasons
American League
Locations of teams for the 1903–1906 National League seasons
National League

The 1905 major league baseball season began on April 14, 1905. The regular season ended October 8, with the New York Giants and the Philadelphia Athletics as regular season champions of the National League and American League, respectively. The postseason began with Game 1 of the second modern World Series on October 9 and ended with Game 5 on October 14. The Giants defeated the Athletics, four games to one, capturing their first modern (Note: the Giants previously won two pre-modern World Series in 1888 and 1889.) championship in franchise history.

Stung by criticism from fans and writers for his team's refusal to play in the previous season's World Series, Giants owner John T. Brush drafted rules during the offseason to formally establish the World Series as a compulsory event. Both leagues then adopted the agreement in mid-February 1905.

== Schedule ==
The 1905 schedule consisted of 154 games for all teams in the American League and National League, each of which had eight teams. Each team was scheduled to play 22 games against the other seven teams of their respective league. This continued the format put in place for the 1904 season. This format would last until 1919.

Opening Day took place on April 16 with all but the Detroit Tigers and Cleveland Naps playing. The final day of the regular season was on October 8. The World Series took place between October 9 and October 14.

== Teams ==
League	Team	City	Ballpark	Capacity	Manager
American League	Boston Americans	Boston, Massachusetts	Huntington Avenue Grounds	11,500	Jimmy Collins
American League	Chicago White Sox	Chicago, Illinois	South Side Park	14,000	Fielder Jones
American League	Cleveland Naps	Cleveland, Ohio	League Park (Cleveland)	9,000	Bill Bradley
American League	Cleveland Naps	Cleveland, Ohio	League Park (Cleveland)	9,000	Nap Lajoie
American League	Detroit Tigers	Detroit, Michigan	Bennett Park	8,500	Bill Armour
American League	New York Highlanders	New York, New York	Hilltop Park	16,000	Clark Griffith
American League	Philadelphia Athletics	Philadelphia, Pennsylvania	Columbia Park	13,600	Connie Mack
American League	St. Louis Browns	St. Louis, Missouri	Sportsman's Park	8,000	Jimmy McAleer
American League	Washington Senators	Washington, D.C.	National Park	9,000	Jake Stahl
National League	Boston Beaneaters	Boston, Massachusetts	South End Grounds	6,600	Fred Tenney
National League	Brooklyn Superbas	New York, New York	Washington Park	12,000	Ned Hanlon
National League	Chicago Cubs	Chicago, Illinois	West Side Park	14,200	Frank Selee
National League	Chicago Cubs	Chicago, Illinois	West Side Park	14,200	Frank Chance
National League	Cincinnati Reds	Cincinnati, Ohio	Palace of the Fans	12,000	Joe Kelley
National League	New York Giants	New York, New York	Polo Grounds	16,000	John McGraw
National League	Philadelphia Phillies	Philadelphia, Pennsylvania	National League Park	18,000	Hugh Duffy
National League	Pittsburgh Pirates	Allegheny, Pennsylvania	Exposition Park	16,000	Fred Clarke
National League	St. Louis Cardinals	St. Louis, Missouri	League Park (St. Louis)	15,200	Kid Nichols
National League	St. Louis Cardinals	St. Louis, Missouri	League Park (St. Louis)	15,200	Jimmy Burke
National League	St. Louis Cardinals	St. Louis, Missouri	League Park (St. Louis)	15,200	Stanley Robison

=== Sunday games ===
Blue laws restricted Sunday activities in several localities, causing the Detroit Tigers, in a rescheduled game, to play at a ballpark in a different locality.

Team	City	Ballpark	Capacity	Games played
Detroit Tigers	Columbus, Ohio	Neil Park	6,000	2

1. In today's Pittsburgh, Pennsylvania.

== Standings ==
=== American League ===
American League
Team	W	L	Pct.	GB	Home	Road
Philadelphia Athletics	92	56	.622	—	51‍–‍22	41‍–‍34
Chicago White Sox	92	60	.605	2	50‍–‍29	42‍–‍31
Detroit Tigers	79	74	.516	15½	45‍–‍30	34‍–‍44
Boston Americans	78	74	.513	16	44‍–‍32	34‍–‍42
Cleveland Naps	76	78	.494	19	41‍–‍36	35‍–‍42
New York Highlanders	71	78	.477	21½	40‍–‍35	31‍–‍43
Washington Senators	64	87	.424	29½	33‍–‍42	31‍–‍45
St. Louis Browns	54	99	.353	40½	34‍–‍42	20‍–‍57

=== National League ===
National League
Team	W	L	Pct.	GB	Home	Road
New York Giants	105	48	.686	—	54‍–‍21	51‍–‍27
Pittsburgh Pirates	96	57	.627	9	49‍–‍28	47‍–‍29
Chicago Cubs	92	61	.601	13	54‍–‍25	38‍–‍36
Philadelphia Phillies	83	69	.546	21½	39‍–‍36	44‍–‍33
Cincinnati Reds	79	74	.516	26	50‍–‍28	29‍–‍46
St. Louis Cardinals	58	96	.377	47½	32‍–‍45	26‍–‍51
Boston Beaneaters	51	103	.331	54½	29‍–‍46	22‍–‍57
Brooklyn Superbas	48	104	.316	56½	29‍–‍47	19‍–‍57

=== Tie games ===
19 tie games (11 in AL, 8 in NL), which are not factored into winning percentage or games behind (and were often replayed again), occurred throughout the season.

==== American League ====
- Boston Americans, 1
- Chicago White Sox, 6
- Cleveland Naps, 1
- Detroit Tigers, 1
- New York Highlanders, 3
- Philadelphia Athletics, 4
- St. Louis Browns, 3
- Washington Senators, 3

==== National League ====
- Boston Beaneaters, 2
- Brooklyn Superbas, 3
- Chicago Cubs, 2
- Cincinnati Reds, 2
- New York Giants, 2
- Philadelphia Phillies, 3
- Pittsburgh Pirates, 2

== Postseason ==
The postseason began on October 9 and ended on October 14 with the New York Giants defeating the Philadelphia Athletics in the 1905 World Series in five games.

=== Bracket ===
World Series
AL	Philadelphia Athletics	1
NL	New York Giants	4

== Managerial changes ==
=== Off-season ===
Team	Former Manager	New Manager
Cleveland Naps	Bill Armour	Bill Bradley
Detroit Tigers	Bobby Lowe	Bill Armour
Washington Senators	Patsy Donovan	Jake Stahl
Boston Beaneaters	Al Buckenberger	Fred Tenney

=== In-season ===
Team	Former Manager	New Manager
Cleveland Naps	Bill Bradley	Nap Lajoie
Chicago Cubs	Frank Selee	Frank Chance
St. Louis Cardinals	Kid Nichols	Jimmy Burke
St. Louis Cardinals	Jimmy Burke	Stanley Robison

== League leaders ==
=== American League ===
Hitting leaders
Stat	Player	Total
AVG	Elmer Flick (CLE)	.308
OPS	Elmer Flick (CLE)	.845
HR	Harry Davis (PHA)	8
RBI	Harry Davis (PHA)	83
R	Harry Davis (PHA)	93
H	George Stone (SLB)	187
SB	Danny Hoffman (PHA)	46

Pitching leaders
Stat	Player	Total
W	Rube Waddell^{1} (PHA)	27
L	Fred Glade (SLB)	25
ERA	Rube Waddell^{1} (PHA)	1.48
K	Rube Waddell^{1} (PHA)	287
IP	George Mullin (DET)	347.2
SV	Jim Buchanan (SLB)	2
WHIP	Cy Young (BOS)	0.867

^{1} American League Triple Crown pitching winner

=== National League ===
Hitting leaders
Stat	Player	Total
AVG	Cy Seymour (CIN)	.377
OPS	Cy Seymour (CIN)	.988
HR	Fred Odwell (CIN)	9
RBI	Cy Seymour (CIN)	121
R	Mike Donlin (NYG)	124
H	Cy Seymour (CIN)	219
SB	Art Devlin (NYG); Billy Maloney (CHC)	59

Pitching leaders
Stat	Player	Total
W	Christy Mathewson^{1} (NYG)	31
L	Vic Willis^{2} (BSN)	29
ERA	Christy Mathewson^{1} (NYG)	1.28
K	Christy Mathewson^{1} (NYG)	206
IP	Irv Young (BSN)	378.0
SV	Claude Elliott (NYG)	6
WHIP	Christy Mathewson (NYG)	0.933

^{1} National League Triple Crown pitching winner
^{2} Modern (1901–present) single-season losses record

== Milestones ==
=== Batters ===
- Bill Dahlen (NYG):
  - Recorded his 500th career stolen base against the Philadelphia Phillies on September 1. He became the 14th player to reach this mark.

=== Pitchers ===
==== No-hitters ====
- Christy Mathewson (NYG):
  - Mathewson threw his second career no-hitter and the third no-hitter in franchise history, by defeating the Chicago Cubs 1–0 on June 13. Mathewson walked none and struck out two. The only base-runners came on errors by Bill Dahlen and Billy Gilbert.
- Weldon Henley (PHA):
  - Henley threw his first career no-hitter and the first no-hitter in franchise history, by defeating the St. Louis Browns 6–0 of game 2 of a doubleheader on July 22. Henley walked three and struck out two.
- Frank Smith (CWS):
  - Smith threw his first career no-hitter and the second no-hitter in franchise history, by defeating the Detroit Tigers 15–0 of game 2 of a doubleheader on September 6. Smith walked three and struck out eight.
- Bill Dinneen (BOS):
  - Dinneen threw his first no-hitter and the third no-hitter in franchise history, by defeating the Chicago White Sox 2–0 of game 1 of a doubleheader on September 27. Dinneen walked none, hit one batter by pitch, and struck out two.

=== Miscellaneous ===
- Jack McCarthy (CHC):
  - Set a National League record and tied a Major League record (as the second player) to throw out three base runners at home plate on April 26, achieving the feat against the Pittsburgh Pirates.
- Boston Beaneaters / Brooklyn Dodgers:
  - For the first time in Major League history, two teams with at least 100 losses played each other, when the Brooklyn Superbas (103 losses) and Boston Beaneaters (100 losses) on game 2 of a doubleheader on October 5 met in their final series of the season. The game ends with Brooklyn defeating Boston.

== Home field attendance ==
Team name	Wins	%±	Home attendance	%±	Per game
Chicago White Sox	92	3.4%	687,419	23.4%	8,383
Philadelphia Athletics	92	13.6%	554,576	8.3%	7,494
New York Giants	105	−0.9%	552,700	−9.4%	7,272
Chicago Cubs	92	−1.1%	509,900	16.1%	6,295
Boston Americans	78	−17.9%	468,828	−24.8%	6,089
Pittsburgh Pirates	96	10.3%	369,124	8.4%	4,732
St. Louis Browns	54	−16.9%	339,112	6.6%	4,293
Philadelphia Phillies	83	59.6%	317,932	125.9%	4,183
Cleveland Naps	76	−11.6%	316,306	19.5%	4,108
Cincinnati Reds	79	−10.2%	313,927	−19.9%	3,974
New York Highlanders	71	−22.8%	309,100	−29.6%	4,121
St. Louis Cardinals	58	−22.7%	292,800	−24.3%	3,803
Washington Senators	64	68.4%	252,027	91.3%	3,273
Brooklyn Superbas	48	−14.3%	227,924	6.2%	2,960
Detroit Tigers	79	27.4%	193,384	8.8%	2,545
Boston Beaneaters	51	−7.3%	150,003	6.6%	1,974

== Venues ==
The Washington Senators' American League Park was renamed to National Park.

Due to horse races at main home ballpark, Bennett Park, the Detroit Tigers played two games at Neil Park in Columbus, Ohio, home of the Class A minor league Columbus Senators, on July 23 and 24.

== See also ==
- 1905 in baseball (Events, Births, Deaths)
