= List of cemeteries in Ohio =

This list of cemeteries in Ohio includes currently operating, historical (closed for new interments), and defunct (graves abandoned or removed) cemeteries, columbaria, and mausolea which are historical and/or notable. It does not include pet cemeteries.

== Clark County ==
- Ferncliff Cemetery in Springfield

== Champaign County ==
- Mount Tabor Methodist Episcopal Church in West Liberty; NRHP-listed

== Cuyahoga County ==
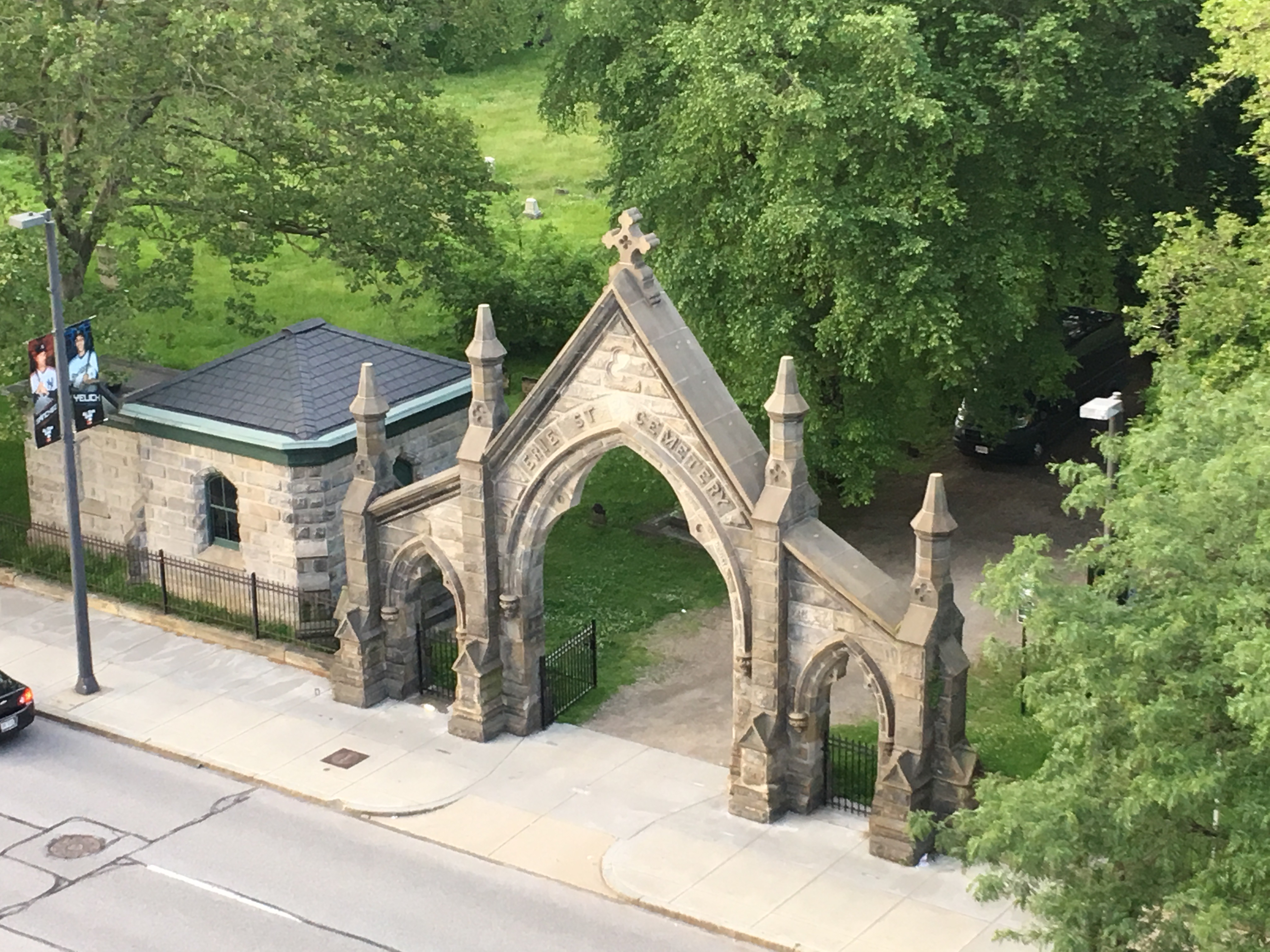
West gate of Erie Street Cemetery in Cleveland, Cuyahoga County

- Calvary Cemetery in Garfield Heights
- Erie Street Cemetery in Cleveland
- Holy Cross Cemetery in Brook Park
- Knollwood Cemetery in Mayfield Heights
- Lake View Cemetery in Cleveland
- Mayfield Cemetery in Cleveland Heights
- Monroe Street Cemetery in Cleveland
- Woodland Cemetery in Cleveland

== Darke County ==
- Greenville Mausoleum in Greenville; NRHP-listed

== Fayette County ==
- Washington Cemetery in Washington Court House; NRHP-listed

== Franklin County ==
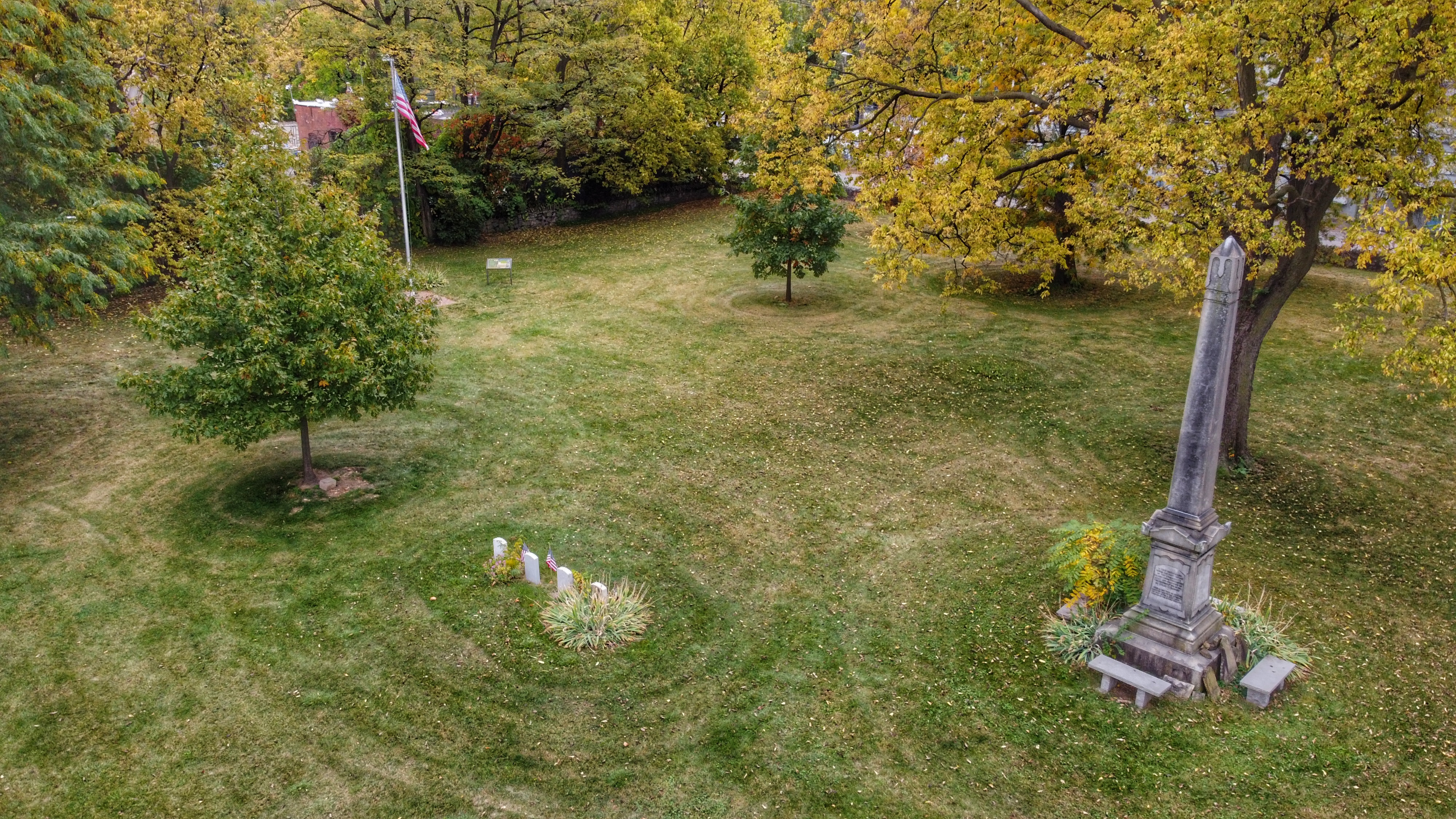
Old Franklinton Cemetery in Columbus, Franklin County

- Cemetery at Camp Chase in Columbus
- Green Lawn Cemetery in Columbus
- Mount Calvary Cemetery in Columbus
- North Graveyard in Columbus
- Old Franklinton Cemetery in Columbus
- Union Cemetery in Columbus

== Hamilton County ==
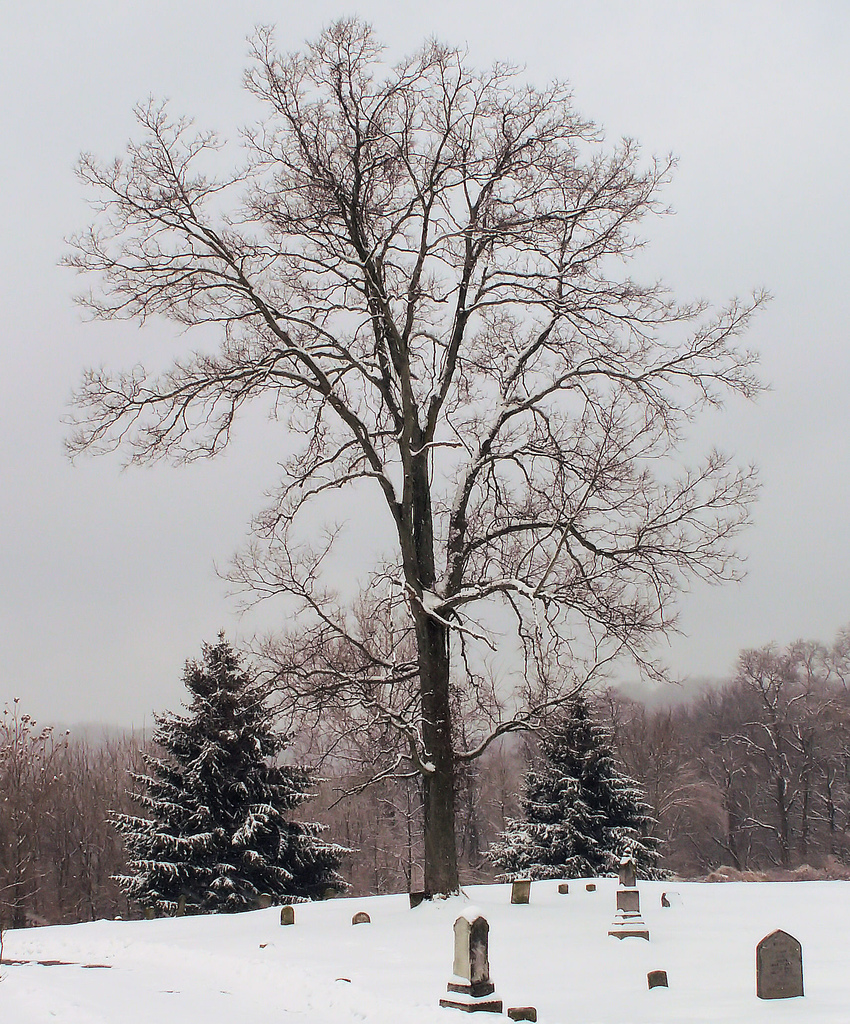
Wesleyan Cemetery in Cincinnati, Hamilton County

- Catherine Street Burying Ground in Cincinnati
- Congress Green Cemetery in North Bend
- Crown Hill Memorial Park in Pleasant Run
- Fulton-Presbyterian Cemetery in Cincinnati; NRHP-listed
- New St. Joseph Cemetery in Cincinnati
- Oak Hill Cemetery in Glendale
- Odd Fellows' Cemetery Mound in Newtown; NRHP-listed
- Old Jewish Cemetery in Cincinnati
- Old St. Joseph's Cemetery in Cincinnati
- Pioneer Memorial Cemetery in Cincinnati; NRHP-list
- Rest Haven Memorial Park, in Evendale
- Spring Grove Cemetery in Cincinnati; NRHP-listed
- St. John Cemetery in Cincinnati
- United American Cemetery in Cincinnati
- United Jewish Cemetery in Cincinnati
- Vine Street Hill Cemetery in Cincinnati; NRHP-listed
- Walnut Hills Cemetery in Cincinnati
- Wesleyan Cemetery in Cincinnati

== Hardin County ==
- Burial sites at Ridgeway Site in Hale Township

== Highland County ==
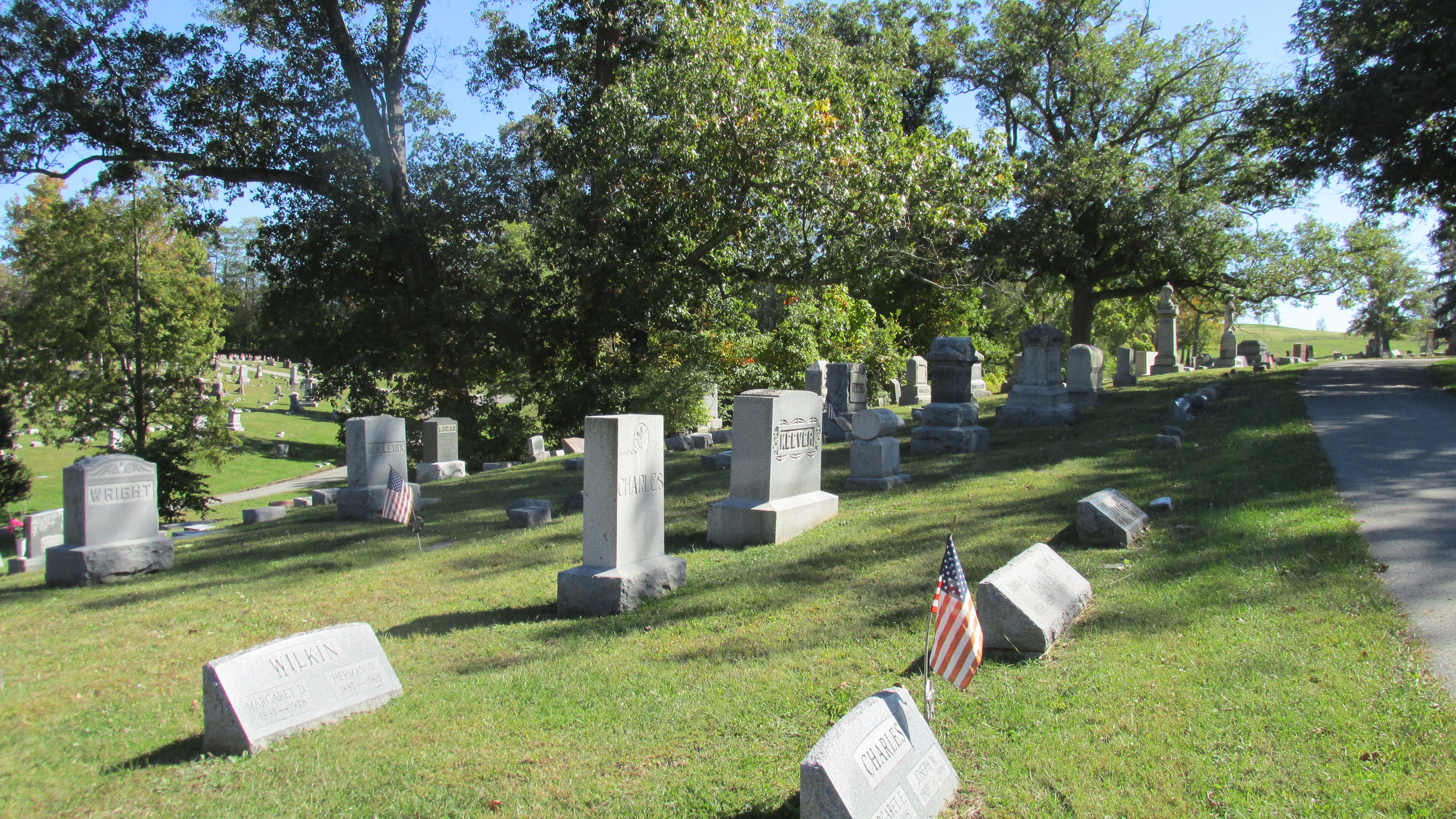
Hillsboro Cemetery in Hillsboro, Highland County

- Hillsboro Cemetery in Hillsboro

== Huron County ==
- St. Peter Catholic Church in Norwalk

== Jefferson County ==
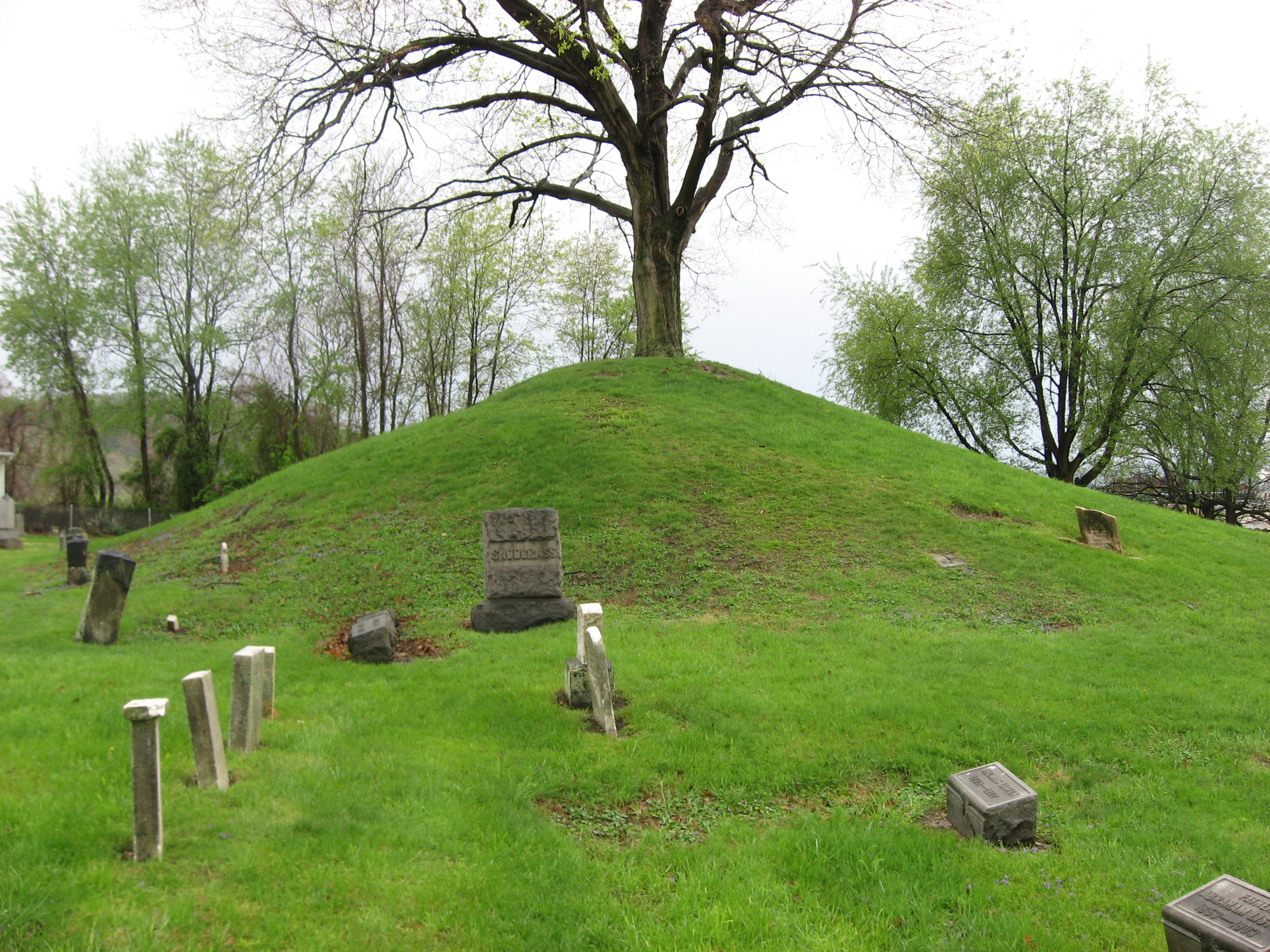
Hodgen's Cemetery Mound in Tiltonsville, Jefferson County

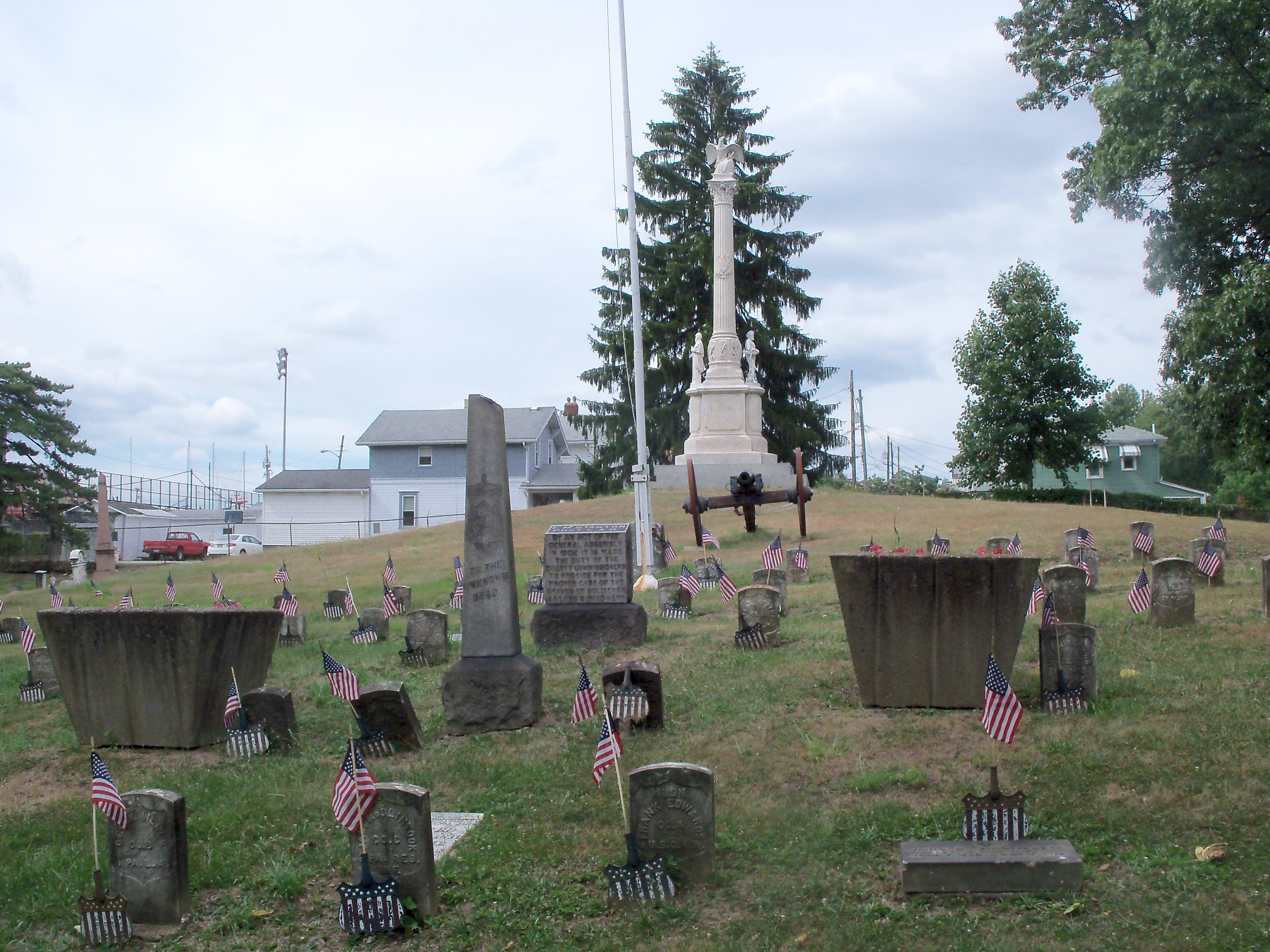
American Civil War memorial at Union Cemetery-Beatty Park (2012) in Steubenville

- Hodgen's Cemetery Mound in Tiltonsville; NRHP-listed
- Union Cemetery-Beatty Park in Steubenville; NRHP-listed

== Lorain County ==
- Burial sites at Franks Site in Vermilion; NRHP-listed
- Ridge Hill Memorial Park in Amherst

== Lucas County ==
- Woodlawn Cemetery in Toledo; NRHP-listed

== Mahoning County ==
- Calvary Cemetery in Youngstown
- Oak Hill Cemetery in Youngstown

== Marion County ==
- Marion Cemetery Receiving Vault in Marion

== Medina County ==
- Ohio Western Reserve National Cemetery in Seville
- Spring Grove Cemetery in Medina
- Old Town Cemetery in Medina

== Miami County ==
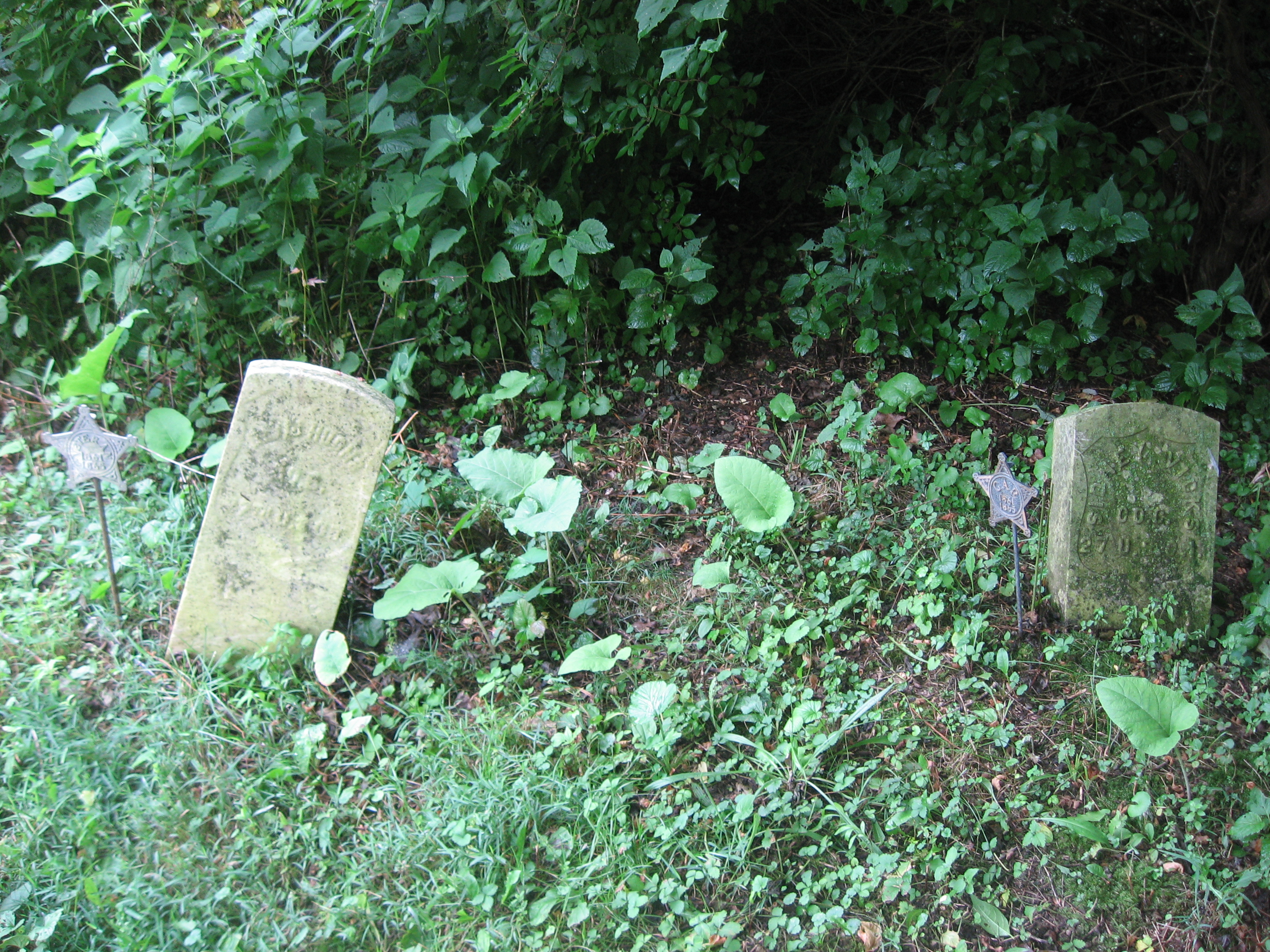
Broken gravestones in the African Jackson Cemetery near Piqua, Miami County

- African Jackson Cemetery near Piqua; NRHP-listed

== Montgomery County ==
- Dayton National Cemetery in Dayton
- Woodland Cemetery and Arboretum in Dayton; NRHP-listed

== Preble County ==
- Cemetery at Hopewell Associate Reformed Presbyterian Church in Morning Sun; NRHP-listed

== Sandusky County ==
- McPherson Cemetery in Clyde
- Oakwood Cemetery in Fremont

== Seneca County ==
- Cemetery at Pleasant Ridge United Methodist Church in Tiffin; NRHP-listed

== Stark County ==
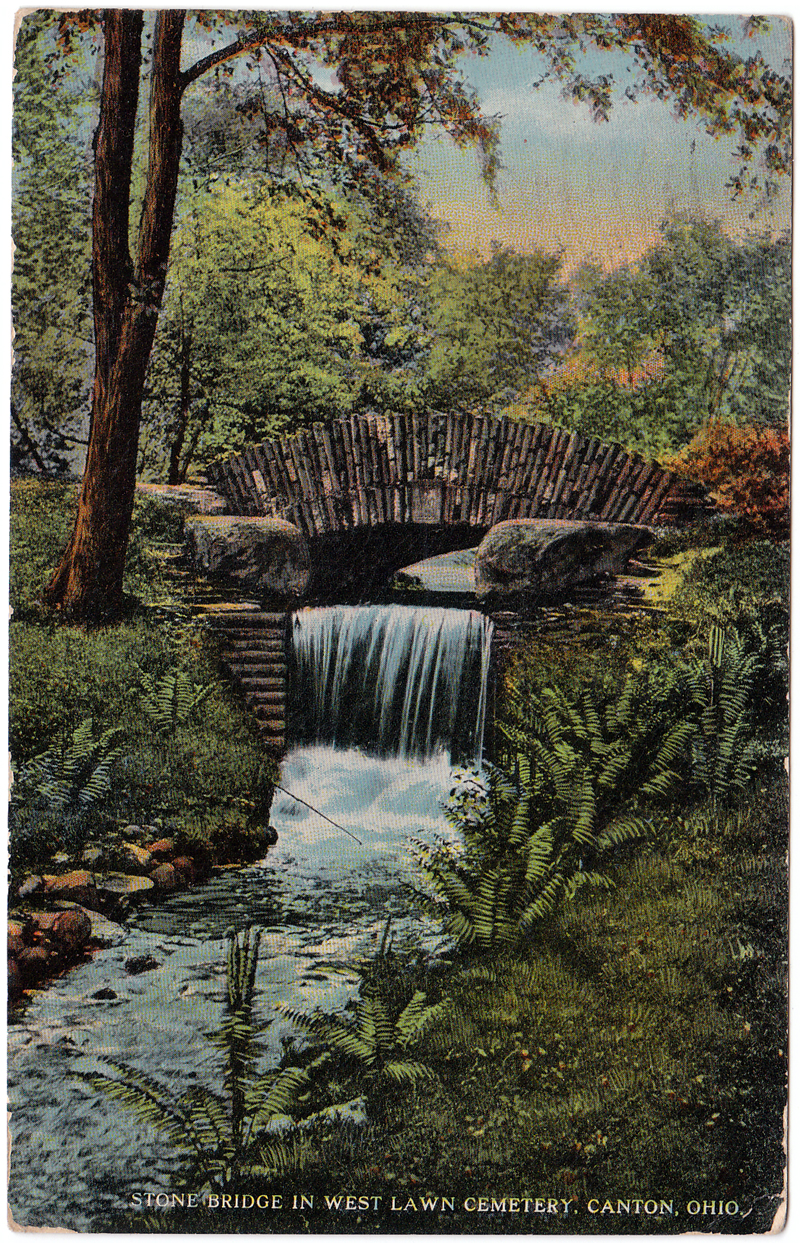
Stone Bridge (1916) in West Lawn Cemetery in Canton, Stark County

- West Lawn Cemetery in Canton

== Summit County ==
- Glendale Cemetery in Akron

== Warren County ==
- Bone Stone Graves in Oregonia; NRHP-listed
- Woodhill Cemetery in Franklin

== Washington County ==
- Mound Cemetery in Marietta; NRHP-listed

== See also ==
- Pioneer cemetery
- List of cemeteries in the United States
- List of burial mounds in the United States
