= Walnut Hills Cemetery =

Walnut Hills Cemetery may refer to:

- Walnut Hills Cemetery (Cincinnati)
- Walnut Hills Cemetery (Brookline, Massachusetts)
- Walnut Hills Cemetery (Petersburg, Indiana)
- Walnut Hill Cemetery (Council Bluffs, Iowa)
