= Irish McIlveen =

Irish baseball player (1880–1960)

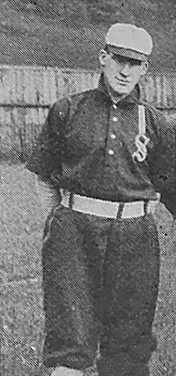
- Outfielder
- Born: July 27, 1880; Belfast, Ireland
- Died: October 18, 1960 (aged 80); Lorain, Ohio, U.S.
- Batted: Left Threw: Left

MLB debut
- July 10, 1906, for the Pittsburgh Pirates

Last MLB appearance
- May 6, 1909, for the New York Highlanders

MLB statistics
- Batting average: .215
- Home runs: 0
- RBI: 8
- Stats at Baseball Reference

Teams
- Pittsburgh Pirates (1906); New York Highlanders (1908–1909)

Henry Cooke "Irish" McIlveen (July 27, 1880 – October 18, 1960), commonly nicknamed "Irish" because he was born in Belfast, was a Major League Baseball outfielder. He played for the Pittsburgh Pirates in 1906 and the New York Highlanders in 1908–1909.

== Early life ==
McIlveen was born in Belfast, Ireland on July 27, 1880, and was the son of John J McIlveen and his wife Jemima Lavery. His father was from Dromara in County Down, his mother was from Belfast and they had eleven children. The family emigrated from Ulster to America in the late 1880s and settled in the Pittsburgh area in Pennsylvania. McIlveen attended Penn State University.

== Baseball career ==
On July 10, 1906, McIlveen made his big league debut. He would end up hitting for a .215 batting average in 53 games over a three-year career. McIlveen did not play in the Majors in 1907. In 1906, McIlveen pitched in two games for an ERA of 7.71. In the field, he made four errors for a .951 career fielding percentage. McIlveen played his final game on May 9, 1909.

He was 5 feet, 11.5 inches tall and 180 pounds in weight. He also threw and batted left-handed.

== Death ==
McIlveen died on October 18, 1960, in Lorain, Ohio, aged 80. His body is buried at Ridge Hill Memorial Park in Lorain.
