= Mount Tabor Methodist Episcopal Church (West Liberty, Ohio) =

Historic church in Champaign County, Ohio, US

- Mt. Tabor Church Building, Cemetery and Hitching Lot
- U.S. National Register of Historic Places
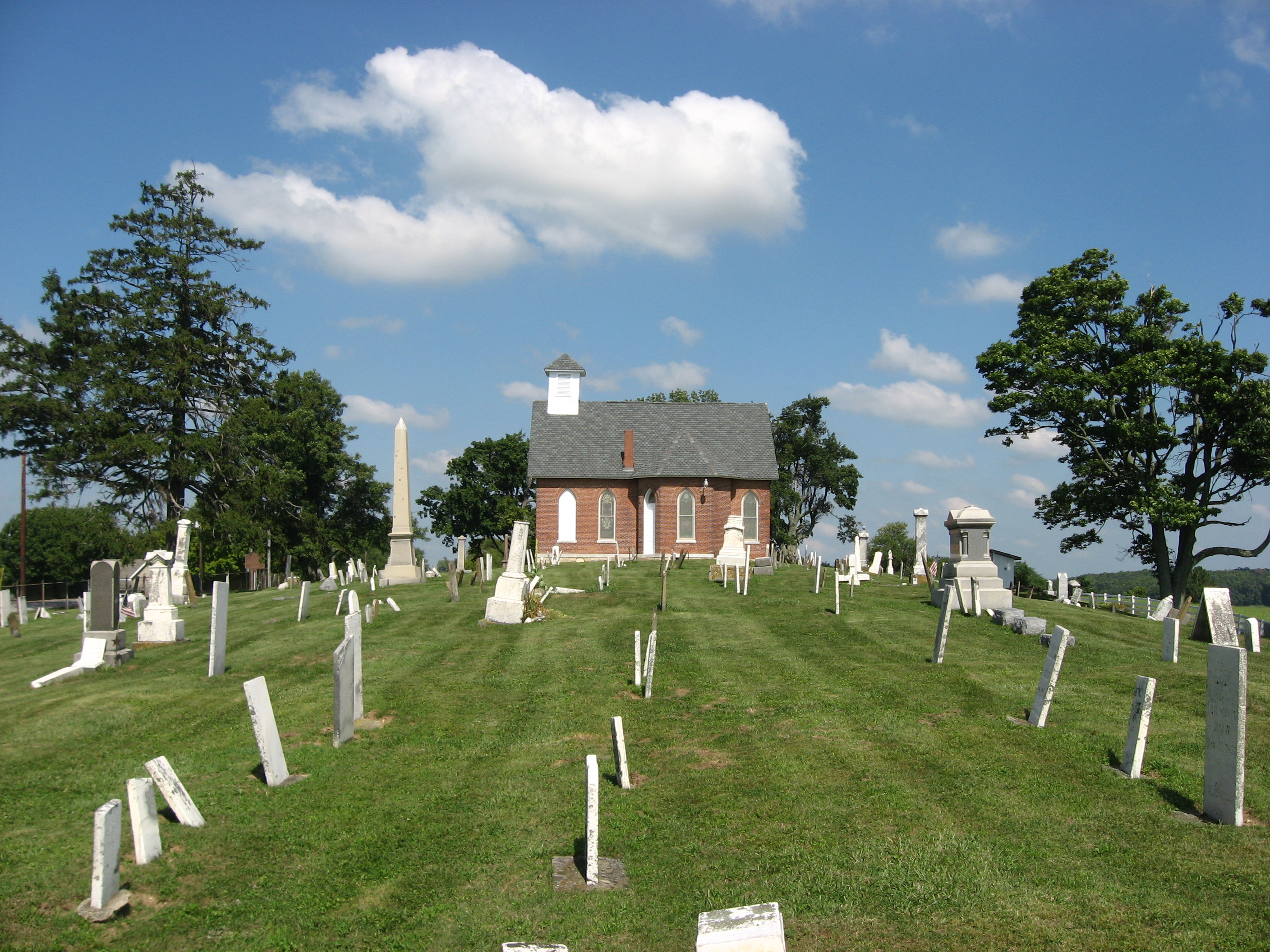
- Southern side of the church, seen from the cemetery

- Location within Ohio Location within the United States
- Location: State Route 245, 300 metres (980 ft) south of its junction with Mt. Tabor Rd., Salem Township, Champaign County, Ohio
- Nearest city: West Liberty
- Coordinates: 40°13′44″N 83°41′38″W
- Area: 4.8 acres (1.9 ha)
- Built: 1881
- Architectural style: Gothic Revival
- NRHP reference No.: 95001329
- Added to NRHP: November 22, 1995

The Mount Tabor Methodist Episcopal Church is a historic church building located along State Route 245 near West Liberty in Salem Township, Champaign County, Ohio, United States. Built in 1881 in the Gothic Revival style of architecture, it served a congregation formed in the 1810s. This congregation of the Methodist Episcopal Church worshipped in at least three different buildings before its closure.

== Organic history ==
Methodism was established in Salem Township in 1814, and the congregation's first church building, a log structure, was constructed in 1816. Beginning in that year and continuing for several more years, significant camp meetings were held at the church. Among those who attended these meetings was Simon Kenton, who seems to have been present for a meeting in 1820. In attendance for an 1818 meeting was John W. Ogden, then a six-year-old boy; reminiscing sixty years later, he wrote:

A large company was collected on and around the preacher's stand; nearly all were standing on their feet, some on benches, some on chairs and some on the ground. It seemed that all were engaged, either in preaching, singing, praying, shouting, crying, or laughing; had never beheld such a scene. The jerks were then a common exercise at the Methodist meetings; the young women were mostly affected in this way. Stout young women would be taken with the jerks, and it would seem they would be jerked to pieces; their long hair would come down on their shoulders and become disheveled, and, in their jerking, would crack like a wagon whip; and sometimes they would fall, backward, or in any way, over the rough benches or logs and lay for hours in a state of apparent suspension of life, and, after awhile [sic?], get up all well.

— John W. Ogden. The History of Champaign County, Ohio. Chicago: Beers, 1881, 509.

== Architectural history ==
Among the leading members of Mount Tabor church in its earliest years was the family of Nathaniel and Ann Hunter; natives of Greenbrier County, Virginia, they relocated to Salem Township in 1814. When the first church building was erected in 1816, Nathaniel and his four sons contributed greatly to the construction effort, and they were equally generous in the later construction of two successive brick structures at the site. Built in 1881, the final structure was a Gothic Revival church built primarily of brick on a stone foundation, topped with a slate roof, and ornamented with wooden elements. Like many other committed members of the church, this family — parents, all four sons, and all five daughters — is buried at the adjacent cemetery.

== Cemetery ==
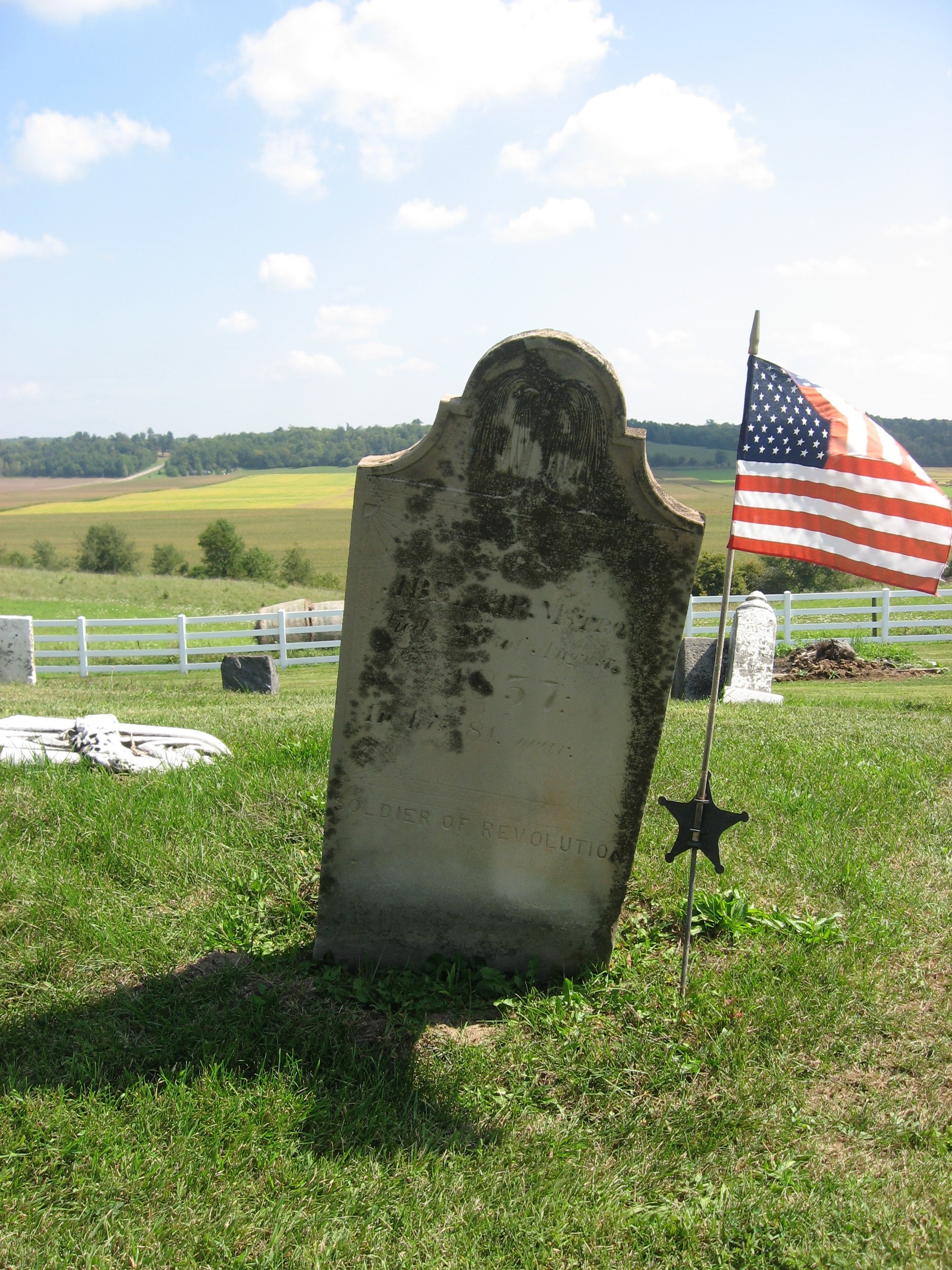
A Revolutionary War veteran's grave at Mount Tabor

From the Mount Tabor society's earliest years, members buried their dead near the site of the present church. The earliest recorded burial on the site of the church's cemetery is that of a child who died in 1811; at that time, there were no plans to use the ground for religious purposes. Individuals from many generations since have been buried in the cemetery: among the graves are those of veterans of the American Revolutionary War through World War II. Among the grave markers are three fashioned from cast zinc; these are highly distinctive, for zinc markers were only manufactured for a few years near the end of the nineteenth century.

== Recognition ==
In 1995, the Mount Tabor Methodist Episcopal Church, its cemetery, and an associated hitching lot were listed together on the National Register of Historic Places, due primarily to their architectural significance. This designation is unusual, for both religious properties and cemeteries must pass higher standards than most other properties to be eligible for inclusion on the National Register.

== See also ==
- List of cemeteries in Ohio
