= George Rohe =

American baseball player (1874–1957)

- Infielder
- Born: September 15, 1874; Cincinnati, Ohio, U.S.
- Died: June 10, 1957 (aged 82); Cincinnati, Ohio, U.S.
- Batted: Right Threw: Right

MLB debut
- May 7, 1901, for the Baltimore Orioles

Last MLB appearance
- October 6, 1907, for the Chicago White Sox

MLB statistics
- Batting average: .227
- Home runs: 3
- Runs batted in: 92
- Stats at Baseball Reference

Teams
- Baltimore Orioles (1901); Chicago White Sox (1905–1907)

George Anthony "Whitey" Rohe (September 15, 1874 – June 10, 1957) was an American infielder in Major League Baseball from 1901 to 1907. He played for the Baltimore Orioles and Chicago White Sox. Rohe was the surprise hitting star of the 1906 World Series for the Chicago White Sox, batting .333 (7-21) with a double, 2 triples, and 4 RBIs. His bases loaded triple scored 3 runs in the White Sox 3-0 victory in Game 3 of the series. His timely hitting throughout the series helped the White Sox defeat the powerful Cubs in 6 games. By 1908 he was out of major league baseball. He is buried in Cincinnati's Walnut Hills Cemetery.
