= Catherine Street Burying Ground =

Cemetery in Cincinnati, Ohio

Coordinates: 39.1054°N 84.5256°W

Catherine Street Burying Ground was the second Catholic cemetery in Cincinnati, Ohio, United States. It was located near Court Street and Cutter Street.

== History ==
Land for the cemetery was purchased in 1828 by the local Catholic bishop. The cemetery operated until 1856 when the Catholic Diocese announced that it was abandoning the Catherine Street Cemetery because it could not get a clear title to the land. Catholics were advised to move remains to another cemetery. This same year, Cincinnati City Council passed an ordinance prohibiting any new cemeteries within the existing city limits. Many cemeteries were in deplorable condition or had been totally abandoned. Later some of these cemeteries were made into parks, the best known of these is Washington Park on Elm Street in front of Music Hall.

The cemetery is # 15142 (Catherine Street Catholic Cemetery) in “Ohio Cemeteries 1803-2003”, compiled by the Ohio Genealogical Society.
