= Pleasant Ridge United Methodist Church =

Historic church in Ohio, United States

- Pleasant Ridge United Methodist Church and Cemetery
- U.S. National Register of Historic Places
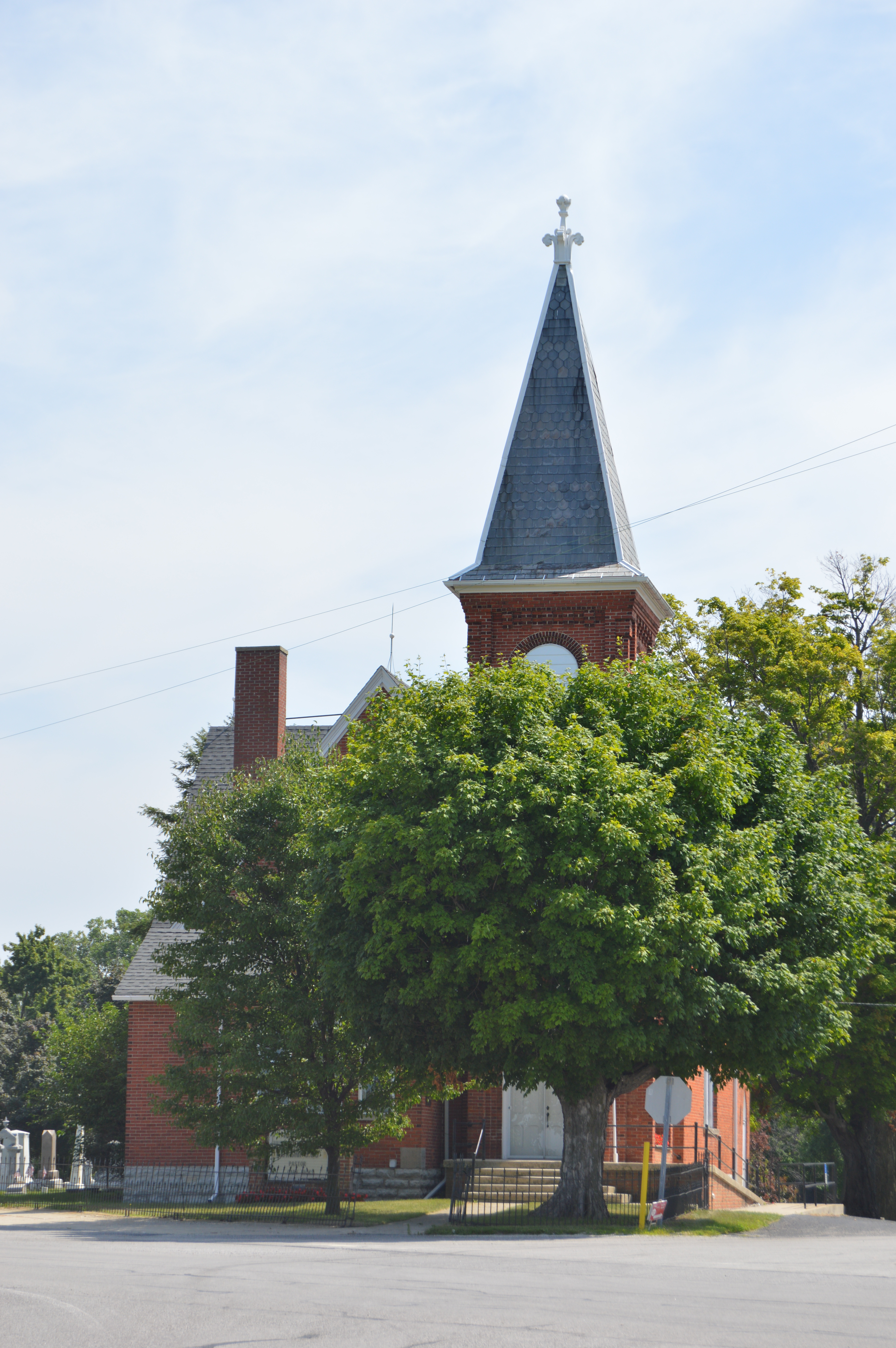
- Front from the west

- Location within Ohio Location within the United States
- Nearest city: Tiffin, Ohio
- Coordinates: 41°10′5″N 83°5′58″W
- Area: 2 acres (0.81 ha)
- Built: 1890
- Architect: Pittman, Henry
- Architectural style: Gothic Revival
- NRHP reference No.: 93000880
- Added to NRHP: September 10, 1993

Pleasant Ridge United Methodist Church (Egbert Methodist Episcopal Church) is a historic church in Pleasant Township, Seneca County, Ohio.

It was built in 1890 and added to the National Register in 1993, along with its cemetery.
