= Ridge Hill Memorial Park =

Cemetery in Ohio, United States

Coordinates: 41°25′04″N 82°11′05″W

Details
- Established: 1929
- Location: Lorain County, Ohio
- Country: United States
- Type: Public
- Size: 100 acres (40 ha)
- Website: ridgehillmp.org
- Find a Grave: Ridge Hill Memorial Park

Ridge Hill Memorial Park is a 100-acre (0.40 km^{2}) cemetery (60 of which are developed) located in Lorain County, Ohio. Started in 1929. It is non-sectarian and welcoming to all faiths and cultures. In 2023 Ridge Hill Memorial Park became the first and only cemetery in Lorain County, Ohio to offer glass front cremation niches and a cremation scattering garden.

Ridge Hill Memorial Park is governed by a board of directors, who are elected by and from the cemetery lot owners. Trust funds are utilized to ensure that the cemetery remains financially solvent in perpetuity.

Ridge Hill Memorial Park is considered the best maintained cemetery in the region, and offers superior value to all other local cemeteries.

== Notable interments ==
- Henry Cooke 'Irish' McIlveen, baseball player
- William Knox Schroeder, Kent State University shooting victim
