= Old Franklinton Cemetery =

Cemetery in Columbus, Ohio

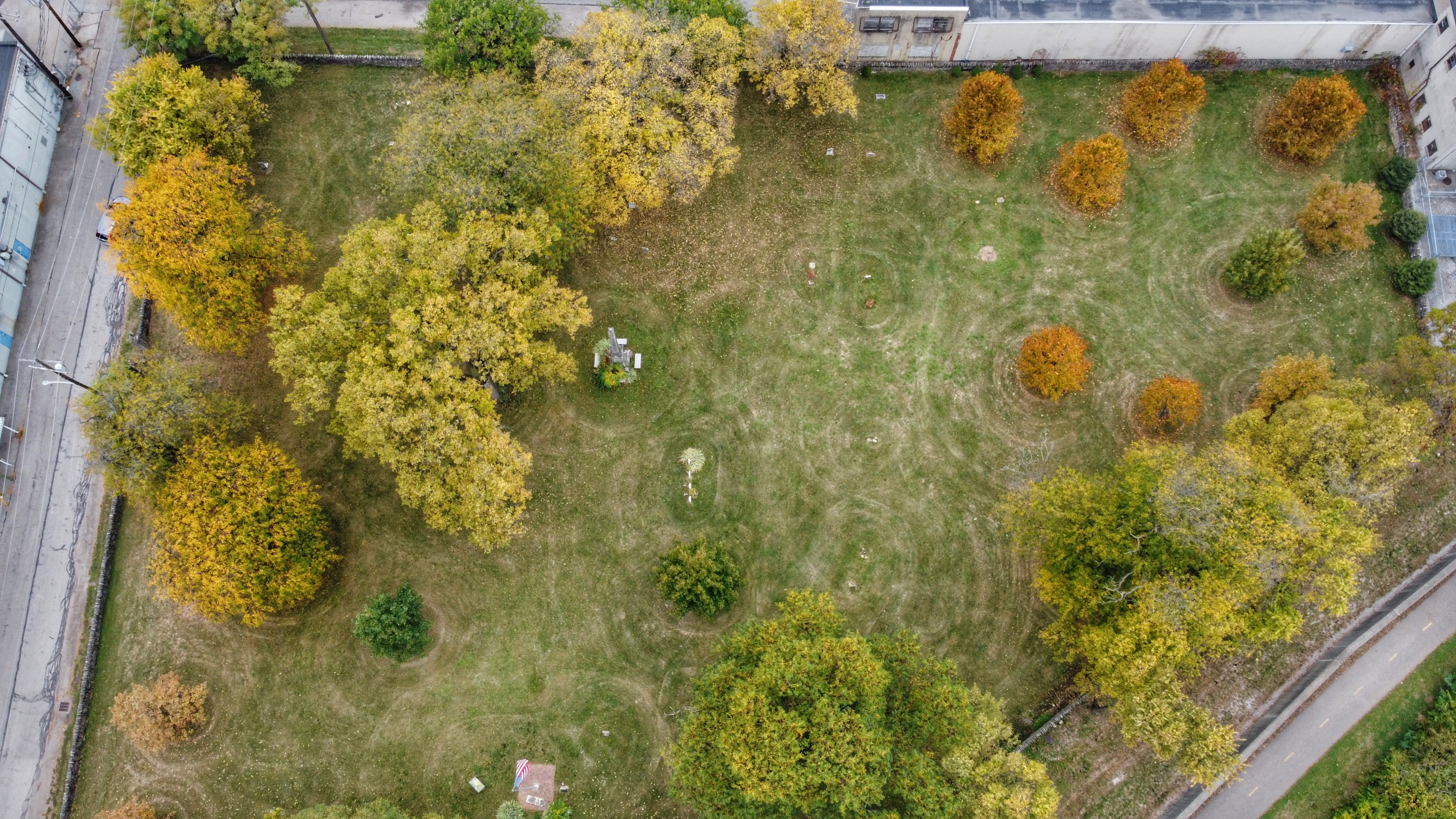
- Aerial view of the cemetery

Details
- Established: 1799
- Location: River St., Columbus, Ohio
- Coordinates: 39°57′46″N 83°01′20″W
- Find a Grave: Old Franklinton Cemetery

The Old Franklinton Cemetery is a cemetery in the Franklinton neighborhood of Columbus, Ohio. The cemetery is the oldest in Central Ohio, established in 1799. Other names for it include the Franklinton Cemetery or Pioneer Burying Ground. Franklinton founder Lucas Sullivant was buried there initially, later reinterred in Green Lawn Cemetery.

Franklinton's first church was constructed beside the cemetery in 1811, a year before Columbus was established.

== Gallery ==
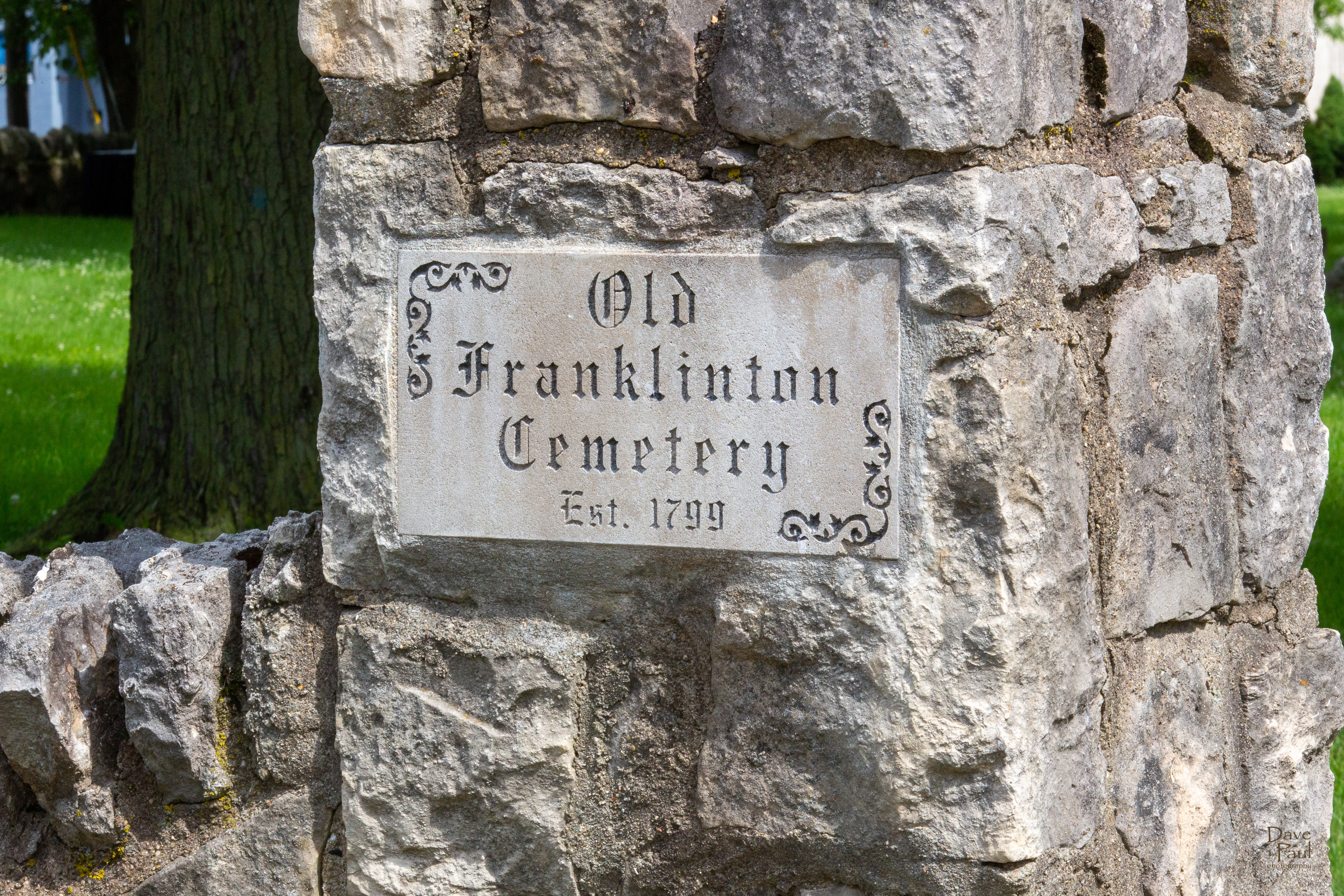
Entrance gate inscription

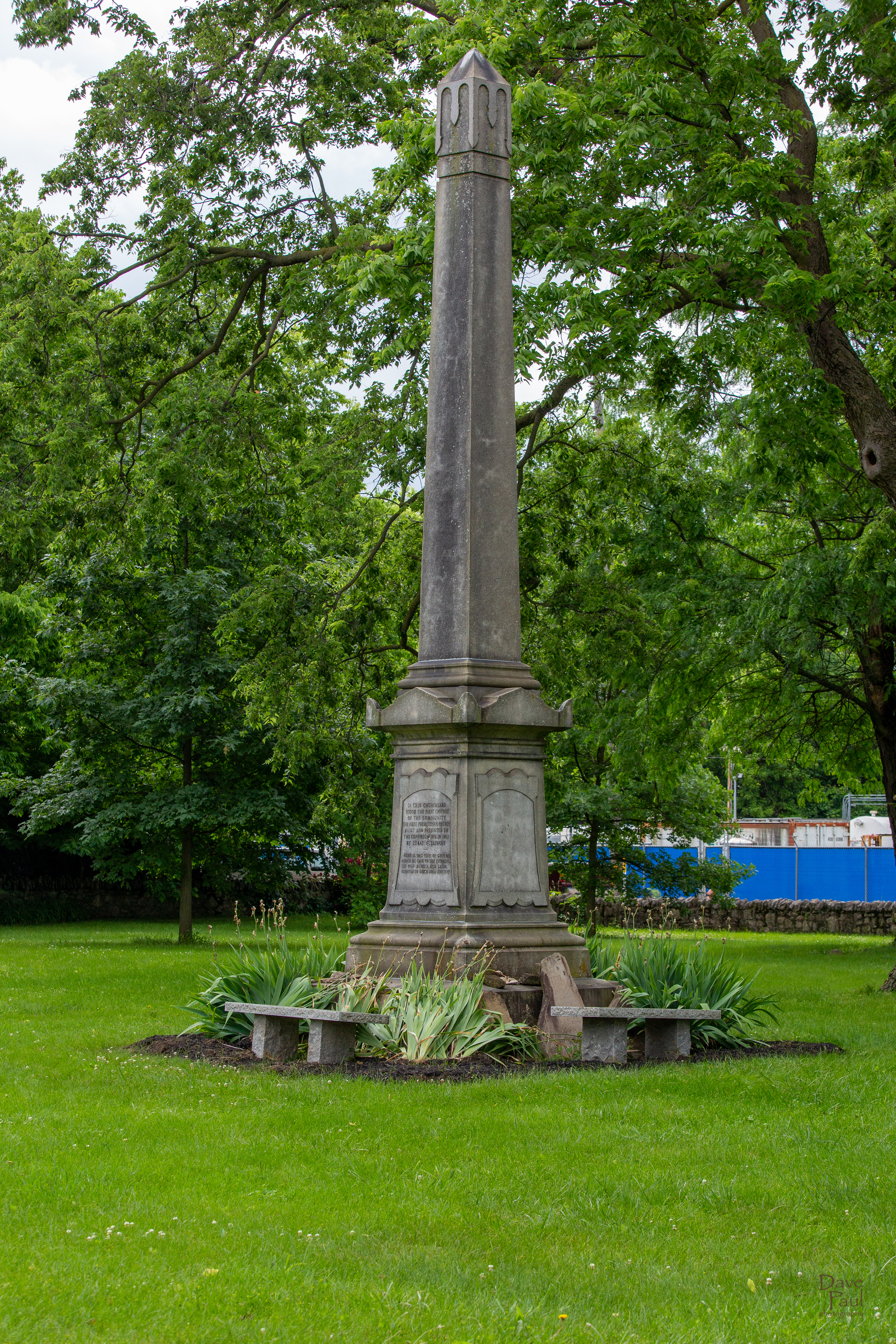
Obelisk memorial

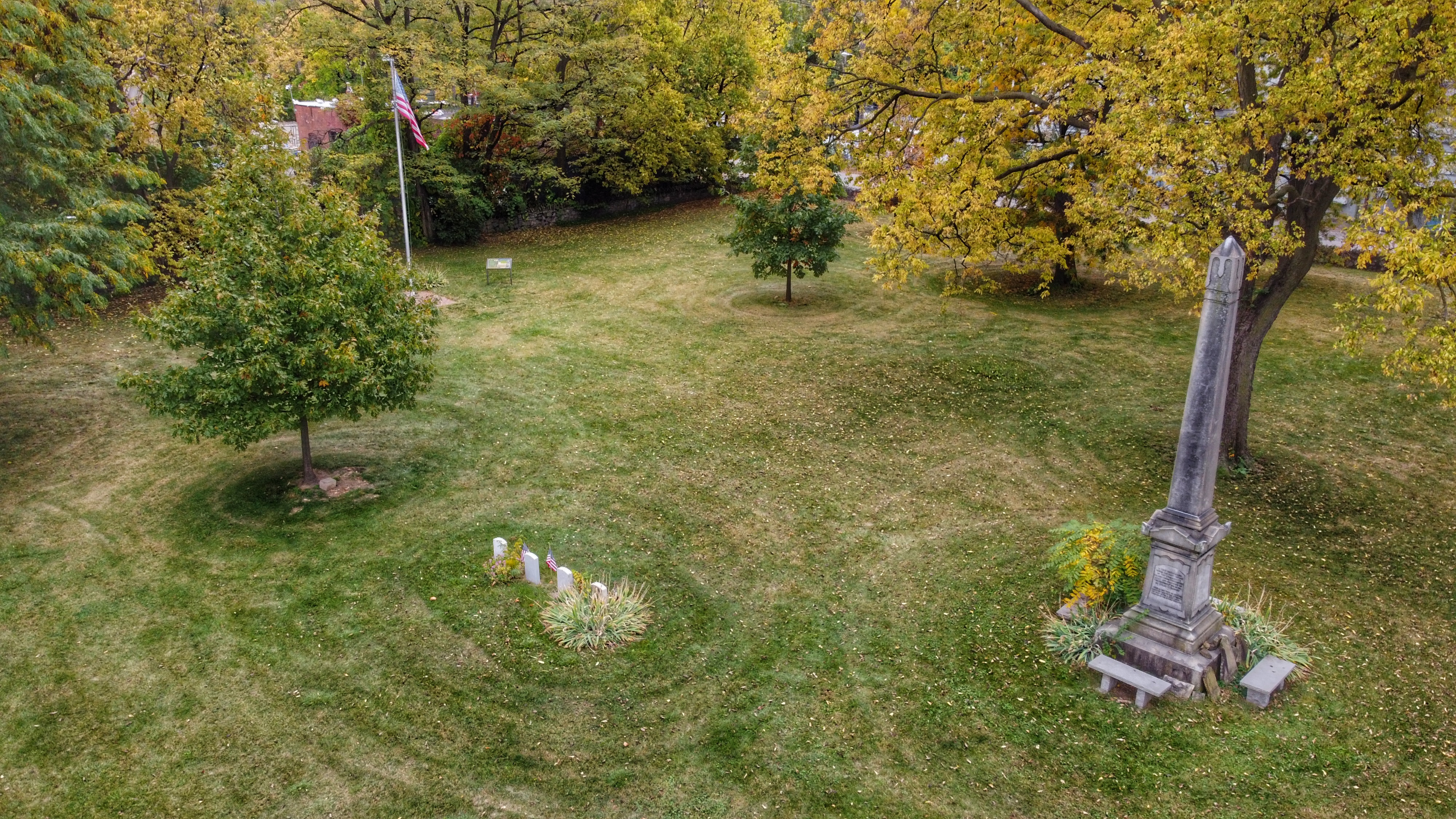
Aerial view
