= St. Peter Catholic Church (Norwalk, Ohio) =

Former 19th century church

Coordinates: 41°14′22″N 82°37′12″W

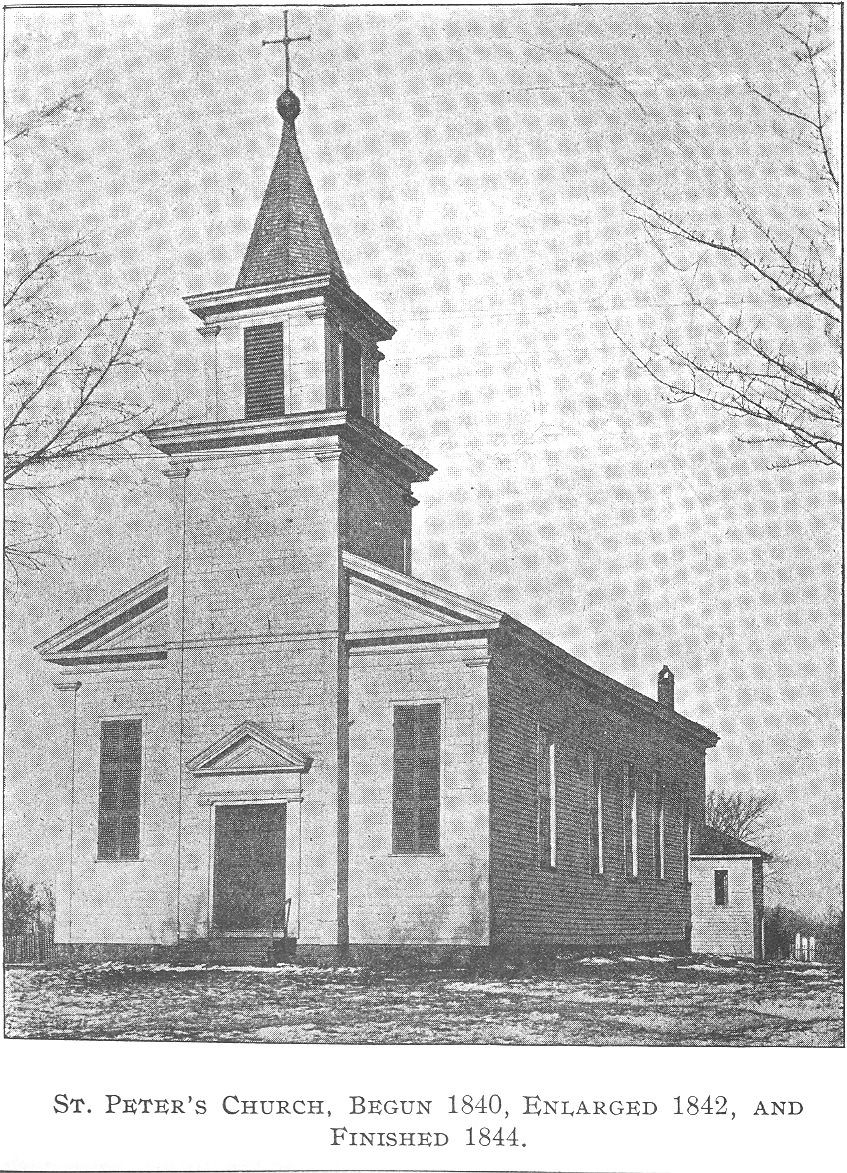

Religion
- Affiliation: Roman Catholic
- Ecclesiastical or organisational status: Parish church
- Status: Demolished

Location
- Location: Norwalk, Ohio, United States
- Interactive map of St. Peter Catholic Church

Architecture
- Groundbreaking: 1840
- Completed: 1844

Specifications
- Length: 90 ft (27 m)
- Width: 40 ft (12 m)
- Materials: Timber

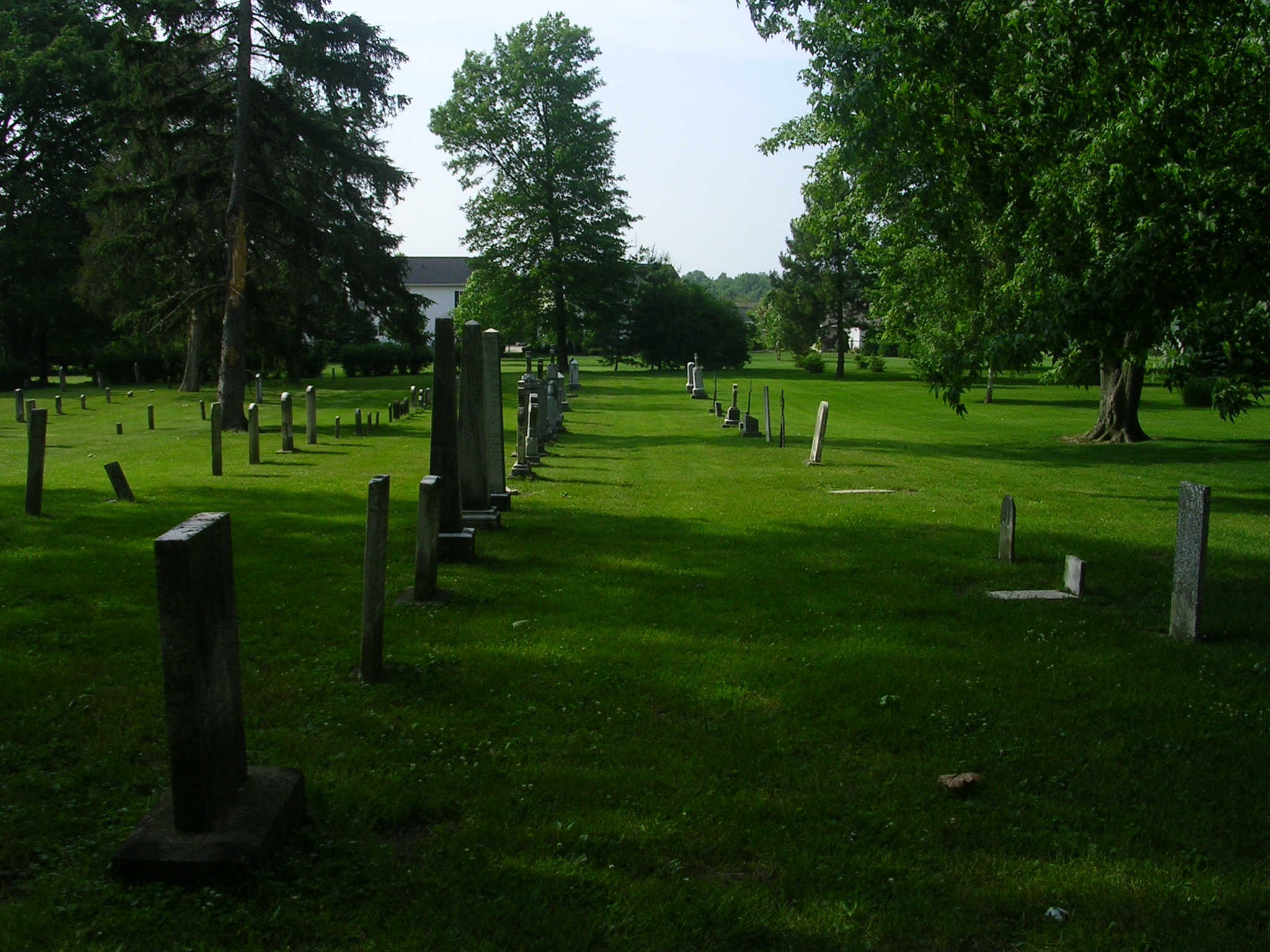
St. Peter's Cemetery, which is all that is left of St. Peter's Church today.

St. Peter Catholic Church was a Roman Catholic parish church in the Roman Catholic Diocese of Cleveland. The church was located on West Main Street in Norwalk, Ohio, in the United States. The church is no longer in existence today. The only remaining part of St. Peter's is its 14-rod (70 m) by 8-rod (40 m) (0.7-acre [2,800 m^{2}]) cemetery. In its place today stands the Shrine of the Sorrowful Mother, built with funds from the Fisher family of the Fisher Body coachbuilder fame.

== Catholics in Norwalk ==
St. Peter's was the first Roman Catholic church built in Norwalk. Prior to its construction, the people of Norwalk attended mass at St. Alphonsus, established about 1828, in neighboring Peru. Construction of the church building began in 1840. The church was enlarged in 1842, and finally completed in 1844.

There were mainly two different ethnic groups of Catholics in Norwalk prior to the building of St. Mary Mother of the Redeemer Catholic Church and St. Paul Roman Catholic church: the Irish Catholics and the German Catholics. Shortly before the first railroad was built through Norwalk, which was in the early 1850s, there was a large influx of Irish people into Norwalk. They came to work on the railroad. Most of the newcomers settled in the northwest section of town, and attended Mass at St. Peter's. Separate services were held in English and German for the two nationalities attending the church. The English-speaking Catholics wished to have a parish of their own, and so on October 12, 1853 a tract of land was bought on Milan Avenue at what is now the corner of St. Mary's Street and Milan Avenue.

As a result, the German Catholics remained at St. Peter's until the congregation grew to such an extent that they could no longer use the church. In the late 1890s they built a new church under the patronage of St. Paul the Apostle. Some Germans remained at St. Peter's. In 1868, these church members built a new St. Peter's on Hester Street, known as the Hester Street Church. This church no longer exists.
