= Walnut Hills Cemetery (Cincinnati) =

Cemetery in Hamilton County, Ohio

Coordinates: 39°08′04″N 84°28′55″W

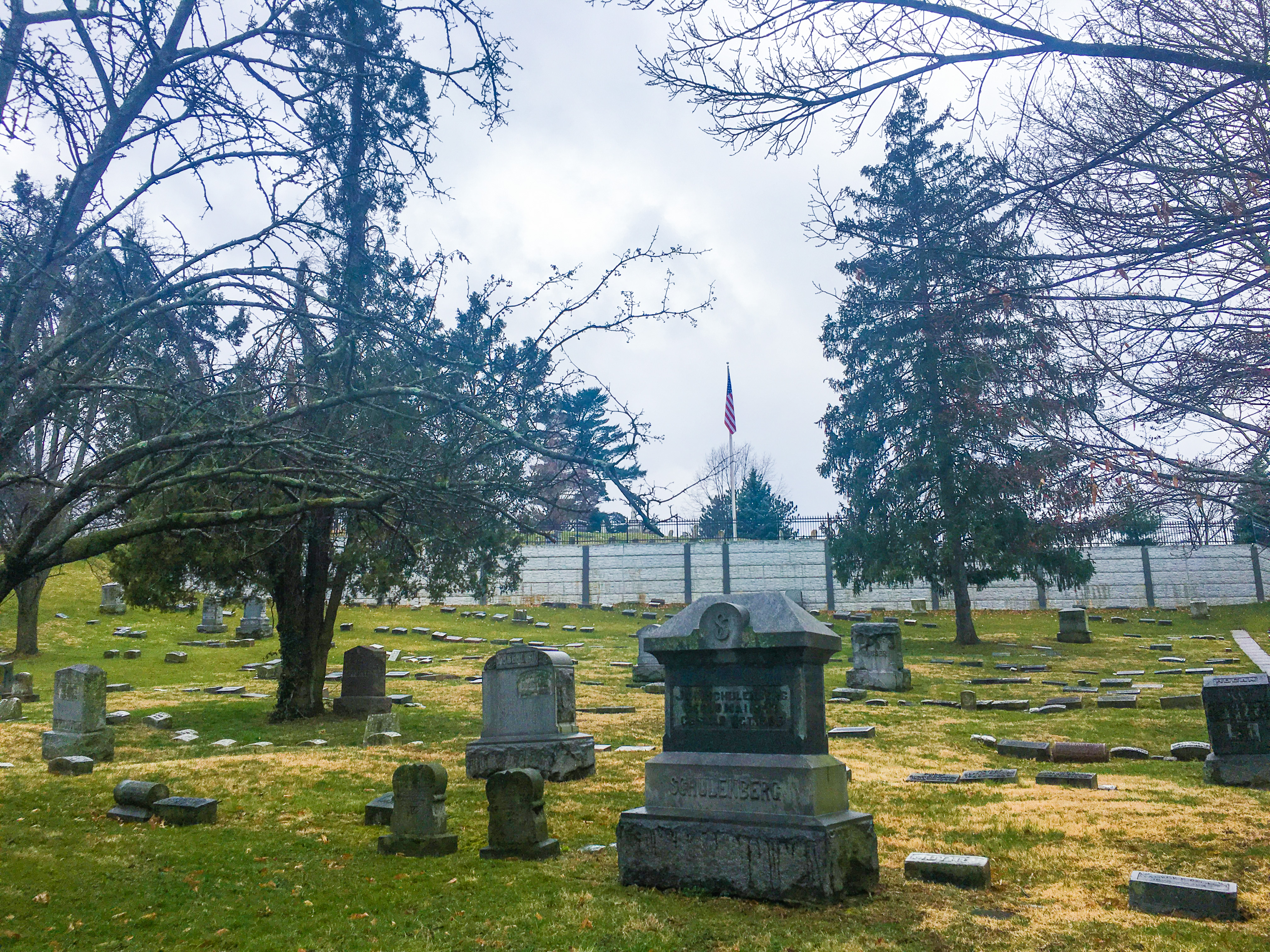
Walnut Hills Cemetery, March 2019

Walnut Hills Cemetery is located at 3117 Victory Parkway in the Walnut Hills neighborhood of Cincinnati, Ohio. The cemetery opened in 1843, under the name of "The Second German Protestant Cemetery". Other names include "German Cemetery", "German Protestant Cemetery", and "Walnut Hills Protestant Cemetery". Its original size was about 5 acres (20,000 m^{2}). In 1941, at the beginning of World War II, the name was changed to Walnut Hills Cemetery. Today, the cemetery sits on over 70 acres (280,000 m^{2}). Major League Baseball player George Rohe (1874–1957) is buried there.

== Notable burials ==
- Tony Hunter, professional football player
